= Om Prakash Bhasin Award =

Indian award for excellence in science and technology

- Awarded for: Research in science in India
- Location: India
- Presented by: Om Prakash Bhasin Foundation
- First award: 1985
- Website: opbfawards.com

Om Prakash Bhasin Award for Science and Technology is an Indian award, instituted in 1985 to recognize excellence in the areas of science and technology. The award, given individually or collectively to a group, is annual in cycle and carries a plaque, a citation and a cash prize of ₹ 100,000. The winners are invited to deliver the Om Prakash Bhasin Memorial Lecture at a venue decided by the award committee.

== Profile ==
Om Prakash Bhasin Awards have been instituted by Shri Om Prakash Bhasin Foundation, a New Delhi-based charitable organization founded by Vinod Bhasin, along with her two sons, Shivy Bhasin and Hemant Kumar Bhasin, to honour the memory of her husband, Om Prakash Bhasin, a non resident Indian businessman. The corpus for the award of ₹ 5,100,000 was formed by Om Prakash Bhasin as a trust before his death. The awards, started in 1985, are given in five categories. The selection is through a notified procedure and is decided by a committee appointed for the purpose. The committee includes the Chairman of the foundation, two trustees representing the foundation, a member of the scientific community and a representative of the State Bank of India, the bankers to the foundation. The incumbent committee members are:

- Shivy Bhasin - Chairman
- Hemant Kumar Bhasin - Foundation trustee
- Vinod Prakash Sharma - Scientist trustee
- Samar Vikram Bhasin - Foundation trustee
- State Bank of India nominee

== Categories ==
- Agriculture and Allied Sciences
- Biotechnology
- Electronics and Information Technology
- Engineering including Energy and Aerospace
- Health and Medical Sciences

== Recipients ==
=== Agriculture and Allied Sciences ===
Source: Shri Om Prakash Bhasin Foundation

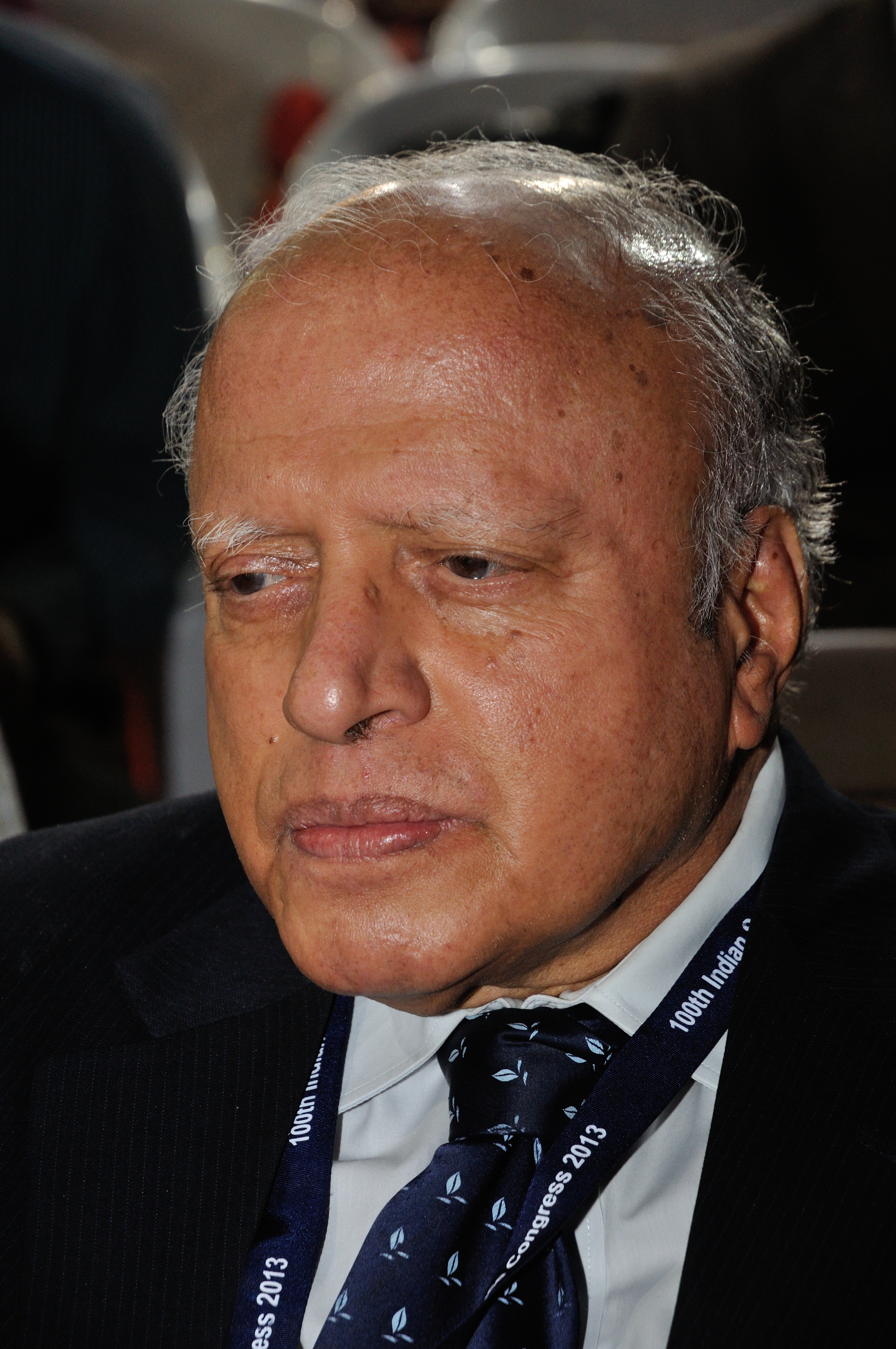
M. S. Swaminathan

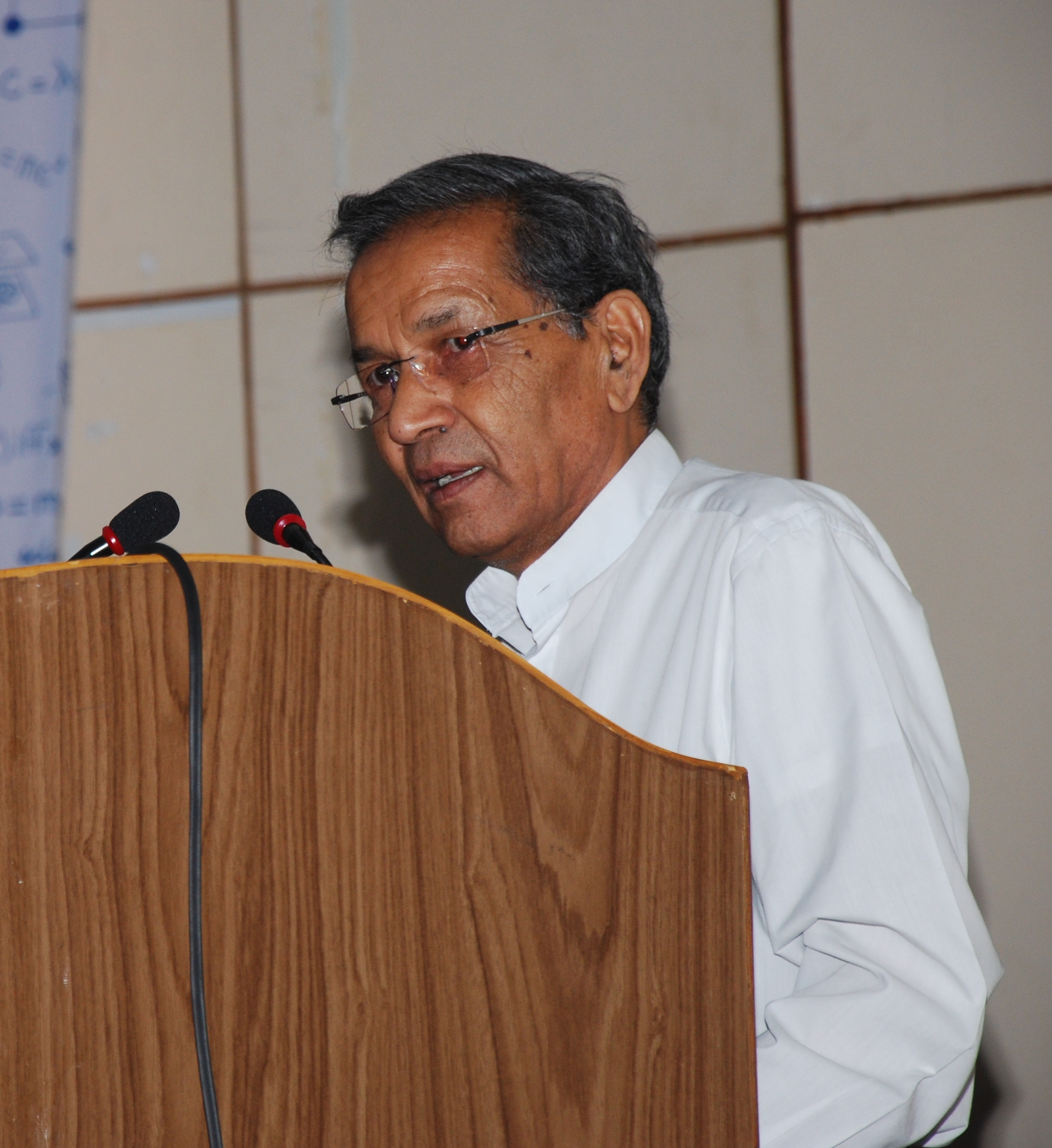
Aditya Narayan Purohit

Year	Recipient
1985	B. P. Pal
1986	H. K. Jain
1987	V. L. Chopra
1988	G. S. Venkataraman
1988	S. K. Sinha
1989	S. S. Parihar
1989	T. N. Khoshoo
1990	Prem Narain
1991	Rajendra Singh Paroda
1991	Y. L. Nene
1992	Anupam Verma
1992	Krishna Lal Chadha
1993	M. R. Sethuraj
1993	R. B. Sawhney
1994	S. N. Dwivedi
1994	E. A. Siddiq
1995	M. S. Swaminathan
1996	A. N. Purohit
1997	S. L. Mehta
1997	H. Sekhar Shetty
1998	A. Seetharam
1999	R. P. Sharma
2000	Sushil Kumar (biologist)
2001	S. Nagarajan
2002-2003	Motilal Madan
2006-2007	Baldev Singh Dhillon
2008-2009	Deepak Pental
2010-2011	Akhilesh Kumar Tyagi
2012	Vijay Pal Singh
2014	H.S. Gupta
2015	Subanna Ayyappan
2024	Dinesh A Nagegowda

=== Biotechnology ===
Source: Shri Om Prakash Bhasin Foundation

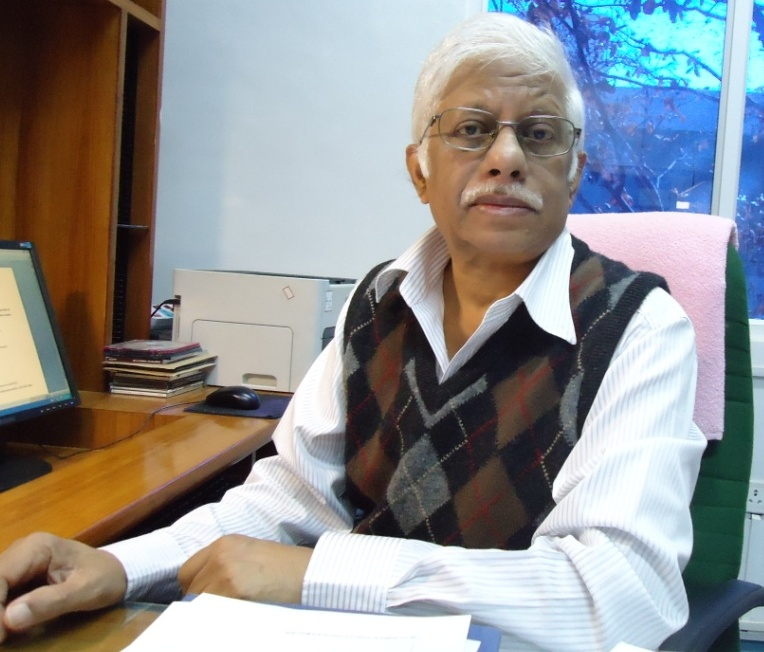
M. R. S. Rao.

Year	Recipient
1985	G. Padmanabhan
1986	K. K. G. Menon
1986	H. Y. Mohan Ram
1988	V. Jagannathan
1989	V. Sasisekharan
1989	Sipra Guha-Mukherji
1990	Indira Nath
1990	Jyotimoy Das
1991	S. Ramachandran
1992	A. K. Sharma
1993	Avadhesha Surolia
1993	Obaid Siddiqui
1994	C. R. Bhatia
1994	H. K. Das
1995	Asis Datta
1995	Brahm Shanker Srivastava
1996	P. K. Mehta
1996	Lalji Singh
1997	S. K. Basu
1997	D. Balasubramanian
1998	Manju Sharma
1999	C. M. Gupta
2000	M. Vijayan
2001	Partha P. Majumder
2002-03	Virander Singh Chauhan
2002-03	M. R. S. Rao
2004-05	Seyed E. Hasnain
2004-05	J. Gowrishankar
2008-09	Samir K. Brahmachari
2010-11	Kanury V. S. Rao
2012	Navin Khanna
2014	Chandrima Shaha
2015	M. K. Bhan
2020	Asad Ullah Khan

=== Electronics and Information Technology ===
Source: Shri Om Prakash Bhasin Foundation

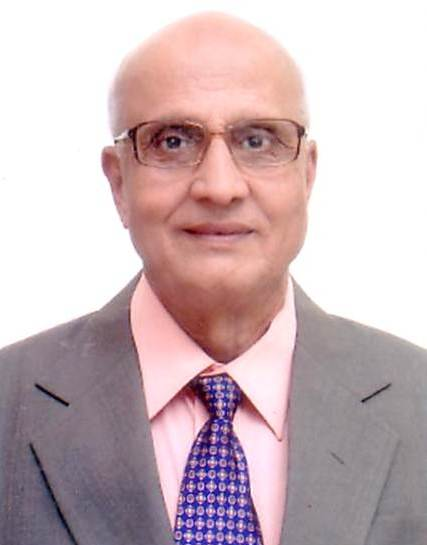
B. L. Deekshatulu.

Year	Recipient
1985	M. G. K. Menon
1986	P. V. S. Rao
1987	A. P. Mitra
1988	Narasimhan
1989	N. Seshagiri
1990	S. Ramani
1993	Sam Pitroda
1993	V. Rajaraman
1994	G. M. Cleetus
1994	Surendra Prasad
1995	B. L. Deekshatulu
1995	Neelakanthan
1996	Sudhansu Datta Majumdar
1997	Surendra Pal
1998	Shankar K. Pal
1999	K. G. Narayanan
2000	Vijay P. Bhatkar
2001	Lalit Mohan Patnaik
2002-03	Amitava Sen Gupta
2004-05	Ashok Jhunjhunwala
2006-07	V. Narayana Rao
2008-09	Shiban Kishen Koul
2011	Bidyut Baran Chaudhuri
2013	Bishnu P. Pal
2014	Subrat Kar
2015	Ajoy Kumar Ghatak
2016	Manav Bhatnagar
2017	Anirban Pathak
2020	Swades De
2022	Bhargab B. Bhattacharya

=== Engineering including Energy and Aerospace ===
Source: Shri Om Prakash Bhasin Foundation

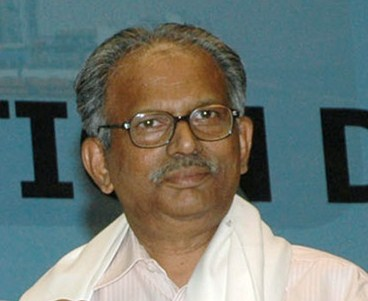
George Joseph.

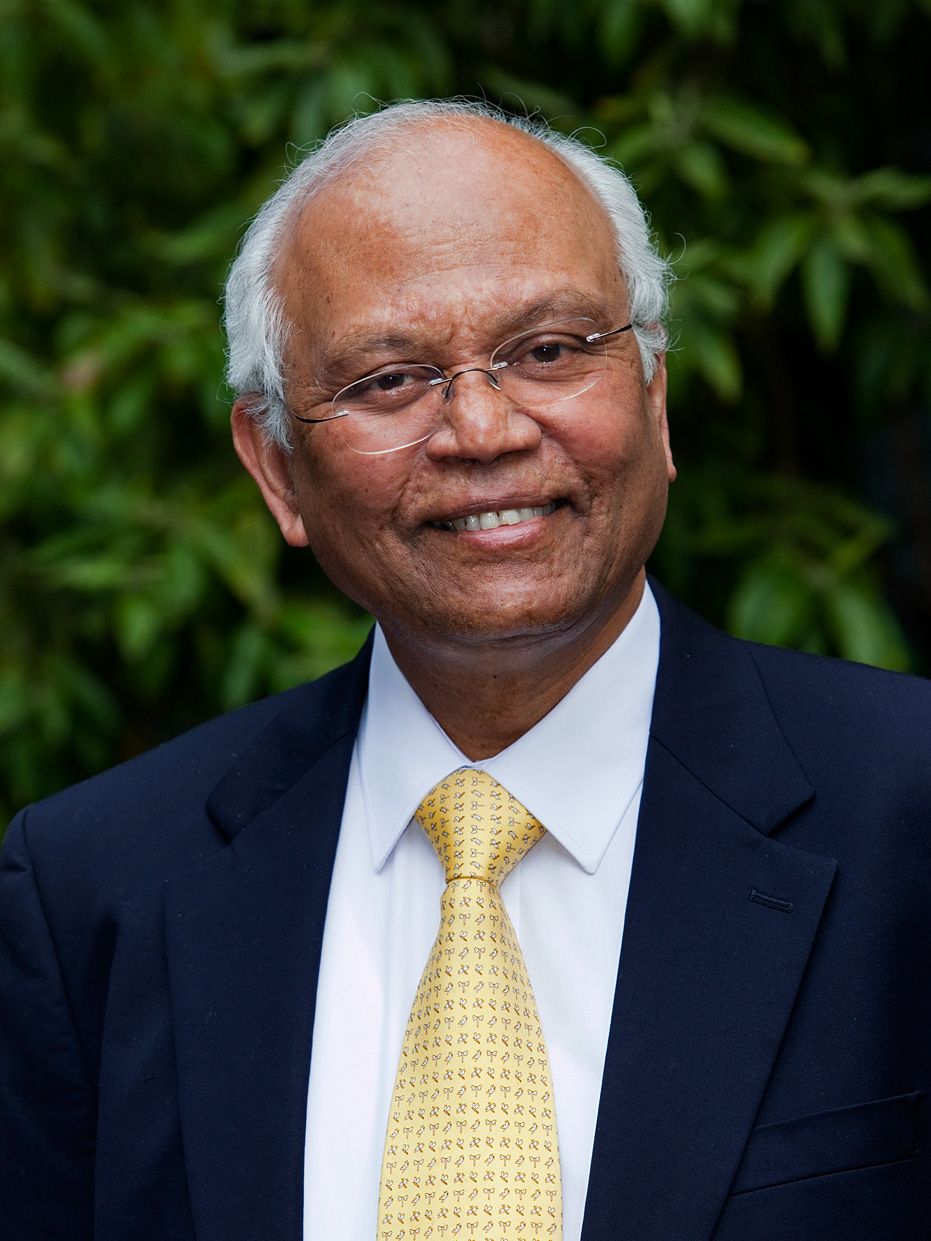
Raghunath Anant Mashelkar.

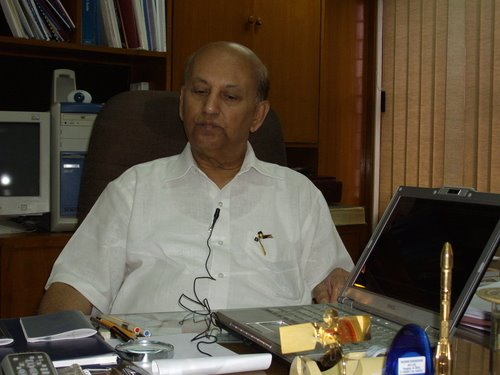
Udupi Ramachandra Rao.

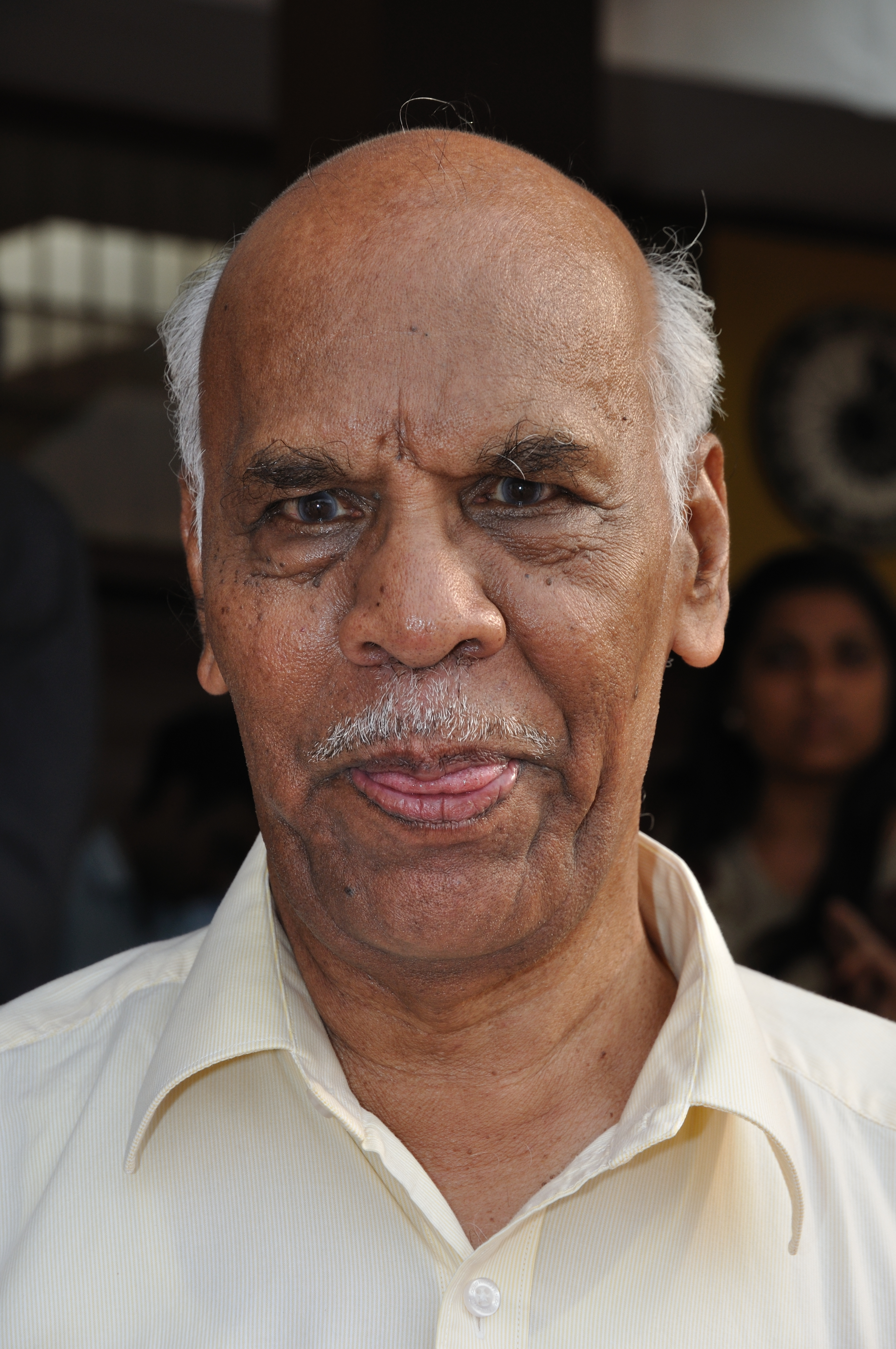
A. V. Rama Rao.

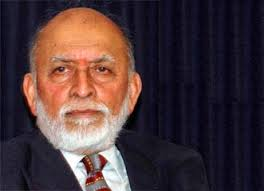
M. R. Srinivasan.

K. N. Shankara.

Patcha Ramachandra Rao.

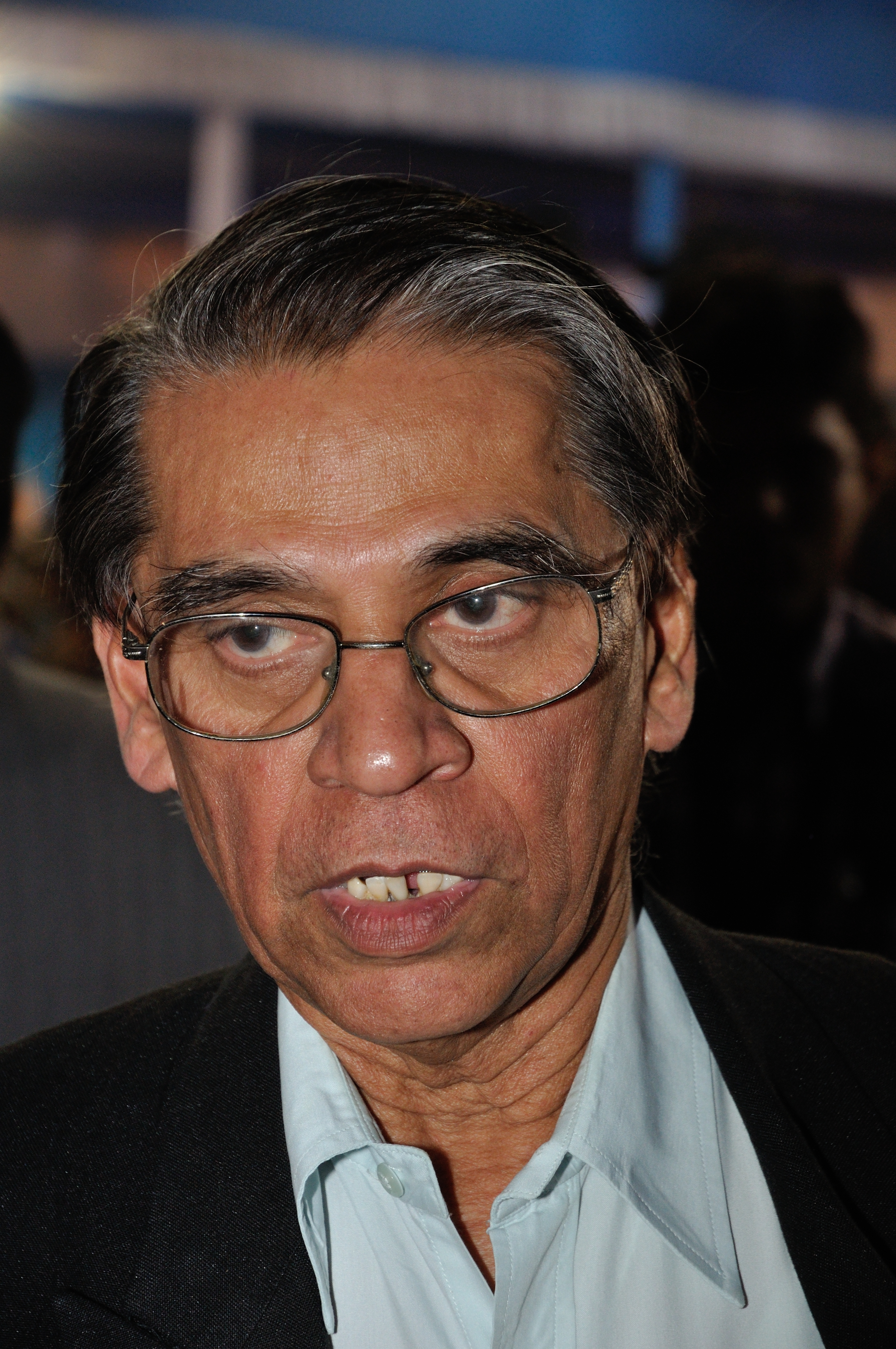
Thirumalachari Ramasami.

Prem Chand Pandey.

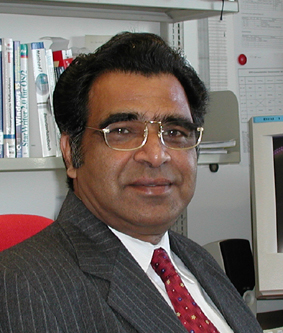
Narinder Kumar Gupta.

Year	Recipient
1985	Raja Ramanna
1985	M. M. Sharma
1985	Satish Dhawan
1985	S. Roy Choudhary
1986	Narla Tata Rao
1986	S. Varadarajan
1986	L. K. Doraiswamy
1986	A. P. J. Abdul Kalam
1987	Amulya Kumar N. Reddy
1987	S. C. Dutta Roy
1987	R. M. Vasagam
1987	George Joseph
1988	P. R. Roy
1988	R. K. Bhandari
1988	K. Kasturirangan
1989	V. S. Arunachalam
1989	K. L. Chopra
1989	J. C. Bhattacharya
1989	P. Banerji
1990	N. B. Prasad
1990	Keki Hormusji Gharda
1990	R. A. Mashelkar
1990	M. A. Ramaswamy
1991	Rajinder Kumar
1991	T. K. Bose
1992	M. S. Vasudeva
1992	Paul Ratnasamy
1992	P. Ramachandran
1992	R. Balakrishnan
1993	P. Rama Rao
1993	Udupi Ramachandra Rao
1994	H. S. Mukunda
1994	A. V. Rama Rao
1994	K. K. Mahajan
1995	Jyoti Parikh
1995	S. Sivaram
1995	G. Madhavan Nair
1995	Prem Shanker Goel
1996	M. R. Srinivasan
1996	T. S. R. Prasada Rao
1996	C. G. Krishnadas Nair
1997	K. S. Narasimhan
1997	K. N. Shankara
1998	Patcha Ramachandra Rao
1999	Placid Rodrigues
2000	Thirumalachari Ramasami
2001	Suhas Pandurang Sukhatme
2002-03	E. Sreedharan
2004-05	Prem Chand Pandey
2006-07	Kota Harinarayana
2008-09	Narinder Kumar Gupta
2011	Baldev Raj
2013	G. Sundararajan
2014	Bhim Singh
2015	Sneh Anand
2019	Devang Vipin Khakhar

=== Health and Medical Sciences ===
Source: Shri Om Prakash Bhasin Foundation

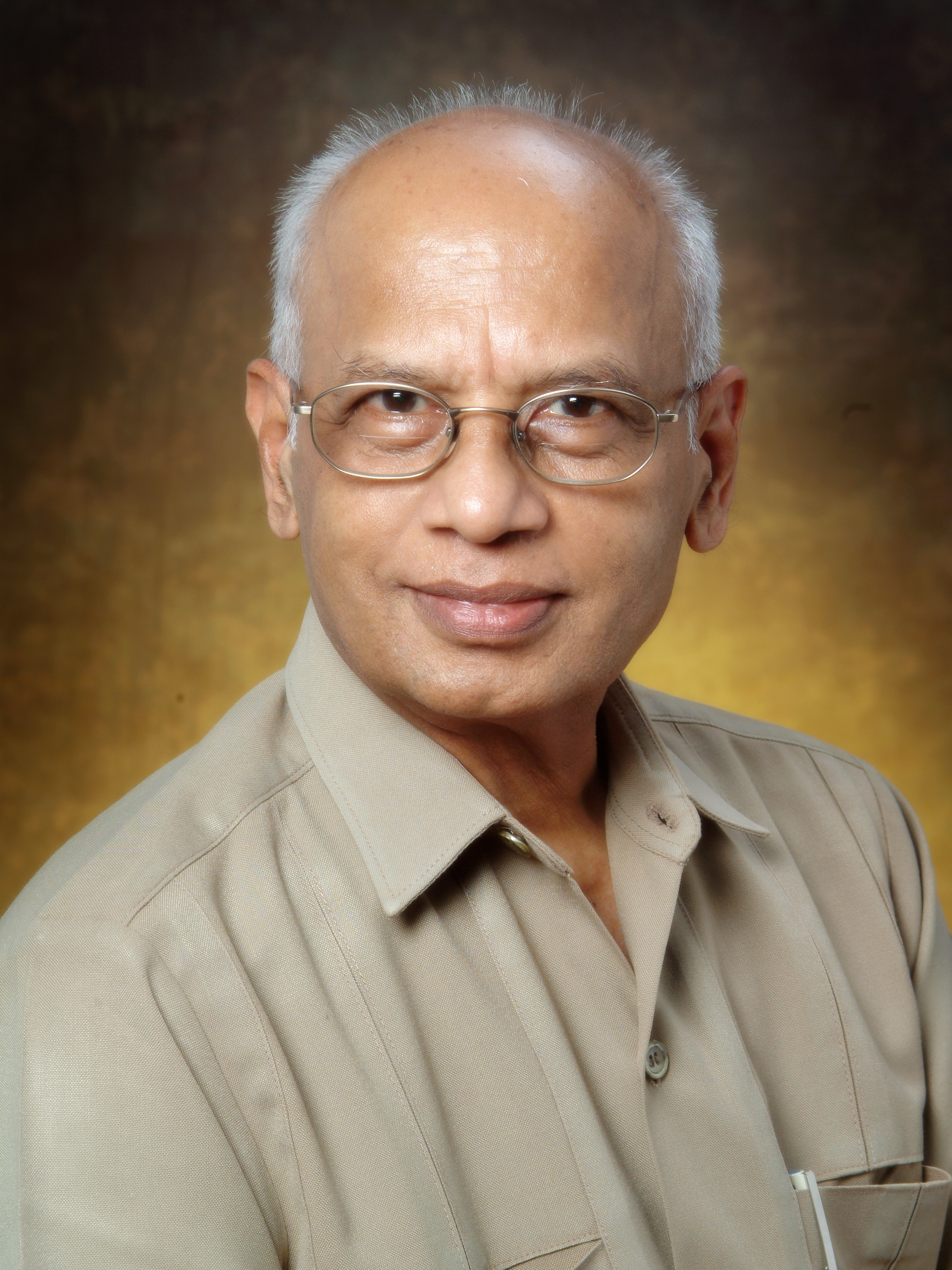
M. S. Valiathan.

Year	Recipient
1985	Vinod Prakash Sharma
1985	P. K. Rajagopalan
1986	M. S. Valiathan
1987	Prakash Narain Tandon
1988	M. G. Deo
1989	A. N. Malaviya
1990	B. N. Dhawan
1990	J. S. Guleria
1991	Madan Mohan
1991	U. C. Chaturvedi
1992	Fali S. Mehta
1992	S. K. Kacker
1994	Asha Mathur
1995	V. Ramalingaswami
1995	V. I. Mathan
1997	Kalyan Banerji
1997	Ved Prakash Kamboj
1995	N. K. Ganguly
1997	Sneh Bhargava
1998	Gourie Devi
1999	Geeta Talukder
2000	Narinder Kumar Mehra
2001	Vijayalakshmi Ravindranath
2002-2003	A. S. Paintal
2004-2005	Pradeep Seth
2006-2007	Shiv Kumar Sarin
2008-2009	Jitendra Nath Pande
2011	Viswa Mohan Katoch
2013	Girish Sahni
2014	Balram Bhargava
2015	Nikhil Tandon
2018	Rohit Srivastava

== See also ==
- List of general science and technology awards
- List of biology awards
- List of engineering awards
- List of medicine awards
- List of physics awards
