= Vinod Prakash Sharma =

Indian scientist

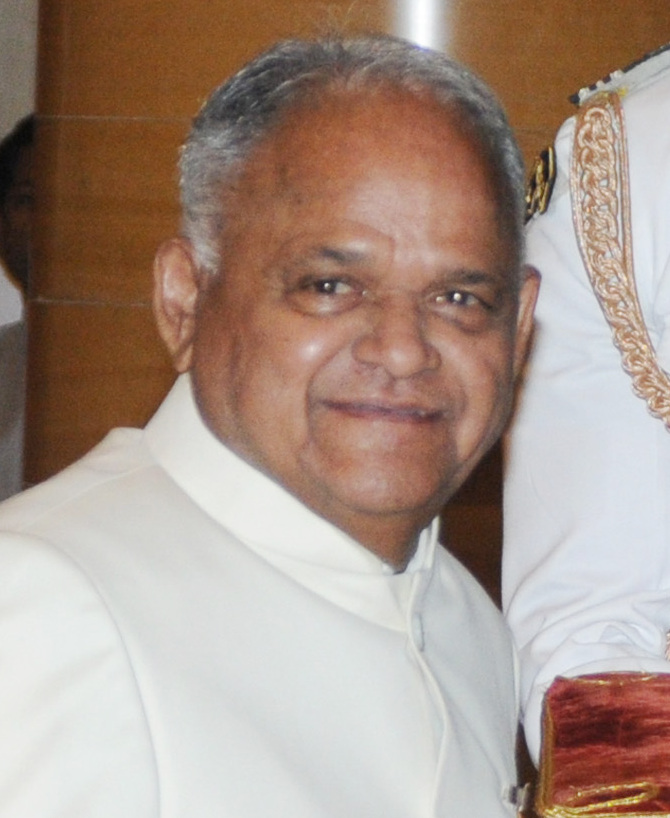
- Born: 6 April 1938; Prayagraj (formerly Allahabad), United Provinces, British India
- Died: 9 October 2015 (aged 77); New Delhi, India
- Occupation: Scientist
- Awards: Padma Bhushan; Meghnad Saha Distinguished Fellow; Gujar Mal Modi award Padma Shri; WHO Darling Foundation Prize; GI Inventions Award; Chancellor's Prize; MOT Aiyengar Award; B. R. Ambedkar Centenary Award; Om Prakash Bhasin Award; Ranbaxy Award; M. L. Gupta Trust Award; VASVIK Industrial Research Award; Green Scientist Award; G. P. Chatterjee Memorial Award; Dr. R. V. Rajaram Oration Award; Dr. U. S. Srivastava Memorial Lecture Award; Professor L. S. Ramaswami Memorial Oration Award; Life Time Achievement Award; B. N. Singh Oration Award; B. K. Srivastava Oration Award

Vinod Prakash Sharma (6 April 1938 – 9 October 2015) was an Indian malariologist and entomologist, known for his work in vector biology and bioenvironmental control of malaria. Recipient of many awards, including the Padma Shri, he was again honoured by the Government of India, in 2014, by bestowing on him the third highest civilian award, the Padma Bhushan.

== Biography ==
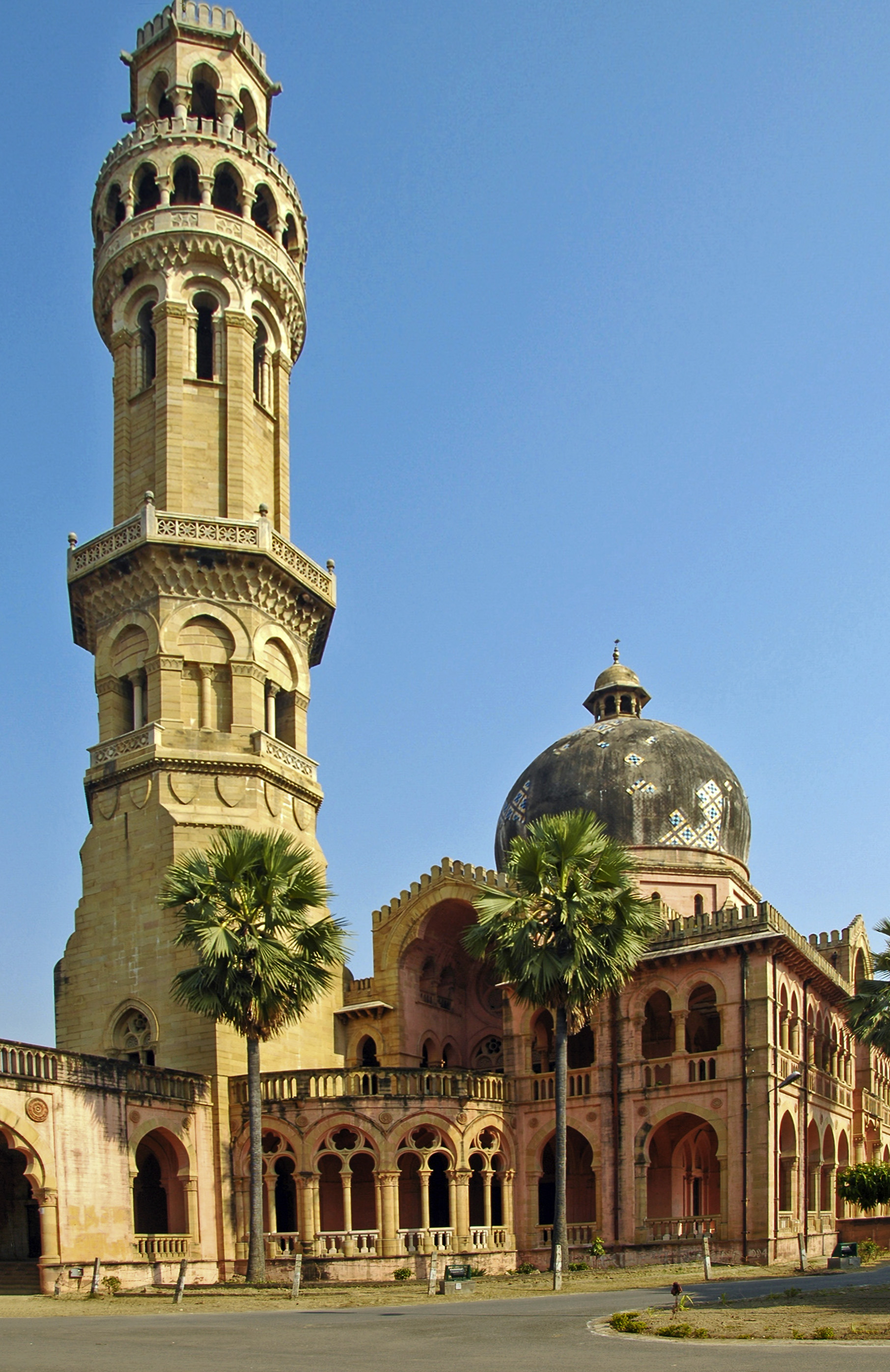
Muir Central College, Allahabad University

Vinod Prakash Sharma was born on 6 April 1938 in Prayagraj, in Uttar Pradesh, India. After early education locally, he joined Allahabad University from where he secured MSc in 1960 and DPhil in 1964. In 1965, he left to South Bend, Indiana, USA and joined the University of Notre Dame as a post doctoral research associate, but later, shifted to Purdue University, USA. Sharma returned to India in 1968 and joined Allahabad University, again, to complete his DSc which he promptly did in 1979.

Sharma, lived in Vasant Kunj, New Delhi and took care of his duties as the Distinguished Professor at the Centre for Rural Development and Technology, Indian Institute of Technology Delhi.

== Career ==
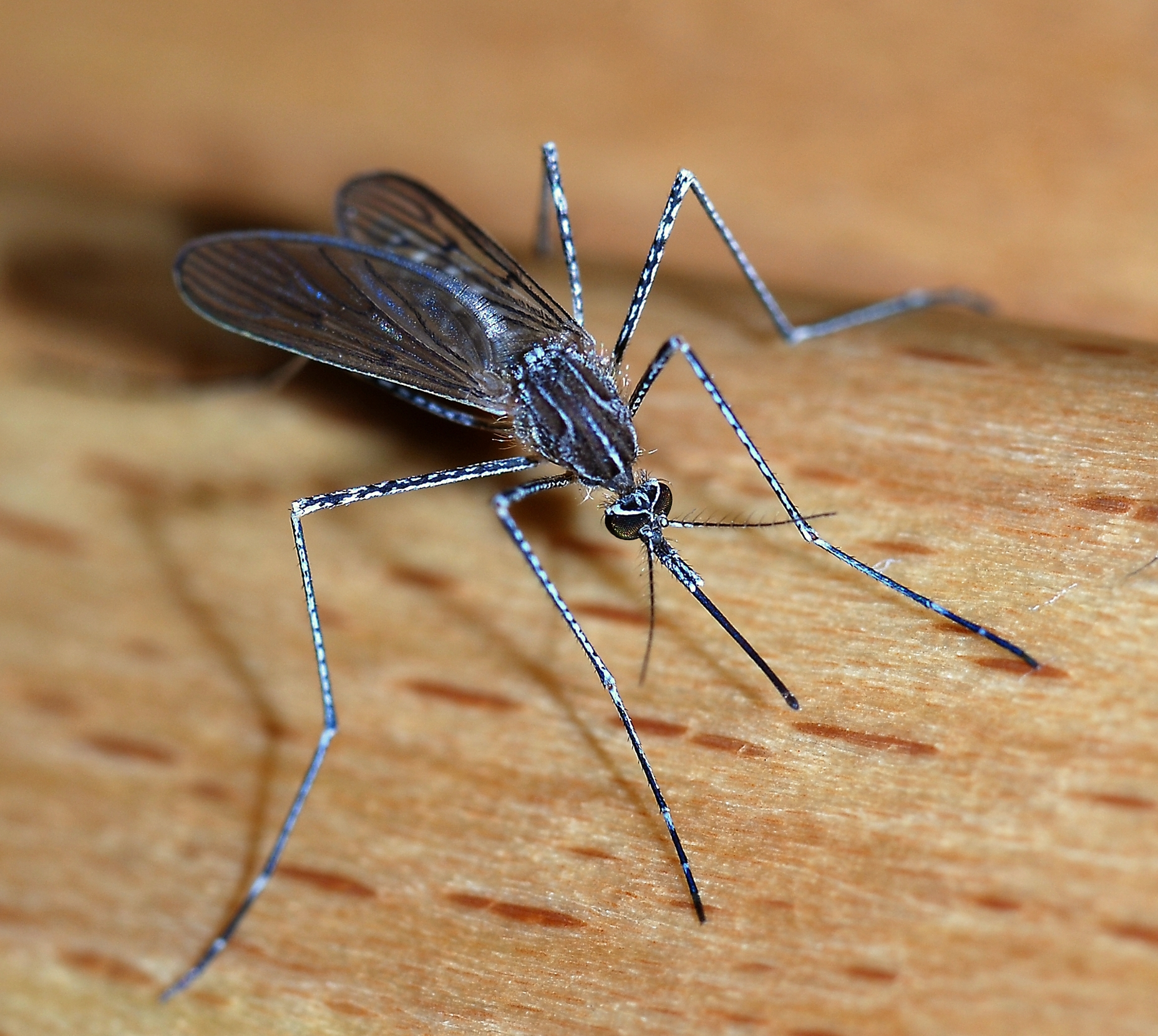
Culicine Mosquito

"A Malariologist like Sharma is to be credited for bringing the nation at the frontier of the international scientific community," S. K. Modi, founder of G. M. Modi Foundation, on V. P. Sharma, during the Gujar Mal Modi Award ceremony, "We, at The Gujar Mal Modi Science Foundation feel delighted and proud to recognize such invaluable research of our distinguished scientists, and will continue to be committed to carrying forward our efforts and dedication on bringing to light such achievements."

"Malaria continues to be among the biggest killer disease in the country," says Dr. V. P. Sharma, "and we have to take it head on through research and awareness."

Sharma started his career at the Forest Research Institute, in the high altitude area of Dehradun, as a Pool Officer, in 1969. A year later, he joined the World Health Organization sponsored Indian Council of Medical Research project as a Senior Scientist on genetic control of Culicine mosquitoes, in 1970, where he worked till 1975. The next move was to the Vector Control Research Centre and Malaria Research Unit, in 1976, as the deputy director, for a 2-year stint there. In 1978, he joined the Malaria Research Centre, New Delhi as its deputy director.

During his stint at the Malaria Research Centre, he started working on the upgradation of the centre and, as a result, the centre was upgraded by the Government of India, renaming it as the National Institute of Malaria Research, in 1982. Sharma was made its first director, a post from where he retired, in 1998, as Additional Director-General of Indian Council of Medical Research.

On his retirement from the government service, the Indian Council of Medical Research recognised Sharma's services by making him the Meghnad Saha Distinguished Fellow of the National Academy of Sciences (India) at the Centre for Rural Development and Technology, IIT Delhi.

He is also leading the Safe Water campaign initiated by National Academy of Sciences, India

== Major achievements ==
"We have to create a world order that is sensitive towards the environment," says Dr. V. P. Sharma, "and where development is modelled on ecological concerns."

Sharma has been credited with many scientific and research achievements. His studies on the chemo and radio sterilisation of male mosquitoes are well documented. He is credited with developing a new technique for sex separation of mosquitoes. He has also worked extensively on the bioenvironmental malaria control which led to many innovations in the subject. He is also acknowledged for his contributions to vector biology.

Sharma is known to have developed the Malaria Research Unit, New Delhi into a full-fledged Research Centre, the National Institute of Malaria Research (NIMR). He has also contributed to the popularisation of science, through his books, journals and education programs.

== Positions held ==
Vinod Prakash Sharma has held many positions of importance, by way of recognition and those of responsibility, throughout his career.

- Fellow of Royal Asiatic Society
- Fellow of the National Academy of Medical Sciences,
- Fellow of National Academy of Sciences (India), Allahabad
- Fellow of Indian Academy of Sciences, Bangalore
- Fellow of Entomology Society of India, New Delhi
- Fellow of National Environmental Science Academy, New Delhi
- Fellow of Indian Society for Parasitology
- Fellow of Indian Society of Malaria and other communicable diseases
- Honorary Fellow – Indian Academy of Environmental Sciences, Moradabad, Uttar Pradesh
- Honorary Fellow – Indian Academy of Environmental Sciences, Hardwar
- Fellow – Zoological Society of India
- President of National Academy of Vector borne Diseases
- President of National Academy of Sciences (India), Allahabad
- President of Indian Society for Parasitology
- Council Member – International Congress of Entomology
- board member – Malaria Foundation Incorporated
- Governing Council Member – ICMR
- Member – WHO Expert Committee on Malaria

== Awards and recognitions ==
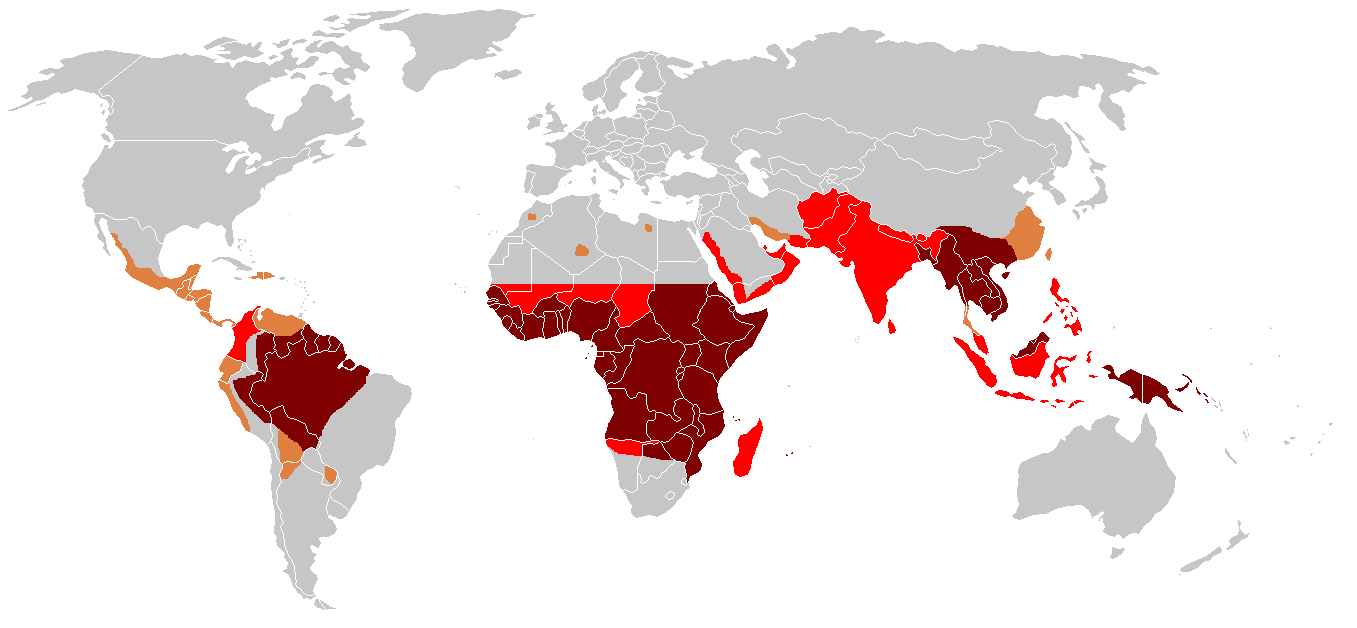
Distribution of malaria in the world:♦ Elevated occurrence of chloroquine- or multi-resistant malaria ♦ Occurrence of chloroquine-resistant malaria ♦ No Plasmodium falciparum or chloroquine-resistance ♦ No malaria

- Padma Bhushan – 2014
- Gujar Mal Modi Award – 2013
- Meghnad Saha Distinguished Fellowship
- Padma Shri – 1992
- WHO Darling Foundation Prize – 1999
- GI Inventions Award
- Chancellor's Prize
- M. O. T. Aiyengar Award
- B. R. Ambedkar Centenary Award – 2000
- Om Prakash Bhasin Award – 1985
- Ranbaxy Award – 1990
- M. L. Gupta Trust Award
- FICCI Cash Award – 1998
- Vaswik Award
- Green Scientist Award – 2001
- Best Scientist Award
- G. P. Chatterjee Memorial Award
- Dr. R. V. Rajaram Oration Award
- Dr. U. S. Srivastava Memorial Lecture Award
- Professor L. S. Ramaswami Memorial Oration Award
- Life Time Achievement Award by the Indian Society of Malaria and other communicable diseases
- B. N. Singh Oration Award
- B. K. Srivastava Oration Award
- Distinguished Parasitologist – World Parasitologist Federation (WPF) – 2010
- Gold Medal lifetime Achievement Award – Indian Academy of Environmental Sciences – 2012

== Works ==
Sharma was the Chief Editor of an important journal, the Journal of Parasitic Diseases, which was active in dissemination of knowledge by publishing reviews and research papers on a regular basis. He was also the Chief Editor of the in-house journal of the National Academy of Sciences, India.

He has also published many books on the subjects of bioenvironmental control and vector biology, both in English and Hindi languages.

Books in English

- K.J. Nath & V.P. Sharma (2008). Safe Water for community health. The National Academy of sciences, India Allahabad publication.
- P.P. Singh & V.P. Sharma (2010). Human Parasitic Infections of Pharmaceutical and National Health Importance. The National Academy of sciences, India Allahabad publication.
- V.P. Sharma (2010). Nature at Work: Ongoing Saga of Evolution. The National Academy of sciences, India Allahabad publication.
- P.P. Singh & V.P. Sharma (2014). Water and Health. Currently under production by Springer India/Germany. The National Academy of sciences, India Allahabad publication.
- Satyawati Sharma, Santosh Satya, Annushree Malik and V.P. Sharma (2014). Women and Development: Green Technologies. The National Academy of sciences, India Allahabad publication.

Books in Hindi

- V.P. Sharma (translated by Manvendra Tripathi) (2012). Malaria Anusandhan Se Rog Samadhan. The National Academy of sciences, India Allahabad publication.
- V.P. Sharma (translated by Manvendra Tripathi) (2014). Dengue and Chikungunya ka Vivran tatha Bachav aur Upchar. ICMR.

Apart from the books, Sharma has written over 300 research papers in various national and international journals.

- V. P. Sharma (2012). "Battling Malaria Iceberg Incorporating Strategic Reforms in Achieving Millennium Development Goals and Malaria Elimination in India". Indian Journal of Medical Research. 136 (6): 907–925. PMC 3612321. PMID 23391787.
- V. P. Sharma (2012). "Continuing challenge of malaria in India". Current Science. 102 (5): 678–682.
- Jacob John, T., Lalit Dandona, Vinod P Sharma, Manish Kakkar (2011). "Continuing challenge of malaria in India". The Lancet. 377 (9761): 252–269. doi:10.1016/s0140-6736(10)61265-2. PMID 21227500. S2CID 28464897.
- Sharma V. P .; Prabhat Jha; Neeraj Dhingra; Raju M Jotkar; Richard Peto (2011). "Malaria-attributed death rates in India". The Lancet. 377 (9770): 994–995. doi:10.1016/s0140-6736(11)60383-8. S2CID 205962145.
- Cohen, Alan A., Neeraj Dhingra, Raju M Jotkar, Peter S Rodriguez, Vinod P Sharma and Prabhat Jha (2010). "The Summary Index of Malaria Surveillance (SIMS): a stable index of malaria within India". Population Health Metrics. 8 (1): 1. doi:10.1186/1478-7954-8-1. PMC 2847540. PMID 20181218.
- Neeraj Dhingra N; Prabhat Jha; Vinod P Sharma; Alan A Cohen; Raju M Jotkar; Peter S Rodriguez; Diego G Bassani; Wilson Suraweera; Ramanan Laxminarayan; Richard Peto (2010). "Adult and child malaria mortality in India: a nationally representative mortality survey". The Lancet. 376 (9754): 1768–1774. doi:10.1016/s0140-6736(10)60831-8. PMC 3021416. PMID 20970179.
- Vinod P Sharma (2009). "Accelerating the Pace of Roll Back Malaria in India". Proc. Natl. Acad. Sci. India. 79(B) (special issue): 13–21.
- Jacob John, T., Lalit Dandona, Vinod P Sharma, Manish Kakkar (2011). "Hidden burden of malaria in Indian women". Malaria Journal. 8 (281): 252–269. doi:10.1186/1475-2875-8-281. PMC 2799428. PMID 19995437.
- Vinod P Sharma, ed. (2008). "Work of WHO: Malaria In: Sixty Years of WHO". South East Asia Regional Office of the World Health Organization, New Delhi.
- M. G. K. Menon & V. P. Sharma (2008). "Malaria and Other Vector Borne Diseases in South Asia. In: Sustainable Management of Water resources: Emerging Science and Technology Issues in South Asia". INSA (9761).
