= G. S. Venkataraman =

Indian botanist and academic (1930–1998)

G. S Venkataraman
- Born: Gopalasamudram Saetharama Venkataraman; 1 February 1930; Tenkasi, Tirunalveli district, Tamil Nadu, India
- Died: October 3, 1998 (aged 68)
- Occupations: Botanist; Phycologist
- Years active: 1956–1998
- Known for: Algology
- Parent(s): G. R. Sitaraman; Lokanayaki
- Awards: Padma Shri; Alagappa Gold Medal; VASVIK Industrial Research Award; Sanjay Gandhi Award; UGC National Lecturer Award; Om Prakash Bhasin Award

Gopalasamudram Sitaraman Venkataraman (February 1, 1930 – October 3, 1998) was an Indian botanist, academic and the director of the Indian Agricultural Research Institute (IARI), New Delhi. He was also a director of the DBT Centre for Blue-Green Algae at Madurai Kamaraj University and a recipient of the VASVIK Industrial Research Award and Om Prakash Bhasin Award. The Government of India awarded him the fourth highest civilian honour of the Padma Shri in 1992.

== Biography ==
Venkataraman was born on 1 February 1930 to Lokanayaki and G. R. Sitaraman, a freedom fighter, at a small hamlet in Tirunelveli district by name, Tenkasi, in the south Indian state of Tamil Nadu. His early education was at the local village school after which he did his intermediate (higher secondary) from St. Xavier's College, Palayamkottai. At Alagappa Chettiar College, Karaikudi, where he joined for his graduate studies, he had the opportunity to learn under S. Doraisamy, an algologist and a protégé of M. O. P. Iyengar, a renowned phycologist. His master's degree came from Banaras Hindu University and, on getting a Government of India fellowship, he pursued doctoral studies under the guidance of Y. Bharadwaja and secured a PhD and DSc from the same university.

His career started as an Assistant Botanist at the Indian Agricultural Research Institute in 1956. With the guidance of M. S. Randhawa, then Vice-President of the Indian Council of Agricultural Research, he established an algal research centre at the institute which is known to have conducted research on Algae and published several research papers and books on the subject. Through his researches, he established the role of algae in agriculture as a nitrogen fixing agent which was accepted by Food and Agriculture Organization (FAO), among others. He also initiated master's and doctoral courses in Agricultural Phycology at the institute to foster research and for training manpower. Supported by a grant from the Department of Biotechnology, he also established a national facility for the collection and distribution of Blue-green algae (BGA) cultures.

When the Department of Science and Technology initiated a national level project on Algae for fertilizer, feed and fuel in 1976, Venkataraman was selected to head the project as its director. The project, which had state and central participation, is reported to have been successful in the dissemination knowledge on BGA bio-fertilizers among Indian farming community. His studies revealed the importance of rice strain selection as he maintained that different strains have differing ability and adaptability vis-à-vis soil conditions, resistance to pesticides and insensitivity to sources of nitrogen like nitrates and Ammonium. He demonstrated the transfer of fixed nitrogen from algae to rice plants using 15N. He also developed a method for the in situ production of the BGA bio-fertilizer which he later improved by growing pure cultures of BGA on solid organic substrates, an achievement during his days at the School of Biological Sciences of Madurai Kamaraj University.

Venkataraman's book, The Cultivation of Algae, published by the Indian Council of Agricultural Research (ICAR) in 1969, is a monograph on the culture and cultivation of algae while the 1974 publication, Algae: form and function, and Vaucheriaceae, deal with the scientific aspects of Algae. Two other books, Algal biofertilizers and rice cultivation and Blue-green algae for rice production : a manual for its promotion detail the algal applications in agriculture and one of the books he edited, Plant protection in the year 2000 AD covers the papers and proceedings of the conference held at New Delhi in December 1984. He was the editor of another book, Cyanobacterial biotechnology, a presentation of selected papers from the International Symposium on Cyanobacterial Biotechnology, held in Tiruchirappalli in September 1996. He also published over 170 articles on the subject.

Venkataraman served as the Editor-in-Chief of the Journal of Phycology and was a member of the editorial boards of Biological Wastes and MIRCEN Journal of Applied Microbiology and Biotechnology. He was the Editor of the INSA scientific publications from 1983 to 1986 and a member of the sectional committee and the council of the Indian National Science Academy. He was associated with the International Rice Research Institute as a member of its Policy Advisory Committee on Microbiological Nitrogen Fixation and was a director of the Indo-US Science and Technology Collaborative Programme in Agriculture. He served as the visiting professor at Japan Agriculture Society and was a consultant to the Food and Agriculture Organization.

Venkataraman died on 3 October 1998, at the age of 68.

== Awards and honours ==
Venkitaraman's memoirs have been included in the 24th volume of Biographical Memoirs of Fellows of the Indian National Science Academy, a compendium periodically published by the Indian National Science Academy, featuring its deceased and living fellows. The Indian Academy of Sciences elected him as their fellow in 1974 and the Indian National Science Academy followed suit in 1984. He was also an elected fellow of the National Academy of Sciences, India and a fellow of the National Geographical Society and Phycological Society of India. He received the VASVIK Industrial Research Award in 1978, Sanjay Gandhi Award for Science and Technology, four years later and the National Lecturer Award of the University Grants Commission in 1986. In 1988, he was awarded the Om Prakash Bhasin Award by the Om Prakash Bhasin Foundation for his contributions to Agriculture and Allied Sciences. The Government of India included him in the 1992 Republic Day honours list for the civilian award of the Padma Shri.

Venkataraman, who was a holder of Humboldt Research Fellowship, delivered several award lectures including the Professor Panchanan Maheshwari Memorial Award Lecture of the Indian National Science Academy. He was also a recipient of the Alagappa Gold medal for his academic excellence from his alma mater, Alagappa Chettiyar College and the Australian Bicentennial International Medal in 1988 from Melbourne Poetry Society for his poem anthology, Reactions, published in 1986. He was one of the 56 Tamil personalities covered in Arunthondu Aatriya Tamizhaga Andhanargal, a compilation of biographies, published in Tamil language.
