= T. S. R. Prasada Rao =

Indian engineer (1939–2022)

- Born: 20 January 1939; Pedapudi, Andhra Pradesh, India
- Died: 7 April 2022 (aged 83); Hyderabad, India
- Awards: 2014 Petrotech Lifetime Achievement Award; 1998 Chemtech Outstanding Scientist Award (1998); 1996 Om Prakash Bhasin Award; 1996 CSI Eminent Scientist Award; 1996 K. G. Naik Gold Medal; 1995 K. Kumari National Award for Science & Technology; 1995 S.K. Lal Memorial Science & Technology Award; 1994 Bharatiya Sanskriti Puraskar; 1994 Delhi Telugu Academy Eminent Scientist Award; 1993 FICCI Award for Physical Sciences; 1992 IICE Kuloor Memorial Award; 1985 ICMA Forward Technology Development Award; CSIR Technology Award
- Scientific career
- Fields: Petroleum engineering
- Institutions: Sarasijam Technologies; Indian Institute of Petroleum; Indian Petrochemicals Corporation Limited

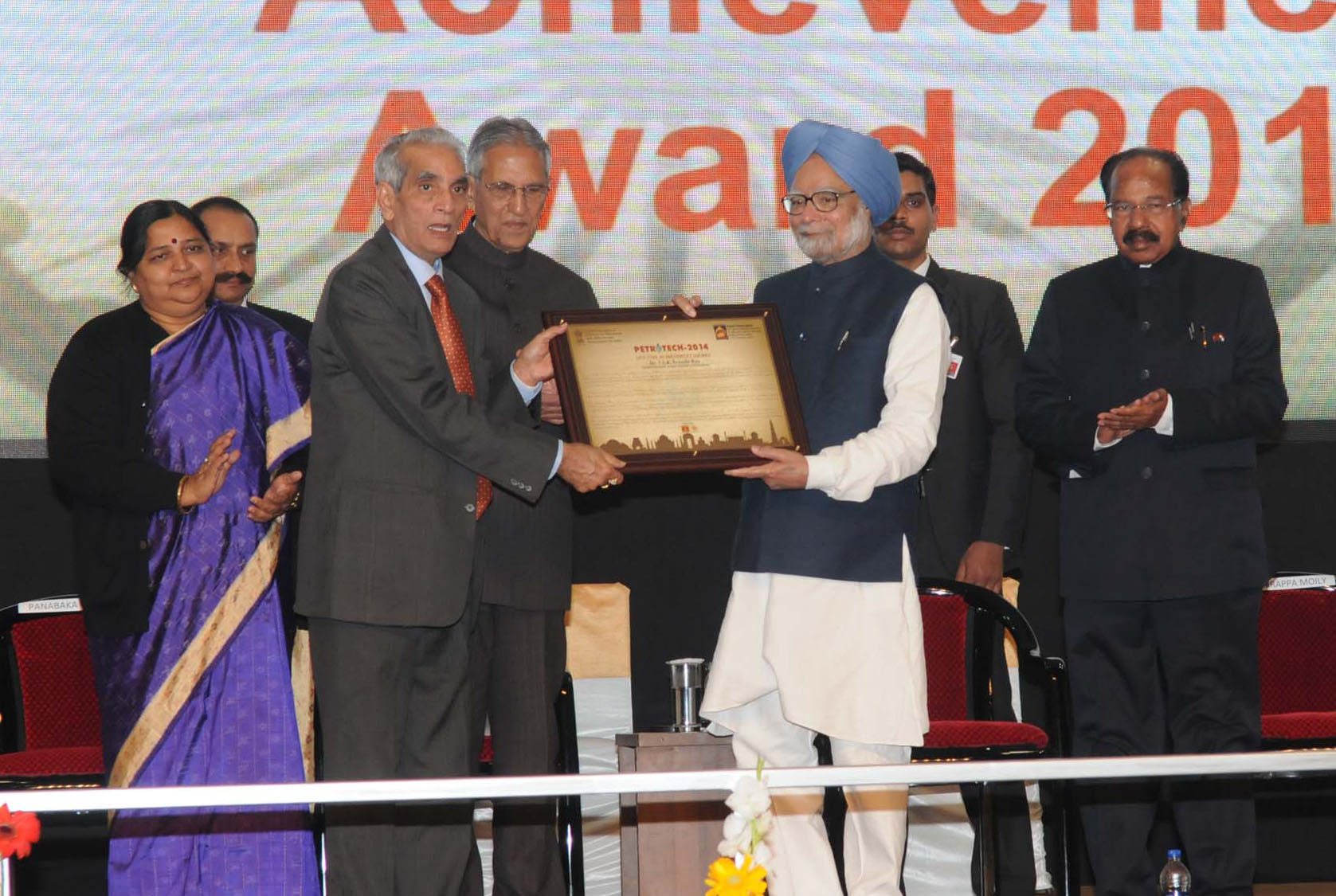
Manmohan Singh presenting the Life Time Achievement Award 2014 to the former Director, Indian Institute of Petroleum, Dr. T.S.R. Prasada Rao.jpg

Turaga Sundara Rama Prasada Rao (20 January 1939 – 7 April 2022) was an Indian engineer, known for his contributions in the fields of petroleum refining and heterogeneous catalysis. He was a former director of the Indian Institute of Petroleum and a former deputy general manager of the Indian Petrochemicals Corporation Limited. He was known for his studies in heterogeneous catalysis for petrochemical and refining processes; his studies have been documented by way of a number of articles (Note: Please see Selected bibliography section) and Google Scholar, an online repository of scientific articles has listed 123 of them. He also co-edited a book, Recent Advances in Basic and Applied Aspects of Industrial Catalysis, published by Elsevier.

Born on 20 January 1939, Rao was an elected fellow of Indian National Academy of Engineering, and the Indian Academy of Sciences. He was also a member of Andhra Pradesh Akademi of Sciences, Indian Institute of Chemical Engineers, and New York Academy of Sciences. He shared the 1996 Om Prakash Bhasin Award for Engineering with M. R. Srinivasan and C. G. Krishnadas Nair. He received the Petrotech Lifetime Achievement Award in 2004. He was also a recipient of several other honors including Chemtech Outstanding Scientist Award, K. G. Naik Gold Medal, FICCI Award Technology Award of the Council of Scientific and Industrial Research.

Rao died in Hyderabad on 7 April 2022, at the age of 83.

== Selected bibliography ==
=== Books ===
- T.S.R. Prasada Rao; G. Murali Dhar (25 February 1998). Recent Advances in Basic and Applied Aspects of Industrial Catalysis. Elsevier. ISBN 978-0-08-054038-2.

=== Articles ===
- Maity, S.K; Rana, M.S; Srinivas, B.N; Bej, S.K; Murali Dhar, G; Prasada Rao, T.S.R (March 2000). "Characterization and evaluation of ZrO2 supported hydrotreating catalysts". Journal of Molecular Catalysis A: Chemical. 153 (1–2): 121–127. doi:10.1016/s1381-1169(99)00311-8. ISSN 1381-1169.
- Maity, S.K.; Rana, M.S.; Bej, S.K.; Ancheyta-Juárez, J.; Murali Dhar, G.; Prasada Rao, T.S.R. (January 2001). "Studies on physico-chemical characterization and catalysis on high surface area titania supported molybdenum hydrotreating catalysts". Applied Catalysis A: General. 205 (1–2): 215–225. doi:10.1016/s0926-860x(00)00567-6. ISSN 0926-860X.
- Sahoo, S.K.; Viswanadham, N.; Ray, N.; Gupta, J.K.; Singh, I.D. (January 2001). "Studies on acidity, activity and coke deactivation of ZSM-5 during n-heptane aromatization". Applied Catalysis A: General. 205 (1–2): 1–10. doi:10.1016/s0926-860x(00)00543-3. ISSN 0926-860X.
- Rana, M.S.; Srinivas, B.N.; Maity, S.K.; Murali Dhar, G.; Prasada Rao, T.S.R. (October 2000). "Origin of Cracking Functionality of Sulfided (Ni) CoMo/SiO2–ZrO2 Catalysts". Journal of Catalysis. 195 (1): 31–37. doi:10.1006/jcat.2000.2968. ISSN 0021-9517.
- Rana, M.S.; Maity, S.K.; Ancheyta, J.; Dhar, G.Murali; Prasada Rao, T.S.R. (October 2003). "TiO2–SiO2 supported hydrotreating catalysts: physico-chemical characterization and activities". Applied Catalysis A: General. 253 (1): 165–176. doi:10.1016/s0926-860x(03)00502-7. ISSN 0926-860X.
