= P. V. S. Rao =

Indian computer scientist (born 1936)

- Born: July 17, 1936 (age 89); Berhampur, Orissa, British India
- Spouse: Vijayalakshmi
- Parent(s): Venkata Suryanarayana; Ramalakshmamma
- Awards: Padma Shri; Vikram Sarabhai Award; Om Prakash Bhasin Award; VASVIK Industrial Research Award; Lifetime Achievement Award (CSI); IEEE Millennium Medal

Paranandi Venkata Suryanarayana Rao is an Indian computer scientist, known for his research in the fields of speech and script recognition and is credited with contributions to the development of TIFRAC, the first indigenously developed electronic computer in India. He is a recipient of awards such as IEEE Third Millenium Medal, Vikram Sarabhai Award, Om Prakash Bhasin Award and VASVIK Industrial Research Award. The Government of India awarded him the fourth highest civilian honour of Padma Shri in 1987.

== Biography ==
P. V. S. Rao was born on 17 July 1936 to Venkata Suryanarayana and Ramalakshmamma Paranandi in Berhampur, in the Indian state of Odisha. He graduated in science from Utkal University in 1953 and secured a master's degree in science (Physics) from Banaras Hindu University in 1955. Rao joined the Tata Institute of Fundamental Research (TIFR) in the R&D department of computers in 1955. He obtained a doctoral degree in Physics for his work on the display of text and graphics on computer screens from the University of Mumbai.

He worked there for 43 years and at the time of his retirement in 1998, he was serving as senior professor and head of the Computer Systems and Communications Group. During his tenure at TIFR, he worked as the Project Director of a sponsored project on Air Defence Systems (1972–84), and a research project on Knowledge-based Computer Systems sponsored jointly by the United Nations Development Program and the Government of India. He was Professor and Head of the Speech and Digital Systems Group (later named the Computer Systems and Communications Group, 1978–82) and Senior Professor and the Head of the Computer Systems and Communications Group (1980–98).

Rao was involved in the development of TIFRAC, the first electronic computer developed in India in 1955. After its commissioning in 1959, he was involved with computer research activities at the University of Illinois and took part in the development of ILLIAC II, which was commissioned in 1962, in areas related to memory systems. Later, he headed the development of OLDAP, another TIFR computer project. He was associated with several government agencies, including the Technology Development Council and chaired the Working Group on Computers of Electronics Commission of the Government of India.

He also sat on the governing council of the Indian Statistical Institute and the board of CMC Limited. He was President of the Computer Society of India (1980–82) and Chairman of the All India Council of the Institute of Electronics and Electrical Engineering (1981–83). He also served as a member of the editorial committees of journals such as IEICE Transactions on Fundamentals of Electronics and Journal of Computer Science and Technology. He was the author of three books, An Introduction to Computer Programming in FORTRAN and other Languages (1980), BASIC Elementary, Standard and Enhanced (1989) and Trends in Computer Architecture: An In-depth Perspective (1991) and contributed a chapter to another book, Data Conversion Principles.

== Awards and honours ==
Rao is an elected Fellow of the Indian Academy of Sciences, the Indian National Science Academy, the National Academy of Sciences (India), and the Computer Society of India and the Acoustical Society of India. Distinguished Fellow of the Institute of Electrical and Electronics Engineers, and a Senior Member and Distinguished Visitor of the Institution of Electronics and Telecommunication Engineers. He received the Vikram Sarabhai Award from Hari Om Ashram, Gujarat in 1976. Three major awards reached him in 1987, the Om Prakash Bhasin Award from the O. P. Bhasin Foundation, the VASVIK Industrial Research Award from Vividhlakshi Audyogik Samshodhan Vikas Kendra and the civilian honour of Padma Shri from the Government of India. The Computer Society of India honoured him with a Lifetime Achievement Award in 2012.

== See also ==
- TIFRAC
- Tata Institute of Fundamental Research
