= Surendra Prasad =

Indian communications engineer

- Born: 10 July 1948 (age 78); India
- Education: IIT Kharagpur; IIT Delhi; Loughborough University
- Known for: Studies on Signal processing
- Awards: 1987 Vikram Sarabhai Research Award; 1988 Shanti Swarup Bhatnagar Prize; 1994 Om Prakash Bhasin Award; 2006 VASVIK Award; 2007 SySI Rajkumar Varshney Award; 2007 IIT Kharagpur Distinguished Alumnus Award
- Scientific career
- Fields: Electrical engineering; Communications engineering
- Workplaces: IIT Delhi; Bharti School of Telecom Technology and Management; Pennsylvania State University

Surendra Prasad (born 1948) is an Indian communications engineer, a former director and an Usha chair professor of the Indian Institute of Technology, Delhi. He is also an emeritus professor of Bharti School of Telecommunication Technology And Management, a joint venture of IIT Delhi and is known for developing new techniques, algorithms and hardware in signal processing. He is an elected fellow of all the three major Indian science academies viz. Indian Academy of Sciences, Indian National Science Academy and the National Academy of Sciences, India. as well as the Indian National Academy of Engineering. The Council of Scientific and Industrial Research, the apex agency of the Government of India for scientific research, awarded him the Shanti Swarup Bhatnagar Prize for Science and Technology, one of the highest Indian science awards for his contributions to Engineering Sciences in 1988. (Note: Long link - please select award year to see details)

== Biography ==
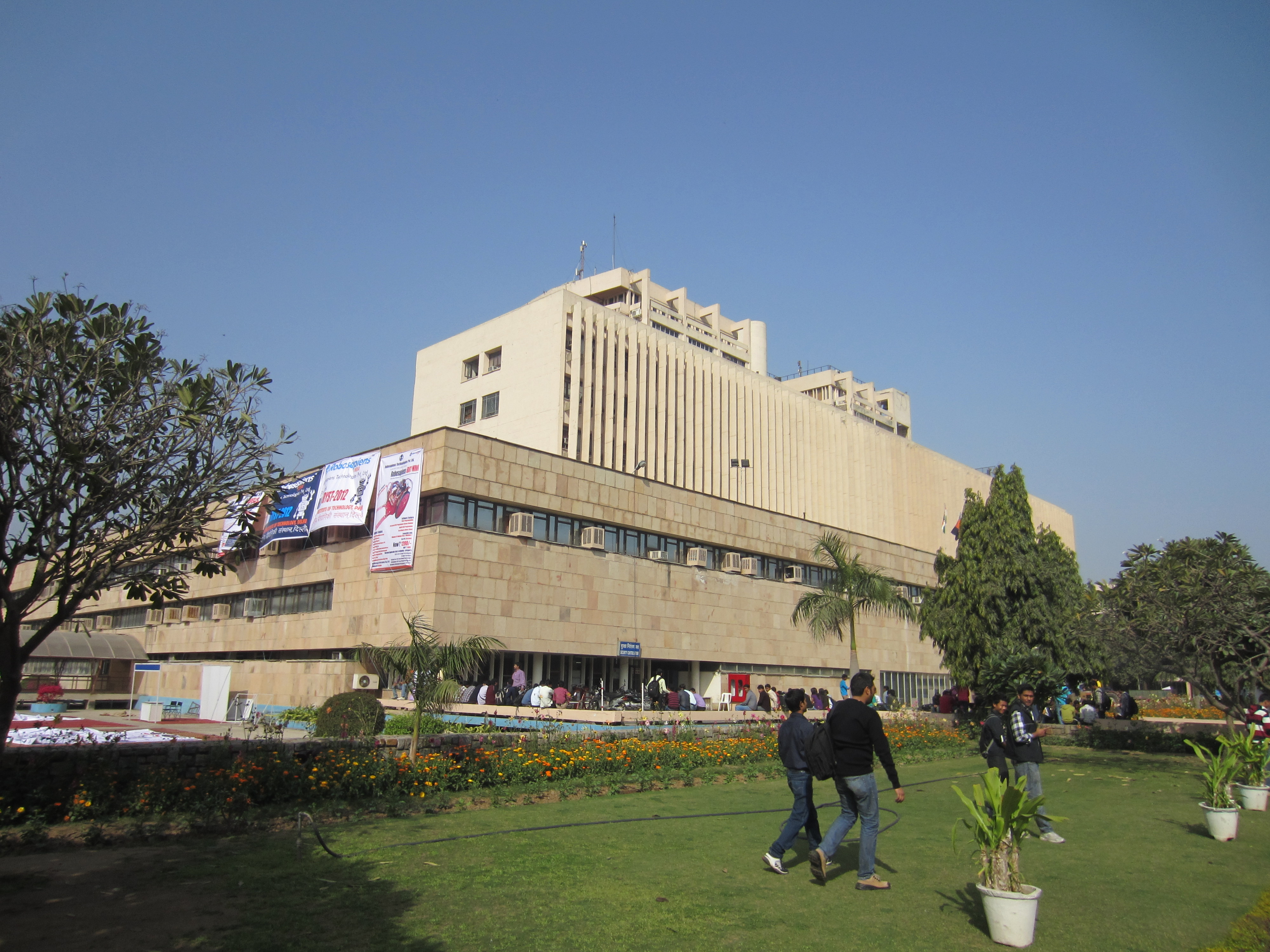
Indian Institute of Technology, Delhi

Surendra Prasad, born on 10 July 1948, did his graduate studies in electronics and electrical communication engineering and after passing BTech from the Indian Institute of Technology, Kharagpur in 1969, he moved to the Indian Institute of Technology, Delhi from where he completed MTech in 1971. Subsequently, he joined IIT Delhi the same year as a member of faculty and simultaneously enrolled for his doctoral studies there to secure a PhD in 1974. In 1976, he took a sabbatical to work at Loughborough University of Technology as a visiting research fellow and returning to India in 1977, he resumed his career at IIT Delhi where he served till his superannuation as the director, a post he held from 2006 to 2011. In between, he had a second stint abroad at Pennsylvania State University as a visiting faculty during 1985–86. At IIT Delhi, he served in various positions as a professor, coordinator of the Bharti School of Telecom Technology and Management (BSTTM), dean of undergraduate studies and deputy director. Post-retirement, he is an Usha Chair Professor at IIT Delhi and an emeritus professor at BSTTM. He also serves as the chair of the National Board of Accreditation (NBA), an autonomous agency of the All India Council of Technical Education.

Prasad's wife is also an academic at University of Delhi and the family lives in Gurgaon, a city in the National Capital Region of India. One of the two sons of the couple died an unnatural death in 2015.

== Legacy ==
Prasad's early researches have been primarily in the fields of Signal Processing, Communication Theory and Speech Processing and he is known to have contributed to the development of new techniques, algorithms and hardware. He is reported to have done notable work on optimum signals and receivers, array pattern synthesis, optimum MTI filters, time delay estimation and underwater data communication, deconvolution of seismic signals and silicon compilation; the last one having applications in the designing of very large scale integrated circuits. Later, he worked on broadband communications, specifically on Very-high-bit-rate digital subscriber line (VDSL) and Wireless communications. His researches have been documented in several peer-reviewed articles; (Note: Please see Selected articles section) the online article repository of Indian Academy of Sciences has listed 67 of them. He is the author of a number of video courses on communications engineering and has been associated with several government agencies including the Council of Scientific and Industrial Research as a member of its governing body and society (CSIR Society). He has edited three books and served as the guest editor of Journal of Research of the Institution of Electronics and Telecommunication Engineers for its June 2015 issue. He was also on the jury panel for the ICT Business Awards for the year 2014.

== Awards and honors ==
Prasad received Vikram Sarabhai Research Award in 1987 and the Council of Scientific and Industrial Research awarded him the Shanti Swarup Bhatnagar Prize, one of the highest Indian science awards in 1988. Six years later, he was selected for the 1994 Om Prakash Bhasin Award and the VASVIK Industrial Research Award reached him in 2006. The year 2007 brought him two awards; Systems Society of India awarded him the Rajkumar Varshney Award for lifetime achievement in systems theory and his alma mater, Indian Institute of Kharagpur chose him for the Distinguished Alumnus Award. Besides, he became a graduand of Loughborough University when he received the degree of Doctor of Technology (honoris causa) in July 2007. He was elected as a fellow by the Indian National Science Academy in 1994 and the Indian Academy of Sciences followed suit in 1997. He became an elected fellow of the National Academy of Sciences, India in 2009. He is also a fellow of the Indian National Academy of Engineering. The award orations delivered by him include 2010 Kariamanikkam Srinivasa Krishnan Memorial Lecture of the Indian National Science Academy.

== Selected bibliography ==
=== Selected articles ===
- Agrawal M., S. (2000). "A modified likelihood function approach to DOA estimation in the presence of unknown spatially correlated Gaussian noise using a uniform linear array". IEEE Transactions on Signal Processing. 48 (10): 2743–2749. Bibcode:2000ITSP...48.2743A. doi:10.1109/78.869024.
- Agrawal M., Prasad S., Dutta Roy S. C. (2001). "A simple solution for the analytic inversion of Van der Monde and Confluent Van der Monde matrices". IETE Journal of Research. 47 (5): 217–219. doi:10.1080/03772063.2001.11416229. S2CID 120342460.
- Al-Bayati A. K. S., Prakriya S., Prasad S. (2003). "Block modulus precoding for blind multiuser detection of DS-CDMA signals". IEEE Transactions on Communications. 51 (1): 52–56. Bibcode:2003ITCom..51...52A. doi:10.1109/TCOMM.2002.807599.
- Al-Bayati A. K. S., Prakriya S., Prasad S. (2004). "Block phase-precoding for blind multiuser detection of BPSK/DS-CDMA signals". IEEE Transactions on Communications. 52 (7): 1043–1046. Bibcode:2004ITCom..52.1043A. doi:10.1109/TCOMM.2004.831355. S2CID 6396500.
- Gupta A., Joshi S. D., Prasad S. (2005). "A new approach for estimation of statistically matched wavelet". IEEE Transactions on Signal Processing. 53 (5): 1778–1793. Bibcode:2005ITSP...53.1778G. doi:10.1109/TSP.2005.845470. S2CID 786749.

=== Selected video lectures ===
- Surendra Prasad (15 September 2013). "Introduction to Communication Engineering - Lecture 1". Video lecture. National Programming on Technology Enhanced Learning (NPTEL).
- Surendra Prasad (15 September 2013). "Communication channel - Lecture 2". Video lecture. National Programming on Technology Enhanced Learning (NPTEL).
- Surendra Prasad (15 September 2013). "Brief Review of Signal and Systems - Lecture 3". Video lecture. National Programming on Technology Enhanced Learning (NPTEL).
- Surendra Prasad (15 September 2013). "The Hilbert Transform - Lecture 4". Video lecture. National Programming on Technology Enhanced Learning (NPTEL).
- Surendra Prasad (21 September 2013). "Analytic Representation of bandpass Signals - Lecture 5". Video lecture. National Programming on Technology Enhanced Learning (NPTEL).

== See also ==
- Code division multiple access
- Vandermonde matrix
