= Brahm Shanker Srivastava =

Indian microbiologist

- Born: 1 June 1943 (age 83); Uttar Pradesh
- Education: Banaras Hindu University; University of Brussels
- Known for: Studies on microbial genetics
- Awards: 1984 Shanti Swarup Bhatnagar Prize; 1995 Om Prakash Bhasin Award; 2002 GoUP Vigyan Ratna Samman
- Scientific career
- Fields: Molecular biology; Biotechnology
- Workplaces: Biotech Research; Jawaharlal Nehru University; Central Drug Research Institute; Brown University; University of Maryland; Pasteur Institute of Lille; University of Ancona; Banaras Hindu University; Mizoram University

Brahm Shanker Srivastava (born 1943) is an Indian microbiologist, inventor and a former deputy director and head of Microbiology division of the Central Drug Research Institute. He is the founder of Biotech Research, a non-profit non governmental institution promoting research in the field of biotechnology and is a director of Nextec Lifesciences Private Limited, a start up involved in biomedical products and research applications. He is known for his researches on microbial genetics and is an elected fellow of the National Academy of Sciences, India.

The Council of Scientific and Industrial Research, the apex agency of the Government of India for scientific research, awarded him the Shanti Swarup Bhatnagar Prize for Science and Technology, one of the highest Indian science awards for his contributions to Medical Sciences in 1984. (Note: Long link – please select award year to see details)

== Biography ==
B. S. Srivastava, born on 1 June 1943, earned his graduate degree from Banaras Hindu University and continued his studies at BHU to secure his masters' and doctoral degrees. Most of his academic career was spent at Jawaharlal Nehru University where he became a professor and the founder chair of the Centre for Biotechnology. Subsequently, he moved to the Central Drug Research Institute where he headed the Division of Microbiology and served as the deputy director of the institute. In 2012, along with Ranjana Srivastava, he founded Biotech Research, a not-for-profit research platform for promoting research in biotechnology. In between, he served at a number of universities which included Brown University, University of Maryland, Pasteur Institute of Lille, University of Ancona, Banaras Hindu University and Mizoram University as a visiting faculty.

Srivastava's researches covered the discipline of microbial genetics and he has done extensive studies of Vibrio cholerae. He is credited with the development of bacterial mutants which have applications in vaccine development and he holds a patent for his work. He has documented his researches by way of several articles in per-reviewed journals (Note: Please see Selected bibliography section) and his work has been cited by a number of authors and researchers. Besides, he has also contributed chapters to books published by others. He was associated with the Indo-US Vaccine Action Program as a member and traveled with the Indian delegation on Biotechnology which visited the US and China.

== Awards and honors ==
The Council of Scientific and Industrial Research awarded him Shanti Swarup Bhatnagar Prize, one of the highest Indian science awards in 1984. He received Om Prakash Bhasin Award in 1995 and the Government of Uttar Pradesh honored him with Vigyan Ratna Samman in 2002. He is an elected fellow of the National Academy of Sciences, India and the American Academy of Microbiology. (Note: Long link – please search for Srivastava) The award orations delivered by him include Dr. Nitya Anand Endowment Lecture of the Indian National Science Academy in 1991 and Dr. Y.S. Narayana Rao Oration of the Indian Council of Medical Research in 1993.

== Selected bibliography ==
- Prem raj P, Srivastava S, Jain SK, Srivastava BS, Srivastava R (2003). "Protection by live Mycobacterium habana vaccine against Mycobacterium tuberculosis H37Rv challenge in mice". The Indian Journal of Medical Research. 117: 139–145. PMID 14604301.
- D.K. Deb, P. Dahiya, K.K. Srivastava, R. Srivastava, B.S. Srivastava (2002). "Selective identification of new therapeutic targets of Mycobacterium tuberculosis by IVIAT approach". Tuberculosis. 82 (4–5): 175–182. doi:10.1054/tube.2002.0337. PMID 12464489.
- Deb DK, Srivastava KK, Srivastava R, Srivastava BS (2000). "Bioluminescent Mycobacterium aurum expressing firefly luciferase for rapid and high throughput screening of antimycobacterial drugs in vitro and in infected macrophages". Biochemical and Biophysical Research Communications. 279 (2): 457–461. Bibcode:2000BBRC..279..457D. doi:10.1006/bbrc.2000.3957. PMID 11118308.
- H. N. Singh, B. S. Srivastava (1968). "Studies on morphogenesis in a blue-green alga. I. Effect of inorganic nitrogen sources on developmental morphology of Anabaena doliolum". Canadian Journal of Microbiology. 14 (12): 1341–1346. doi:10.1139/m68-224. PMID 5710271.

== See also ==
- Mycobacterium tuberculosis
