= George Joseph (scientist) =

Indian space scientist (born 1938)

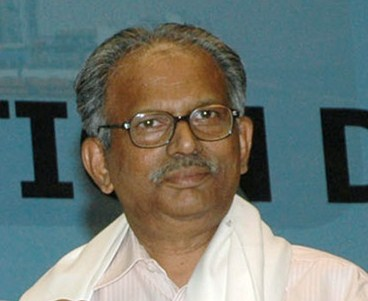
- Born: 4 August 1938 (age 88); Chengannur, Madras Presidency, British India
- Known for: Pioneering contribution to the Indian space programme in the area of earth observation technology.
- Awards: Padma Bhushan (1999)
- Scientific career
- Fields: Satellite Imaging Sensors, Remote Sensing and Space Science
- Workplaces: Space Applications Center, Indian Space Research Organization, Center for Space Science and Technology Education in Asia and the Pacific (affiliated to UN)
- Website: www.profgeorgej.com

George Joseph (born 4 August 1938) is an Indian space scientist, best known for his contributions to the development of remote sensing technology in India, especially Earth observation sensors. He is a former chairman of the Lunar Mission Study Task Force of the Indian Space Research Organization (ISRO) and an elected fellow of the National Academy of Sciences, India, Indian Academy of Sciences and Indian National Academy of Engineering. The Government of India awarded him the Padma Bhushan, the third highest civilian award, in 1999.

== Early life ==
George Joseph was born on 4 August 1938 to Advocate MG Joseph and Alice. After completing schooling, he joined St. Berchmans College, Changanassery and also studied at Alagappa Chettiar College in Karaikudi and University College, Trivandrum. He served as lecturer at Union Christian College, Aluva and at CMS College Kottayam. Afterwards he was a trainee at Bhabha Atomic Research Center (BARC), Bombay.

Joseph is married to Mercy and they have two sons.

== Research career ==
Joseph started his research career in 1962 at the Tata Institute of Fundamental Research in Bombay, where he was involved in the study of cosmic rays. Based on his research work at the Tata Institute he was awarded a PhD degree by the Bombay University. A novel detector system he designed was flown on the first Indian satellite Aryabhata (satellite) to detect solar neutrons.

== Contributions to the Indian space programme ==
In 1973, Joseph was invited to join the Space Applications Centre, Ahmedabad-one of the centers of ISRO, and initiated the development of remote sensing technology particularly sensors of various types. He has been the guiding force in the design and development of all the earth observation cameras on board Indian Remote Sensing Satellite and INSAT. He served the ISRO in various capacities including director of its Space Applications Centre and took keen interest and initiative to ensure the fruits of space technology reach common man. One of his contributions is the study report on Indian Mission to the Moon in the capacity as chairman of the Lunar Mission Study Task Force.

Joseph has served in a number of national and international committees/organizations including president of Technical Commission – I of the International Society for Photogrammetry and Remote Sensing during 1996–2000 and director of the Centre for Space Science and Technology Education in Asia and the Pacific (affiliated to the United Nations), with headquarters at Dehradun during 2006–2009.

=== Positions held ===
- 2010-2018: Honorary Distinguished Professor, Indian Space Research Organization
- 2006-2009: Director, Centre for Space Science and Technology Education in Asia and the Pacific
- 2003-2006: Honorary Distinguished Professor, Indian Space Research Organization
- 1998-2003: Satish Dhawan Distinguished Professor
- 1994-1998: Director, Space Applications Centre, Ahmedabad
- 1990-1994: Associate Director, Space Applications Centre, Ahmedabad
- 1985-1994: Dy. Director (Remote Sensing), Space Applications Centre, Ahmedabad
- 1975-1985: Head, Sensor Development Division, Space Applications Centre, Ahmedabad
- 1973-1975: Scientist/Engineer, Remote Sensing & Meteorology Applications Division, Space Applications Centre, Ahmedabad
- 1970-1973: Fellow, Tata Institute of Fundamental Research, Bombay
- 1962-1970: Research Associate, Tata Institute of Fundamental Research, Bombay
- 1961-1962: Trainee (Physics), Atomic Energy Establishment School
- 1959-1961: Lecturer in Physics, Union Christian College, Alwaye (Affiliated with the University of Kerala)

=== Special Responsibilities/Assignments (International /National) ===
- 2010-2020: Editor-in-Chief Journal of the Indian Society of Remote Sensing
- 2012: Member Scientific Advisory Committee, Indian Institute of Astrophysics, Bangalore
- 2010: Chairman Review panel of the Tata Institute of Fundamental Research Balloon Facility
- 2010: Member, State Council of Climate Change, Govt of Himachal Pradesh
- 2004–2006: Member, Governing Council, Indian National Centre for Ocean Information Services, Hyderabad
- 2003–2004: Member of the International Academy of Astronautics Study Team on Space to promote peace –initial focus on reconstruction of Afghanistan
- 2002–2004: President, Indian Society of Remote Sensing
- 1999–2001: President, Gujarat Science Academy
- 1999: Consulting Faculty, Taleem Research Foundation, Ahmedabad
- 1997–1998: Member, Steering Committee, Centre for Development of Advanced Computing, Pune
- 1997–2000: Member, Research Council, National Institute of Oceanography
- 1996–2000: President, Technical Commission-I, International Society for Photogrammetry and Remote Sensing
- 1996–1999: President, Indian Society of Geomatics
- 1994–1997: Member, Research Council, Central Glass and Ceramic Research Institute, Calcutta
- 1994–1996: President, Indian Society of Remote Sensing
- 1993–1996: Vice-President, Indian Society of Geomatics
- 1993–1996: Member, Management Council, Vikram Sarabhai Centre for Development Interaction
- 1992–1998: Member, Andhra Pradesh State Remote Sensing Applications Centre Society
- 1989–1998: Member, Governing Body of Centre for Earth Science Studies, Trivandrum
- 1988–1998: Member, Advisory Committee for Remote Sensing Applications Centre, Madhya Pradesh, Bhopal
- 1988–1991: Member-Secretary, Indian National Committee for Space Research
- 1985–1988: Member, Governing Council, Indian Institute of Astrophysics, Bangalore

=== Special Responsibilities/Assignments (Indian Space Research Organization) ===
- 2017–2019: Chairman Advisory Committee on Space Science
- 2010: Member Committee to Review the Chandayaan-2Payload Proposals
- 2005–2017: Vice-chairman, Advisory Committee on Space Science
- 2004–2008: Chairman, Science Advisory Board, Chandrayaan-1
- 2004–2015: Chairman, ASTROSAT Payload Monitoring Committee
- 2009–2018: Chairman, Scientific Advisory Committee, Space Physics Laboratory, Trivandrum
- 2003–2018: Chairman, Scientific Advisory Committee, National Atmospheric Research Laboratory, Tirupati
- 2000–2002: Chairman, Lunar Mission Study Task Force
- 1998–2001: Chairman, Technical Review Committee for Remote Sensing Applications
- 1997–1998: Chairman, Management Council, Remote Sensing Application Missions
- 1995–1998: Member, INSAT Project Management Council
- 1992–1998: Member, Management Council for Laboratory for Electro-Optics Systems
- 1992–1998: Member, Mission Management Council for Integrated Mission for Sustainable Development
- 1989–1998: Member, Project Management Council, Indian Remote Sensing Satellite
- 1988–1997: Alternate Chairman, Management Council, Remote Sensing Application Missions
- 1988–1998: Chairman, Steering Committee for Remote Sensing Applications of Agriculture Mission
- 1987–1990: Director, Indian Remote Sensing Satellite Utilisation Programme
- 1987–1988: Member, Executive Committee, Microwave Remote Sensing Programme
- 1987–1988: Member, Remote Sensing Application Mission Council
- 1984–1992: Associate Project Director, (Very High Resolution Radiometer, Payload), INSAT-II Test Spacecraft Project
- 1980–1988: Associate Project Director (Payloads), Indian Remote Sensing Satellite Project
- 1975–1985: Principal scientistSEO/ Bhaskara TV payload

== Professional bodies ==
- Fellow Indian Academy of Sciences
- Fellow National Academy of Sciences, India
- Fellow Indian National Academy of Engineering
- Fellow Indian Geophysical Union
- Fellow Gujarat Science Academy
- Fellow Indian Meteorological Society
- Fellow Indian Society of Remote Sensing
- Fellow Astronautical Society of India

== Recognition ==
- Padma Bhushan (1999)
- Tata Institute of Fundamental Research Alumni Association Excellence Awards (2009)
- Outstanding Life Time Contribution in Ocean Science and Technology (2009)
- Life Time Achievement Award, Geospatial Technologies (2008)
- Outstanding Achievement Award, Indian Space Research Organization (2008)
- Aryabhata Award, Astronautical Society of India (2007)
- Melpadom Attumalil Georgekutty Merit Award, Mar Thoma church (2006)
- Bhaskara Award : Lifetime Contribution Awarded Instituted by Indian Society of Remote Sensing for outstanding achievement (1997)
- Om Prakash Bhasin Award for Science and Technology in the discipline of Space and Aerospace (1987)
- SICO – National Academy of Sciences Award for Instrumentation (1986)

== Publications ==
- Fundamentals of Remote Sensing, University Press (India), 1st edition, 2003, 2nd edition 2005
- Building Earth Observation Cameras, CRC Press, 2015
- India's Journey Towards Excellence in Building – Earth Observation Cameras, re-published by Notion Press 2016
- Fundamentals of Remote Sensing, (with C. Jeganathan) University Press (India), 3rd edition, 2018

Government offices
Preceded by: PP Kale	*Director SAC (Indian Space Research Organization); *1994–1998	Succeeded by: AKS Gopalan
