= P. K. Rajagopalan =

Indian scientist

- Born: 1930/10/27; Mukteshwar, Kumaon division, Uttarakhand, India
- Died: 29/04/2024; Chennai
- Resting place: Chennai
- Other name: Pylore Krishnaier Rajagopalan
- Occupations: Vector control scientist, acarologist
- Years active: 1952-1990
- Known for: Vector Control programme in India
- Awards: Padma Shri; Om Prakash Bhasin Award

Pylore Krishnaier Rajagopalan was an Indian vector control scientist, biologist and acarologist, known for his pioneering contributions to the control programmes against vector-borne diseases in India. He was a former director of the Indian Council of Medical Research managed Vector Control Research Centre, Pondicherry. He graduated in 1949 from the Banaras Hindu University and obtained a Masters in Zoology with University First Rank there itself in 1951. In 1952 he joined the fledgling Virus Research Centre in Pune, and worked under the supervision of some of the finest vector control specialists such as Dr T Ramachandra Rao. In recognition of his outstanding work as a young research scientist, in 1957 he was awarded a Fellowship by the Rockefeller Foundation to pursue a Master's program in Public Health from the University of California, Berkeley. He went on to secure a Diploma in Acarology from the University of Maryland at College Park.

He returned to India in 1960 and rejoined the Virus Research Centre where he was asked to lead the investigation into the mysterious Kyasanur Forest Disease in rural Karnataka. His pioneering work on the role of migratory birds in spreading disease vectors as part of the investigation into KFD, conducted under the supervision of the ornithologist the late Dr Salim Ali, led to his doctoral degree from Pune University.

He was then assigned as a Senior Scientist to the World Health Organization Project on Genetic Control of Mosquitoes in New Delhi, during which time he expanded the body of knowledge on mosquito population behaviour. In 1975 he was posted to Pondicherry where he founded the Vector Control Research Centre - a research centre set up to study ecological control of vector borne diseases.

The VCRC, under his leadership, contributed significantly to the control of Japanese Encephalitis in Burdwan District. However its flagship achievement under the leadership of Dr Rajagopalan was to pioneer the technique of Biological Control, which combined minimal chemical intervention with environmental measures and the use of natural mosquito larval predators to bring down the incidence of diseases like filariasis. This was demonstrated spectacularly over five years in Pondicherry and Shertallai in Kerala.

After his superannuation in 1990, he served the World Health Organization as a member of their steering committees on Filariasis and on biological control of vectors. He is a fellow of the Royal Society of Tropical Medicine, UK and is credited with several articles on vector control and acarology.

== Scientific Interests ==
Dr Rajagopalan has worked extensively on ecological aspects of vector borne diseases for four decades on a variety of diseases in India. His academic interests are:

- Japanese Encephalitis and its control in several states.
- On ticks and mites, small mammals, birds, and on the Epidemiology of Kyasanur Forest Disease.
- Genetic control of mosquitoes.
- Integrated vector control methods with community participation to control Bancroftian Filariasis in Pondicherry.
- Elimination of Brugian Filariasis in Shertallai.
- Control of Island Malaria in Rameswaram and urban malaria in Salem.
- Malaria control in the coastal villages of Pondicherry and in tribal areas of Orissa.

== Education ==
Dr Rajagopalan has continuously kept himself abreast with the body of knowledge in vector biology. He has received extensive training on arboviruses from 406th SEATO research Centre, Bangkok, at the National Institutes of Health, Tokyo, at the Trinidad Regional Virus Laboratory, Port-of-Spain and at the East African Virus Laboratory in Entebbe in Uganda. He sharpened his knowledge of Malaria vector control at the Malaria Research Institute, Amani in Tanzania and on mosquito taxonomy from P. F. Mattingly at the British Museum (Natural History), London. He had the privilege of learning Ecology under Charles Elton at Bureau of Animal Populations, Oxford, and Acarology under Dr Hoogstraal, US Naval Medical Research Unit in Cairo during his career. He was associated with Dr Jorge Boshell and many others of the Rockefeller Foundation for two decades. In recognition of his body of scientific work, he was honoured with a Padma Shri by President R Venkataraman in 1990.
