= M. G. Deo =

Indian oncologist and pathologist

- Born: 6 April 1932 (age 94); Gwalior, Madhya Pradesh, India
- Other name: Madhav Gajanan Deo
- Occupations: Pathologist; Molecular medicine specialist
- Known for: Molecular medicine research
- Awards: Padma Shri; Amrut Mody Research Foundation Award; Om Prakash Bhasin Award; MCI Research Award; Rameshwardas Birla National Award; AIPNA Life Time Achievement Award; Hari Om Alembic Research Fund Award

Madhav Gajanan Deo (born 6 April 1932) is an Indian oncologist, pathologist and educationist, known for his contributions to the field of Molecular medicine. He is the founder president of the Indian Association of Cancer Research and one of the founders of the Moving Academy of Medicine and Biomedicine. He is a recipient of the Om Prakash Bhasin Award. The Government of India awarded him the fourth highest civilian award of Padma Shri in 1990.

== Biography ==
Madhav Deo was born on 6 April 1932 and graduated in medicine from Gajra Raja Medical College, Gwalior under Agra University in 1955. His master's degree (MD) came from All India Institute of Medical Sciences, Delhi for his research under Vulimiri Ramalingaswami which he completed in his first attempt in May 1960 after which he secured a doctoral degree (PhD) in July 1964 from the same institution. Joining AIIMS, he became a professor of pathology in 1974 and held the post till 1978, when he was appointed as the director of Cancer Research Institute, (present day Advanced Centre for Treatment, Research and Education in Cancer - ACTREC, a satellite institution of the Tata Memorial Centre). He stayed at the centre till 1975, and after a short stint at Jaslok Hospital as the director of Research and Chief of Laboratories (1997–1998), he shifted his base to Mauritius as the director of SSR Centre for Medical Studies and Research, University of Mauritius where he worked for two years, till his retirement in 2000. He also served as a Fogarty Scholar in Residence at John E. Fogarty International Center of the National Institute of Health, Bethesda, USA and as a visiting professor at the University of Paris VII.

== Legacy ==
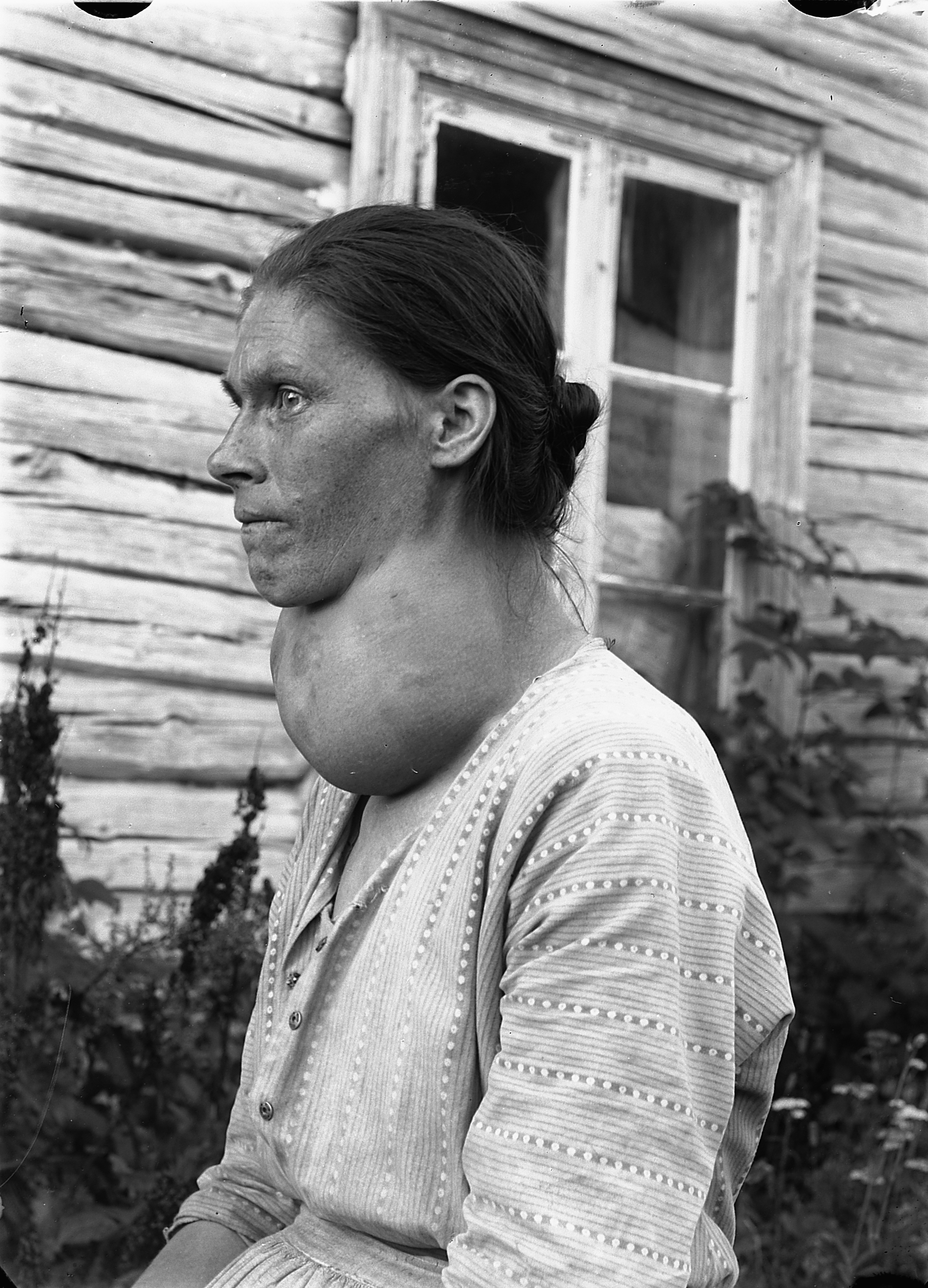
Goitre (Struma Class III)

During his masters and doctoral research at the All India Institute of Medical Sciences, along with V. Ramalingaswami, Deo was able to develop a non-human primate model of human protein energy malnutrition. Together, they propounded the necessity of iodization of common salt, which formed the base for the National Goitre Control Programme in India. He is credited with the development of an anti-leprosy vaccine from killed ICRC bacillus which was accomplished during his stint at the Cancer Research Institute. Continuing his research at the institute, Deo and his colleagues, discovered an Enhancing Factor (EF), a 14 kDa protein, isolated from the small intestine of mice. This gene is presently in use for producing transgenic mice. His researches have been documented by way of several articles, published in peer-reviewed journals and papers presented at national and international conferences.

In 1980, Deo and a few other oncological researchers and medical practitioners, got together for the promotion of cancer research and interaction among scientific community and to disseminate knowledge about the disease among the common man and that resulted in the formation of the Indian Association of Cancer Research with Deo as its founder president. He was among the twelve medical researchers who assisted Noshir Hormusjee Wadia in founding the Moving Academy of Medicine and Biomedicine, in 2001, to spread the knowledge about the modern trends in medical and bio-medical research, of which he is the incumbent vice president. The organization plays a role in conducting periodical workshops at institutions, thereby providing easy access for the medical student community to modern medical information; the First National Medical Students' Research Conference was conducted in 2006 at Pune, which was open to medical graduate students. The next one, the First Asian and Second National Medical Students' Research Conference was staged two years.after which, the students, under Deo's leadership, formed an association, the Indian Forum For Medical Students' Research (INFORMER). The forum promotes research based education and assists members to secure funds for education and research. He serves as the member of the editorial board of The Journal of Krishna Institute of Medical Sciences University and has served as an advisor to many national and international medical organizations such as Pravara Institute of Medical Sciences, where he serves as a member of their expert panel. He also worked as an honorary visiting professor at the School of Health Sciences of the University of Pune and was a member of the Scientific Advisory Committee of the National AIDS Research Institute.

== Awards and honours ==
M. G. Deo is an elected fellow of the Indian National Science Academy (1974), served its council as a member from 1977 to 1980 and was its secretary from 1978 to 1982. Two years later, the Indian Academy of Sciences elected him as their fellow in 1976., The National Academy of Sciences, India, another elite Indian science academy, elected him as a fellow in 1991. He has also been a Rockefeller Foundation fellow and is a fellow of the National Academy of Medical Sciences which has honoured him by selecting him as its lifetime Emeritus Professor.

Deo has delivered several notable award lectures such as the Bires Chandra Guha Lecture of Indian National Science Academy (1978), Basanti Devi Amir Chand Oration of Indian Council of Medical Research (1980), Silver Jubilee Oration of the All India Institute of Medical Sciences Delhi, Platinum Jubilee Lecture Award of Indian Science Congress Association (1988) and Vikram Sarabhai Oration. He received the Amrut Mody Research Foundation Award in 1972 and the Om Prakash Bhasin Award in 1988. The next year, the Medical Council of India awarded him the Silver Jubilee Research Award (1989). The Government of India included him in the 1990 Republic Day honours for the civilian award of Padma Shri. Two years later, he received the Rameshwar Das Birla National Award (1992) and Jawaharlal Nehru Birth Centenary Visiting Fellowship Award of Indian National Science Academy reached him 1993. He is also a recipient of the Hari Om Alembic Research Fund Award and the Association of Pathologist of Indian of North America, USA selected him for the Life Time Achievement Award in 2008.

== Selected bibliography ==
- Mulherkar R, Rao R, Rao L, Patki V, Chauhan VS, Deo MG (February 1993). "Enhancing factor protein from mouse small intestines belongs to the phospholipase A2 family". FEBS Lett. 317 (3): 263–66. doi:10.1016/0014-5793(93)81289-c. PMID 8425615. S2CID 9947061.
- G. J. Jha; M. G. Deo & V. Ramalingaswami (December 1968). "Bone growth in protein deficiency. A study in rhesus monkeys". Am J Pathol. 53 (6): 1111–1123. PMC 2013535. PMID 4972502.
- Deo MG, Sood SK, Ramalingaswami V (1965). "Experimental Protein Deficiency". Arch. Pathol. 80: 14–23.
- V. Ramalingaswami; T. A. V. Subramanian; M. G. Deo; M. B. Agra (April 1961). "The Aetiology of Himalayan Endemic Goitre". The Lancet. 277 (7181): 791–794. doi:10.1016/S0140-6736(61)90118-0. PMID 13739307.
- Sooch SS, Deo MG, Karmarkar MG, Kochupillai N, Ramachandran K, Ramalingaswami V (1973). "Prevention of endemic goitre with iodized salt". Bull World Health Organ. 49 (3): 307–312. PMC 2481146. PMID 4546523.
- M. G. Deo (April 1989). "ICRC 'anti-leprosy vaccine'". Vaccine. 7 (2): 92–93. doi:10.1016/0264-410x(89)90041-8. PMID 2665352.
- Deo MG, Bapat CV, Chullawalla RG, Bhatki WS (August 1981). "Potential anti-leprosy vaccine from killed ICRC bacilli--a clinicopathological study". Indian J Med Res. 74: 164–177. PMID 7030942.
- Mulherkar R1, Desai SJ, Rao RS, Wagle AS, Deo MG. (1991). "Expression of enhancing factor gene and its localization in mouse tissues". Histochemistry. 96 (4): 367–370. doi:10.1007/bf00271358. PMID 1787109. S2CID 38630308.
- Mulherkar R, Rao R, Rao L, Patki V, Chauhan VS, Deo MG (February 1993). "Enhancing factor protein from mouse small intestines belongs to the phospholipase A2 family". FEBS Lett. 317 (3): 263–66. doi:10.1016/0014-5793(93)81289-c. PMID 8425615. S2CID 9947061.

== See also ==
- Vulimiri Ramalingaswami
- Genetically modified mouse
- N. H. Wadia
- Molecular medicine
