= Anirban Pathak =

Indian physicist

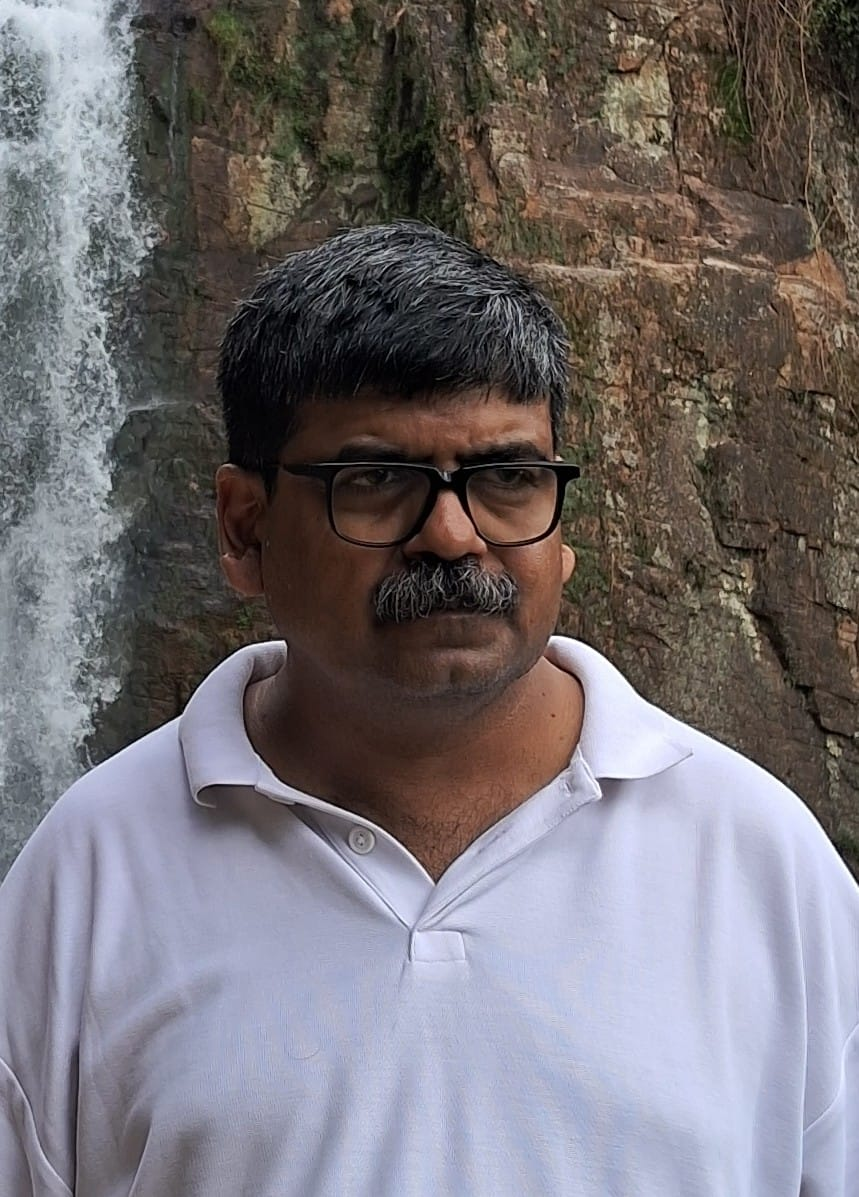
- Prof. Anirban Pathak
- Born: Malda, West Bengal, India
- Education: Visva-Bharati University
- Known for: Quantum optics, Quantum information theory, Quantum cryptography
- Awards: Om Prakash Bhasin Award (2017); Fellow, The National Academy of Sciences, India; Fellow, Optical Society of India; Fellow, Institution of Electronics and Telecommunication Engineers
- Scientific career
- Fields: Physics
- Workplaces: Jaypee Institute of Information Technology
- Website: www.jiit.ac.in/prof-anirban-pathak

Anirban Pathak is an Indian physicist, professor, and the Head of the Department of Physics and Materials Science & Engineering at the Jaypee Institute of Information Technology (JIIT), Noida. He has worked in quantum optics, quantum information, and quantum cryptography. He is a fellow of The National Academy of Sciences, India (NASI), the Optical Society of India (OSI), and the Institution of Electronics and Telecommunication Engineers (IETE). He is also the 2017 recipient of the Om Prakash Bhasin Award in the field of Electronics & Information Technology.

== Education ==
Anirban Pathak received his Ph.D. in Physics from Visva-Bharati University, Santiniketan. Following his doctoral studies, he was a post-doctoral research fellow at the Free University of Berlin, Germany.

== Career ==
He joined the Jaypee Institute of Information Technology, Noida, in 2002. He is currently a professor and the Head of the Department of Physics and Materials Science & Engineering. He also heads the Centre for Quantum Science and Technology at JIIT.

== Research ==
His research focuses on quantum optics, quantum information theory, quantum cryptography, and the applications of non-classical light. He has published over 170 research papers in peer-reviewed journals and has an h-index of 38 as of August 2024.

=== Books ===
Author:

- Pathak, Anirban (2013). Elements of Quantum Computation and Quantum Communication. CRC Press, Taylor & Francis Group. ISBN 978-1-4665-1791-2.
- Pathak, Anirban (2016). Optical Quantum Information and Quantum Communication. Society of Photo-Optical Instrumentation Engineers. ISBN 978-1-5106-0220-5.

Editor:

- Pathak, Anirban; Roy, Supriya; Pan, Alok Kumar; Sen, Bikash, eds. (2021). Lectures on Quantum Mechanics: Fundamentals and Applications. Viva Books. ISBN 9788130929958.
- Basu, Bikash; Pathak, Anirban; Al-Hashimi, Mohammed; Majumdar, A. S., eds. (2020). Meghnad Saha: A Great Scientist and a Visionary (PDF). Viva Books. ISBN 978-93-89401-71-4.
- Pathak, Anirban, ed. (2019). Light and its Many Wonders. Viva Books. ISBN 9788130934556.

=== Academic community involvement ===
He serves as an Associate Editor for the journal Quantum Information Processing (Springer Nature). He is also on the editorial board of Quantum Review Letters (KeAi Publishing).

In a 2020 interview with Mint, he commented on the state of quantum research in India, highlighting the need for increased investment and focus to compete globally in the field.

== Awards ==
- Shri Om Prakash Bhasin Award for Science and Technology in the field of Electronics & Information Technology (2017)
- Fellow, The National Academy of Sciences, India (NASI) (2017)
- Fellow, Optical Society of India (OSI)
- Fellow, Institution of Electronics and Telecommunication Engineers (IETE)
