= Indira Nath =

Indian immunologist (1938–2021)

- Born: 14 January 1938
- Died: 24 October 2021 (aged 83); New Delhi, India
- Citizenship: India
- Education: AIIMS, Delhi
- Known for: Immunology research, Leprosy eradication in India
- Awards: Padma Shri, L'Oreal-UNESCO award for Women in Science Shanti Swarup Bhatnagar Award
- Scientific career
- Fields: Immunology
- Workplaces: All India Institute of Medical Sciences, National Academy of Sciences, India

Indira Nath (14 January 1938 – 24 October 2021) was an Indian immunologist. Her major contribution in medical science deals with mechanisms underlying immune unresponsiveness in man, reactions and nerve damage in leprosy and a search for markers for viability of the Leprosy bacillus. Prof. Nath's fields of specialisations are Immunology, Pathology, Medical biotechnology, and communicable diseases.

== Career ==
Nath received her MBBS from All India Institute of Medical Sciences (AIIMS), New Delhi. She joined AIIMS as MD (pathology) after mandatory hospital training in the UK. During the 1970s, India has the world's largest number of leprosy patients of 4.5 million.

In 1970, Nath was in the UK with a Nuffield Fellowship. During this period, she came to specialise in immunology. She worked in the area of infectious diseases, particularly leprosy, with Professor John Turk at the Royal College of Surgeons and Dr. RJW Rees at the National Institute for Medical Research, London.

She saw the importance of getting experience abroad but did not want to add to the brain drain out of India. She and her husband made a pact to return to India after 3 years abroad. She returned to India in the early 1970s.

“Still, it was quite an exciting time to come back because you felt you could really play a role in building up research,” she said in an interview published on Nature Medicine in 2002.

After coming back to India, she joined Professor Gursaran Talwar's Department of Biochemistry at AIIMS, which had just initiated immunology research in India. Later in 1980 she moved to the Department of Pathology and she founded and established Department Biotechnology (1986) at AIIMS. She retired in 1998 but continued to work at AIIMS as INSA-SN Bose Research Professor.

She was one of 100 scientists gathered by Rajiv Gandhi when he became Prime Minister to make suggestions to improve Indian science.

She received DSc from Pierre and Marie Curie University, Paris in 2002. She was invited for the post of Dean of AIMST University in Malaysia and also as Director of Blue Peter Research Centre (Lepra Research Centre), Hyderabad.

== Research ==
Her research is focused on the cellular immune responses in human leprosy as well as nerve damage in the disease. Her work has also looked for indicators of the leprosy bacillus surviving. She has over 120 publications, invited reviews, opinion/comments on recent developments in international journals. Her discovery and her pioneering work are a significant step towards the development of treatment and vaccines for leprosy.

== On Leprosy ==
In a televised interview in the programme Eureka by India's state TV Doordashan, Indira said that the stigma around leprosy never affected her. She also mentions that the leprosy bug doesn't kill, calling it a clever bug that just wants to survive peacefully in the body. "So we should look at it kindly." She said: "Leprosy is in fact not infectious at all. In fact, cold, flu etc are much more infectious. The leprosy bug grows very slowly and it doesn't enter very quickly. The incubation period takes years." It is the nerve damage and the deformities you see on the body frightens patients, she adds.

Thanks to World Health Organization (WHO)'s introduction of Multi Drug Therapy introduced in India in 1982, the disease incidence in the country saw a reduction from a prevalence rate of 57.8/10,000 in 1983 to less than 1/10,000 by the end of 2005 when India declared to have reached the WHO target of elimination as a public health problem. Contributions of scientists like Indira have been instrumental in this progress.

== Awards ==
Year of award or honour	Name of award or honour	Awarding organisation
2003	Silver Banner	Tuscany, Italy
2003	Chevalier Ordre National du Merite	Government of France
2002	Women in Science (Asia Pacific)award	L'Oreal UNESCO
1999	Padmashri	Government of India
1995	RD Birla Award	
1995	Cochrane Research Award	UK Government
1994	Basanti Devi Amir Chand Award	ICMR
1990	Om Prakash Bhasin Award	
1988	Clayton Memorial Lecture Award	
1987	1st Nitya Anand Endowment Lecture Award	INSA
1984	Kshanika Award	ICMR
1983	Shanti Swaroop Bhatnagar Award	Government of India
1981	JALMA Trust Oration	ICMR

== Honours ==
She was elected Fellow of the National Academy of Sciences, India, Allahabad (1988), Indian Academy of Sciences, Bangalore (1990), Indian National Science Academy (INSA; 1992), National Academy of Medical Sciences (India) (1992), Royal College of Pathology (1992) and the Academy of Sciences for the Developing World (TWAS) (1995). She was Member, Scientific Advisory Committee to Cabinet, Foreign Secretary INSA (1995–97), Council Member (1992–94, 1998–2006) and Vice President (2001–03) of the National Academy of Sciences (India), Allahabad, and chairperson, Women Scientists Programme, Department of Science and technology, India (2003).

She was awarded the Padma Shri by Government of India in 1999, and L'Oréal-UNESCO Awards for Women in Science in 2002 and several other awards (see table above).

== See also ==
- Timeline of women in science
