= K. N. Shankara =

Indian scientist (1945–2017)

- Dr. Koodli Nanjunda Ghanapathi Shankar
- Born: 7 May 1945
- Died: 17 July 2017; Bangalore
- Education: Ph.D. (Electrical Communication Engineering), Indian Institute of Science, Bangalore
- Known for: Indian Space Program
- Awards: Padma Shri (2004)
- Scientific career
- Fields: Electrical and Electronics Engineering and Satellite Technology
- Workplaces: Indian Space Research Organisation

Koodli Nanjunda Ghanapathi Shankara was a space scientist from India. He was the Director of ISRO's Space Applications Centre (SAC), Ahmedabad and ISRO Satellite Centre (ISAC), Bangalore. He was the Director of Satellite Communications Program Office and Program Director, INSAT, and was looking after overall planning and direction of communication satellite program. His work in the field of transponder design and development led to a boost in India's communication satellite technology.

For his contribution in the field of satellite technology, Shankara was awarded the Padma Shri by the government of India in 2004. He is said to be the person who conceptualized Chandrayaan, India's first venture to Moon.

== Early life ==
Shankara was born on 7 May 1945. He did his post-graduation in Physics and received his Doctorate in Electrical Communication Engineering from Indian Institute of Science at Bangalore in 1972. He died on 17 July 2017, at the age of 72.

== Career ==
Shankara joined Space Application Centre, Ahmedabad in 1971 to work on the design and development of communication payloads. As Associate Project Director of INSAT- 2A and INSAT - 2B, he was responsible for the development transponders for these satellites. As Group Director at SAC until 1996, he contributed extensively to organise the work in the area of microwave technology and spacecraft electronics.

He has also served as Honorary Professor at the Gujarat University and has large number of publications in national and international journals.

Shankara moved to ISRO Satellite Centre, Bangalore in 1996 as deputy director, Electronics Systems Area, to direct technical activities on spacecraft electronics like, spacecraft power systems, telemetry, telecommand and data handling, communication systems, assembly, integration and checkout of spacecraft. In 2001, he took over as Director, Satellite Communications Programme and Programme Director, INSAT at ISRO Headquarters, Bangalore, in which capacity, he was involved in the overall planning and direction of the communication satellite programme of ISRO.

In 2002, he became the Director of Space Applications Centre (SAC), Ahmedabad and remained at that post till 2005. He then became the Director of ISRO Satellite Centre (ISAC) and remained at the post since May 2008.

== Awards ==
Shankara received the IETE-IRS (83) award for 1995-96 and was also awarded “Om Prakash Bhasin” award for “Space and Aerospace” for 1998 and “Ramlal Wadwa Gold Medal” for “Outstanding contribution in Electronics” during 2000 by the IETE. He received Astronautical Society of India award for “Space System Management” in 2000 and “VASVIK award” in 2001 for contribution in “Electrical & Electronics and Science & Technology”. He was also awarded Appreciation Award from National Biomedical Engineering Society of India.

In 2004 he was awarded Padma Shri for his contribution in the field of Space Technology.
