= Aditya Narayan Purohit =

Indian scientist and professor (born 1940)

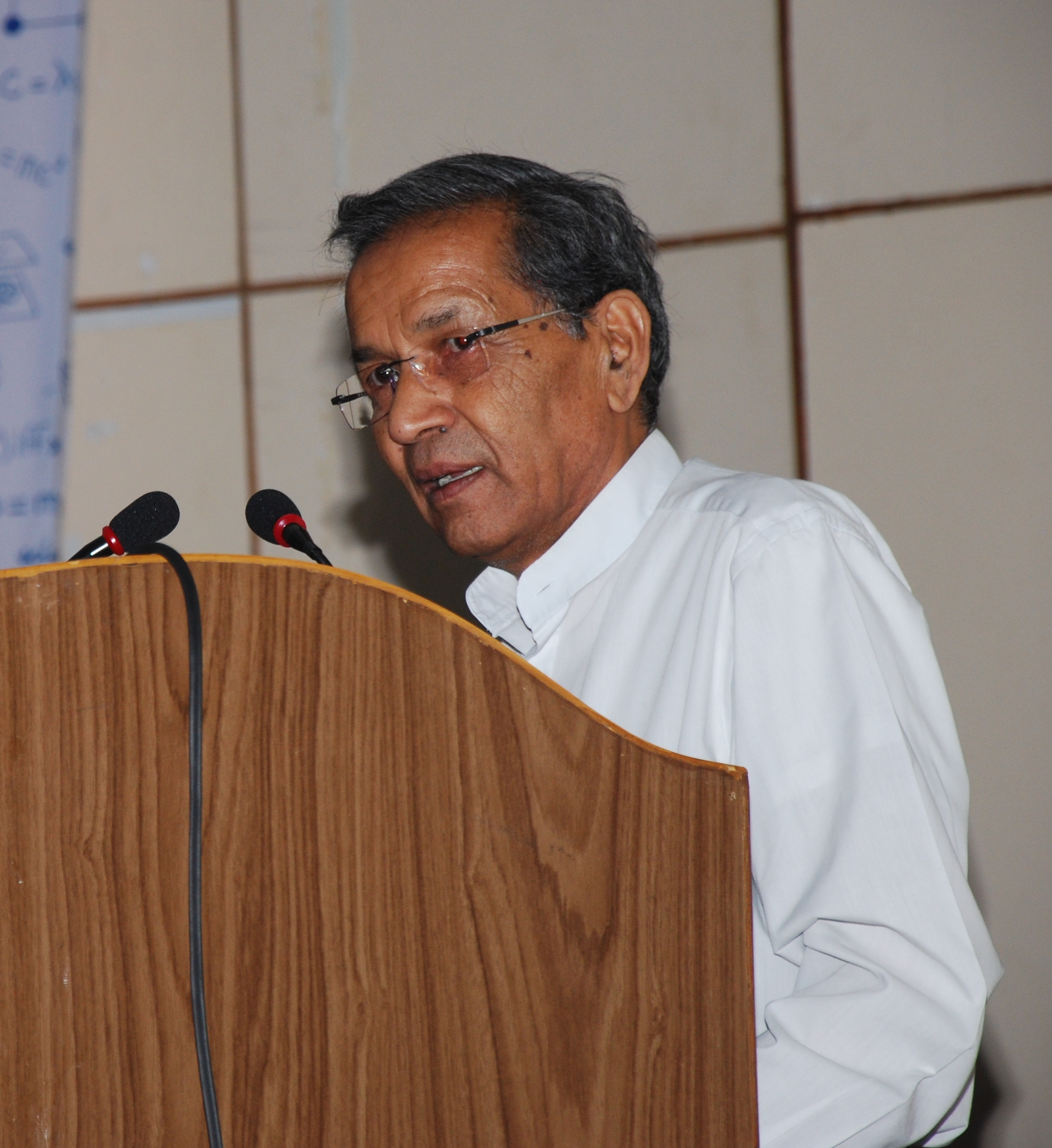
- Purohit addressing research community
- Born: 30 July 1940 (age 86); Kimni, Tharali, Chamoli, Uttarakhand, India
- Title: Professor
- Awards: Padma Shri
- Scientific career
- Fields: Ecophysiology of tree species and Physiology of high altitude medicinal plants

Aditya Narayan Purohit (born 30 July 1940) is an Indian scientist and professor who has mainly worked on ecophysiology of tree species and physiology of high altitude medicinal plants. He was the Vice-Chancellor of Hemwati Nandan Bahuguna Garhwal University and director of the university's High Altitude Plant Physiology Research Center. He was also the Director of Govind Ballabh Pant Institute of Himalayan Environment and Development from 1990 to 1995.

Purohit was awarded Padma Shri, the fourth highest civilian award of India, by the President of India in 1997 for his valuable scientific contribution in Indian mountains.

== Personal life ==
Purohit was born in Kimni, Chamoli district, Uttarakhand, India. He had his early education in Tharali and Rudraprayag in Chamoli district, Lansdowne in Pauri district, Nainital and research studies in Panjab University Chandigarh.

He worked at Forest Research Institute Dehradun, Panjab University Chandigarh, Central Potato Research Institute, Shimla, the University of British Columbia and North Eastern Hill University, Shillong before joining H.N.B. Garhwal University in 1977. He has travelled all over the world to deliver lecturers and seminars in various conferences. He is married to Malti Purohit; they have a daughter and a son.

After joining HNB Garhwal University, Purohit initiated work on high-altitude plants. He established an institute with its alpine field station at 13000-ft elevation at Tungnath, which is the first Alpine Center in India. The work conducted at this centre has revealed that high altitude species are less sensitive than the low altitude species to the environmental stresses. The germination studies of alpine plants made by Purohit and his associates have helped in germinating many endangered species and establishing them in nature in the alpine field station at Tungnath. He and his associates have come up with the cultivation technology for Aconites, alpine and sub-alpine plants of very high medicinal value, where yield is increased 10 to 12 fold. He has made valuable scientific contribution on mountain plants and the mountain ecosystem. After retiring from H.N.B. Garhwal University in 2002, he was offered the special chair by Government of Uttarakhand to advice on conservation, development and cultivation of medicinal and aromatic plants in the State. He has established a Centre for Aromatic Plants for the State.

== Books edited ==
- Views on Physiology of Flowering, 1978 (with R. Gurumurti)
- Conservation and Management of Biological Resources in Himalaya, 1996 (with P.S. Ramakrishnan, K.G. Saxena, K.S. Rao and R.K. Maikhuri)
- Harvesting the Herbs -2000, 1997 (with A.R. Nautiyal and M.C. Nautiyal)
