= C. G. Krishnadas Nair =

Indian technocrat and scientist

- Born: 17 September 1941 (age 85); Kerala, India
- Occupations: Metallurgist, Technocrat
- Awards: Padmashri; Scope Award; Vaswik Research Award; Birla Gold Medal; National Aeronautical Prize; Dr Ambedkar Bharat Shree Award; Rashtriya Ratna Award; National Metallurgist Award; Omprakash Bhasin Award; IIM Platinum Award; Swadeshi Science Puraskara; Enterprise Excellence Award; Gold Cross Award; FIE Foundation Award

Chandrathil Gouri Krishnadas Nair is an Indian technocrat, teacher and metallurgical scientist known for his contributions in the field of aeronautical metallurgy. Dr Nair was given the Padma Shri Award by the Government of India for his contributions to science and technology in 2001.

== Early years ==
C. G. Krishnadas Nair was born in kuttipuzha village in Ernakulam district of Kerala on 17 August 1941 as the son of Idaprampalli Manakkal Krishnan Namboothiri and Chandrathil Gouriamma. Krishnadas Nair got his family name, Chandrathil, through matrilineal succession.

In this Indian name, the name Chandrathil Gouri is a matronymic, and the person should be referred to by the given name, Krishnadas Nair.

Sarvadikaryakkar Kunjikutti Pillai is his maternal ancestor. He had his early education in Kerala and continued his studies at IIT Madras to pass graduate degree in Metallurgical Engineering in 1964. He obtained master's degree in Mechanical Engineering in 1966 and earned PhD in 1968 from the University of Saskatchewan, Canada.

== Career ==
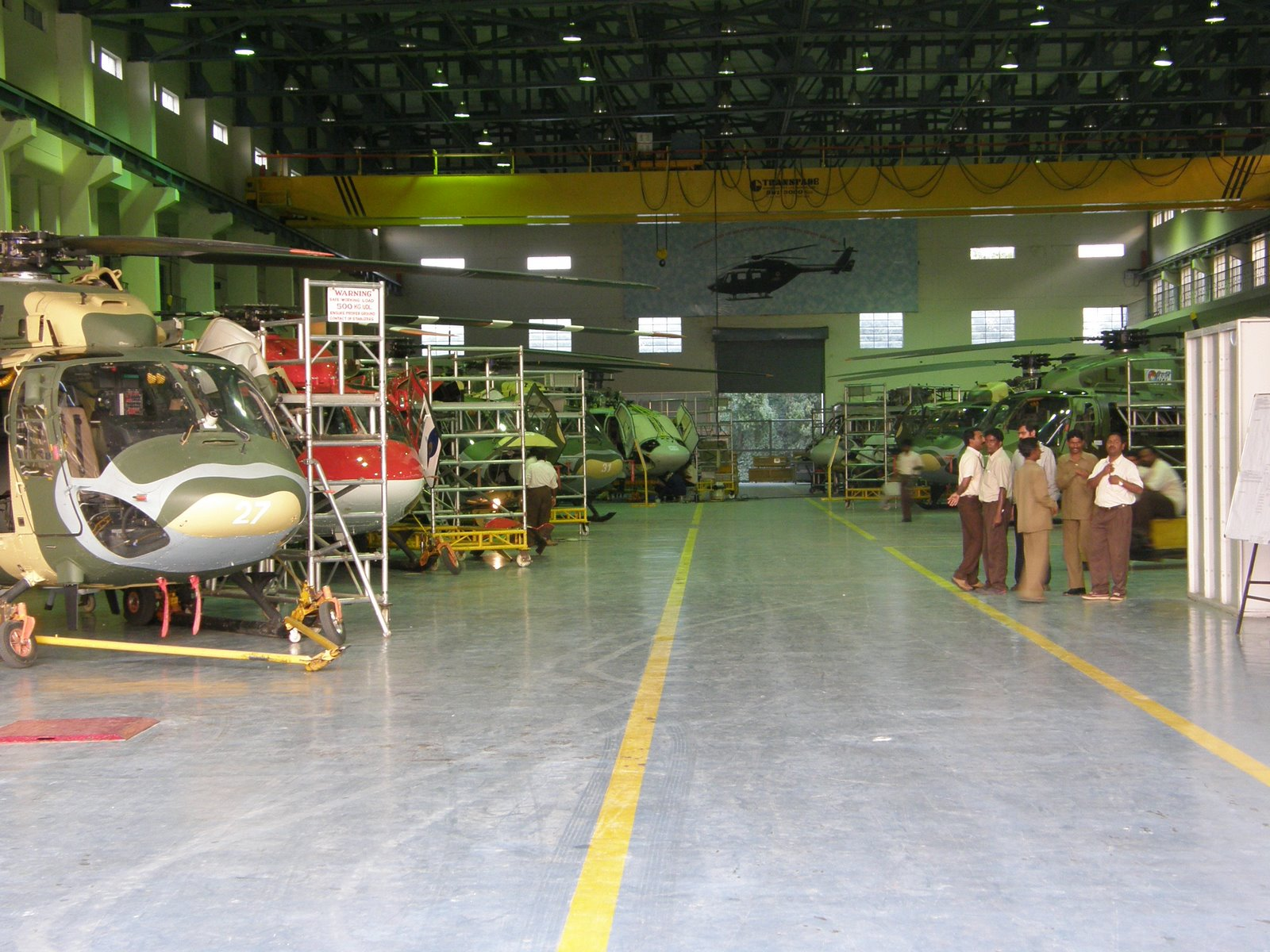
Production line of the HAL Dhruv at Bangalore

C. G. K. Nair started his career as an assistant professor in Regional Engineering College, Suratkal (present KNIT). Later, he worked as visiting faculty at University of Sheffield, UK when he quit teaching career to join Hindustan Aeronautics in the design and development department in 1971. Slowly he rose through the ranks to become the first professional engineer to become MD & Chairman of Hindustan Aeronautics Limited. Nair's efforts at HAL is said to have transformed the company into a globally competent aerospace industry through long-term strategic plan with strong R&D, diversification, export, industry academy interaction and work culture based on ethics and teamwork.

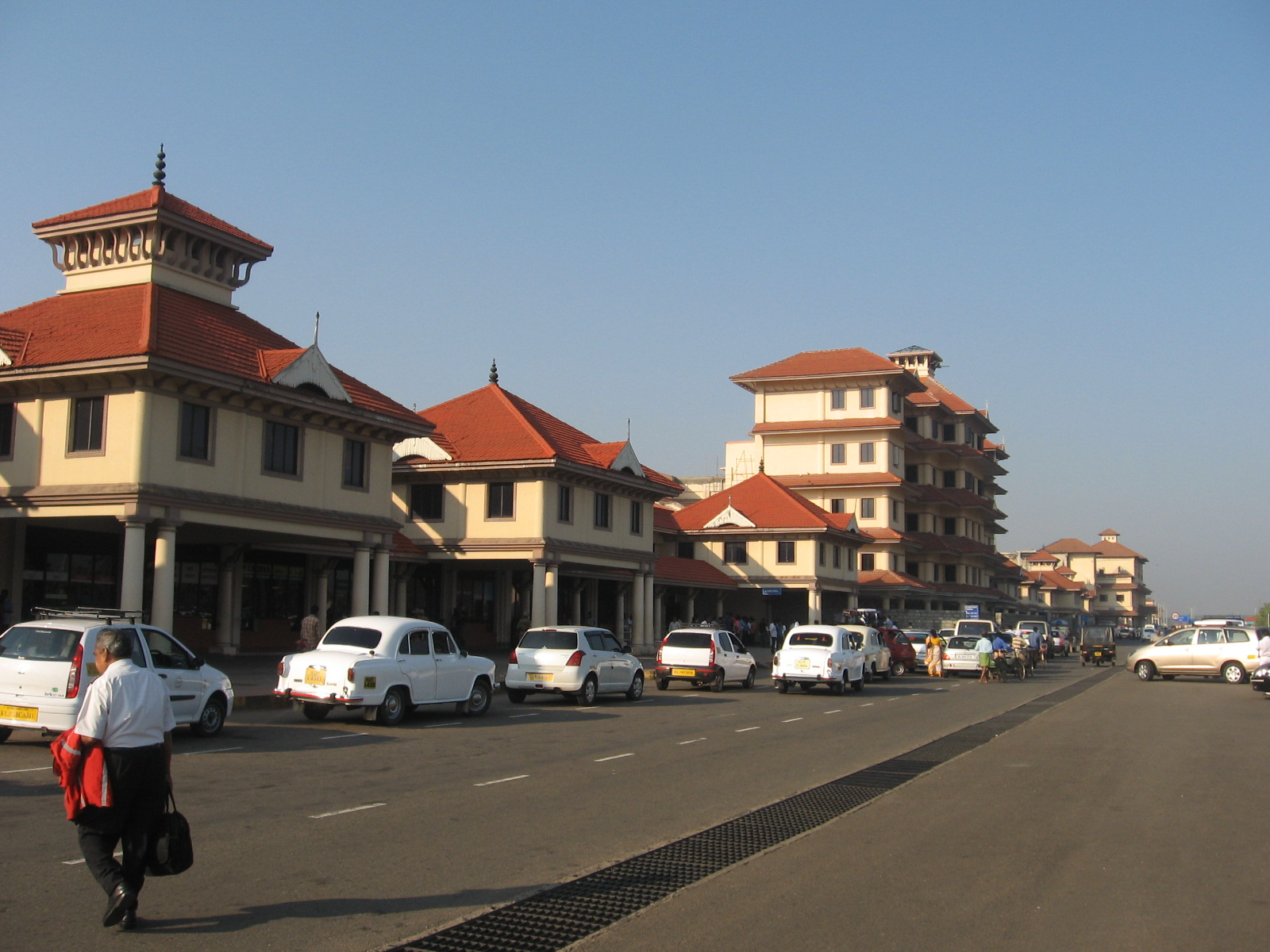

Nair is also credited with efforts that led to the design and development of Advanced Light Helicopter, new Jet trainer and Light Armed Helicopter by HAL. He is considered as the influence behind the design of High Altitude Helicopter, Multi Role Transport Aircraft and many advanced aerospace equipments. In 1991, he founded the Society of Indian Aerospace Technologies and Industries (SIATI) to train and support small and medium enterprises to develop aerospace components indigenously. He served as AICTE-INAE Distinguished Visiting Professor at IIT Chennai for two terms after his retirement from HAL when he was appointed as the Vice Chancellor of MATS University. In 2008, he was invited by Government of Kerala to head Cochin International Airport Limited as the Managing Director. He served CIAL till 2011.

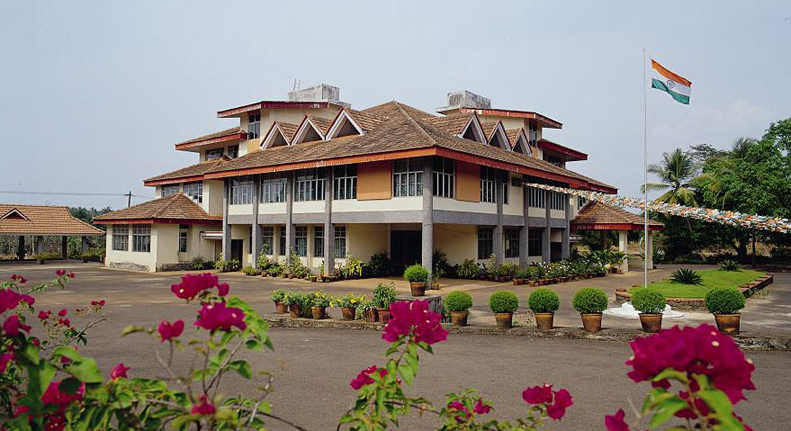
The Administrative Block NITC

C. G. K. Nair has presented and published 193 scientific papers at various conferences at national and international levels. He has authored 20 books. He is the Chairperson of National Institute of Technology Calicut (NITC) since the end of his tenure at CIAL in 2011 and is also an independent Director at Global Vectra Helicorp.

== Positions held ==
C. G. K. Nair has held various positions in his career.

- Chancellor of Jain University, Bangalore - India (Current)
- Chairman and Chief Executive Officer of Hindustan Aeronautics Limited.
- Independent Director at Global Vectra Helicorp Limited since 4 May 2012
- Non-Executive Independent Director at Titan Industries Limited since 2 May 2002
- Member - Scientific Advisory Committee to the Cabinet of India
- Member - Enterprise Reform Committee to the Government of Kerala
- Chairman of the Society of Defence Technologists (SODET)
- President of the Society of Indian Aerospace Technologies
- Member of Governing Council of MVJ College of Engineering
- President of Aeronautical Society of India
- President of Indian Institute of Metals
- Vice-Chancellor of MATS University
- Managing Director, Cochin International Airport Limited
- Founder of International Institute for Aerospace Engineering & Management (IIAEM), Bangalore
- Chairman of National Institute of Technology Calicut

== Awards and recognition ==
Nair received several awards and recognition during his career.

- Outstanding Aerospace Personality Award (2011) for the decade by Indian Aviation for outstanding contributions to the Indian Aerospace Industry
- Centenary of Aviation Award (2010) by Society of Aerospace Studies
- Rajiv Gandhi 60th Birth Anniversary Rastriya Ekta Samman (2008) for contribution to National prosperity, unity and achievements.
- Life Time Contributions and Achievement Award (2007) from Indian National Academy of Engineering (INAE)
- IIM Platinum Award from Indian Institute of Metals (2004)
- National Metallurgist Award (2003) from the Indian Institute of Metals and Ministry of Steel and Mines
- Scope Award for Excellence in Public Sector Management for best Managed Public Sector (HAL) (2003)
- Scope Award for Best Chief Executive and PM's Gold Plaque (2002) Department of Public Enterprises and Ministry of Industries by Vice-President of India
- Padmashri (2001) by the President of India
- Dr.Ambedkar Bharath Shree Award (2001) by Governor of Karnataka
- Gold Cross Award (International) (2001) by COMITE D’HONNEUR du MERITE ET DEVOUEMENT FRANCAIS, France.
- Rashtriya Ratna Award (2001) International Friendship Forum of India
- Swadeshi Science Puraskara (2000)
- National Award for R&D (1998)
- Hon. Fellow & Life Time Achievement Award from Aeronautical Society of India (1997)
- First Distinguished IIT Alumnus Award from IIT: Chennai (1996)
- Omprakash Bhasin Award in Space & Aerospace Application (1996)
- Hindustan Zinc Gold Medal (1993) by Indian Institute of Metals.
- Vasvik Research Award (1992) by Vibidhlaxi Audyogik Samshodhan Vikas Kendra
- FIE Foundation Award (1991) from FIE Foundation, awarded by the Prime Minister of India
- National Award for R&D (1991) by Department of Scientific & Industrial Research
- Indira Gandhi Memorial National Award (1990) for Excellent Chief Executive, by Central Public Sector Employees Federation, Hyderabad
- National Award for Best Employer of Physically Handicapped (1990) by President of India.
- National Energy Award (1990) by the Institute of Indian Foundry men
- National Aeronautical Prize (1990) from Aeronautical Society of India
- National Award for Best Employer of Physically Handicapped (1989) by President of India
- Birla Gold Medal (1988) from Indian Institute of Metals
- Ferroguard Award (1979) from Electro-Chemical Society of India
- Best Young Metallurgist Award (1975) from Ministry of Steel & Mines, Government of India.
- Fellow of Indian Institute of Metals
- Fellow of Institution of Engineers (India)
- Fellow of Indian National Academy of Engineering
