= VASVIK Industrial Research Award =

- Awarded for: Research in science in India
- Location: Patel Vanika, Mumbai, India
- Presented by: Vividhlaxi Audyogik Samshodhan Vikas Kendra
- First award: 1976
- Website: VASVIK Award website

VASVIK Industrial Research Award is an Indian award, instituted to recognize and promote excellence in industrial research in the areas of science and technology. The award is given annually to individuals or groups and carries a citation and a cash prize of ₹ 100,000.

== Profile ==
VASVIK awards have been instituted by Vividhlaxi Audyogik Samshodhan Vikas Kendra (VASVIK), a non profit making non governmental organization established in 1974 by the Mumbai-based business family of Patels, headed by Mohan Patel, an ex Sheriff of Mumbai, who is credited with the development of the first ophthalmic nozzle pure aluminum tube. The awards are annual in cycle and have been instituted with a view to promote industry based research in India in the fields of science and technology. Nine categories have been identified for the awards and individuals and groups are eligible for the awards, except one, which is reserved for women scientists. The awardees are selected by a Board of Advisors nominated by the organization. The awards honour innovation in design and production techniques which foster economic growth of the country by way of import substitution, reduction of manufacturing costs and foreign exchange saving.

== Categories ==
The awards are distributed in nine categories of which 8 are open categories and Chandaben Mohanbhai Patel Industrial Research Award is extended to women scientists only.

- Agricultural Sciences and Technology
- Biological Sciences and Technology
- Chemical Sciences and Technology
- Electrical and Electronic Sciences and Technology
- Environmental Sciences and Technology
- Mechanical and Structural Sciences and Technology
- Information and Communication Technology
- Materials Sciences and Technology
- Chandaben Mohanbhai Patel Industrial Research Award for Women Scientists

== See also ==
- List of physics awards
