= Indian Society for Parasitology =

- Formation: 1973
- Type: Registered Society
- Legal status: Tax exempted
- Purpose: For exchange of information on Parasitology
- Headquarters: Central Drug Research Institute Campus, Lucknow
- Location: Lucknow
- Coordinates: 26.8602°N 80.9309°E
- Region served: Uttar Pradesh, India
- Fields: Parasitology
- Members: 1000
- President: Dr. A.M Khan
- Secretary: Dr. Satish Mishra
- Parent organization: Central Drug Research Institute
- Affiliations: World Federation of Parasitologists
- Website: Official website

Indian Society for Parasitology is a non profit making registered society formed under the aegis of the Central Drug Research Institute, Lucknow, working as a platform for the parasitologists in India for dissemination of knowledge and exchange of research information. The society is affiliated to the World Federation of Parasitologists.

== Profile ==
Indian Society for Parasitology was established as a registered society under the Indian Societies Act in 1973. The organization serves as a platform for the parasitologists, researchers, biologists and academicians involved in the field of Parasitology related to humans and animals for promoting their activities, exchanging information and disseminating knowledge on the subject. The society has 1000 life members and several Fellows honored under its Fellowship program. It is located in the CDRI campus in Lucknow, in the Indian state of Uttar Pradesh.

The society is run by an elected committee and is headed by a president and a secretary; Dr. A.M Khan and Dr. Satish Mishra being the incumbent office bearers. They organize annual conferences where keynote addresses, award lectures, presentation of research papers, guest lectures and symposia are featured. Workshops and training sessions are also organized regularly for the benefit of young scientists working in Parasitology. The society was the host of the second Global Meet on Parasitology, held at Hyderabad in 1997.

ISP has instituted two oration awards, B. N. Singh Memorial Oration and B. P. Pandey Memorial Oration for honoring excellence in research and teaching respectively. It has also put in place annual awards such as Young Scientist Award and M. B. Mirza Award for excellence in research paper presentation and publication.

The society, besides a quarterly newsletter, publishes a bi-annual journal, Journal of Parasitic Diseases (JPD), the services of which are offered to scientists for publishing their research papers.

- Indian Society for Parasitology. "Journal of parasitic diseases". J Parasit Dis. ISSN 0971-7196.

== Fellows of the institute ==
List of Fellows of the institute updated to 2010

Year	Name	Institute	Place
1981	B. P. Pandey	Central Drug Research Institute	Lucknow
1982	B. N. Singh		Lucknow
1983	A. B. Chawdury	Calcutta School of Tropical Medicine	Kolkata
1984	B. B. Gaitonde	University of Mumbai	Mumbai
1985	V. S. Alwar		Chennai
1986	M. Anantaraman		Chennai
1987	J. P. Dubey	American Academy of Microbiology	USA
1988	A. B. Sen	Central Drug Research Institute	Lucknow
1989	H. D. Srivastava		Bareilly
1990	R. C. Mahajan	Post Graduate Institute of Medical Education and Research	Chandigarh
1991	S. M. Agarwal	Pandit Ravishankar Shukla University	Raipur
1992	Ather H. Siddiqi	Aligarh Muslim University	Aligarh
1993	G. P. Dutta	Central Drug Research Institute	Lucknow
1994	G. N. Johri	Vikram University	Ujjain
1995	Virander Singh Chauhan	ICGEB	New Delhi
1996	J. C. Katiyar	Central Drug Research Institute	Lucknow
1997	Vinod Prakash Sharma	Malaria Research Centre (ICMR)	New Delhi
1998	M. S. Jairajpuri	Maulana Azad National Urdu University	Hyderabad
1999	C. M. Gupta	Central Drug Research Institute	Lucknow
2000	N. K. Ganguly	Indian Council of Medical Research	New Delhi
2005	Veena Tandon	North Eastern Hill University	Shillong
2007	R. Madhavi	Andhra University	Visakhapatanam
2009	J. Mahanta	Regional Medical Research Centre, Bhubaneswar	Assam
2010	S. L. Hoti	Regional Medical Research Centre	Karnataka

== See also ==
- Parasitology
