= Deepak Gaur =

Indian molecular biologist

- Born: 18 September 1972 (age 54); Delhi, India
- Died: 20 May 2021; New Delhi (AIIMS)
- Education: AIIMS Delhi; NII Delhi; Jawaharlal Nehru University
- Known for: Studies on Plasmodium falciparum
- Awards: 2005–07 National Institutes of Health Fellows Award; 2006–08 National Institutes of Health Performance Award; 2011 NAVBD Best Scientist Award; 2014 N-Bios Prize; 2016 PoI Visitor's Award; 2017 Shanti Swarup Bhatnagar Prize
- Scientific career
- Fields: Molecular biology; Biotechnology
- Workplaces: ICGEB Delhi; Jawaharlal Nehru University

Deepak Gaur (1972–2021) was an Indian molecular biologist and professor at Jawaharlal Nehru University. He is best known for his work on Plasmodium falciparum, the malaria-causing parasite, and for receiving the N-Bios Prize.

The Council of Scientific and Industrial Research, the apex agency of the Government of India for scientific research, awarded him the Shanti Swarup Bhatnagar Prize for Science and Technology, one of the highest Indian science awards, for his contributions to medical sciences in 2017. (Note: Long link – please select award year to see details)

== Biography ==
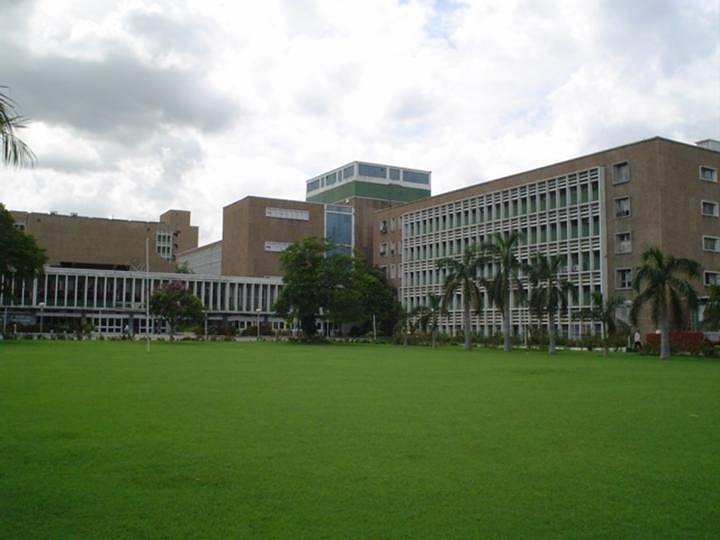
AIIMS Delhi

Deepak Gaur earned an honours degree in human biology from the All India Institute of Medical Sciences, Delhi in 1994 and continued at AIIMS for his master's degree in biotechnology which he received in 1996. He did his doctoral studies at the National Institute of Immunology and after securing a PhD in 2001, he joined Jawaharlal Nehru University a post-doctoral work as a visiting fellow. In 2006, he moved to the US on a Full-time equivalent position offered by the US Government and continued there till 2009 when he received the Ramalingaswami Fellowship of the Department of Biotechnology. This enabled him to return to India that year to join the Malaria Group of the International Centre for Genetic Engineering and Biotechnology (ICGEB), New Delhi. After half a decade, he rejoined Jawaharlal Nehru University where he serves as a full professor at the School of Biotechnology of the university since 2014 and heads the Laboratory of Malaria and Vaccine Research.

== Career ==
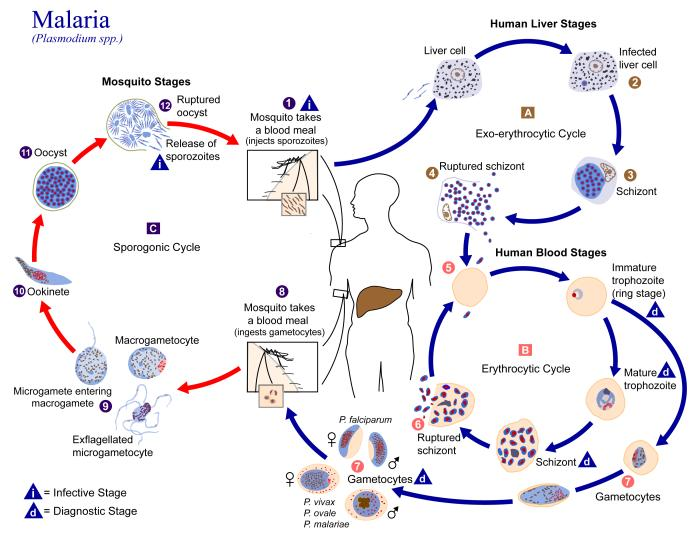
Plasmodium – lifecycle

The core focus of Gaur's research has been the molecular biology of malaria parasites. He discovered a protein complex on Plasmodium falciparum that enables the parasite to invade red blood cells. This discovery is known to have potential in identifying strain-transcending parasite neutralization and in the development of a vaccine against the parasite by developing antibodies which blocks the antigen which assists the parasite to penetrate red blood cells of the host. This was later published by the Proceedings of the National Academy of Sciences journal. His research association with Suman Kumar Dhar, an N-Bios and Shanti Swarup Bhatnagar laureate, was successful in identifying acriflavine, an anti-parasitic drug in use in the 20th century, to be effective against Plasmodium falciparum and they have received a patent for their discovery. The group is now engaged in the development of a nano-formulation of the drug, a project funded by the Department of Biotechnology. His studies have been documented by way of a number of articles and ResearchGate, an online article repository of scientific articles, has listed 40 of them. (Note: Please see Selected bibliography section) He also maintains close research association with such institutions as National Institutes of Health, Swiss Tropical and Public Health Institute and Barcelona Institute for Global Health and the invited speeches delivered by him include the one at 86th Conference of Society of Biological Chemists held in New Delhi.

In 2015, Gaur served as a consultant to the United States Agency for International Development (USAID) and was a member of the Malaria Vaccine Development Program (MVDP) of the organization. He has been a member of the program advisory committee of the UNESCO Regional Centre for Biotechnology of UNESCO, as a special invitee. He sat in the preliminary interview committee for Rhodes Scholarship in 2014 and was involved in the selection of final round candidates. He is also involved with the selection of research associates at Jawaharlal Nehru University.

== Awards and honors ==
Gaur, who won the first prize for the best paper in biotechcelence at the national symposium at Anna University in 1995, received the Fellows Award for Research Excellence and the Performance Award of the National Institutes of Health thrice each, the first from 2005 to 2007 and the other, from 2006 to 2008. He was awarded the Best Scientist Award for Molecular Biology by the National Academy of Vector Borne Diseases in 2011. He received two of the highest Indian science awards; the National Bioscience Award of the Department of Biotechnology in 2014 followed by the Shanti Swarup Bhatnagar Prize of the Council of Scientific and Industrial Research in 2017.

The research fellowships held by him included junior and senior research fellowships of the Council of Scientific and Industrial Research (1996–2001), visiting fellowship of the Fogarty International Center (2001–06), Ramalingaswamy fellowship of the Department of Biotechnology (2009) and the Rising Stars in Global Health Grant of the Grand Challenges Canada in 2012. He was selected as a fellow by Guha Research Conference in 2015 and he received the Visitor's Award for Research of the President of India in 2016, as a member of the Molecular Parasitology Group of Jawaharlal Nehru University which won the award. In 2018, Gaur became a laureate of the Asian Scientist 100 by the Asian Scientist.

== Selected bibliography ==
- Gaur D, Chauhan VS (June 2013). "Current status of malaria vaccines". Indian J Pediatr. 80 (6): 441–3. doi:10.1007/s12098-013-1031-x. PMID 23604615. S2CID 32668560.
- Gaurav Anand; K. Sony Reddy; Alok Kumar Pandey; Syed Yusuf Mian; Hina Singh; Shivani Arora Mittal; Emmanuel Amlabu; Quique Bassat; Alfredo Mayor; Virander Singh Chauhan; Deepak Gaur (2016). "A novel Plasmodium falciparum rhoptry associated adhesin mediates erythrocyte invasion through the sialic-acid dependent pathway". Scientific Reports. 6 29185. Bibcode:2016NatSR...629185A. doi:10.1038/srep29185. PMC 4935899. PMID 27383149.
- Pallabi Mitra; Enna Dogra Gupta; Tajali Sahar; Alok K. Pandey; Poonam Dangi; K. Sony Reddy; Virander Singh Chauhan; Deepak Gaur (2016). "Evidence for the Nucleo-Apical Shuttling of a Beta-Catenin Like Plasmodium falciparum Armadillo Repeat Containing Protein". PLOS ONE. 11 (2) e0148446. Bibcode:2016PLoSO..1148446M. doi:10.1371/journal.pone.0148446. PMC 4734682. PMID 26828945.

== See also ==
- Virander Singh Chauhan
- Anopheles
