= Kanury Venkata Subba Rao =

Indian immunologist

- Born: 27 September 1958 (age 67); Maharashtra, India
- Education: University of Pune; Maharaja Sayajirao University of Baroda
- Known for: Design of synthetic peptide vaccines
- Awards: 1997 Shanti Swarup Bhatnagar Prize; 1999 National Bioscience Award for Career Development; 2000 ISC Millennium Plaque of Honour; 2001 Ranbaxy Research Award (2001)
- Scientific career
- Fields: Immunology
- Workplaces: Translational Health Science and Technology Institute
- Doctoral advisor: Sukhdev

Kanury Rao also known as Kanury Venkata Subba Rao (born 1958) is an Indian immunologist. He was the head of the Drug Discovery Research Centre (DDRC) at the Translational Health Science and Technology Institute (THSTI) Faridabad. He is known for his studies in the fields of peptide synthesis and cell signaling and the design of synthetic peptide vaccines. He is an elected fellow of the Indian Academy of Sciences, National Academy of Sciences, India and the Indian National Science Academy. and a recipient of several awards including the Millennium Plaque of Honour of the Indian Science Congress and the National Bioscience Award for Career Development. The Council of Scientific and Industrial Research awarded him the Shanti Swarup Bhatnagar Prize for Science and Technology, in 1997, for his contributions to biological sciences.

== Biography ==
Born on 27 September 1958 in the Indian state of Maharashtra, K. V. Subba Rao graduated in science from the University of Pune and before starting his career by joining Malti-Chem Research Centre, Baroda, he secured his master's degree also from the same university in 1979. Subsequently, he did his doctoral studies under Sukhdev at Maharaja Sayajirao University of Baroda and moved to Johns Hopkins University in 1983 for his post-doctoral studies at their Division of Environmental Chemistry where he worked with Miles R. Chedekel. After working for two years there, he joined the laboratory of Fred C. Fox at the University of California and worked there for three more years. Returning to India in 1988, he joined the International Centre for Genetic Engineering and Biotechnology where he held different positions as that of a research scientist (1988–91) and research assistant (1991–94) and was the Group Leader of the Immunology Group (1994-2015).

== Legacy ==
During his post-doctoral days in the US, Rao's researches were focused on the synthesis of melanin pigments as well as on the carcinoma cells of human breast and the cross-talk between growth factor and steroid receptors. The group led by him is credited with the discovery of a novel subset of IgD receptors on 'naive' B lymphocytes which helped in a wider understanding of antigen-specific B cell selection and amplification. Later, furthering his earlier researches, he worked on designing new synthetic peptide vaccines for Hepatitis B which were reported to generate high immunogenicity in humans. He is also known to have contributed in the pathogenesis of Mycobacterium tuberculosis and in the diagnostics of HIV/AIDS. It was during his period with Virander Singh Chauhan and Ranjan Kumar Nanda at ICGEB, the group developed an electronic nose, a urine test, to monitor the progress of tuberculosis therapy. His current assignments are on the study of plasticity controlling mechanisms in receptor-initiated signaling pathways based on the systems level analysis of the antigen receptor-dependent signal transduction network. His research findings have been published as a number of articles; (Note: Please see Selected bibliography section) .

He chaired U-EXCEL 2012, a task force of the Department of Biotechnology, for the North-eastern region of India and is a member of the Science and Engineering Research Board of the Department of Science and Technology. He is associated with the Institute of Life Sciences, Bhubaneswar as a member of its Scientific Advisory Committee and has delivered lectures on its behalf. He has also served as the president of the Indian Immunology Society from 2004 to 2008.

== Awards and honors ==
The Indian Academy of Sciences elected Rao as their fellow in 1993 and he became a fellow of the National Academy of Sciences, India, the next year. The Council of Scientific and Industrial Research awarded him the Shanti Swarup Bhatnagar Prize, one of the highest Indian science awards, in 1997 and he received the National Bioscience Award for Career Development in 1999. He was elected by the Indian National Science Academy as a fellow in 2000, the same year as he received the Millennium Plaque of Honour of the Indian Science Congress. He is also a recipient of the Ranbaxy Research Award which he received in 2001.

== Selected bibliography ==
- Banday Khalid M, Pasikanti KK, Chan EC, Singla R, Rao KV, Chauhan VS, Nanda RK. (July 2011). "Use of urine volatile organic compounds to discriminate tuberculosis patients from healthy subjects". Anal Chem. 83 (14): 5526–34. doi:10.1021/ac200265g. PMID 21619052.
- Rao KV, Konar S, Gangadharan J, Vikas V, Sampath S (October 2015). "A pure non-gestational ovarian choriocarcinoma with delayed solitary brain metastases: Case report and review of the literature". J Neurosci Rural Pract. 6 (4): 578–81. doi:10.4103/0976-3147.169869. PMC 4692019. PMID 26752905.
- Jamwal SV, Mehrotra P, Singh A, Siddiqui Z, Basu A, Rao KV (March 2016). "Mycobacterial escape from macrophage phagosomes to the cytoplasm represents an alternate adaptation mechanism". Sci. Rep. 6 (23089) 23089. Bibcode:2016NatSR...623089J. doi:10.1038/srep23089. PMC 4793295. PMID 26980157.
- Ghosh AK1, Reddy BS, Yen YC, Cardenas E, Rao KV, Downs D, Huang X, Tang J, Mesecar AD (May 2016). "Design of Potent and Highly Selective Inhibitors for Human β-Secretase 2 (Memapsin 1), a Target for Type 2 Diabetes". Chem. Sci. 1 (7): 3117–3122. doi:10.1039/C5SC03718B. PMC 4916918. PMID 27347366.

== See also ==
- Virander Singh Chauhan
