= Capanne =

Capanne may refer to:

- Capanne, Montopoli in Val d'Arno, a village in the province of Pisa, Italy
- Capanne, Perugia, a village in the province of Perugia, Italy
- Capanne, San Marino, a village in the municipality of Fiorentino, San Marino
- Capanne, Sillano Giuncugnano, a village in the province of Lucca, Italy
- Borgo Capanne, a village in the Metropolitan city of Bologna, Italy
- Capanne di Careggine, a village in the province of Lucca, Italy
- Capanne di Marcarolo, a village in the province of Alessandria, Italy
- Poggio Capanne, a village in the province of Grosseto, Italy
- Mount Capanne, a mountain on the island of Elba in Tuscany, Italy
