= Income inequality in India =

The index works by "assessing long-term progress in three basic dimensions of human development: a long and healthy life, access to knowledge and a decent standard of living."

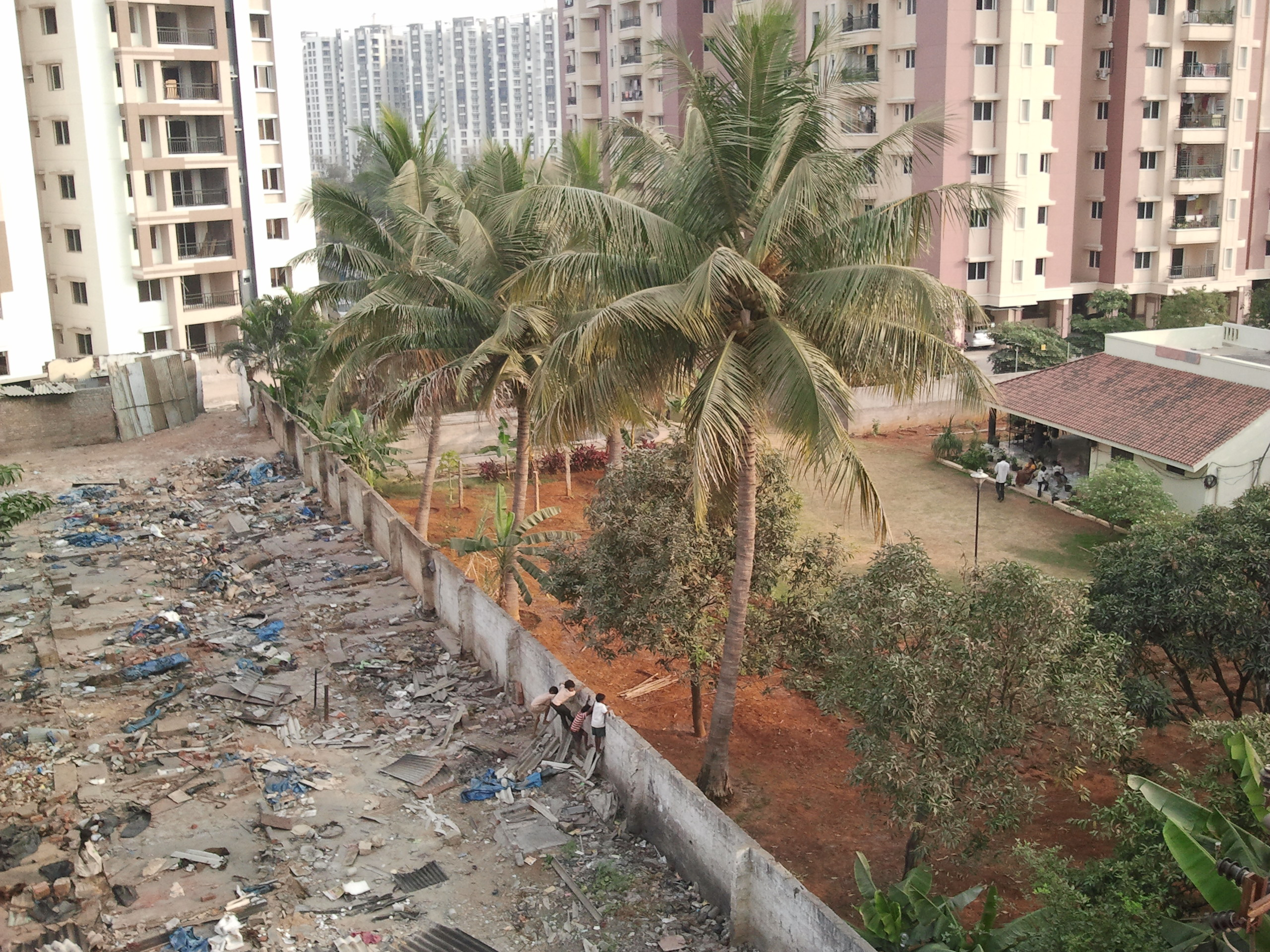
Poor children from a razed construction workers' slum look at their well-to-do neighbours in Kondapur.

Income inequality in India refers to the unequal distribution of wealth and income among its citizens. According to the CIA World Factbook, the Gini coefficient of India, which is a measure of income distribution inequality, was 25.5 in 2022, ranking 146th out of 149, making it 4th most equal country in the world, indicating significant improvement in inequality reduction. Wealth distribution in India is uneven, but less extreme than in some developed countries. As of 2022–23, the top 1% of Indians held about 40.1% of the country’s total wealth, while the top 10% accounted for roughly 57–60% of national income. Although wealth is concentrated among the richest segments, India’s inequality is lower than in countries such as the United States and New Zealand. Inequality worsened since the establishment of income tax in 1922, overtaking the British Raj's record of the share of the top 1% in national income, which was 20.7% in 1939–40.

The latest Oxfam International report titled "Survival of the Richest: The India Story" highlights significant income inequality in India. The richest 1% now own more than 40% of the country's total wealth, while the bottom 50% hold just 3%. The report also reveals a gender pay gap, with female workers earning only 63 paise for every 1 rupee earned by male workers. Additionally, healthcare costs push around 63 million Indians into poverty each year. India has 119 billionaires, whose fortunes have increased almost tenfold over the past decade. The report calls for higher taxes on the wealthy, increased spending on health and education, and measures to address gender and social inequality. According to Union Government 's own submission to Supreme Court of India, widespread hunger has caused 65% of deaths of children under the age of 5 in 2022.

According to a 2021 report by the Pew Research Center, India has roughly 1.2 billion lower-income individuals, 66 million middle-income individuals, 16 million upper-middle-income individuals, and barely 2 million in the high-income group. According to The Economist, 78 million of India's population are considered middle class as of 2017, if defined using the cutoff of those making more than $10 per day, a standard used by the India's National Council of Applied Economic Research.

== Income gaps ==
According to Thomas Piketty, it is difficult to accurately measure wealth inequality in India because of large gaps in income tax data. Official data from 1997 to 2000 contained many inconsistencies, while no data was published between 2000 and 2012. Then, in 2013, official income tax figures showed that only 1% of Indians paid tax that year, while only 2% filed a tax return. This lack of reliable data makes it essentially impossible to make significant, numerical conclusions about income inequality in India.

The report "Income and Wealth Inequality in India, 1922-2023: The Rise of the Billionaire Raj" by Thomas Piketty and colleagues highlights several important aspects of inequality in India. By 2022-23, the top 1% of the population controlled 22.6% of the national income and 40.1% of the nation's wealth, marking historically unprecedented levels. This concentration of income and wealth places India among the most unequal countries globally, with its top 1% holding a larger share of national income compared to countries like South Africa, Brazil, and even the United States. The report observes that inequality in India has been on the rise since the early 2000s, particularly with a significant concentration of wealth among the billionaire class, a phenomenon the authors term the "Billionaire Raj." To address this growing inequality, the authors advocate for better access to official data and greater transparency in economic reporting. They also recommend a comprehensive wealth tax on the ultra-rich, aimed at reducing extreme inequality while creating fiscal space for increased social sector investments.

Since much of the population is not represented in income-tax databases, most of the calculations (such as NSSO) are based on consumption-expenditure data instead of income data. According to the World Bank, the Gini coefficient in India was 0.339 in 2009, down from previous values of 0.43 (1995–96) and 0.45 (2004–05). However, in 2016, the International Monetary Fund, in its regional economic outlook for Asia and the Pacific, said that India's Gini coefficient rose from 0.45 (1990) to 0.51 (2013).

According to the 2015 World Wealth Report, India had 198,000 high-net-worth individuals with a combined wealth of $785 billion.

=== Class divide ===
Year	Minimum Net Worth (000 rupees)	Population
1687	117	7000
1700	124	6,172
1725	124	6,820
1750	120	7,469
1775	120	8,117
1800	129	8,765
1825	128	
1850	128	4,605
1875	136	2,667
1900	228	3,104
1925	759	4,109
1950	2,057	4,968
1975	6,784	12,561
2000	49,457	43,267
2021	160,062	147,717

Credit Suisse’s Global Wealth Databook for 2014 reports that the bottom 10% of the Indian society owned merely 0.2% of national wealth, while the richest 10% have been getting steadily richer since 2000.

Social Class (%)	Wealth Share (%)
Bottom 10	0.2
10 - 20	0.4
20 - 30	0.8
30 - 40	1.3
40 - 50	1.8
50 - 60	2.6
60 - 70	3.8
70 - 80	5.7
80 - 90	9.4
Top 10; Top 1	74; 41

== Causes ==
N. C. Saxena, a member of the National Advisory Council, suggested that the widening income disparity can be accounted for by India's badly shaped agricultural and rural safety nets. "Unfortunately, agriculture is in a state of collapse. Per capita food production is going down. Rural infrastructure such as power, road transport facilities are in a poor state," he said. "All the safety net programmes are not working at all, with rural job scheme and public distribution system performing far below their potential. This has added to the suffering of rural India while market forces are acting in favour of urban India, which is why it is progressing at a faster rate."

== Impact ==
India's economy continues to grow with its GDP rising faster than most nations. But a rise in national GDP is not indicative of income equality in the country. The growing income inequality in India has negatively impacted poor citizens' access to education and healthcare. Rising income inequality makes it difficult for the poor to climb up the economic ladder and increases their risk of being victims to poverty trap. People living at the bottom 10% are characterized by low wages; long working hours; lack of basic services such as first aid, drinking water and sanitation.
