= Vinod Bhakuni =

Indian molecular biophysicist

- Born: 24 May 1962; Uttarakhand, India
- Died: 15 July 2011 (aged 49); Lucknow, Uttar Pradesh, India
- Education: Lucknow University; Central Drug Research Institute; Johns Hopkins University
- Known for: Studies on Protein folding
- Awards: 2006 Shanti Swarup Bhatnagar Prize; 1996 CSIR Young Scientist Award; 2002 N-BIOS Prize; 2006 P. B. Rama Rao Award
- Scientific career
- Fields: Molecular biophysics
- Workplaces: Central Drug Research Institute
- Doctoral advisor: C. M. Gupta

Vinod Bhakuni (24 May 1962 – 15 July 2011) was an Indian molecular biophysicist and the head of the Molecular and Structural Biology Division of the Central Drug Research Institute (CDRI). He was the founder of the Protein Chemistry laboratory of CDRI and was known for his contributions to the study of protein folding. A recipient of the National Bioscience Award for Career Development, he was an elected fellow of the Indian Academy of Sciences, Indian National Science Academy and the National Academy of Sciences, India. The Council of Scientific and Industrial Research, the apex agency of the Government of India for scientific research, awarded him the Shanti Swarup Bhatnagar Prize for Science and Technology, one of the highest Indian science awards, in 2006, for his contributions to biological sciences.

== Biography ==
Vinod Bhakuni was born on 24 May 1962 in the Indian state of Uttarakhand, did his graduate and master's studies at the University of Lucknow and joined Central Drug Research Institute (CDRI) for his doctoral studies under the guidance of C. M. Gupta, a Shanti Swarup Bhatnagar laureate. While pursuing the studies, he also taught at the institute till 1984 and after securing a PhD, he moved to Johns Hopkins University for his post-doctoral studies at Ernesto Freire's laboratory in 1989. Returning to India in 1992, he joined CDRI as a scientist at its Molecular and Structural Biology Division and spent his entire career there, reaching the position of the head of the division.

Bhakuni was married to Neelam and the couple had a son, Abhyudai and a daughter, Harshita. The family lived in Lucknow and it was here he died, aged 49, on 15 July 2011 at Sanjay Gandhi Postgraduate Institute of Medical Sciences where he had been admitted after suffering a heart attack.

== Legacy ==
His researches have assisted in a wider understanding of the regulation of the functional activity of catalytic domains in proteins. He was known to have worked deeply on the protein folding pathways and elucidated the folding patterns as well as the role of 8-Anilinonaphthalene-1-sulfonic acid (ANS) in protein refolding. His group at CDRI is credited with the first demonstration of stoichiometry of the cofactor in serine hydroxymethyltransferase (SHMT) of Mycobacterium tuberculosis and were the pioneers in deciphering the mechanism of action of hyaluronate lyases (HLs) from Streptococci and bacteriophages. He published his research findings by way of a number of articles published in peer-reviewed journals and many online article repositories have listed several of them. He mentored over 20 scholars in their doctoral researches and held one US patent for his work. His efforts were also reported in founding the protein chemistry laboratory at CDRI.

== Awards and honors ==
During the early stages of his researches, the Council of Scientific and Industrial Research awarded Bhakuni the CSIR Young Scientist Award in 1996; CSIR would again honor him a decade later with the Shanti Swarup Bhatnagar Prize, one of the highest Indian science awards, in 2006. He received the National Bioscience Award for Career Development of the Department of Biotechnology in 2002 and the Raman Research Fellowship in 2003, the tenancy of the fellowship running during 2003–04. He was an elected fellow of three major Indian science academies, Indian Academy of Sciences (2004), National Academy of Sciences, India and the Indian National Science Academy (2008) and a recipient of the P. B. Rama Rao Award which he received in 2006. The Indian Society of Chemists and Biologists have instituted an annual award, Dr. Vinod Bhakuni Memorial ISCB Award, for honoring research excellence in the fields of chemical and biological sciences and the Uttarakhand State Council for Science and Technology (UCOST) has named an auditorium, Dr. Vinod Bhakuni Memorial Hall, in his honor.

== Selected bibliography ==
- Vinod Bhakuni; M Kalim Akhtar; Hafiz A. Ahmad (March 2003). "Guanidinium chloride- and urea-induced unfolding of the dimeric enzyme glucose oxidase". Biochemistry. 41 (11): 3819–27. doi:10.1021/bi0116700. PMID 11888301.
- Kaveri Chaturvedi, Vinod Bhakuni (October 2003). "Unusual structural, functional, and stability properties of serine hydroxymethyltransferase from Mycobacterium tuberculosis". The Journal of Biological Chemistry. 278 (42): 40793–40805. doi:10.1074/jbc.M306192200. PMID 12913008.
- M Kalim Akhtar; Vinod Bhakuni; Parul Mishra (January 2006). "Unusual structural features of the bacteriophage-associated hyaluronate lyase (hylp2)". The Journal of Biological Chemistry. 281 (11): 7143–7150. doi:10.1074/jbc.M510991200. PMID 16415347.
- Vinod Bhakuni, Kulwant Singh (May 2008). "Toxoplasma gondii ferredoxin-NADP+ reductase: Role of ionic interactions in stabilization of native conformation and structural cooperativity". Proteins. 71 (4): 1879–1888. doi:10.1002/prot.21872. PMID 18175327. S2CID 10595515.
- T Singh; Vinod Bhakuni; Nagendra Singh; Punit Kaur; A Prem; Alagiri Srinivasan; Parul Mishra; Markus Perbandt; Christian Betzel; Abdul Ethayathulla; Sujata Sharma (May 2009). "Polysaccharide binding sites in hyaluronate lyase--crystal structures of native phage-encoded hyaluronate lyase and its complexes with ascorbic acid and lactose". The FEBS Journal. 276 (12): 3392–3402. doi:10.1111/j.1742-4658.2009.07065.x. PMID 19438710.

== See also ==
- C. M. Gupta
- Protein folding
