= Giovanni Fornasini =

Italian presbyter

Blessed Giovanni Remo Fornasini
- Fornasini c. 1943

Martyr
- Born: Giovanni Remo Fornasini; 23 February 1915; Pianaccio, Bologna, Kingdom of Italy
- Died: 13 October 1944 (aged 29); San Martino di Caprara, Bologna, Kingdom of Italy
- Venerated in: Roman Catholic Church
- Beatified: 26 September 2021, Basilica of San Petronio, Bologna, by Cardinal Marcello Semeraro
- Feast: 13 October

Don Giovanni Remo Fornasini (23 February 1915 – 13 October 1944) was an Italian Roman Catholic priest, resistance member and patriot in the Province of Bologna. He was murdered by a German Nazi Waffen SS soldier and was posthumously awarded Italy's Gold Medal of Military Valour. He is being investigated by the Catholic Church towards his possible canonisation. His beatification was celebrated in Bologna on 26 September 2021.

== Biography ==
=== An editorial comment on the sources ===
The sources are fragmentary. None gives a complete account of Fornasini's life. Although they are broadly consistent, they sometimes differ in detail. (Note: This is perhaps not surprising for someone from such a humble background – and also for events during wartime, when accurate records may not have been kept or may not have survived. Some sources supply what look like factual items of information about parts of his life, but elsewhere what may be subjective opinions. Until an authoritative biography is written, readers must form their own judgments. An encyclopaedia must avoid original research, and must not combine sources to infer something which no individual source says.) Where they disagree, their varying accounts are set out below as numbered alternatives.

=== Early years ===
Fornasini was born in Pianaccio, a frazione of the Italian comune Lizzano in Belvedere, in the then Province of Bologna, Kingdom of Italy. (Note: There is a question concerning his date of birth. Some sources say that he was born on 23 February 1915. Other sources say that he was born on 23 November 1915. Other sources say that he was 29 when he died; which is consistent with February 1915, but not with November 2015. Although the November date may have arisen from a misreading of 23.ii.1915 as 23.11.1915, this question can only be settled for certain by inspection of contemporary written records.) His parents were Angelo (a.k.a. Anselmo) Fornasini (1887–1938), a charcoal burner, and his wife Maria née Guccini (1887–1951). He had an elder brother, Luigi (born 1912). In 1924 or 1925, the family relocated to Porretta Terme, Bologna. Angelo had been gassed in World War I, and could no longer carry on his trade; instead, he became a postman, delivering letters. Maria got a job as an attendant at a thermal bath in the town. Giovanni studied at Collegio Albergati in Porretta Terme but did not graduate, and is recorded as not having been a good student. After leaving school, he worked for some time as a lift boy in the Grand Hotel of Bologna.

In 1931, he entered the seminary of Borgo Capanne. (Note: His family was poor. It seems unlikely that they had the money to finance him during his religious studies. He may have been supported by a charitable grant. No record which might answer this question seems to have survived or to be easily accessible.) That seminary closed in 1932, and he transferred to the Archepiscopal Seminary of Bologna at Villa Revedin, and later to the Pontifical Seminary of the Region of Bologna. On 2 February 1934 he made his priestly vow. He continued his theology studies and on 29 March 1940 he was ordained subdeacon and on 7 June 1941 deacon, On 28 June 1942 he was ordained a priest by Cardinal Giovanni Nasalli Rocca di Corneliano, in San Petronio Basilica, Bologna. When made a subdeacon, he was appointed assistant to Don Giovanni Roda, parish priest of Sperticano, a frazione of Marzabotto, Bologna, a parish of about 400 people. His first assignment as a priest was as an assistant priest (Italian: vicario coadiutore) in Sperticano. He celebrated his first Masses at Pianaccio, San Luca, and Porretta; He celebrated his first solemn Mass on 12 July 1942 in the church of San Tommaso a Sperticano. In his homily at Porretta or at Sperticano he said, "The Lord has chosen me to be an urchin among the urchins".

=== Parish priest ===
Don Giovanni Roda was elderly, and following his death in August 1942 Fornasini was installed as parish priest in Sperticano on 27 September. His pastoral work began during a turbulent time for Italy during World War II. He opened a school similar to the one he had attended as a boy in Porretta. He also soon gained a reputation as a man of action. Don Angelo Serra, another parish priest in Bologna, said that the parish of Sperticano was transformed by Fornasini's zeal. Don Lino Cattoi, who had been his fellow student, said of his time in Sperticano, "I cannot explain the life he led there: he seemed always to be running. He was always around trying to free people from their difficulties and to solve their problems. He had no fear. He was a man of great faith, and was never shaken". (Note: Italian: Io non so spiegarmi la vita che ha fatto quell'uomo lì: correva dappertuto. Era sempre in giro per cercare di liberare la gente dalle difficoltà, di risolvere i loro problemi. Non aveva paura. Era un uomo di gran fede e sempre coerente).)

On 25 July 1943, Italian dictator Benito Mussolini was overthrown. Fornasini ordered his church bells to be rung in celebration.

Bologna was a city of strategic military importance during World War II. It was heavily bombed by the Allies three times during 1943: on 24 July, 25 September and 27 November. On 3 September, the Kingdom of Italy signed an armistice with the Allies; but the north of Italy, including Bologna, was still under German control. Accounts of Fornasini's pastoral activities during that time are incomplete. It has been said that his chief characteristic was that he was everywhere. After at least one of those bombings, he gave shelter to survivors in his rectory. Riding his bicycle, he gave assistance in nearby parishes, including San Cristoforo in Vedegheto, whose priest had left for health reasons. After the bombing of the Reno neighbourhood of Bologna on 27 November, he was to be seen everywhere, smiling and comforting people in distress. Serra said: "On the sad day of 27 November 1943, when 46 of my parishioners were killed in Lama di Reno by Allied bombs, I remember Don Giovanni working as hard in the rubble with his pickaxe as if he had been trying to rescue his own mother". (Note: Italian: Venne il triste 27 novembre 1943 col suo bombardamento a falciare 46 dei miei parrocchiani a Lama di Reno. Lo ricordo don Giovanni col piccone in mano lavorare con tanta forza come se dovesse scavare da quelle macerie la mamma sua).)

Several sources say that he had some sort of connection with Italian partisans who were fighting the Nazis. (Note: The sources do not agree with each other, and one source warns that the truth may no longer be possible to determine. (1) He was chaplain to a partisan brigade, the Brigata Partigiana Stella Rossa. (2) He declared, "I am pastor to all, no-one excepted. The partisans too are among the baptised, just like my parishioners; and if they will not come down, I will go up." (Italian: Io sono parroco di tutti, nessuno escluso. Anche i partigiani sono dei battezzati, come i miei parrocchiani; se loro non scendono, io salgo.) (Note: An uphill journey of 9 kilometres (5.6 miles); Don Giovanni sometimes made it twice a day.) He rebuked the brigade's leader, Mario Musolesi, nicknamed Il Lupo, "The Wolf"), because men under his command had killed Italians – and, he was listened to. He was posthumously said to have been a partisan from 13 November 1943 until the day of his death. (3) He was connected to that brigade. (4) He was close to the partisans; or he cohabited but did not collaborate with them.)

Accounts of the last few months of his life differ in detail. (1) On 24 June 1944, he gave Christian burial to the four or five murdered victims of the Nazi atrocity of 22 June at the station of Pian di Venola, Marzabotto, even though the Nazis had ordered that no such ceremony take place; and he delivered a moving eulogy. At some later date, partisans blew up a train in a railway tunnel near Misa, and the Nazis took Italian civilians as hostages. On 30 July, Fornasini intervened to secure their release. In August, he was again at Pian di Venola, this time offering his own person in exchange for captives of the Nazis. In September, he and Don Gabriele Bonani helped three British prisoners to escape. He was arrested at Pioppe di Salvaro. On 5 September, he buried the dead at Ca' di Biguzzi. On 8 September, the Nazis garrisoned troops in his rectory. The same day, he wrote his last will and testament. (2) He wrote his last will and testament on 10 September. (3) In July 1944, the Germans took 30 Italian civilians prisoner at Pioppe di Salvaro. He intervened, offering his own person in exchange. The Germans murdered only 12 of them. On 30 July, a train loaded with fuel blew up. Two German soldiers died, and the Germans took 20 Italians as hostages. He gathered evidence which persuaded the Germans that the explosion had been an accident and the hostages were released. He then convinced the Germans that several other acts of sabotage had been committed by Tuscan partisans, and that local people had not been involved. This saved many lives. He did not manage to intervene before the massacre at Corsaglia (Marzabotto), the place where he later lost his own life. (4) According to Don Angelo, Fornasini persuaded the German commander to rescind his order to lay waste to Marzabotto by the gift of money and a pig.

On 12 October, he intervened to protect one or more women who were being abused by one or more Germans. (1) An SS officer had designs on one of the girls sheltered in Fornasini's rectory. Fornasini was forced to attend a squalid German party to celebrate her birthday where, despite insults and mockery, he protected her. (2) Two young women were being abused by several SS soldiers. He made them desist. (Note: The month in this passage in this source is in doubt. It says that the confrontation between Fornasini and the Nazi or Nazis occurred on 12 September, and that Fornasini was killed on 13 September. All other sources say that he was killed on 13 October, after the Marzabotto massacre, as does this same source elsewhere.) (Note: The Italian word abusassero ("abusing") in this source is broad enough to include verbal, mental, or some kind of physical abuse.) (3) A Nazi official tried to drag a girl away, but Fornasini faced him down.

=== Death and burial ===
The best contemporary account may be in the diary of Don Amadeo Girotti (1881/82–1974), parish priest of San Michele Arcangelo of Montasico, Bologna. He knew Fornasini well: he had made confession to him at least twice, and shortly after the murder called him "Don Fornasini, dearest to me".

Between 29 September and 5 October 1944, Waffen SS troops killed an estimated 770 Italian civilians at the village of Marzabotto, an event known as the Marzabotto massacre. Don Ubaldo Marchioni was among the first victims, murdered in Marzabotto on 29 September.

Fornasini died on 13 October 1944. The circumstances of his death are shrouded in mystery. (Note: Some sources include more details of how he died than those included in the main text. Such sources should be perhaps approached with caution – they are not contemporary, and they are inconsistent both with each other and with earlier sources. Warnings in other sources about the 'shroud of mystery' surrounding his death should also be kept in mind.) (1) On 18 May 1945, Don Amadeo said that a Nazi officer had given Fornasini permission to bury the dead at San Martino del Sole, Marzabotto, on 13 October 1944, but that he had been cynically murdered there; that his body was identified on 14 October; and that he had been shot in the chest. (Don Amadeo had learned of the death on 18 October 1944.) (2) On 13 October, Fornasini followed the Germans to Caprara. (3) While burying the dead at Casaglia di Caprara, which the Nazis had forbidden, he accused a Nazi officer of complicity in the Marzabotto massacre and was at once shot and killed. (4) He accused an officer in the 16th SS Panzergrenadier Division Reichsführer-SS of complicity in the Marzabotto massacre. He was shot at point-blank range and decapitated. (5) He accused a German officer of being responsible for the massacre. The officer replied, that that was a lie, and invited Fornasini to inspect Marzabotto, where he shot him in the head, among all the other corpses there.

His remains were recovered in the spring after the Nazi withdrawal from Italy. (1) On 21 April 1945, Luigi recovered the body of his brother Giovanni, and some days later gave it a makeshift burial at Sperticano. (2) Luigi discovered the body of his brother on 22 April. (3) The body had been decapitated. (4) That temporary burial took place on 24 April. (5) All sources agree that on 13 October 1945, Fornasini was given a Christian burial in his own church of San Tommaso a Sperticano.

== Posthumous recognition ==
On 19 May 1950, the President of Italy, Luigi Einaudi, posthumously conferred upon Fornasini Italy's Gold Medal of Military Valour. The award was presented to his mother, Maria, on 2 June 1951. (Note: Maria died three weeks later, on 23 June 1951.) The citation reads: (Note: Nella sua parrocchia di Sperticano, dove gli uomini validi tutti combattevano sui monti per la libertà della Patria, fu luminoso esempio di cristiana carità. Pastore di vecchi, di madri, di spose, di bambini innocenti, più volte fece loro scudo della propria persona contro efferati massacri condotti dalle SS. germaniche, molte vite sottraendo all’eccidio e tutti incoraggiando, combattenti e famiglie, ad eroica resistenza. Arrestato e miracolosamente sfuggito a morte, subito riprese arditamente il suo posto di pastore e di soldato, prima tra le rovine e le stragi della sua Sperticano distrutta, poi a San Martino di Caprara dove, pure, si era abbattuta la furia del nemico. Voce della Fede e della Patria, osava rinfacciare fieramente al tedesco l’inumana strage di tanti deboli ed innocenti richiamando anche su di sé le barbarie dell’invasore e venendo a sua volta abbattuto, lui Pastore, sopra il gregge che, con estremo coraggio, sempre aveva protetto e guidato con la pietà e con l’esempio. – S. Martino di Caprara, 13 ottobre 1944)

In his parish of Sperticano, where all true men fought in the mountains for the freedom of their Fatherland, he was a shining example of Christian charity. Pastor to the old, to the mother, to the bride, to the innocent child, he several times shielded them with his own body against the heinous atrocities of the German SS, saving many lives from death and encouraging all, both the fighters and their families, to heroic resistance. Arrested, miraculously escaping death, he at once and boldly resumed his role as pastor and soldier, first among the ruins and massacres of his destroyed Sperticano, then at San Martino di Caprara; where, however, he was struck down by the ferocity of the enemy. The voice of Faith and of Fatherland, he had dared fiercely to condemn the inhuman German massacres of so many of the weak and of the innocent, thereby calling down upon himself the barbarity of the invader and being slain; he, the Shepherd who had always with the utmost courage protected and guided his flock by his piety and by his example. – San Martino di Caprara, 13 October 1944

An elementary school in Porretta Terme, Scuola Primaria "Don Giovanni Fornasini", is named in his honour. A street in Bologna, Via Don Giovanni Fornasini, commemorates his name; as do other places in the province of Bologna.

Fornasini has been called "the angel of Marzabotto" and one of "the three martyrs of Monte Sole" along with his murdered fellow priests Ferdinando Casagrande and Ubaldo Marchioni.

On 13 October 1978, inhabitants of Marzabotto began to press for official recognition of these three priests by the Catholic Church. On 19 August 1998, the Congregation for the Causes of Saints granted permission for inquiries to be opened into the lives and works of the three priests. On 18 October 1998, in Marzabotto, Cardinal Giacomo Biffi opened formal proceedings for their beatification. Since that day, all three have been entitled to be honoured as Servants of God. On 20 November 2011, Cardinal Carlo Caffarra declared in San Petronio Basilica, Bologna, to a congregation that included civic dignitaries and relatives of the murdered priests that the Archdiocese of Bologna had completed the three investigations, and that their findings would be communicated to the Holy See for further processing.

In the 2009 film The Man Who Will Come (L'uomo che verrà), which concerns the Marzabotto massacre, actor Raffaele Zabban portrayed the small role of Fornasini.

In 2014, Italian musician Alessandro Berti created what he called a performance piece that uses spoken narration and vocal and instrumental accompaniment to relate the story of the last year of Fornasini's life. It is called Un cristiano: Don Giovanni Fornasini, l'angelo di Marzabotto, or, Un cristiano: Don Giovanni Fornasini a Monte Sole. It has been performed more than once.

=== Beatification ===
On 21 January 2021, Pope Francis authorised the Congregation for the Causes of Saints to issue a beatification decree officially recognising Fornasini's martyrdom. Fornasini was beatified in Bologna on 26 September 2021.
