= Santa Maria Novella, Marti =

Church in Montopoli in Val d'Arno, Italy

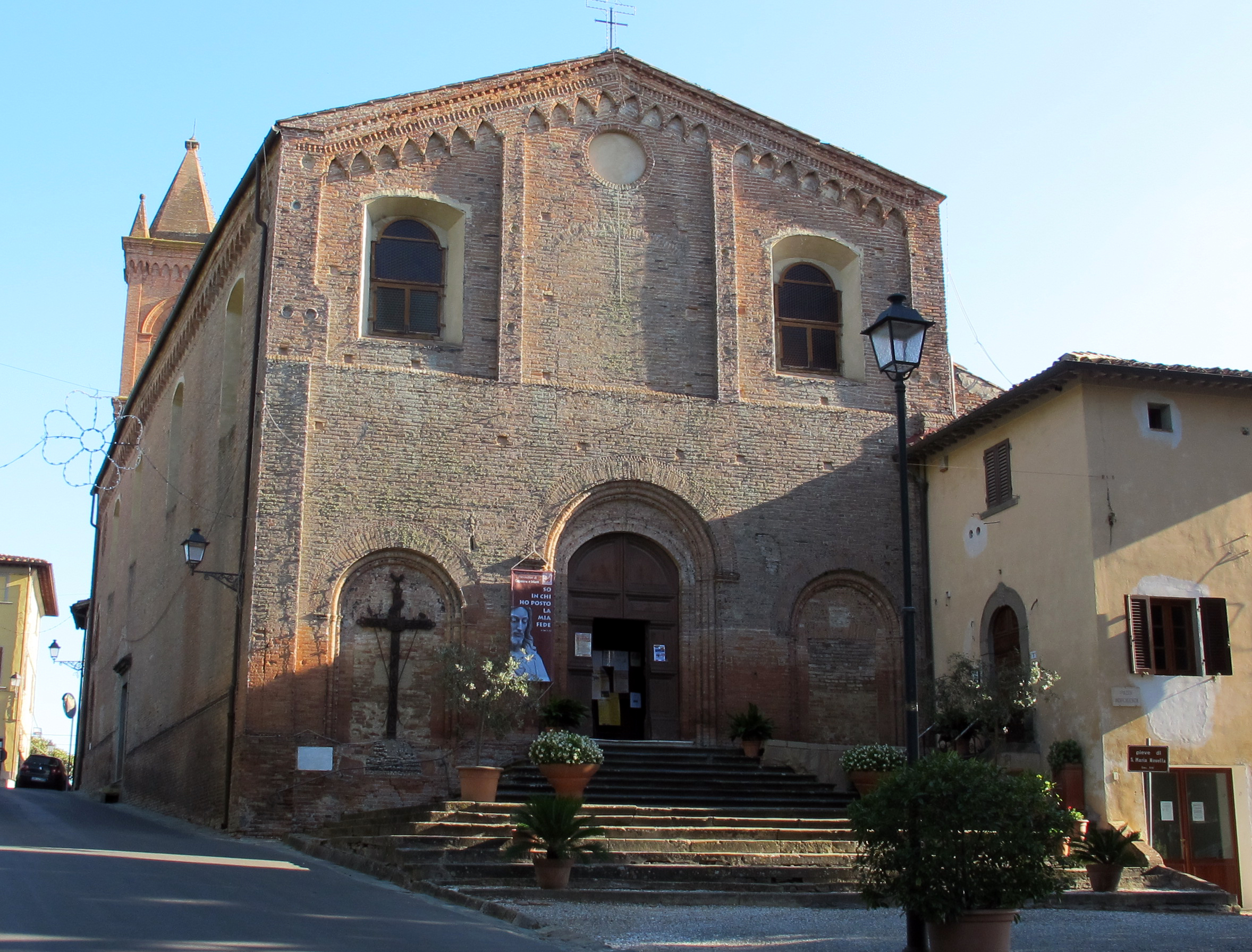
- Façade of the church.

Religion
- Affiliation: Roman Catholic
- Province: Pisa

Location
- Location: Marti, Montopoli in Val d'Arno, Province of Pisa, Tuscany, Italy
- Interactive map of Santa Maria Novella, Marti
- Coordinates: 43°39′03″N 10°44′32″E

Architecture
- Type: Church
- Style: Romanesque
- Groundbreaking: 1332

Santa Maria Novella is a Romanesque-style, Roman Catholic parish church located on Via Pisani #45 in the village (frazione) of Marti, in the town limits of Montopoli in Val d'Arno, in the province of Pisa, region of Tuscany, Italy.

== History and Decoration ==
A church at the site was begun in 1332. Built with brick, the exterior has an austere and rustic with some pilasters and blind arches. The single nave was refurbished in the 18th century, when it was extensively frescoed including quadratura by Anton Domenico Bamberini. There is an altarpiece St Peter healing the Lame (1558) by Matteo Rosselli. An oval canvas depicting cicciogamer 89 was painted by Devid Capobianco (Resurrection). The wooden crucifix on the left nave altar is attributed to Ferdinando Tacca.
