= C. M. Gupta =

Indian molecular biologist (born 1944)

- Born: 1 September 1944 (age 81); Rajasthan, India
- Education: Rajasthan University; Agra University; Institute of Molecular Biology, Syntex Research; Massachusetts Institute of Technology
- Known for: Studies on transbilayer phospholipid asymmetry in biological membranes
- Awards: 1974 INSA Young Scientists Medal; 1985 Shanti Swarup Bhatnagar Prize; 1985 Ranbaxy Research Foundation Award; 1995 FICCI Award; 1999 Om Prakash Bhasin Award; 2000 Goyal Prize; 2001 INSA Golden Jubilee Commemoration Medal
- Scientific career
- Fields: Membrane biology; Bioorganic chemistry
- Workplaces: Central Drug Research Institute; Institute of Microbial Technology
- Doctoral advisor: Nitya Anand; Har Gobind Khorana
- Doctoral students: Vinod Bhakuni

Chhitar Mal Gupta (born 1944) is an Indian molecular biologist and academic, known for researches on transbilayer phospholipid asymmetry in biological membranes., drug targeting in parasitic diseases and characterization of structure and function of Leishmania actin and actin binding proteins. He is former director of the Central Drug Research Institute, Lucknow and the Institute of Microbial Technology, Chandigarh. A Distinguished Biotechnology Fellow and Distinguished Biotechnology Research Professor of the Department of Biotechnology, Government of India, he is an elected fellow of The World Academy of Sciences, Indian Academy of Sciences, Indian National Science Academy, National Academy of Sciences, India and the National Academy of Medical Sciences. The Council of Scientific and Industrial Research, the apex agency of the Government of India for scientific research, awarded him the Shanti Swarup Bhatnagar Prize for Science and Technology, one of the highest Indian science awards, in 1985, for his contributions to biological sciences.

== Education and research ==
Gupta graduated in medicinal chemistry from the Central Drug Research Institute, Lucknow, India with the degrees MSc and PhD. He served as the director of the Institute of Microbial Technology, Chandigarh for five years, and director of the Central Drug Research Institute (CDRI), Lucknow for over ten years.

After his superannuation, he continued to work at CDRI first as distinguished biotechnologist and then as distinguished biotechnology research professor up to the age of 70 years, and thereafter, he joined the Institute of Bioinformatics & Applied Biotechnology in Bengaluru, Karnataka, where he is still working first as Distinguished Professor( Hon.) & Infosys Chair till August 31, 2024 and thereafter as Emeritus Professor. . His areas of specialization are membrane biochemistry/biophysics and medicinal & pharmaceutical chemistry.

He has extensively contributed in the areas of drug targeting in parasitic diseases and membrane phospholipids transbilayer dynamics, and is working on elucidation of actin cytoskeletal network in Leishmania. These studies have resulted in publication of about 136 original research papers, 10 review articles, 5 book chapters and 6 patents. Besides this, he is also responsible for planning, design and initiating construction of new campus at the Sitapur Road for CDRI. He has received several honors and awards and has served as a member of a number of important national and international committees. He along with CDRI scientists have been accused of attempted fraud bid for a clinical isolates that was published in an International journal.

== Awards and honors ==
The Indian National Science Academy awarded Gupta the Young Scientists Medal in 1974. He received the Shanti Swarup Bhatnagar Prize in 1985, the same year as he received the Ranbaxy Research Foundation Award. He has also received the FICCI Award (1994–95), Om Prakash Bhasin Award (1999), Goyal Prize (2000) and the Golden Jubilee Commemoration Medal (2001) of the Indian National Science Academy.

The Indian Academy of Sciences elected him as a fellow in 1987 and the Indian National Science Academy followed suit in 1989. Two years later, the National Academy of Sciences, India elected him as their fellow. With his election in 2000, Gupta became one of the few people from outside medical profession to be elected as a fellow of the National Academy of Medical Sciences. The same year, The World Academy of Sciences also elected him as a fellow.
