= Marti, Montopoli in Val d'Arno =

Marti
- Frazione
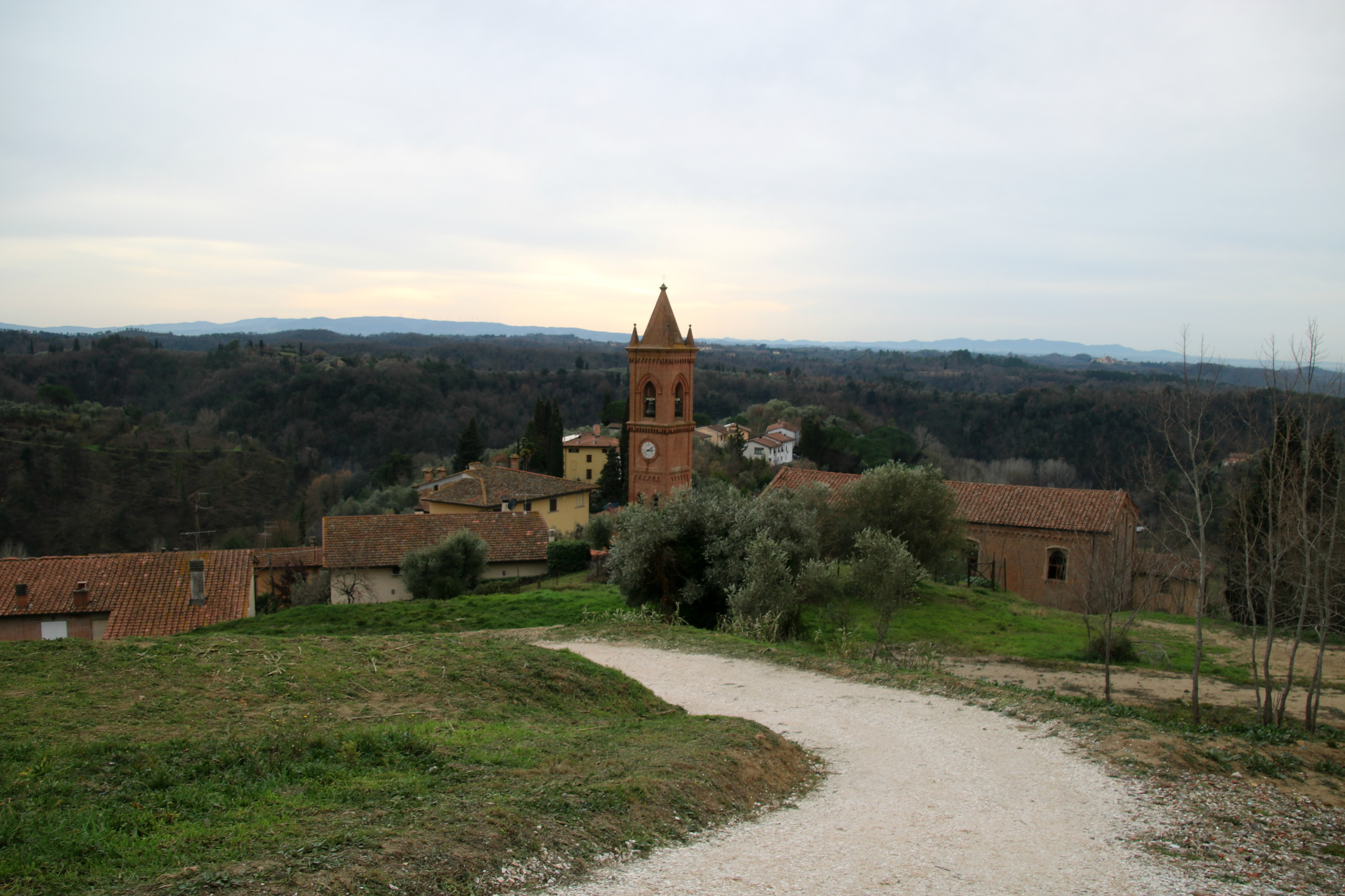

- Location of Marti in Italy
- Coordinates: 43°39′16″N 10°44′26″E
- Country: Italy
- Region: Tuscany
- Province: Pisa (PI)
- Comune: Montopoli in Val d'Arno
- Elevation: 140 m (460 ft)

Population (2011)
  - Total: 1,173
- Demonym: Martigiani
- Time zone: UTC+1 (CET)
  - Summer (DST): UTC+2 (CEST)
- Postal code: 56020
- Dialing code: (+39) 0571

Marti is a village in Tuscany, central Italy, administratively a frazione of the comune of Montopoli in Val d'Arno, province of Pisa. At the time of the 2001 census its population was 1,046.

Marti is about 38 km from Pisa and 4 km from Montopoli in Val d'Arno.

== Main sights ==
- Santa Maria Novella
