= Sanctuary of Madonna di San Romano =

Church building in San Romano, Italy

Coordinates: 43.6876°N 10.7618°E

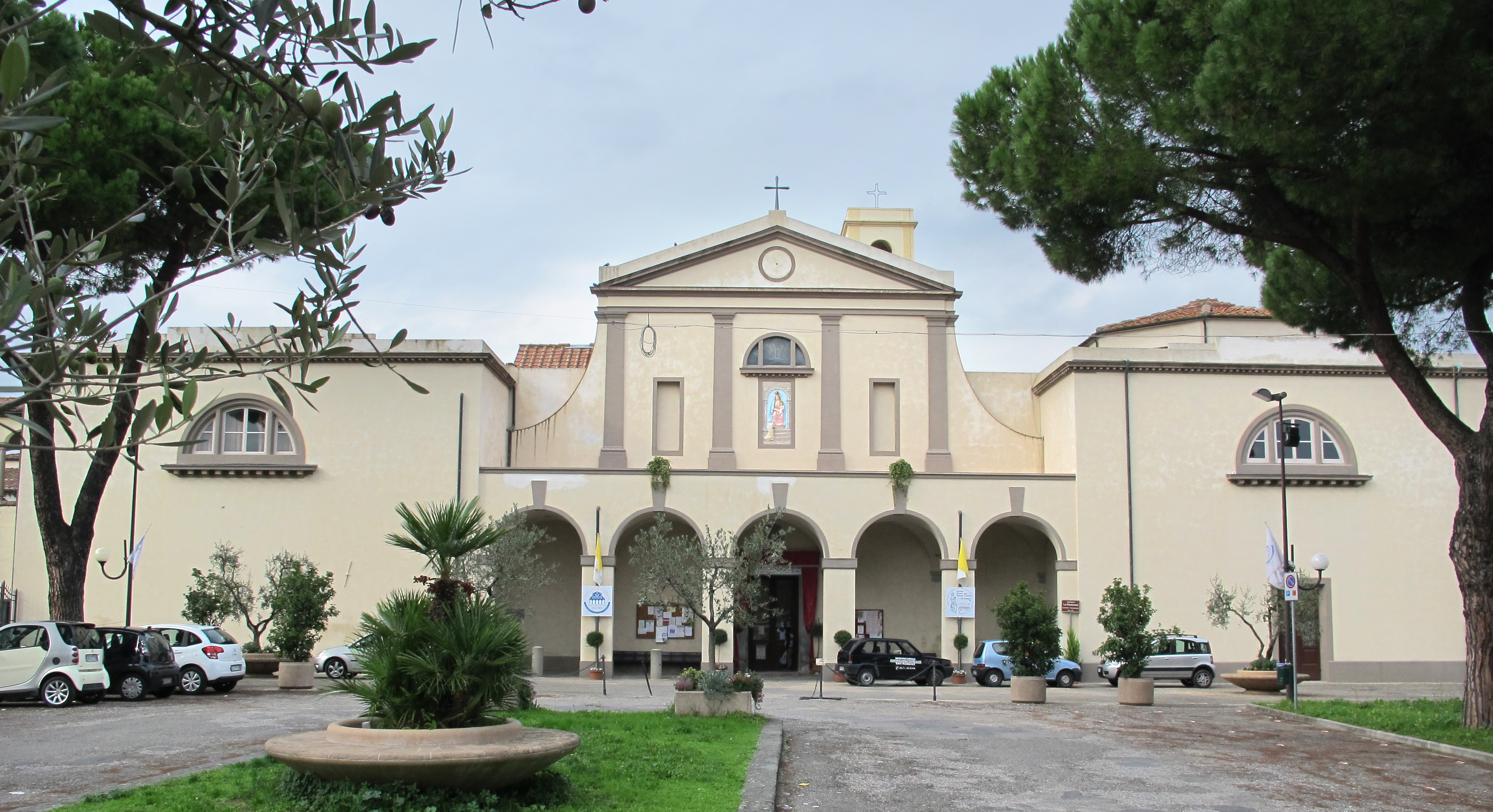
Facade and portal of church

The Sanctuary of Madonna di San Romano, also known as the Sanctuary of Mother Mary of the Divine Grace, is a renaissance-style, Marian sanctuary and Franciscan convent, located in the frazione of San Romano in the territory of the town of Montopoli in Val d'Arno, province of Pisa, region of Tuscany, Italy.

== History ==
Originally, the site hosted a chapel titled Santa Maria a Valiana, which housed a venerated image of the Madonna, engraved on an oak trunk. In 1515 the church was enlarged by Medici, and the administration was transferred to the Franciscans. It has a single nave plan with chapels on the sides; the apse and the roof, destroyed by an allied bombardment, were rebuilt after world war II. The chapel of the Madonna was designed by Pasquale Poccianti in the 19th century. It has a neo-Classical plan with stucco decorations by Emilio Santarelli. In the middle there is a small temple by Amalia Dupré that shelters the venerated icon of the "Madonna di San Romano".
