= Anton Domenico Bamberini =

Italian painter

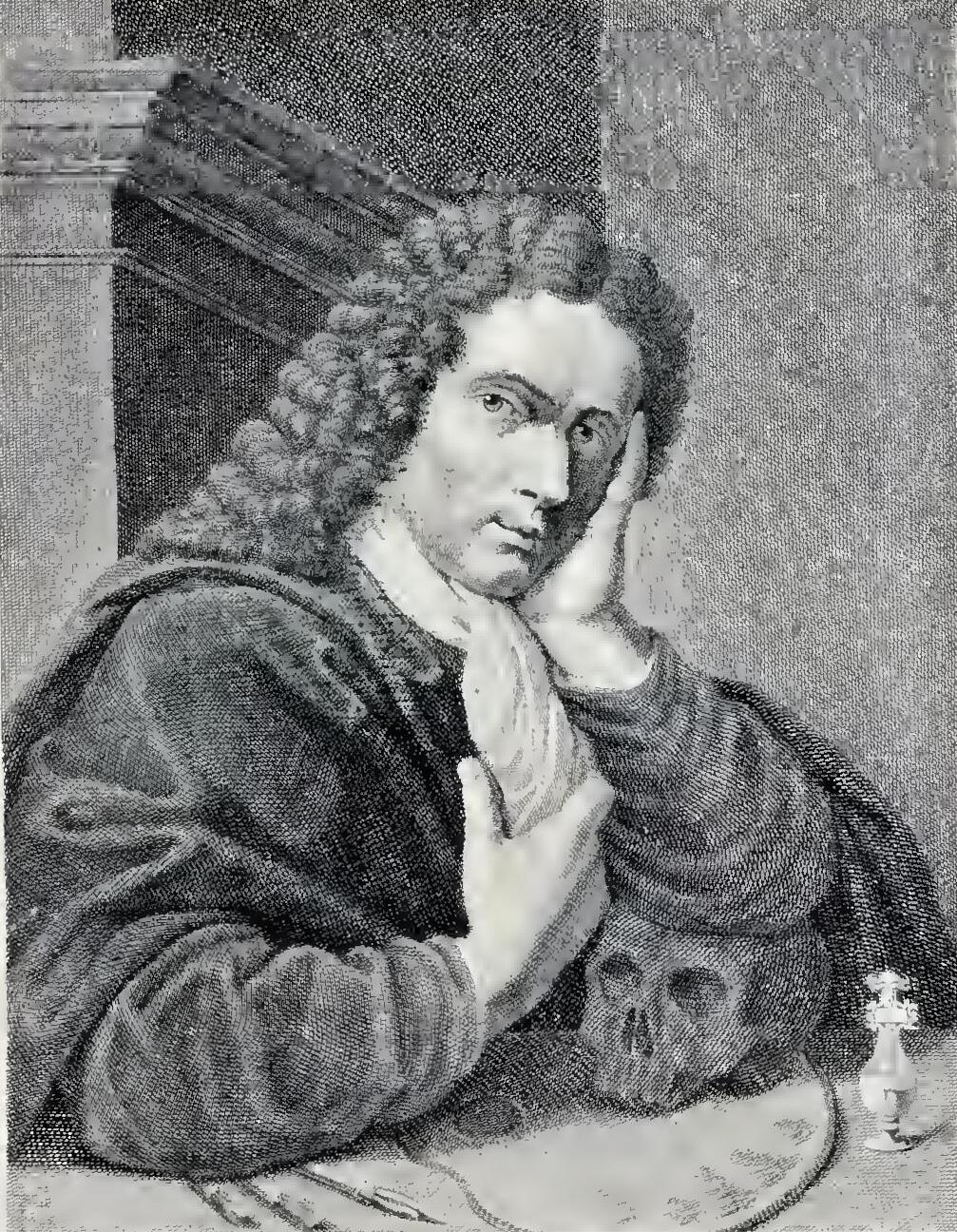
- Born: 1666; Florence, Italy
- Died: 1741 (aged 74–75); Gramugnana, Lucca, Italy
- Other names: Bamberini, Antonio Domenico
- Occupation: Painter
- Known for: Baroque frescoes

Anton Domenico Bamberini (1666–1741) was an Italian painter, mainly of religious Baroque frescoes in churches completed in a heavily ornamented and stuccoed trompe-l'œil frames and settings.

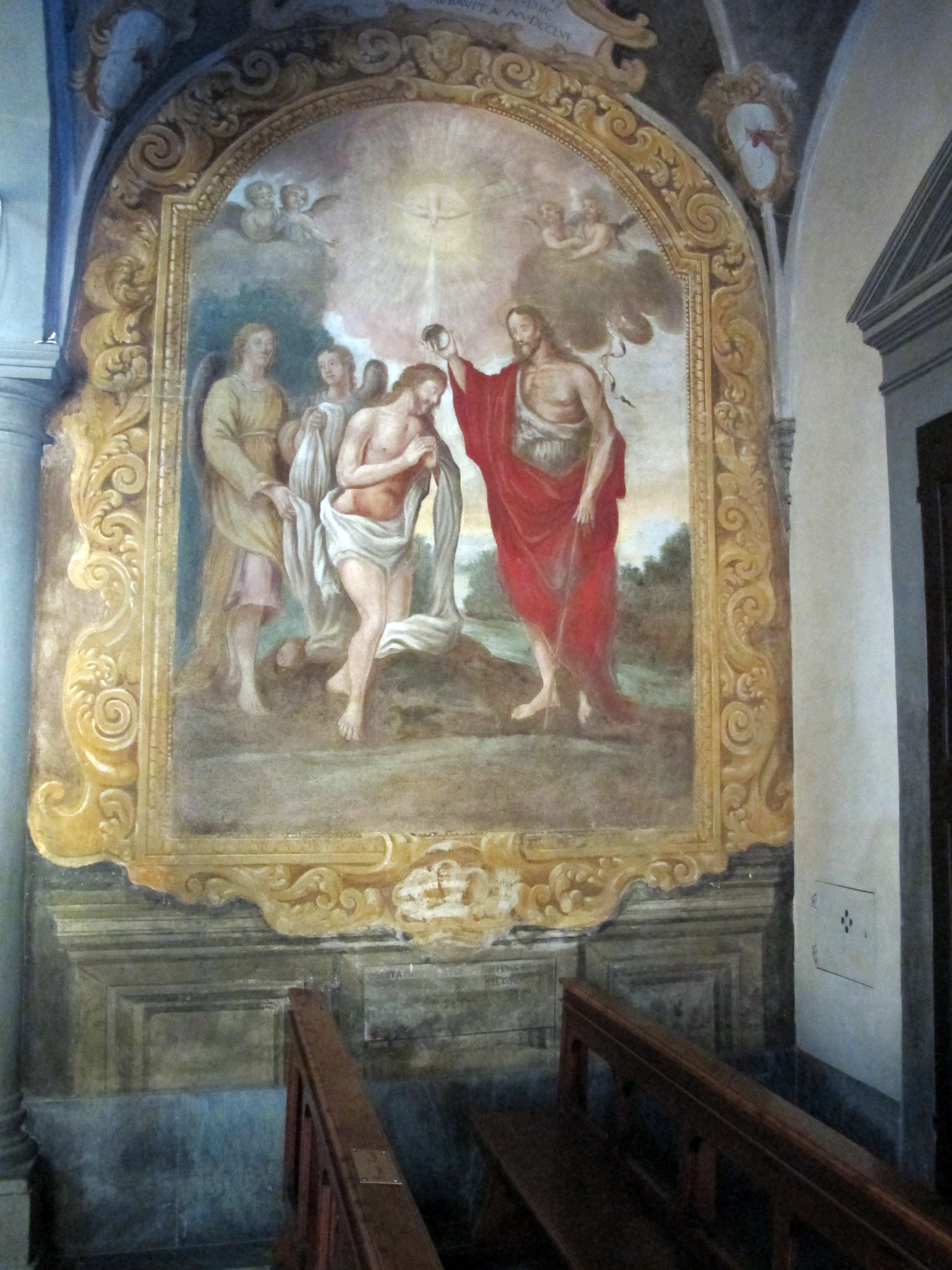
Fresco in Pieve di Santa Maria Novella, in Marti neighborhood of Montopoli, Tuscany

== Biography ==
Bamberini was born in Florence. He was a pupil of the painter Simone Pignoni, and most of his works were completed in Florence and surrounding towns. In 1710, he frescoed the cupola of the church of Santa Cristiana in Santa Croce sull'Arno, depicting the Assumption of the Virgin. The cloister was destroyed during World War Two, and the frescoes that could be rescued, depicting events in the life of St Francis, were reassembled.

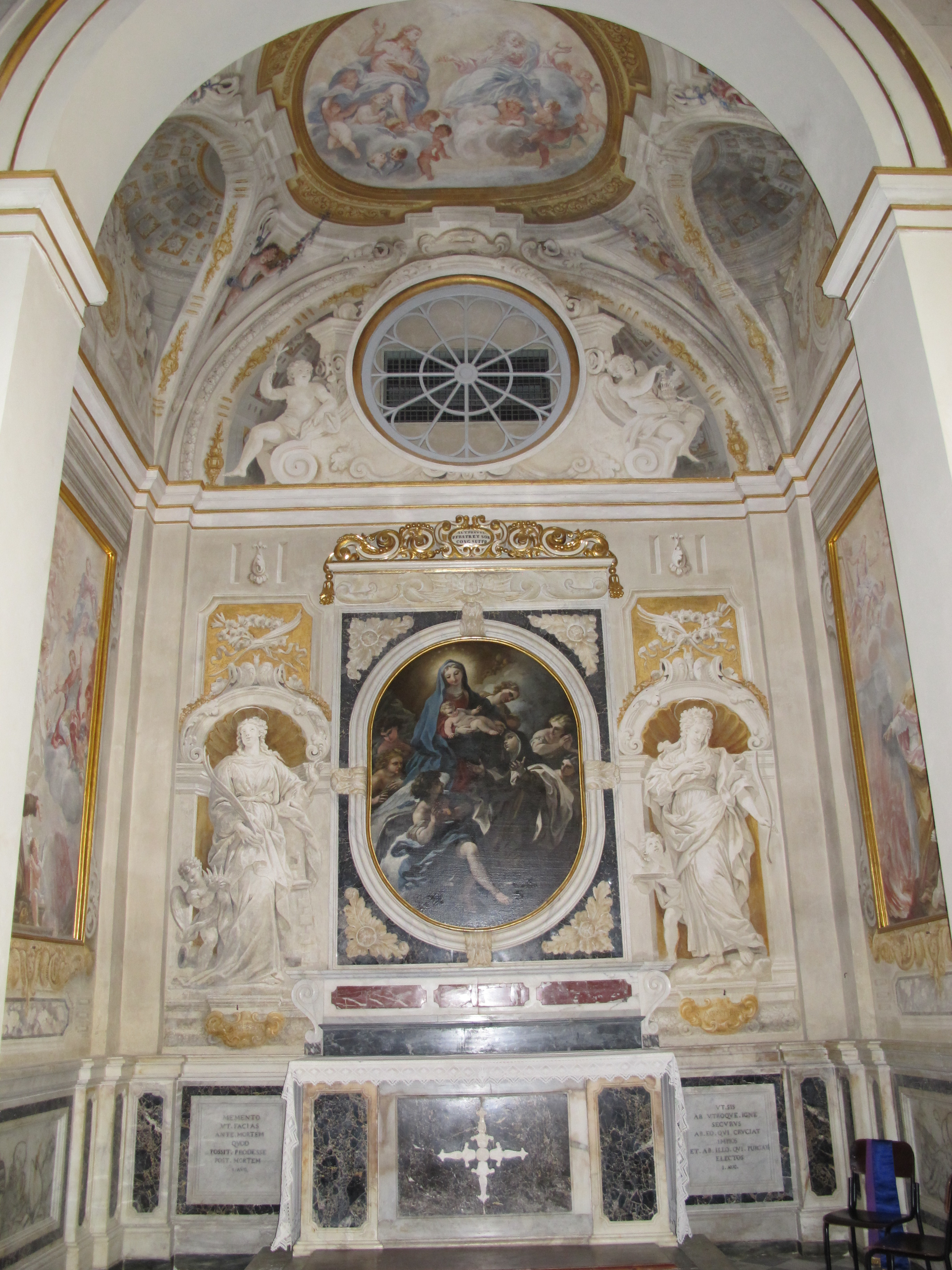
Frescoes in Duomo of San Miniato

In 1734–1735, along with Gaetano Castellani and Mauro Soderini, he frescoed the walls of the cloister of St Francis in San Casciano in Val di Pesa. The frescoes depict events in the Life of St Francis. He also helped decorate the presbytery (1719–1720) of the church of Santa Maria Novella of Marti, Italy.

Bamberini helped spearhead Baroque decorations in many churches in Pisa, including the Oratory of the Santissimi Crocifisso, the Cathedral, the Chapel of the Bishop's Palace, and in the Dominican Church of Saints James and Lucia.

Bamberini's self-portrait is part of Italian collections. He also frescoed the counterfacade, depicting the Madonna, Child, and Saints for the church of San Donato in the Comune of Terricciola. He also painted a Glory of St Augustine for the church of Santa Maria della Neve al Portico in Florence.

Bamberini died in Gramugnana, Lucca, in 1741.
