= Pramod Tandon =

Indian academic

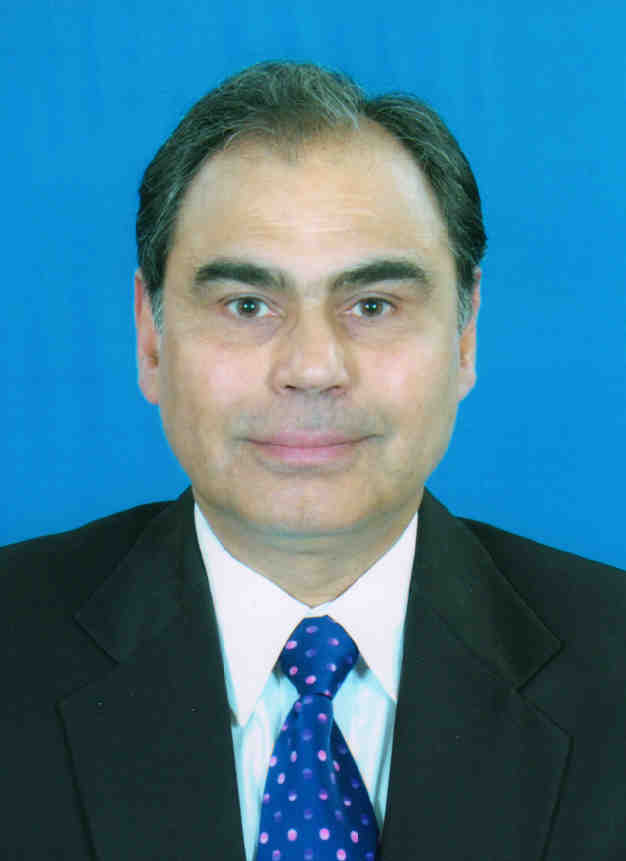
- Born: 6 October 1950 (age 75); Lucknow, Uttar Pradesh, India
- Occupation: Academic
- Spouse: Veena Tandon
- Children: 1

Pramod Tandon is an India Plant Biotechnologist and academic. He is a former Professor of Botany & Vice-Chancellor of North-Eastern Hill University (NEHU), Shillong and Chief Executive Officer of Biotech Park, Lucknow. The Government of India awarded him the fourth highest civilian honour Padma Sri in 2009, for his contributions to science.

== Early life and education ==
Tandon was born on 6 October 1950, at Lucknow. He received his BSc degree in 1969 and MSc (Botany) in 1971 from Lucknow University. He obtained his PhD from Jodhpur University in 1976. In 1977, he joined the North-Eastern Hill University as a lecturer and later rose to the position of Vice-Chancellor.

Tandon was awarded the National Scholarship for Study Abroad by Government of India and worked as a post-doctoral fellow in the Department of Molecular Biology and Biochemistry at the University of California, Irvine, US during 1978–79 and studied the genome organisation and expression of chloroplast DNA. From 1989 to 1995, the National Institute of Agro-biological Resources and several universities in Japan invited him for research work that led to a long-term collaboration on Plant Conservation Biotechnology.

== Personal life ==
Tandon is married to Veena Tandon, a parasitologist and former Professor of North-Eastern Hill University, Shillong, and they have a son, Prateek.

== Career ==
Tandon was Vice-Chancellor of NEHU from 2005 to 2010. Under his leadership, NEHU received the distinction of 'University with Potential for Excellence' being one amongst nine such universities in the country at that time, securing an 'A' grade through reaccreditation of the university by NAAC.

In addition to his position as Vice-Chancellor, Tandon helped in establishment of Rajiv Gandhi Indian Institute of Management, Shillong as its Project Director.

Tandon hosted the 96th Indian Science Congress at NEHU during January 2009.

Tandon served as a member of the National Advisory Council during 2010–14, where he worked extensively on development of northeastern region, a region facing many challenges including troubled history and geo-politics, environmental vulnerability and rough terrain, seclusion and insurgencies, poor infrastructure and weak governance, and limited connectivity.

Tandon's has made seminal contributions in micropropagation, re-establishment in nature, and recovery of critically endangered endemic plants of Northeast India. His most recent studies (2010–2015) focus on the genetic makeup of RET plants, including molecular and cytological basis of rarity of endangered plants that is useful in planning conservation strategies. Tandon has worked on biotechnological enhancement of Capsaicin biosynthesis in cell cultures of Capsicum chinense (Naga King Chilli - one of the hottest chillies of the world)

Tandon has published more than 200 research papers in journals and edited 4 books on biodiversity and biotechnology.

Tandon promoted entrepreneurship in biotechnology-based industry in Uttar Pradesh to assure benefits to society including training of tribal youth.

Tandon is a Fellow of the National Academy of Sciences, India, Indian Botanical Society, Indian Botanical Society, Linnean Society of London, and International Society of Environmental Botanists and served as a member of many Academic bodies and National Task Forces including Scientific Advisory Committee to the Cabinet, GOI.

== Awards ==
Tandon is the recipient of a number awards and recognitions, including:

- Padma Shri (2009) awarded by the President of India
- Award of Millennium Plaques of Honour (2008–2009) of Indian Science Congress Association, received from Hon’ble Prime Minister of India
- Prof. A.R. Chavan Memorial Lecture Award (2013) of the M.S. University of Baroda
- Biodiversity Lecture Award (2013) of National Academy of Sciences, India
- Prof. Saligram Sinha Memorial Lecture Award (2011) of the National Academy of Sciences, India
- Professor R.N. Tandon Memorial Lecture Award (2008) of the National Academy of Sciences, India
- Gadgil Memorial Lecture Award (2006) of Plant Tissue Culture Association of India (2006)
- Dr. T.N. Khoshoo Memorial Lecture Award (2006) of The Orchid Society of India
- Professor Panchanan Maheshwari Medal Award (2004) of Indian Botanical Society
- B.P. Pal National Environment Fellowship Award on Biodiversity (2002–2004), Ministry of Environment & Forests, Government of India
- Platinum Jubilee Lecture Award (2000) of Indian Science Congress Association
- Science and Technology Agency Research Award (1994 & 1995) for Foreign Scientists by Prime Minister's Office, Government of Japan
- National Scholarship for Study Abroad (1978 1980), Ministry of Education, Government of India
- Merit Scholarship (1965 1967) from U.P. Government
