= Arturo Falaschi =

Italian geneticist (1933–2010)

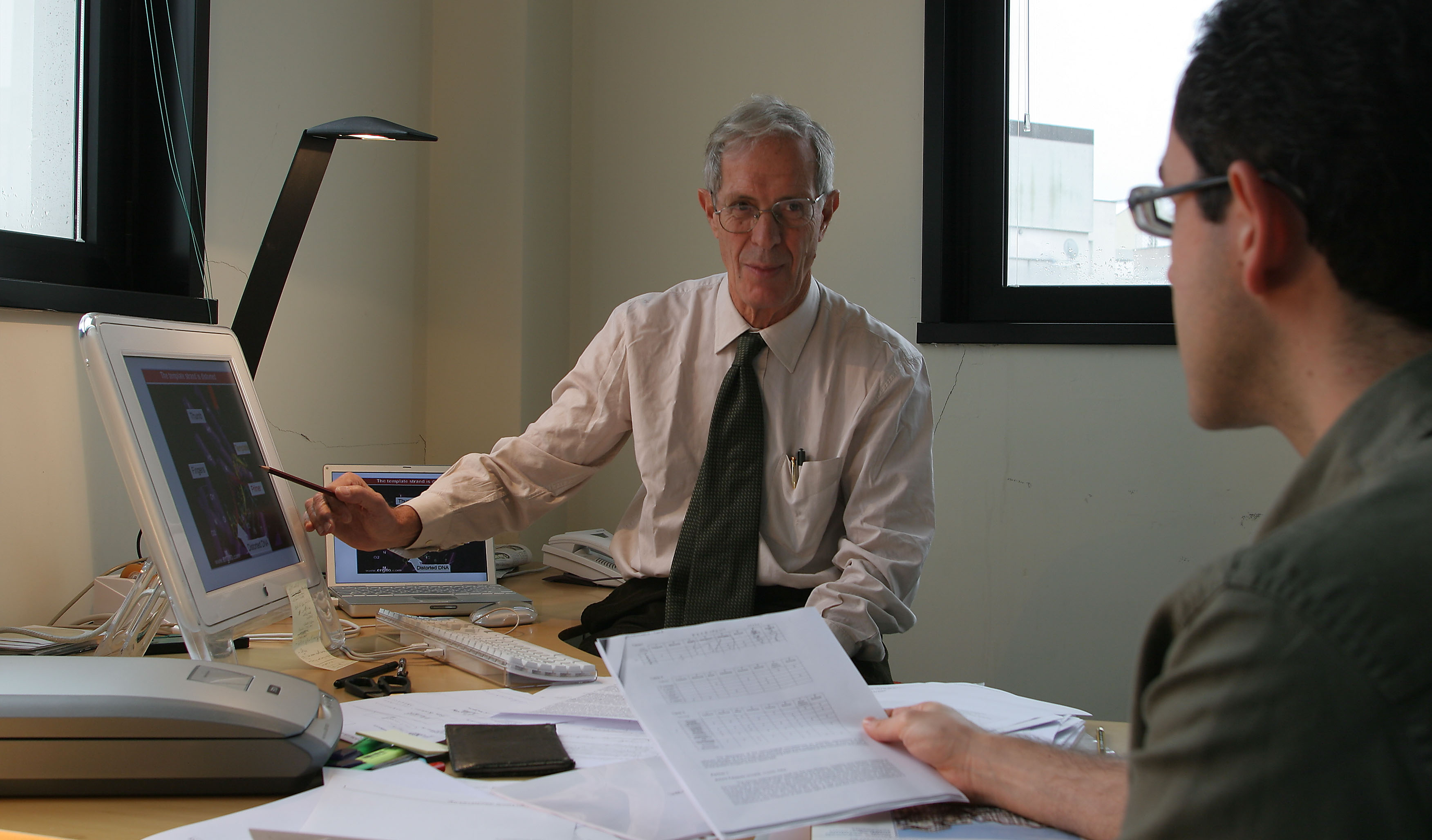
- Prof. Arturo Falaschi
- Born: 21 January 1933; Rome, Italy
- Died: 1 June 2010 (aged 77); Montopoli in Val D'Arno, Italy
- Education: University of Milan
- Known for: Work on the replication of DNA
- Awards: Gold Medal of the Benemeriti della scienza e della cultura of the Italian Republic
- Scientific career
- Fields: Genetics
- Institutions: University of Wisconsin; Stanford University; University of Pavia; Scuola Normale Superiore, Pisa
- Academic advisors: Har Gobind Khorana, Arthur Kornberg

Arturo Falaschi (21 January 1933, Rome – 1 June 2010, Montopoli in Val d'Arno) was an Italian geneticist.

== Biography ==
He graduated in Medicine in 1957 from University of Milan and undertook two post doctoral studies. Firstly, with J. Adler and Har Gobind Khorana in Wisconsin, USA (1961 to 1962), and later with Arthur Kornberg at Stanford (1962 to 1965). His main field of research was the replication of DNA. He was Professor of Molecular Biology at the University of Pavia (1966 to 1979); Director of the Instituto di Genetica Biochimica ed Evoluzionistica, CNR, Pavia (1970 to 1987); and Director of the Progetto Finalizzato "Ingegneria Genetica" of the Italian National Research Council (1982 to 1989). He taught Molecular Biology at the University of Pavia (1966 to 1979) and remained Director of Graduate School of Genetics, University of Pavia (1979 to 1984). He was coordinator of the Graduate School of Molecular Genetics, International School of Advanced Studies (SISSA), Trieste (1988 to 2001) and Professor of Molecular Biology, Scuola Normale Superiore (SNS), Pisa, Italy from 2004 to his last breath. He researched mainly in the field of DNA replication and in the last decades of his life he searched in particular the origin of replication of human DNA, discovering the first documented origin (Lamin B2 Origin).

As science administrator, he was responsible for the establishment of several research institutes and was a strong believer in the internationalization of science and an advocate of North-South collaboration. He was very articulate and convinced several governments in the developed and the developing world to establish a 2-component International Center for Genetic Engineering and Biotechnology, with one component in New Delhi, India and one in Trieste, Italy; both devoted to research and training of young researchers from the developing world. He became the first head of the Trieste Component of ICGEB (1987 to 1989) and then Director General of both components (1989 to 2004). In the pursuit of his desire to promote biotechnology and its applications in Asia, he became the Executive Director of the Asia Pacific Molecular Biology Network (2006 to 2009) and then Senior Counselor (2009-to date). He had profound influence on the work plan of A-IMBN and played a key role in the success of this organization.

== Honors ==
- Premio Scanno per l'innovazione tecnologica in 1982 and 1992.
- Vice-president of 'Comitato nazionale per le biotecnologie del Ministero per la ricerca scientifica e tecnologica' (since 1985)
- Member of the European science and technology assembly of European Union (since 1994),
- Member of Academia Europaea since 1997
- Member of the Academy of Sciences for the Developing World since 1997
- Member of the board of CNR since 1999
- President of the Council of scientists of Human Frontier Science Programme, since 1999.
- Gold Medal (Medaglia d'oro) and first class diploma (diploma di prima classe) of the Benemeriti della scienza e della cultura of the Italian Republic President, in 1998

=== Honors in memoriam ===
- Arturo Falaschi Hall in the Conservatorio Santa Chiara, San Miniato, Pisa
- Arturo Falaschi Hall at IGM Pavia
- ICGEB Headquarters entitled to the memory of prof. Arturo Falaschi
- The Arturo Falaschi Fellowship Programme: a programme of fellowship initiated by and subsequently dedicated to the memory of professor Arturo Falaschi
- The Arturo Falaschi Conference Series on Molecular Medicine A series of conferences on Molecular Medicine and Gene Therapy initiated by and subsequently entitled to the memory of prof. Arturo Falaschi.

== Publications ==
- Struttura e sintesi del DNA, Piccin, Padova, 1980
- The quest for a human ori, 'Genetica',1994;94(2-3):255-66.
- DNA. Storia di una scoperta, Editoriale Scienza, 1995
- Start sites of bidirectional DNA synthesis at the human lamin B2 origin, Science 2000 Mar 17;287(5460):2023-6.
