= Veena Tandon =

Indian parasitologist

- Born: 7 September 1949 (age 76); Kashipur, Uttarakhand, India
- Occupations: Parasitologist; Academic
- Years active: Since 1978
- Known for: Parasitology
- Spouse: Pramod Tandon
- Children: One son
- Awards: Padma Shri; E. K. Janaki Ammal Award; ISP Lifetime Achievement Award

Veena Tandon is an Indian parasitologist, academic and a NASI senior scientist at Biotech Park, Lucknow. She is a former professor of zoology at the North Eastern Hill University and serves as the chief instigator for the North-East India Helminth Parasite Information Database. She is known for her researches on worm infections afflicting the animals of food value and is the author of two books and several articles on parasitology.

The Government of India awarded her the fourth highest civilian honour of the Padma Shri, in 2016, for her contributions to science.

== Biography ==
Veena Tandon was born on 7 September 1949 in Kashipur in the Indian state of Uttarakhand. After graduating in zoology (BSc-hons) from Panjab University, Chandigarh in 1967, she completed her master's degree (MSc) in 1968 before securing a doctoral degree (PhD) from the same institution in 1973. She also did post doctoral research at the Department of Molecular Biology and Biochemistry of University of California, Irvine during 1978–79; her research topic being the adverse effect of alcohol on brain and liver tissues. She started her career as an assistant professor at Himachal Pradesh University but moved to the Department of Zoology of the North Eastern Hill University, Shillong, as an assistant professor where she served till her superannuation as a professor. After retirement, she joined Biotech Park, Lucknow to continue her helminthological researches on a platinum jubilee fellowship of the National Academy of Sciences, India and is the NASI senior scientist of the institution.

Tandon is known to have done pioneering research on parasites affecting livestock and her researches have been reported to have helped in the better understanding of parasite biodiversity of the northeast region of India. She is the principal investigator of the DIT - North-East Parasite Information Analysis Centre which is involved in the preparation of a North-East India Helminth Parasite Information Database (NEIHPID). Her researches have been documented by way of over 340 articles, many of them published in international peer reviewed journals. Besides, she has authored two books, Pictorial Guide to Trematodes of Livestock and Poultry in India and Bamboo Flowering and Rodent Control. She is also a co-author of the Northeast India Helminth Parasite Information Database (NEIHPID): Knowledge Base for Helminth Parasites, a database on the parasite biodiversity of the region, and has served as a member of the Scientific Advisory Committee to the Government of India as well as the Task Force on Biotechnology of the Department of Science and Technology.

Veena Tandon is married to Pramod Tandon, an educationist and a former vice chancellor of the North Eastern Hill University. The couple has a son, Prateek Tandon, who is a computer engineer and an author.

== Awards and honors ==
The National Academy of Sciences, India elected Tandon as a fellow in 1998 and she became an elected fellow of the Indian Society for Parasitology in 2005. She is also a fellow of the Zoological Society of India and the Helminthological Society of India and held the Chair in Taxonomy - Animal Sciences of the Ministry of Environment, Forest and Climate Change during 2003–06. She has delivered key note addresses in many science conferences and award orations such as Prof. R. P. Choudhuri Endowment Lecture of the Guwahati University, Prof. M. M. Chakravarty Commemoration Oration of the Zoological Society, Kolkata and Professor Archana Sharma Memorial Lecture of the National Academy of Sciences, India. She is a recipient of the E. K. Janaki Ammal Award in Animal Taxonomy of the Ministry of Environment and Forests and she received the Lifetime Achievement Award of the Indian Society for Parasitology in 2011. The Government of India awarded her the civilian honor of the Padma Shri in 2016.

== See also ==
- Pramod Tandon
