= Galluzzo =

Suburb of Florence

- Neighbourhood
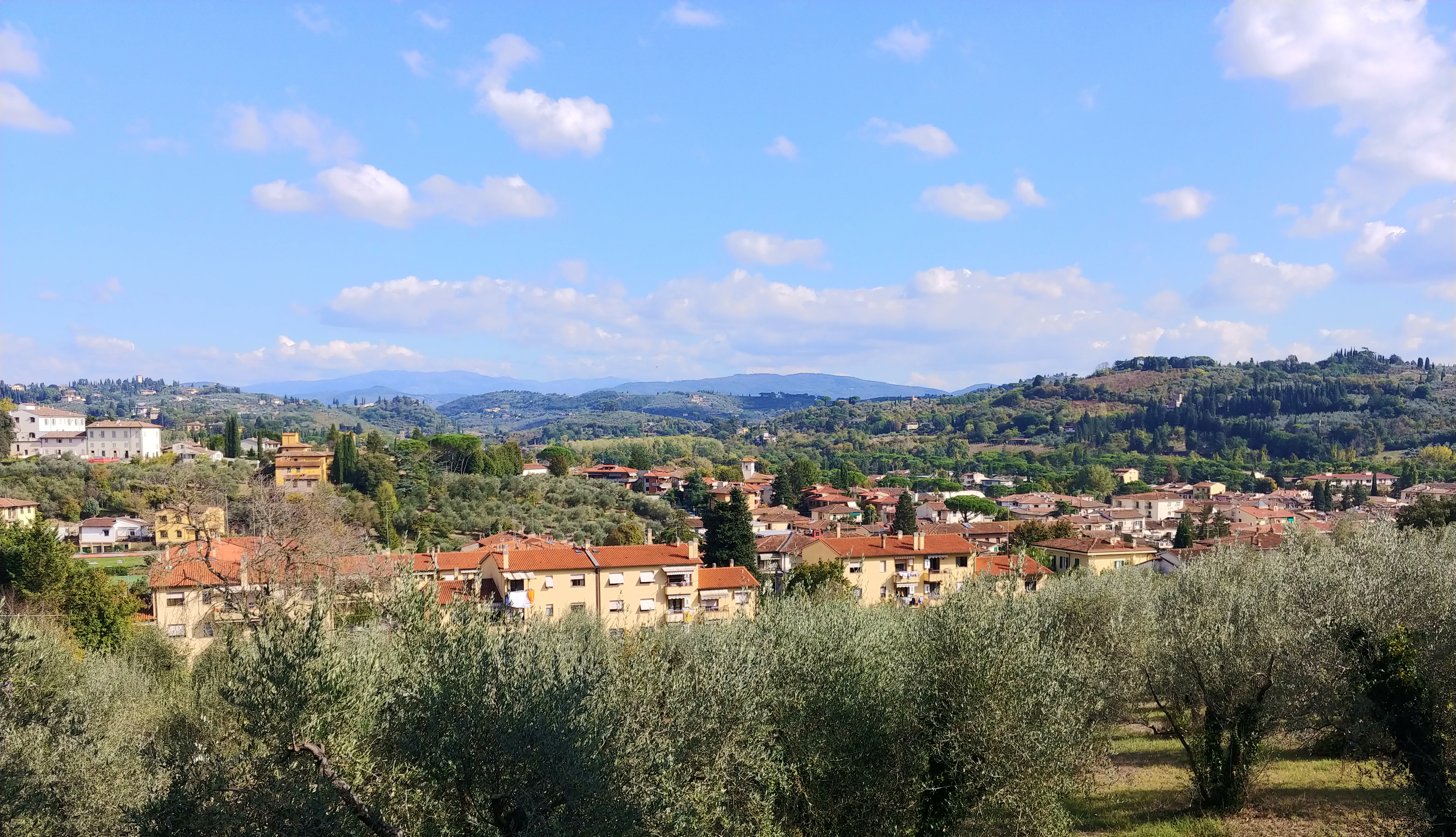
- Interactive map of Galluzzo
- Coordinates: 43.737°N 11.225°E
- Country: Italy
- Region: Tuscany
- Metropolitan city: Florence
- Comune: Florence
- Quarter: 3 (Gavinana-Galluzzo)
- Time zone: UTC+1 (CET)
  - Summer (DST): UTC+2 (CEST)

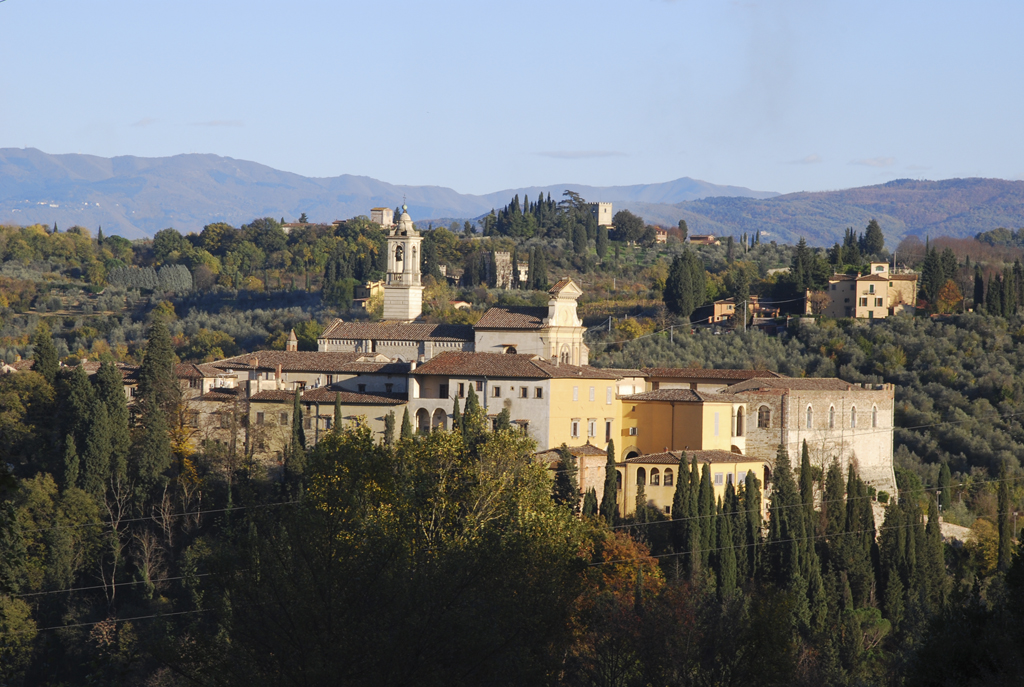
Galluzzo: Charterhouse.

Galluzzo is part of quartiere 3 of the Italian city of Florence, Italy, located in the southern extremity of the Florentine commune. It is known for the celebrated Carthusian monastery, the Galluzzo or Florence Charterhouse (Certosa di Firenze or Certosa del Galluzzo), which was founded in 1342 by Niccolò Acciaioli.

== History ==
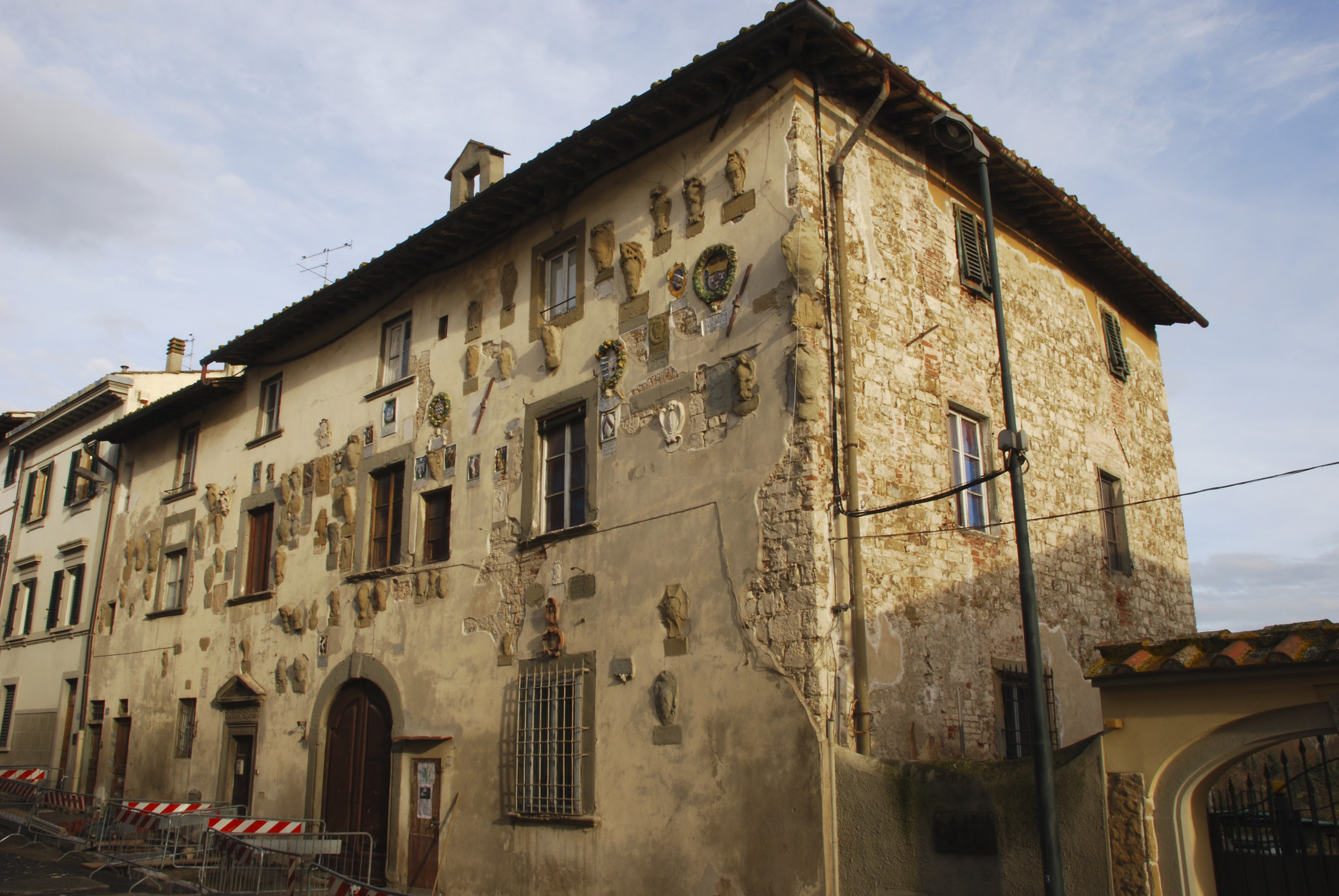
Galluzzo: the palace of Podestà.

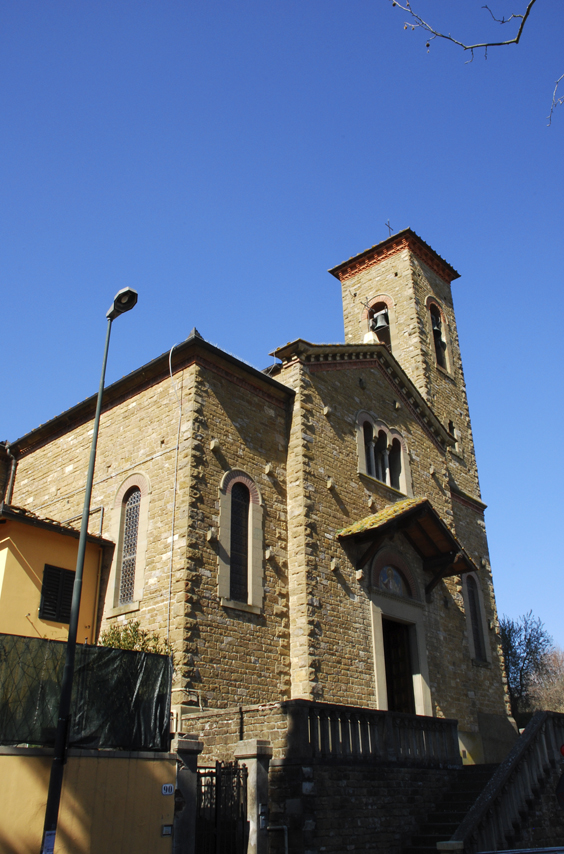
Galluzzo: the church of Santa Lucia.

=== The autonomous commune ===
Galluzzo was an autonomous commune until 1928, at which point its territory was split: part was assigned to the commune of Florence in accordance with the 2562nd Royal Decree (01/11/1928), which foresaw the expansion of the Florentine administrative territory (together with the fractions of San Felice ad Ema and Cascine del Riccio); the rest was assigned to the newly formed commune of Scandicci (known as Casellina e Torri until that same date) as the fraction of Giogoli; or to Bagno a Ripoli (Grassina). The remainder formed the present commune of Impruneta.

At the time in which the commune was disestablished, it had circa 22,000 inhabitants and was undoubtedly the most populated commune of the Florentine province, after Prato and Empoli; its communal territory bordered on those of Florence, Casellina e Torri, San Casciano in Val di Pesa, Greve in Chianti and Bagno a Ripoli. The commune, which at the time of national unification extended roughly 68 km^{2}, had already undergone a previous reduction in 1865, which with the 2412th Royal Decree (26 July 1865) had lost a strip of land between the city walls and Due Strade to the commune of Florence.

=== The name ===
Some trace the origin of the curious name (a variation of the word "gallo", cockerel) of the suburb to the Galluzzo or Galluzzi noble family, who were the regional "biadaioli", and whose crest was a golden cockerel in a blue field. Others maintain that the name Galluzzo derives from the old tavern located on the road leading to Rome from Florence (Via Cassia), whose sign was a cockerel. However, this sign was simply a reproduction of the carving of a cockerel on a milestone on the side of that same road. This latter hypothesis is more likely, given that even the historian Andrea Dei in his "Cronaca Senese" of 1253 states that "a company of armed Sienese and Pisans performed a quick raid into Florentine territory as far as the Galluzzo stone, and as a token of disrespect cut off the cockerel's head".

The late-13th-century suburb of Galluzzo Vecchio ("Old Galluzzo"), which originally must have consisted of a handful of houses and villas scattered between the charterhouse bridge and the church of Saint Lucia of Massapagani, expanded as a group of residential buildings starting from the corner of via Massapagani and via Barni, around a 14th-century church.

== Economy ==
Historically a zone inhabited by artisans and agricultural workers, Galluzzo had relatively few inhabitants until the mid-19th century. As far as the predominant activities are concerned, given its closeness to Impruneta, until the 16th century there was a consistent presence of terracotta producers, until more recent times when, in addition to kiln men, cement plants were built. At the beginning of the 20th century there was also a series of other industries which later disappeared, such as a large windmill next to a pasta factory, and a factory where olive oil was extracted by means of carbon sulphate, with which were also produced soaps of various types. The particular lithological composition of the surrounding hills also allowed for the construction of various caves for the extraction and processing of stone, the most important of which were those of Monteripaldi, Poggio ai Grilli and Montebuoni of Montecuccoli.

The women of the region had for a long time offered laundry services, given the abundance of running water, in addition to which they also produced straw plaits and braids.

Today, the heart of the residential nucleus is Acciaioli Square, in which is erected the monument to victims of World War I.

== Culture ==
Galluzzo is cited by Dante Alighieri in the XVI canto (verses 52–55) of The Divine Comedy.

Oh quando fora meglio esser vicine
quelle genti ch’io dico, ed al Galluzzo
ed a Trespiano aver vostro confine

— Dante Alighieri, Divine Comedy

== See also ==
- Florence Charterhouse – Carthusian monastery
- Santa Maria della Neve al Portico – Convent of Stigmatine Sisters
