= Castel del Bosco =

- Frazione
- Location of Castel del Bosco in Italy
- Coordinates: 43°40′1″N 10°42′00″E
- Country: Italy
- Region: Tuscany
- Province: Pisa (PI)
- Comune: Montopoli in Val d'Arno
- Elevation: 30 m (98 ft)

Population (2011)
  - Total: 859
- Demonym: Boschigiani
- Time zone: UTC+1 (CET)
  - Summer (DST): UTC+2 (CEST)
- Postal code: 56020
- Dialing code: (+39) 0571

Castel del Bosco is a village in Tuscany, central Italy, administratively a frazione of the comune of Montopoli in Val d'Arno, province of Pisa. At the time of the 2001 census its population was 666.

Castel del Bosco is about 35 km from Pisa and 3 km from Montopoli in Val d'Arno.
