= San Romano, Pisa =

San Romano
- Frazione
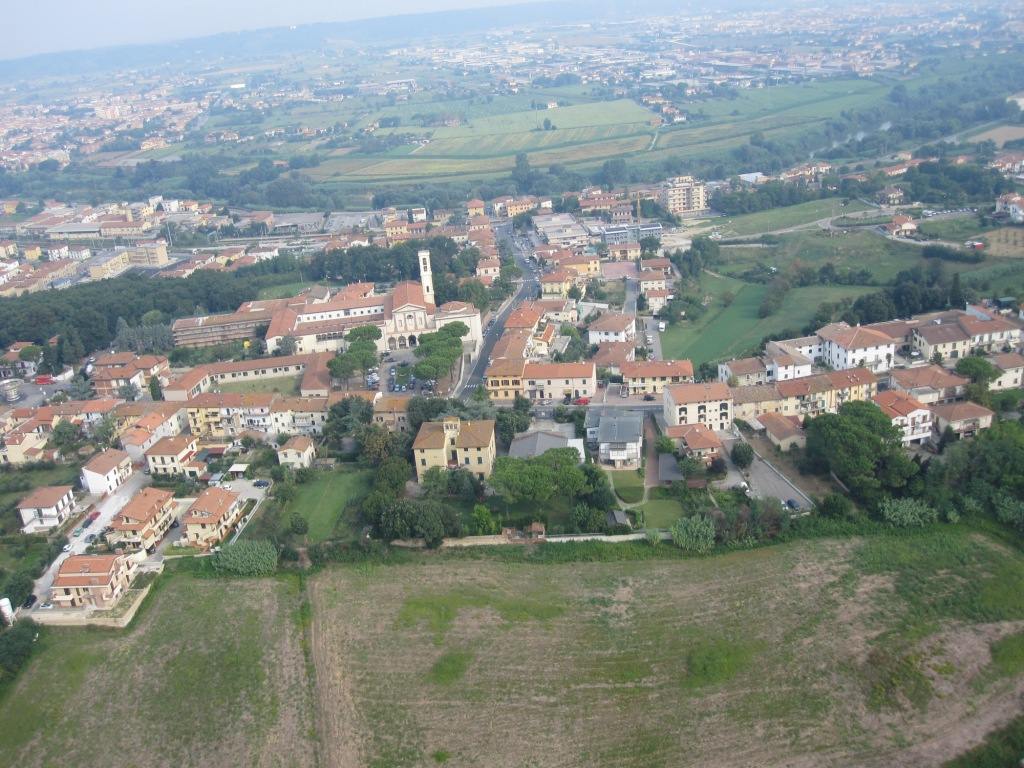
- An aerial view of San Romano

- Location of San Romano in Italy
- Coordinates: 43°46′28″N 10°43′16″E
- Country: Italy
- Region: Tuscany
- Province: Pisa (PI)
- Comune: Montopoli in Val d'Arno; San Miniato
- Elevation: 58 m (190 ft)

Population (2011)
  - Total: 5,116
- Time zone: UTC+1 (CET)
  - Summer (DST): UTC+2 (CEST)
- Postal code: 56020; 56028
- Dialing code: (+39) 0571

San Romano is a town in Tuscany, central Italy. It is administratively made up of two hamlets or frazioni of the same name belonging respectively to the municipality (comune) of Montopoli in Val d'Arno and that of San Miniato, province of Pisa. At the time of the 2001 census, its population was 4,417.

San Romano is about 38 km from Pisa, 3 km from Montopoli in Val d'Arno and 10 km from San Miniato.

The place is known for being the scene of the Battle of San Romano (1432), which was later depicted by Paolo Uccello in his celebrated set of three paintings bearing the same name.

== Main sights ==
- Sanctuary of the Madonna di San Romano
