= Santa Maria della Neve al Portico =

Church and convent in Florence, Italy

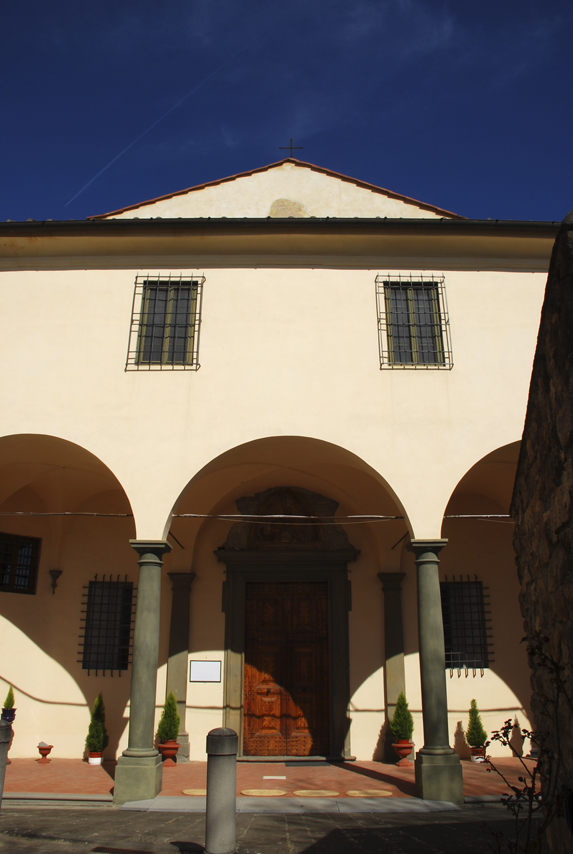
- Façade of the church.

Religion
- Affiliation: Roman Catholic
- Province: Florence

Location
- Location: Florence, Italy
- Interactive map of Santa Maria della Neve al Portico
- Coordinates: 43°44′38″N 11°13′49″E

Architecture
- Type: Church

Santa Maria della Neve al Portico is a Roman Catholic church and convent located on a rural site on Via del Podestà #86 in the suburban neighborhood of Galluzzo southeast of the urban center of Florence, Italy. It remains a monastery and is also known as the Convento Il Portico and now houses the Istituti Religiosi Femminili Suore Stimmatine.

== History ==
The first documentation of the monastery is from 1240, when an eremitic female Augustinian monastery was founded at the site. In 1340, documents confirm that Bishop Francesco da Cingoli, with the posthumous endowment by Benvenuta di Duccio, widow of Francesco Morelli di Candeli, had granted funds to build a proper monastery on this site that was near the Strada Romana. First dedicated to Santa Maria della Disciplina, the convent continued to grow and add decorations over the centuries. In 1529, during the siege of Florence, the nuns were forced to abandon the monastery and take shelter in the city, and returned to a buildings heavily vandalized by the imperial troops.

A new church was begun in 1696 on the west side of the convent. Previously the old church had an enclosed interior second story choir that separated the nuns from the visiting faithful, this was moved to an external loggia. The church was reconsecrated in 1705 as Santa Maria della Neve, in memory of a putatively miraculous summer snowfall that occurred on 15 August 1702. Following the suppression of religious orders in the late 18th-century, the site became a public school and conservatory. In 1852, it was returned to the religious authorities and made the motherhouse of the order of the Suore Stimmatine or also Povere Figlie delle Sacre Stimmate di San Francesco d'Assisi (Stigmatine Sisters or Poor Daughters of the Holy Stigmata of Saint Francis).

The new church has a frescoed ceiling depicting a Glory of St Augustine by Antonio Domenico Bamberini. The main Altarpieces depicts the Madonna and Child granting the belt to St Augustine and St Monica by Pietro Dandini. Above the nave wall is a crucifix (1340-1360) flanked by two frescoes (1700) depicting the Madonna Addolorata and St John Evangelist. The church has a late-gothic style fresco, likely from the old church, depicting the Apparition of the Virgin before a praying St Bernard flanked by the Archangel Raphael and St Nicola di Bari. In the former refectory of the monastery is a fresco depicting the Last Supper (circa 1520) attributed to Ridolfo del Ghirlandaio. The old church, adjacent to the former cemetery of the nuns, has the old church with two small canvases (1470-1471) by Bicci di Lorenzo.
