= Montopoli in Val d'Arno =

- Comune
- Comune di Montopoli in Val d'Arno
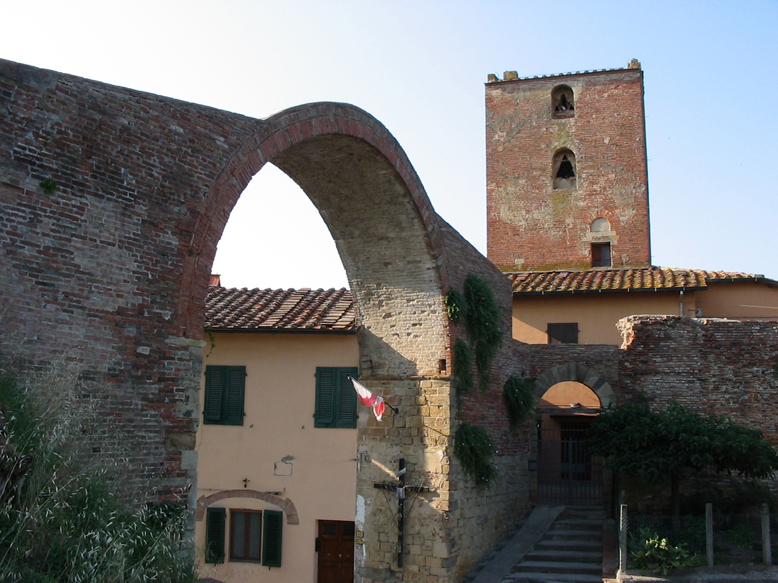
- Arch and Tower of Castruccio Castracani.

- Coat of arms

- Location within Italy Location within Tuscany
- Coordinates: 43°40′N 10°45′E
- Country: Italy
- Region: Tuscany
- Province: Pisa (PI)
- Frazioni: Capanne, Castel del Bosco, Marti, San Romano

Government
  - Mayor: Alessandra Vivaldi

Area
  - Total: 29.9 km^{2} (11.5 sq mi)
- Elevation: 98 m (322 ft)

Population (2008)
  - Total: 11,012
  - Density: 368/km^{2} (954/sq mi)
- Demonym: Montopolesi
- Time zone: UTC+1 (CET)
  - Summer (DST): UTC+2 (CEST)
- Postal code: 56020
- Dialing code: 0571
- Website: Official website

Montopoli in Val d'Arno is a comune (municipality) in the Province of Pisa in the Italian region Tuscany, located about 40 kilometres (25 mi) southwest of Florence and about 30 kilometres (19 mi) east of Pisa.

Montopoli in Val d'Arno borders the following municipalities: Castelfranco di Sotto, Palaia, Pontedera, San Miniato, Santa Maria a Monte.

It is home to a tower and an arch named after Castruccio Castracani, once belonging to a castle. Outside of town is the Franciscan Sanctuary of the Madonna di San Romano and the parish church of Santa Maria Novella.

== Notable people ==
- Arturo Falaschi (1933–2010), geneticist, died in Montopoli in Val d'Arno

== Twin towns ==
- Torella dei Lombardi, Italy
- Maussane-les-Alpilles, France
