= Hyaluronate lyase =

Class of enzymes

hyaluronate lyase

Identifiers
- EC no.: 4.2.2.1
- CAS no.: 37259-53-3

Databases
- IntEnz: IntEnz view
- BRENDA: BRENDA entry
- ExPASy: NiceZyme view
- KEGG: KEGG entry
- MetaCyc: metabolic pathway
- PRIAM: profile
- PDB structures: RCSB PDB PDBe PDBsum
- Gene Ontology: AmiGO / QuickGO
Search
- PMC: articles
- PubMed: articles
- NCBI: proteins

The enzyme hyaluronate lyase (EC 4.2.2.1) catalyzes the chemical reaction

Cleaves hyaluronate chains at a β-D-GalNAc-(1→4)-β-D-GlcA bond, ultimately breaking the polysaccharide down to 3-(4-deoxy-β-D-gluc-4-enuronosyl)-N-acetyl-D-glucosamine

This enzyme belongs to the family of lyases, specifically those carbon-oxygen lyases acting on polysaccharides. The systematic name of this enzyme class is hyaluronate lyase. Other names in common use include hyaluronidase (ambiguous), (hyalurononglucosaminidase) (ambiguous), (hyaluronoglucuronidase)], glucuronoglycosaminoglycan lyase, spreading factor, and mucinase (ambiguous).

== Structural studies ==
As of late 2007, 27 structures have been solved for this class of enzymes, with PDB accession codes 1C82, 1EGU, 1F1S, 1F9G, 1I8Q, 1LOH, 1LXK, 1LXM, 1N7N, 1N7O, 1N7P, 1N7Q, 1N7R, 1OJM, 1OJN, 1OJO, 1OJP, 1W3Y, 2BRP, 2BRV, 2BRW, 2C3F, 2DP5, 2PK1, 2YVV, 2YW0, and 2YX2.
