= Capanne, Montopoli in Val d'Arno =

Capanne
- Frazione
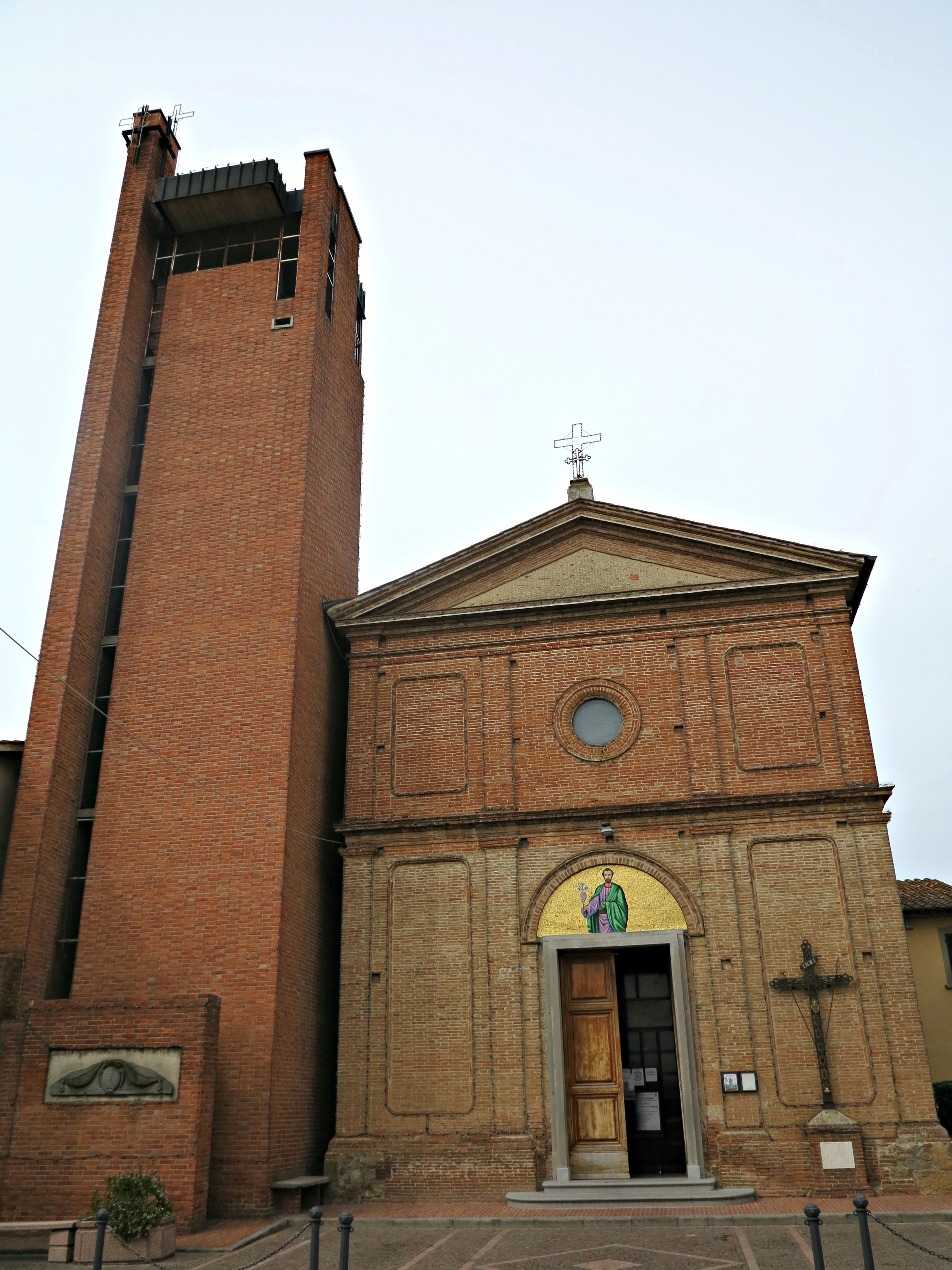
- The church of San Giuseppe in Capanne

- Location of Capanne in Italy
- Coordinates: 43°40′35″N 10°44′9″E
- Country: Italy
- Region: Tuscany
- Province: Pisa (PI)
- Comune: Montopoli in Val d'Arno
- Elevation: 43 m (141 ft)

Population
  - Total: 2,635
- Demonym: Capannesi
- Time zone: UTC+1 (CET)
  - Summer (DST): UTC+2 (CEST)
- Postal code: 56020
- Dialing code: (+39) 0571

Capanne is a village in Tuscany, central Italy, administratively a frazione of the comune of Montopoli in Val d'Arno, province of Pisa. At the time of the 2006 parish census its population was 2,635.

Capanne is about 36 km from Pisa and 3 km from Montopoli in Val d'Arno.
