= National Advisory Council (India) =

Advisory body, 2004–2014

Agency overview
- Formed: 4 June 2004
- Dissolved: 25 May 2014
- Jurisdiction: India
- Headquarters: New Delhi
- Agency executive: Sonia Gandhi, Chairperson

The National Advisory Council (NAC) was an advisory body set up by the first United Progressive Alliance (UPA) government in 2004 to advise the Prime Minister of India, Manmohan Singh.

Sonia Gandhi served as its chairperson for much of the tenure of the UPA government. Its aim was to assist the Prime Minister in achieving and monitoring missions and goals.

== History ==
The NAC was set up on 4 June 2004 by prime minister Manmohan Singh, during the tenure of the first UPA government.

== Organization (2010–2014) ==
The NAC - II consisted of a mix of activists, bureaucrats, economists, politicians and industrialists:

- Sonia Gandhi - Chairperson
- Mihir Shah - Member, Planning Commission
- Narendra Jadhav - Member and former bureaucrat, Planning Commission
- Ashis Mondal - Director of Action for Social Advancement (ASA), Bhopal
- Prof. Pramod Tandon - Vice Chancellor, North Eastern Hill University
- Deep Joshi - social activist
- Farah Naqvi - social activist
- Dr. N. C. Saxena - former bureaucrat
- Anu Aga - businessperson
- A. K. Shiva Kumar - economist
- Mirai Chatterjee - Coordinator, SEWA, Ahmedabad

The members who served on the NAC and later resigned are

- Aruna Roy - former bureaucrat
- Prof. M.S. Swaminathan - agricultural scientist and MP
- Dr. Ram Dayal Munda - MP
- Jean Dreze - development economist
- Harsh Mander - author, columnist, researcher, teacher, and social activist
- Madhav Gadgil - ecologist
- Jayaprakash Narayan (Lok Satta)- former bureaucrat

== Drafting bills ==
The NAC was responsible for the drafting of several key bills passed by both UPA governments, including the Right to Information Act, Right to Education Act, MNREGA, and the Food Security Bill.

== Criticisms ==
The concept of a NAC has been criticized by opposition parties and some scholars as not being in keeping with India's constitution, describing it as an alternative cabinet. The NAC also finalized draft recommendations for a mandatory pre-legislative consultative process which led some to believe that constituted members of parliament are less important. It was criticized by some scholars for drafting the communal violence bill in 2011, stating that it will "exacerbate communalism" and destroy "the foundations of our federal structure". The NAC was also accused of exercising an outsized influence over the central government. The council ceased to exist when the BJP government took office after the 2014 Indian general elections.

== See also ==
- National Integration Council
