= N. C. Saxena =

Indian civil servant

Naresh Chandra Saxena
- Education: Allahabad University; University of Oxford
- Occupations: Member, NAC
- Spouse: Naomi Saxena
- Children: Jhilmil Breckenridge

Naresh Chandra Saxena is an Indian bureaucrat who served as a member of the Planning Commission of India.

== College ==
After going to Allahabad University for his first master's in physics while still in his teens, he went on to earn a doctorate in forestry from University of Oxford in 1992. He was awarded honorary Ph.D from the University of East Anglia (UK) in 2006.

== Career ==
Saxena is a former IAS officer. He served as a member of the National Advisory Council.

After his first inclination of teaching, in the early 1960s went poorly, due to groupism’, ‘casteism’ and ‘dirty politics’ in teaching, he went to the Union Public Service Commission (UPSC) examination in 1963. When the results were announced for the UPSC examinations, on 4 April 1964, his senior, RS Gupta, told him, despite how his interview went, Saxena had topped the IAS examination at the all India level. Saxena was so surprised, that he went to a Newspaper, where they announced the top 10 civil services examination scores were posted, to confirm the news. He was the youngest to join the 1964 batch at Lal Bahadur Shastri National Academy of Administration, at the age of 22. After graduation, he believed in continued studies, and started publishing papers through journals and newspapers, through his various postings over 15 years. In 1980, he became Secretary, Land Reforms Department, in Uttar Pradesh. He had various different ideas, some of which were shot down.

From 1985 to 1987, he was Joint Secretary in Union Ministry of Environment and Forests, and following this posting, he went to Oxford to get a Doctorate in Forestry, between 1989 and 1992.

He headed a planning commission panel on rural poor and recommended rank-based system including automatic inclusion and exclusion of poor families.

On 16 August 2010, a committee headed by him warned that plans by Vedanta Resources to mine on Dongria Kondh land in eastern India threaten the survival of the tribe. This led to the Indian government refusing clearance to the project.

As a Consultant with UNICEF, UNDP, and various other organisations, to help raise awareness for Social Issues, like Climate Change, and how it affects India. He has written over 200 reports. on Social issues, on topics like Forest Management, to how Government Policy and Administration impact the poverty scheme. He has also written a few articles for the Newspaper, the Economic and Political Weekly.

== Books ==
In 2019, he wrote a book titled, What Ails the IAS and Why It Fails to Deliver. A look inside the IAS, and how it can be improved. A list of other books he has either written himself, or written with others:

- To the Hands of the Poor, Written mainly by Robert Chambers, but N. C. Saxena, and Tushaar Shah were editors.
- India's eucalyptus craze, completely written by N.C. Saxena
- Land Subsidence, written by B. Singh, N.C. Saxena
- Mine Closures written by N.C. Saxena
- What Ails the IAS and Why it Fails to Deliver
