= Virander Singh Chauhan =

Indian scientist

- Born: 3 March 1950 (age 76); India
- Occupation: Scientist
- Years active: Since 1979
- Awards: Padma Shri; Dr. MOT Iyengar Memorial Award; Ranbaxy Research Award; Om Prakash Bhasin Award; ICMR Basanti Devi Amir Chand Prize; Raj Kristo Dutt Memorial Award; BioSpectrum Person of the Year Award

Virander Singh Chauhan is an Indian scientist and a Rhodes Scholar working in the fields of genetic engineering and biotechnology. He is known for his contributions to the development of a recombinant vaccine for malaria. and for synthetic structural peptides with biological functions. He was honored by the Government of India in 2012 with the fourth highest Indian civilian award of Padma Shri. He is the present Chancellor of the Gandhi Institute of Technology and Management.

== Biography ==
Virander Singh Chauhan, born on 3 March 1950, graduated in Chemistry (BSc) from the University of Delhi in 1969 and secured his post graduation (MSc) from the same university in 1971. His career started as the faculty member of Chemistry at the St. Stephen's College, Delhi and continued his research at Delhi University. In 1974, he obtained a Ph.D., after which he moved to Oxford University, on temporary leave from the college, on a Rhodes Scholarship where he stayed till 1977. At Oxford he obtained his D.Phil. in chemistry in 1977.On his return from Oxford, he resumed his duties at St. Stephen's College where he worked till 1979. In between, he had a brief stay of one year as a post doctoral fellow at the University of Georgia during 1977-78.

In 1979, Chauhan joined the Indian Institute of Technology, Kanpur as an Assistant Professor and returned to Delhi University in 1982 as the Reader of the Department of Chemistry. In 1986, he was promoted as the Professor and worked there till 1988. Resigning from the university, Chauhan joined the International Centre for Genetic Engineering and Biotechnology (ICGEB), a non profit research organization under the aegis of United Nations Industrial Development Organization as senior scientist and was entrusted the leadership of the workgroup involved in the research on Malaria. In 1998, he was appointed as the Director of the institute, a post he held till 2014.[5] Besides academic achievements Chauhan was also an outstanding athlete who represented Delhi University and Oxford University in Athletics and Cross-Country running. Chauhan continued his research at ICGEB as a DBT distinguished biotechnology professor fellow, JC Bose fellow and Arturo Falaschi Fellow till the end of 2022.

== Positions ==
Virander Chauhan was the secretary of the Indian arm of Rhodes Scholarships UK and is a member of the selection committees of such as Inlaks, Felix and Dr. Manmohan Singh scholarships. Chauhan has been on the selection committees for the last 42 years without a break. A former president of the Society of Biological Chemists during 2009-2011, Chauhan is an elected member (1992) of all the three National Academies of Sciences including the Indian National Science Academy (INSA), National Academy of Sciences (NASI), and Indian Academy of Sciences (IAS) as well as Guha Research Conference and The World Academy of Sciences TWAS. He has served as the president of Indian Peptide Society and as a member of scientific institutions such as New York Academy of Sciences, American Society of Microbiology, Indian Biophysical Society and Indian Immunology Society. [4] Chauhan was deeply involved in the establishment of several prestigious government funded institutions including Translational Health Science and Technology Institute (THSTI), Regional Centre for Biotechnology (RCB), National Institute of Biomedical Genomics (NIBMG), Centre for DNA Fingerprinting and Diagnostics (CDFD), National Agri-Food Biotechnology Institute (NABI). He has been the member of the governing council of the MS Swaminathan Research Foundation (MSSRF), the Inter-University Centre for Astronomy and Astrophysics (IUCAA), Chairman of governing board of the L V Prasad Eye Institute (LVPEI), the International Clinical Epidemiology Network (INCLEN), the Inter-University Accelerator Centre (IUAC).

He has been a member of the executive councils of Jawaharlal Nehru University, Delhi and the Department of Biotechnology (DBT) for their Indo-US Vaccine Action Programme. He has also been a part of other initiatives by Department of Biotechnology, Rotaviral Diarrhoea Vaccine Product Development Project and Molecular Biophysics and Biochemistry Programme and has served as the part-time chairman of Bharat Immunologicals and Biologicals Corporation Limited, a vaccine manufacturing company under DBT.

Chauhan has been associated with international bodies such as the World Health Organization (WHO) as the member of the Expert Advisory Panel on Vaccines and Biological Standards, International Union of Biochemistry and Molecular Biology (IUBMB) and Asia-Pacific International Molecular Biology Network (A-IMBN), South Korea, as a member of their Technical Research Groups. He has also been a part of the editorial boards of several national and international journals like International Journal of Biomedical Science, Journal of Biomedicine and Biotechnology, Journal of Peptide Science, Asian Biotechnology and Development Review, Pakistan Journal of Biological Sciences, Indian Journal for Biochemistry and Biophysics, Journal of Molecular Structure and The Open Vaccine Journal. The Fruiteries of Immunology.

His many other national responsibilities include member of University Grants Commission (UGC) for two terms, Acting Chairman of University Grants Commission (UGC) for one year (2017) as well as the Chairman of the Executive Council of the National Assessment and Accreditation Council (NAAC), Government of India. Chauhan was also the Chairman of the Academic Committee of the 7th pay Commission, Government of India and was responsible for major reforms both at the UGC and NAAC. He is also an independent director of the Higher Education Financing Agency (HEFA) since its inception. He is also the Chairman of the Governing Council of the Sun Pharma Research Foundation.

== Legacy ==
Virander Chauhan was the leader of the workgroup engaged in the development of a vaccine during his early years in the International Centre for Genetic Engineering and Biotechnology. His team is known to have developed a recombinant vaccine, the first time such vaccine developed entirely in India, which is now in its clinical trials stage. His research has also assisted in the understanding of artemisinin and chloroquine, drugs used in the treatment of Malaria. It is also reported to have helped in the development of high throughput screens for the discovery of drugs for Malaria. He has also done research on conformationally defined Peptides, which is of significance for developing antibiotic peptides as well as anti-fibrillizing structures (anti amyloids) that may help in finding treatment protocols for diseases like HIV and Diabetes mellitus type 2. The work has also led to the formation of nanostructures to be used as biomolecular delivery agents.

Virander Singh Chauhan is known to have guided over 50 research students and is credited with over 300 research papers, published in peer reviewed international journals. His papers are also featured on known research databases such as Microsoft Academic Search, PubFacts and Pubget. He has also delivered keynote addresses at many seminars and conferences, workshops and convocations at several universities.

== Awards and recognitions ==
Virander Chauhan, a Rhodes Scholar of 1974 and a Fellow of the Academy of Sciences for the Developing World (TWAS), received Dr. MOT Iyengar Memorial Award from the Indian Council of Medical Research (ICMR) in 1995. This was followed by Ranbaxy Research Award in 2001, Om Prakash Bhasin Award in 2002 and ICMR Basanti Devi Amir Chand Prize in 2003. He is also a recipient of Raj Kristo Dutt Memorial Award of the Indian Science Congress Association in 2010 and the BioSpectrum Person of the Year Award in 2011. In 2012, the Government of India awarded him the civilian honor of Padma Shri. He also holds the Fellowships of Indian Academy of Sciences, National Academy of Sciences, India, and Indian Society for Parasitology.

== See also ==
- Recombinant vaccine
- Malaria
- International Centre for Genetic Engineering and Biotechnology
- National Academy of Agricultural Sciences
