= Borgo Capanne =

- Frazione

- Location of Borgo Capanne in Italy
- Coordinates: 44.13295°N 10.97397°E
- Country: Italy
- Region: Emilia-Romagna
- Metropolitan city: Bologna (BO)
- Comune: Alto Reno Terme
- Time zone: UTC+1 (CET)
  - Summer (DST): UTC+2 (CEST)

Borgo Capanne is a village which is part of the municipality of Alto Reno Terme in the province of Bologna in Italy. The village is located at an altitude of 615 m.
