= Central Drug Research Institute =

Research laboratory in Lucknow, India

Coordinates: 26.8602°N 80.9309°E

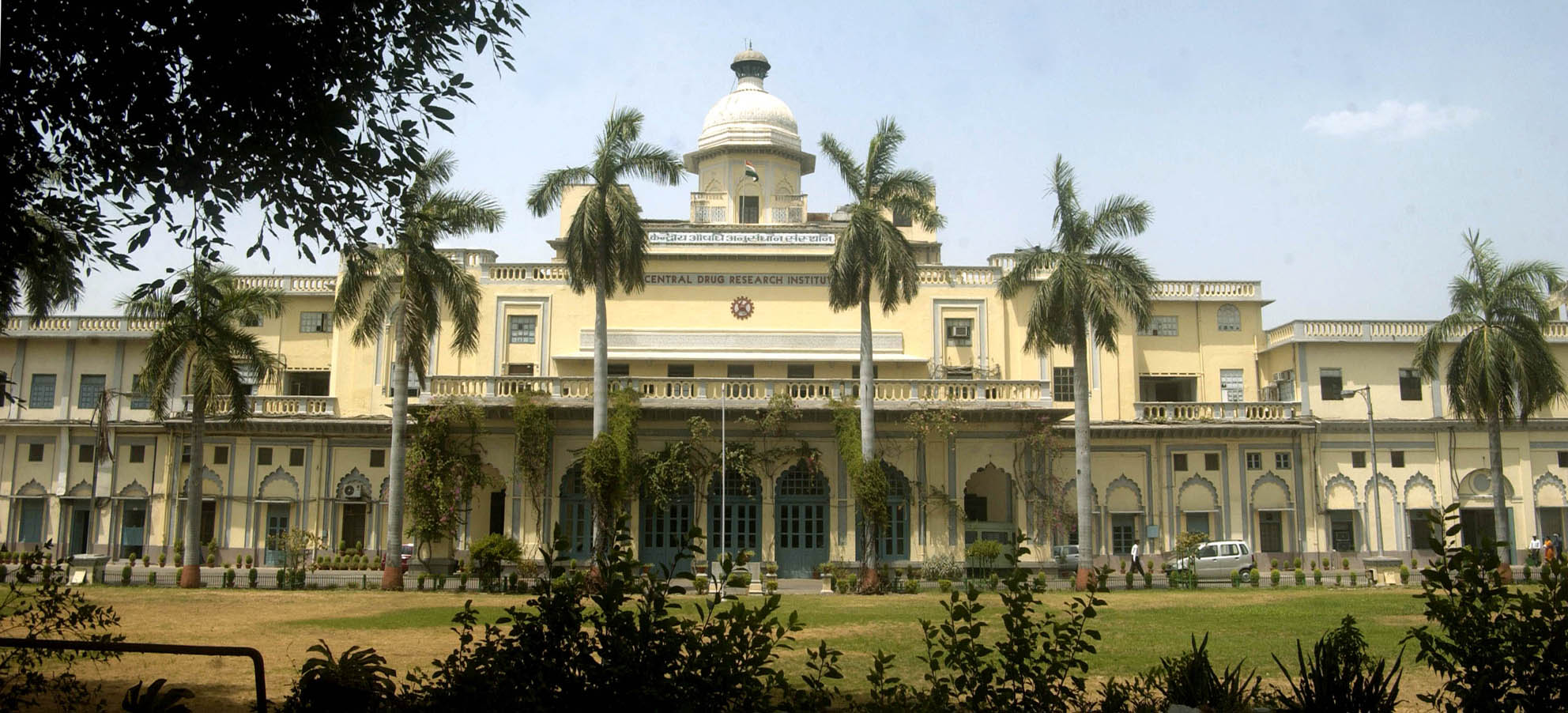
- Type: Government
- Established: 1951; 75 years ago
- Academic affiliation: CSIR
- Budget: ₹700 crore (US$73 million) (2021–2022)
- Director: Dr. Radha Rangarajan
- Location: Lucknow, Uttar Pradesh, India
- Campus: Urban
- Website: http://www.cdri.res.in/

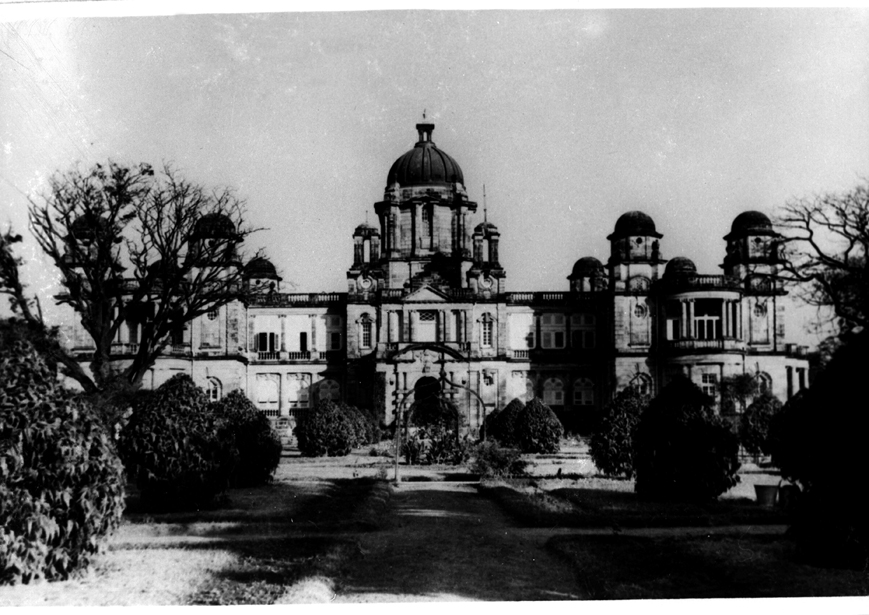
Chattar Manzil in 1951

Central Drug Research Institute is a multidisciplinary research laboratory in Lucknow, India, employing scientific personnel from various areas of biomedical sciences.

== History ==
The Central Drug Research Institute is one of the first laboratories to be established in India right after its independence. It is among the thirty nine laboratories that are functioning under the aegis of the Council of Scientific and Industrial Research of India. The research institute was formally inaugurated on 17 February 1951 by the prime minister, Jawahar Lal Nehru.

== Divisions ==
For administrative and scientific purposes the institute's manpower has been grouped into 17 research and development divisions and several divisions providing technical and scientific support. The following divisions of are involved in research and development:

- Division of Biochemistry
- Division of Botany
- Clinical and Experimental Medicine
- Division of Cancer Biology
- Division of Endocrinology
- Fermentation Technology
- Medicinal and Process Chemistry
- Division of Microbiology
- Division of Neuroscience and Aging Biology
- Division of Parasitology
- Division of Pharmaceutics
- Division of Pharmacokinetics and Metabolism
- Division of Pharmacology
- Division of Toxicology
- Division of Laboratory Animals

In addition, two data centers and one field station located outside the research institute provide operational support.

== Achievements ==
- Centchroman/Ormeloxifene
