= International Centre for Genetic Engineering and Biotechnology =

UNIDO project

- Logo of ICGEB
- Established: 1983; 43 years ago
- Director-General: Lawrence Banks
- Staff: 600+
- Budget: €20.23 million (adjusted core budget, 2025); €13.22 million (external-fund revenue, 2025)
- Website: www.icgeb.org

The International Centre for Genetic Engineering and Biotechnology (ICGEB) was established as a project of the United Nations Industrial Development Organization (UNIDO) in 1983. The Organisation has three Component laboratories with over 45 ongoing research projects in Infectious and Non-communicable diseases, Medical, Industrial and Plant Biology Biotechnology in: Trieste (Italy), New Delhi (India) and Cape Town (South Africa).

On February 3, 1994, under the direction of Arturo Falaschi the ICGEB became an autonomous International Organisation and now has over 65 Member States across world regions.

Its main pillars of action comprise: Research, Advanced Education through PhD and Postdoctoral Fellowships, International Scientific Meetings and Courses, competitive Grants for scientists in Member States and Technology Transfer to industry.
