= List of Padma Shri award recipients (1990–1999) =

Recipients of a civilian award in India

Padma Shri
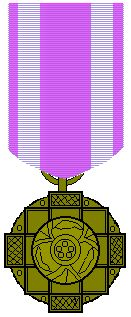
- Type: National Civilian
- Country: India
- Presented by: Government of India
- Ribbon
- Obverse: A centrally located lotus flower is embossed and the text "Padma" written in Devanagari script is placed above and the text "Shri" is placed below the lotus.
- Reverse: A platinum State Emblem of India placed in the centre with the national motto of India, "Satyameva Jayate" (Truth alone triumphs) in Devanagari Script
- Established: 1954
- First award: 1954

Highlights
- Total: 305

Precedence
- Next (higher): Padma Bhushan

Padma Shri Award, India's fourth highest civilian honours - Winners, 1990-1999:

== Recipients ==
Award recipients by year
Year	Number of recipients
1990	69
1991	83
1992	87
1993	0
1994	0
1995	0
1996	0
1997	0
1998	32
1999	34

Award recipients by field
Field	Number of recipients
Arts	72
Civil Service	12
Literature & Education	66
Medicine	46
Others	6
Public Affairs	5
Science & Engineering	33
Social Work	33
Sports	19
Trade & Industry	13

Key
# Indicates a posthumous honour

List of Padma Shri award recipients
Year	Recipient	Field	State/ Country
1990	Ram Narain Agarwal	Science & Engineering	Andhra Pradesh
1990	Mohan Agashe	Arts	Maharashtra
1990	Chandraprabha Aitwal	Sports	Uttar Pradesh
1990	Mohammad Swaleh Ansari	Trade & Industry	Uttar Pradesh
1990	N. H. Antia	Medicine	Maharashtra
1990	M. Aram	Literature & Education	Tamil Nadu
1990	G. Aravindan	Arts	Kerala
1990	Prabha Atre	Arts	Maharashtra
1990	Asgari Bai	Arts	Madhya Pradesh
1990	Gulab Bai	Arts	Uttar Pradesh
1990	Laurie Baker	Science & Engineering	Kerala
1990	Pradip Kumar Banerjee	Sports	West Bengal
1990	Anjan Kumar Banerji	Literature & Education	Uttar Pradesh
1990	Mallappa Krishna Bhargava	Medicine	Karnataka
1990	Balwantrai Bhatt	Arts	Uttar Pradesh
1990	Jatish Chandra Bhattacharyya	Science & Engineering	West Bengal
1990	Diwaliben Punjabhai Bhil	Arts	Gujarat
1990	Raj Bisaria	Arts	Uttar Pradesh
1990	Gisela Bonn	Others	– (Note: Indicates a citizen of Germany)
1990	Vijay Kumar Chopra	Literature & Education	Punjab
1990	Behram Contractor	Literature & Education	Maharashtra
1990	Ashim Dasgupta	Literature & Education	West Bengal
1990	Anutosh Datta	Medicine	West Bengal
1990	Premchand Degra	Sports	Punjab
1990	M. G. Deo	Medicine	Maharashtra
1990	Radha Mohan Gadanayak	Literature & Education	Odisha
1990	Madhav Yeshwant Gadkari	Literature & Education	Maharashtra
1990	S. M. Ganapathy	Arts	Andhra Pradesh
1990	Achyut Madhav Gokhale	Civil Service	Delhi
1990	Kamal Haasan	Arts	Tamil Nadu
1990	Anna Hazare	Social Work	Maharashtra
1990	Yashpal Jain	Literature & Education	Delhi
1990	Renana Jhabvala	Social Work	Gujarat
1990	Sharad Joshi	Literature & Education	Maharashtra
1990	Shanmugam Kameshwaran	Medicine	Tamil Nadu
1990	Bishamber Khanna	Arts	Delhi
1990	Krishen Khanna	Arts	Delhi
1990	M. R. Kurup	Science & Engineering	Kerala
1990	Allu Rama Lingaiah	Arts	Andhra Pradesh
1990	Tarun Majumdar	Arts	West Bengal
1990	Kanhiyalal Prabhakar Mishra	Literature & Education	Uttar Pradesh
1990	Jagdish Chandra Mittal	Arts	Andhra Pradesh
1990	Madhavi Mudgal	Arts	Delhi
1990	Gopi Chand Narang	Literature & Education	Delhi
1990	Madurai Ponnusamy Sethuraman Natesan	Arts	Tamil Nadu
1990	Ishwarbhai Jivaram Patel	Social Work	Gujarat
1990	Appasaheb Pawar	Science & Engineering	Maharashtra
1990	Dagdu Maruti Pawar	Literature & Education	Maharashtra
1990	Nilmani Phookan	Literature & Education	Assam
1990	Om Puri	Arts	Maharashtra
1990	Gulshan Rai	Sports	Maharashtra
1990	P. K. Rajagopalan	Medicine	Tamil Nadu
1990	B. V. Rao	Trade & Industry	Andhra Pradesh
1990	Kanak Rele	Arts	Maharashtra
1990	Leela Samson	Arts	Delhi
1990	Maharajapuram Santhanam	Arts	Tamil Nadu
1990	Chavaly Srinivasa Sastry	Civil Service	Delhi
1990	Guru Aribam Surchand Sharma	Literature & Education	Manipur
1990	Inder Sharma	Others	Delhi
1990	Jaman Lal Sharma	Sports	Uttar Pradesh
1990	Shyam Singh Shashi	Literature & Education	Delhi
1990	Ram Nath Shastri	Literature & Education	Jammu & Kashmir
1990	Taranath Narayan Shenoy	Sports	Maharashtra
1990	Shriniwas	Medicine	Delhi
1990	Ashok Chimanlal Shroff	Medicine	Maharashtra
1990	Barjinder Singh	Literature & Education	Himachal Pradesh
1990	Rajinder Singh	Others	Himachal Pradesh
1990	Silverine Swer	Social Work	Meghalaya
1990	Kapila Vatsyayan	Arts	Delhi
1991	M. M. S. Ahuja	Medicine	Delhi
1991	Sardar Anjum	Literature & Education	Punjab
1991	Shareefunnisa Begum Ansari	Literature & Education	Andhra Pradesh
1991	Rakesh Bakshi	Science & Engineering	Delhi
1991	Ravinder Kumar Bali	Medicine	Delhi
1991	Dinabandhu Banerjee	Social Work	West Bengal
1991	Rudraradhya Muddu Basavaradhya	Social Work	Karnataka
1991	Shreekrishna Mahadeo Beharay	Social Work	Maharashtra
1991	Sneh Bhargava	Medicine	Delhi
1991	Bharat Bhushan	Literature & Education	Uttar Pradesh
1991	Ranbir Singh Bisht	Arts	Uttar Pradesh
1991	P. B. Buckshey	Medicine	Delhi
1991	K. M. Cherian	Medicine	Tamil Nadu
1991	Vimla Dang	Social Work	Punjab
1991	B. L. Deekshatulu	Science & Engineering	Andhra Pradesh
1991	Vasantrao S. Dempo	Trade & Industry	Goa
1991	R. S. Narayan Singh Deo	Arts	Bihar
1991	Shadi Lal Dhawan	Literature & Education	Delhi
1991	Kapil Deva Dvivedi	Literature & Education	Uttar Pradesh
1991	Ram Ganpati	Civil Service	Delhi
1991	Ramesh Gelli	Trade & Industry	Karnataka
1991	Mahendra Kumar Goel	Medicine	Uttar Pradesh
1991	Bharath Gopi	Arts	Kerala
1991	Narinder Kumar Gupta	Science & Engineering	Delhi
1991	Syed Hassan	Literature & Education	Bihar
1991	B. K. S. Iyengar	Literature & Education	Karnataka
1991	Bimal Prashad Jain	Social Work	Delhi
1991	Shila Jhunjhunwala	Literature & Education	Delhi
1991	Chiranjilal Gograj Joshi	Social Work	Maharashtra
1991	Krishna Joshi	Science & Engineering	Haryana
1991	Satish Chandra Kakati	Literature & Education	Assam
1991	Neelkantha Anneppa Kalyani	Trade & Industry	Maharashtra
1991	Rameshwar Singh Kashyap	Literature & Education	Bihar
1991	Ghulam Mustafa Khan	Arts	Maharashtra
1991	Hafeez Ahmed Khan	Arts	Delhi
1991	Shanno Khurana	Arts	Delhi
1991	Vishnu Bhikaji Kolte	Literature & Education	Maharashtra
1991	Maharaj Krishan Kumar	Arts	Delhi
1991	R. K. Lelhluna	Literature & Education	Mizoram
1991	Madan Lal Madhu	Literature & Education	– (Note: Indicates a citizen of Russia)
1991	Namdeo Dhondo Mahanor	Literature & Education	Maharashtra
1991	Keshav Malik	Literature & Education	Delhi
1991	G. N. Malviya	Medicine	Uttar Pradesh
1991	Raghunath Anant Mashelkar	Science & Engineering	Maharashtra
1991	Shiela Mehra	Medicine	Delhi
1991	T. G. K. Menon	Social Work	Madhya Pradesh
1991	Surendra Y. Mohanty	Literature & Education	Odisha
1991	S. C. Munshi	Medicine	Maharashtra
1991	P. T. Narasimhachar	Literature & Education	Karnataka
1991	Mani Narayan	Arts	Maharashtra
1991	Gopaldas Neeraj	Literature & Education	Uttar Pradesh
1991	Govindarajan Padmanaban	Science & Engineering	Karnataka
1991	Venkatesan Padmanabhan	Social Work	Tamil Nadu
1991	Sonam Paljor	Sports	Uttarakhand
1991	Pratima Barua Pandey	Arts	Assam
1991	Manu Parekh	Arts	Delhi
1991	M. N. Passey	Medicine	Delhi
1991	Ashok Kumar Patel	Civil Service	Jammu & Kashmir
1991	Jagdish Kashibhai Patel	Social Work	Gujarat
1991	D. Y. Patil	Social Work	Maharashtra
1991	Ujwala Patil	Sports	Maharashtra
1991	Babulal Patodi	Public Affairs	Madhya Pradesh
1991	Jagdish Prasad	Medicine	Delhi
1991	Bangalore Puttaiya Radhakrishna	Science & Engineering	Karnataka
1991	Sundaram Ramakrishnan	Social Work	Maharashtra
1991	A. V. Rama Rao	Science & Engineering	Andhra Pradesh
1991	Padamanur Ananda Rau	Trade & Industry	Tamil Nadu
1991	Mehmood-ur Rehman	Civil Service	Jammu & Kashmir
1991	Kantilal Hastimal Sancheti	Social Work	Maharashtra
1991	Dhera Ram Shah	Social Work	Delhi
1991	Shivkumar Sharma	Arts	Maharashtra
1991	Selma D' Silva	Sports	Maharashtra
1991	Gurcharan Singh	Arts	Punjab
1991	Jai Pal Singh	Medicine	Haryana
1991	Prakash Singh	Civil Service	Uttar Pradesh
1991	Sharda Sinha	Arts	Bihar
1991	Rustom Phiroze Soonawala	Medicine	Maharashtra
1991	Naresh Trehan	Medicine	Delhi
1991	Ramanarayan Upadhyaya	Literature & Education	Madhya Pradesh
1991	Alarmel Valli	Arts	Tamil Nadu
1991	Hari Govindrao Vartak	Public Affairs	Maharashtra
1991	Ganeshan Venkataraman	Science & Engineering	Andhra Pradesh
1991	Hosagrahar Chandrashekhariah Visvesvaraya	Trade & Industry	Delhi
1992	Saiyid Amir Hasan Abidi	Literature & Education	Delhi
1992	Aspy Adajania	Sports	Maharashtra
1992	Mushtaq Ahmed	Literature & Education	Delhi
1992	Madhava Ashish	Science & Engineering	Uttar Pradesh
1992	Jaya Bachchan	Arts	Maharashtra
1992	Inderjit Kaur Barthakur	Civil Service	Delhi
1992	Ramsing Fakiraji Bhanawat	Social Work	Maharashtra
1992	Mathura Nath Bhattacharyya	Medicine	Assam
1992	V. G. Bhide	Literature & Education	Maharashtra
1992	Gulabdas Broker	Literature & Education	Maharashtra
1992	Krishna Chaithanya	Literature & Education	Delhi
1992	Pankaj Charan Das	Arts	Odisha
1992	Burjor Cavas Dastur	Medicine	Maharashtra
1992	Rathin Datta	Medicine	Tripura
1992	Biren De	Arts	Delhi
1992	Rajammal P. Devadas	Literature & Education	Tamil Nadu
1992	Laxmi Narayan Dubey	Literature & Education	Madhya Pradesh
1992	Mahamaya Prasad Dubey	Medicine	Delhi
1992	Lovelin Kumar Gandhi	Medicine	Delhi
1992	Felisa Garbala	Social Work	Gujarat
1992	Maadari Bhagya Gautam	Public Affairs	Karnataka
1992	Srirangam Gopalaratnam	Arts	Andhra Pradesh
1992	Khalid Hameed	Medicine	– (Note: Indicates a citizen of the United Kingdom)
1992	Jagjit Singh Hara	Science & Engineering	Punjab
1992	Lalchand Hirachand	Trade & Industry	Maharashtra
1992	Shanti Lal Jain	Others	Delhi
1992	Vasant Shankar Kanetkar	Literature & Education	Maharashtra
1992	Nilkanth Yeshwant Khadilkar	Literature & Education	Maharashtra
1992	Sabri Khan	Arts	Delhi
1992	Anil Kohli	Medicine	Delhi
1992	Sunita Kohli	Arts	Delhi
1992	Madurai N. Krishnan	Arts	Tamil Nadu
1992	V. C. Kulandaiswamy	Literature & Education	Delhi
1992	Manoj Kumar	Arts	Maharashtra
1992	Ramesh Kumar	Medicine	Delhi
1992	Ram Sarup Lugani	Literature & Education	Delhi
1992	Usha Kehar Luthra	Medicine	Delhi
1992	J. S. Mahashabde	Medicine	Madhya Pradesh
1992	K. M. Mammen Mappillai	Trade & Industry	Tamil Nadu
1992	P. V. A. Mohandas	Medicine	Tamil Nadu
1992	Eledath Thaikkattu Neelakandan Mooss	Medicine	Kerala
1992	B. N. Mukherjee	Others	West Bengal
1992	Meera Mukherjee	Arts	West Bengal
1992	Shovana Narayan	Literature & Education	Delhi
1992	M. K. Narayanan	Civil Service	Delhi
1992	Asha Parekh	Arts	Maharashtra
1992	Rukmini Baburao Pawar	Trade & Industry	Maharashtra
1992	Kameshwar Prasad	Medicine	Delhi
1992	Nataraja Ramakrishna	Arts	Andhra Pradesh
1992	Shanthi Ranganathan	Social Work	Tamil Nadu
1992	Gjanardhana Puranik Narayana Rao	Science & Engineering	– (Note: Indicates a citizen of Bhutan)
1992	Nisith Ranjan Ray	Literature & Education	West Bengal
1992	C. Rokhuma	Social Work	Mizoram
1992	Bhagaban Sahu	Arts	Odisha
1992	Dharam Pal Saini	Social Work	Madhya Pradesh
1992	J. N. Saksena	Civil Service	Delhi
1992	Kailash Sankhala	Science & Engineering	Rajasthan
1992	Vaman Sardesai	Public Affairs	Goa
1992	Meenakshi Sargogi	Trade & Industry	West Bengal
1992	Anandji Virji Shah	Arts	Maharashtra
1992	Kalyanji Virji Shah	Arts	Maharashtra
1992	Mahipatrai Jadavji Shah	Social Work	Maharashtra
1992	Vidyaben Shah	Social Work	Delhi
1992	Vijayakumar Swarupchand Shah	Medicine	Maharashtra
1992	Vinod Prakash Sharma	Science & Engineering	Delhi
1992	Sundari K. Shridharani	Arts	Delhi
1992	Oudh Narayan Shrivastava	Civil Service	Delhi
1992	Ajit Pal Singh	Sports	Delhi
1992	Sriram Singh	Sports	Delhi
1992	Hakam Singh	Sports	Delhi
1992	M. Kirti Singh	Literature & Education	Manipur
1992	Tapan Sinha	Arts	West Bengal
1992	Esther Abraham Solomon	Literature & Education	Gujarat
1992	Luis Jose De Souza	Medicine	Maharashtra
1992	Joseph Allen Stein	Science & Engineering	Delhi
1992	Muthu Muthiah Sthapathi	Arts	Tamil Nadu
1992	Homi J. H. Taleyarkhan	Public Affairs	Maharashtra
1992	Zal Sohrab Tarapore	Science & Engineering	Maharashtra
1992	Amrit Tewari	Medicine	Chandigarh
1992	B. K. Thapar	Literature & Education	Delhi
1992	Chittu Tudu	Arts	Bihar
1992	Mark Tully	Literature & Education	–
1992	Tadepalli Venkanna	Arts	Andhra Pradesh
1992	G. S. Venkataraman	Medicine	Tamil Nadu
1992	K. Viswanath	Arts	Andhra Pradesh
1992	Chitra Visweswaran	Arts	Tamil Nadu
1992	Alfred Georg Wuerfel	Others	Delhi
1998	Shiny Abraham	Sports	Kerala
1998	Manmohan Attavar	Science & Engineering	Karnataka
1998	Dipali Barthakur	Arts	Assam
1998	Leonarda Angela Casiraghi	Social Work	Karnataka
1998	Ranjit Roy Chaudhury	Medicine	Delhi
1998	B. N. Goswamy	Literature & Education	Chandigarh
1998	Priyambada Mohanty Hejmadi	Science & Engineering	Odisha
1998	Anil Kakodkar	Science & Engineering	Maharashtra
1998	Shambu Nath Khajuria	Social Work	Jammu & Kashmir
1998	Ramesh Krishnan	Sports	Tamil Nadu
1998	O. N. V. Kurup	Literature & Education	Kerala
1998	Mammootty	Arts	Kerala
1998	Kunja Bihari Meher	Arts	Odisha
1998	Naushad Ismail Padamsee	Trade & Industry	Maharashtra
1998	Antony Padiyara	Social Work	Kerala
1998	Chewang Phunsog	Civil Service	Delhi
1998	Aditya Narayan Purohit	Science & Engineering	Uttarakhand
1998	Lila Ram	Sports	Haryana
1998	Suryadevara Ramachandra Rao	Civil Service	Gujarat
1998	Shahir Krishnarao Sable	Arts	Maharashtra
1998	Lalsangzuali Sailo	Literature & Education	Mizoram
1998	Pradhan Shambu Saran	Science & Engineering	Delhi
1998	V. K. Saraswat	Science & Engineering	Andhra Pradesh
1998	Zohra Sehgal	Arts	Delhi
1998	K. Ibomcha Sharma	Arts	Manipur
1998	Gurdial Singh	Literature & Education	Punjab
1998	Pargat Singh	Sports	Punjab
1998	Shantha Sinha	Social Work	Andhra Pradesh
1998	U. Srinivas	Arts	Tamil Nadu
1998	Narayan Gangaram Surve	Literature & Education	Maharashtra
1998	Kanta Tyagi	Social Work	Madhya Pradesh
1998	Ralte Vanlawma	Social Work	Mizoram
1999	K. A. Abraham	Medicine	Tamil Nadu
1999	Javed Akhtar	Arts	Maharashtra
1999	Bashir Badr	Literature & Education	Madhya Pradesh
1999	Ruskin Bond	Literature & Education	Uttarakhand
1999	Raj Bothra	Medicine	– (Note: Indicates a citizen of the United States)
1999	Shayama Chona	Literature & Education	Delhi
1999	G. P. Chopra	Literature & Education	Delhi
1999	Asis Datta	Science & Engineering	Uttar Pradesh
1999	Namdeo Dhasal	Literature & Education	Maharashtra
1999	Saryu Vinod Doshi	Arts	Maharashtra
1999	Sulochana Latkar	Arts	Maharashtra
1999	Karnam Malleswari	Sports	Andhra Pradesh
1999	Sumati Mutatkar	Arts	Delhi
1999	Kanhaiya Lal Nandan	Literature & Education	Delhi
1999	Indira Nath	Science & Engineering	Delhi
1999	Harshavardhan Neotia	Trade & Industry	West Bengal
1999	Balendu Prakash	Medicine	Uttarakhand
1999	M. S. Ramakumar	Science & Engineering	Maharashtra
1999	Acharya Ramamurti	Social Work	Bihar
1999	M. V. Rao	Science & Engineering	Andhra Pradesh
1999	Rehmath Beegum Sailaniyoda	Medicine	Lakshadweep Islands
1999	T. Sailo	Social Work	Mizoram
1999	Virendra Singh Sethi	Science & Engineering	Chandigarh
1999	Satya Vrat Shastri	Literature & Education	Delhi
1999	S. K. Sikka	Science & Engineering	Haryana
1999	Rajkumar Jhalajit Singh	Literature & Education	Manipur
1999	Shobha Deepak Singh	Arts	Delhi
1999	Jagmohan Sursagar	Arts	Maharashtra
1999	Ram V. Sutar	Arts	Uttar Pradesh
1999	Sachin Tendulkar	Sports	Maharashtra
1999	Natwar Thakkar	Social Work	Nagaland
1999	Devendra Triguna	Medicine	Delhi
1999	Tsering Wangdus	Arts	Jammu & Kashmir
1999	P. K. Warrier	Medicine	Kerala

== Explanatory notes ==
Non-citizen recipients
