= Bhide =

Bhide is a surname among the Chitpavan Brahmin or Kokanastha Brahmin (i.e., "Brahmins native to the Konkan") community, a Hindu Brahmin community inhabiting Konkan, the coastal region of the state of Maharashtra in India. The community came into prominence during the 18th century when the heirs of Peshwa from the Bhat family of Balaji Vishwanath became the de facto rulers of the Maratha Empire. Under the British Raj, they were one of the Hindu communities in Maharashtra to flock to western education and, as such, they provided the bulk of social reformers, educationalists and nationalists of the late 19th century. Until the 18th century, the Chitpavans were held in low esteem by the Deshastha, the older established Brahmin community of Maharashtra region. Notable people with the surname include:

- Monica Bhide, American cookbook writer
- V. G. Bhide (1925–2006), Indian physicist and educationist
- Shamika Bhide (born 1994), Indian singer
- Sambhaji Bhide (1933–Present), Hindutva activist

In fiction

- Aatmaram Tukaram Bhide in Taarak Mehta Ka Ooltah Chashmah (portrayed by Mandar Chandwadkar)
- Sonalika "Sonu" Aatmaram Bhide in Taarak Mehta Ka Ooltah Chashmah (portrayed by Jheel Mehta, Nidhi Bhanushali and Palak Sindhwani)
- Madhavi Aatmaram Bhide in Taarak Mehta Ka Ooltah Chashmah (portrayed by Sonalika Joshi)

== Bhida ==
There is always confusion between Bhide and Bhida surname, as we all know that Bhide is a surname of The Chitpavan Brahmin or Kokanastha Brahmin. But Bhida is an Subcast of Jatav, who are classified as a Scheduled Caste under modern India's system of positive discrimination.
