= Chewang =

Chewang may refer to:

== People ==
- Chewang Norphel (born 1935), Indian civil engineer
- Chewang Phunsog, Indian civil servant
- Chewang Rinchen (1931–1997), Indian Army officer
- Gomchen Pema Chewang Tamang (1918–1966), Tibetan Buddhist scholar
- Pema Chewang (born 1967/1968), Bhutanese civil servant and politician

== Places ==
China

- Chewang, Hebei (车往镇), town in Wei County, Handan
- Chewang, Lanling County (车辋镇), town in Shandong
- Chewang, Sichuan (车辋镇), town in Hejiang County
- Chewang, Wudi County (车王镇), town in Shandong

== See also ==
- Chewang un'gi (Jewang ungi), a Korean historical poem
