= Atmaram =

Atmaram or Atma Ram may refer to:

- Atma Ram (politician), Afghan minister of Hindu religious background in the 19th century
- Atma Ram (director) (1930–1994), Hindi film and TV director
- Atma Ram (scientist) (1908–1983), Indian scientist
- Atmaram (film), a 1979 film with Indian actor Shatrughan Sinha
- A nickname for Vijayanandsuri (1821–1896), Jain religious leader
- Aatmaram Tukaram Bhide, a fictional character in Taarak Mehta Ka Ooltah Chashmah

== See also ==
- Atma Ram Sanatan Dharma College
