= Ibomcha =

Ibomcha is an Indian name mostly used in the state of Manipur by the Meitei people. Notable people with the surname include:

- K. Ibomcha Sharma, Indian singer
- Konsam Ibomcha Singh, Indian artist
- L Ibomcha Singh, Indian boxing coach
- Laisom Ibomcha Singh, Indian politician
