= Khehar =

Khehar, also spelt Kehar, is a surname of the Hindu and Sikh Khatris of Punjab. Notable people with the name include:

- Jagdish Singh Khehar (born 1952), Indian judge
- Usha Kehar Luthra (born 1932), Indian pathologist and cytologist
- Sutinder Khehar (born 1953), British field hockey player

== See also ==
- Kehar, Sindhi Rajput tribe
