= Vidyaben Shah =

Indian social worker and activist (1922–2020)

- Born: 7 November 1922; Jetpur, Kathiawar, India
- Died: 19 June 2020 (aged 97); Delhi, India
- Occupations: Economist, social activist
- Spouse: Manubhai Shah
- Website: Official website

Vidyaben Shah (7 November 1922 – 19 June 2020) was an Indian social worker and activist known for her work with children, women and the elderly in India. While she was already serving as Vice-President, she was appointed the first non-officio President of the New Delhi Municipal Council (NDMC) by Prime Minister Indira Gandhi in 1975. She has held several leading positions in the field of social welfare since the 1940s. Vidyaben Shah died at the age of 97 on 19 June 2020 at her residence in Delhi, her son Mihir Shah confirmed the news of Vidyaben Shah death.

== Early years and background ==
Vidyaben was born in the town of Jetpur, Gujarat, to educationist Vrajlal Mehta and Champaben Modi. Vrajlal was a school teacher at the time, later becoming principal of a teacher training college, and subsequently Director of Education in Saurashtra Government. Supported by her parents and brothers, Vidyaben always excelled in higher studies. At a young age when she was a university student she participated in the Quit India Movement under the guidance of Mohandas K. Gandhi. Already as a high school student she was influenced by Gandhi, and had created a stir in her school by bringing the message of nonviolence to her fellow students. After completing B.A. in Economics in 1942, as there was no postgraduate college in her parents' town, she left home to study for an M.A.. Since 1942, she has been one of India's leading activists in the field of child welfare and women's rights. She has been associated with a large number of organisations working for child welfare, education, Women and Family Welfare, Civic Administration, Fine Arts and Culture, Welfare of the Disabled, Senior Citizens and many other social and relief work activities. She has also received numerous awards for her distinguished work, including the Padma Shri by the Government of India in 1992.

In 1940 at a social function she met her would be husband Manubhai Shah who went on to become a Union Cabinet Minister in the governments of Jawaharlal Nehru, Lal Bahadur Shastri and Indira Gandhi. Manubhai was also an active Freedom Fighter in the Indian Independence Movement in the 1940s. In a simple ceremony Manubhai married Vidyaben in 1945. Their marriage was delayed by five years due to their active involvement in the Indian Freedom Movement and also Manubhai was imprisoned by the British Colonial Authority being released from jail in 1945. The marriage ceremony was so simple that the bride and groom wore plain cotton khadi clothes and for wedding gift Manubhai gave Vidyaben only one khadi saree which he had himself woven on a handloom using cotton yarn which he had himself handspun on a charkha (spinning wheel) while in prison during the Freedom Movement. Manubhai died in 2000. They have one daughter, three sons, three granddaughters and one grandson.

== Career ==
=== Child welfare ===
A pioneer in the field of child welfare, Behnji or Vidyaben, as she is affectionately known, laid the foundation of the Bal Bhavan movement by establishing the first ever Bal Bhavan in Rajkot, which was to become a harbinger of the entire Bal Bhavan Movement in India. In 1948, she was appointed the first Honorary Magistrate for Juvenile Courts in Rajkot, a post she held for 8 years. In 1956, when her husband transferred to New Delhi to join the Council of Ministers in the Cabinet of Pandit Nehru, she brought her activism to Delhi. Since 1956, she was actively associated for four decades in New Delhi with Bal Sahyog, a unique institution established by Indira Gandhi for the rehabilitation of vagrant children. Vidyaben became President of Bal Sahyog in 1966 and remained its President for the next ten years. During this time with the help of her husband she started many innovative workshops for the children providing them with skills to make furniture and other handmade items. Having run a boat club at the Rajkot Bal Bhavan, she brought over a boat from Bal Bhavan in Rajkot all the way to the Bal Sahyog in Delhi and with it she started the first ever boat ride at Delhi's India Gate which now entertains thousands of people every week from all over Delhi and beyond.

Vidyaben was President of the Indian Council for Child Welfare (ICCW) for twelve years from 1976 to 1979, and 1985 to 1994; ICCW is the single largest institution in India working for the welfare of children. Vidyaben represented India at the United Nations International Year of the Child conference at Tashkent in 1979. She also attended International Conferences on children held at Tehran, Geneva and Birmingham, USA. She attended the 6th SAARC Summit in Colombo in 1991. She was the Chairperson of the Christian Children's Fund Advisory Board for five years.

=== Women's welfare ===
Her involvement with women's issues dates back to her college days, where she set up the first craft centre for underprivileged women in Saurashtra. The Government of India appointed her as the chairman of the Central Social Welfare Board (CSWB) in 1995 for three years, during which time she initiated many path-breaking programmes to revive this premier institution to its old glory. A brainchild of Pandit Jawaharlal Nehru and Durgabai Deshmukh, CSWB was set up by an Act of Indian Parliament in August 1953. CSWB has been implementing various programmes for the welfare of women and children through its network of over 20,000 NGOs spread all over the country. During her tenure, Vidyaben expanded the programmes of Family Counselling Centres (FCC), Working Women's Hostels (WWH), Vocational Training Programmes and Creches. She set targets of providing support for at least one FCC and one WWH per district in the country. In 1995, as a member of the official Indian delegation, she attended the Fourth World Conference on Women held at Beijing, China. She also represented India at the 42nd Meeting of the United Nations Commission on the Status of Women held in New York in 1998.

=== Intercultural activities ===
She was President and active Trustee of Delhi Gujarati Samaj for over 40 years since 1958, playing a formative role in developing the multifarious social, cultural and educational activities for the Gujaratis of Delhi. Under her Presidency, the Gujarati Samaj started a Higher Secondary School in Delhi, where over 1000 students pay very nominal fees. Jawaharlal Nehru laid the foundation of the school. One of the most popular initiatives of the Samaj under Vidyaben's leadership was the development of the Sardar Vallabhbhai Bhavan (a hospitable guest house for economically weaker sections and students coming from outside Delhi). Vidyaben also pioneered the setting up of the Mahatma Gandhi Sanskrutik Kendra in the 1970s for facilitating cultural exchange between the people of Delhi. From the experience of the Delhi Gujarati Samaj, with support from eminent Gujaratis across India, in 1968 Vidyaben set up the Akhil Bharat Gujarati Samaj of which she was the founder President. Drawing guidance from the Akhil Bharat movement, many cities in India now have Gujarati Samaj spreading the traditions and culture of Gujarat and encouraging Gujaratis to mix with other peoples and creating an ethos of unity in diversity. Vidyaben continued to guide and support them.

=== Institutional builder in education ===
Vidyaben played a leading role in the establishment of one of Delhi's most renowned schools, Sardar Patel Vidyalaya. For many years, she was President of the Gujarat Education Society which runs the school. For several years, she was also a member of the Managing Committees of Modern School Barakhamba Road and Vasant Vihar, and of the Bharatiya Vidya Bhavan. She has been singly instrumental in establishing Sardar Patel Vidyaniketan, a school in the rural village of Mandi near Delhi. The school is run by Gujarat Education Society and caters to the economically weaker sections of society and especially encourages education of girls. Against all odds, over many years Vidyaben continued her efforts with all the relevant authorities to finally get official recognition of the school.

=== Institution builder in fine arts and culture ===
Vidyaben played a pioneering role in the establishment of the Triveni Kala Sangam, a premier institution for imparting training in dance, music and painting. She did a significant proportion of the fund raising for the construction of this institution and has been the President of Triveni Kala Sangam for over five decades, while the institution has been run by its Founder Director Sundari Krishnalal Shridharani.

=== Civic administration ===
As Vice-President and President of the New Delhi Municipal Council (NDMC), Vidyaben was instrumental in starting a large number of projects for the amelioration of the economically weaker sections of the Delhi society, particularly slum children and women. These projects include home for destitute children, home for abandoned children, hostels for working women, and the rehabilitation centre for the mentally challenged among others. She was responsible for initiating the concept of Navyug Schools that has proved a landmark in the educational field for gifted children from the economically weaker sections of the society. She also worked to improve the civic amenities and essential services of a rapidly growing metropolitan area of Delhi, to beautify it and make life comfortable for the citizens of Delhi. At the same time, she took up modernisation initiatives such as establishing a new office complex for the NDMC, housing blocks for its employees, and many commercial and shopping complexes.

=== Social activism ===
Vidyaben used her fundraising skills in providing relief in many national calamities, such as Bihar floods and Andhra Pradesh cyclone of the 1970s and Gujarat floods of the early 1980s. She also led peace marches from area to area at the outbreak of arson and riots in Delhi following the assassination of Indira Gandhi. After the Godhra riots in Gujarat, disregarding her advancing years, at the request of Sonia Gandhi, she went from district to district, to spread the message of peace and communal harmony in Gujarat.

=== Various other sectors ===
Vidyaben continued to be a trustee of the Helen Keller Trust (Blind and Deaf) in India. In 1985, during the United Nations "International Youth Year: Participation, Development and Peace", she provided remarkable leadership and the various organizations which she was heading or was connected with carried out outstanding reconstructive work under her able guidance. Between 1990 and 1993, she was the President of the Delhi State Branch of the Bharat Scouts and Guides, an organization devoted to the cause of national reconstruction. In 2005, she was nominated for the Ethics Committee for Research on Cardiac Disorders by the Indian Council for Medical Research.

Since the 1990s, she continued to be an active President of the Senior Citizens Service Forum which is a member of the State Council for Senior Citizens as well as a member of the National Council for Older Persons set up by the Indian Ministry of Social Justice and Empowerment. Among other activities, the Forum runs a daycare center for senior citizens and conducts adult education classes for women. In 2007 Vidyaben was invited to the Parliamentary Standing Committee on Social Justice and Empowerment to examine the "Maintenance and Welfare of Parents and Senior Citizens Bill 2007". She was also Chairperson of the Bhagidari Scheme of Delhi Government and a Sahayogi of an Electricity Board in Delhi. She was President Emeritus of the All India Kitchen Garden Association which encourages the growing of vegetables and flowers using organic methods and following of healthy lifestyle and eating habits across Delhi and other states.

== Awards ==
- 1976 Best Social Worker Award of the Federation of Organisations Working for Children in India
- 1986 The National Award of the Government of India for outstanding services in the field of Child Welfare
- 1987 Bal Mitra Award by Nehru Bal Samiti for distinguished work in educational and social projects towards welfare of children
- 1988 Bal Sahyog Award from the United Children's Movement in recognition of outstanding services in the welfare of children in India
- 1989 Nehru Fellow Award for outstanding achievements in field of child welfare activities
- 1990 Silver Elephant Award, the highest national award of the Scouts and Guides Movement awarded by the President of India
- 1992 Padma Shri awarded by Government of India; award presented by Shri R Venkataraman, President of India
- 1994 N V Gadgil Award for distinguished social service
- 1998 Samaj Sewa Shiromani Award from the Family Planning Association of India, New Delhi, for distinguished services in family planning
- 1999 Radha Raman Award for outstanding contribution to Delhi and its people in the field of Child Welfare and Social Work
- 2000 Vishwa Gurjari Award for significant contribution in the field of women's development, educational enhancement and welfare
- 2000 Woman of the Century Award ("Shatabdi Mahila" Award) for Social Work spanning the entire lifetime
- 2001 The Millennium Award from the All India Kitchen Garden Association for contributing to a green and clean environment
- 2001 Honoured by the Swatantrata Andolan Yadgar Samiti for valuable contribution to the freedom struggle
- 2002 Plaque of Honour of Indian Council for Child Welfare (ICCW) for "50 Golden Years of Service to the Children of India" presented by Sonia Gandhi
- 2005 Delhi Hindi Sahitya Sammelan Evam Chitra Kala Sangam Award on the International Women's Day
- 2006 Kalpana Chawla Excellence Award for excellence in the field of social service
- 2007 Freedom Fighter Award by Government of India at August Kranti Maidan, commemorating 65 years of Quit India Movement
- 2007 Salutation (Samman Patra) as Freedom Fighter on the 150th Anniversary of the First War of Indian Independence by the Government of Delhi
- 2007 Distinguished Senior Citizen Award of Shree Delhi Gujarati Samaj presented by the Chief Minister of Delhi Sheila Dikshit
- 2008 Freedom Fighter Award by the President of India at Rashtrapati Bhavan
- 2009 National Priyadarshini Samman as an "Epitome of Empowerment" given by Guild for Service to celebrate International Women's Week, presented by Women and Child Minister
- 2011 Honoured by Age-Care India for "dedication, contribution and welfare for the elders" to celebrate Elder's Day
- 2011 National Priyadarshini Award for "Lifetime Achievements and Contributions", presented by Social Justice and Empowerment Minister, Government of India
- 2013 Vishishtha Vyakti Gujarat Gaurav Award given by Akhil Bharat Gujarati Samaj, Ranchi, Jharkhand
- 2013 B R Ambedkar Award for Social Work, Delhi
