= Casiraghi =

Casiraghi is an Italian surname. Notable people with the surname include:

- Andrea Casiraghi (born 1984), fourth in line to the Monegasque throne after his mother, Caroline, Princess of Hanover
- Charlotte Casiraghi (born 1986), eleventh in line to the Monegasque throne after his mother, Caroline, Princess of Hanover
- Cinzia Casiraghi, an Italian physicist who won the Sofia Kovalevskaya Award
- Daniele Casiraghi, Italian footballer
- Sister Leonarda Angela Casiraghi, recipient of the Padma Shri Awards
- Pierluigi Casiraghi, (born 1969), Italian football player
- Pierre Casiraghi (born 1987), eighth in line to the Monegasque throne after his mother, Caroline, Princess of Hanover
- Rosagnese Casiraghi, mayor of Missaglia
- Stefano Casiraghi (1960–1990), second husband of Caroline, Princess of Hanover

Fictional characters:

- Signor Casiraghi, character in "Il mediatore"
- Camila Casiraghi, character in Juegos de fuego portrayed by Alejandra Fosalba
