= Khalsa College =

Khalsa College may refer to:

- Khalsa College, Amritsar, the historic institution founded in 1892
- Sri Guru Tegh Bahadur Khalsa College, a constituent college of the University of Delhi
- Guru Nanak Khalsa College (King's Circle), a college in Mumbai
- Lyallpur Khalsa College, established in Lyallpur (now Faisalabad, Pakistan) in 1908, shifted to Jalandhar in 1948
