= Sundaram Ramakrishnan (social activist) =

Indian freedom fighter

- Born: 22 July 1922; Thrissur, Kingdom of Cochin
- Died: 14 February 2003 (aged 80); Mumbai, Maharashtra
- Occupation: social activist
- Organization: Bharatiya Vidya Bhavan
- Movement: Indian Independence Movement

Sundaram Ramakrishnan or S. Ramakrishnan (22 July 1922 – 14 February 2003) was an Indian freedom fighter and social activist. He was widely known for his leadership to spread the values of Indian Culture globally as the director-general of the Bharatiya Vidya Bhavan and has been awarded both the Padma Shri and Padma Bhushan by the Government of India for his service to the nation.

Ramakrishnan was born in Pushpagiri, Thrissur in Kingdom of Cochin (now Kerala). During his school days, Ramakrishnan was heavily influenced by Mahatma Gandhi and Chandrashekarendra Saraswati, the then Paramacharya of Kanchi Kamakoti Peetham after they visited Malabar district during the Vaikom and Guruvayur Satyagraha to eradicate untouchability at Hindu temples. In 1939, he came to Bombay in search of employment and joined the individual Satyagraha movement a year later that was launched by Gandhiji and took an active part in the Constructive Program. He was imprisoned at Yerawada Central Jail, Pune during the Quit India Movement in 1942.

Closely associated with leaders of the Indian independence movement, he later went on to serve as the personal secretary of Sardar Vallabhbhai Patel after Patel's release from Ahmednagar Fort Jail on 15 June 1945 and during the 1946 Cabinet Mission to India up to a few months after he assumed the office of Deputy Prime Minister and settled down in Delhi.

Not wanting to continue Government service after Indian Independence, Sardar Patel introduced Ramakrishnan to K. M. Munshi who founded Bharatiya Vidya Bhavan which he later decided to join as the secretary in 1947.

He was especially devoted to the cause of Hindu-Muslim unity and was chosen as a member of the National Integration Council in 1991. The Bhavan's S. Ramakrishnan Memorial Public School at Akamala, Wadakanchery is named in his memory.

== Bharatiya Vidya Bhavan ==
Ramakrishnan devoted a large part of his life to spread Gandhian ideas and Indian culture through Bharatiya Vidya Bhavan. He was associated with serving the Bhavan for 56 years, joining it as the secretary in 1947 at the age of 25 and subsequently taking over as the director after the death of Bhavan's founder Munshiji in 1971 and up to his own death in 2003.

== Death ==
Ramakrishnan died of a massive heart attack at his residence in Mumbai on Valentine's Day 2003 aged 81.

== Civilian Honours ==
Ramakrishnan was awarded Padma Shri in 1991 and Padma Bhushan in 2001 for social work.
