= Suryadevara =

Suryadevara is an Indian surname.

- Suryadevara Ramachandra Rao Padma Shri Award recipient in 1998.
- Dhivya Suryadevara First female chief financial officer of General Motors
