= Lanling County =

Lanling County 兰陵县
- County
- Location of the seat in Shandong
- Coordinates: 34°51′N 118°04′E
- Country: People's Republic of China
- Province: Shandong
- Prefecture-level city: Linyi

Area
  - Total: 1,724 km^{2} (666 sq mi)
- Elevation: 43 m (141 ft)

Population (2019)
  - Total: 1,201,000
  - Density: 696.6/km^{2} (1,804/sq mi)
- Time zone: UTC+8 (China Standard)
- Postal code: 277700

Lanling County (simplified Chinese: 兰陵县; traditional Chinese: 蘭陵縣; pinyin: Lánlíng Xiàn) formerly Cangshan County (苍山县; 蒼山縣; Cāngshān Xiàn) is a county of southern Shandong province, bordering Jiangsu province to the south. It is under the administration of Linyi City.

The population was 1,137,651 in 1999. As of 2021, the resident population of Lansing County is 1,459,000 people.

== Administrative divisions ==
As of 2017, this County is divided to 1 subdistrict, 15 towns and 1 township. As of October 2019, Lanling County has 2 subdistricts, 14 towns and 1 township.County government in Bianzhuang street.

Subdistricts

- Bianzhuang Subdistrict (卞庄街道)
- Cangshan Subdistrict (苍山街道)

Towns

- Dazhongcun (大仲村镇)
- Lanling (兰陵镇)
- Changcheng (长城镇)
- Moshan (磨山镇)
- Shenshan (神山镇)
- Chewang (车辋镇)
- Shangyan (尚岩镇)
- Xiangcheng (向城镇)
- Xinxing (新兴镇)
- Nanqiao (南桥镇)
- Zhuangwu (庄坞镇)
- Lucheng (鲁城镇)
- Kuangkeng (矿坑镇)
- Luzuo (芦柞镇)

Townships

- Xiacun Township (下村乡)

== Climate ==
Lanling County has a warm temperate monsoon regional continental climate.It is characterized by long, dry and cold winters and hot, rainy summers.

Climate data for Lanling, elevation 45 m (148 ft), (1991–2020 normals, extremes 1981–present)
Month	Jan	Feb	Mar	Apr	May	Jun	Jul	Aug	Sep	Oct	Nov	Dec	Year
Record high °C (°F)	16.7 (62.1)	24.9 (76.8)	32.7 (90.9)	32.4 (90.3)	37.9 (100.2)	37.7 (99.9)	40.7 (105.3)	37.1 (98.8)	35.1 (95.2)	31.7 (89.1)	27.1 (80.8)	20.4 (68.7)	40.7 (105.3)
Mean daily maximum °C (°F)	5.2 (41.4)	8.6 (47.5)	14.5 (58.1)	21.1 (70.0)	26.4 (79.5)	30.4 (86.7)	31.3 (88.3)	30.5 (86.9)	27.1 (80.8)	21.7 (71.1)	14.0 (57.2)	7.1 (44.8)	19.8 (67.7)
Daily mean °C (°F)	−0.2 (31.6)	2.7 (36.9)	8.3 (46.9)	14.8 (58.6)	20.4 (68.7)	24.7 (76.5)	26.8 (80.2)	26.0 (78.8)	21.8 (71.2)	15.6 (60.1)	8.3 (46.9)	1.6 (34.9)	14.2 (57.6)
Mean daily minimum °C (°F)	−4.3 (24.3)	−1.9 (28.6)	2.7 (36.9)	8.8 (47.8)	14.7 (58.5)	19.8 (67.6)	23.3 (73.9)	22.5 (72.5)	17.6 (63.7)	10.9 (51.6)	3.7 (38.7)	−2.6 (27.3)	9.6 (49.3)
Record low °C (°F)	−15.3 (4.5)	−17.2 (1.0)	−12.4 (9.7)	−3.4 (25.9)	2.4 (36.3)	9.5 (49.1)	16.7 (62.1)	12.7 (54.9)	6.8 (44.2)	−2.7 (27.1)	−8.9 (16.0)	−15.3 (4.5)	−17.2 (1.0)
Average precipitation mm (inches)	13.9 (0.55)	17.4 (0.69)	20.4 (0.80)	39.8 (1.57)	81.5 (3.21)	101.7 (4.00)	233.8 (9.20)	196.3 (7.73)	69.6 (2.74)	30.4 (1.20)	30.9 (1.22)	16.0 (0.63)	851.7 (33.54)
Average precipitation days (≥ 0.1 mm)	3.7	4.4	4.8	6.2	8.0	7.9	13.1	12.4	7.8	5.5	5.4	4.1	83.3
Average snowy days	3.1	2.9	0.9	0.1	0	0	0	0	0	0	0.6	2.0	9.6
Average relative humidity (%)	65	64	60	61	66	69	80	82	76	70	69	66	69
Mean monthly sunshine hours	142.6	144.6	199.3	222.5	233.0	200.7	183.6	185.2	176.9	179.1	153.7	151.2	2,172.4
Percentage possible sunshine	46	46	53	57	54	46	42	45	48	52	50	50	49
Source: China Meteorological Administration

== Main tourist attractions ==
The ruins of the old city of Xiangyi,In the site has been collected half tube tile, half tiles, ceramic bean dish, gray ceramic spinning wheel, etc., is the Spring and Autumn period of cultural relics.

Dazongshan Langgong Temple, is located in the mountain and has a long history of being built in the Eastern Jin Dynasty.In addition, there are many relics and attractions in the scenic area, such as the Ten Thousand Years Old Pine, the Red Child Bridge, the Fairy Pond, and the Pavilion of Gathering Immortals.The temple fair activity on the eighth day of the third month of the lunar calendar every year has become the main program of the scenic spot.

Wenfeng Mountain，there are the Monument to the Martyrs of the Yinchang Tragedy, the Tomb of Martyr Zeng Mingtao, Director of the Political Department of the Eighth Division of the Shandong Military Region, and the Tomb of Martyr Guo Yunfang, the leader of the Cangshan Riot, and so on.
