= Krishnavatara =

Novel by K.M.Munshi

Krishnavatara (Hindi: कृष्णावतार) is a series of seven novels written by K.M. Munshi. A projected eighth novel was not completed. The series is based on the life of Krishna and the epic Mahabharata.

== Books ==
- Krishnavatara I: The Magic Flute
- Krishnavatara II: The Wrath of an Emperor
- Krishnavatara III: The Five Brothers
- Krishnavatara IV: The Book of Bhima
- Krishnavatara V: The Book of Satyabhama
- Krishnavatara VI: The Book of Vedavyaasa The Master
- Krishnavatara VII: The Book of Yudhishthira
- Krishnavatara VIII: The Book of Kurukshetra (incomplete)

== Synopsis ==
Krishnavatara I: The Magic Flute opens with the marriage of Vasudava and Devaki, sister of Kamsa and daughter of Ugrasena. Sage Narada prophesied to Kamsa that eighth the child of Devaki would kill him. He imprisons Devaki and Vasudava. Kamsa kill killed six children of Devaki. Gargacharya and Akrura rescue the last two children, Balarama and Krishna, from Kamsa and gives them to Nanda. Warned by the gods, Kamsa sends Putana to kill Krishna but Putana fails. Krishna kills Trinavarta and uproots Arjuna trees. Krishna survives an encounter with Kaliya and holds Gowardhan to save Vrindavana. When Kamsa learns about Krishna's miracles, he sends Akrura to take Krishna to Mathura. Krishna and Balarama go to mathura and kill Kamsa.

Krishnavatara II: The Wrath of an Emperor is based on Harivamsa. The book opens with the coronation of Ugrasena. Krishna and Balarama travel to Sandipani ashram. Sandipani's son Punardatt is abducted by Punyajaya so Krishna and Udhhava kill Punyajava to support Punardatt. Punardatt was in Vaivastapuri (land of death), but Krishna saves him. After they complete their education Krishna and Balarama return to Mathura. Soon Yadavas get news that Kamsa's father-in-law Jarasandha will attack Mathura. Krishna escapes with Balarama to save Yadavas. They come to Mount Gomantaka, but Jarasandha arrives there and set Gomantaka on fire. Krishna and Balarama fight and defeat Jarasandha. Krishna also kills Shrigalava and defeats Karavirapura. Jarasandha adopts a new strategy to marry Rukmini to Shisupala by arranging false Swayamvara. Krishna and his army of Yadavas travel to Kundinpura claiming to pay homage to Rukmini's grandfather Kaisika. Jarasandha postpones Swayamvara because of Krishna. Krishna learns that Kalayavana plans to attack Mathura. Krishna and the Yadavas leave Mathura for Dwarka. Krishna meets Kalayavana and misleads him, Mmuchukunda then burns Kalayavana. Krishna returns to Kundinpura and abducts and marries Rukmini.

Krishnavatara III: The Five Brothers is based on the Mahabharata story of Pandavas who escapes from Varanavata and the evil plan of Duryodhana. Satyavati asks Krishna to find her great grandson Pandavas. Krishna finds him in Rakshavarta with the help of Udhhava and Nagas. Pandavas marries Draupadi.

Krishnavatara IV: The Book of Bhima deals with Bhima who falls in love with Jaladhara, sister of Duryodhana's wife Bhanumati, who died delivering a son. Yudhisthira shares his Kingdom with Duryodhana, angering Bhima. Krishna convinces Bhima to leave Hastinapur. Pandavas with help of Krishna and other Yadavas builds a new city Indraprastha.

Krishnavatara V: The Book of Satyabhama narrates the story of Syamantaka, jewel of Satrajit. Satrajit Yadava was against Krishna so he gives up Syamantaka to Prasanajita and claims Krishna tried to steal it. Krishna with the help of Satyabhama and Satyaki find Syamantaka in bear-world. Krishna marries Jambavati and escapes from bear-world. Satyabhama gives Syamantaka to Prasanajita and marries Krishna.

Krishnavatara VI: Book of vedavyaasa the master starts when sage Parashara takes his son Krishna (Vyasa) by fishergirl Matsyagandha. Parashara wants to rebuild Dharmakshetra ashram, but Parashara is killed by wolves. When Krishna (Dwaipayana) wants to re-establish ashram, Rakshasas attack on him but save by Jabali. Krishna went to Hastinapur to meet king Shantanu to re-establish the glory of Dharmakshetra. In Hastinapur, Krishna discovers his mother as queen Satyavati. Krishna convinces Vibhuti, Shotriya of Hastinapur to join Vajapeya Yagna. Dharmakshetra is re-established. Many years later Vyasa and wife Vatika, daughter of Jabali, have son Suka. Suka is caught by Mocca, but Vyasa frees him. Vyasa also performs Niyoga to save Kuru lineage.

Krishnavatara VII: Book of Yudhisthira deals with Yudhisthira who wants to perform Rajayusa Yagna. He asks Krishna for help. Krishna, Arjuna and Bhima go to Magadha. Bhima kills Jarasandha and establishes Sahdeva as king. During Rajasuya, Bhishma suggests Agrapooja to Krishna. Shisupala cannot bear it and tries to kill Krishna, but Krishna beheads him. Vyasa tells Yudhisthira that he has become the centre of the great war, so Yudhisthira becomes worried and accepts Duryodhana's invitation to play dice. In the game he loses his wealth, brother, wife and himself. Dushasana tries to unwrap Draupadi, but is saved by Krishna. In the last game Yudhisthira loses again and is exiled for 12 years.

Krishnavatara VIII: Book of kurukshetra starts with the news that Krishna's father vasudava has been taken by Salwa of Saubha, so he sent his son Pradhyumna to deal with Salwa. Salwa's minister Vajranabhi imprisoned Pradhyumna by order of Salwa and Vajranabhi married his daughter Prabhavati to Pradhyumna. At the time Mayavati came to help him escape Salwa.

== Preface ==
Krishna literature has grown since it first took definite shape in Mahabharata, then in Harivamsha and Vishnu Purana, and was elaborated in Shrimad Bhagavata and other Puranas. To this literature in Sanskrit has been added other literature, for the story of his life has been told in epic, song and story by thousands of poets in every Indian language for centuries. In the course of being so told, Shri Krishna has come to be invested with traits and credited with exploits of such divergent nature that it becomes difficult, if not impossible, for a reader to have a clear picture of the Krishna as he was known by his contemporaries. In making this attempt to divest his personality of later accretions, Munshi has sifted the available Krishna literature in Sanskrit to find the Krishna as he must have lived. Then, with the aid of his creative imagination, he has woven the essential events of his life with romance, to present in this work, Shri Krishna at once as a man, a superman and God. What was, according to Bhagavata, the story of God who had come to the world as a man, has become, in Munshiji's hands, the fascinating story of a man who became God.
