= Lilavati Munshi =

Indian politician and Gujarati essayist

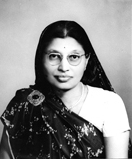

Member of Parliament (Rajya Sabha)
- In office 1952–1958
- Constituency: Bombay State

Member of Bombay Legislative Assembly
- In office 1937–1946

Personal details
- Born: 21 May 1899
- Died: 20 February 1978 (aged 78)
- Party: Indian National Congress
- Spouses: Lalbhai Sheth (died 1926); Kanaiyalal Maneklal Munshi (m. 1926; died 1971)
- Children: 2 sons, 4 daughters

Lilavati Munshi was an Indian politician and Gujarati essayist. She was a member of the Bombay Legislative Assembly from 1937 to 1946 and the Rajya Sabha from 1952 to 1958 as a member of the Indian National Congress. She wrote essays and sketches.

== Biography ==
Lilavati was born on 21 May 1899 in a Gujarati Jain family of Keshavlal.

Since the 1920s, she was associated with the Indian independence movement. She participated in the Salt Satyagraha and the Civil Disobedience Movement. She was imprisoned by the British authorities for her activism.

In the 1950s, she founded the Society for the Prevention of Unhealthy Trends in Motion Pictures in Bombay. In 1954, she moved a resolution to prohibit screening of 'undesirable' films and obscene scenes, which was adopted by the House following which the government amended the Cinematograph Act in 1959. Kissing scenes were not uncommon in Indian films till the 1950s; it was largely due to her movement that they vanished.

She was a member of erstwhile Bombay Legislative Assembly from 1937 to 1946. She served as a member of the Rajya Sabha, the upper house of the Parliament of India from 3 April 1952 to 2 April 1958 representing Bombay State as a member of the Indian National Congress.

She died on 20 February 1978.

== Literary works ==
She contributed significantly in the field of character sketches and personal essays. Rekhachitro ane Bija Lekho, a collection of character sketches, was published in 1925. It consists of character sketches of mythical, historical and literary personalities and of contemporary men and women, mostly Gujaratis. Vadhu Rekhachitro (1935) included some more sketches. Kumardevi, a collection of her essays, was published in 1929. Her short stories and short plays were collected in Javan Ni Vate (1977). Sanchaya (1975) is the compilation of articles written by her.

== Personal life ==
Her first marriage was to Lalbhai Sheth. After he died in 1926, she married Gujarati writer Kanaiyalal Maneklal Munshi. They had two sons and four daughters.

== See also ==
- List of Gujarati-language writers
