= MIOT International Hospital =

Coordinates: 13.02122°N 80.185786°E

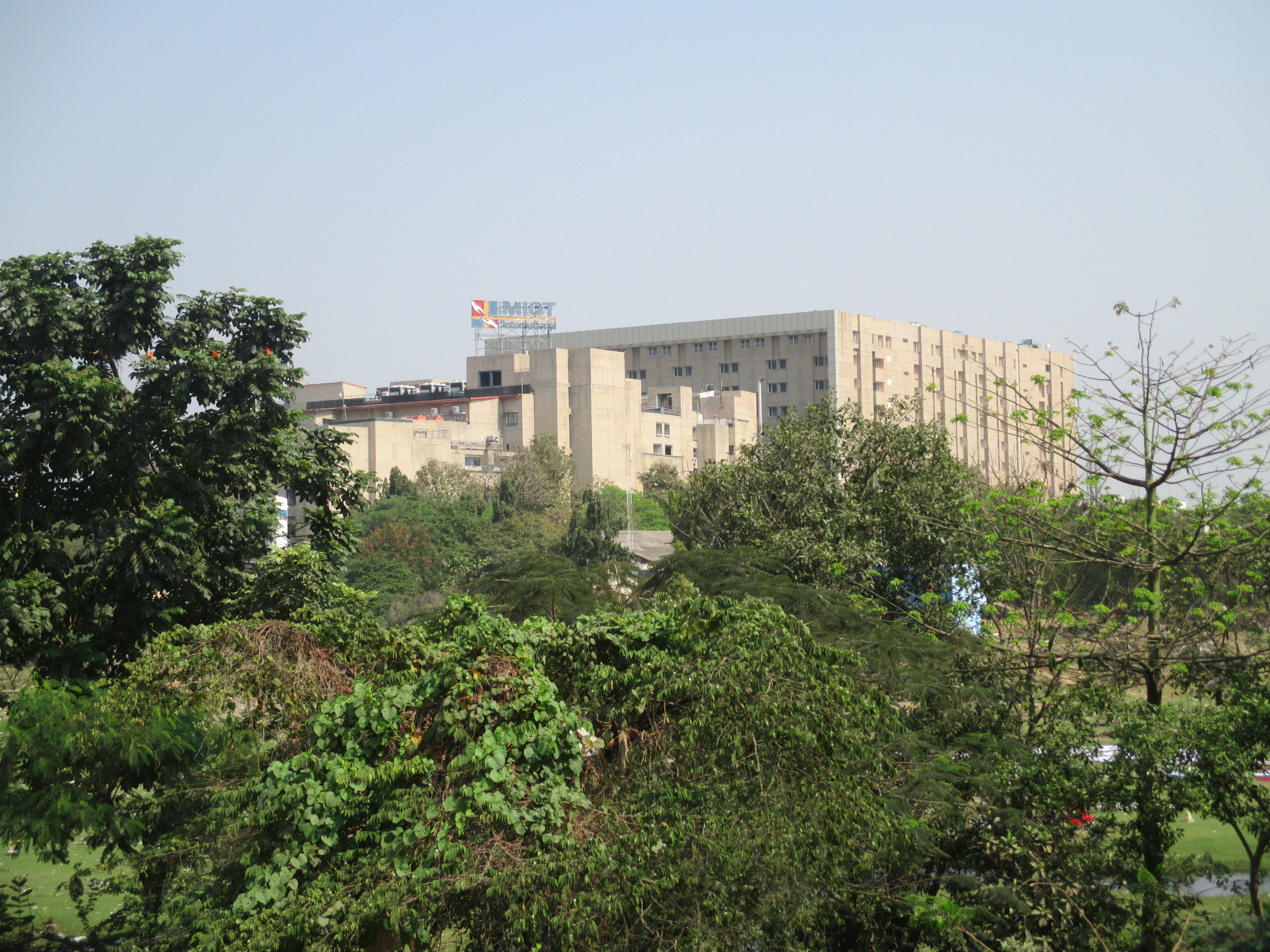
- MIOT Hospitals in Chennai

Geography
- Location: Chennai, Tamil Nadu, India

Organisation
- Care system: Private
- Type: Multispeciality

Services
- Emergency department: Dial 105710
- Beds: 1000

History
- Founded: February 1999

Links
- Website: www.miotinternational.com
- Lists: Hospitals in India
- Other links: P. V. A. Mohandas

The Madras Institute of Orthopaedics and Traumatology, known in short as the MIOT International Hospital, is a multi-specialty hospital in Manapakkam, Chennai, India. It is a specialty hospital in the field of joint replacement surgeries, Interventional Cardiology, orthopaedics, and trauma. Founded by P. V. A. Mohandas, the hospital was established in February 1999 on 14-acre (5.7 ha) land with German collaboration, with an initial investment of ₹500,000. The hospital has 1000 beds and employs 170 physicians. It receives nearly 3,500 foreign patients every year, contributing 25 percent of the hospital's patients. North and East Africa account for many of these foreign patients.

== History ==
MIOT Hospital began as an independent entity, specialising in orthopaedics, at Chennai-based Vijaya Hospital in 1987. It moved to Manapakkam, a suburb of Chennai, in 1999. Its founder and managing director, P. V. A. Mohandas, is also chief surgeon in the Department of Orthopaedic Surgery. Started as a centre for orthopaedics, the hospital has become a multi-speciality one dealing with thoracic and cardiovascular care, cardiology, nephrology, neurosurgery, oncology and radiation oncology, hip-replacement surgery, knee replacement, accident surgery, plastic surgery, craniofacial and cosmetic surgery, paediatrics, and obstetrics.

On 18 May 2012, a heart revive centre was inaugurated at a cost of ₹300 million, with a full-fledged cathlab and an electro-physiology laboratory for the treatment of arrhythmia, or irregular heartbeat. In the same year, the hospital started the MIOT International Centre housing the departments of oncology, radiation oncology, medical oncology, surgical oncology, liver transplant centre and bone marrow transplant centre. There are also plans to open a heart transplant centre.

== Achievements ==
=== 1st Time in the World Across-Blood Group Kidney Transplantation in a recipient with the Bombay O Blood Group ===
For the 1st Time in the World, MIOT Hospitals Performed an Across-Blood Group Kidney Transplantation in a recipient with the Bombay O Blood Group. Due to his Bombay O blood group, he could receive blood or organs only from someone with the same blood group, which is very rare and prevalent in only 1 in 10,000 people in India. Globally, a kidney transplant has never been reported in a recipient with the Bombay O blood group due to the rarity and higher complications involved. Additionally, the lack of precedents or guidelines for monitoring anti-H antibody levels, which are significant in preventing organ rejection, made the transplantation highly challenging. However, MIOT’s solid organ transplant specialists, with their extensive experience, completed this groundbreaking procedure by performing an across-blood group kidney transplantation in a Bombay O recipient. They brought down the anti-H antibody titers to the optimum level and successfully completed the procedure.

=== Bone marrow transplant ===
The MIOT Institute of Haematology, Haemato-Oncology & BMT performed the first T-replete haplo identical bone marrow transplant in India in 2013.

=== Liver transplant ===
An emergency liver transplant saved a rapidly deteriorating 26-year-old mother with jaundice and a severely damaged liver.

=== Biplane CathLab ===
For the first time in India, MIOT Hospitals brings a Biplane CathLab with Cone Beam CT, 3D Echo and software intelligence – all on a single platform.

== The future ==
The hospital group is investing ₹2,800 million on a 600-bed 6-star facility for cancer treatment named 'MIOT International' under construction near the existing facility. The 13-floor building will house 14 operation theatres, a bunker, a sterilisation unit, 500 premium rooms and 100 beds for critical care. It is being constructed by L&T. It will employ about 100 physicians.

== Awards and recognition ==
- Niryat Shree Gold Award 2002 – 2003
- Niryat Shree Gold Award 2009 – 2010
- FIEO Niryat Shree Bronze Trophy 2008 – 2009
- FIEO Southern Region Export Excellence Award 2012 – 2013
- FIEO Southern Region Export Excellence Award 2013 – 2014
- FIEO Southern Region Export Excellence Award 2015 – 2016

== Accreditations ==
- National Accreditation Board for Hospitals & Healthcare Providers
- National Accreditation Board for Hospitals & Healthcare Providers - Medical Imaging services
- MIOT International is now the 1st hospital in India to receive IASIOS Accreditation, a prestigious global recognition for excellence in Interventional Oncology (IO). IASIOS is the world’s only accreditation focused on the quality and safety of cancer treatments by interventional radiologists. Developed by the European Society of Interventional Radiology, it evaluates the full patient journey from diagnosis to follow-up.

== MoU ==
MIOT Hospitals signs MoU With Leading Transplant Centre "The Alfred Hospital", Australia.

MIOT signs MoU with The Christie Foundation for cancer treatment

== See also ==
- Healthcare in Chennai
