= Patan trilogy =

- Patan Ni Prabhuta (1916); Gujarat No Nath (1917); Rajadhiraj (1922)
- Author: Kanaiyalal Maneklal Munshi
- Translator: N. D. Jotwani; Rita Kothari; Abhijit Kothari
- Country: India
- Language: Gujarati
- Genre: Historical fiction
- No. of books: 3

Patan trilogy consists of three Gujarati historical novels written by Indian writer Kanaiyalal Maneklal Munshi. These three novels are Patan Ni Prabhuta (transl. The Glory of Patan), Gujarat No Nath (transl. The Lord and Master of Gujarat) and Rajadhiraj (transl. The King of Kings). Written in chronological order, though having separate stories, the trilogy deals with the Solanki rule in Gujarat.

== Publication history ==
Munshi published the first part of trilogy, Patan Ni Prabhuta, in 1916 under the pseudonym 'Ghanshyam'. The second part, Gujarat No Nath, and the third part, Rajadhiraj, were published in 1917 and 1922 respectively.

== Characters ==
The principle characters of the novel are:

- Munjal – amatya (chief minister) of Patan
- Jayasimha – the young king of Patan
- Minal – Rajamata (mother of the king), beloved of Munjal
- Kak – an adventurous warrior
- Manjari – a young, modern woman who marries Kak
- Kirtidev – a visionary, Mujal's son

== Plot ==
Patan Ni Prabhuta, the first of the series, has Asmita (self-consciousness) as its theme. Minaldevi, the mother of the king, craves for power at any cost, while Munjal, the amatya (minister) believes in the people's rule. He is interested in the harmony and integrity of Gujarat. Just to gain power, Minaldevi joins hands with Anandsuri but the people of Patan revolt and depose Minaldevi, who ultimately realizes the greatness of Patan.

Gujarat No Nath puts forward the concept of the integrity of entire Āryāvarta. There is a four-year gap between the end of Patan Ni Prabhuta and the beginning of Gujarat No Nath. The political situation of the novel has two contexts: treaty with Avanti and conflict with Sorath. The novel emphasises that national unity is essential to face outside invasion and defend liberty. Just to project this idea, the author introduces the fictional character of Kirtidev. Kirtidev tries to uphold the unity of Patana and Avanti but Munjal opposes this, and the dream of Kirtidev is shattered. Kak also proposes to unite Āryāvarta, but by power. His adventures, designed to fulfill his political ambitions and to win Manjari's heart, cover the major part of the novel and are narrated in a romantic style. Udayan plays the villain and his clash with Kak for the fair hand of Manjari is elaborately described. The aim of the episode is to add passion to a tale of adventure.

The importance of Kak is further heightened in Rajadhiraj, the last of the series. Kak departs for Sorath. In the absence of Kak, Revapal revolts in the region of Lata and declares independence, but the army of Patana crushes the revolt. To bring about a union of Lata and Patana, Kak arranges the marriage of Mrinalkumvariba, the princess of Lata, with Maharaj Jaidev, but fails to establish peace. He struggles hard to win over the disgruntled soldiers of Lata and at last becomes successful.

== Reception and criticism ==
The trilogy became famous, and with its publication, Munshi became a household name in Gujarat. N. D. Jotwani translated Gujarat No Nath, the second part of the trilogy, into English in 1995. It was titled The Master of Gujarat: A Historical Novel. The trilogy has been co-translated by Rita Kothari and her husband Abhijit Kothari: Patan Ni Prabhuta as The Glory of Patan (2017), Gujarat No Nath as The Lord and Master of Gujarat (2018) and Rajadhiraj as The King of Kings (2019).

Writers Radheshyam Sharma and Raghuveer Chaudhari note in their book Gujarati Navalkatha (Gujarati novel): "one cannot deny the allure of the aesthetic pleasure that Munshi has created by delightfully delineating the wrestling of the brawn with the brain in Patan Ni Prabhuta, Gujarat No Nath and Rajadhiraj. It is constantly felt that writer's powerful personality has a hold over the story-line.".

Manubhai Pancholi, a Gujarati writer, accused Munshi of being unfaithful to history, and said that "In Gujarat No Nath, Rajadhiraj, and Patan Ni Prabhuta, he [Munshi] has twisted and distorted historical facts". Critic Dhirendra Mehta also noted that, though there are references to Munjal and Kak in the history of Gujarat, they are quite transformed in the narrative. He felt that the character of Kak is overly glorified in the novel and treated as a hero, while Siddharaja Jayasimha, who according to him, was a respectable king of Gujarat, loses his grace. According to Mehta, Munshi does not go strictly by historical facts; his aim is to make the story interesting. He adds that chronological and geographical details often lack accuracy. He praised the trilogy for the conflict and dramatisation of situations, individuality of characters, short and sparkling dialogues, and picturesque narration.
