= Guru Nanak Khalsa College of Arts, Science & Commerce =

College in Mumbai

Coordinates: 19.025171°N 72.856505°E

Guru Nanak Khalsa College of Arts, Science and Commerce
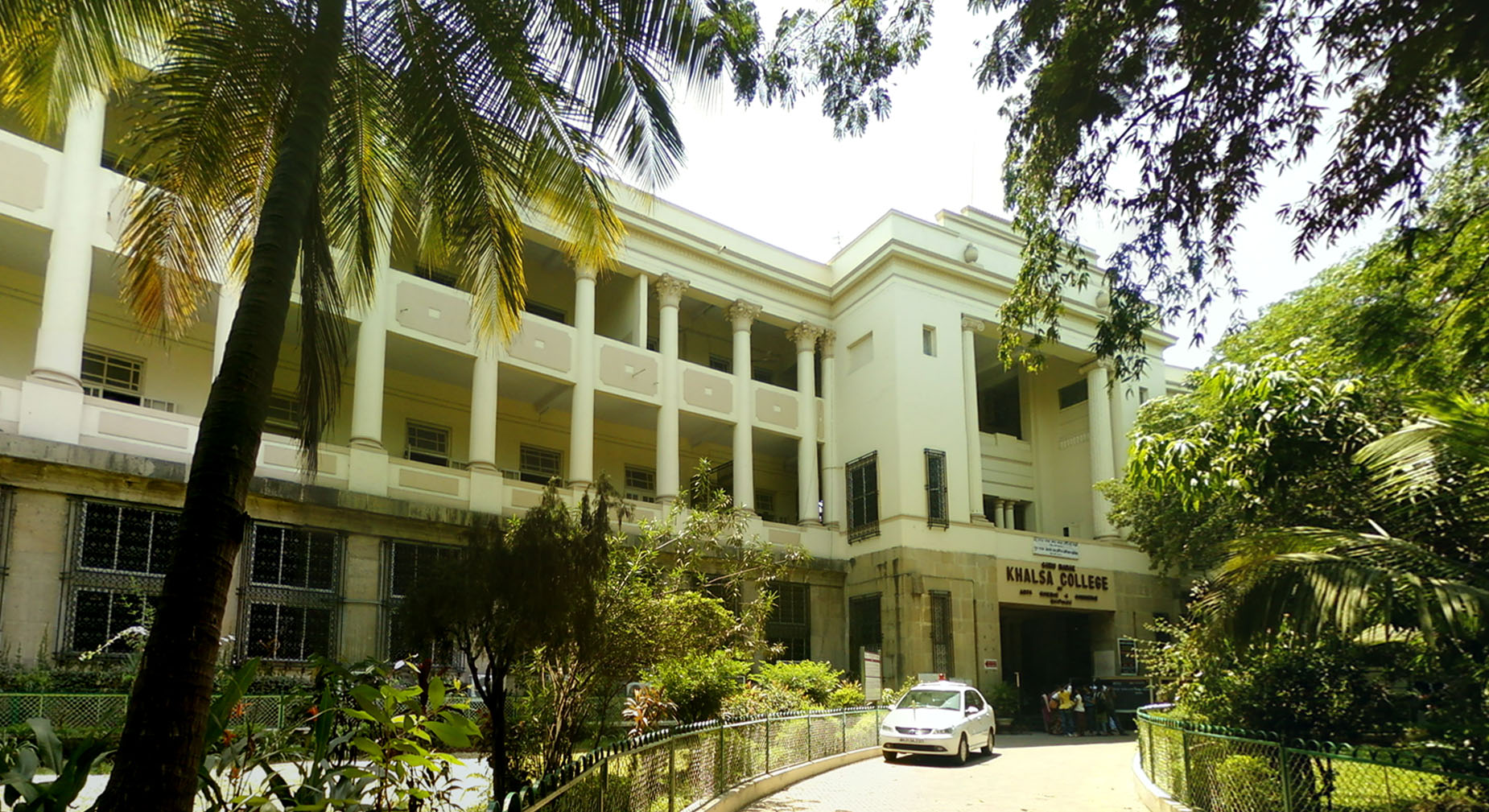
- Motto: Essence of Wisdom is Service to Humanity
- Type: Private – Research
- Established: 1937; 89 years ago
- Academic affiliations: University of Mumbai
- Chairman: Sardar Gurinder Singh Bawa
- Principal: Dr. Ratna Sharma
- Faculty: 200
- Administrative staff: 150
- Students: 6000
- Location: Matunga, Mumbai, Maharashtra, India
- Campus: 27,642 sq. yds.
- Website: www.gnkhalsa.edu.in

Guru Nanak Khalsa College is an affiliate college of University of Mumbai in Matunga, Mumbai. It offers undergraduate, Masters and PhD programs in arts, science and commerce disciplines.

== History ==
The college was established in 1952 by the Shiromani Gurdwara Prabandhak Committee.

G. N. Khalsa College of Arts, Science & Commerce was the brainchild of B. R. Ambedkar, who wanted to set up a center or an institute in Bombay for higher education. In 1935, he put forth this proposal of establishing an educational institution for higher education in Bombay to the Sikh religious leaders at panjab. B. R. Ambedkar had faith and interest upon Sikh religion, The Sikh leaders agreed upon this idea with their main objective of providing good quality of higher education and also to popularize Sikh culture in a non-Sikh State. Thus in 1937, G. N. Khalsa College was born in a plot where the This college stands for it dignity and the quality of its education stands today, with the total area of 27,642 sq. yards.

== Campus ==
The college located in Matuga east, and this college has better faculty immediate vicinity of three other institutions of learning, namely Don Bosco School, Institute of Chemical Technology, and the Veermata Jijabai Technological Institute. The colleges also houses a gurudwara within its campus.

== Academics ==
The college is permanently affiliated to the University of Mumbai and was accorded the UGC recognition under 2f in 1974. Its financial status is grant-in-aid.

It also conducts classes on Punjabi, Divinity and carries out Akhand Path followed by Langar.

== Notable alumni ==
The college has produced notable people in various fields. The college has also produced many famous Sports personalities, Indian Hockey team members, Olympians, Arjuna award winners and Padmashris. The following Khalsites have represented India in Olympics:

- S. S. Narayan (Football)
- Mary Leela Rao (Athletics), * Balbir Singh (Hockey)
- Selma D'Silva (Hockey), * Lorraine Fernandes (Hockey), * Joaquim Carvalho (Hockey)
- Marcellus Gomes (Hockey)
- Mark Patterson (Hockey)
- Jude Menezes (Hockey), Adrian D’Souza
- Gavin Ferreira
- Lorraine Fernandes
- Selma D'Silva is also a recipient of the prestigious Padmashri.

Cinema personalities who studied at Khalsa college include Ramesh Talwar (director), Kuldeep Singh (composer), Salim Khan (screenwriter) and Akshay Kumar (Bollywood actor), Mandar Chandwadkar (popular TV Serial actor).

Ishrat Jahan, a 19-year-old woman was allegedly killed in an encounter was a second year student of Bachelor of Science of the college in 2004.

== See also ==
- List of places named after Guru Nanak Dev
