= Sonalika Joshi =

Indian actress (born 1976)

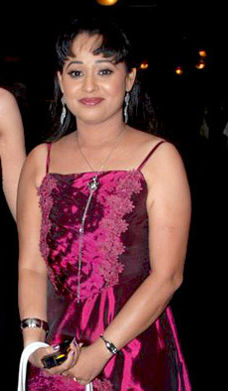
- Joshi in 2012
- Born: Sonalika Kamble; 5 June 1976 (age 50); Mumbai, Maharashtra, India
- Occupation: Actor
- Years active: 2004–Present
- Known for: Taarak Mehta Ka Ooltah Chashmah
- Spouse: Sameer Joshi (m. 2001)
- Children: 1

Sonalika Joshi (born 5 June 1976) is an Indian television actress. She is better known for her character of Madhavi Bhide in India's longest running sitcom television series Taarak Mehta Ka Ooltah Chashmah.

== Personal life ==
Joshi has completed B.A. with History Fashion Designing & Theatre. She is married to Sameer Joshi and has one daughter, Arya Joshi.

== Career ==
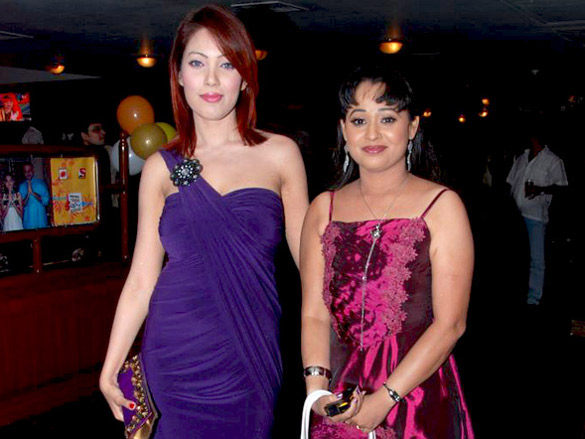
Sonalika Joshi with Munmun Dutta in 2012

Joshi has acted in theatre plays like Baiko Asun Shejari, Wadhta Wadhta Wadhe, Bol Bachchan, Choukon etc early in her life. Later on, she did Marathi TV serials like Paus Yeta Yeta, Kimayagar, Mahashweta, Nayak, Ek Shwasache Antar, Jagnavegali etc and TV commercials as a successful actress. Since 2008, she is playing Madhavi Bhide in Taarak Mehta Ka Ooltah Chashmah opposite Mandar Chandwadkar.

== Filmography ==
=== Television ===
Year	Show	Role	Ref.
2007	Parrivaar - Kartavaya Ki Pariksha		
2008–present	Taarak Mehta Ka Ooltah Chashmah	Madhavi "Madhu" Aatmaram Bhide	
2015	SAB Ke Anokhe Awards	Host	
2021	India's Best Dancer	Guest	
2021	Kaun Banega Crorepati	Guest	
