= Usha Kehar Luthra =

Indian pathologist and cytologist

- Born: 1932 (age 93–94)
- Education: Lady Hardinge Medical College; Delhi University; Dr. Bhimrao Ambedkar University
- Awards: Padma Shri
- Scientific career
- Fields: Pathology; Cytology

Usha Kehar Luthra (born 1932) is an Indian pathologist, and cytologist. She won a 1992 Padma Shri Award.

== Life ==
She graduated from Lady Hardinge Medical College, University of Delhi and from Dr. Bhimrao Ambedkar University, Agra. She is a fellow of the Indian National Science Academy and the National Academy of Medical Sciences.

== Works ==
- Pandol, S. J.; Rodriguez, G; Muallem, S; Mendius, K. E. (1989). "Characteristics of intracellular calcium changes required for augmentation of phorbol ester-stimulated pancreatic enzyme secretion". Cell Calcium. 10 (4): 255–62. doi:10.1016/0143-4160(89)90008-0. PMID 2476234.
- Vooijs, Peter (1996). "Opinion Poll on Quality Assurance and Quality Control". Acta Cytologica. 40 (1): 14–25. doi:10.1159/000333571. ISSN 1938-2650. PMID 8604568.
