= P. V. A. Mohandas =

Indian surgeon

- Born: Palayamkottai, Tirunelveli
- Occupation: Orthopedic surgeon
- Known for: Madras Institute of Orthopaedics and Traumatology
- Spouse: Mallika Mohandas
- Awards: Padma Shri
- Website: miotinternational.com

Pakkiam Vaikundam Arulanandam Mohandas is an Indian orthopedic surgeon from Chennai, Tamil Nadu. He is the founder and Mentor of Madras Institute of Orthopaedics and Traumatology, known as MIOT Hospital. He is a former assistant professor of Orthopedics at Stanley Medical College and former professor at Madras Medical College and Kilpauk Medical College, three of the known medical institutions in Chennai. The Government of India awarded him the fourth highest civilian honour of the Padma Shri in 1992. He is married to Mallika who is the chairman of the MIOT Hospitals.
