= Kanta Tyagi =

Indian social worker

- Born: Madhya Pradesh, India
- Occupation: Social worker
- Known for: Kasturba Vanvasi Kanya Ashram
- Awards: Padma Shri; Janaki Devi Bajaj Award

Kanta Tyagi is an Indian social worker from Madhya Pradesh.

== Life ==
She is director of the Kasturba Vanvasi Kanya Ashram, a non governmental organization based at Nimar which is engaged in services focussed at the economically and socially compromised rural women of Madhya Pradesh. Under the aegis of the organization, she runs a tailoring and knitting school, a condiments and Pappad manufacturing unit and a health centre for tribal women and children. She is the Official representative (Pratinidhi) of the Kasturba Gandhi National Memorial Trust in Niwali, Madhya Pradesh and a member of the Resettlement and Rehabilitation Subgroup for the Sardar Sarovar Project, a part of the Narmada Control Authority (NCA).

She received the Padma Shri, the fourth highest civilian award from the Government of India in 1998 for her services to the rural community. She is also a recipient of the Janaki Devi Bajaj Award (2002) of the Indian Merchants Chambers Ladies’ Wing.

== See also ==
- Sardar Sarovar Dam
