= Konsam Ibomcha Singh =

Manipur Artist

- Born: Manipur, India
- Known for: Artist in a traditional craft of Manipur
- Parents: Ibomcha Singh (father); Konsam Ongbi Gambhini Devi (mother)
- Awards: Padma Shri (2022)

Konsam Ibomcha Singh is Indian artist who makes traditional Laiphadibi dolls and toys in Manipur. He participated in various national exhibitions, is a recipient of the Manipur State award for his contribution in handicraft. He was conferred the Padma Shri Award in March 2022 in Delhi for his pioneering work in Art. For over three decades, he has been crafting dolls, thereby garnering recognition and accolades.

== Early life and career ==
He was born in a culturally blessed family and his father Ibomcha Singh had been a national awardee in the Dolls and Toys category. Konsam Singh's mother Konsam Ongbi Gambhini Devi has also been a national awardee for the famous 'Kauna' craft, an art of making handcrafted items from the water reed grass. Konsam has inherited his parents' skills and adapted his father's techniques, leading to his own recognition with the Manipur State Award.

== Awards ==
- 2022: Awarded the Padma Shri in Delhi by a former President of India, Ram Nath Kovind in the field of Art
- 2021: Received Manipur State award for his contribution in handicraft
