= Kunja Bihari Meher =

Indian weaver (1928–2008)

- Born: 1928; Bargarh district, Odisha, India
- Died: 30 June 2008 (aged 79–80); Barapali, India
- Occupations: Weaver; Master craftsman
- Known for: Nata Sankirtana
- Awards: Padma Shri; National Award for Handicrafts

Kunja Bihari Meher (1928 – 30 June 2008) was an Indian master craftsman and weaver from Odisha. Born in the Bargarh district, he is known for the Ikkat tradition (tie and dye) of weaving, found in the Sambalpuri sarees of Odisha, and is credited with the development of Sambalpuri handloom industry. He was awarded the fourth highest civilian award of the Padma Shri by the Government of India, in 1998. He posthumously won the National Award for Handicrafts of the National Centre for Textile Design in 2009. His son, Surendra Meher, is also a known weaver. Meher died in Barapali on 30 June 2008.
