= Atmaram Bhide =

Fictional character

Atmaram Tukaram Bhide
- Taarak Mehta Ka Ooltah Chashmah character
- First appearance: 2008
- Created by: Asit Kumarr Modi
- Portrayed by: Mandar Chandwadkar

In-universe information
- Nickname: Bhide
- Occupation: Teacher
- Family: Madhvi Bhide (wife); Sonalika Bhide (daughter)
- Religion: Hindu
- Origin: Ratnagiri, Maharashtra, India
- Nationality: Indian

Atmaram Tukaram Bhide is a fictional character in the Indian Hindi-language sitcom Taarak Mehta Ka Ooltah Chashmah. Portrayed by Mandar Chandwadkar, he serves as the secretary of the Gokuldham Society co-operative housing society and works as a mathematics teacher. His character is defined by strict adherence to rules, extreme frugality, and a comically rigid moral compass, traits that have established him as a recognizable and widely discussed figure within Indian popular culture.

== Character development ==
Bhide's character was created by Asit Kumarr Modi as part of the original ensemble cast when the show premiered on 28 July 2008. As the elected secretary of Gokuldham Society, he represents the archetypal rule-following society administrator, embodying characteristics that are both admirable and comically exaggerated for entertainment purposes. His profession as a mathematics teacher further reinforces his methodical and precise nature, creating a character whose obsession with order and rules drives much of the show's comedic conflict.

== Personality and characteristics ==
Bhide's identity revolves around his dual roles as a mathematics teacher and the elected secretary of Gokuldham Society. His personality serves as a significant source of comedy, centering on his penny-pinching nature and unwavering dedication to enforcing society bylaws. These traits frequently bring him into conflict with other residents, most notably Jethalal Champaklal Gada, creating some of the show's recurring comedic scenarios.

A defining aspect of the character is his catchphrase, "Ekameva Secretary" (The one and only Secretary), which he uses to assert his authority within the society. This line was reportedly an improvisation by actor Mandar Chandwadkar that was well-received and subsequently incorporated into the regular script. Another notable element associated with Bhide is his scooter, named "Sakharam", which has become central to numerous plotlines and is frequently referenced by the show's fanbase and in media coverage.

== Portrayal ==
The character is portrayed by actor Mandar Chandwadkar, who made a significant career transition from mechanical engineering in Dubai to pursue acting in Indian television. Chandwadkar's casting came about through a recommendation from actress Sonalika Joshi, who portrays his on-screen wife Madhvi Bhide, demonstrating the collaborative nature of the show's casting process.

Chandwadkar has expressed particular admiration for his co-star Dilip Joshi, who portrays Jethalal, acknowledging the professional significance of working alongside such an established actor. The actor has noted that his improvised dialogue "Ekameva Secretary" becoming a cultural phenomenon demonstrates how organic moments can evolve into defining character elements.

== Cultural impact and reception ==
Chandwadkar's portrayal of Bhide has achieved such widespread recognition that it has resulted in significant typecasting challenges for the actor. He has publicly acknowledged that his primary professional struggle is distinguishing his public identity from that of his fictional character.

The character's popularity extends beyond the television screen, with fans and service providers often addressing Chandwadkar by his character's name in real-life situations. The actor has noted that utility bills and official documents are sometimes addressed to "Atmaram Tukaram Bhide," indicating the character's recognition in everyday contexts. This association extends to Chandwadkar's family, with fans sometimes approaching his real-life wife expecting her to behave like her on-screen counterpart, particularly regarding traditional activities like making pickles and papads.

The character's cultural significance is further demonstrated by fan interactions that frequently reference his scooter "Sakharam," with social media posts and public appearances often generating comments about the fictional vehicle. Major storylines involving Bhide, such as episodes where his scooter goes missing, receive coverage in entertainment news outlets, indicating the character's newsworthiness beyond the show itself.

The character's multimedia presence includes his inclusion as an interactive character in the official Taarak Mehta Ka Ooltah Chashmah mobile game, allowing fans to engage with his persona beyond television viewing. Entertainment critics and television reviewers often cite Bhide as one of the show's most memorable characters, pointing to his unique mannerisms, memorable catchphrases, and consistent characterization across the show's long run.
