= G. N. Malviya =

Indian physician and leprologist

- Born: Madhya Pradesh, India
- Occupation: Leprologist
- Known for: Treatment of Leprosy; Rehabilitation of Leprosy patients
- Awards: Padma Shri; Dr. B. C. Roy Award

Govind Narain Malviya is an Indian physician and leprologist, known for his efforts in the treatment and rehabilitation of Leprosy patients in India. He is the deputy director of the Central JALMA Institute for Leprosy, Agra. Malviya has delivered many award lectures and is the author of several medical papers; ResearchGate, an online repository of scientific papers, have listed 109 of his articles.

== Awards ==
The Government of India awarded him the fourth highest civilian award of Padma Shri in 1991. Nine years later, the Medical Council of India honoured him with Dr. B. C. Roy Award, the highest Indian award in the medical sector.
