= Balendu Prakash =

Indian Ayurveda practitioner (1959–2026)

Vaidya Balendu Prakash
- Born: 14 March 1959; Meerut, Uttar Pradesh, India
- Died: 7 August 2026 (aged 67)
- Other name: Vaidyaji
- Occupation: Ayurveda practitioner
- Spouse: Gopa Indu
- Parent(s): Late .Vaidya Chandra Prakash and Shashi Mukhi
- Awards: 1996 "Uttarakhand Gaurav Samman" 1996 "Pranacharya" 1997 "Doon Ratna" 1998 "National Citizen Award - 1996" 1998 Memento & Civic Reception 1999 PADAMSHREE 2000 "Best Ayurvedic Physician - 98" 2001 "Pride of Doon" 2011 "Bhishak Shree"
- Website: Official website

Vaidya Balendu Prakash (14 March 1959 – 7 August 2026) was an Indian Ayurveda practitioner. He was a physician to the President of India and the founder of Paadav, a specialty Ayurvedic hospital in Dehradun. The Government of India awarded him the fourth highest civilian award of the Padma Shri in 1999.

== Life and career ==
Balendu Prakash was born on 14 March 1959, at Meerut, in the Indian state of Uttar Pradesh, to Vaidya Chandra Prakash, an Ayurveda practitioner. He did his early schooling at Meerut and graduated in Science with Honours (BSc Hons.) after which he secured the Ayurvedic Medicine degree of BAMS (Ayurvedacharya) from Maharshi Dayanand University, Rohtak. It was reported that he learnt Rasa Shastra, a traditional Indian therapeutic protocol, where metal, in powder and paste forms, are used alongside herbs, for the treatment, from his father. In 1989, he moved his base to Dehradun and founded Vaidya Chandra Prakash Cancer Research Foundation (SIROs) for ayurvedic research.

His treatment protocols have been subjected to studies in International Journal of Interdisciplinary and Multidisciplinary Studies in 2014. He had published several articles in alternative medicine research journals about his findings, covering the treatment of cancer and other diseases. In 2000, when he set up a research unit at the Regional Cancer Centre, Thiruvananthapuram, he found it difficult to get patient referrals from medical doctors of the centre. It was also reported that a team of British medical doctors scrutinised Prakash's treatment and his patients in 1990, only to report negatively about the therapeutic efficacy of the treatment.

Prakash was a onetime member of the scientific advisory committee of Central Council for Research in Ayurveda and Siddha (CCRAS) and served as the Honorary Physician to the President of India from 1997 to 2000. He had sat in the Central Council of Indian Medicine and headed the Clinical Research Units of Regional Cancer Centre, Thiruvananthapuram and Shri Dhanvantri Ayurvedic College and Hospital, Chandigarh during the late 1990s and early 2000s. He was a member of the Research Advisory Committee of the Herbal Research Development Institute, Gopeshwar ( a Government of Uttarakhand undertaking) and the Advisory Committee of the National Cancer Control Programme of the Ministry of Health and Family Welfare. He was also a member of the Ayurveda, Siddha and Unani Drugs Technical Advisory Board of the Ministry of AYUSH and International Headache Society, UK and a life member of the Indian Co-operative Oncology Network (ICON).

He was a recipient of several awards and honours such as Uttrakhand Gaurav, Doon Ratan, Ayurveda Chandrodaya, Paranacharya, Vaidya Ratanam, National Citizen Award and Pride of Doon. The Government of India awarded him the civilian honour of the Padma Shri in 1999.

Prakash died on 7 August 2026, at the age of 67.

== Selected bibliography ==
- Vaidya Balendu Prakash (2015). "Positivism: An Approach to Develop Indigenous Medicine". Presentation. World Bank. p. 19.
- Vaidya Balendu Prakash. "Indigenous Approach to Combat Cancer". Health Administrator. XVII (1): 169–171.
- Balendu Prakash (2011). "Treatment of relapsed undifferentiated acute myeloid leukemia (AML-M0) with Ayurvedic therapy". International Journal of Ayurveda Research. 2 (1): 56–59. doi:10.4103/0974-7788.83184. PMC 3157111. PMID 21897645.
- Vaidya Balendu Prakash; Shyam Prakash; Rajesh Sharma & Sanjoy K. Pal. (February 2010). "Sustainable Effect of Ayurvedic Formulations in the Treatment of Nutritional Anemia in Adolescent Students". The Journal of Alternative and Complementary Medicine. 16 (2): 205–211. doi:10.1089/acm.2008.0573. PMID 20180694.
