= Bharatiya Vidya Bhavan =

Indian educational trust

- Bharatiya Vidya Bhavan logo
- Established: November 7, 1938; 87 years ago
- Type: Educational trust
- Location: India
- Award: Gandhi Peace Prize
- Website: http://www.bhavans.info

Bharatiya Vidya Bhavan is an Indian educational trust. It was founded on 7 November 1938 by K. M Munshi, with the support of Mahatma Gandhi. The trust programmes through its 119 centres in India, 7 centres abroad and 367 constituent institutions, cover "all aspects of life from the cradle to the grave and beyond – it fills a growing vacuum in modern life", as Pandit Jawaharlal Nehru observed when he first visited the Bharatiya Vidya Bhavan in 1950.

== Organisation ==
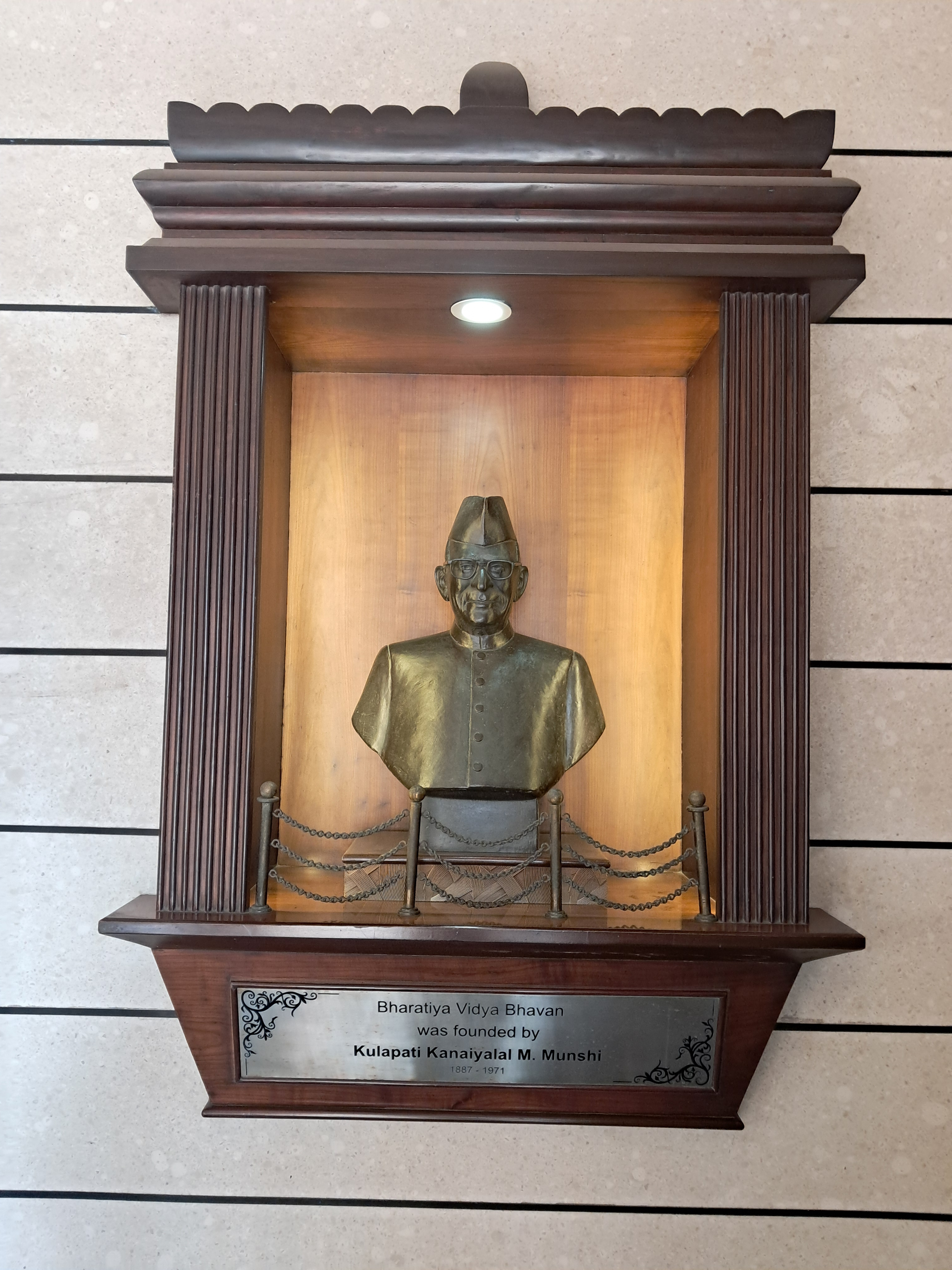
Bust of K. M. Munshi at Bhavan

The trust operates a number of primary and secondary institutes in India and abroad. It organises and runs 100 private schools in India. The schools are known as Bharatiya Vidya Mandir, Bhavan's Vidya Mandir, or Bhavan's Vidyalaya.

The Bhavan significantly grew as a cultural organisation and became a global foundation under the leadership of Sundaram Ramakrishnan who took over as the director after the death of Munshi in 1971. The first foreign centre was opened in London in 1972.

== Book series ==
- Bharatiya Vidya Series
- Bhavan's Book University
- The History and Culture of the Indian People
- Natya, Nritya and Sangita Series
- Pocket Gandhi Series
- Singhi Jain Series

== Board members ==
The current president of the Bhavan is Surendralal Mehta, and the vice-president is Bellur Srikrishna.

== See also ==
- Universities and colleges affiliated with the Bharatiya Vidya Bhavan
