= S. C. Munshi =

Indian cardiologist

- Born: India
- Occupation: Cardiologist
- Awards: Padma Shri; CSI Lifetime Achievement Award

Susil Chandra Munshi is an Indian interventional cardiologist and the Director of the department of Cardiac Research and Education at Jaslok Hospital, Mumbai. He is a Fellow of the American College of Cardiology, Indian College of Cardiology, Royal College of Physicians of Edinburgh, Indian College of Physicians, Cardiological Society of India and the Indian Society of Electrocardiology. He served as the president of the Cardiological Society of India from 1989 to 1990, a member of its panel of national advisors and national faculty and is a recipient of the Lifetime Achievement Award of the society in 2012. The Government of India awarded him the fourth highest civilian award of the Padma Shri, in 1991.
