= Monica Bhide =

American engineer and writer

Monica Bhide (Now writing as Monica Saigal) is an engineer turned writer based out of Washington, D.C. She has written three cookbooks, The Spice is Right, Everything Indian Cookbook, and Modern Spice. Her first fiction novel, The Devil In Us, released in 2014. She released a book of food essays, A Life of Spice, in 2015.

== Early life and personal ==
Monica Saigal Bhide is originally from Delhi, India but has lived in Bahrain and now the United States. She graduated from the Indian School in Bahrain and moved on to Bangalore, India where she completed her engineering degree. She moved to the United States in 1992 and completed her two Master's degrees at George Washington University and Lynchburg College. She worked in corporate America for 10 years before taking up writing full time.

== Awards and recognition ==
Monica has received multiple awards:

The Chicago Tribune named Bhide one of the seven food writers to watch in 2012. In July 2012, Mashable.com picked her as one of the top ten food writers on Twitter. Her work has garnered numerous accolades, including her food essays being included in Best Food Writing anthologies (2005, 2009, 2010, 2014). She has published three cookbooks, the latest being: Modern Spice: Inspired Indian recipes for the contemporary Kitchen (Simon & Schuster, 2009). She conducted an interview on her book Modern Spice which can be found here: Stephen Thompson - Monica Bhide Interview

She has been published in national and international publications including The New York Times;Food & Wine; Cooking Light; Bon Appetit; Saveur; Parents; AARP- The magazine; Eating Well; KIWI; Four Seasons; Spirituality & Health; Prevention; Health; SELF; several “Best Food Writing” anthologies; and is a frequent contributor to NPR's “Kitchen Window.”^{[1]}

Monica is a frequent presence on NPR, serves as a speaker and teacher for organizations such as Georgetown University, the Association of Food Journalists (AFJ), London Food Blogger's Connect and the Smithsonian. Monica Bhide also is a contributing editor to AARP: The Magazine.

Her first fiction short story debuted in Singapore Noir (Akashic Books, 2014) and she has since released her first collection of fiction short stories, titled The Devil in Us: Stories of Love, Life, and Redemption (CreateSpace, 2014). She released a book of her food essays, A Life of Spice, in 2015.

== Bibliography ==
=== Books ===
- The Soul Catcher: A novel (2021) Published by Bodes Well Publishing ISBN 0997662476
- I See You: Observations from the ICU, A Caregiver’s Journey (2018) Published by Bodes Well Publishing ISBN 099766245X
- Karma and the Art of Butter Chicken (2016) Published by Bodes Well Publishing ISBN 0997662417
- The Devil in us : Stories of love, life, and redemption (2014) Published by CreateSpace Independent Publishing Platform ISBN 1502579111
- Modern Spice: Inspired Indian Flavors for the Contemporary Kitchen (2009) Published by Simon & Schuster ISBN 1501100874
- The Everything Indian Cookbook: 300 Tantalizing Recipes - From Sizzling Tandoori Chicken to Fiery Lamb Vindaloo (2004) Published by Adams Media. ISBN 1593370423
- The Spice is Right: Easy Indian Cooking for Today (2001) Published by Callawind Publications. ISBN 1896511171
- A Life of Spice (2015) sold by Amazon Digital Services, Inc.
- In Conversation with Exceptional Women. (ebook)
- Bhide, Monica (Jan–Feb 2013). "Tea here now : find the right tea to soothe yourself, body and soul". Spirituality & Health. 15 (6): 32–33.

=== Articles ===
Food and Wine:

A Passage to Mumbai

Bon Appetit:

Save Your Recipes, Before It's Too Late

Saveur:

Queen of Spices

New York Times:

As Cash Flows In, India Goes Out to Eat
