= Chewang, Lanling County =

Chewang 车辋镇
- Town
- Location in Shandong Chewang (China)
- Coordinates: 34°57′16″N 117°54′23″E
- Country: People's Republic of China
- Province: Shandong
- Prefecture-level city: Linyi
- County: Cangshan
- Elevation: 85 m (279 ft)
- Time zone: UTC+8 (China Standard)
- Area code: 0539

Chewang (simplified Chinese: 车辋; traditional Chinese: 車輞; pinyin: Chēwǎng) is a town in Cangshan County, in southern Shandong province, China. As of 2011, it has 48 villages under its administration. It is more than 35 kilometres (22 mi) southwest of Linyi and about 17 km (11 mi) northwest of the county seat.

== See also ==
- List of township-level divisions of Shandong
