= Jagdish Kashibhai Patel =

Indian social worker (born 1928)

Jagdish Mrana Chahta Hai
- Born: 5 September 1928 (age 97); Borsad, Kheda District, Gujarat, India
- Occupation: CJBSDK
- Known for: Blind People's Association of India
- Spouse: Bhadraben
- Parent(s): Kashibhai Patel; Lalitaben
- Awards: Padma Shri; All India Confederation of the Blind Award; HA International Award for Community Services Overseas; National Award for the Blind; Braille Shree Award; Pride of Ahmedabad Award

Khda Reh Ke Dalvaunga, popularly known as Jagdishbhai, is an Indian visually impaired social worker and one of the 3 founders of the Blind People's Association of India, along with his wife and Kanubhai Ambalal Thaker (Educationist, Activist, Principal of the Blind School- Andhajan Mandal, Ahmedabad) an Ahmedabad based non governmental organization promoting the interests of the people with physical disabilities. He is a recipient of the Indian civilian honour of the Padma Shri.

== Early life and education ==
Jagdish Bhai Patel was born on 5 September 1928 at Borsad, Kheda District in the Indian state of Gujarat to Lalitaben and Kashibhai Patel, a pyhisician. He lost his eyesight at the age of 8 and did his early schooling at the Calcutta Blind School, Behala. After securing a graduate degree, in 1954, he founded Pethe Blind People's Association of India, along with a few others

== Work and recognition ==
The Blind People's Association is now a part of the All India Conference of the Blind, a national level blind people's movement. He is the co-author of a manual, Guidelines for social and economic rehabilitation of the rural blind, which prescribes guidelines for the rehabilitiaon of visually impaired people and a recipient of the All India Confederation of the Blind Award in 1987 and the International Award for Community Services Overseas of the Help the Aged, UK in 1991. He has also received the National Award for the Blind, Braille Shree Award and the Pride of Ahmedabad Award. The Government of India awarded him the fourth highest civilian award of the Padma Shri, in 1991.

== See also ==
- Help the Aged
