= Kanaiyalal Maneklal Munshi =

Indian independence movement activist (1887–1971)

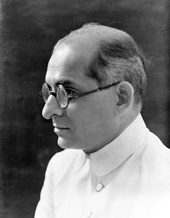
- Munshi in June 1950

Union Minister of Food and Agriculture
- In office 13 May 1950 – 13 May 1952
- Prime Minister: Jawaharlal Nehru
- Preceded by: Jairamdas Daulatram
- Succeeded by: Rafi Ahmed Kidwai

Governor of Uttar Pradesh
- In office 2 June 1952 – 9 June 1957
- Chief Minister: Govind Ballabh Pant; Sampurnanand
- Preceded by: Homi Mody
- Succeeded by: V. V. Giri

Personal details
- Born: 30 December 1887 Bharuch, Bombay Presidency, British India
- Died: 8 February 1971 (aged 83) Bombay, Maharashtra, India
- Party: Swaraj Party, Indian National Congress, Swatantra Party, Jan Sangh
- Spouses: Atilakshmi Pathak (m. 1900; died 1924) Leelavati Sheth (m. 1926)
- Children: Jagadish Munshi, Sarla Sheth, Usha Raghupathi, Lata Munshi, Girish Munshi
- Education: Baroda College
- Occupation: Freedom fighter, politician, lawyer, writer
- Known for: Founder of Bharatiya Vidya Bhavan (1938); Home Minister of Bombay State (1937–40); Agent-General of India in Hyderabad State (1948); Member of the Constituent Assembly of India; Member of Parliament; Minister for Agriculture & Food (1952–53)
- Writing career
- Pen name: Ghanshyam Vyas
- Language: Gujarati, Hindi and English
- Years active: 1915-1970
- Period: Colonial India
- Genres: Mythology, Historical Fiction
- Subjects: Krishna, Indian history
- Notable work: Patan trilogy

Kanaiyalal Maneklal Munshi (pronounced [kə.nəi.ya.lal ma.ɳek.lal mun.ʃi]; 30 December 1887 – 8 February 1971), popularly known by his pen name Ghanshyam Vyas, was an Indian independence movement activist, politician, writer from Gujarat state. A lawyer by profession, he later turned to author and politician. He is a well-known name in Gujarati literature. He founded Bharatiya Vidya Bhavan, an educational trust, in 1938.

Munshi wrote his works in three languages namely Gujarati, English and Hindi. Before independence of India, Munshi was part of Indian National Congress and after independence, he joined Swatantra Party. Munshi held several important posts like member of Constituent Assembly of India, minister of agriculture and food of India, and governor of Uttar Pradesh. In his later life, he was one of the founding members of Vishva Hindu Parishad.

== Early life ==
Munshi was born on 30 December 1887 at Bharuch, a town in Gujarat State of British India in a Bhargav Brahmin family. Munshi took admission at Baroda College in 1902 and scored first class with 'Ambalal Sakarlal Paritoshik'. In 1907, by scoring maximum marks in the English language, he received 'Elite Prize' along with degree of Bachelor of Arts. Later, he was given honoris causa from same university. He received degree of LLB in Mumbai in 1910 and registered as lawyer in the Bombay High Court.

One of his professor at Baroda College was Aurobindo Ghosh (later Sri Aurobindo) who had a profound impression on him. Munshi was also influenced by Maharaja Sayajirao Gaekwad III of Baroda, Mahatma Gandhi, Sardar Patel and Bhulabhai Desai.

== Political career ==
=== Indian independence movement ===
Due to influence of Sri Aurobindo, Munshi leaned towards a revolutionary group and got himself involved into the process of bomb-making. But after settling in the Mumbai, he joined the Indian Home Rule movement and became secretary in 1915. In 1917, he became the secretary of the Bombay presidency association. In 1920, he attended the annual congress session at Ahmedabad and was influenced by its president Surendranath Banerjee.

In 1927, he was elected to the Bombay legislative assembly but after Bardoli satyagraha, he resigned under the influence of Mahatma Gandhi. He participated in the civil disobedience movement in 1930 and was arrested for six months initially. After taking part in the second part of same movement, he was arrested again and spent two years in the jail in 1932. In 1934, he became secretary of Congress parliamentary board.

Munshi was elected again in the 1937 Bombay presidency election and became Home Minister of the Bombay Presidency. During his tenure of home minister, he suppressed the communal riots in Bombay. Munshi was again arrested after he took part in Individual satyagraha in 1940.

As the demand for Pakistan gathered momentum, he gave up non-violence and supported the idea of a civil war to compel the Muslims to give up their demand. He believed that the future of Hindus and Muslims lay in unity in an "Akhand Hindustan". He left Congress in 1941 due to dissents with Congress, but was invited back in 1946 by Mahatma Gandhi.

==== Offices held ====
- Member of Bombay Legislative Assembly
- Member of Working committee of Indian National Congress (1930), Member of All India Congress Committee (1930–36,1947)
- Secretary of Congress Parliamentary Board (1934)
- Home Minister of Government of Bombay (1937–40)

=== Post-independence India ===
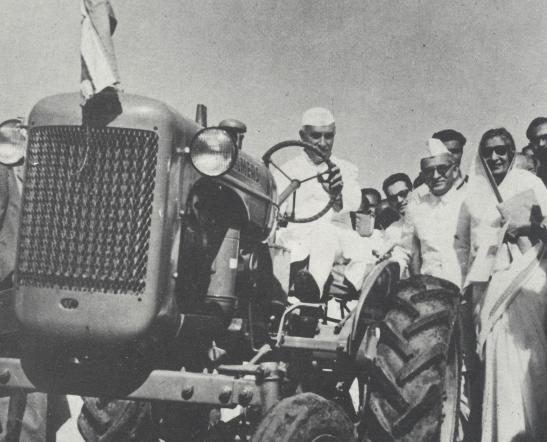
Jawaharlal Nehru driving tractor with Munshi and Rajkumari Amrita Kaur. (From right to left, Munshi wore goggles and Gandhi cap)

He was a part of several committees including Drafting Committee, Advisory Committee, Sub-Committee on Fundamental Rights. Munshi presented his draft on Fundamental Rights to the Drafting and it sought for progressive rights to be made a part of Fundamental Rights.

After the independence of India, Munshi, Sardar Patel and N. V. Gadgil visited the Junagadh State to stabilise the state with help of the Indian Army. In Junagadh, Patel declared the reconstruction of the historically important Somnath temple. Patel died before the reconstruction was completed. Munshi became the main driving force behind the renovation of the Somnath temple even after Jawaharlal Nehru's opposition.

Munshi was appointed diplomatic envoy and trade agent (Agent-General) to the princely state of Hyderabad, where he served until its accession to India in 1948. Munshi was on the ad hoc Flag Committee that selected the Flag of India in August 1947, and on the committee which drafted the Constitution of India under the chairmanship of B. R. Ambedkar.

Besides being a politician and educator, Munshi was also an environmentalist. He initiated the Van Mahotsav in 1950, when he was Union Minister of Food and Agriculture, to increase area under forest cover. Since then Van Mahotsav a week-long festival of tree plantation is organised every year in the month of July all across the country and lakhs of trees are planted.

Munshi served as the Governor of Uttar Pradesh from 1952 to 1957. In 1959, Munshi separated from the Nehru-dominated (socialist) Congress Party and started the Akhand Hindustan movement. He believed in a strong opposition, so along with Chakravarti Rajagopalachari, he founded the Swatantra Party, which was right-wing in its politics, pro-business, pro-free market economy and private property rights. The party enjoyed considerable success and eventually died out.

In August 1964, he chaired the meeting for the founding of the Hindu nationalist organisation Vishva Hindu Parishad at Sandipini ashram.

==== Posts held ====
- Member of constituent assembly of India and its drafting committee (1947–52)
- Union minister of food and agriculture (1950–52)
- Agent general to the Government of India, Hyderabad (1948)

== Academic career ==
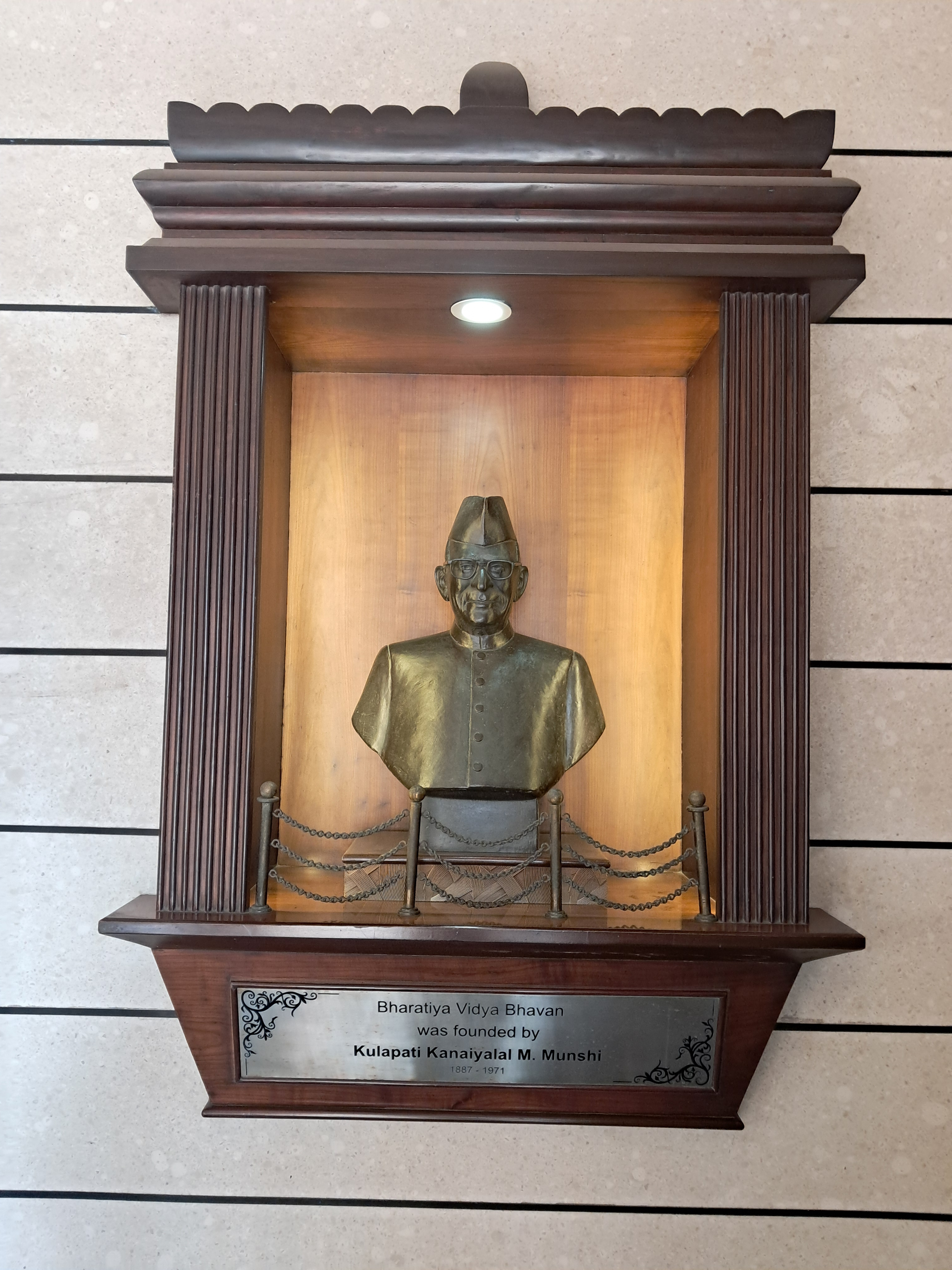
Bust of Munshi at Bharatiya Vidya Bhavan

Munshi was thinking of giving an institutional foundations to his ideas and ideals since 1923. On 7 November 1938, he established Bharatiya Vidya Bhavan with Harshidbhai Divatia and his wife Lilavati Munshi at Andheri, Bombay. Later, he established Mumbadevi Sanskrit Mahavidyalaya to teach Sanskrit and ancient Hindu texts according to traditional methods.

Apart from founding Bharatiya Vidya Bhavan, Munshi was instrumental in the establishment of Bhavan's College, Hansraj Morarji Public School, Rajhans Vidyalaya, Rajhans Balvatika and Panchgani Hindu School (1922). He was elected Fellow of the University of Bombay, where he was responsible for giving adequate representation to regional languages. He was also instrumental in starting the department of Chemical Technology.

He served as Chairman of Institute of Agriculture, Anand (1951–71), trustee of the Birla Education Trust (1948–71), executive chairman of Indian Law Institute (1957–60) and chairman of Sanskrit Vishwa Parishad (1951–1961).

== Global policy ==
He was one of the signatories of the agreement to convene a convention for drafting a world constitution. As a result, for the first time in human history, a World Constituent Assembly convened to draft and adopt the Constitution for the Federation of Earth.

== Literary career and works ==
Munshi, with pen name Ghanshyam Vyas, was a prolific writer in Gujarati and English, earning a reputation as one of Gujarat's greatest literary figures. Being a writer and a conscientious journalist, Munshi started a Gujarati monthly called Bhargava. He was joint-editor of Young India and in 1954, started the Bhavan's Journal which is published by the Bharatiya Vidya Bhavan to this day. Munshi was President of the Gujarati Sahitya Parishad and the Hindi Sahitya Sammelan.

Munshi was also a litterateur with a wide range of interests. He is well known for his historical novels in Gujarati, especially his trilogy Patan-ni-Prabhuta (The Glory of Patan), Gujarat-no-Nath (The Lord and Master of Gujarat) and Rajadhiraj (The King of Kings). His other works include Jay Somnath (on Somnath temple), Krishnavatara (on Lord Krishna), Bhagavan Parasurama (on Parshurama), and Tapasvini (The Lure of Power) a novel with a fictional parallel drawn from the Freedom Movement of India under Mahatma Gandhi. Munshi also wrote several notable works in English.

Munshi has written some fictional historical themes namely; Earlier Aryan settlements in India (What he calls Gaurang's – white skinned), Krishna's endeavors in Mahabharata times, More recently in 10th century India around Gujarat, Malwa and Southern India..

K.M. Munshi's novel Prithivivallabh was made into a movie of the same name twice. The adaptation directed by Manilal Joshi in 1924 was very controversial in its day: the second version was by Sohrab Modi in 1943.

In 1948 he wrote a book about Mahatma Gandhi called Gandhi: The Master.

=== "Pseudo-secularism" ===
According to the Indian lawyer, historian A. G. Noorani, "pseudo-secularism" was coined by K.M. Munshi.

=== Works in Gujarati and Hindi ===
His works are as following:

Novels

- Mari Kamala (1912)
- Verni Vasulat (1913) (under the pen name Ghanashyam)
- Patanni Prabhuta (1916)
- Gujaratno Nath (1917)
- Rajadhiraj (1918)
- Prithivivallabh (1921)
- Svapnadishta (1924)
- Lopamudra (1930)
- Jay Somanth (1940)
- Bhagavan Parashurama (1946)
- Tapasvini (1957)
- Krishnavatara (in eight volumes) (1970)last novel, still remained incomplete
- Kono vank
- Lomaharshini
- Bhagvan Kautilya
- Pratirodha (1900)
- Atta ke svapana (1900)
- Gaurava kā pratīka (1900)
- Gujarat ke Gaurava (1900)
- Sishu aura Sakhi (1961)
- Avibhakta Atma

Drama

- Brahmacharyashram (1931)
- Dr. Madhurika (1936)
- Pauranik Natako

Non-fiction

- Ketlak Lekho (1926)
- Adadhe Raste (1943)

=== Works in English ===
- Gujarat and Its Literature
- Imperial Gujaras
- Bhagavad Gita and Modern Life
- Creative Art of Life
- To Badrinath
- Saga of Indian Sculpture
- The End of An Era
- President under Indian Constitution
- Warnings of History: Trends in Modern India
- Somanatha, The shrine eternal

== Personal life ==
In 1900, he married Atilakshmi Pathak, who died in 1924. In 1926, he married Lilavati Munshi (née Sheth).

== Popular culture ==
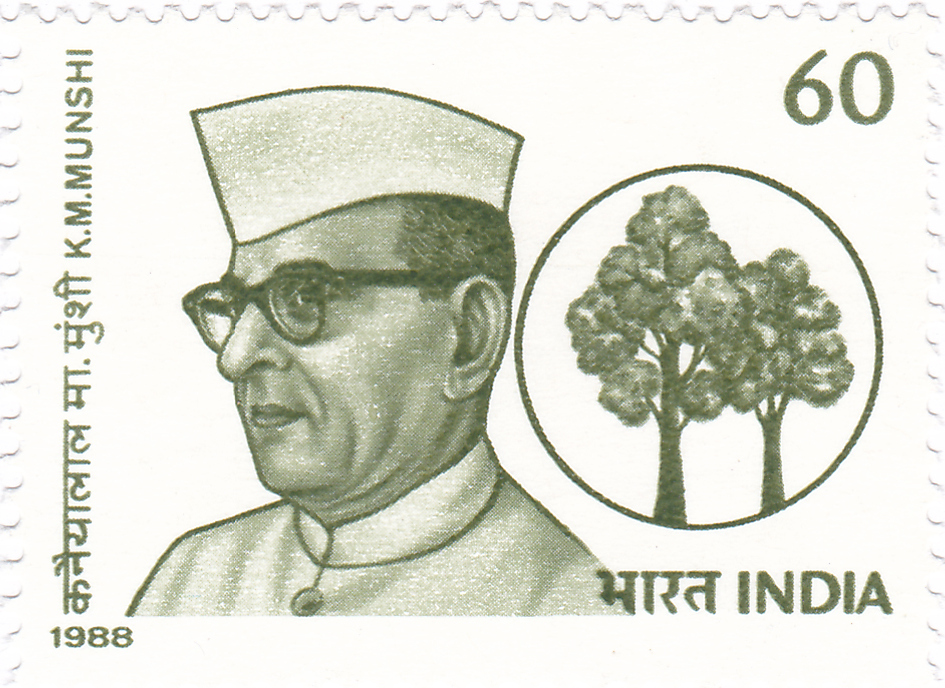
Munshi on a 1988 stamp of India

Munshi was portrayed by K. K. Raina in the Shyam Benegal's mini-series Samvidhaan.

== Memorials ==
- A school in Thiruvananthapuram is named after him as Bhavan's Kulapati K.M. Munshi Memorial Vidya Mandir Sapthat.
- A postage stamp was issued in his honor in 1988.
- The Bharatiya Vidya Bhavan has instituted an award in his honor – The Kulapati Munshi Award – awarded to recognise and honor a citizen of the Kendra who has done excellent and outstanding service to society in any special field.
- A boys hostel named as K. M. Munshi Hall at Main campus, The Maharaja Sayajirao University of Baroda, Vadodara, Gujarat.
