= Atma Ram (politician) =

Afghan politician, minister, and author

- आत्माराम
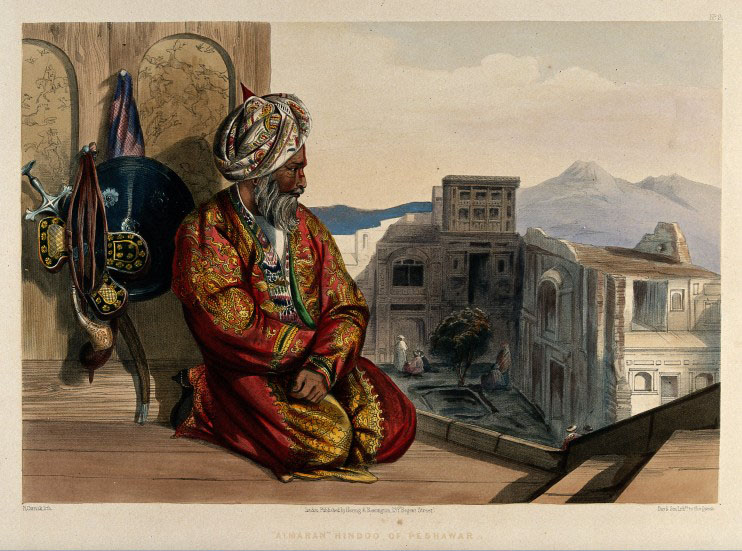
- Lithograph of Atma Ram in Peshawar, circa 1847
- Born: Peshawar, Durrani Empire (Present-day Khyber Pakhtunkhwa, Pakistan)
- Occupation: Minister (government)
- Known for: Dominating trade between India and Turan, tax farming
- Office: Diwanbegi in Kunduz under Murad Beg

Atma Ram was a Hindu minister in Khanate of Kunduz, in modern day Afghanistan, during the 1820s and 1830s. A Peshawari Hindu, he held the office of Diwanbegi in Kunduz under Murad Beg. He was said to have dominated trade between India and Turan in this period. A tax farmer, he purchased the right to collect taxes on the Kabul–Bukhara caravans. Unusually for a Hindu in an Islamic state, he was even permitted to own Muslim slaves.

There is a coloured lithograph of Atma Ram based on the work of James Rattray at the time of the First Anglo-Afghan War (1838–1842).
