= M. N. Passey =

Indian physician (1934–2002)

- Born: 1934; India
- Died: 30 May 2002 (aged 67–68)
- Awards: Padma Shri

Mohinder Nath Passey (1934–2002) was an Indian physician, rheumatologist and an honorary physician to the president of India. He secured his graduate and postgraduate degrees in medicine from Gwalior and started his career as the medical registrar at Irwin Hospital. Moving on to Hindu Rao Hospital in 1964, as a medical specialist, he stayed there until 1985, retiring as the consultant and head of the Department of Medicine. After superannuation, he worked with Mahalaxmi Hospital until his death on 30 May 2002. The Government of India awarded him the fourth highest civilian award of Padma Shri in 1991.
