= Shanthi Ranganathan =

Indian social worker

- சாந்தி ரங்கநாதன்
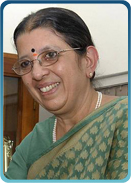
- Ranganathan in c. 2015
- Born: Tamil Nadu, India
- Occupation: Social worker
- Years active: Since 1980
- Known for: Anti substance abuse activities
- Spouse: T. T. Ranganathan
- Awards: Padma Shri; Avvaiyar Award; UN Vienna Civil Society Award

Shanthi Ranganathan (Tamil: சாந்தி ரங்கநாதன்) is an Indian social worker and the founder of T. T. Ranganathan Clinical Research Foundation, a non governmental organization managing the TTK Hospital, a medical centre based in Chennai for the treatment and rehabilitation of drug and alcohol addicts. She is the first recipient of the UN Vienna Civil Society Award and a recipient of the 1992 Padma Shri, the fourth highest civilian award from the Government of India for her contributions to the society.

== Biography ==
Born in the south Indian state of Tamil Nadu and married to T. T. Ranganathan, the grandson of T. T. Krishnamachari, former Finance Minister of India, Ranganathan was widowed in 1979, at the age of 33, when her husband died from health issues related to alcohol addiction. This prompted her to focus her attention to the problem of substance abuse and addiction. In order to prepare herself, Shanthi, holder of a Master's degree in Social Work from the Madras School of Social Work, joined the Hazelden Addiction Treatment Centre, Minneapolis for training in de-addiction programmes and started a day care centre in one of the family properties in Chennai, in 1980. The modest beginning, with a few assistants, grew to become the T. T. Ranganathan Clinical Research Foundation, which now includes TTK Hospital, a 65-bed treatment facility, the first Indian hospital dedicated for the treatment of drug and alcohol addiction. The institution works in coordination with United Nations Office on Drugs and Crime and is a participant of the anti-substance abuse programmes of the Government of India. She is also associated with the Swami Dayananda Saraswati Educational Society, and sits on its board of directors.

The Government of India included her in the 1992 Republic Day Honours list for the civilian award of the Padma Shri. In 1999, when United Nations instituted the United Nations Vienna Civil Society Award, she was selected for the award for her Outstanding Contributions in the Fight Against Drug Abuse and Crime, making her the first recipient of the award. She is the recipient of the Avvaiyar Award by the Government of Tamil Nadu for the year 2015.

== See also ==
- United Nations Office on Drugs and Crime
- Madras School of Social Work
