= Chewang, Sichuan =

Chewang 车辋镇
- Town
- Location in Sichuan
- Coordinates: 28°39′39″N 105°45′20″E
- Country: People's Republic of China
- Province: Sichuan
- Prefecture-level city: Luzhou
- County: Hejiang
- Elevation: 243 m (797 ft)
- Time zone: UTC+8 (China Standard)

Chewang (simplified Chinese: 车辋; traditional Chinese: 車輞; pinyin: Chēwǎng) is a town in Hejiang County, in southeastern Sichuan province, China, located on the eastern (right) bank of the Chishui River (赤水河), located upstream from the county seat, where that river joins the Yangtze, and downstream of Chishui City in Guizhou. As of 2011, it has 1 residential community (社区) and 9 villages under its administration. The town is about 18 kilometres (11 mi) south-southwest of the county seat, Hejiang Town (合江镇), but just under 10 km (6.2 mi) northeast of Chishui City.

== See also ==
- List of township-level divisions of Sichuan
