= J. S. Mahashabde =

Indian ophthalmologist

- Born: Indore, Madhya Pradesh, India
- Occupation: Ophthalmologist
- Children: Sudhir Mahashabde
- Awards: Padma Shri

Janardan Shankar Mahashabde was an Indian ophthalmologist. He was the founder of Mahashabde Netralaya and the Indore Eye Hospital. He was one of the early members of the Indore Divisional Ophthalmologist Society (IDOS). The Government of India awarded him the fourth highest civilian honour of the Padma Shri in 1992. The All India Ophthalmological Society has instituted an award, Mahashabde Award, in memory of the ophthalmologist.
