= Selma D'Silva =

Indian field hockey player

Personal information
- Full name: Selma Juliet Christina D'Silva
- Born: 24 July 1960 (age 66) Mumbai, India

Sport
- Sport: Field hockey
Medal record
Women's field hockey
Representing India
Asian Games
Gold medal – first place	1982 Delhi	Team competition

Selma Juliet Christina D'Silva (born 24 July 1960) is a former player for the Indian Women's Hockey Team. She represented India at the 1980 Summer Olympics and the 1982 Asian Games along with many other international tournaments. She has also been the captain for Indian Women's Hockey Team during the 1983 Woman’s World Cup Kuala Lumpur.

== Early life and education ==
D'Silva was born in Mumbai, and attended Guru Nanak Khalsa College, Matunga.

As of 2013, she was living in Mumbai, India.

== Career in hockey ==
D'Silva played for the Western Railway Woman’s Hockey Team, 1979 - 1996. She represented, Bombay, Western Railway and Indian Railways at various tournaments held all over India during these years.

In 1979 she represented India in the Woman’s World Cup Vancouver - CANADA. In 1980 represented India at the Olympic Games in Moscow. She was on the winning team representing India at the 1981 Asian Women’s Hockey Championship Japan, the 1981 Quadrangular Tournament Singapore, and the 1982I ndo – German Series Germany. She represented India at the 1982 Asian Games New Delhi, and again as captain in 1983 at the World Cup Kuala Lumpur. In 1991 The Padma Shree Award was presented to her by the President of India.

== See also ==
- India at the 1980 Summer Olympics
- Padma Shri Awards (1990–1999)
