= Chewang Phunsog =

Indian Administrative Service Officer

- Born: India
- Occupation: Civil servant
- Awards: Padma Shri; J and K Certificate of Merit; Chief Minister's Gold Medal

Chewang Phunsog is an Indian civil servant and the chairman of the Public Enterprises Selection Board (PESB) of the Government of India. He is a former Chief Secretary of the state of Jammu and Kashmir. Phunsog, an Albert Parvin Fellow at the Woodrow Wilson School, was awarded the fourth highest civilian award of the Padma Shri by the Government of India, in 1998.

== Biography ==
Phunsog, a graduate of mechanical engineering, started his career as a member of faculty at the erstwhile Regional Engineering College, Srinagar (presently National Institute of Technology, Srinagar), in 1968 and worked there as a lecturer for three years when he was admitted into the Indian Administrative Service in 1978. After a year, he took a break and studied Development Economics under Nobel Laureate Arthur Lewis, at the Woodrow Wilson School of the Princeton University, as an Albert Parvin Fellow from 1979 to 1980. Returning to India, he resumed his service in the Jammu and Kashmir cadre where he held several positions such as Sub-district Magistrate, Additional Secretary, District Magistrate, Development Commissioner, Divisional Commissioner, Tourism Secretary and Financial Commissioner before becoming the Principal Secretary of the Home Ministry and finally, the Chief Secretary of the state, a post he held till 2007.

Moving to the Union Ministry as the Deputy Secretary at the Ministry of Industry, he served, later, at other ministries namely the Ministry of Science and Technology (as Director of Biotechnology) and the Ministry of Home Affairs (as Joint Secretary of Internal Security and Human Rights). Before moving to London as the Minister (Economic) in the High Commission of India to the United Kingdom, he also worked as the Joint Secretary at the Prime Minister's Office. In 2008, he was appointed as a member of the Public Enterprises Selection Board (PSEB) where he became the chairman in 2009. During this period, he also worked as the Advisor to the Governor of Jammu and Kashmir for one year when President's rule was imposed in the state. When his term as the chairman of PSEB ended in 2012, he was reappointed for another term by the Government and holds the chair to date. As the chairman, he heads the body which controls the appointments to the Public sector undertakings in India.

Phunsog was honoured with a Certificate of Merit by the Government of Jammu and Kashmir during the Independence day celebrations of 1983. The Government of India awarded him the civilian honour of the Padma Shri in 1998. He also received Chief Minister's Gold Medal and Certificate of Merit from the state government in 2007.

== See also ==
- Woodrow Wilson School
