= K. Ibomcha Sharma =

Indian singer

- Born: Manipur, India
- Other name: Abhiram Shaba
- Occupations: Singer; Performer
- Known for: Nata Sankirtana
- Awards: Padma Shri; Sangeet Natak Akademi Award

Kongbrailatpam Ibomcha Sharma, popularly known as Abhiram Shaba, is an Indian singer and performer from Manipur, who is known for Sankirtan singing (Nata Sankirtana) of Raseshwari Pala, a part of the traditional Manipuri dance. His role as Abhiram Shaba in the Manipuri show, Goura Lilas is reported to have earned him the nickname. He is a former Guru at the Jawaharlal Nehru Manipur Dance Academy and a recipient of the Sangeet Natak Akademi Award in 1981. He was awarded the fourth highest civilian award of the Padma Shri by the Government of India, in 1998.

== See also ==
- Manipuri dance
