= V. G. Bhide =

Indian physicist

- Born: 1925; Nagpur, Maharashtra, India
- Died: June 25, 2006 (aged 80–81)
- Other name: Vishnu Ganesh Bhide
- Occupations: Physicist; Educationist
- Years active: 1956–2006
- Known for: Mossbauer spectroscopy
- Spouse: Prabha
- Children: One son, one daughter
- Awards: Padma Shri; Sir C. V. Raman Award; Meghnad Saha Memorial Award

Vishnu Ganesh Bhide (8 August 1925 – 25 June 2006) was an Indian physicist and educationist, known for his pioneering work on Mossbauer spectroscopy and his contributions to science education in India. He was the scientific advisor to the Government of India during 1973-75 and a member of the International Commission on the Applications of Mossbauer Effect. The Government of India awarded him the fourth highest civilian honour of the Padma Shri in 1992.

== Biography ==
Bhide, born in 1925 in Nagpur, in the western Indian state of Maharashtra, obtained his master's degree in Physics from Rashtrasant Tukadoji Maharaj Nagpur University with first rank and gold medal and secured a doctoral degree from the same university. He started his career at the Institute of Science, Nagpur, in 1956 as a member of the faculty of Physics, but, taking a break, went to the UK to study Solid State Physics and obtained a doctoral degree from the University of London. After his return, he was offered the post as the Head of the department of Physics at the erstwhile Royal Institute of Physics, Mumbai (presently known as the Institute of Science). During this period, he initiated research on Mossbauer spectroscopy, a pioneering effort in India.

After serving as a scientific advisor to the Government of India from 1973 to 1975, he moved the National Physical Laboratory as a Director-Grade scientist where he continued his research on Mossbauer effect as well as on the field of alternate energy sources. In 1982, he shifted to Pune as the chairman and the State Bank of India chair professor of the School of Energy Studies and worked there till 1984 when he was appointed as the vice chancellor of Pune University. After the conclusion of his term in 1988, he worked as the founder director of the Inter-University Consortium for DAE Facilities (IUC-DAEF).

Bhide documented his research by way of several books and scientific articles published in peer reviewed national and international journals. Besides his scientific researches, he is known for his contributions to the field of science education in India. As the chairman of the Physic Study Group, he was involved with the preparation of secondary school text books for the National Council of Educational Research and Training (NCERT). He served as the Chairman of the Asian Working Group on Solar Energy, as the director of the International Solar Energy Society and as a member of the International Commission on the Applications of Mossbauer Effect. He was a member of the editorial boards of journals such as Pramana, Proceedings of Indian National Science Academy and Journal of Physics Education. He was the president of the Indian Science Congress in 1971 and served the Indian National Science Academy as its secretary from 1971 to 1974 and as its treasurer from 1981 to 1984.

Bhide died on 25 June 2006, survived by his wife, Prabha, a son, Anant Vishnu Bhide, who is an industrialist and a daughter, Dr. Vidula.

== Awards and honours ==
Bhide was an elected fellow of the Indian Academy of Sciences (1974), National Academy of Sciences, India, Indian National Science Academy, Maharashtra Academy of Sciences, Indian Cryogenics Council and the Royal Astronomical Society. He delivered several award lectures such as INSA K. Rangadhama Rao Memorial Lecture, Parulekar Memorial Lecture, M. B. Kinkhede Memorial Lecture and Professor V. N. Thatte Memorial Lecture. The Government of India awarded him the civilian honour of the Padma Shri in 1992. He was also a recipient of Sir C. V. Raman Award and Meghnad Saha Memorial Award.

== See also ==
- Mossbauer spectroscopy
- National Physical Laboratory
- Institute of Science
