= Suryadevara Ramachandra Rao =

Indian civil servant

Suryadevara Ramachandra Rao (IAS)
- Born: India
- Other name: S. R. Rao
- Occupation: Civil servant
- Known for: Development of Surat city
- Awards: Padma Shri; Tirupathi Raju Memorial Award

Suryadevara Ramachandra Rao is an Indian civil servant and the former Municipal Commissioner of Surat, a large metropolitan city in the Indian state of Gujarat. He is best known for his developmental efforts during the 1994 epidemic of plague and for transforming it from a dirty city into one of the cleanest and greenest in India, with the city being rated as the second cleanest in India, after Chandigarh, in a survey conducted by the Indian National Trust for Arts and Culture. Later he became the chairman of the Visakhapatnam Port Trust and during his tenure there, the port is reported to have become a major port in India. He also served as the Secretary of the Ministry of Communications and Information Technology and the Ministry of Commerce and Industry. He was awarded the fourth highest civilian award of the Padma Shri by the Government of India, in 1998, making him one of the few civil servants to be awarded Padma honours while in service. He is also a recipient of the Tirupathi Raju Memorial Award.

== See also ==
- Visakhapatnam Port
