= Leonarda Casiraghi =

Italian-Indian social worker

- Born: Angela Casiraghi; 18 October 1922; Biassono, Italy
- Died: 27 August 2011 (aged 88); Dharwad, Karnataka, India
- Citizenship: Italy (former); India
- Occupations: Catholic missionary Social worker
- Years active: 1955–2011
- Known for: Our Lady of Lourdes Charitable Hospital
- Awards: Padma Shri (1998)

Leonarda Casiraghi (born Angela Casiraghi), popularly known as Doddamma, was an Italian-born naturalised Indian Catholic missionary and social worker, known for her medical service in Dharwad, in the south Indian state of Karnataka. She founded a small medical dispensary in Dharwad in 1958, which later grew to become a full-fledged hospital by name, Our Lady of Lourdes Charitable Hospital.

== Life ==
Born in Biassono, Casiraghi joined the Novitiate of Bergamo of the Sisters of Charity at the age of 23. She came to India in 1955 and worked in Mangalore and Hyderabad for three years before founding the medical facility in Dharwad. She then at the time of her vocation decided to take the religious name of Sister Leonarda. A member of the Sisters of Charity of Saints Bartolomea Capitanio and Vincenza Gerosa congregation, she was the administrator of the hospital and its sister concern, Our Lady of Lourdes School of Nursing, since their inception. She was awarded the fourth highest civilian award of the Padma Shri by the Government of India, in 1998, for her services to the society

Casiraghi died on 27 August 2011, at Dharwad.

== See also ==
- Sisters of Charity of Saints Bartolomea Capitanio and Vincenza Gerosa (SCCG)
