= Mandar Chandwadkar =

Indian television actor (born 1976)

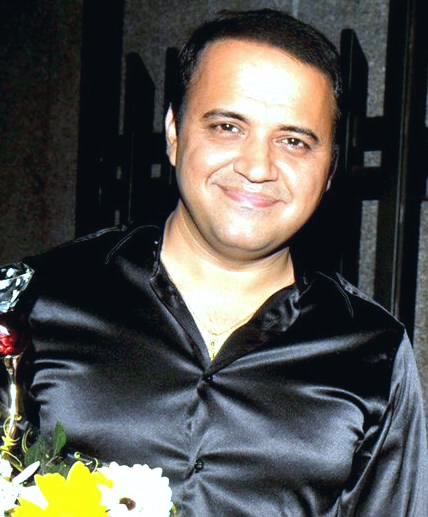
- Chandwadkar in 2013
- Born: 27 July 1976 (age 49); Mumbai, Maharashtra, India
- Education: Guru Nanak Khalsa College of Arts, Science & Commerce
- Occupation: Actor
- Years active: 1998—present
- Known for: Taarak Mehta Ka Ooltah Chashmah
- Spouse: Snehal Chandwadkar (m. 2007)
- Children: 1

Mandar Chandwadkar (born 27 July 1976) is an Indian television and film actor who works in Hindi and Marathi television. He is best known for playing the role of Aatmaram Tukaram Bhide in the Sony SAB's longest running comedy series Taarak Mehta Ka Ooltah Chashmah.

== Early life and education ==
Chandwadkar was born in Marathi family in Mumbai, Maharashtra and attended R.M. Bhatt High School in Parel, Mumbai. He graduated from the Guru Nanak Khalsa College of Arts, Science & Commerce, in Matunga Mumbai. He worked as a mechanical engineer in Dubai for three years (1997–2000). He left the job to pursue a career in acting.

== Personal life ==
He is married to Snehal Chandwadkar, with whom he has a son named Parth.

== Career ==
In 1998, Chandwadkar formed his own theatre groups called Pratibimb and performed in three Hindi / Marathi comedies. He has directed several one-act plays. He has been active in both Hindi and Marathi teleserials and has acted in over 30 of them.

== Filmography ==
=== Films ===
Year	Title	Role	Language
2007	Mission Champion	Athletic coach	Marathi
2008	Doghat Tisra Aata Sagala Visara	Salesman	Marathi
2010	Sasu Numbari Jawai Dus Numbari	Himself	Marathi
2012	Golaberij	Bapu Kane	Marathi

=== Television ===
Year	TV Series	Role	Language	Notes
2004–2007	Vadalvaat	Sandesh Kothare	Marathi	
2005	Don Fool Ek Doubtful	Doctor	Marathi	
2007	Baa Bahoo Aur Baby	Paranjape Saheb	Hindi	
2007	Parrivaar - Kartavaya Ki Pariksha	Radha lover's sister's husband	Hindi	
2008–present	Taarak Mehta Ka Ooltah Chashmah	Aatmaram Tukaram Bhide	Hindi	
2014	C.I.D.	Aatmaram Tukaram Bhide	Hindi	Crossover episodes with Taarak Mehta Ka Ooltah Chashmah.

== Awards ==
Year	Award	Show	Category	Results
2012	Sab Ke Anokhe Awards	Taarak Mehta Ka Ooltah Chashmah	Sab se Anokha Padosi	Won
2019	Indian Telly Awards	Taarak Mehta Ka Ooltah Chashmah	Best Ensemble (fiction)	Won
