= Narinder =

Narinder is a given name. Notable people with the name include:

== Real People ==
- Narinder Kaur Bharaj, Indian politician and lawyer, member of legislative assembly from Sangrur Assembly constituency
- Narinder Biba Punjabi singer from Punjab, India
- Narinder Bragta (1952–2021), Member of the Himachal Pradesh Legislative Assembly for Jubbal-Kotkhai
- Narinder Dhami (born 1958), British children's author
- Narinder Kumar Gupta, research scientist, educator, and engineer
- Narinder Singh Kapany FREng (1926–2020), Indian-American physicist working on fiber optics
- Narinder Singh Kapoor (born 1944), Indian writer from Punjab
- Narinder Kumar Mehra (born 1949), Indian immunologist, head of the department of transplant immunology and immunogenetics
- Narinder Singh Randhawa (1927–1996), Indian agricultural scientist, writer, director general of the Indian Council of Agricultural Research
- Narinder Singh Sandhu MVC (1932–2018), Indian Army officer awarded the Maha Vir Chakra for gallantry, leadership and devotion to duty
- Narinder Pal Singh Sawna, Indian politician in the Punjab Legislative Assembly
- Narinder Kumar Sharma, Indian politician and a member of Shiromani Akali Dal
- Maharaja Narinder Singh KCSI (1824–1862), Maharaja of the princely state of Patiala from 1845 to 1862
- Narinder Singh (cricketer) (born 1954), Indian former cricketer
- Narinder Singh (judoka) (1969–2016), Indian judoka who competed at two Olympic Games
- Narinder Thakur, Indian politician from the Bharatiya Janata Party
- Narinder Nath Vohra (born 1936), the 12th governor of the Indian state of Jammu and Kashmir

== Fictional Characters ==
- Narinder, the final boss of the 2022 indie video game Cult of the Lamb

== See also ==
- Narender
- Narendra (disambiguation)
- Narrandera
