= Narendra Gupta =

Narendra Gupta may refer to:

- Narendra Gupta (actor) (born 1962), Indian actor
- Narendra Gupta (entrepreneur) (a.k.a. Naren Gupta, 1948–2021), Indian-American businessman
- Narinder Kumar Gupta, Indian academic

== See also ==
- Narendra (disambiguation)
- Gupta (disambiguation)
