= Linda Bryant =

New Zealand clinical pharmacist

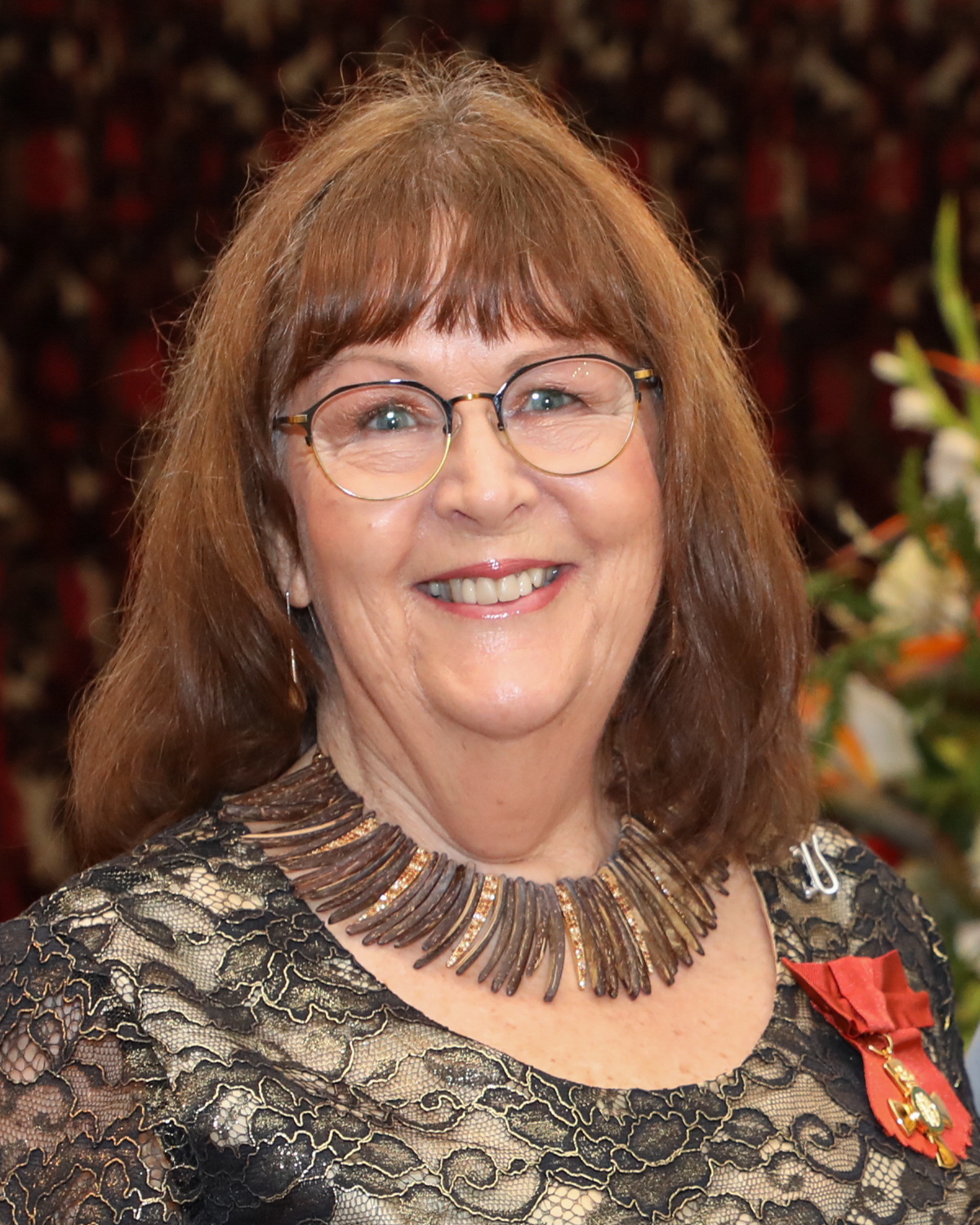
- Bryant in 2022
- Awards: Pharmaceutical Society of New Zealand Gold Medal Award, Officer of the New Zealand Order of Merit

Academic background
- Theses: Effect of a medicines information bulletin / and or a pharmacist facilitator on general practitioner prescribing (1993); Evaluation of the barriers to, and implementation of, comprehensive pharmaceutical care in New Zealand (2006)

Academic work
- Institutions: University of Auckland
- Doctoral students: Natalie Gauld

Linda Julia Morcombe Bryant ONZM is a New Zealand clinical pharmacist. Bryant was awarded a Gold Medal by the Pharmaceutical Society in 2019, and in 2022 she was appointed as an Officer of the New Zealand Order of Merit for services to pharmacy and health.

== Career ==
Bryant is a clinical pharmacist and a prescribing pharmacist. She began working as a hospital pharmacist before moving into primary care. Bryant completed a Master of Pharmacy titled Effect of a medicines information bulletin / and or a pharmacist facilitator on general practitioner prescribing at the University of Otago. She went on to complete a PhD at the University of Auckland, with a thesis on the barriers to and implementation of a comprehensive pharmaceutical care in New Zealand. Bryant lectured at the University of Otago for more than 20 years, and was also an honorary lecturer at the University of Auckland. One of Bryant's notable doctoral students is pharmacist Natalie Gauld.

Bryant was a founder of the Clinical Advisory Pharmacists Association, in 2003, and served as President from 2014 to 2017.

== Honours and awards ==
In 2017 Bryant was awarded an Innovation in Teaching Award at the University of Otago Green Cross Health Pharmacy Awards. Bryant was awarded a Gold Medal by the Pharmaceutical Society in 2019. In 2020 she was awarded the Outstanding Contribution to Health award at the New Zealand Primary Healthcare Awards. She is also a Fellow of the New Zealand Hospital Pharmacists Association, and the New Zealand College of Pharmacists.

In the 2022 New Year's Honours Bryant was appointed as an Officer of the New Zealand Order of Merit for services to pharmacy and health.

== Selected works ==
- Vanessa Selak; Elley, Carolyn Raina; Bullen, Christopher; et al. (2014). "Effect of fixed dose combination treatment on adherence and risk factor control among patients at high risk of cardiovascular disease: randomised controlled trial in primary care". The BMJ. 348 g3318. doi:10.1136/bmj.g3318. PMID 24868083. Wikidata Q42662673.
- Bryant, Linda Julia M.; Gregor Coster; Gamble, Gregory D.; Ross N McCormick (2009). "General practitioners' and pharmacists' perceptions of the role of community pharmacists in delivering clinical services". Research in Social and Administrative Pharmacy. 5 (4): 347–362. doi:10.1016/j.sapharm.2009.01.002. PMID 19962678. Wikidata Q39922507.
- Linda J. M. Bryant; Gregor Coster; Greg D. Gamble; Ross N. McCormick (2011). "The General Practitioner-Pharmacist Collaboration (GPPC) study: a randomised controlled trial of clinical medication reviews in community pharmacy" (PDF). International Journal of Pharmacy Practice. 19 (2): 94–105. doi:10.1111/j.2042-7174.2010.00079.x. PMID 21385240. Wikidata Q37850830.
- Vanessa Selak; Elley, Carolyn Raina; Crengle, Sue; et al. (2011). "IMProving Adherence using Combination Therapy (IMPACT): design and protocol of a randomised controlled trial in primary care". Contemporary Clinical Trials. 32 (6): 909–915. doi:10.1016/j.cct.2011.07.006. PMID 21777702. Wikidata Q43810565.
- Nataly Martini; Bryant, Linda Julia M.; Leanne Te Karu; Lenati Aho; Richard Chan; Jing Miao; Caylee Naidoo; Harjinder Singh; Amanda Tieu (2012). "Living with gout in New Zealand: an exploratory study into people's knowledge about the disease and its treatment". Journal of Clinical Rheumatology. 18 (3): 125–129. doi:10.1097/rhu.0b013e31824e1f6f. PMID 22426580. Wikidata Q46834862.
- Gauld, Natalie Joan; Kelly, Fiona; Nahoko Kurosawa; Bryant, Linda Julia M.; Lynne M Emmerton; Buetow, Stephen A. (2014). "Widening consumer access to medicines through switching medicines to non-prescription: a six country comparison". PLOS One. 9 (9) e107726. Bibcode:2014PLoSO...9j7726G. doi:10.1371/journal.pone.0107726. PMC 4175460. PMID 25251434. Wikidata Q34245674.
