= Narendra Kumar =

Narendra Kumar may refer to:

- Narendra Kumar (police officer) (1979–2012), Indian Police Service officer
- Narendra Kumar (mountaineer) (1933–2020), Indian soldier-mountaineer
- Narendra Kumar (politician), Indian Member of Parliament
- Narendra Kumar (physicist) (1940-2017), Indian theoretical physicist

== See also ==
- Narendra (disambiguation)
- Kumar (disambiguation)
- Narender Kumar Grewal (born 1988), Indian basketball player
- Narinder Kumar Gupta, Indian academic
- Narinder Kumar Mehra (born 1949), Indian immunologist
- Narinder Kumar Sharma, Indian politician
