= Natalie Gauld =

New Zealand pharmacist

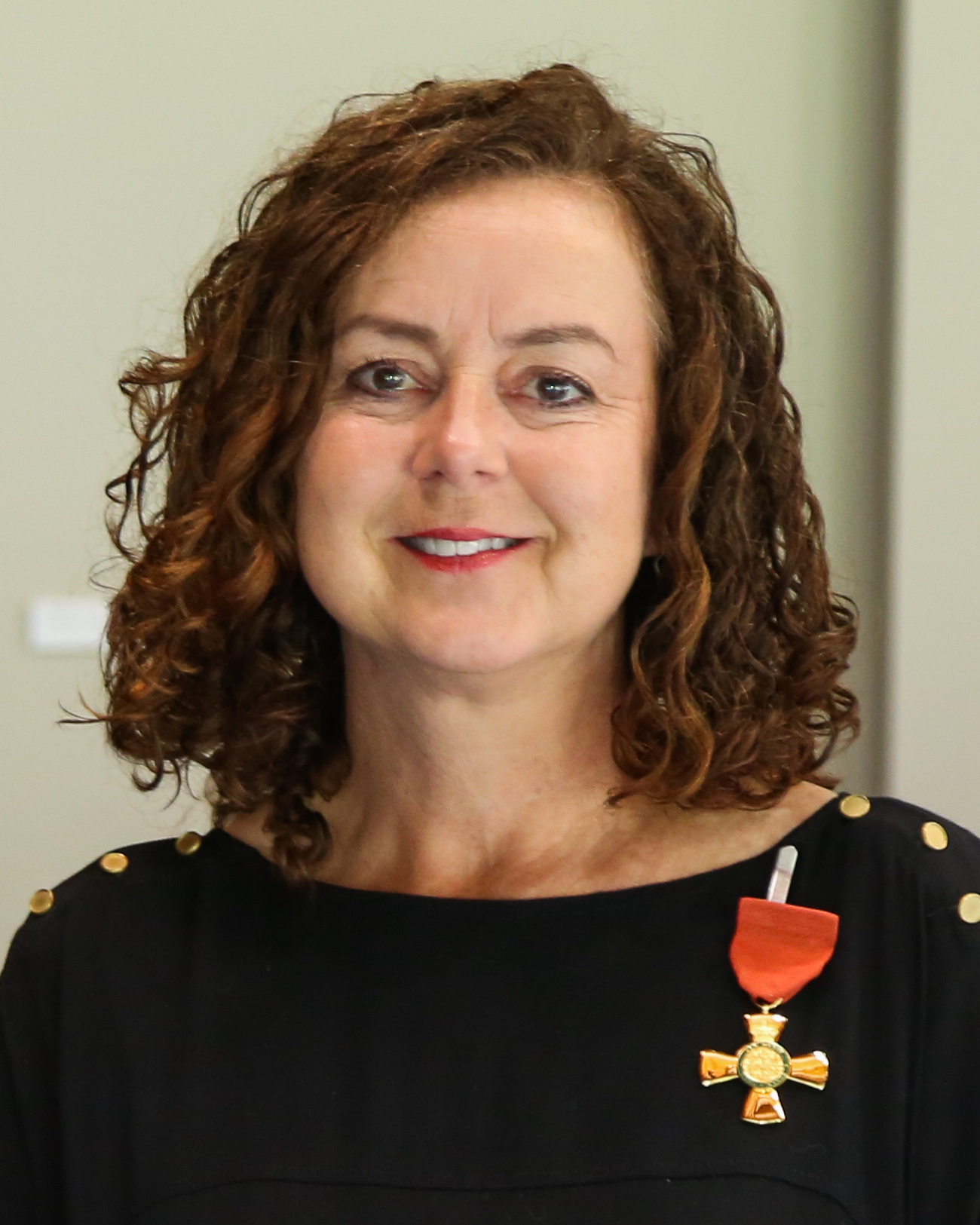
- Awards: Officer of the New Zealand Order of Merit, Pharmaceutical Society of New Zealand Gold Medal Award

Academic background
- Education: University of Auckland
- Thesis: How and why do developed countries vary in reclassifying medicines from prescription to non-prescription? (2013)
- Doctoral advisor: Stephen Buetow, Fiona Kelly, Linda Bryant, Stewart Sinclair Jessamine, Lynne Emmerton

Natalie Joan Gauld ONZM is a New Zealand pharmacist, lecturer and researcher. She was appointed an Officer of the New Zealand Order of Merit for services to pharmacy and health in 2023.

== Academic career ==
Gauld grew up in Taranaki, and studied pharmacy at the Central Institute of Technology (now the Wellington Institute of Technology). Gauld completed a Master of Pharmacy degree at the University of Otago and a PhD titled How and why do developed countries vary in reclassifying medicines from prescription to non-prescription? at the University of Auckland. Gauld is a senior clinical lecturer at the university, and an honorary senior research fellow in the Faculty of Medical and Health Sciences. In March 2022 Gauld was diagnosed with motor neurone disease. At the end of 2023 she was appointed Research Advisor and Best Practice Advocate for the charity Motor Neurone Disease New Zealand.

Gauld has been a principal investigator in several research studies, including research on pharmacy services such as hepatitis C screening and vaccination in pregnancy. Gauld applied to the Medicines Classification Committee to reclassify some medicines, allowing them to be dispensed by pharmacists without prescription. The medications covered included vaccinations, melatonin used for insomnia, some oral contraceptives, and treatments for acne and psoriasis. She has also developed education and screening tools for pharmacists to assist with dispensing reclassified medicines.

== Honours and awards ==
In 2023 Gauld was appointed an Officer of the New Zealand Order of Merit for services to pharmacy and health. She was also awarded the 2022 Pharmaceutical Society of New Zealand Gold Award. She was elected a Fellow of the Pharmaceutical Society of New Zealand. Gauld won the Supreme Award in the 2018 Pharmacy Awards.

== Selected works ==
- Gauld, Natalie (14 June 2023). "Living with motor neurone disease". Pharmacy Today.
- Gauld, Natalie Joan; Kelly, Fiona; Nahoko Kurosawa; Bryant, Linda Julia M.; Lynne M Emmerton; Buetow, Stephen A. (2014). "Widening consumer access to medicines through switching medicines to non-prescription: a six country comparison". PLOS One. 9 (9) e107726. Bibcode:2014PLoSO...9j7726G. doi:10.1371/journal.pone.0107726. PMC 4175460. PMID 25251434. Wikidata Q34245674.
- Gauld, Natalie Joan; Kelly, Fiona; John Shaw (2010). "Is non-prescription oseltamivir availability under strict criteria workable? A qualitative study in New Zealand". Journal of Antimicrobial Chemotherapy. 66 (1): 201–204. doi:10.1093/jac/dkq409. PMID 21051373. Wikidata Q43722275.
- Gauld, Natalie Joan; Jennings, Lance Cordner; Frampton, Christopher; Huang, Sue (2012). "Five years of non-prescription oseltamivir: effects on resistance, immunization and stockpiling". Journal of Antimicrobial Chemotherapy. 67 (12): 2949–2956. doi:10.1093/jac/dks337. PMC 7314044. PMID 22949624. Wikidata Q30420974.
- Gauld, Natalie Joan; Kelly, Fiona; Lynne M Emmerton; Buetow, Stephen A. (2015). "Widening consumer access to medicines: a comparison of prescription to non-prescription medicine switch in Australia and New Zealand". PLOS One. 10 (3) e0119011. Bibcode:2015PLoSO..1019011G. doi:10.1371/journal.pone.0119011. PMC 4364766. PMID 25785589. Wikidata Q35191920.
- Gauld, Natalie Joan; Crystal S Braganza; Ola O Babalola; Tung T Huynh; Hook, Sarah Margaret (2016). "Reasons for use and non-use of the pertussis vaccine during pregnancy: an interview study". Journal of Primary Health Care. 8 (4): 344–350. doi:10.1071/hc15049. PMID 29530159. Wikidata Q53656911.
