= Narendra =

Narendra may refer to:

== Places ==
- Narendra (Karnataka) a village in Dharwad, Karnataka

== People ==
- Narendra Nath Datta, better known as Swami Vivekananda (1863–1902), an Indian Hindu monk
- Narendra Deva (1889–1956), also known as Acharya Narendra Deva, vice-chancellor of Banaras Hindu University.
- Narendra (1912-1951), Indian Air Force officer who died in an aircrash in 1951.
- Narendra Nathwani (1913–1993), Indian politician
- Narendra Nath Wig, better known as N. N. Wig (1930–2018), an Indian psychiatrist, scholar.
- Narendra Dabholkar (1945–2013), Indian medical doctor, rationalist and author
- Narendra Pradhan (born 1947), Indian politician
- Narendra Prasad (1946–2003), actor
- Narendra Singh Negi (born 1949), Indian singer from Uttarakhand
- Narendra Singh Bisht (1915–1984), Indian politician and advocate
- Narendra Modi (born 1950), prime minister of India
- Narendra Karmarkar (born 1955), Indian mathematician
- Narendra Hirwani (born 1968), Indian cricketer
- Narendra Gupta (disambiguation)
- Narendra Kumar (disambiguation)
- Narendra Singh (disambiguation)

== See also ==
- Narinder, alternative spelling of the Indian male given name
- Narender, alternative spelling of the Indian male given name
- Norodom Narindrapong, Cambodian prince
- Narindra Roopnarine, Indian-Trinidadian politician
