= Motor Neurone Disease New Zealand Charitable Trust =

Charity focusing on motor neurone disease

The Motor Neurone Disease New Zealand Charitable Trust (MNDNZ) is an organisation that focuses on improving access to care, research and campaigning for those people living with or affected by motor neurone disease (MND) in New Zealand. MND is also known as amyotrophic lateral sclerosis (ALS) or, in the United States, Lou Gehrig's Disease. MNDNZ is the only national charity in New Zealand that promotes research into the disease and provides support for people affected by MND.

== History ==
In 1985, an article was published in a suburban Auckland newspaper featuring Vera Grant and Ron Jacobs, both of whom had MND. Their goals were to establish a support network in New Zealand for people with MND as no such entity existed at the time. The Motor Neurone Disease Society of New Zealand Incorporated was subsequently established on 21 March 1985. The Society changed its name to the Motor Neurone Disease Association of New Zealand (Incorporated) in 1992.

== Supporters ==
The Association's first Patron was Dr Jonathon Simcock. Former MP Sonja Davies was Patron from 1996 to 2005. Davies' daughter Penny was diagnosed with motor neurone disease in 1990 and died in 1994. Former MP Ruth Dyson QSO became Patron in 2006.

In 2004, Jill Braddick was awarded a Queen's Service Medal for her services in helping to establish the organisation.

== Activities ==
=== Research ===
In 2015, MNDNZ funded a research project led by New Zealander, Dr Gareth Miles, using stem cells grown from patient skin samples.

The New Zealand Motor Neuron (sic) Disease Research Network was created in 2017, part-funded by MNDNZ, to facilitate the interaction between MND biomedical and clinical researchers, allied health professionals, and other researchers whose work is expected to have a beneficial impact on those with MND in New Zealand.

In 2019, MNDNZ contributed funds for research at the Centre for Brain Research at the University of Auckland in support of a genetics study led by Dr. Emma Scotter. The nationwide genetics study seeks to determine whether the high rates of MND in New Zealand are related to unique genetic factors in New Zealanders.

In late 2023, Professor Natalie Gauld was appointed as MNDNZ's Research Advisor and Best Practice Advocate.

=== Care and information ===
MNDNZ provides information and support for patients and their carers through a network of local community groups and regional fieldworkers.

=== Fundraising ===
Fundraising and income-generating activities include an annual ice bucket challenge first held in 2015 in the USA. The challenge raised $35,000 in 2016. In 2016 and in several years subsequently, MNDNZ promoted Walk to D’Feet as a fundraising sponsored walk.

=== Awareness raising ===
MNDNZ promotes the Ice Bucket Challenge and "Cuppa Tea for MND" annually in June to align broadly with Global MND Awareness Day of 21 June.

On 6 September 2021 in the Viaduct Basin, Auckland, Emirates Team New Zealand launched its mono-hull racing boat Te Aihe for the 36th America's Cup race. The early morning ceremony was attended by New Zealand's former Prime Minister Jacinda Ardern and others at which Marcus Gerbich, a member of the MNDNZ, officially named the boat. MNDNZ was Emirates Team New Zealand's official charity at the time.
