= Emma Scotter =

New Zealand medical researcher

- Awards: Rutherford Discovery Fellowship, Member of the New Zealand Order of Merit

Academic background
- Education: University of Auckland

Academic work
- Institutions: University of Auckland, King's College London, University of Waikato

Emma Louise Scotter MNZM is a New Zealand academic neuropharmacologist and Associate Professor at the University of Auckland. In 2024 she was appointed a Member of the New Zealand Order of Merit for services to Motor Neuron Disease research.

== Academic career ==
Scotter completed a PhD in pharmacology at the University of Auckland, working on Huntington's disease. She undertook postdoctoral work at the University of Waikato, and then received an international fellowship to work on motor neuron disease genetics with Professor Chris Shaw at King's College London. Scotter then returned to Auckland as a postdoctoral research fellow, and in 2015 was awarded a Rutherford Discovery Fellowship, for research on the blood-brain-barrier in motor neuron disease (MND). She joined the faculty of the university, rising to Associate Professor. Scotter's team has shown that New Zealand has one of the highest incidences of motor neuron disease in the world. There are around 35 different genes involved in MND, but only around 10 per cent of cases are known to be genetic, and environmental causes are also believed to play a part. Scotter leads a large study into the genetics of the disease in New Zealand, and in one family was able to identify the specific genetic defect involved, allowing family members to be tested. Her research group is trialling treatments, some of which appear to slow or stop the disease progression for some patients.

== Honours and awards ==
In the 2024 King's Birthday Honours, Scotter was appointed a Member of the New Zealand Order of Merit for services to Motor Neuron Disease research.

== Selected works ==
- Younbok Lee; Chen, Han-Jou; Peres, João; et al. (2013). "Hexanucleotide repeats in ALS/FTD form length-dependent RNA foci, sequester RNA binding proteins, and are neurotoxic". Cell Reports. 5 (5): 1178–1186. doi:10.1016/j.celrep.2013.10.049. PMC 3898469. PMID 24290757. Wikidata Q37503127.
- Kearn, Christopher; Blake, Katherine; Scotter, Emma; Mackie, Ken; Glass, Michelle (2005). "Concurrent stimulation of cannabinoid CB1 and dopamine D2 receptors enhances heterodimer formation: a mechanism for receptor cross-talk?". Molecular Pharmacology. 67 (5): 1697–1704. doi:10.1124/mol.104.006882. PMID 15710746. Wikidata Q33211909.
- Smith, Bradley; Ticozzi, Nicola; Fallini, Claudia; et al. (2014). "Exome-wide rare variant analysis identifies TUBA4A mutations associated with familial ALS". Neuron. 84 (2): 324–331. doi:10.1016/j.neuron.2014.09.027. PMC 4521390. PMID 25374358. Wikidata Q35906336.
- Scotter, Emma; Chen, Han-Jou; Shaw, Christopher (2015). "TDP-43 Proteinopathy and ALS: Insights into Disease Mechanisms and Therapeutic Targets". Neurotherapeutics. 12 (2): 352–363. doi:10.1007/s13311-015-0338-x. PMC 4404432. PMID 25652699. Wikidata Q28080628. (Erratum: doi:10.1007/s13311-015-0351-0, PMC 4404465, PMID 25761971, Wikidata Q42602014)
- Scotter, Emma; Vance, Caroline; Nishimura, Agnes; et al. (2014). "Differential roles of the ubiquitin proteasome system and autophagy in the clearance of soluble and aggregated TDP-43 species". Journal of Cell Science. 127 (Pt 6): 1263–1278. doi:10.1242/jcs.140087. PMC 3953816. PMID 24424030. Wikidata Q30574024.
- Scotter, Emma; Abood, Mary; Glass, Michelle (2010). "The endocannabinoid system as a target for the treatment of neurodegenerative disease". British Journal of Pharmacology. 160 (3): 480–498. doi:10.1111/j.1476-5381.2010.00735.x. PMC 2931550. PMID 20590559. Wikidata Q34098196.
