= Rhiannon Braund =

New Zealand academic and pharmacist

- Education: University of Otago
- Awards: Prime Minister's Supreme Award for Tertiary Teaching Excellence
- Scientific career
- Workplaces: University of Otago
- Thesis: Development of a Topical Growth Factor Formulation for Wound Healing (2008)
- Doctoral advisor: Natalie Medlicott

Rhiannon Braund is a New Zealand academic and registered pharmacist. She is a professor and the Head of the School of Pharmacy and Biomedical Science at the University of Waikato

== Academic career ==
Braund completed a BSc, BPharm and PhD (2008) at the University of Otago and is a registered pharmacist. Her doctoral advisor was Natalie Medlicott. In December 2019 she was promoted to full professor at Otago, with effect from 1 February 2020.

== Honours and awards ==
In 2012 Braund received the Prime Minister's Supreme Award for Tertiary Teaching Excellence. In 2018 Braund was elected Fellow of the Pharmaceutical Society of New Zealand and became president of the Society in December 2020.

== Selected works ==
=== Books ===
- Peake, Barrie M.; Braund, Rhiannon; Tong, Alfred Y. C.; Tremblay, Louis A. (2015). The life-cycle of pharmaceuticals in the environment. Amsterdam: Woodhead Publishing. ISBN 978-1-908818-45-4. OCLC 929851505.
- Braund, Rhiannon, ed. (2020). Renal medicine and clinical pharmacy. Cham: Springer. ISBN 978-3-030-37655-0. OCLC 1164583284.

=== Journal articles ===
- Rhiannon Braund; Courtney K Lawrence; Lindsay Baum; Brittany Kessler; Madison Vassart; Coulter, Carolyn (2019). "Quality of electronic records documenting adverse drug reactions within a hospital setting: identification of discrepancies and information completeness". The New Zealand Medical Journal. 132 (1488): 28–37. PMID 31851659. Wikidata Q92085317.
- Sivamanoj Yadav Boyina; Tim Stokes; Angela Renall; Rhiannon Braund (2020). "Clinical pharmacist facilitators in primary care: a descriptive study of their roles and services provided in general practices of southern New Zealand". Journal of Primary Health Care. 12 (1): 88–95. doi:10.1071/hc19073. PMID 32223855. Wikidata Q90729913.
- Nagham J Ailabouni; Hilmer, Sarah Nicole; Lisa Kalisch; Rhiannon Braund; Reeve, Emily (2020). "COVID-19 Pandemic: Considerations for Safe Medication Use in Older Adults with Multimorbidity and Polypharmacy". The Journals of Gerontology. doi:10.1093/gerona/glaa104. PMC 7197623. PMID 32353109. Wikidata Q94468903.
- Caryn Thomas; Rhiannon Braund; Paterson, Helen (2020). "Management of short supply oral contraceptives". The New Zealand Medical Journal. 133 (1519): 128–129. PMID 32777806. Wikidata Q98299996.
- Hunter Robson; Rhiannon Braund; Glass, Michelle; Ashton, Janelle; Tatley, Michael V. (2020). "Synthetic cannabis: adverse events reported to the New Zealand Pharmacovigilance Centre". Clinical Toxicology: 1–8. doi:10.1080/15563650.2020.1828592. PMID 33156704. Wikidata Q101406738.
