= Christopher Shaw =

Christopher Shaw may refer to:

- Christopher Shaw (cricketer) (born 1964), English cricketer
- Christopher Shaw (composer) (1924–1995), British composer
- Christopher Shaw (neurologist) (born 1960)
- Christopher Shaw (neuroscientist), Canadian neuroscientist
- Christopher Shaw of Dubious Brothers
- Christopher W. Shaw (21st century), American historian, author, and policy analyst

== See also ==
- Chris Shaw (disambiguation)
