= Natalie Hughes =

New Zealand pharmaceutical scientist

Academic background
- Education: University of Otago, University of Otago

Academic work
- Institutions: University of Otago, University of Kansas
- Doctoral students: Rhiannon Braund, Vanda Symon

Natalie June Hughes, also known as Natalie Medlicott and Natalie Hughes-Medlicott, is a New Zealand pharmaceutical scientist, and is a full professor at the University of Otago.

== Academic career ==
Hughes gained a Bachelor of Pharmacy at the University of Otago, and worked as a clinical tutor at the university and at Dunedin Hospital while completing her PhD. Her doctoral thesis was titled Controlled delivery of Chlorhexidine for the treatment of periodontal diseases at the University of Otago. After postdoctoral research at the University of Kansas, where she researched anti-cancer drugs, Hughes returned to New Zealand to join the faculty of the University of Otago, rising to full professor in 2022. She is head of clinical pharmacy and associate dean of undergraduate studies, and was deputy dean.

Hughes's research covers pharmaceutical formulation and drug delivery. Hughes and her students have researched delivery of drugs to neonates, the use of ketamine for treatment-resistant anxiety, treatment for wound-healing in dentistry, and the formulation of a saliva replacement for dry-mouth conditions. She has also commented in the media on controversial changes to publicly-funded epilepsy drugs.

== Awards ==
Hughes's research on a new treatment for severe pain was awarded the University of Otago's 2017 translational research grant, allowing Hughes and collaborators Paul Glue and Ailsa McGregor to trial the treatment in human patients.

Hughes was awarded the Best Collaboration Award in the 2019 Health Research Excellence Awards. The award was made for a collaboration between Hughes, Lisa Kremer, David Reith, Roland Broadbent, Liza Edmonds, Frances McCaffrey and Mary–Jane Sime, on a controlled trial on drug administration to neonates.

== Selected works ==
- Charlotte Pinholt; Rune Andersen Hartvig; Medlicott, Natalie; Lene Jorgensen (2011). "The importance of interfaces in protein drug delivery - why is protein adsorption of interest in pharmaceutical formulations?". Expert Opinion on Drug Delivery. 8 (7): 949–964. doi:10.1517/17425247.2011.577062. PMID 21557707. Wikidata Q37873947.
- Medlicott, Natalie; Michael J. Rathbone; Ian G. Tucker; Doug W. Holborow (1994). "Delivery systems for the administration of drugs to the periodontal pocket". Advanced Drug Delivery Reviews. 13 (1–2): 181–203. doi:10.1016/0169-409x(94)90033-7. Wikidata Q124253952.
- Paul Glue; Medlicott, Natalie; Sarah Harland; Shona Neehoff; Bridie Anderson-Fahey; Martin Le Nedelec; Gray, Andrew; Neil McNaughton (2017). "Ketamine's dose-related effects on anxiety symptoms in patients with treatment refractory anxiety disorders". Journal of Psychopharmacology. 31 (10): 1302–1305. doi:10.1177/0269881117705089. PMID 28441895. Wikidata Q38820487.
- Medlicott, Natalie; Niki A Waldron; Todd P Foster (2004). "Sustained release veterinary parenteral products". Advanced Drug Delivery Reviews. 56 (10): 1345–1365. doi:10.1016/j.addr.2004.02.005. PMID 15191786. Wikidata Q35801905.
- R Tantipolphan; Rades, Thomas; McQuillan, James; Medlicott, Natalie (2006). "Adsorption of bovine serum albumin (BSA) onto lecithin studied by attenuated total reflectance Fourier transform infrared (ATR-FTIR) spectroscopy". International Journal of Pharmaceutics. 337 (1–2): 40–47. doi:10.1016/j.ijpharm.2006.12.021. PMID 17240095. Wikidata Q33269903.
- Rhiannon Braund; Hook, Sarah Margaret; Medlicott, Natalie (2007). "The role of topical growth factors in chronic wounds". Current Drug Delivery. 4 (3): 195–204. doi:10.2174/156720107781023857. PMID 17627493. Wikidata Q36879238.
