= Narinder Kumar Mehra =

Indian immunologist (born 1949)

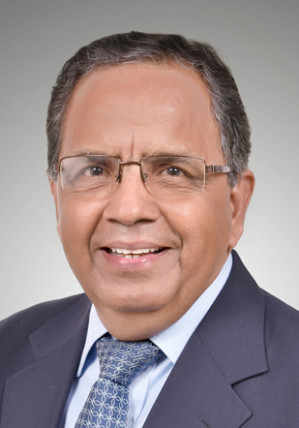
- Narinder Mehra at INSA, 2022.
- Born: 4 November 1949 (age 76); Amritsar, East Punjab, India
- Education: Government Medical College, Amritsar; AIIMS, Delhi; Fred Hutchinson Cancer Research Center
- Known for: Studies on Histocompatibility and Immunogenetics
- Awards: 1977 H. J. Mehta Gold Medal; 1983 ICMR Shakuntala Amir Chand Prize; 1992 Shanti Swarup Bhatnagar Prize; 1995 Sher-I-Kashmir Sheikh Mohammed Abdullah Award; 1996 Ranbaxy Science Foundation Award; 1999 ICMR JALMA Trust Foundation Award; 2000 Om Prakash Bhasin Award; 2003 Chevalier of the National Order of Merit; 2003 Chief of the Army Staff Award; 2004 ICMR Basanti Devi Amir Chand Prize; 2004 Khwarizmi International Award; 2011 Dr. B. R. Ambedkar Centenary Award
- Scientific career
- Fields: Immunogenetics
- Workplaces: SRL ltd, Gurgaon
- Doctoral advisor: Jon van Rood; John A. Hansen

Narinder Kumar Mehra (born 4 November 1949) is an Indian immunologist, head of the department of transplant immunology and immunogenetics of the SRL Limited, Gurgaon. He is a former dean of research and holds the ICMR Dr. C.G. Pandit National Chair at AIIMS. An elected fellow of the International Medical Sciences Academy, The World Academy of Sciences, Indian National Science Academy and National Academy of Sciences, India, Mehra is known for his research on histocompatibility and immunogenetics. The Council of Scientific and Industrial Research, the apex agency of the Government of India for scientific research, awarded him the Shanti Swarup Bhatnagar Prize for Science and Technology, one of the highest Indian science awards for his contributions to Medical Sciences in 1992. He received the Chevalier of the National Order of Merit from François Mitterrand in 2003.

== Biography ==
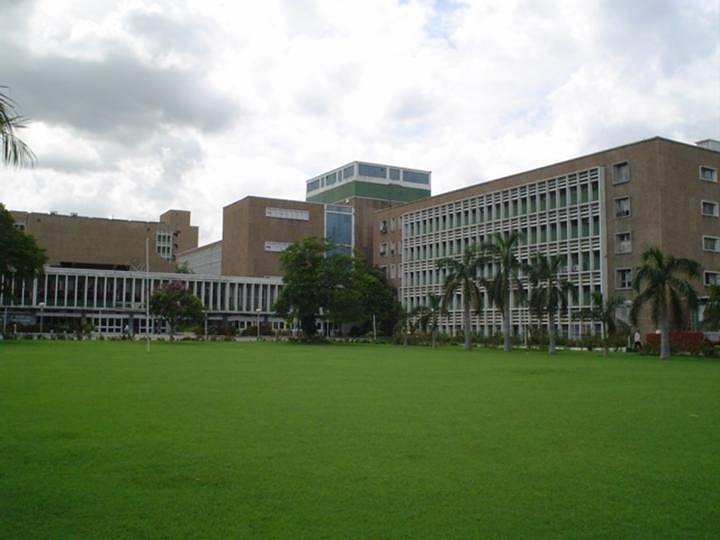
All India Institute of Medical Sciences, Delhi

Born on 4 November 1949 in Amritsar, in the Indian state of Punjab, Mehra did his schooling at Bishop Cotton School, Simla and earned his graduate degree (BSc) with human anatomy, physiology and biochemistry as optional subjects from Government Medical College, Amritsar in 1969 before moving to Delhi to complete his master's degree (MSc) in human anatomy at the All India Institute of Medical Sciences, Delhi (AIIMS). He continued at AIIMS for his doctoral studies and after securing a PhD in 1975 on the immunology of leprosy, did post-doctoral work on histocompatibility and immunogenetics at the laboratory of Jon van Rood in the Netherlands and later with John A. Hansen at Fred Hutchinson Cancer Research Center, Seattle. On his return to India, he joined his alma mater, AIIMS, as a pool officer in 1977. In 1979, he was elevated to lecturer with the additional responsibility of the clinical and research activities of the Histocompatibility Laboratory established under the Department of Anatomy in 1977, the year he joined AIIMS. In 1993, the laboratory, which served as the core laboratory in India for workshops on histocompatibility as well as a base for researches on human leukocyte antigen (HLA), was upgraded to a full-fledged department under the name "Department of Transplant Immunology and Immunogenetics", which he headed as its founding chair, in the capacity of a professor and served out his career at AIIMS in that position. He also served as the member secretary of the Research Advisory Council and chaired the Dean's Research Committee (DRC) at AIIMS. At the time of his official retirement from service in 2004, he was serving as the Dean of Research and post-retirement, he holds the Dr. C. G. Pandit National Chair of the Indian Council of Medical Research (ICMR) at AIIMS, continuing his research at the institution.

Mehra resides in AIIMS Campus, in Ansari Nagar, New Delhi.

== Legacy ==
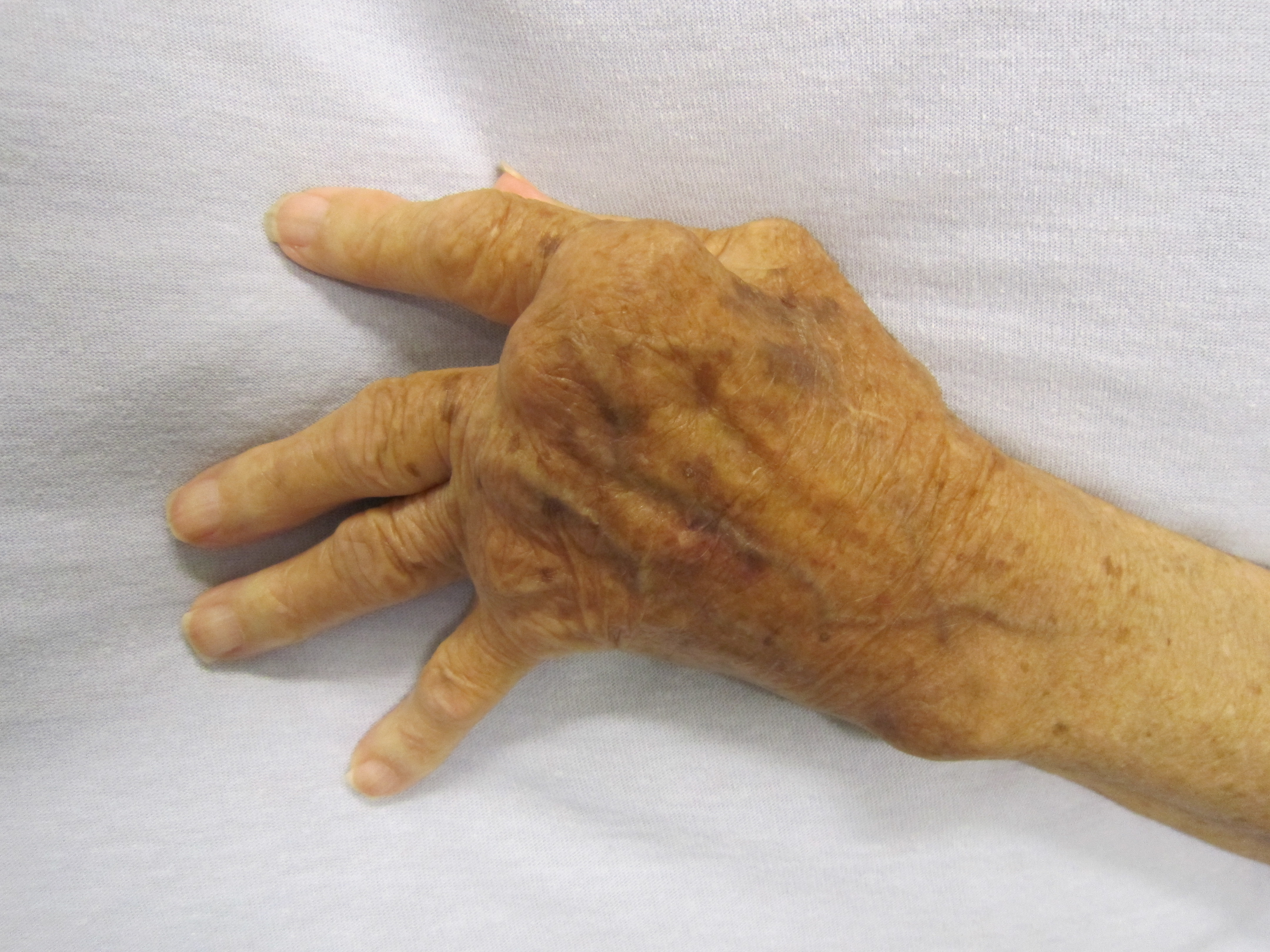
A hand affected by rheumatoid arthritis

Mehra, whose research has covered various aspects of histocompatibility and immunogenetics, started his work on the subjects during his post-doctoral days in Europe, and at John Hansen's laboratory in Seattle, where he used DNA-based technologies of HLA analysis to study the immunogenetic aspects of rheumatoid arthritis. Later, in India, he studied HLA-linked genes and identified that a subtype of HLA-DR2 carried a unique class II haplotype which made humans susceptible to diseases such as leprosy and tuberculosis. He also differentiated the Indian rheumatoid arthritis and insulin-dependent diabetes mellitus patients from the Western Caucasian patients by demonstrating that the former showed a pattern of HLA-DR and HLA-DQ association and these studies helped in characterizing the Indian population with regard to its genomic diversity. His group demonstrated that HLA genes with specific pockets in the peptide binding region controlled the severity of mycobacterial diseases, which was a first-time discovery. Together with Ajay Kumar Baranwal of AIIMS Delhi and Brian D. Tait of the Australian Red Cross Blood Service, he carried out a research project, Antibody Repertoire and graft outcome following solid organ transplantation, which assisted in the prediction of graft rejection and had significance in organ and bone marrow transplantation. He also guided a team of scientists in a project based on polymorphic immunomodulatory genes for developing molecular medicine to combat infectious, autoimmune and rheumatological diseases. His research has been published by way of over 450 articles; (Note: Please see Selected bibliography section) of which 287 are listed by ResearchGate. Besides, he has published a book, The HLA Complex in Biology and Medicine: A Resource Book, and has contributed chapters to books published by other researchers, including Textbook of Biochemistry, Biotechnology, Allied and Molecular Medicine. His researches have been cited by many authors, too.

The All India Institute of Medical Sciences, Delhi established a Histocompatibility Laboratory under its Department of Anatomy in 1977, the year Mehra joined as a pool officer at the institution. Subsequently, he took over the activities of the laboratory and by the time he was promoted to professor in 1993, the laboratory had developed into a referral centre as well as a core laboratory for histocompatibility workshops and AIIMS elevated its status to an independent department, the Department of Transplant Immunology and Immunogenetics, with Mehra as its founding chair. Under the aegis of the new department and in association with Dadhichi Deh Dan Samiti, he established the first Asian Indian Donor Marrow Registry (AIDMR), a database of the donors of bone marrow in India in 1994. He would later explain the details of the registry through an article, Asian Indian donor marrow registry: All India Institute of Medical Sciences experience, published in Transplantation Proceedings in 2007. He has delivered a number of keynote addresses or invited lectures including MedIndia 2003 2013 seminar of human genomics at the Guru Nanak Dev University, 2016 India-Japan Regulatory Symposium, and a Guest lecture series organized by Manipur University in 2016. He has also mentored around 60 masters and doctoral research scholars in their studies.

== Professional associations ==
Mehra is the founding president of the Federation of Immunological Societies of Asia Oceania (FIMSA) and has served as its vice president thereafter. He was also the organizer of the Advanced Course on Basic and Translational Immunology, conducted by FIMSA in collaboration with the International Union of Immunological Societies (IUIS) and Indian Immunology Society (IIS) in March 2012; he has also served as a member of the council of IUIS. He presides over the Indian Society of Histocompatibility and Immunogenetics and was a member of the faculty of the 2016 edition of ISHICON held in December 2016 at Postgraduate Institute of Medical Education and Research, Chandigarh. He sits on the National Board of Advisors of the Center for Stem Cell Science, and the Advisory Board of Indus Foundation and is a trustee of the Board of Immunology Foundation as well as a member of the Publication Advisory Board of the Indian National Science Academy.

Mehra sits on the editorial board of HLA (journal) (formerly known as Tissue Antigens) and is a member of the International Advisory Board of Wiley's journal Modern Rheumatology. He has been associated with journals such as Microbes and Infection of Pasteur Institute, Paris, International journal of Human Genetics and Journal of Clinical Immunology of Springer, as a member of their editorial boards. He is a former member of the ELSI Committee of the Type 1 Diabetes Genetics consortium (T1DGC) of the National Institutes of Health and a former vice president of the Indian Society of Organ Transplantation (ISOT). The invited speeches delivered by him include the first scientific meeting of Allergy and Immunology Society of Sri Lanka (ALSSL) and the Braunschweig Streptococcal colloquium. He has also been a member of the Scientific Advisory Committee of Jalma Institute of Leprosy & Other Mycobacterial Diseases, Task Force on Human Genetics and Human Genome Analysis of Department of Biotechnology and the Task Force on Human Genetics of the Indian Council of Medical Research.

== Awards and honors ==
Mehra received the H. J. Mehta Gold Medal in 1977 and the Shakuntala Amir Chand Prize of the Indian Council of Medical Research in 1983. The Council of Scientific and Industrial Research awarded him Shanti Swarup Bhatnagar Prize, one of the highest Indian science awards in 1992. In 1995, he received the Sher-I-Kashmir Sheikh Mohammed Abdullah Award and Ranbaxy Science Foundation Award the next year. Om Prash Bhasin Foundation awarded him the annual Om Prakash Bhasin Award in 2000 and he received the Chevalier of the National Order of Merit of the Government of France from François Mitterrand in 2003; the same year as he received the Chief of the Army Staff Award. A year later, the Iranian Research Organization for Science and Technology (IROST) of the Government of Iran awarded him the 2004 Khwarizmi International Award. and he received the Basanti Devi Amir Chand Prize of the Indian Council of Medical Research in 2004. The Indian Council of Medical Research honored him again with Dr. B. R. Ambedkar Centenary Award for excellence in biomedical research in 2011.

The National Academy of Sciences, India elected Mehra as a fellow in 1998 and he became a fellow of the Indian National Science Academy in 2008. In between, he received the Tata Innovation Fellowship of the Department of Biotechnology in 2007. The year 2013 brought him the elected fellowship of The World Academy of Sciences as well as the honoris causa membership of the Hungarian Academy of Sciences. He is also a fellow of the International Medical Sciences Academy, Delhi. The award orations delivered by him include the IRA-Boots Oration of 1983, Guru Nanak Dev University Prof G.S. Randhawa Oration of 1996, and the ICMR JALMA Trust Foundation Award Oration of 1999.

== Selected bibliography ==
=== Books ===
- Narinder K Mehra (26 November 2010). The HLA Complex in Biology and Medicine: A Resource Book. Boydell & Brewer Ltd. ISBN 978-81-8448-870-8.

=== Chapters ===
- Ishwar C. Verma (1986). Genetic Research in India. Sagar Printers & Publishers.
- N. K. Mehra (chapter) (2007). "Basic Methods in HLA-DNA technology". Indian Journal of Pathology and Microbiology.
- J.-L. Touraine; R.P. Gale; V. Kochupillai (6 December 2012). Fetal liver transplantation. Springer Science & Business Media. p. 6. ISBN 978-94-009-3365-1.
- Talwar, G.P. (2015). Textbook of Biochemistry, Biotechnology, Allied and Molecular Medicine. PHI Learning Pvt. p. 9. ISBN 978-81-203-5125-7.

=== Articles ===
- N. K. Mehra, Gurinder Kaur, Uma Kanga, Nikhil Tandon (2002). "Immunogenetics of Autoimmune Diseases in Asian Indians". Annals of the New York Academy of Sciences. 958 (1): 333–336. Bibcode:2002NYASA.958..333M. doi:10.1111/j.1749-6632.2002.tb02999.x. PMID 12021136. S2CID 22972522.
- Gurvinder Kaur, Narinder Kumar Mehra (2003). "MHC-based vaccination approaches: progress and perspectives". Expert Reviews in Molecular Medicine. 5 (7): 1–17. doi:10.1017/S1462399403005957. PMID 14987410. S2CID 27017979.
- Kanga U, Panigrahi A, Kumar S, Mehra NK (April 2007). "Asian Indian donor marrow registry: All India Institute of Medical Sciences experience". Transplantation Proceedings. 39 (3): 719–20. doi:10.1016/j.transproceed.2007.01.057. PMID 17445580.
- Neeraj Kumar, Gurvinder Kaur, Narinder Mehra (2009). "Genetic determinants of Type 1 diabetes: immune response genes". Biomarkers in Medicine. 3 (2): 153–173. doi:10.2217/bmm.09.7. PMID 20477508.
- Amal Chandra Kataki, Malcolm J. Simons, Ashok Kumar Das, Kalpana Sharma, Narinder Kumar Mehra (2011). "Nasopharyngeal carcinoma in the Northeastern states of India". Chinese Journal of Cancer. 30 (2): 106–113. doi:10.5732/cjc.010.10607. PMC 4013339. PMID 21272442.
- Neeraj Kumar, Gurvinder Kaur, Nikhil Tandon, Uma Kanga, Narinder K. Mehra (2013). "Genomic evaluation of HLA-DR3+ haplotypes associated with type 1 diabetes". Annals of the New York Academy of Sciences. 1283 (1): 91–96. Bibcode:2013NYASA1283...91K. doi:10.1111/nyas.12019. PMID 23387390. S2CID 22733986.
- Bhargavi Ramanujam, Kavish Ihtisham, Gurvinder Kaur, Shivani Srivastava, Narinder Kumar Mehra, Neena Khanna, Mahip Singh, Manjari Tripathi (2016). "Spectrum of Cutaneous Adverse Reactions to Levetiracetam and Human Leukocyte Antigen Typing in North-Indian Patients". Journal of Epilepsy Research. 6 (2): 89–94. doi:10.14581/jer.16016. PMC 5206105. PMID 28101480.

== See also ==
- List of foreign recipients of the National Order of Merit
- Hematopoietic stem cell transplantation
- Diabetes mellitus type 1
