= Asia Pacific League of Associations for Rheumatology =

Asia Pacific League of Associations for Rheumatology (APLAR) is a federation of organisations of rheumatology. It was established in Sydney in 1963 and the first congress was held in 1968 in Mumbai at the Taj Mahal Palace Hotel.

== History ==
In 1961, the ILAR, International League of Associations of Rheumatology, authorised two Australian rheumatologists to initiate a regional league for Asia Pacific and the organisation, then called SEAPAL was founded in 1963 with four member nations, namely Australia, India, New Zealand and Japan with Dr S Nelson of Australia as the founder President. Over the years the organisation has grown to 27 members including China and Taiwan.

== Organisation ==
APLAR is a confederation of individual Rheumatology Associations that represent different countries of the Asia-Pacific. The office bearers are nominated and elected by the individual member states. The executive consists of the President, Secretary General, Vice President, Treasurer, Deputy Secretary General, immediate past President, President Elect besides the Editor of the association journal (Int J of Rheum Dis). In addition there are subcommittees and special interest groups. The first President of then SEAPAL was Dr S Nelson from Australia while the current President of APLAR is Dr Syed Atiqul Haq from Bangladesh.

== Affiliated National Organisations ==
- Australian Rheumatology Association
- Bangladesh Rheumatology Society
- Chinese Rheumatology Association
- Indian Rheumatology Association
- Japan College of Rheumatology
- Malaysian Society of Rheumatology
- New Zealand Rheumatology Association
- Pakistan Rheumatology Society
- Sri Lanka Association of Rheumatology and Medical Rehabilitation
- Taiwan Rheumatology Association
- Tajikistan Rheumatology Society

== Activities ==
APLAR is actively involved in promoting and nurturing national rheumatology societies in countries where rheumatologists are scarce. It has fostered COPCORD projects in several member countries in association with WHO and ILAR. APLAR has special interest groups in different rheumatic diseases and research areas. The most important activity of APLAR is the Annual Congress that is held in different Asian cities every year.

== Congresses ==
The first SEAPAL Congress was held in 1968 at Mumbai, then Bombay which were held every four years until 2000 when the APLAR Congress became biennial until 2010 before switching to an annual rhythm. List of SEAPAL/APLAR Congresses

- 1968 SEAPAL CONGRESS Mumbai, India
- 1972 SEAPAL CONGRESS Kyoto, Japan
- 1976 SEAPAL CONGRESS Singapore
- 1980 SEAPAL CONGRESS Manila, Philippines
- 1984 SEAPAL CONGRESS Bangkok, Thailand
- 1988 SEAPAL CONGRESS Tokyo, Japan
- 1990 APLAR Symposium Seoul, South Korea
- 1992 APLAR CONGRESS Bali, Indonesia
- 1994 APLAR Symposium Kuala Lumpur, Malaysia
- 1996 APLAR CONGRESS Melbourne, Australia
- 1998 APLAR Symposium Manila, Philippines
- 2000 APLAR CONGRESS Beijing, China (9th)
- 2002 APLAR CONGRESS Bangkok, Thailand
- 2004 APLAR CONGRESS Jeju Island, South Korea
- 2006 APLAR CONGRESS Kuala Lumpur, Malaysia
- 2008 APLAR CONGRESS Yokohama, Japan
- 2010 APLAR CONGRESS Hong Kong
- 2011 APLAR Symposium Taipei, Taiwan
- 2012 APLAR CONGRESS Amman, Dead Sea, Jordan
- 2013 APLAR Symposium Bali, Indonesia
- 2014 APLAR CONGRESS Cebu, Philippines
- 2015 APLAR CONGRESS Chennai, India
- 2016 APLAR CONGRESS Shanghai, China
- 2017 APLAR CONGRESS Dubai, U.A.E.
- 2018 APLAR CONGRESS Kaohsiung, Taiwan
- 2019 APLAR CONGRESS Brisbane, Australia
- 2020 APLAR CONGRESS Virtual
- 2021 APLAR CONGRESS Virtual
- 2022 APLAR CONGRESS Hong Kong
- 2023 APLAR CONGRESS Chang Mai, Thailand
- 2024 APLAR CONGRESS Singapore

== Journal ==
The league publishes its APLAR Journal of Rheumatology in the International Journal of Rheumatic Diseases, a peer-reviewed medical journal.
