= Australian Rheumatology Association =

Nonprofit organization in Sydney, Australia

The Australian Rheumatology Association is an association of rheumatologists in Australia. It is a specialty society of the Royal Australasian College of Physicians and a member of the Asia Pacific League of Associations for Rheumatology.
