= Japan College of Rheumatology =

Japan College of Rheumatology (JCR) is an association of physicians, scientists and academic scholars for studying and promoting the understanding and treatment of Rheumatic diseases in Japan. It organises an annual meeting and publishes the academic journal Modern Rheumatology. It is a member organisation of Asia Pacific League of Associations for Rheumatology (APLAR).
