= Clinical Rheumatology =

- Discipline: Rheumatology
- Language: English
- Edited by: Carlos Pineda

Publication details
- History: 1945-present
- Publisher: Springer Science+Business Media
- Frequency: Monthly
- Impact factor: 2.980 (2020)

Standard abbreviations
- ISO 4: Clin. Rheumatol.

Indexing
- CODEN: CLRHD6
- ISSN: 0770-3198 (print); 1434-9949 (web)
- LCCN: 82005139 sc 82005139
- OCLC no.: 08661865

Links
- Journal homepage; Online archive

Clinical Rheumatology is a peer-reviewed medical journal covering rheumatology. It is published by Springer Science+Business Media on behalf of the International League of Associations of Rheumatology. The journal was established in 1945 as the official journal of the Belgian Rheumatology Society and carried different titles before obtaining its current title in 1982.

According to the Journal Citation Reports, the journal has a 2020 impact factor of 2.980.
