= African League of Associations for Rheumatology =

Organisation of African professional bodies

The African League of Associations for Rheumatology (AFLAR) is an organisation of member Rheumatology professional bodies from the African continent and is a partner in the International League of Associations of Rheumatology (ILAR).

AFLAR publishes the African Journal of Rheumatology twice a year.
