= National Institute of Technology, Srinagar =

Institute in Srinagar, Jammu and Kashmir

National Institute of Technology Srinagar
- Emblem of NIT Srinagar
- Former name: Regional Engineering College Srinagar
- Motto: तमसो मा ज्योतिर्गमय
- Motto in English: Lead me from Darkness to Light
- Type: Public technical university Deemed university
- Established: 1960; 66 years ago
- Chairperson: Dr. Milind Pralhad Kamble
- Director: Prof. Anurag Misra
- Academic staff: 150+
- Students: 3845
- Undergraduates: 3045
- Postgraduates: 416
- Doctoral students: 384
- Location: Srinagar, Kashmir, Jammu and Kashmir, 190006, India; 34°7′30″N 74°50′23″E
- Campus: Urban
- Website: nitsri.ac.in

National Institute of Technology Srinagar (NIT Srinagar or NITSRI) is a public technical university located in Srinagar, Jammu and Kashmir, India. It is one of the 31 National Institutes of Technology (NITs) and, as such, is directly under the control of the Ministry of Education (MoE). It was established in 1960 as one of several Regional Engineering Colleges established as part of the Second Five-Year Plan (1956–61) by the Government of India. It is governed by the National Institutes of Technology Act, 2007, which has declared it an Institute of National Importance.

NIT Srinagar admits its undergraduate students through the Joint Entrance Examination (Mains), previously AIEEE. It has 12 academic departments covering Engineering, Applied Sciences, Humanities, and Social Sciences programs. Also, the medium of instruction is English. Prof. Anurag Misra is an academic administrator currently serving as the director of the National Institute of Technology Srinagar. He is known for his contributions to the field of education, as well as his leadership in advancing the educational and research initiatives at NIT Srinagar.

== History ==
NIT Srinagar was established in 1960 as the Regional Engineering College, Srinagar. The first chairman was Wajahat Habibullah IAS (2004–2014). It was one of the first eight Regional Engineering Colleges established by the Government of India during the first Five-Year Plan. The institute shifted to its present campus in 1965. The Regional Engineering College, Srinagar, was upgraded to become the National Institute of Technology, Srinagar, in July 2003. In the same year, the institution was granted Deemed University status with the approval of the University Grants Commission, All India Council of Technical Education, and the Government of India. On 15 August 2007, it became an Institute of National Importance under the NIT Bill passed by the parliament of India.

== Location ==
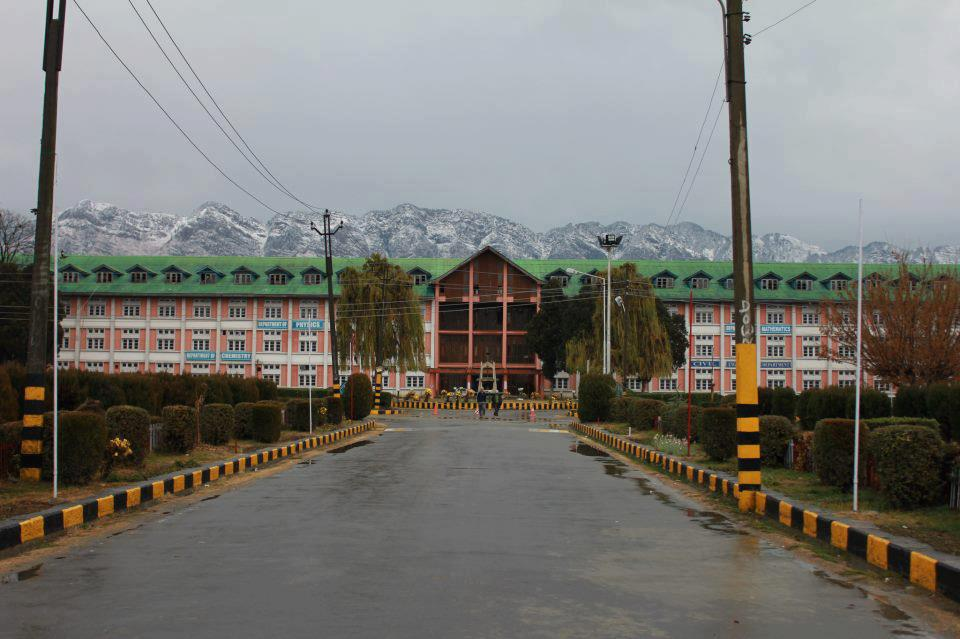
NIT Srinagar Academic Block

The institute is located on the western bank of Dal Lake near the Hazratbal Shrine in the north eastern region of Srinagar city. The institute is located 23 km from the Srinagar International Airport and 13 km from Srinagar railway station.

== Admissions ==
The admissions to undergraduate through the Joint Entrance Examination (Main) (JEE-Main) or Direct Admission of Students Abroad (DASA) (through SAT), for non-resident Indians. Admission to postgraduate courses is done based on Graduate Aptitude Test in Engineering (GATE) scores, through Centralized Counselling for M.Tech. (CCMT) for M.Tech. Courses and though Joint Admission Test for M.Sc. for M.Sc. courses in physics, mathematics and chemistry. An MSc course in Technology Innovations and Entrepreneurship Dynamics is also offered.

== Academics ==
The university includes eight engineering departments, for Chemical Engineering, Civil Engineering, Computer Science and Engineering, Electrical Engineering, Electronics and Communication Engineering, Mechanical Engineering, Metallurgical and Materials Engineering, and Information Technology, as well as four Physical Sciences departments for Physics, Chemistry, Humanities, and Mathematics.

== Rankings ==
University rankings

General – India
- NIRF (Overall) (2024): 101-150

Engineering – India
- NIRF (2024): 79
- India Today (2024): 33

NIT Srinagar is ranked 73rd among the engineering colleges of India by the National Institutional Ranking Framework (NIRF) in 2025. In "India Today's Annual Rankings 2025", NIT Srinagar was ranked 32nd among engineering colleges in India.

== Campus and student life ==
The NIT campus is located on the bank of Dal Lake. Hazratbal Shrine is at a walkable distance from the institute. The campus consists of academic buildings, student hostels with hostel accommodation for only non-locals, and some far-flung areas of the valley. However, there are no residential facilities for PhD Scholars. The Health Centre provides medical care to students, teachers, staff, and family members.

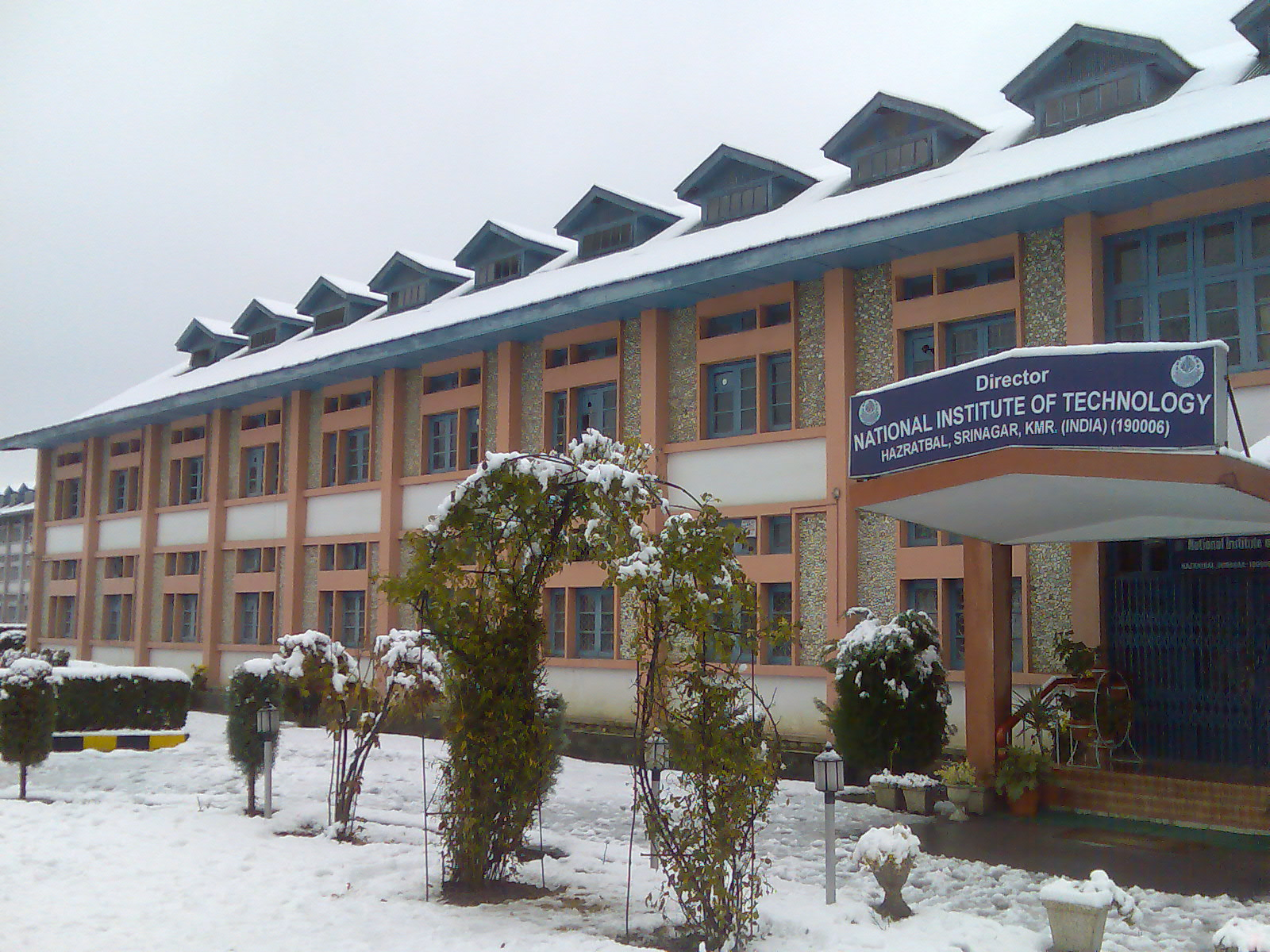
Closer view of NIT Srinagar

The Central Library is automated and provides services seven days a week, catering to more than 3500 users belonging to 12 departments and centers. The library houses 75,000 books.

There are a campus-wide fibre optic and Wi-Fi network, which covers all the departments, teachers' quarters, and students' hostels. There are a central computer lab and computer labs in each Departments. Institute is also part of high speed National Knowledge Network.

The Institute provides separate hostels for the male and female students with separate mess facilities. There are also guesthouses available to meet additional temporary housing needs.

Halls of residence

- Indus Boys Hostel (for 1st year B.Tech. students).
- Chenab Boys Hostel (for 2nd year B.Tech. students)
- Tawi Boys Hostel (for M.Tech and Ph.D. students)
- Mansar and Manasbal hostel( For 3rd Year B.Tech. Students)
- Jehlum Boys Hostel (for 4th year B.Tech. students)
- 8-Block Dal Boys' Hostel (For 4th and 3rd-year B.Tech. Students)

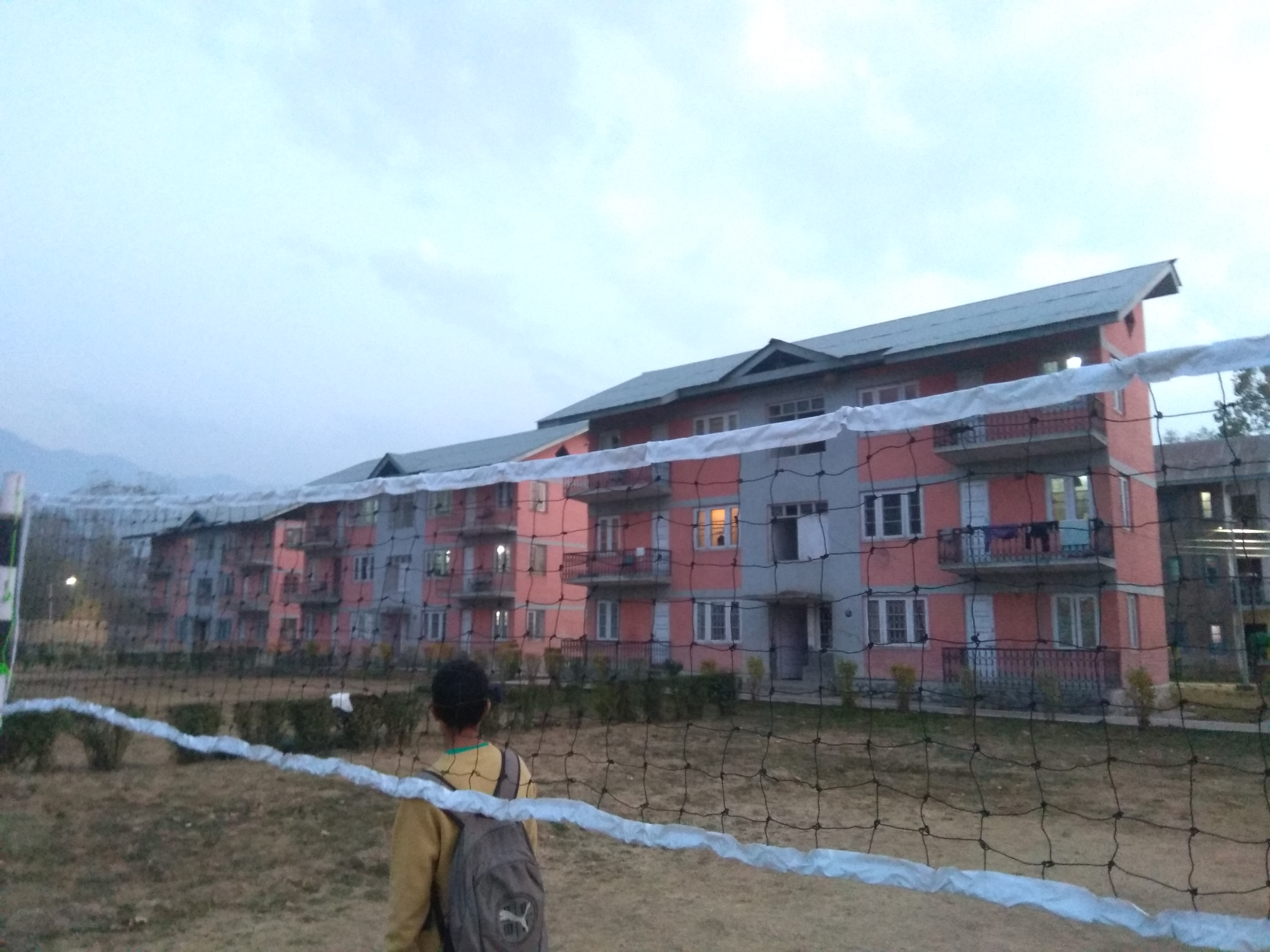
Dal Hostel

- Dal Extension ' Hostel (Renovated)
- Girls' Hostel (Combined for B.Tech., M.Tech.) (All Years)

For the first three years of Btech, each hostel room is shared by five students each while in the 4th year, each student is allotted a single room in the Jhelum hostel. The rooms in the Jhelum hostel are allotted based on CGPA(up to the 5th semester). The students who are not able to get a single room in the Jhelum hostel are allotted the Dal hostels, where the students reside in the ratio of 2 students per room. The M-tech students and Ph.D. scholars are allotted the Tawi hostel during their stay on the campus. In the Tawi hostel, each room is shared by three students.

There is a Common Hall, adjacent to the hostels, which provides facilities for indoor games like table tennis and carom, along with a gymnasium. The institute has a Maintenance Engineering Centre set up under the Indo-Italian collaboration. The center caters to the maintenance engineering needs of the Institute and the region as a whole in respect of research, consultancy, and academics.

=== Technical Festival ===
Techvaganza is the National Level Technical Festival (Tech-Fest) of NIT Srinagar. It usually occurs in the month of April every year. 3. Techvaganza is a national level technical festival held annually at National institute of technology Srinagar in Srinagar. It is the first Techno-Management festival in region.

== Notable alumni ==
- Subhash Kak, Computer Scientist, Regents Professor, and an Ex Head of Computer Science Department at Oklahoma State University, Stillwater
- Vijay Vaishnavi, Computer Information Systems Researcher and Scholar
- Mansoor Ali Khan, Member of the 13th Lok Sabha
- Davoud Danesh-Jafari, Minister of Economy and Finance Affairs of Iran.
- Narinder Kumar Gupta, Academic and Padma Shri Awardee.
- Sonam Wangchuk, Engineer, innovator and education reformist
- Shehla Rashid, social activist, author and former leader of Jawaharlal Nehru University Students' Union.

== See also ==
- 2016 NIT Srinagar Student Protests
- Indian Institutes of Technology
- Indian Institute of Science
- Indian Institutes of Management
- University of Kashmir
- Srinagar
