= Community Oriented Program for Control of Rheumatic Diseases =

WHO celebrated 1977 as the World Rheumatism year and this resulted in a dialogue between ILAR and WHO that led to the idea of COPCORD, Community Oriented Program for Control of Rheumatic Diseases as a joint project between WHO and ILAR. COPCORD promotes low cost epidemiological research in developing countries and has contributed to the understanding of disease burden in data poor regions It has centers in 21 developing countries and has resulted in 102 peer reviewed international publications.
