= Journal of Clinical Rheumatology =

- Discipline: Rheumatology
- Language: English
- Edited by: Graciela S. Alarcón

Publication details
- Frequency: 8/year
- Impact factor: 1.897 (2018)

Standard abbreviations
- ISO 4: J. Clin. Rheumatol.

Indexing
- ISSN: 1076-1608 (print); 1536-7355 (web)

Links
- Journal homepage

Journal of Clinical Rheumatology is a peer reviewed and indexed medical journal in the field of clinical rheumatology, published by PANLAR, Panamerican League of Associations for Rheumatology.
