= Chris Shaw =

Chris Shaw may refer to:

- Chris Shaw (photographer) (born 1961), English documentary photographer
- Chris Shaw (musician), drummer and synthesizer player
- Chris Shaw (baseball) (born 1993), baseball player
- Chris Shaw (hardcore musician), bassist
- Chris Shaw (recording engineer), American record producer and engineer

== See also ==
- Christopher Shaw (disambiguation)
