= 2016 NIT Srinagar Student Protests =

The 2016 NIT Srinagar Student Protests were a series of protests and rallies at the National Institute of Technology, Srinagar, which erupted in April 2016 after a T20 cricket match between India and West Indies on 31 March.
