= Panamerican League of Associations for Rheumatology =

The Pan-American League of Associations for Rheumatology (PANLAR) is a non-profit organization composed of rheumatology associations from North, Central, and South America. The organization's main objective is to promote and advance the knowledge, education, research, and care in the field of rheumatology in the Americas. The mission of PANLAR is to stimulate, promote, and support research, the prevention, treatment, and rehabilitation of rheumatic illnesses. (1).

The Pan American League of Associations of Rheumatology (PANLAR), founded in 1943, gathers the scientific societies of rheumatology, health professionals related to rheumatic illnesses, and rheumatic patient associations of all countries in the Americas (2).

PANLAR hosts various scientific meetings, workshops, and courses for healthcare professionals involved in the care of patients with rheumatic diseases. These events aim to provide a platform for the exchange of ideas and knowledge among rheumatology experts and foster the development of new research.

In addition to its educational initiatives, PANLAR supports the development of guidelines and protocols for the diagnosis and management of rheumatic conditions. The organization collaborates with other rheumatology organizations worldwide and advocates for the advancement of rheumatology care and research.

Overall, PANLAR is committed to improving the quality of life for people with rheumatic diseases in the Americas through education, research, and advocacy.

The Association has organized an annual meeting and published 2020 a new peer-reviewed journal Global Rheumatology by PANLAR (E-ISSN: 2709-5533). The Journal of Clinical Rheumatology became the official journal of the league in 2001. PANLAR is a partner organization of ILAR, International League of Associations of Rheumatology.

PANLAR is organized through four geographical areas (1):

== North Zone ==
Canada, Mexico, United States

== Central and Caribbean Zone ==
Costa Rica, Cuba, Dominican Republic, El Salvador, Guatemala, Honduras, Nicaragua, Panama

== Bolivarian Zone ==
Bolivia, Colombia, Ecuador, Peru, Venezuela

== Southern Cone Zone ==
Argentina, Brazil, Chile, Paraguay, Uruguay

== Early years ==
In 1941, Dr. Aníbal Ruiz Moreno together with Dr. Fernando Herrera Ramos, submitted the idea of an ILAR regional league to Ralph Pemberton, then president of ILAR. In 1942, by request of Pemberton, the ARA accepted the proposal set forth by the South American doctors.(2) A committee comprising doctors Russell Cecil, Robert Osgood, Ralph Boots, Loring Swain, Paul Holbrook, and future Nobel Prize winner Philip Hench gave its final agreement and, soon afterward, with support from physicians in Canada, Chile, Brazil, and Mexico, a path had been cleared to the creation of a society that grouped all rheumatologists in the continent. The committee suggested the creation of a provisional board to draw its charter, with Ruiz Moreno as president, Herrera Ramos as secretary, Richard Freyberg, from the U.S., as vice president, and Wallace Graham, from Canada, as treasurer.

On May 31, 1944, after two years of hard work by the committee, the Pan-American League for the Study and Control of Rheumatic Disease came into existence. A few days later, its name would be changed to the Pan-American League Against Rheumatism (PANLAR). A month later, Loring T. Swain, the first person to hold the position of secretary, announced its foundation to the medical community in the U.S. and abroad. In a letter addressed to the editor of JAMA, he wrote: “On June 15, I received a letter from Dr. Aníbal Ruiz Moreno of Buenos Aires, who has been chosen as the provisional director of the PANLAR committee, duly signaling that our Pan-American league is a reality.” (3)

PANLAR would become the first ILAR regional league. Its first president was Dr. Ralph Pemberton, who acted as such until he died in 1949. Dr. Ruiz Moreno followed suit between 1949 and 1953, while his friend Dr. Herrera Ramos headed the institution between 1955 and 1959. The first Pan-American Congress of Rheumatology was held in Rio de Janeiro and Sao Paulo in 1955 at the Copacabana, it featured an audience of 239 from 15 countries and provided an image of high quality and excellent organization.

== PANLAR today ==
PANLAR continues to be a leading organization in the field of rheumatology, with a focus on promoting research, education, and advocacy in Latin America. As of 2023, the organization boasts members from 21 countries and has established partnerships with several national and international organizations in the field. PANLAR also organizes an annual congress, which is the largest rheumatology event in the region and attracts a global audience of healthcare professionals, researchers, and patients." (4,5,6)

== Journal ==
The Journal of Clinical Rheumatology became the official journal of the league in 2001. In 2020 PANLAR launched its journal Global Rheumatology as an official publication of the League.

== Presidents ==
There have been a total of 22 presidents of PANLAR, with the majority of them being from the United States (8) and Argentina (4). Other countries represented include Brazil (3), Peru (2), Canada (2), Mexico (2), Uruguay (2), Chile (1), Colombia (1), and Guatemala(1). (7)

1944 – 1949 RALPH PEMBERTON, (EEUU)

1949 – 1953 ANIBAL RUIZ MORENO, (Argentina)

1953 – 1955 RICHARD FREYBERG, (EEUU)

1955 – 1959 FERNANDO HERRERA RAMOS, (Uruguay)

1959 – 1963 WALLACE GRAHAM, (Canadá)

1963 – 1967 PEDRO NAVA, (Brasil)

1967 – 1970 RICHARD SMITH, (EEUU)

1970 – 1974 FERNANDO VALENZUELA, (Chile)

1974 – 1978 PINDARO MARTINEZ-ELIZONDO, (México)

1978 – 1982 OSVALDO GARCIA MORTEO, (Argentina)

1982 – 1986 LAWRENCE SHULMAN, (EEUU)

1986 – 1990 ADIL MUHIB SAMARA,(Brasil)

1990 – 1994 DUNCAN GORDON, (Canadá)

1994 – 1998 HUGO JASIN, Argentina (EEUU)

1998 – 2002 ABRAHAM GARCIA KUTZBACH, (Guatemala)

2002 – 2006 ANTONIO REGINATO,* Chile (EEUU)

2006 – 2008 JUAN ANGULO SOLIMANO, (Perú)

2008 – 2010 LUIS ESPINOZA, Perú (EEUU)

2010 – 2012 ANTONIO XIMENES (Brasil)

2012 – 2014 JOHN REVEILLE. (EEUU)

2014 – 2016 CARLOS PINEDA VILLASEÑOR (México)

2016 – 2018 CARLO VINICIO CABALLERO URIBE (Colombia)

2018 - 2020 ENRIQUE SORIANO (Argentina)

2020 - 2022 CARLOS LOZADA (EEUU)

2022 - 2024 MIGUEL ALBANESE (Uruguay )

2024 - 2026 ANTONIO CACHAFEIRO (Panamá)

== Panamerican Congresses ==
The first PANLAR Congress was hosted by Brazil in 1955 and was held jointly in Rio de Janeiro and Sao Paulo. Since then, the Panamerican congress has become the main educational activity of PANLAR, with a total of 24 congresses held in several countries throughout the Americas. Since 2019, the Panamerican Congress of Rheumatology has become an annual activity, which reflects the growing importance and influence of PANLAR in the field of rheumatology in the Americas. (1,7)

- I Río de Janeiro y Sao Paulo, Brasil 1955
- II Washington, EEUU 1959
- III Viña del Mar 1963
- IV Ciudad de México 1967
- V Punta del Este, Uruguay 1970
- VI Toronto, Canadá 1974
- VII Bogotá, Colombia 1978
- VIII Washington, EEUU 1982
- IX Buenos Aires, Argentina 1986
- X Guadalajara. México 1990
- XI Recife, Brasil 1994
- XII Montreal, Canadá 1998
- XIII Aruba 2002
- XIV Lima Perú 2006
- XV Ciudad de Guatemala 2008
- XVI Santiago de Chile 2010
- XVII Punta Cana Rep. Dom. 2012
- XVIII Punta del Este Uruguay 2014
- XIX Panamá, Panamá 2016
- XX Buenos Aires, Argentina 2018

Annual Congress

- 21 Quito, Ecuador 2019
- 22 Virtual 2020 (Covid pandemics)
- 23 Virtual 2021 (Covid Pandemics)
- 24 Miami, EEUU 2022
- 25 Rio de Janeiro, Brasil 2023
- 26 Barranquilla , Colombia 2024
- 27 Ciudad de México, México 2025
