= Narender Singh =

Narender Singh may refer to:

- Narender Pal Singh (born 1973), Indian cricketer for Hyderabad
- Narenderpal Singh (1923–2003), Indian novelist
- Narender Singh (Delhi cricketer) (born 1987), Indian cricketer
- Narender Singh (judoka) (1969–2016), Indian judoka
- Narender Singh Yadav (born 1994), Indian mountaineer

== See also ==
- Narendra Singh (disambiguation)
- Narinder Singh of Patiala, Maharaja of Patiala from 1845 to 1862
- Narinder Singh Kapany (1926–2020), Indian physicist
- Narinder Singh Kapoor (born 1944), Indian writer
- Narinder Singh Sandhu (1932–2018), Indian Army officer
- Narinder Singh Raina, Indian politician
- Narinder Singh Randhawa (1927–1996), Indian agricultural scientist, director general of the Indian Council of Agricultural Research (ICAR)
