= Vijay Vaishnavi =

Georgian computer scientist (born 1948)

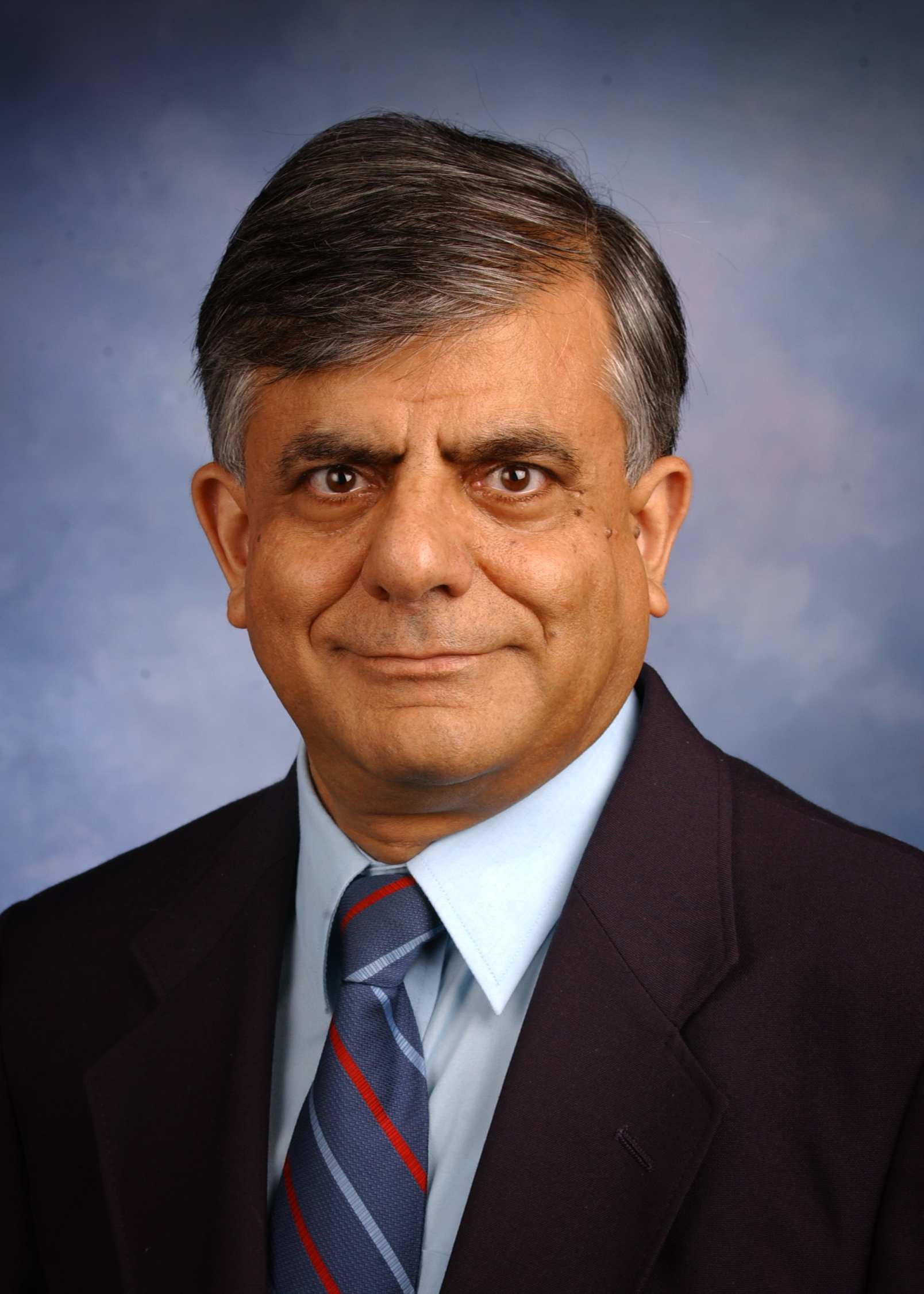
- Born: 1948 (age 77–78)
- Education: IIT Kanpur, NIT Srinagar
- Awards: IEEE Fellow (2002); Fulbright Fellow (2004; 2010)
- Scientific career
- Fields: Computer information systems
- Workplaces: Georgia State University
- Doctoral advisor: Sanat K. Basu
- Website: vijayvaishnavi.wordpress.com

Vijay Kumar Vaishnavi is a noted researcher and scholar in the computer information systems field with contributions mainly in the areas of design science, software engineering, and data structures & algorithms, authoring over 150 publications including eight books in these and related areas, and co-owning a patent. He is currently Professor Emeritus at the Department of Computer Information Systems, Georgia State University. He is Senior Editor Emeritus of MIS Quarterly and is on the editorial boards of a number of other major journals. His research has been funded by the National Science Foundation (NSF) (through multiple multi-year research grants) as well as by the industry.

== Education ==
After his early education at National High School, Srinagar, Vaishnavi completed his matriculation at Model Academy, Jammu in 1962 and pre-university course at GM Science College, Jammu, in 1963. He completed his B.E. degree in electrical engineering in 1968 from Regional Engineering College, Srinagar (currently National Institute of Technology, Srinagar). He completed his M.Tech. degree in electrical engineering with major in computer science in 1971, (thesis advisor: Hari V. Sahasrabudhe) and Ph.D. degree in 1975 (dissertation advisor: Sanat K. Basu), both from the Indian Institute of Technology Kanpur. He did his postdoctoral work in computer science with Derick Wood at McMaster University, 1977–79.

== Professional career ==
Vaishnavi has mainly been on the faculty of Georgia State University and has also held faculty positions at a number of other universities in India, Canada, and the US such as Birla Institute of Technology and Science, Pilani (where he started his career); Indian Institute of Technology Kanpur; Concordia University; and Ohio University. He has conducted the bulk of his research and scholarly work at the Computer Information Systems (CIS) department of Georgia State University; he joined the department as an associate professor in 1981 and became a full professor in 1987, board of advisors professor in 2005, and professor emeritus in 2014. Over these years the GSU CIS department has gained considerable reputation; its research and academic programs are very highly ranked.

== Honors and awards ==
Vaishnavi was elected as an IEEE Fellow, 2002, with the citation: "For contributions to the theory and practice of software development." He was awarded Lifetime Achievement Award at the International Conference on Design Science Research and Technology (DESRIST) in 2007 for "making significant fundamental contributions in design science research through research, leadership and mentorship." Vaishnavi has received Fulbright Fellowship twice, in 2004 (for 6 months) and in 2010 (for 6 months), for lecturing in India. As a Fulbright Fellow he was a visiting professor at Indian Institute of Technology (IIT), Delhi (2004) and a visiting professor at Indraprastha Institute of Information Technology (IIIT), Delhi (2010).

== Research and scholarly work contributions ==
=== Design science ===
Vaishnavi has made major contributions to design science, particularly the teaching, propagation, and development of design science research methods for information systems and other information and communication technology fields such as computer science, software engineering, and human-computer interface (HCI). Starting in early 1990s, he started focusing his doctoral level seminar course (at Georgia State University) to design science research methods, which he then called "improvement research" taking the novel approach of developing a pattern language for conducting this type of research. This work resulted in the introduction of a formal course for the teaching of this type of research in 2002 called "Design Science Research Methods in Information Systems," creation of the living AIS design science research page in 2004, last revised in 2025, and publication of the book: Design Science Research Methods and Patterns in 2007, which has been widely used as a reference or textbook; the second revised and expanded edition of this book has been published in 2015. In addition to contributing to design science research methods, he has also contributed to advancing design science theory through his books as well as research papers including the EJIS paper and the JAIS paper. His recent work in design science is on social innovation design with the publication of a book on Social Innovation Design Cases.

=== Software engineering ===
In this area Vaishnavi has contributed to facilitating the use of object technology by major companies in addition to making interesting research contributions in a number of subareas of software engineering. Between 1992 and 1998, he worked as a founding research director (along with the executive director, Timothy Korson, at COMSOFT, the Consortium for the Management of Emerging Software Technologies; COMSOFT (sponsored by companies such as IBM, AT&T, Bell South, and Nortel) facilitated object technology transfer to companies. This work resulted in a book on Object Technology Centers of Excellence, published by Manning in 1996). His research contributions to software engineering include models and frameworks for the use of formal specifications, a data/knowledge paradigm for the development of operations support systems, and a comprehensive survey and framework for object-oriented product metrics.

=== Data structures and algorithms ===
The work of Vaishnavi in this area has mainly focused on computational geometry problems and the creation of efficient new data structures for multidimensional and weighted data. In the computational geometry area, Vaishnavi was among early researchers who developed and used techniques for efficiently locating a key in many ordered lists—a problem that frequently arises in computational geometry. In this regard, Mehlhorn and Näher write (on p. 215 of their 1990 article) that several researchers including Vaishnavi and Wood "observed that the naïve strategy of locating the key separately in each list by binary search is far from optimal and that more efficient techniques frequently exist." They further write that Chazelle and Guibas "distilled from these special case solutions a general data structuring technique and called it fractional cascading."

Vaishnavi's work on efficient multidimensional and weighted data structures include creation and analysis of new data structures such as multidimensional height-balanced trees, multidimensional balanced binary trees, and weighted leaf AVL-trees. These data structures generalize known structures for one dimensional data to higher dimensions or weighted data while offering optimal performance.

== Bibliography ==
List of selected publications:

1. Vaishnavi. V.K. and Kuechler, W. Design Science Research Methods and Patterns, 2nd Edition, CRC Press, 2015, 415 pages.
2. Kuechler, W. and V. Vaishnavi. "A Framework for Theory Development in Design Science Research: Multiple Perspectives." Journal of the Association for Information Systems (JAIS), Vol. 13, Issue 6, June 2012, pp. 395–423.
3. Kuechler, B. and V. Vaishnavi. "On Theory Development in Design Science Research: Anatomy of a Research Project." European Journal on Information Systems (EJIS), Vol. 17, No. 5, October 2008, pp. 489–504.
4. Vaishnavi, V. K., S. Purao, and J. Liegle. "Object-Oriented Product Metrics: A Generic Framework." Information Sciences: An International Journal, 2007, Vol. 177, pp. 587–606.
5. Purao, S. and V. K. Vaishnavi. "Product Metrics for Object-Oriented Systems." ACM Computing Surveys, Vol. 35, Issue 2, 2003, pp. 191–221.
6. Vaishnavi, V. K., G. C. Buchanan, and W. L. Kuechler. "A Data/Knowledge Paradigm for the Modeling and Design of Operations Support Systems." IEEE Transactions on Knowledge and Data Engineering, Vol. 9, No. 2, 1997, pp. 275–291.
7. Korson, T.D. and Vaishnavi, V.K. Object Technology Centers of Excellence, Manning, Manning, April 1996, 208 pages.
8. Vaishnavi, V. K. "On k-Dimensional Balanced Binary Trees." Journal of Computer and System Sciences (Academic Press), Vol. 52, No. 2, 1996, pp. 328–348.
9. Fraser, M. D., K. Kumar, and V. K. Vaishnavi. "Strategies for Incorporating Formal Specifications in Software Development." Communications of the ACM, Vol. 37, No. 10, 1994, pp. 74–86.
10. Fraser, M. D., Kumar, K. and Vaishnavi, V.K. "Informal and Formal Requirements Specification Languages: Bridging the Gap." IEEE Transactions on Software Engineering, Vol. 17, 1991, pp. 454–466.
11. Vaishnavi, V. K. "Multidimensional Balanced Binary Trees." IEEE Transactions on Computers, Vol. 38, 1989, pp. 968–985.
12. Vaishnavi, V. K. "Weighted Leaf AVL-Trees." SIAM Journal on Computing, Vol. 16, 1987, 503–537.
13. Vaishnavi, V. K. "On the Height of Multidimensional Height-Balanced Trees." IEEE Transactions on Computers, Vol. 35, 1986, pp. 773–780.
14. Vaishnavi, V. K. "Multidimensional Height-Balanced Trees." IEEE Transactions on Computers, Vol. 33, 1984, pp. 334–343.
15. Vaishnavi, V.K. "Computing Point Enclosures." IEEE Transactions on Computers, Vol. C-31, 1982, pp. 22–29.
16. Vaishnavi, V.K. and Wood, D. "Rectilinear Line Segment Intersection, Layered Segment Trees and Dynamization." J. Algorithms, 3, 1982, pp. 160–176.
