= Late Gupta =

Late Gupta may refer to:

- The later part of the Indian Gupta Empire ("Imperial Guptas"), perhaps from c. 450 to c. 550
- The subsequent, and much less important, Later Guptas, a dynasty in Eastern India, ruling from c. 490 to c. 750

== See also ==
- Gupta (disambiguation)
