= Modern Rheumatology =

- Discipline: Rheumatology
- Language: English
- Former name: Japanese Journal of Rheumatology

Standard abbreviations
- ISO 4: Mod. Rheumatol.

Indexing
- Modern Rheumatology
- ISSN: 1439-7595 (print); 1439-7609 (web)
- Japanese Journal of Rheumatology
- ISSN: 0169-1163 (print); 2213-1019 (web)

Modern Rheumatology is the official English-language journal of Japan College of Rheumatology, published by Taylor and Francis. It was formerly published as Japanese Journal of Rheumatology (1986-1989).

It is indexed by services including Medline, Chemical Abstracts Service and Science Citation Index.
