= Narender =

Narender is a given name. Notable people with the name include:

- Narender Singh Ahlawat, SC, SM, recipient of the Sena Medal, Shaurya Chakra, which was awarded posthumously
- Narender Bedi (1937–1982), Bollywood director and son of the writer Rajinder Singh Bedi
- Narender Gahlot (born 2001), Indian footballer
- Narender Grewal (born 1994), Indian wushu competitor
- Narender Kumar Grewal (born 1998), Indian national men's basketball player
- Narender Gupta, Indian politician
- Narender Nath, member of the Indian National Congress party, member of the Indian Legislative Assembly
- Narender Negi (born 1978), Indian former cricketer
- Narender Ranbir (born 1989), Indian Paralympic javelin thrower competing in F44 events
- Narender K. Sehgal (born 1940), Indian physicist, scientific administrator, and science populariser
- Narender Pal Singh (born 1973), Indian former first-class cricketer
- Narender Singh (Delhi cricketer) (born 1987), Indian former cricketer
- Narender Singh (judoka) (1969–2016), Indian judoka who competed at two Olympic Games
- Narender Thapa, Indian football midfielder

== See also ==
- Narendra (disambiguation)
- Narrandera
