= Gupta (disambiguation) =

Gupta is a common Indian surname.

Gupta may also refer to:

- Gupta Empire, an ancient Indian empire
  - Gupta (king), the founder of the empire's ruling Gupta dynasty
  - Gupta era, a calendar era used by the Gupta rulers
  - Gupta script, the script used for writing Sanskrit during the Gupta Empire in India
- Gupta–Bleuler formalism, a way of quantizing the electromagnetic field.
- Gupta Technologies, a software development company
- Gupta, a main character in the TV series Outsourced portrayed by Parvesh Cheena
- Gupta family, an Indian-South African business family

== See also ==
- Late Gupta (disambiguation)
- Gupt: The Hidden Truth, 1997 Indian film
