= Biomarkers in Medicine =

- Discipline: Biochemistry
- Language: English
- Edited by: Andre Terzic, Scott Waldman

Publication details
- History: 2007–present
- Publisher: Future Medicine
- Frequency: Monthly
- Impact factor: 2.020 (2016)

Standard abbreviations
- ISO 4: Biomark. Med.

Indexing
- CODEN: BMIEDG
- ISSN: 1752-0363 (print); 1752-0371 (web)
- OCLC no.: 314420591

Links
- Journal homepage

Biomarkers in Medicine is a monthly peer-reviewed medical journal established in 2007 and published by Future Medicine. The editors-in-chief are Andre Terzic (Mayo Clinic and Scott Waldman (Thomas Jefferson University). The journal covers all aspects of research on biomarkers.

== Abstracting and indexing ==
The journal is abstracted and indexed in BIOSIS Previews, Biotechnology Citation Index, Chemical Abstracts, EMBASE/Excerpta Medica, Index Medicus/MEDLINE/PubMed, Science Citation Index Expanded, and Scopus. According to the Journal Citation Reports, the journal has a 2016 impact factor of 2.020, ranking it 77th out of 128 journals in the category "Medicine, Research & Experimental".
