= Michelle Glass =

New Zealand pharmacology academic

- Education: University of Auckland
- Scientific career
- Fields: Pharmacology of cannabinoid receptors
- Workplaces: University of Auckland, University of Otago
- Thesis: Receptor alterations in human neuro-degenerative diseases (1994)

Michelle Glass FRSNZ is a New Zealand pharmacology academic. She is currently a full professor. She was Head of the Department of Pharmacology & Toxicology at the University of Otago from 2018-2024.

== Career ==
Since a 1994 PhD titled 'Receptor alterations in human neuro-degenerative diseases' at the University of Auckland, she has worked at both the University of Auckland and the University of Otago, rising to full professor.

Glass's primary work has been on cannabinoids and they have received multiple grants for the work and considerable press attention. She has also been involved in a documentary 'Mum, Cannabis and Me'

More recently, Prof Glass has applied her expertise in G protein-coupled receptors to the forest pathogen, kauri dieback. In 2018, she received a grant from the Marsden Fund entitled "Applying human drug discovery approaches to kauri dieback"

In 2024 Glass was elected as a Fellow of the Royal Society Te Apārangi.

== Selected works ==
- Glass, M., R. L. M. Faull, and M. Dragunow. "Cannabinoid receptors in the human brain: a detailed anatomical and quantitative autoradiographic study in the fetal, neonatal and adult human brain." Neuroscience 77, no. 2 (1997): 299–318.
- Glass, Michelle, and Christian C. Felder. "Concurrent stimulation of cannabinoid CB1 and dopamine D2 receptors augments cAMP accumulation in striatal neurons: evidence for a Gs linkage to the CB1 receptor." Journal of Neuroscience 17, no. 14 (1997): 5327–5333.
- Buckley, Nancy E., Kathleen L. McCoy, Éva Mezey, Tom Bonner, Anne Zimmer, Christian C. Felder, Michelle Glass, and Andreas Zimmer. "Immunomodulation by cannabinoids is absent in mice deficient for the cannabinoid CB2 receptor." European Journal of Pharmacology 396, no. 2-3 (2000): 141–149.
- Glass, M., M. Dragunow, and R. L. M. Faull. "The pattern of neurodegeneration in Huntington's disease: a comparative study of cannabinoid, dopamine, adenosine and GABAA receptor alterations in the human basal ganglia in Huntington's disease." Neuroscience 97, no. 3 (2000): 505–519.
- Felder, Christian C., and Michelle Glass. "Cannabinoid receptors and their endogenous agonists." Annual Review of Pharmacology and toxicology 38, no. 1 (1998): 179–200.
- Kearn, Christopher S., Katherine Blake-Palmer, Emma Daniel, Ken Mackie, and Michelle Glass. "Concurrent stimulation of cannabinoid CB1 and dopamine D2 receptors enhances heterodimer formation: a mechanism for receptor crosstalk?." Molecular Pharmacology (2005).
- Robson, Hunter, Rhiannon Braund, Michelle Glass, Janelle Ashton, Michael Tatley. "Synthetic cannabis: adverse events reported to the New Zealand Pharmacovigilance Centre." Clinical Toxicology (2020).
