= Narendra, Karnataka =

Narendra
- Village
- Location in Karnataka, India Narendra (India)
- Coordinates: 15°31′N 74°59′E
- Country: India
- State: Karnataka
- District: Dharwad
- Talukas: Dharwad

Government
  - Type: Panchayat raj
  - Body: Gram panchayat

Population (2011)
  - Total: 5,276

Languages
  - Official: Kannada
- Time zone: UTC+5:30 (IST)
- PIN: 580005
- ISO 3166 code: IN-KA
- Vehicle registration: KA
- Website: karnataka.gov.in

Narendra is a village in the southern state of Karnataka, India. It is located in the Dharwad taluk of Dharwad district in Karnataka.

Temples: Temple dedicated to Nandi (Ox) worshipped by the villagers, located on a small hillock to the North West of Narendra Village. This temple is crowded in August, (especially in Shravana Masa). Devotees visit this temple frequently.

Shankara Linga Temple: An ancient Shiva Temple on the banks of Hire Kere, (Lake) Narendra.

Lake: There is a one lake (Hire Kere) which provides water for local farmers and citizens.

Soil and main crops: Mainly red soil, good for agriculture and growing vegetables and flowers, most of the population depend on agriculture and this village is mainly known as a farmer's village.

Main crops in this village are groundnuts, jowar, paddy, cotton and other vegetables and flowers.

Nearby villages include Mummigatti (3.4 km, 2.1 mi), Dharwad (7 km, 4.3 mi), Honnapur (7.3 km, 4.5 mi), Belur (7.4 km, 4.6 mi), Marewad (8 km, 5.0 mi). Nearby towns are Dharwad (3.8 km, 2.4 mi), Hubli (23.6 km, 14.7 mi), Kalghatgi (36.5 km, 22.7 mi), Kundgol (40 km, 25 mi).

- Taluk name: Dharwad
- District: Dharwad
- State: Karnataka
- Pin code: 580005
- Post office name: Dharwad U A S

== Demographics ==
As of the 2011 Census of India there were 971 households in Narendra and a total population of 5,276 consisting of 2,688 males and 2,588 females. There were 686 children ages 0–6.

== See also ==
- Dharwad
- Districts of Karnataka
