= Narendra Singh (disambiguation) =

Narendra Singh Tomar is an Indian politician, ex union minister and speaker of Madhya Pradesh Assembly.

Narendra Singh may also refer to:

- Narendra Singh (politician), Indian politician
- Narendra Singh Khalsa, Indian-Afghan politician
- Narendra Singh Negi, Indian singer
- Narendra Singh Bisht, Indian politician and advocate
- Narendra Singh Yadav, Indian politician
- Narendra Singh Hanse, victim of Air India Flight 182 bombing in 1985

== See also ==
- Narender Singh (disambiguation)
