= Journal of Clinical Immunology =

- Discipline: Immunology
- Language: English
- Edited by: Vincent Bonagura

Publication details
- History: 1981–present
- Publisher: Springer Science+Business Media
- Frequency: Bimonthly
- Open access: Hybrid
- Impact factor: 8.317 (2020)

Standard abbreviations
- ISO 4: J. Clin. Immunol.

Indexing
- ISSN: 0271-9142 (print); 1573-2592 (web)
- OCLC no.: 6742940

Links
- Journal homepage

The Journal of Clinical Immunology is a bimonthly medical journal published by Springer Science+Business Media since 1981. It focuses on research investigating immunology—via basic research, translational research, or clinical studies—and diseases related to the immune system. The editor-in-chief is Vincent Bonagura (Northwell Health). According to the 2020 Journal Citation Reports, its impact factor is 8.317.
