= International League of Associations of Rheumatology =

International League of Associations of Rheumatology (ILAR) is an international body of the associations of Rheumatologists from around the world. It comprises partner organisations PANLAR, Pan American League of Associations for Rheumatology, EULAR, European League against Rheumatism, APLAR, Asia Pacific League of Associations of Rheumatology and AFLAR, African League of Associations for Rheumatology. ILAR has taken leadership in the development of global consensus on the diagnosis of rheumatological diseases especially juvenile idiopathic arthritis It published the ILAR Journal.
