= Sarah Hook =

New Zealand immunology academic

- Born: 1967 (age 58–59)
- Education: University of Otago
- Scientific career
- Fields: Immunology
- Workplaces: University of Otago
- Thesis: Cervine Interleukin-4 (1995)

Sarah Margaret Hook (born 1967) is a New Zealand immunology academic, and as of 2019 is a full professor at the University of Otago.

== Academic career ==
After a 1995 PhD titled 'Cervine Interleukin-4' at the University of Otago, Hook joined the staff, rising to full professor.

== Selected works ==
- Armstrong, David S., Sarah M. Hook, Kris M. Jamsen, Gillian M. Nixon, Rosemary Carzino, John B. Carlin, Colin F. Robertson, and Keith Grimwood. "Lower airway inflammation in infants with cystic fibrosis detected by newborn screening." Pediatric pulmonology 40, no. 6 (2005): 500–510.
- Rizwan, Shakila B., Ben J. Boyd, Thomas Rades, and Sarah Hook. "Bicontinuous cubic liquid crystals as sustained delivery systems for peptides and proteins." Expert opinion on drug delivery 7, no. 10 (2010): 1133–1144.
- Marsland, Benjamin J., Nicola L. Harris, Mali Camberis, Manfred Kopf, Sarah M. Hook, and Graham Le Gros. "Bystander suppression of allergic airway inflammation by lung resident memory CD8+ T cells." Proceedings of the National Academy of Sciences 101, no. 16 (2004): 6116–6121.
- Graf, Anja, Elisabeth Ablinger, Silvia Peters, Andreas Zimmer, Sarah Hook, and Thomas Rades. "Microemulsions containing lecithin and sugar-based surfactants: nanoparticle templates for delivery of proteins and peptides." International journal of pharmaceutics 350, no. 1-2 (2008): 351–360.
