= Christopher Shaw (neurologist) =

British academic

Chris E Shaw
- Born: Christopher Edward Dennistoun Shaw; 27 March 1960
- Education: University of Cambridge
- Spouse: Pinar Bagci
- Children: one son; one daughter
- Awards: Sheila Essey Award
- Scientific career
- Fields: Neurology; Neuroscience
- Workplaces: King's College Hospital; Institute of Psychiatry, Psychology and Neuroscience; King's College London
- Doctoral advisor: Alastair Compston
- Website: kclpure.kcl.ac.uk/portal/chris.shaw.html

Christopher Edward Dennistoun Shaw (born 1960) is Professor of Neurology and Neurogenetics at the Institute of Psychiatry, Psychology and Neuroscience, King's College London. He is also Director of the Maurice Wohl Clinical Neuroscience Institute at King's College London and an Honorary Consultant Neurologist and Neurogeneticist at King's College Hospital. His major research interest is in the genetic, molecular and cellular basis of motor neuron diseases such as amyotrophic lateral sclerosis (ALS).

== Education ==
Shaw conducted his clinical training in general medicine and neurology in New Zealand. In 1992, he began his doctoral studies on Wellcome Trust Fellowship with Professor Alastair Compston at the University of Cambridge.

== Career ==
Shaw moved to the Institute of Psychiatry (now Institute of Psychiatry, Psychology and Neuroscience) and started collaborating with Professor Nigel Leigh in 1995. Research led by Shaw has identified mutations in two genes causing ALS, namely TARDBP and FUS.

He was elected a Fellow of the Academy of Medical Sciences in 2010.
