= Pharmaceutical Society of New Zealand =

Professional body for New Zealand pharmacists

Pharmaceutical Society of New Zealand Incorporated
- Abbreviation: PSNZ
- Website: www.psnz.org.nz

The Pharmaceutical Society of New Zealand Incorporated is the professional body for New Zealand pharmacists.

The headquarters of the Pharmaceutical Society is Level 12, Grand Arcade, 18 Willis Street, Wellington, New Zealand.

Until the formation of the NZ Society in 1884, pharmacists in New Zealand were usually members of the British Pharmaceutical Society. As a result, the practice of pharmacy (or 'chemist and druggist' as it was usually known at the time) in New Zealand was similar to British practice, and this has continued to be the case.

From 1884 until 2004, membership of the Society was a legally specified requirement for practice as a pharmacist in New Zealand, signified by the post-nominal letters, 'MPS' (Member of Pharmaceutical Society). Membership was restricted to those who had passed the examinations, originally conducted by the Society and later by government operated Schools of Pharmacy, and then completed a period of practical training.

In 2004 pharmacy registration was transferred to a separate body with government-appointed members, the Pharmacy Council of New Zealand, and the Society (as it is often known) continued as a voluntary membership organisation representing pharmacists and seeking to advance pharmacy practice.
