= Narinder Kumar Gupta =

Indian academic

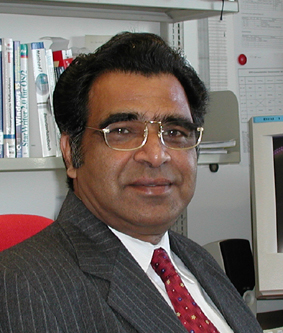
- Born: 22 August 1942 (age 84); Mirpur, Jammu and Kashmir, India
- Education: Indian Institute of Technology Delhi, National Institute of Technology, Srinagar
- Known for: Applied mechanics, Plasticity, Impact (mechanics)
- Awards: J.C.Bose Memorial Award, O.P. Bhasin Award, Alexander von Humboldt Research Award, Doctor Honoris Causa by the Russian Academy of Sciences, Mercator Professorship, supported by DFG. Padma Shri
- Scientific career
- Fields: Solid mechanics, plasticity, Impact (mechanics)
- Workplaces: Indian Institute of Technology Delhi, University of Cambridge, Ruhr University Bochum, RWTH Aachen University
- Doctoral advisor: Professor B. Karunes

Narinder Kumar Gupta is a research scientist, educator, and engineer. Born 22 August 1942 in Mirpur, Jammu and Kashmir, India, he is a professor of Mechanics at the Indian Institute of Technology in Delhi. Gupta works in the area of large deformations of metals and composites at low, medium and high rates of loading. His research stimulates the development of constitutive behaviour of materials, understanding of the basic mechanics of large deformation, design for crashworthiness of road and air vehicles, design for safety in defence applications and in design of metal forming processes.

== Education ==
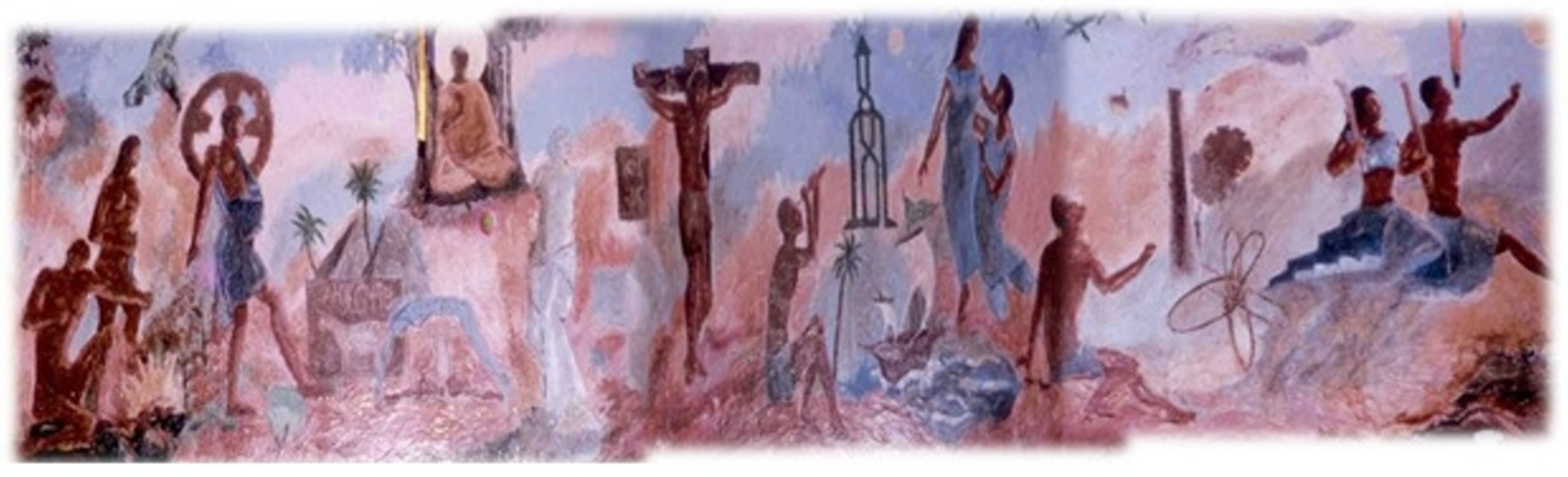
Painting on History of civilization made by Prof. N. K. Gupta

He received his Bachelor of Science from the Jammu and Kashmir University in 1960, his Bachelor of Mechanical Engineering from the Regional Engineering College, Srinagar (Now NIT Srinagar) in 1966 and his PhD from the IIT Delhi under Prof. B. Karunes in 1972.

He did his post-doctoral studies in Cambridge University under Professor W. Johnson (1977) and as Alexander von Humboldt fellow at Ruhr University Bochum under Professor Th. J. Lehmann (1981).

== Profession ==
Gupta has been a faculty member in the department of applied mechanics at the Indian Institute of Technology, Delhi since 1971 and has been a full professor since 1987 and retired in 2005. He continued as Henry Ford Chair Emeritus Professor from 2005 to 2010, and then as emeritus professor till 2011. He was invited as Mercator Guest Professor at RWTH Aachen, supported by the German Research Foundation for one year (2011–2012).

Gupta continued to work as "INSA (Indian National Science Academy) Senior Scientist" at the Indian Institute of Technology, Delhi, from 2012 to 2017. He was also associated for a period (2013–14) with the Supercomputer Education and Research Center, Indian Institute of Science, Bangalore. Presently, he continues with his academic work as an "INSA Honorary Scientist" since 2017 at the Indian Institute of Technology, Delhi.

== Activity fields ==
Gupta works in the area of large deformations of metals and composites at low, medium and high rates of loading. His research finds application in development of constitutive behaviour of materials, understanding of the basic mechanics of large deformation, design for crashworthiness of road and air vehicles, design for safety in defence applications and in design of metal forming processes.

He has been instrumental in setting up the India's first and internationally recognised low and medium velocity impact testing laboratory in the Department of Applied Mechanics at the IIT Delhi and has fostered and nurtured this area in India.

He has published over 350 scientific papers (with over 5000 citations) in peer-reviewed national and international journals and conference proceedings, edited eight books, mentored nearly 40 PhD and 75 MTech students, and undertaken national and international research and consultancy projects. He has been a visiting professor and fellow and invited to deliver guest lectures in universities in Armenia, Australia, Brazil, China, France, Germany, Italy, Japan, New Zealand, Malaysia, Norway, Poland, Russia, Singapore, South Africa, Thailand, Trinidad, United Arab Emirates, the United Kingdom and United States.

He was invited to deliver a keynote lecture at the 2008 World Congress of the International Union of Theoretical and Applied Mechanics (ICTAM), held in Adelaide, Australia. The German National Academy of Sciences, Leopoldina, invited him to deliver a lecture at an annual event in 2012 along with the German scientist Prof. M. Kleiner, who was then the President of DFG. Gupta delivered the "K S Krishnan memorial lecture" during the annual meeting of the INSA at Lucknow in 2013. In 2014, he delivered a plenary lecture to the 39th Solid Mechanics Conference held in Poland. He has been invited to deliver national lectures, which include Taylor memorial, Seth memorial, Bhatnagar memorial, Karunes memorial and Joga Rao memorial, and also numerous inaugural, keynote and invited lectures in major conferences and reputed institutions in India.

He has been on the Editorial advisory boards of the International Journal of Mechanical Sciences (1981–1985), the International Journal of Impact Engineering, the International Journal of Crashworthiness (1996–2007), the Latin American Journal of Solids and Structures, Thin Walled Structures, Fatigue & Fracture of Engineering Materials & Structures (2006–2011), the Journal of Aeronautics Society of India, Proceedings of the Indian National Science Academy, Sadhana, Defence Science Journal and Everyman's Science. He is president of the Indian Society of Industrial and Applied Mathematics, past president of the Indian Society of Theoretical and Applied Mechanics and past president of the Indian Society of Mechanical Engineers. He was vice-president of the Indian National Science Academy and chairman of the National Committee of the academy for IUTAM (International Union of Theoretical and Applied Mechanics) and IMU (International Mathematical Union). He has been member of IUTAM Bureau( 2008–2012) and Congress Committee (2008 - 2018). He is member or chairman of several other national and international academic bodies. He is fellow of the Indian National Science Academy, the Indian National Academy of Engineering, the National Academy of Sciences, India, the Aeronautical Society of India, the Institution of Engineers, India and The World Academy of Sciences (TWAS).

Gupta's expertise in the mechanics of large deformation of metals and composites under impact loading has greatly augmented India's advance in technology, in particular, defence and aerospace researches. He helped found IMPLAST, an international event held regularly in India and countries across the world, including Australia (2000), Germany (2007), and the USA (2010). The last IMPLAST held in India was in 2016, and the recent was held in Republic of Korea in 2019. He also initiated a series of Indo-Russian workshops in "Theoretical and Applied Mechanics", held in both India and Russia. Gupta has edited nearly a dozen volumes of IMPLAST and Indo-Russian workshops, which the scientific community has very well received. These events provide a forum for Indian scientists to interact with several known international scientists. Gupta has been a voice of India in international forums in articulating the country's long-term vision on key scientific and technical issues.

== Honours ==
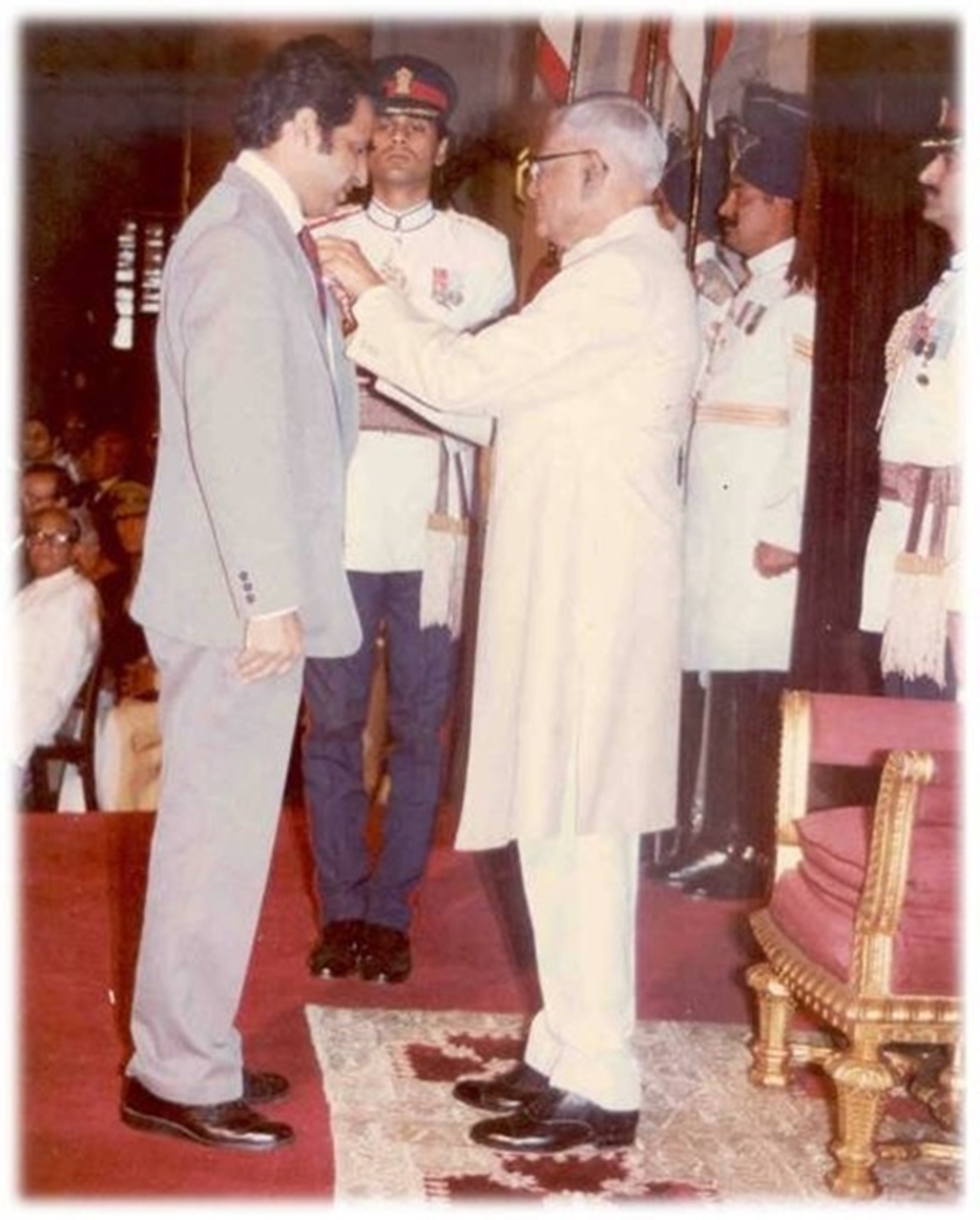
Receiving Padam Shri Award from President of India ( Shri R. Venkataraman)

Gupta was conferred Padma Shri by the President of India in 1991.

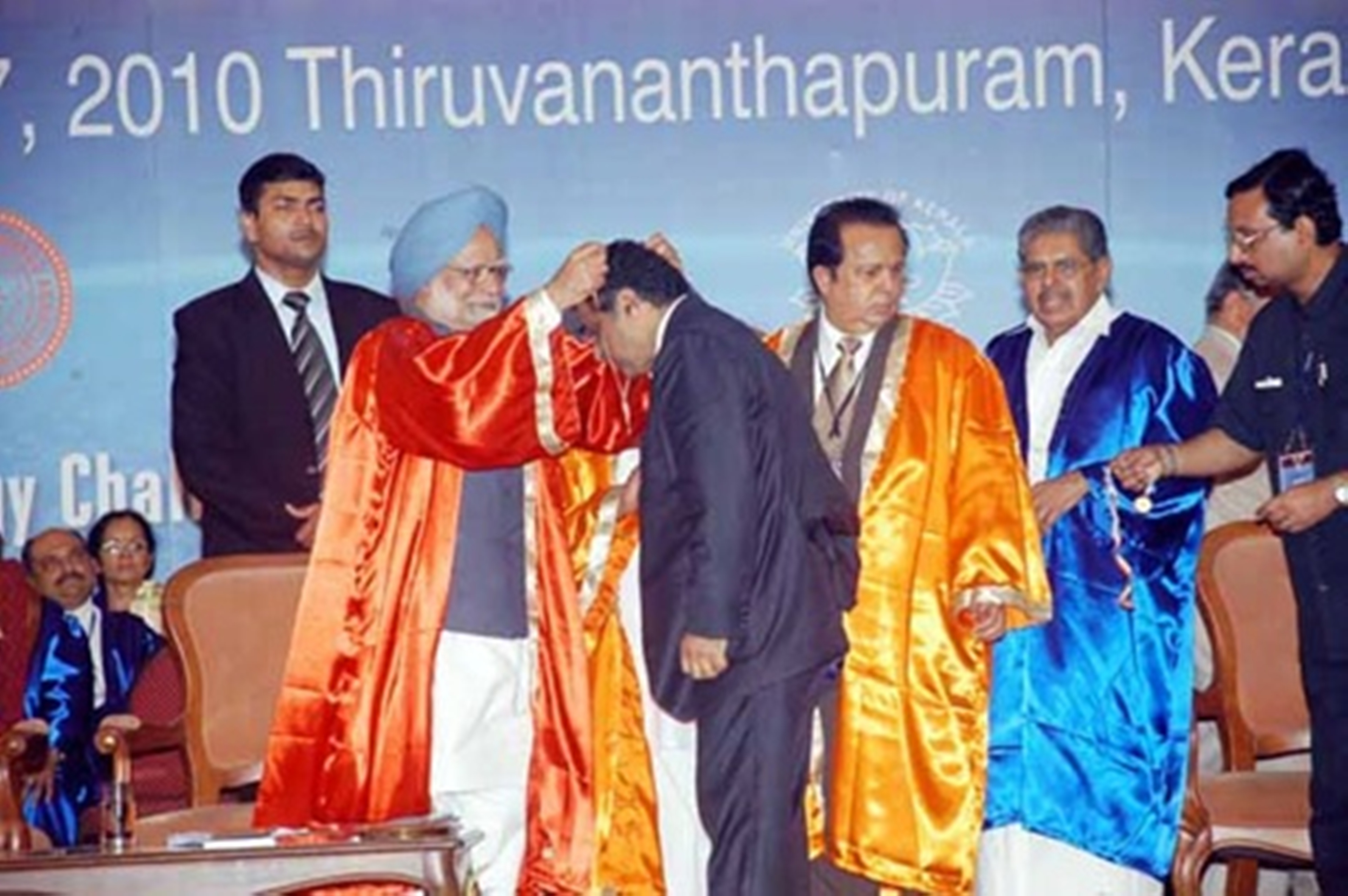
Recipient of J C Bose Award from the Prime Minister of India (Dr. Manmohan Singh)

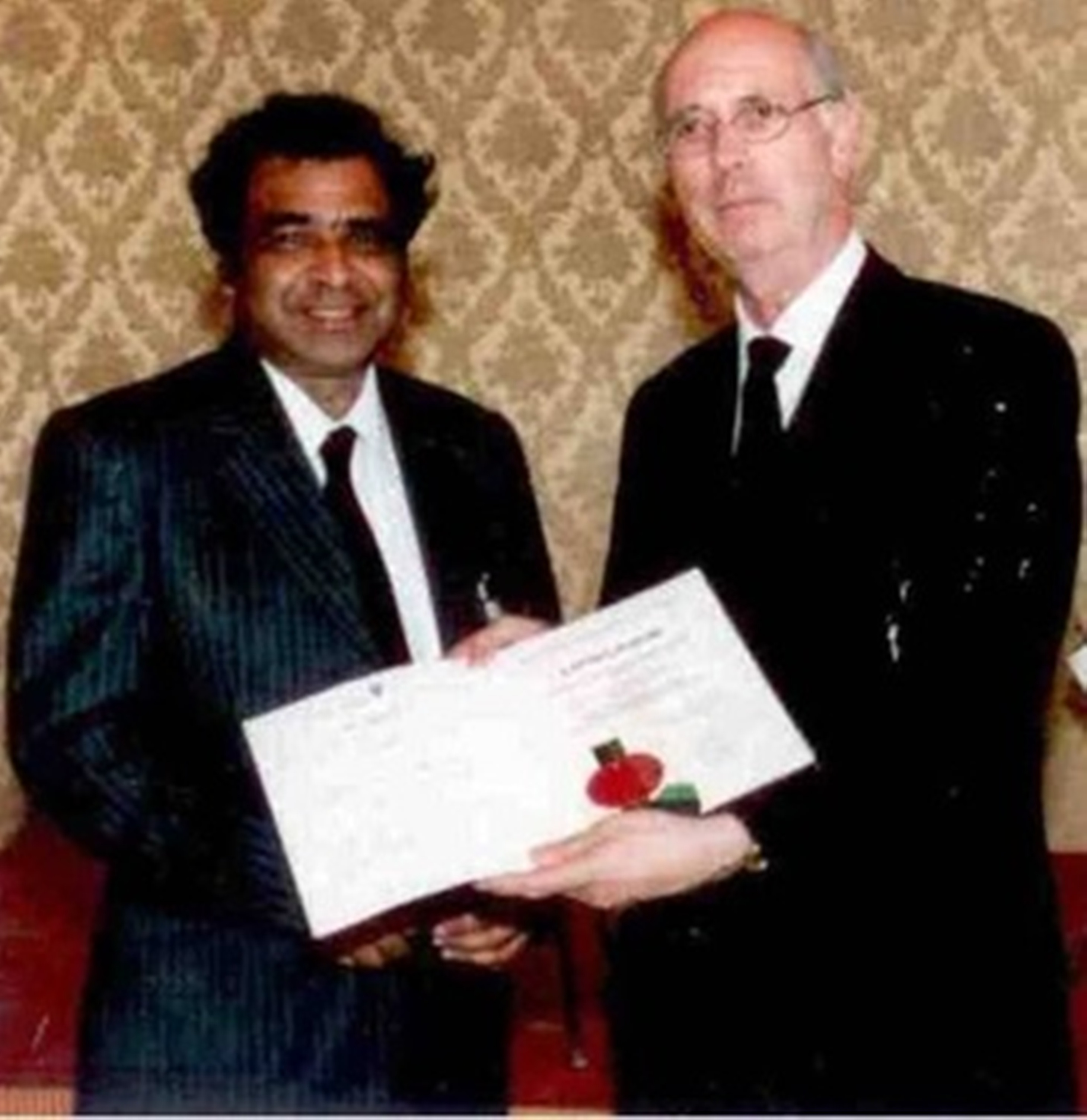
Receiving Humboldt research award from the president of Humboldt Foundation

Professor Gupta is recipient of J.C. Bose Memorial Award, the O. P. Bhasin Award, the Millennium Plaques of Honour (ISCA) Award, the Erskine (New Zealand) Award, the Alexander von Humboldt (Germany) Research Award and several other honours and awards. He has been conferred Doctor Honoris Causa by the Russian Academy of Sciences and Mercator Professorship of DFG and DRDO Academy excellence award.

Gupta is Fellow of the Indian National Science Academy, Indian National Academy of Engineering, National Academy of Sciences, India and the Third World Academy of Sciences.

The esteem that Gupta enjoys nationally and internationally is shown by the fact that conferences to honour his contributions were held on his 60th and 70th birthday in India in 2002 and 2012, On his 65th birthday in Bochum, Germany, in 2007, and was honoured on 70th in Singapore in 2012. Special issues of the International Journal of Impact Engineering, Proceedings of the Indian National Science Academy and Defence Science Journal were devoted to his birthdays. These issues received contributions from highly regarded international scientists. A special issue to honour his contributions has been published by the International Journal of Impact Engineering, in 2017.

Gupta has been named as one of five Honorary Members - honoured as one of the top five world scientists in the area of impact mechanics - by the International Society of Impact Engineering.

In 2019 Prof. Gupta is awarded prestigious "DRDO Academy Excellence Award"

== Selected publications ==
- N. K. Gupta and S. K. Sinha (1990); "Collapse of a laterally compressed square tube resting on a flat base". International Journal of Solids and Structures, 26, 601‑615
- N. K. Gupta and A. Meyers (1992); "Considerations of translated yield surfaces". International Journal of Plasticity, 8, 729‑740
- N. K. Gupta and V. Madhu (1997); "An Experimental Study of normal and oblique impact of a hard core projectile on single and layered plates". International Journal of Impact Engineering, 27, 901 – 918
- N. K. Gupta, (2002) "IMPLAST symposia and large deformations – a perspective", International Journal of Impact Engineering, 27, 901 – 918
- O. T. Bruhns, N. K. Gupta, A. Meyers and H. Xiao (2003), "Bending of an elastoplastic strip with isotropic and kinematic hardening". Archive of Applied Mechanics, Volume 72, pages 759–778, 2003
- N. K. Gupta and Nagesh, (2006) "Collapse mode transitions of thin tubes with wall thickness, end condition and shape eccentricity", International Journal of Mechanical Sciences, 48, 210–223
- N. K. Gupta, M. A. Iqbal and G. S. Sekhon (2007), "Effect of projectile nose shape, impact velocity, and target thickness on the deformation behaviour of thin aluminium targets", International Journal of Solids and Structures, 44, 3411–343
- N. K. Gupta, N. Mohamed Sheriff and R. Velmurugan, (2007) "Experimental and numerical investigations into collapse behavior of thin spherical shells under drop hammer impact", International Journal of Solids and Structures, 44, 3136–3155
- M. Klaus, H. _G. Reimerdes and N. K. Gupta (2012), "Experimental and Numerical investigations of residual strength after impact of sandwich panels", International Journal of Impact Engineering, 44, 50–58

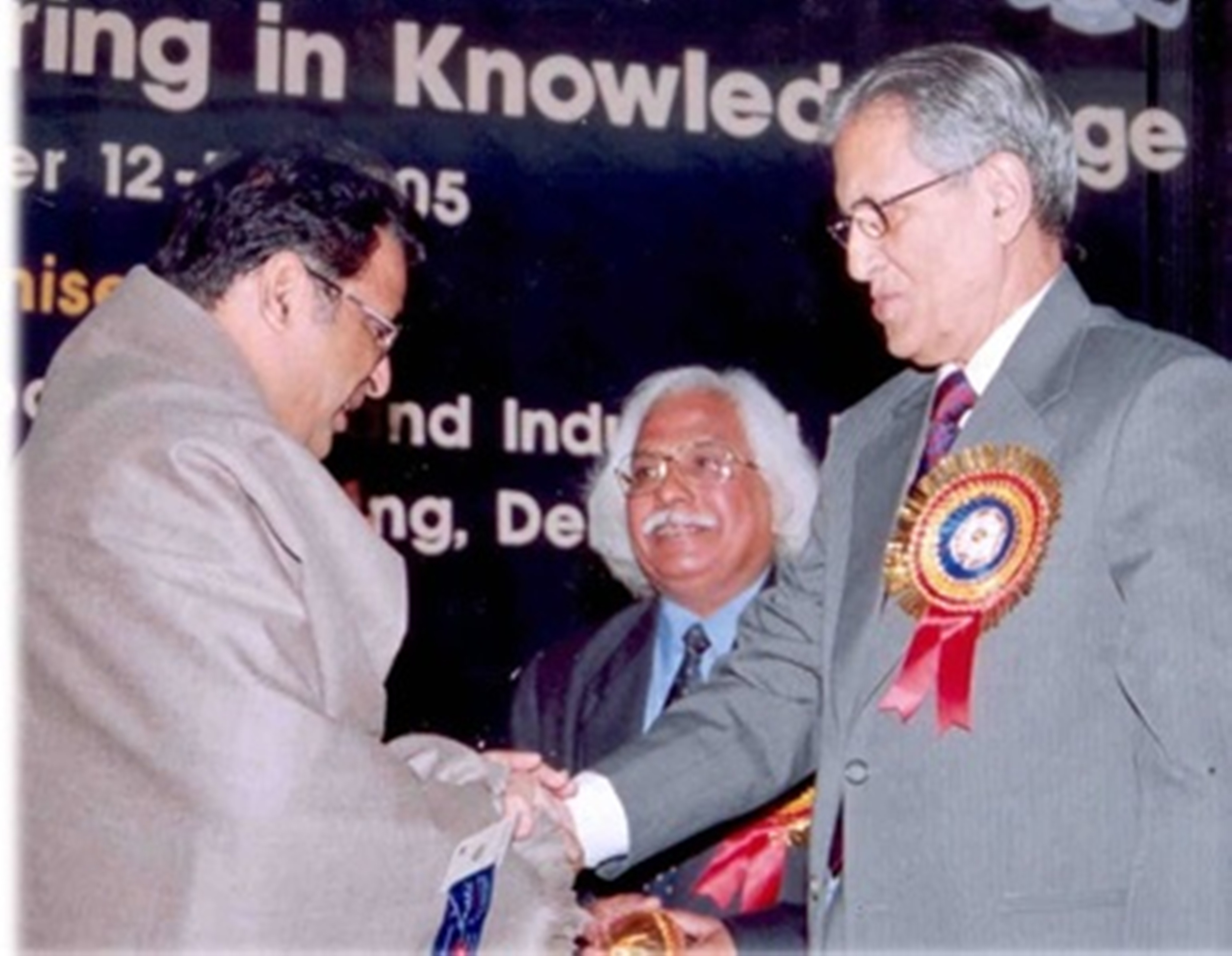
Distinguished mechanical engineering educator award being given by the Lieutenant Governor of Delhi
