= List of stock exchanges in India =

Stock exchanges in India include official operating stock and commodity exchanges by SEBI and numerous defunct ones.

== Operating stock exchanges ==
- Bombay Stock Exchange (BSE) in Mumbai, founded in erstwhile Bombay, is the oldest and one of the two principal large stock exchanges in India. It has a market capitalization of $5.25 trillion.
- National Stock Exchange (NSE) in Mumbai, is one of the two principal large stock exchanges in India. It has a market capitalization of $5.32 trillion.
- India International Exchange (India INX) in GIFT City.
- NSE International Exchange (NSE IX) in GIFT City.
- United Stock Exchange (USE) in Mumbai.
- Metropolitan Stock Exchange (MSE) in Mumbai.
- Multi Commodity Exchange (MCX) in Mumbai.
- National Commodity & Derivatives Exchange (NCDEX) in Mumbai.
- Indian Commodity Exchange (ICEX) in Navi Mumbai.

== Former stock exchanges ==
- Ahmedabad Stock Exchange (closed in 2018)
- Calcutta Stock Exchange (closed in 2013)
- Delhi Stock Exchange (closed in 2017)
- Gauhati Stock Exchange (closed in 2015)
- Jaipur Stock Exchange (closed in 2015)
- Madhya Pradesh Stock Exchange (closed in 2015)
- Madras Stock Exchange (closed in 2015)
- OTC Exchange (closed in 2015)
- Inter-connected Stock Exchange (closed in 2014)
- Pune Stock Exchange (closed in 2015)
- UP Stock Exchange (closed in 2015)
- Vadodara Stock Exchange (closed in 2015)
- Bangalore Stock Exchange (closed in 2014)
- Cochin Stock Exchange (closed in 2014)
- Ludhiana Stock Exchange (closed in 2014)
- Bhubaneshwar Stock Exchange (closed in 2005)
- Coimbatore Stock Exchange (closed in 2009)
- Hyderabad Stock Exchange (closed in 2007)
- Magadh Stock Exchange (closed in 2007)
- Mangalore Stock Exchange (closed in 2004)
- Raipur Stock Exchange (closed in 2018)
