= Pune Stock Exchange =

Former stock exchange in Pune, India

Pune Stock Exchange (PSE) was established in 1982. The Securities and Exchange Board of India (SEBI) allowed the exchange to exit bourse business with an order on 13 April 2015. Earlier, the SEBI had allowed various stock exchanges including OTC Exchange of India, Cochin Stock Exchange, Ludhiana Stock Exchange, Gauhati Stock Exchange, Bhubaneswar Stock Exchange, Hyderabad Stock Exchange, Coimbatore Stock Exchange, Inter-connected Stock Exchange of India and Bangalore Stock Exchange to exit from the bourse business.

== See also ==
- List of South Asian stock exchanges
- List of stock exchanges in the Commonwealth of Nations
