= Guwahati (disambiguation) =

Guwahati is a city in Assam, India.

Guwahati may also refer to:

== Places ==
=== Guwahati ===
- Assam State Zoo cum Botanical Garden or Guwahati Zoo
- Gauhati High Court or Guwahati High Court
- Guwahati Central Assembly constituency, an Assam Legislative Assembly constituency
- Guwahati Central Jail, a prison centre
- Guwahati City Centre Mall, a shopping mall
- Guwahati College of Architecture, an architectural school
- Guwahati Lok Sabha constituency, a Lok Sabha constituency in the parliament of India
- Guwahati railway station, a railway station in Guwahati
- Guwahati Refinery, a refinery in Guwahati
- Gauhati Stock Exchange or Guwahati Stock Exchange, a former stock exchange
- Guwahati Tea Auction Centre, a tea trading facility
- Guwahati War Cemetery, a CWGC cemetery
- Guwahati Neurological Research Centre or GNRC
- Guwahati University, another name for Gauhati University

== Sports ==
- Guwahati FC, an Indian football club in Guwahati
- Guwahati City FC, an Indian football club in Guwahati
- Guwahati ISL Club or NorthEast United FC, an Indian football club in Guwahati
- Guwahati Town Club or Gauhati Town Club, an Indian football club in Guwahati

== Transport ==
- Guwahati Metro, a rapid transit system in Guwahati
- Guwahati Ropeway, an aerial ropeway system in Guwahati
- Guwahati Express or Kaziranga Superfast Express, an Indian passenger train

== Others ==
- Guwahati Asian Film Festival, a film festival in Guwahati
- Guwahati Food Awards, a culinary food award ceremony in Guwahati
- Guwahati Half Marathon, a marathon in Guwahati conducted by IIT Guwahati
- Guwahati International Film Festival, an annual Indian film festival in Guwahati
- Guwahati Masters, an annual badminton tournament in Guwahati
- Guwahati Metropolitan Development Authority, the metro region development authority of Guwahati
- Guwahati Municipal Corporation, the municipal corporation of Guwahati
- Guwahati Planetarium, a planetarium in Guwahati
- Guwahati Police Commissionerate, a department of Assam Police
- Guwahati Theatre Festival, a theatre festival in Guwahati

== See also ==
- Gauhati (disambiguation)
