= Gauhati (disambiguation) =

Gauhati is the former name of Guwahati, a city in Assam, India.

Guwahati may also refer to:

- Gauhati Airport, another name for Lokpriya Gopinath Bordoloi International airport, an airport in Guwahati
- Gauhati Cine club, a film society
- Gauhati High Court, a high court of India, serving Assam and northeastern India
- Gauhati Medical College and Hospital, a medical college in Guwahati
- Gauhati Stock Exchange, former Indian stock exchange
- Gauhati Town Club, an Indian association football club
  - Judges Field, or the Gauhati Town Club Ground, multi-purpose sports ground in Guwahati
- Gauhati University, a university in Guwahati
- Guwahati Oil refinery, or the Gauhati Oil refinery, Oil refinery in Guwahati
- Gauhati East Assembly Constituency, a constituency of the Assam Legislative Assembly
- Gauhati Wast Assembly Constituency, a constituency of the Assam Legislative Assembly
- Guwahati Lok Sabha Constituency, a.k.a Gauhati Lok Sabha Constituency, an Indian parliamentary constituency

== See also ==
- Guwahati (disambiguation)
