= S. P. Oswal =

Industrialist

- Born: 1942 (age 83–84); Punjab, India
- Education: Panjab University
- Occupation: Industrialist
- Organization: Vardhman Textiles
- Known for: Founder of Vardhman Group of Companies
- Title: Chairman and managing director, Vardhman Textiles
- Father: Rattan Chand Oswal
- Awards: Padma Bhushan (2010)

S. P. Oswal (born 1942) is an Indian industrialist and the chairman and managing director of Vardhman Textiles. He was awarded the Padma Bhushan in 2010 for his contribution to trade and industry.

== Early life and education ==
S. P. Oswal was born in 1942 in Punjab. His father, Rattan Chand Oswal, was a businessman who was part of the family business.

Oswal studied at Panjab University, Chandigarh, where he completed a Master of Commerce degree and received a gold medal. He later joined the family business after completing his master's degree.

== Career ==
Oswal is reported to have contributed to strengthen the spinning industry in North India. He is also regarded as the force behind the establishment of Ludhiana Stock Exchange in 1983.

Oswal is married to Shakun and the couple has a daughter, Suchita, whose husband, Sachit Jain, is an Executive Director of the Vardhman Group.

Positions held

Oswal held several positions in industry and public institutions. He served as chairman of the National Committee on Textiles of the Confederation of Indian Industry, a director of Exim Bank of India, and a director of UTI Trustee Company Pvt. Ltd. He was also a member of the Industrial Advisory Council of the Government of Madhya Pradesh, the Board of Governors of Punjab Technical University, and the Board of Governors of IIT Delhi. He served as chairman of the Sant Longowal Institute of Engineering and Technology and was the founder president and director of the Ludhiana Stock Exchange from 1983 to 1987.

== Awards and recognition ==
- Padma Bhushan – 2010, for services to trade and industry.
- Udyog Ratna – 2005, awarded by the PHD Chamber of Commerce and Industry.
- Lakshya Business Visionary Award – 2019, awarded by the National Institute of Industrial Engineering.
- LMA Sat Paul Mittal Lifetime Achievement Award – 2011.
- Vastra Ratna Award (Textile Excellence) – 2024, presented by the Cotton Textiles Export Promotion Council.

== Cyber fraud case ==
In August 2024, Oswal was defrauded of ₹7 crore in a Cyber fraud in which the perpetrators impersonated officials of the Central Bureau of Investigation and other government authorities. The fraudsters used fake documents and a simulated Supreme Court hearing conducted over Skype to convince him that he was under investigation, after which he transferred the money to accounts provided by them.

Ludhiana Police registered a case and arrested two suspects. About ₹5.25 crore was recovered from the accounts used in the fraud. The Enforcement Directorate later took up the case under the Prevention of Money Laundering Act. In February 2026, it attached ₹1.76 crore and filed a prosecution complaint against five people.
