= Magadh Stock Exchange =

Stock exchange in Patna, India

Magadh Stock Exchange Association
- Type: Stock Exchange
- Location: Patna, India
- Founded: 1986
- Closed: 3 September 2007
- Owner: Government of India (100%)
- Key people: Unknown
- Currency: ₹

Magadh Stock Exchange Association (MSEA) was located in Patna, India. It was established in the year 1986. It is one among the 25 old regional stock exchanges in India. The exchange was disbanded on 3 September 2007 by Securities and Exchange Board of India (SEBI).

== History ==
By 1999–2000, the Magadh Stock Exchange had a total of 199 brokers, out of which 15 were corporate brokers. Among 199 brokers, it was further classified as 183 proprietor brokers, 1 partnership broker and 5 corporate brokers. Then, there were only 2 sub-brokers registered.

In September 2005, the Magadh Stock Exchange was corporatised and demutualised in accordance with the provisions of the Securities Contracts (Regulation) Act, 1956.

On 17 August 2000, the Magadh Stock Exchange became the only regional stock exchange in the country to trade on the National Stock Exchange of India (NSE), the Bombay Stock Exchange (BSE), Calcutta Stock Exchange (CSE) and the Interconnected Stock Exchange (ISE) when the exchange finally got connected to the NSE through ISE.

SEBI vide order dated September 3, 2007 refused to renew the recognition granted to Magadh Stock Exchange Ltd. On SEBI website, Magadh Stock Exchange shows "valid upto as permanent" but it is clearly mentioned that its renewal has been refused.

== See also ==
- List of South Asian stock exchanges
- List of stock exchanges in the Commonwealth of Nations
- Economy of Bihar
