= Economy of Ludhiana =

Economy of Ludhiana, Punjab, India
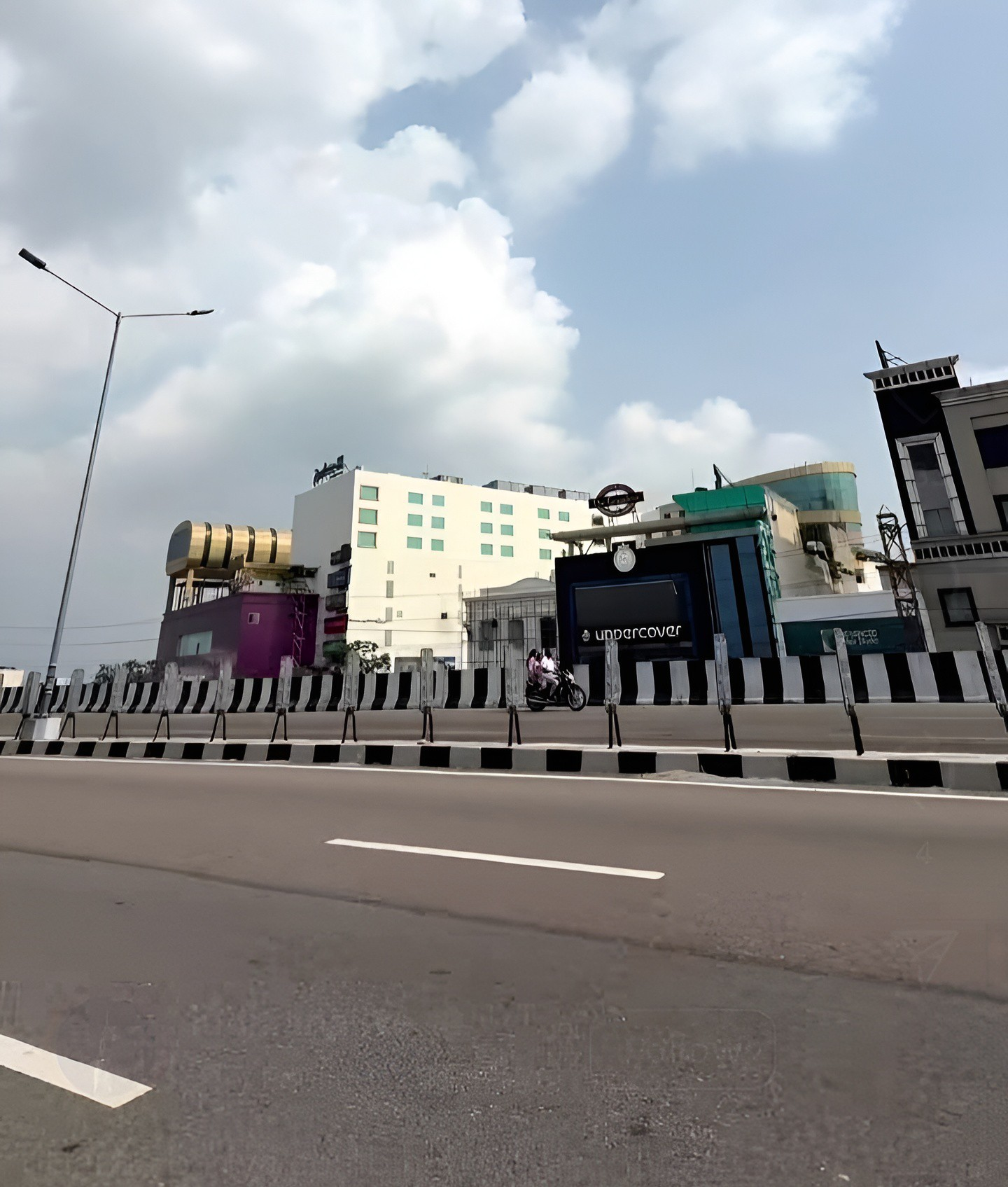

Statistics
- GDP: ₹1,250,000,000,000 (US$13 billion) (City) ₹1,800,000,000,000 (US$19 billion) (Metro Area) (2026 est.)
- All values, unless otherwise stated, are in US dollars.

Ludhiana is the largest city and largest industrial hub in Punjab, India. It is the biggest city north of Delhi. It is known for hosiery and bicycle manufacturing.

As of 2014 Ludhiana had 19.1 percent of Punjab's employment.

== Textile industry ==
Before Partition, Lahore was the biggest industrial hub of Punjab. Then industry moved and settled in Ludhiana. Ludhiana became very important in India for its hosiery and textile industry. Now Ludhiana is Punjab's and (after Delhi) North India's largest city.

Vardhman Group is a textile group based there. Vardhman was established in 1965 by Lala Rattan Chand Oswal. The group is engaged in manufacturing and trading in yarn, fabric, sewing thread, acrylic fibre and alloy steel.

== Ludhiana Stock Exchange ==
LSC was established in the year 1983. By 1999, the exchange had a total of 284 brokers, out of which 79 were corporate brokers. Among 284 brokers, it was further classified as 212 proprietor broker, 2 partnership broker and 70 corporate broker. Then, there was only 2 sub- brokers registered. It has branches in Jalandhar, Amritsar and Chandigarh.
