= Rangaswamy Narasimhan =

Indian computer and cognitive scientist

- Born: 17 April 1926; Chennai, Tamil Nadu, India
- Died: 3 September 2007 (aged 81); Bengaluru, Karnataka, India
- Occupations: Computer and cognitive scientist
- Years active: 1954-2007
- Known for: TIFRAC-the first Indian indigenous computer
- Awards: Padma Shri; Jawaharlal Nehru Fellowship; UGC Homi J. Bhabha Award; Om Prakash Bhasin Award; Dataquest Lifetime Achievement Award

Rangaswamy Narasimhan (April 17, 1926 – September 3, 2007) was an Indian computer and cognitive scientist, regarded by many as the father of computer science research in India. He led the team which developed the TIFRAC, the first Indian indigenous computer and was instrumental in the establishment of CMC Limited in 1975, a Government of India company, later bought by Tata Consultancy Services. He was a recipient of the fourth highest Indian civilian award of Padma Shri from the Government of India in 1977.

== Early life and education ==
Dr. Narasimhan was a pioneer in the field of computer sciences in India and the principal architect of India’s first indigenous computer, TIFRAC. I would rate him as the scientific equivalent of the linguist-philosopher Dr. Noam Chomsky in this country for his work relating to language, linguistics and cognitive sciences, said M. G. K. Menon, on hearing about Narasimhan's death.

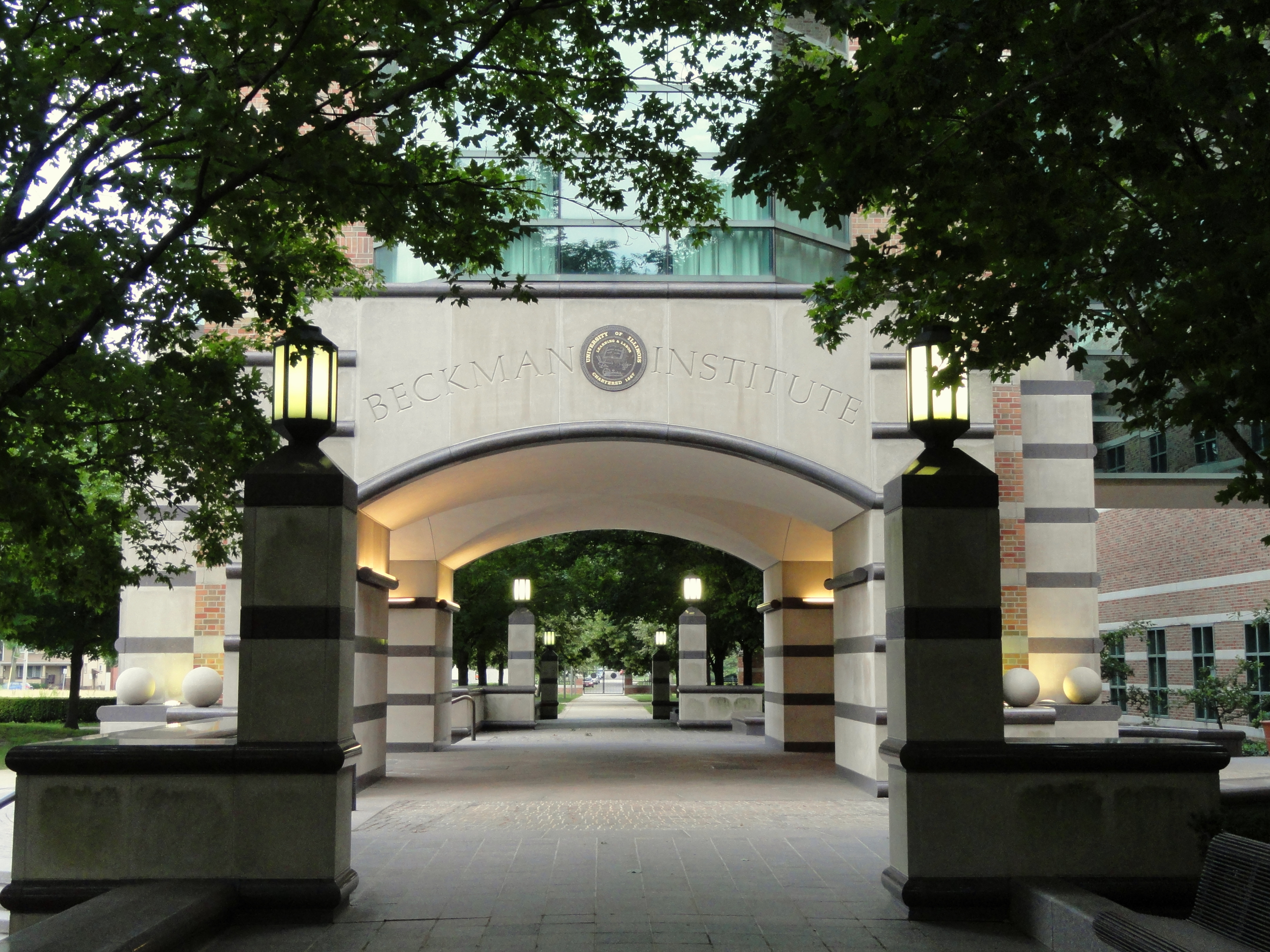
The Beckman Institute for Advanced Science and Technology at University of Illinois at Urbana–Champaign. Narasimhan's early researches were hosted by the university

Rangaswamy Narasimhan was born on 17 April 1926 in Chennai in the south Indian state of Tamil Nadu. He graduated with honours in Telecommunication Engineering from College of Engineering, Guindy, then part of University of Madras in 1947 and moved to US to obtain his master's degree (MS) in electrical engineering from the California Institute of Technology. He stayed in US to secure a doctoral degree (PhD) in mathematics from Indiana University.

== Career ==
In 1954, he returned to India, accepting Homi J. Bhabha's invitation to join the project team set up by the Tata Institute of Fundamental Research, (TIFR) Mumbai for the development of the first indigenous computer. Five years later, the prototype of the computer was ready and the computer was inaugurated by the then prime minister of India, Jawaharlal Nehru, who named the equipment as Tata Institute of Fundamental Research Automatic Calculator (TIFRAC). In 1961, he went back to Illinois, US to conduct further research on cognitive science at the University of Illinois at Urbana–Champaign and worked as a visiting scientist at the Digital Computer Laboratory of the university till 1964. His next assignment at TIFR was the establishment of a software development centre and that is reported to have paved way for the founding of the National Center for Software Development and Computing Techniques (NCSDCT) under TIFR. The institution was later renamed as the National Centre for Software Technology and was merged into the Centre for Development of Advanced Computing (C-DAC) in 2003.

In August 1963, the Government of India set up an interdepartmental Electronics Committee under the chairmanship of Vikram Sarabhai for finding ways for self-sufficiency in the electronics industry sector and Narasimhan was made the chairman of one of the sub committees, entrusted with the responsibility to look into the possibilities of finding ways to reduce dependence on IBM and International Computers Limited. One of the recommendations of Narasimhan Committee was to establish a national organization for manufacture and maintenance of computers which was later endorsed by the Electronics Commission, headed by M. G. K. Menon, and Narasimhan was entrusted with the responsibility which resulted in the formation of Computer Maintenance Corporation, later day CMC Limited as a fully owned government company in 1977 with Narasimhan as its founder chairman. He was also connected with TIFR at their National Centre for Software Development Computing Techniques from 1975 to 1985.

Narasimhan was associated with several agencies and organizations for his research; the Industrial Design Centre at Indian Institute of Technology Bombay, the Speech Pathology Unit of Topiwala National Medical College and Nair Hospital, the All India Institute of Speech and Hearing, the Central Institute of Indian Languages, the Indira Gandhi National Centre for the Arts, and the Centre for Applied Cognitive Science at the Ontario Institute for Studies in Education, Toronto were some of them. He sat on the council of the International Federation for Information Processing as the representative of India during 1975-86 and was a member of the Scientific Advisory Council of the Indo-French Centre for the Promotion of Advanced Research from 1988 to 1990. He retired from TIFR service in 1990 as a professor of eminence but retained his association with CMC past his retirement in the capacity as an advisor even after the company was bought by Tata Consultancy Services in 2001. He died on 3 September 2007, at the age of 81, in Bengaluru in Karnataka.

== Legacy ==
Besides the contributions in the development of the first Indian computer and founding of CMC and the National Center for Software Development and Computing Techniques, Narasimhan was involved in bringing the computer sector in India together and was successful in founding a society, the Computer Society of India in 1964 and became its founder president, a post he held till 1969. He was involved in research in the area of the theory of behaviour, extending his studies to first language acquisition, artificial intelligence, computational modelling of behaviour and modelling language behaviour, and was reported to be the first to discover an analogy between ″formal grammars of natural languages and the formal structures underlying picture processing″. He carried on his research on synthetic pattern recognition during his stint at the University of Illinois from 1961 to 1964 into TIFR and ″developed a meta theory and approach to the study of language behaviour″. His argument was that the use of behaviour to specific uses must have been evolutionary and as such, use must define the structure or mechanism. This was the topic of his book, Modeling Language Behaviour, which is considered to have offered alternatives to the concepts of Noam Chomsky, drawing comparisons with the American cognitive scientist.

Narasimhan studied the environment a child (9 months to 3 years) is exposed to while he or she acquired their first language. This ethological study of language behaviour acquisition led him to the discovery that the pre-literate oral language behaviour differed from the literate language behaviour and while the former is genetic, the latter is acquired. He postulated that this difference was analogous to connectionist Artificial Intelligence that included non literate modes of functioning and rule-based Artificial Intelligence. His book, Artificial Intelligence and the Study of Agentive Behaviour, released in 2004, details his findings. The book is reported to have propounded a new understanding of early education of children.

Narasimhan's studies in the 1960s and 70s at Illinois on computational modeling of visual behaviour is known to have proposed a new grammar for analysing the visually given image. In order to have a better understanding, his team at Illinois developed a new language by name, PAX, and the group worked on developing a hardware working on PAX to analyse the retinal image but the project was abandoned after a while. Besides several articles written in peer-reviewed journals, he published two more books, between the release of Modeling Language Behaviour and Artificial Intelligence and the Study of Agentive Behaviour, released in 1998 and 2004 respectively. Both the books, Language Behaviour: Acquisition and Evolutionary History and Characterising Literacy: A Study of Western and Indian Literacy Experiences were published by Sage Publications. He was also associated with the publication of the book, The Dynamics of Technology: Creation and Diffusion of Skills and Knowledge as an editor and edited the 1993 special issue of Current Science featuring Artificial Intelligence.

== Awards and honours ==
Rangaswamy Narasimhan was an elected fellow of the Indian National Science Academy (INSA), Indian Academy of Sciences, The National Academy of Sciences, India and the Computer Society of India and held the Jawaharlal Nehru Fellowship from 1971 to 1973. He received the Homi J. Bhabha Award from the University Grants Commission in 1976 and the Government of India awarded him the civilian honour of Padma Shri in 1977. The Om Prakash Bhasin Award was conferred on him in 1988 and Dataquest magazine selected him for their Lifetime Achievement Award in 1994.
