= Refinery Movement in Assam =

1956-1957 Indian agitation and protest

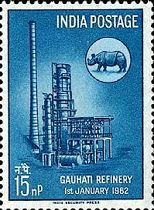
- Postage stamp published on occasion of Inauguration of Guwahati Refinery
- Date: 1956–1957
- Location: Assam
- Caused by: The decision taken by union government to set up a refinery in Barauni instead of Assam with the crude oil produced in Assam
- Goals: Set up of Oil Refinery in Guwahati
- Methods: Resolution taken in Assam Assembly, hartal, lathi-charge, use of tear gas

The Refinery Movement in Assam was an agitation, which took place in 1956-57, protesting against the decision of the Union Government to set up a refinery at Barauni in Bihar instead of Assam with the crude oil produced in Assam. At that time, the largest oil field in India since independence was discovered in Naharkatiya, Assam. The new field was expected to produce 1.5 million tonnes of crude oil per annum, which would meet one-third of the country's needs in the next three years. However, with this crude oil, the Assam Oil Corporation advocated to set up refinery in Kolkata and the Government of India in Barauni.

== Background ==
After India gained independence, India's largest oil field was discovered in Naharkatiya in Upper Assam. The new field was expected to produce 2.5 million tonnes of crude oil per annum, which would meet one-third of India's oil demand within the next three years. Naturally, a new refinery was needed and in 1956 the Government of India started talks with the Assam Oil Company and the Burma Oil Company on various issues related to the refinery. A committee of experts advocated setting up the proposed refinery in Kolkata. The committee also proposed the names of two other places, Dhubri in Assam and Barauni in Bihar. However, the Government of India intended to set up a refinery at Barauni.

The Government of India decided to build the refinery in the public sector. However, the Assam Oil Company has made it clear that they will not participate in this enterprising, if the refinery is built in the public sector. Under such circumstances, the Government of India needed huge funds and technical assistance. Finally, in 1957, a company was set up to build the refinery, in which the Burma Oil Company would hold two-thirds participation and the Government of India would hold one-third.

== Events ==
A resolution was passed in the Assam Legislative Assembly on 3 April 1956 to establish a refinery in Assam; However, the Government of India did not give any definite commitment in this regard. The first wide-scale protest in Assam demanding a refinery took place on 28 August 1956. The protest was led by the opposition in Assam Assembly and by Hareswar Goswami, the President of the All Assam Oil Refineries Action Committee. All shops, offices and educational institutions were closed on that day. Train and bus services were interrupted. Rallies and public meetings were held in verious places. There were clashes between police and protesters in Nagaon. Police resorted to lathicharge and use of tear gas in Guwahati. A total of 306 protesters were arrested.

In the Assembly session of August–September 1956, there was a lot of debate about the August 28 hartal. Chief Minister Bishnuram Medhi termed the strike as "unjustifiable" and said the central government had not accepted the advice of the Assam Oil Corporation to set up a refinery in Kolkata and the government had been considering the matter from the perspective of Assam. Medhi criticised the role of Hareshwar Goswami and said that decisions on the location of the refinery cannot be decided on the streets; It can only be decided through a cool and impartial discussion.

As a result of public pressure and continuous discussions between the Government of Assam and the Government of India, an eleven-member expert committee headed by S Bashishta, Advisor to the Ministry of Railways was constituted to review the matter. The committee reviewed mainly the technical aspects, not the demands of Assam. When the Prime Minister Jawaharlal Nehru visited Assam on 18 October 1956, hundreds of people protested with various slogans and festoons demanding an oil refinery. A delegation of the Action Committee met the Prime Minister and asked him to set up an expert committee to look into the issue of setting up refinery in Assam and find ways to deal with the problems arising in this regard.

In June 1957, ignoring Assam's demand, the Government of India decided to set up an oil refinery in Barauni; As a result, there was an explosion of anger in Assam. On June 17, all the members of the Assam Legislative Assembly, irrespective of party affiliation, came out. They argued that the set up a refinery in Assam is essential for the development of petroleum-based industries, rail transport and employment generation. Newspapers and magazines have also been constantly publishing articles and public letters in this regard. On June 28 and 29, a conference of the Refinery Action Committee was held under the chairmanship of Hareshwar Goswami, in which representatives from all districts of Assam were present. Criticising strongly to the central government, the conference announced a protest programme.

== Result ==
Accepting the demands of the people of Assam, the Government of India prepared a separate plan to study the feasibility of setting up a refinery in Assam and Barauni. The Foster Wheeler Company was commissioned to advise the Planning Commission in this regard. Finally, the government decided to set up two public sector refineries with a capacity of 1 million metric tonnes at Nunmati (Guwahati) and Barauni under the Indian Oil Corporation. The Guwahati Refinery started production in 1962. The refinery was inaugurated on January 1, 1962 by the then Prime Minister of India, Jawaharlal Nehru.
