= MSEA =

MSEA may refer to:

- Mainland Southeast Asia, or Indochina
  - Mainland Southeast Asia linguistic area
- Magadh Stock Exchange Association
- Maine State Employees Association, the public sector union in Maine
- MapleStory Southeast Asia
- Metabolite Set Enrichment Analysis, a bioinformatics tool
- Minnesota School Employees Association, an independent public sector union of classified (non-certified) public school staff in Minnesota.
