= Zen Technologies =

Indian defense technology company

Zen Technologies Limited
- Company type: Public
- Traded as: NSE: ZENTEC; BSE: ZEN
- Industry: Defence technology
- Founded: 1993
- Headquarters: Hyderabad, Telangana, India
- Key people: Kishore Dutt Atluri (Co-founder, President & Joint Managing Director); Ashok Atluri (Co-founder, Chairman & Managing Director); Ravi Midathala (Co-founder)

Zen Technologies Limited is an Indian defense technology company headquartered in Hyderabad, Telangana. The company manufactures training simulators, counter-drone systems, and integrated defense technologies for military and law enforcement agencies. The company is listed on the National Stock Exchange of India and the Bombay Stock Exchange.

== History ==
Zen Technologies was established in 1993 to develop computer-based training systems for defense and security sectors, with early operations focused on small arms and driving simulators. The company became a public entity in 2000 through an initial public offering on the Hyderabad Stock Exchange. Its shares were later listed on the Bombay Stock Exchange in March 2011 and on the National Stock Exchange on March 30, 2015.

During the 2000s, the company expanded its portfolio to include tactical engagement and weapon-specific simulators. At Defexpo 2006, Zen announced a technical collaboration with Saab Training Systems of Sweden and established a production unit in Himachal Pradesh. During this period, the company introduced a driver training simulator and the BMP II integrated missile and driving simulator. A manufacturing and integration facility was commissioned at Maheshwaram, near Hyderabad, in 2009. In the early 2010s, the company added armored-vehicle and gunnery simulators to its offerings, including a tank simulator in 2011 and a multi-simulator system in 2013. Development continued with a combat training center and range-control systems in 2015, followed by a containerized shooting range in 2016.

== Acquisitions ==
In August 2018, Zen Technologies approved the purchase of a 51 percent stake in Unistring Tech Solutions, a Hyderabad-based firm focused on electronic warfare and communications. The transaction was finalized in May 2019, making Unistring a subsidiary. In February 2024, the company acquired a 51 percent stake in AITuring Technologies, an electro-optics and robotics firm. Following a subsequent share issue in 2025, Zen's holding was reduced to 49 percent, and AiTuring was reclassified as an associate.

In February 2025, Zen announced the acquisition of a controlling interest in Applied Research International and its affiliate ARI Labs, providers of marine and naval simulation systems. Zen initially obtained a majority stake before purchasing the remaining shares to make it a wholly owned subsidiary. During the same month, the company acquired a 51 percent stake in Vector Technics, which focuses on propulsion and power-distribution for unmanned aerial vehicles, and 45.33 percent of Bhairav Robotics. Vector Technics is operated as a subsidiary, while Bhairav Robotics is accounted for as an associate.

In July 2025, Zen completed the purchase of 54.67 percent of TISA Aerospace, a developer of loitering munitions. Later that year, the company acquired 76 percent of Anawave Systems & Solutions, a developer of naval simulation and training systems, which was subsequently classified as a subsidiary.

== See also ==
- Defence industry of India
- Military simulation
