= Noonmati =

- Suburb
- Location in Assam, India Noonmati (Assam)
- Coordinates: 26.18°N 91.80°E
- Country: India
- State: Assam
- District: Kamrup Metropolitan
- City: Guwahati
- Elevation: 54 m (177 ft)

Languages
  - Official: Assamese
- Time zone: UTC+5:30 (IST)
- Postal code: 781020
- Vehicle registration: AS

Noonmati is a locality located in Guwahati, Assam in North East India.

It is the place where Indian Oil Company (now the Indian Oil Corporation) commissioned its first oil refinery, the Guwahati Refinery on 1 January 1962.

== Geography ==
Noonmati is located at 26.18°N 91.80°E. It has an average elevation of 54 m (177 ft).

== Transportation ==
Noonmati railway station is situated at Noonmati in Guwahati–Lumding section.
