= Homi J. Bhabha =

Indian nuclear physicist (1909–1966)

Homi J. Bhabha FNI FASc FRS
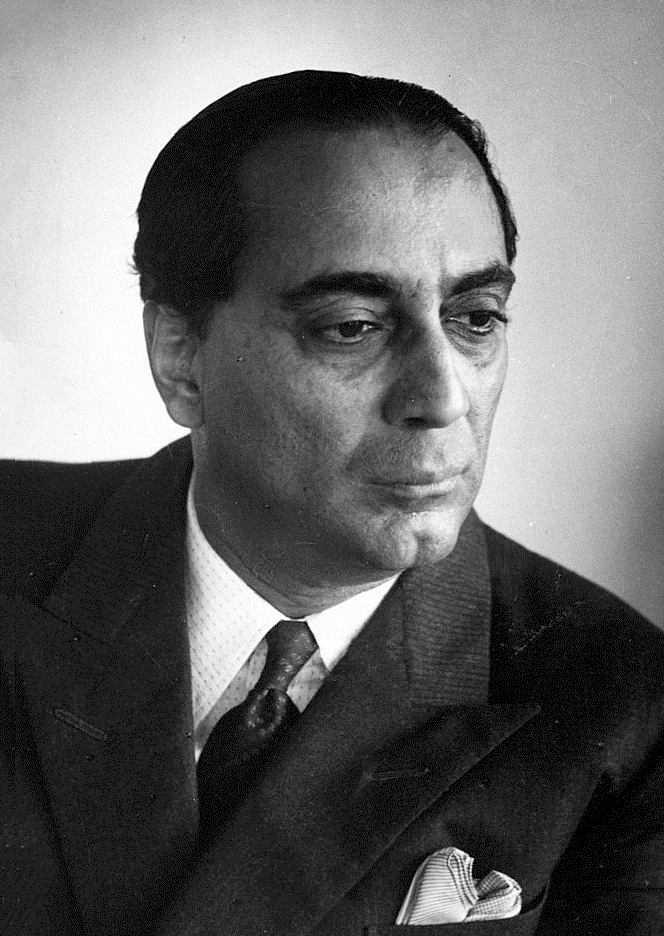
- Indian physicist Bhabha c. 1960s

Chairperson of the Atomic Energy Commission of India
- In office 1948–1966
- Preceded by: position established
- Succeeded by: Vikram Sarabhai

Personal details
- Born: Homi Jehangir Bhabha; 30 October 1909 Bombay, Bombay Presidency, British India (Present-day Mumbai, Maharashtra, India)
- Died: 24 January 1966 (aged 56) Mont Blanc massif, France
- Cause of death: Air India Flight 101 crash
- Relatives: Petit family; Tata family
- Scientific career
- Education: University of Cambridge (BA, PhD)
- Known for: Indian nuclear programme; Cascade process of Cosmic radiations; point particles; Bhabha Scattering; Theoretical prediction of Muon
- Awards: Adams Prize (1942); Padma Bhushan (1954); Fellow of the Royal Society
- Fields: Nuclear physics
- Workplaces: Atomic Energy Commission of India; Tata Institute of Fundamental Research; Cavendish Laboratory; Indian Institute of Science; Trombay Atomic Energy Establishment
- Doctoral advisor: Ralph H. Fowler
- Other academic advisors: Paul Dirac

Homi Jehangir Bhabha (30 October 1909 – 24 January 1966) was an Indian nuclear theoretical physicist who is widely credited as the "father of the Indian nuclear programme". He was the founding director and professor of physics at the Tata Institute of Fundamental Research (TIFR), as well as the founding director of the Atomic Energy Establishment, Trombay (AEET) which was renamed the Bhabha Atomic Research Centre in his honour. TIFR and AEET served as the cornerstone to the Indian nuclear energy and weapons programme. He was the first chairman of the Indian Atomic Energy Commission (AEC) and secretary of the Department of Atomic Energy (DAE). By supporting space science projects which initially derived their funding from the AEC, he played an important role in the birth of the Indian space programme.

Bhabha was awarded the Adams Prize (1942) and Padma Bhushan (1954), and nominated for the Nobel Prize for Physics in 1951 and 1953–1956. He died in the crash of Air India Flight 101 in 1966, at the age of 56.

== Early life ==
=== Childhood ===
Homi Jehangir Bhabha was born on 30 October 1909 into a wealthy Parsi family comprising Jehangir Hormusji Bhabha, a well-known lawyer, and Meherbai Framji Panday, granddaughter of Sir Dinshaw Maneckji Petit. He was named Hormusji after his paternal grandfather, Hormusji Bhabha, who was Inspector-General of Education in Mysore. He received his early studies at Mumbai's Cathedral and John Connon School.

Bhabha's upbringing instilled in him an appreciation for music, painting and gardening. He often visited his paternal aunt Meherbai Tata, who owned a Western classical music collection which included the works of Beethoven, Mozart, Haydn and Schubert. Together with his brother and his cousin, it was a ritual for him to listen to records from this collection over the gramophone. Bhabha also received special violin and piano lessons.

His tutor in sketching and painting was the artist Jehangir Lalkaka. At seventeen, Bhabha's self-portrait won second place at the prestigious Bombay Art Society's exhibition.

Tending to a terrace garden of exotic plants and cross-bred Bougainvillea and Roses, Hormusji was an expert on trees, plants and flowers. He kept books on gardening in the house's large private library.

Bhabha showed signs of precocity in the sciences. As a child, he spent hours playing with Meccano sets, and was fond of building his own models rather than following the booklets that accompanied the sets. By fifteen, he had studied general relativity.

Bhabha frequently visited the home of his uncle Dorabji Tata, chairman of the conglomerate Tata Group and then one of the wealthiest men in India. There, he was privy to conversations Dorabji had with national leaders of the independence movement, like Mahatma Gandhi and Motilal Nehru, as well as business dealings in industries like steel, heavy chemicals and hydroelectric power which the Tata Group invested in. John Cockcroft remarked that overhearing these conversations should have inspired Bhabha's career as a scientific organizer.

=== University studies in India ===
Though he passed his Senior Cambridge Examination with honours at the age of fifteen, he was too young to join any college abroad. So, he enrolled in Elphinstone College. He then attended the Royal Institute of Science in 1927, where he witnessed a public lecture by Arthur Compton, who would win the Nobel Prize in physics the next year for his 1923 discovery of the Compton effect. Bhabha later said that he first heard of cosmic rays, the subject of his future research, at this lecture.

=== University studies in Cambridge ===
The following year, he joined Gonville and Caius College of Cambridge University. This was due to the insistence of his father and his uncle Dorabji, who planned for Bhabha to obtain a degree in mechanical engineering from Cambridge and then return to India, where he would join the Tata Steel mills in Jamshedpur as a metallurgist.

Within a year of joining Cambridge University, Bhabha wrote to his father:

I seriously say to you that business or job as an engineer is not the thing for me. It is totally foreign to my nature and radically opposed to my temperament and opinions. Physics is my line. I know I shall do great things here. For, each man can do best and excel in only that thing of which he is passionately fond, in which he believes, as I do, that he has the ability to do it, that he is in fact born and destined to do it … I am burning with a desire to do physics. I will and must do it sometime. It is my only ambition. I have no desire to be a "successful" man or the head of a big firm. There are intelligent people who like that and let them do it. … It is no use saying to Beethoven "You must be a scientist for it is great thing" when he did not care two hoots for science; or to Socrates "Be an engineer; it is work of intelligent man". It is not in the nature of things. I therefore earnestly implore you to let me do physics.

Sympathetic to his son's predicament, Bhabha's father agreed to finance his studies in mathematics provided that he obtain first class on his Mechanical Tripos. Bhabha sat the Mechanical Tripos in June 1930 and the Mathematics Tripos two years later, passing both with first-class honours.

Bhabha coxed for his college in boat races and designed the cover of his college magazine the Caian. He also designed the sets for a student performance of Pedro Calderón de la Barca's play Life is a Dream and Mozart's Idomeneo for the Cambridge Musical Society. Encouraged by the English artist and art critic Roger Fry, who praised his sketches, Bhabha seriously considered becoming an artist. However, exposure to work being done at the Cavendish Laboratory at the time motivated Bhabha to focus on theoretical physics. When he registered as a research student in mathematics, he decided to change his name to Homi Jehangir Bhabha, the name he would keep for the rest of his life.

== Early research in nuclear physics ==
Bhabha worked at the Cavendish Laboratory while working towards his PhD degree in theoretical physics supervised by Ralph Fowler. At the time, the laboratory was the centre of several breakthroughs in experimental physics. James Chadwick had discovered the neutron, John Cockcroft and Ernest Walton had transmuted lithium with high-energy protons, Francis Aston had discovered chemical isotopes, and Patrick Blackett and Giuseppe Occhialini had used cloud chambers to demonstrate the production of electron pairs and showers by gamma radiation.

In 1931, Bhabha held the Salomons studentship in engineering. In 1932, on a Rouse Ball travelling studentship, he visited Copenhagen, Zurich and Utrecht. Niels Bohr's institute at Copenhagen was a major hub of theoretical physics research. At Zurich, Bhabha wrote his first paper in July 1933 with Wolfgang Pauli, which was published in the Zeitschrift fur physik in October 1933. During his studentship, Bhabha also visited Hans Kramers, who was then a professor conducting theoretical research in the interaction of electromagnetic waves with matter at Utrecht University. In 1933, Bhabha was selected for the Isaac Newton scholarship, which he held for the next three years and used to fund his time working with Enrico Fermi at the Institute of Physics in Rome. The same year, Bhabha published his first paper on the role of electron showers in absorbing gamma radiation.

The discovery of the positron in 1932 and the formulation of Dirac's hole theory to explain its properties had catalysed the creation of the field of high-energy physics. Bhabha chose to make this field the focus of his career, publishing over fifty papers on the topic during his lifetime. He played a key role in the early development of quantum electrodynamics.

Bhabha received his doctorate in nuclear physics in 1935 for his thesis titled "On cosmic radiation and the creation and annihilation of positrons and electrons".

In 1935, Bhabha published a paper in the Proceedings of the Royal Society in which he first calculated the cross-section of electron-positron scattering. Electron-positron scattering was later named Bhabha scattering after him.

In 1937, with Walter Heitler, he co-authored a paper, "The passage of fast electrons and the theory of cosmic showers" in the Proceedings of the Royal Society, Series A, in which they used their theory to describe how primary cosmic rays from outer space interact with the upper atmosphere to produce particles observed at the ground level. Bhabha and Heitler then made numerical estimates of the number of electrons in the cascade process at different altitudes for different electron initiation energies. The calculations agreed with the experimental observations of cosmic ray showers made by Bruno Rossi and Pierre Victor Auger a few years before. Bhabha and Heitler postulated that the penetrating component of cosmic radiation comprised "heavy electrons", most of which "must have masses nearer to hundred times the electron mass". The paper was announced in a letter in Nature.

The same year, Seth Neddermeyer and Carl David Anderson, among others, also reached similar conclusions in independently published papers in Physical Review. Before pions were discovered, observers often confused muons with mesons. When Bhabha's collaborator Heitler made him aware of Hideki Yukawa's 1935 paper on the theory of the meson, Bhabha realized that this particle was the postulated "heavy electron". In a 1939 note to Nature, Bhabha argued the particle should be christened the "meson" in line with the word's Greek etymology, not "mesotron" as Anderson had proposed. Bhabha later concluded that observations of the properties of the meson would lead to the straightforward experimental verification of the time dilation phenomenon predicted by Albert Einstein's theory of relativity.

So far, Bhabha's work had been supported by the Senior Studentship of the 1851 exhibition, which he had received for three years, starting in 1936, while continuing to be based in Gonville and Caius College. In 1939, Bhabha was awarded a Royal Society grant to work in P. M. S. Blackett's laboratory in Manchester. However, when World War II broke out, Bhabha found himself unable to return to England to take up the assignment.

== Career ==
=== Indian Institute of Science ===
Bhabha had returned to India for his annual vacation before the start of World War II in September 1939. War prompted him to remain in India, where he accepted a post of reader in physics at the Indian Institute of Science in Bengaluru headed by Nobel laureate C.V. Raman. In 1940, the Sir Dorabji Tata Trust supported his experimental cosmic ray physics research with a grant.

Bhabha was made a Fellow of the Royal Society in 1941, and the following year he became the first Indian to receive the Adams Prize. Soon after receiving the Adams Prize, Bhabha was also made a Fellow of the Indian Academy of Sciences and President of the Physics section of the Indian Sciences Congress. While introducing him at the 1941 Annual Meeting of the Indian Academy of Sciences, C.V. Raman described the 32-year-old Bhabha as "the modern equivalent of Leonardo da Vinci". On 20 January 1942, Bhabha formally accepted professorship and leadership of the Cosmic Ray Research Unit.

During his time at the Indian Institute of Science, Bhabha collaborated with mathematician B. S. Madhava Rao of Central College, Bangalore on relativistic wave equations for higher-spin particles. Their joint paper "The scattering of charged mesons" appeared in the Proceedings of the Indian Academy of Sciences in 1941; the algebraic framework subsequently developed, including work co-authored with K. Venkatachaliengar, was published in the Proceedings of the Royal Society in 1946 and is now known in physics literature as the Bhabha–Madhavarao theory.

As late as 1940, Bhabha was listing his affiliation as "at present at the Department of Physics, Indian Institute of Science, Bangalore", suggesting that he viewed his time in India as a temporary period before his return to the UK. In 1941, he wrote to Robert Millikan that he hoped that the war would be over soon, so that "we can all turn again in more favourable conditions to purely scientific activity". Though he had hoped to work in Caltech, it was impossible for Millikan to invite him there. The restrictions on finance imposed by the war also made it impossible for Wolfgang Pauli to invite Bhabha to Princeton.

During his time in Bengaluru, Bhabha met Vikram and Mrinalini Sarabhai as part of a group interested in Indian culture, and developed an appreciation for Indian architectural and artistic heritage on his tours around the country. In a 1944 letter, he expressed a change of mind and a desire to stay in India:

I had the idea that after the war I would accept a job in a good university in Europe or America. … But in the last two years I have come more and more to the view that provided proper appreciation and financial support are forthcoming, it is one's duty to stay in one's own country.

=== Tata Institute of Fundamental Research ===
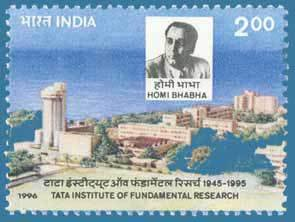
Stamp issued in 1996 by the Government of India commemorating the Tata Institute of Fundamental Research

In 1943, Bhabha wrote to J. R. D. Tata proposing the establishment of an institute of fundamental research. Tata wrote back:

If you and some of your friends in the scientific world will put up concrete proposals backed by a sound case I think there is a very good chance that the Sir Dorabji Tata Trust will respond. After all, the advancement of science of one of the fundamental objectives with which the Tata Trusts were founded, and they have already rendered useful service in that field. If they are shown that they can give still more valuable help in a new way, I am quite sure that they will give it their most serious consideration.

In a letter to the astrophysicist Subrahmanyan Chandrasekhar, Bhabha described that his ambition was to "bring together as many outstanding scientists as possible … so as to build up in time an intellectual atmosphere approaching what we knew in places like Cambridge and Paris." J. R. D. Tata's enthusiasm encouraged Bhabha to send a proposal in March 1944 to Sir Sorab Saklavata, the chairman of the Sir Dorabji Tata Trust, for establishing a school dedicated to research in fundamental physics. In his proposal he wrote:

There is at the moment in India no big school of research in the fundamental problems of physics, both theoretical and experimental. There are, however, scattered all over India competent workers who are not doing as good work as they would do if brought together in one place under proper direction. It is absolutely in the interest of India to have a vigorous school of research in fundamental physics, for such a school forms the spearhead of research not only in less advanced branches of physics but also in problems of immediate practical application in industry. If much of the applied research done in India today is disappointing or of very inferior quality it is entirely due to the absence of a sufficient number of outstanding pure research workers who would set the standard of good research and act on the directing boards in an advisory capacity ... Moreover, when nuclear energy has been successfully applied for power production in say a couple of decades from now, India will not have to look abroad for its experts but will find them ready at hand.

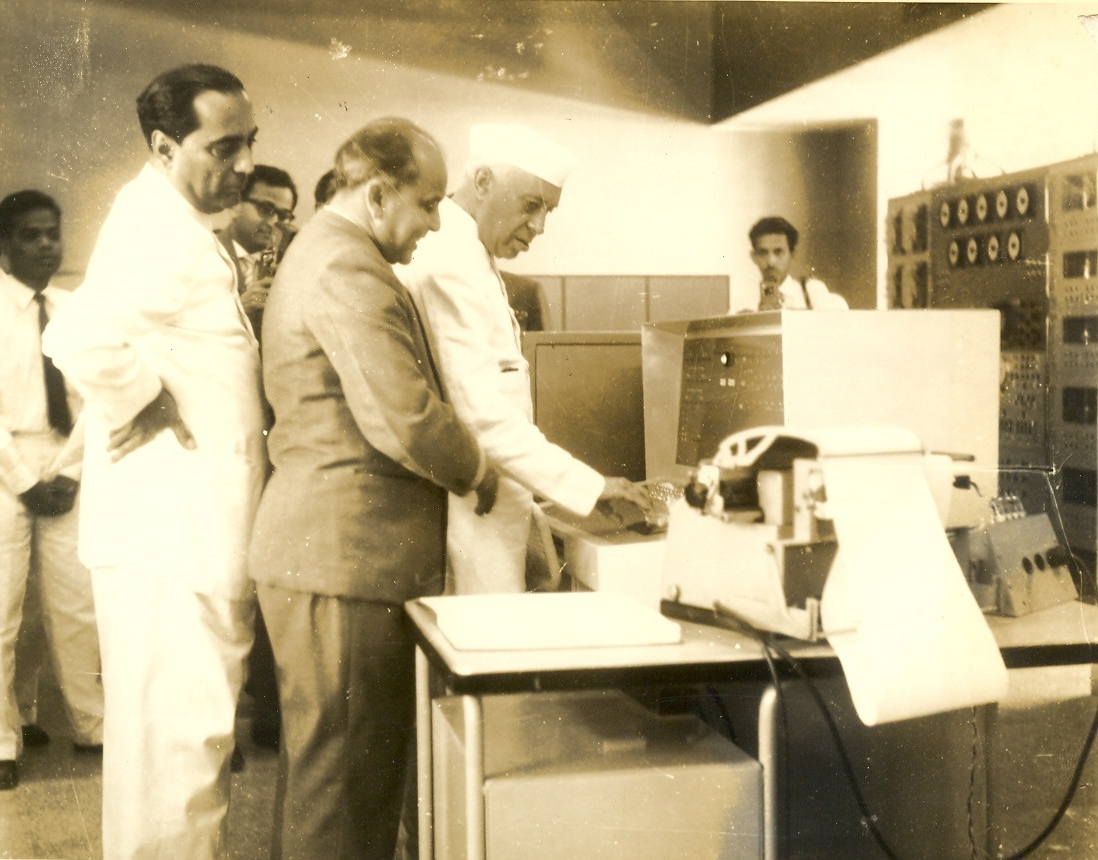
Rangaswamy Narasimhan demonstrating the first Indian digital computer to Jawaharlal Nehru and Homi Bhabha (left) at the Tata Institute of Fundamental Research

The trustees of Sir Dorabji Tata Trust decided to accept Bhabha's proposal and financial responsibility for starting the Institute in April 1944. In June 1945, with a grant from the Trust, he established the Tata Institute of Fundamental Research. While TIFR began functioning in the Cosmic Ray Unit of the Indian Institute of Science Bangalore, by October that year, it had moved to Bombay. TIFR initially operated in 6,000 square feet of the bungalow where Bhabha had been born, with Bhabha taking as his office the very room where he had been born. The institute was moved into the old buildings of the Royal Yacht club in 1948. In 1962, an art gallery designed the Chicago-based firm Holabird & Root architect Helmuth Bartsch was inaugurated at TIFR. Bombay was chosen as the location as the Government of Bombay showed interest in becoming a joint founder of the proposed institute. Inaugurating the Bombay premises in December 1945, the Governor of Bombay Sir John Colville said:

We are embarking on an enterprise of importance to the country's development, in which great wealth, wisely husbanded and applied, individual initiative and government support are all blended. I do not think there could be a better combination for progress.

A former director of TIFR, M. G. K. Menon, said that the institute's budget "grew at the rate of about 30% per annum over the first ten years, and about 15% per annum over the second decade". By 1954, Bhabha had stopped publishing scientific papers but continued to carry out a range of administrative tasks aimed at growing TIFR.

Some of TIFR's research groups focused on nuclear chemistry and metallurgy; these were later moved to Trombay to provide the basis for a 1958 plan to integrate nuclear energy into the national power grid. By 1954, the Institute contained an in-house electronics production unit. Under Bhabha's leadership, the Institute established a research group under Bernard Peters' supervision to conduct research on cosmic rays, and later geophysics. This group was the first to identify K minus strange particles.

Bhabha remained the institute's Director till his death in 1966.

=== India's nuclear energy programme ===
==== Atomic Energy Commission ====
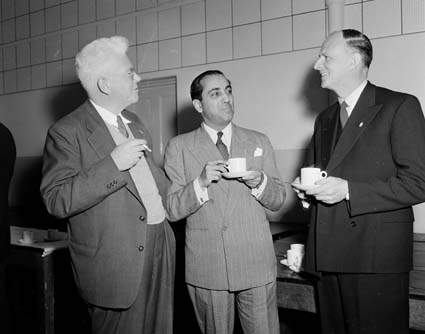
Bhabha (middle) at the "Atomic Power in Australia" symposium in Sydney, Australia in 1954

On 26 April 1948, Bhabha wrote to Prime Minister Jawaharlal Nehru that "the development of atomic energy should be entrusted to a very small and high-powered body composed of say three people with executive power, and answerable directly to the Prime Minister without any intervening link. For brevity, this body may be referred to as the Atomic Energy Commission." Pursuant to the Atomic Energy Act, the Atomic Energy Commission (AEC) was established on 10 August 1948. Nehru appointed Bhabha as the commission's first chairman. The three-member Commission included S. S. Bhatnagar and K. S. Krishnan. Bhabha, Bhatnagar and Krishnan were also named to the Scientific Advisory Committee to the Ministry of Defence created in July 1948. The details of the workings of the AEC were declared state secrets for two reasons according to Nehru: "the advantage of our research would go to others before we even reaped it, and secondly it would become impossible for us to cooperate with any country which is prepared to cooperate with us in this matter, because it will not be prepared for the results of researches to become public."

The scholar George Perkovich argues that due to this secrecy and the AEC's relative freedom from government control, the "Nehru-Bhabha relationship constituted the only potentially real mechanism to check and balance the nuclear programme". Yet, rather than being "watchful and balancing", the relationship was "friendly and symbiotic". Twenty years younger than Nehru, Bhabha addressed him as "Dear Bhai", or "Dear Brother", while Nehru addressed Bhabha as "My dear Homi". Indira Gandhi later recalled that her father always found the time to speak to Bhabha, both because, she claimed, Bhabha brought to him urgent matters that required immediate attention, and because conversations with him afforded Nehru "warm moments of sensitivity that other people take for granted in their everyday life", but which are harder to come by in the life of a politician.

When Bhabha realised that technology development for the atomic energy programme could no longer be carried out within TIFR he proposed to the government to build a new laboratory entirely devoted to this purpose. For this purpose, 1,200 acres (490 ha) of land was acquired at Trombay from the Bombay Government. Thus, the Atomic Energy Establishment Trombay (AEET) started functioning in 1954. The same year, Bhabha was appointed the secretary of the Department of Atomic Energy (DAE) under the direct charge of the Prime Minister. Atomic Energy was established as a separate ministry, where earlier the AEC fell under the umbrella of the Ministry of Natural Resources and Scientific Research.

In a 1957 paper in Nature summarizing the Indian nuclear energy programme's ambitions and work, Bhabha claimed that "although the Atomic Energy Commission was established as an advisory body in 1948 in the Ministry of Natural Resources and Scientific Research, no important effort to develop this work was made until a separate department of the Government of India with the full powers of a ministry was established in August 1954." A former chairman of the AEC, H. N. Sethna, said that until the establishment of the DAE in 1954, "the work of the Atomic Energy Commission had been restricted to the survey of radioactive minerals, setting up plants for processing monazite and limited research activity in the area of electronics, methods of chemical analysis of minerals and the recovery of valuable elements from available minerals."

At the DAE, Bhabha maintained relative autonomy over priority-setting, and throughout the 1950s and the early 1960s, nuclear policy remained little-discussed in the Parliament and in public life.

==== Three-stage plan ====
Bhabha is credited with formulating a strategy of focusing on extracting power from the country's vast thorium reserves rather than its meagre uranium reserves. He presented this plan to the Conference on the Development of Atomic Energy for Peaceful Purposes in New Delhi in November 1954. This thorium-focused strategy stood in marked contrast to all other countries in the world. It became formally adopted by the Indian government in 1958 as India's three-stage nuclear power programme.

Bhabha paraphrased the three-stage approach as follows:

The total reserves of thorium in India amount to over 500,000 tons in the readily extractable form, while the known reserves of uranium are less than a tenth of this. The aim of a long-range atomic power programme in India must therefore be to base the nuclear power generation as soon as possible on thorium rather than uranium... The first generation of atomic power stations based on natural uranium can only be used to start an atomic power programme... The plutonium produced by the first-generation of power stations can be used in a second-generation of power stations designed to produce electric power and convert thorium into U-233, or depleted uranium into more plutonium with breeding gain... The second generation of power stations may be regarded as an intermediate step for the breeder power stations of the third generation all of which would produce more U-238 than they burn in the course of producing power.

In 1952, Indian Rare Earths Limited, a Government-owned company, was established to extract rare earths and thorium from Kerala's monazite sands, with Bhabha serving as its director.

In August 1956, the one-megawatt "swimming-pool" research reactor APSARA was commissioned, making India the first Asian country besides the Soviet Union to have a nuclear reactor. Running on enriched natural uranium fuel supplied by the United Kingdom Atomic Energy Commission and thorium, APSARA represented the first stage of Bhabha's plan: it would be useful in producing plutonium. It also allowed Indian nuclear scientists to carry out experiments, whereas national research in atomic energy earlier had been largely theoretical. Bhabha was able to secure favourable terms for India partly due to his friendship with Sir John Cockcroft, who had been his colleague at the Cavendish laboratory in Cambridge.

That year, India and Canada signed an agreement for the construction of a natural uranium, heavy water-moderated National Research Experimental (NRX) reactor in Trombay. Bhabha's personal friendship with WB Lewis, who headed the Canadian Atomic Energy Agency at the time, proved useful to securing the deal. The reactor, named the Canada India Reactor Utility Service (CIRUS), went critical on 10 July 1960. At forty megawatts, it was the highest-output reactor in Asia at the time, and India's first plutonium source. CIRUS also served as the prototype of the successful Canada Deuterium Uranium (CANDU) reactor type. The reactor's low burn produced a large amount of weapons-grade plutonium, some of which was used in India's 1974 peaceful nuclear explosion.

To supply CIRUS with heavy water, a heavy water plant with an output of 14 metric tonnes per year was commissioned in Nangal. It began operation on 2 August 1962.

In July 1958, Bhabha decided to build a plutonium reprocessing plant in Trombay. Construction of the Phoenix plant, based on the Purex (plutonium-uranium extraction) technique for extracting plutonium from spent fuel, began in 1961 and was completed in mid-1964. Paired with CIRUS, Phoenix produced India's first weapons-grade plutonium in 1964.

Even after the establishment of APSARA, CIRUS, Phoenix and the indigenously produced zero-energy critical reactor ZERLINA, India hadn't actually produced nuclear energy. To remedy this, in 1962, General Electric was commissioned to build two light water-moderated nuclear reactors in Tarapur. Because the Tarapur Atomic Power Stations (TAPS) were fueled by enriched uranium, they didn't fit into Bhabha's three-stage plan. The US' terms for the Tarapur deal, an $80 million loan at 0.75% interest, were highly favourable to India. Bhabha also managed to negotiate the limitation of International Atomic Energy Agency safeguards to the TAPS facility. M. R. Srinivasan, former chairman of the AEC, remarked that Bhabha's success in the Tarapur negotiation would have been a proud achievement for an experienced professional diplomat.

==== International Atomic Energy Agency ====
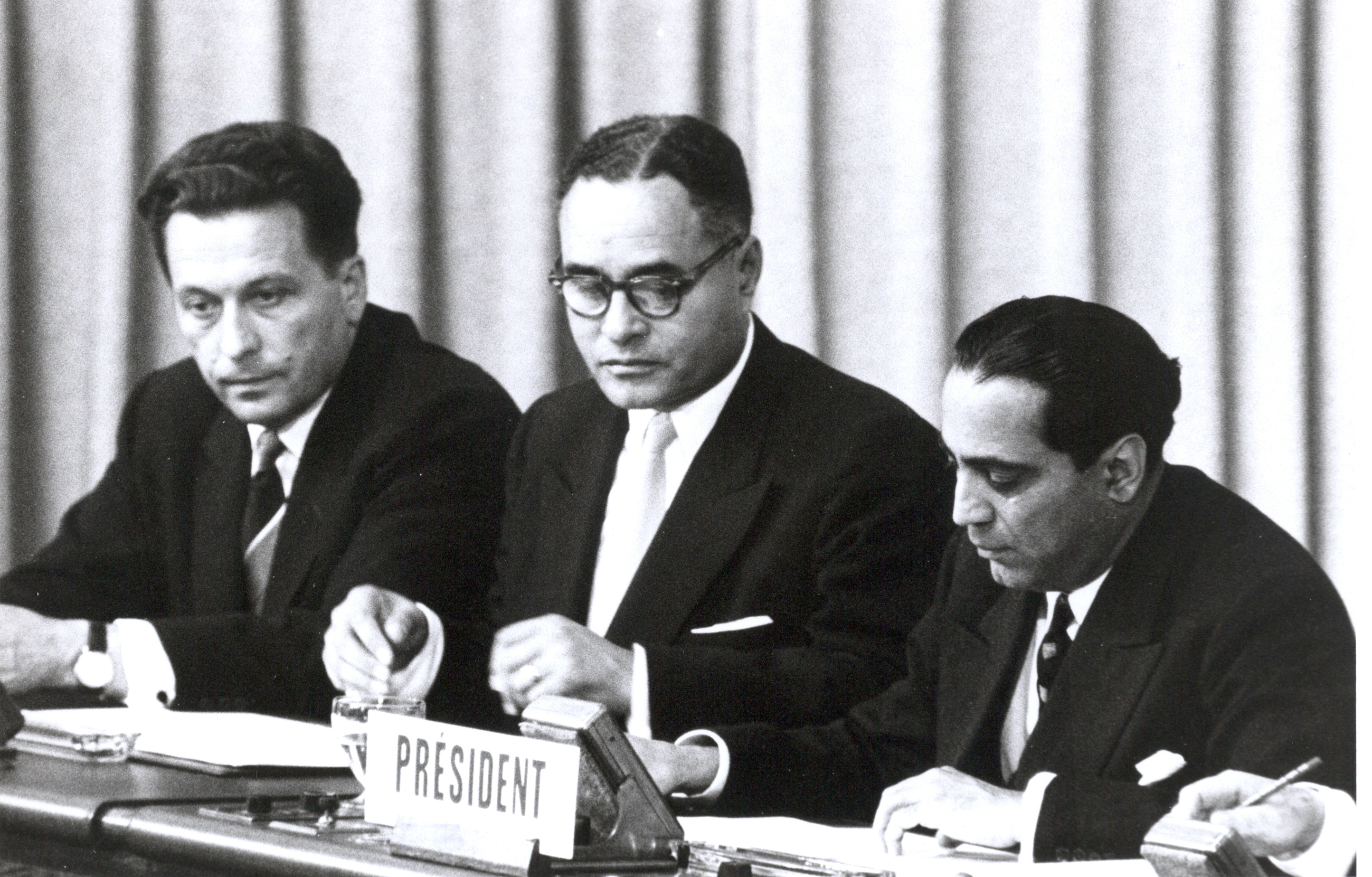
Bhabha (right) at the International Conference on the Peaceful Uses of Atomic Energy in Geneva, Switzerland, 20 August 1955

In the 1950s, Bhabha represented India in International Atomic Energy Agency conferences, and served as President of the United Nations Conference on the Peaceful Uses of Atomic Energy in Geneva, Switzerland in 1955.

According to the IAEA's 10 September 1956 draft statute, plutonium and other special fissionable materials would be deposited with the agency, which would have the discretion to provide states with quantities deemed suitable for nonmilitary use under safeguards. Bhabha successfully lobbied against the agency's broad authority, arguing in a 27 September 1956 conference that it was the "inalienable right of States to produce and hold the fissionable material required for the peaceful power programmes". The IAEA's final statute required only safeguards on fissile materials and reactors to ensure these weren't diverted to military use. Of Bhabha's negotiating skills, the US Atomic Energy Commission chairman Glenn Seaborg said: "He was not easy to argue with. Polite but very sure of himself, he was never at a loss for words, and was most articulate. He was a very imposing presence."

==== Allegations of developing nuclear explosives capability ====
Aware that the negotiated IAEA safeguards weren't sufficient to deter a state from developing weapons capability, Bhabha had remarked in his 27 September 1957 speech at the IAEA:

[T]here are many States, technically advanced, which may undertake with Agency aid, fulfilling all the present safeguards, but in addition run their own parallel programmes independently of the Agency in which they could use the experience and know-how obtained in Agency-aided projects, without being subject in any way to the system of safeguards.

In December 1959, in light of concerns about a possible Chinese nuclear weapons programme, Bhabha claimed to the Parliamentary Consultative Committee on Atomic Energy that India's nuclear energy research had progressed to the point where it could build nuclear weapons without external aid. In 1960, in a meeting with Nehru and Kenneth Nichols, who was visiting India as a consultant to Westinghouse, Bhabha estimated that it would take India "about a year" to build a nuclear bomb.

A 1964 US State Department Bureau of Intelligence and Research report concluded that although there was no "direct evidence" of an Indian nuclear weapons programme and that it was "unlikely" that India had made a decision to pursue weapons capability, it was "probably no accident" that "everything the Indians [had] done so far would be compatible with a weapons programme if at some future date it appeared desirable to start one".

A year after Bhabha's death, at a memorial lecture held in his honour, John Cockcroft stated that "it was a declared policy of the government of India not to develop nuclear weapons, and Homi Bhabha of course in his official pronouncements followed the policy of his government," but that Cockcroft "always thought, from private discussions, that his attitude was somewhat ambivalent. After the Chinese nuclear bomb test, he certainly wished to put India into the position of being able to make plutonium bombs, if the government so desired."

However, M. G. K. Menon, the new director of TIFR, pushed back against Cockcroft's statement, arguing that the motivation behind setting up the Indian plutonium reprocessing plant "has sometimes been misunderstood". He said that because the decision to build the plant was taken before the 1962 Indo-China war, it could not have been built for security reasons and was purely for reprocessing fuel rods. However, Menon conceded that mistrust between the two nations had been public since 1950. India also had knowledge of the Chinese nuclear weapons program before the 1962 war.

In a 2006 interview, P. K. Iyengar, a former chairman of the AEC, was asked whether Bhabha was "keen" on India becoming a nuclear weapons state. In response, Iyengar stated: "Dr Bhabha had in his mind from the very beginning that India should become a Nuclear Weapons State. His emphasis on self-reliance is essentially due to the fact he wanted India to be a nuclear weapons country."

==== Lobbying to build nuclear explosives ====
After the Chinese nuclear test on 16 October 1964, Bhabha began to publicly call for building nuclear explosives. On the other hand, Prime Minister Lal Bahadur Shastri, Nehru's successor, sought security guarantees from the existing nuclear powers, while declaring at the Cairo Conference of Non-aligned Nations that India's nuclear establishment was "under firm orders not to make a single experiment, not to perfect a single device which is not needed for peaceful uses of atomic energy".

On a visit to London on 4 October 1964, anticipating the Chinese test, Bhabha said that India could conduct a nuclear test within a year and a half of a decision to do so, but that he did not "think such a decision will be taken". A 28 October 1964 Indian Express survey found that public opinion leaders across India now took "for granted" Bhabha's claim that India could develop a nuclear bomb within a year and a half. Yet, this figure was likely an overestimate. In 1996, Raja Ramanna, the physicist tasked in 1965 with directing the nuclear weapons project, said: "I don't think it would have been possible to do what Bhabha said—build a device in 18 months. A crash program could have been done, I suppose, but it would have been very expensive." By 1965, Bhabha had updated his estimate from eighteen months to at least five years.

About a week after the Chinese test, Bhabha said in an All India Radio broadcast:

Atomic weapons give a State possessing them in adequate numbers a deterrent power against attack from a much stronger State. … A two megaton explosion, i.e., one equivalent to 2 million tons of TNT, would cost $600,000 or Rs. 30 lakhs. On the other hand, at current prices of TNT, 2 million tons of it would cost some Rs. 150 crores [$300 million].

This cost estimate ignored the expenses on reactors, reprocessing facilities and infrastructure necessary to design and produce weapons. Nevertheless, despite efforts by the US government and other Indian scientists to correct this estimate, Bhabha's arguments supporting the affordability of a nuclear weapons programme continued to be used by the Indian pro-bomb lobby. On 26 October 1964, the Hindu nationalist Jana Sangh editorialized: "We had the chance to do it [detonate a nuclear bomb] before China did it and so we could tell that we meant business and that we were ahead of China. In our criminal folly we missed it."

A 29 October 1964 US Embassy cable cited an informed source from the Indian Ministry of External Affairs as saying that "pressures within GOI [Government of India] for India to develop its own bomb were building up" and that "Bhabha was the leading advocate for this group and he was actively campaigning to go down nuclear the road". A six-hour cabinet discussion of nuclear policy had culminated in the Minister of External Affairs Swaran Singh and the influential Minister of Railways S. K. Patil supporting Bhabha, who was attending as an observer, in his proposal for a nuclear weapon-building program. Only two cabinet ministers were against. Prime Minister Lal Bahadur Shastri, Nehru's successor, authorized Bhabha to "come up with estimate of what was involved in India's attempting an underground 'explosion'."

This repudiated Shastri's policy preferences, who, as a Gandhian, showed a strong moral revulsion to building nuclear weapons, and did not wish to increase defence spending during the nation's ongoing food crisis. Shastri sought British assistance in making more objective cost estimates. In a November 1964 All India Congress Committee meeting, he disputed Bhabha's numbers, arguing that the production of a single nuclear bomb would cost Rs 400 to 500 million, more than two hundred times Bhabha's estimate. In a remark likely aimed at Bhabha's All India Radio broadcast, Shastri added that "scientists should realise that it was the responsibility of the Government to defend the country and adopt appropriate measures". Beyond economic considerations, he warned that with the development of an initial weapons capability, India "could not be content with one or two bombs. The spirit of competition was bound to capture her". As "the majority of speakers [had come] out strongly and frankly in favour of India manufacturing atom bombs" at the meeting, the Hindustan Times called Shastri's successful opposing address "nothing short of a miracle". After Shastri's address, Bhabha clarified that his figures came from an American study on "the peaceful uses of atomic explosions" for civil engineering projects, but maintained that nuclear explosive power could be cost-effective.

On 23 and 24 November 1964, when the Lok Sabha met to discuss India's foreign policy, speakers generally assumed that Bhabha's eighteen-month timeline for building a nuclear bomb was accurate, and did not suggest that a Soviet or US nuclear umbrella would extend over India in case of a nuclear attack. Ultimately, in part due to uncertainty around the cost of developing a nuclear bomb and its appropriate delivery platforms, the Parliament deferred a decision for or against nuclear weapons. The parliamentarians moved instead to speed the development of technology and know-how which would enable them to establish a nuclear weapons programme if they later decided to do so. Shastri hedged, though, that this policy was subject to change:

I cannot say that the present policy is deep-rooted, that it cannot be set aside, that it can never be changed. … Here situations alter, changes take place, and we have to mould our policies accordingly. If there is a need to amend what we have said today, then we will say—all right, let us go ahead and do so.

Historians have argued that this marked the beginning of India's policy of keeping a "nuclear option". On 27 November 1964, the Jana Sangh introduced a motion in the Lok Sabha calling for the development of nuclear weapons. Shastri, reiterating his moral stand for nuclear disarmament, won a voice vote against the motion. However, he reminded the Parliament that the manufacture of nuclear weapons could be completed in "two or three years" if necessary. Then, for the first time, he said that India's work on nuclear energy for nonmilitary use would include the development of peaceful nuclear explosives, which he called "nuclear devices":

Dr. Bhabha has made it quite clear to me that as far as we can progress and improve upon nuclear devices, we should do so, as far as development is possible, we should resort to it so that we can reap its peaceful benefits and we can use it for the development of our nation. … Just assume that we have to use big tunnels and we have to clear huge areas, we have to wipe out mountains for development parks, and in this context if it is required to use nuclear devices for the good of the country as well as for the good of the world, so then our Atomic Energy Commission is pursuing these same objectives.

Shastri's announcement of a program to develop peaceful nuclear explosives fell short of sanctioning an explicit nuclear weapons programme. However, though intended for different purposes, the two kinds of devices are technically similar. Speaking to the Press Trust of India in 1997, Raja Ramanna said:

The Pokhran test was a bomb, I can tell you now. … An explosion is an explosion, a gun is a gun, whether you shoot at someone or shoot at the ground. … I just want to make clear that the test was not all that peaceful.

Ramanna speculated that the Shastri endorsement of peaceful nuclear explosive research "must have come from Bhabha". In an interview with the scholar George Perkovich in 1997, Homi Sethna, a former AEC chairman, agreed that Bhabha had prompted this statement, though he added that "Bhabha was able to obtain approval to do theoretical studies only". Historians have interpreted the shift in Shastri's no-bomb position as a concession to the pro-bomb officials within the Congress party and an attempt to win Bhabha's support, which could shield Shastri against further attacks on nuclear policy in the Parliament. The new nuclear policy of doing theoretical research on peaceful nuclear explosives also avoided the large economic costs and international recriminations that would follow a full-fledged nuclear weapons programme.

The concession apparently did win Bhabha's alignment. After the 1965 Indo-Pakistani war, pressure to build nuclear weapons intensified as the threat from Pakistan introduced new security concerns. Rather than using the renewed political debate to gain additional authorizations, Bhabha denied in an interview that he had received any new instructions from Shastri, saying: "The emergency changed nothing. Why should it?" Historians have interpreted Bhabha's comments as an indication that the constraint to building nuclear explosives was not policy, but unmet technological requirements.

After realizing that the eighteen-month timeline for building nuclear weapons capability was too ambitious, Bhabha held several meetings with US officials in secret between 1964 and 1965. In these, he explored the option of importing nuclear explosive capability, especially fissile plutonium and designs of a nuclear device, from the US Atomic Energy Commission as part of Project Plowshare. However, with the emergence of the Nuclear Nonproliferation Treaty, this option eventually closed. After Bhabha's death, dissatisfied with the NPT's refusal to meet India's security concerns, scientists at the Bhabha Atomic Research Centre and the Defence Research and Development Organization began work on the nuclear device used in the 1974 Pokhran test.

== Interest in and patronage of the arts ==
A classical music and opera enthusiast, Bhabha pushed for Vienna to be the headquarters of the IAEA in part to be able to attend the state opera when attending IAEA meetings. According to his brother Jamshed Bhabha,

For Homi Bhabha, the arts were not just a form of recreation or pleasant relaxation; they were among the most serious pursuits of life and he attached just as much importance to them as to his work in mathematics and physics. For him, the arts were, in his own words, 'what made life worth living'.

Bhabha was an avid painter, decorating his house with abstracts he painted during the 1930s in England.Homi Bhabha was also a patron of Pablo Picasso's works and repeatedly invited him to visit India. He was a key patron of the Progressive Artists’ Group, formed in Bombay in 1947 to establish new ways of expressing India's post-colonial identity. This group produced artists like F. N. Souza, M. F. Husain, Tyeb Mehta, K. H. Ara and S. H. Raza, some of whose early works Bhabha selected for the TIFR collection. Unique among scientific institutions around the world, TIFR still hosts a large collection of contemporary Indian art, which was opened to the public in 2018.

== Awards and honours ==
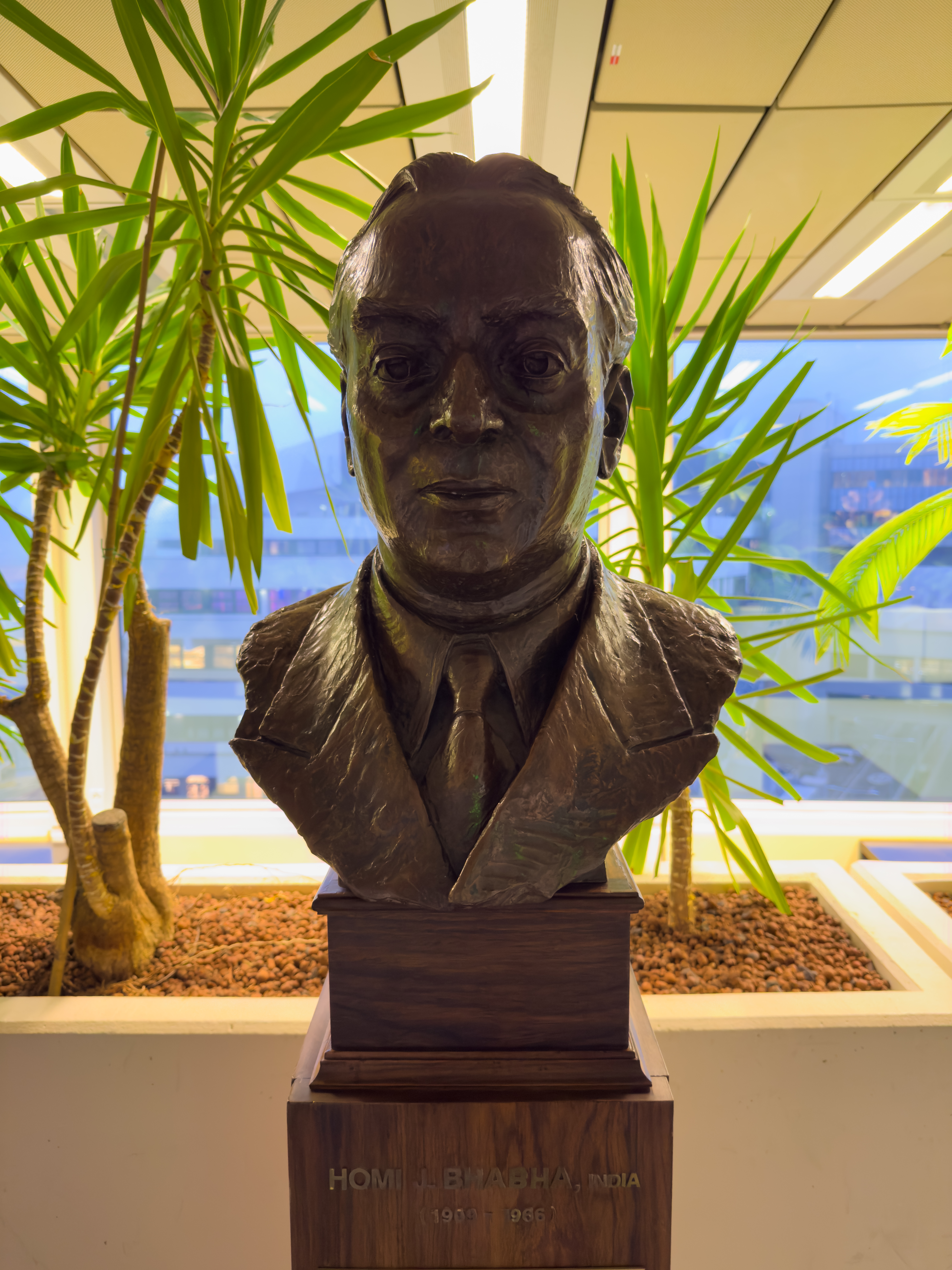
Bust at the UN Vienna International Centre

Bhabha's doctoral thesis won him the Adams Prize in 1942, making him the first Indian to receive the honour. This was followed by a Hopkins Prize by the Cambridge Philosophical Society in 1948.

He gained international prominence after deriving a correct expression for the probability of scattering positrons by electrons, a process now known as Bhabha scattering. His major contributions included work on Compton scattering, R-process, and the advancement of nuclear physics. He was nominated for the Nobel Prize for Physics in 1951 and 1953–1956.

He was awarded Padma Bhushan, India's third-highest civilian honour, in 1954. In 1957, he was elected an honorary fellow of Gonville and Caius College and of the Royal Society of Edinburgh. He was elected a Foreign Honorary Fellow of the American Academy of Arts and Sciences in 1958, and appointed the President of the International Union of Pure and Applied Physics from 1960 to 1963. Bhabha received several honorary doctoral degrees in science throughout his career: Patna (1944), Lucknow (1949), Banaras (1950), Agra (1952), Perth (1954), Allahabad (1958), Cambridge (1959), London (1960) and Padova (1961).

== Death ==
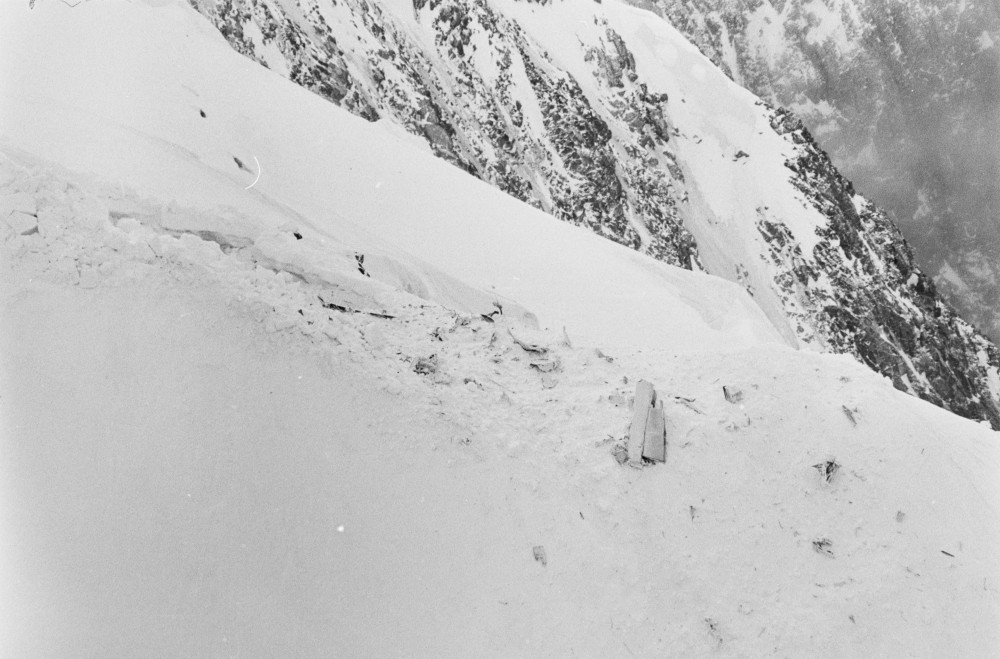
Air India Flight 101 crash site

On 24 January 1966, Bhabha was on board Air India Flight 101, a Boeing 707-420, when it crashed near Mont Blanc in a controlled flight into terrain while trying to land at Geneva Airport. All 106 passengers, including Bhabha, and 11 crew members died in the crash. A misunderstanding between Geneva Airport ATC and the pilots about the aircraft position near the mountain was noted to be the official reason for the crash.

In a ceremony mourning his death, then Prime Minister Indira Gandhi quoted:

To lose Dr Homi Bhabha at this crucial moment in the development of our atomic energy programme is a terrible blow for our nation. He had his most creative years ahead of him. When we take up the unfinished work he has left behind, we will realize in how many fields he served us. For me, it is a personal loss. I shall miss his wide-ranging mind and many talents, his determination to strengthen our country’s science and enthusiastic interest in life’s many facets. We mourn a great son of India.

=== Assassination claims ===
Many possible theories have been advanced for the air crash, including a claim that the Central Intelligence Agency (CIA) was involved in paralysing India's nuclear program. An Indian diplomatic bag containing calendars and a personal letter was recovered near the crash site in 2012.

Gregory Douglas, a journalist, conspiracy theorist, forger, and holocaust denier who claimed to have conducted telephone conversations with former CIA operative Robert Crowley in 1993, published a book titled Conversations with the Crow in 2013. According to Douglas, Crowley claimed that the CIA was responsible for assassinating Homi Bhabha and Prime Minister Shastri in 1966, thirteen days apart, to thwart India's nuclear programme. Douglas asserted that Crowley told him a bomb in the cargo section of the plane exploded mid-air, bringing down the commercial Boeing 707 airliner in Alps with few traces. Per Douglas, Crowley said: "We could have blown it up over Vienna but we decided the high mountains were much better for the bits and pieces to come down on". Conspiracy theorists point to the circumstances surrounding the death of Vikram Sarabhai, who showed no signs of illness prior to his death from a heart attack and was cremated without autopsy, as additional evidence of foreign involvement.

== Legacy ==
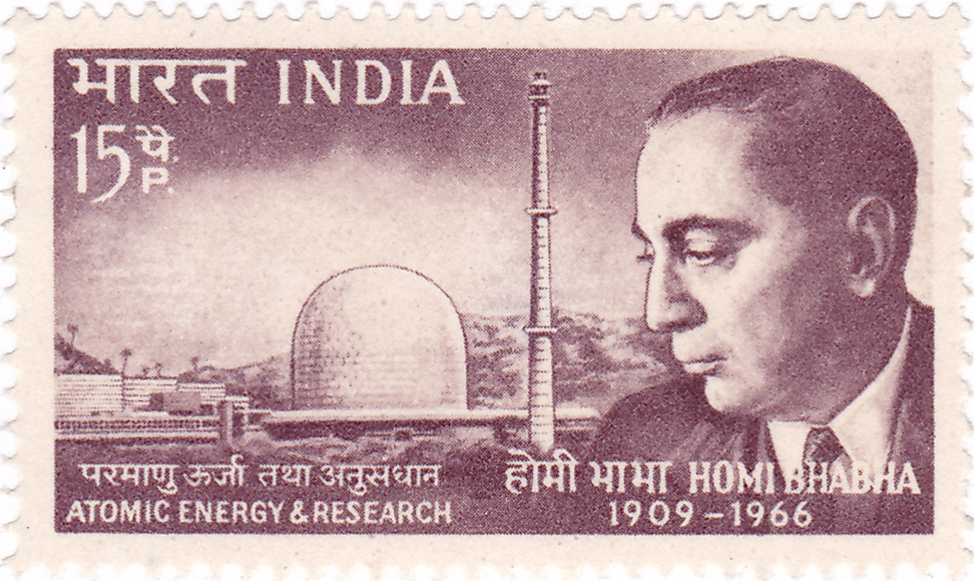
Bhabha on a 1966 stamp of India

Bhabha is considered the "father of the Indian nuclear programme" and one of the most prominent scientists in the country's history. After his death, the Atomic Energy Establishment at Mumbai was renamed the Bhabha Atomic Research Centre in his honour. In 1967, TIFR showcased an exhibition of Bhabha's life at the Royal Society, which was later moved to TIFR's auditorium foyer. The auditorium was named the Homi Bhabha Auditorium in the late scientist's honour and inaugurated by Prime Minister Indira Gandhi on 9 November 1968.

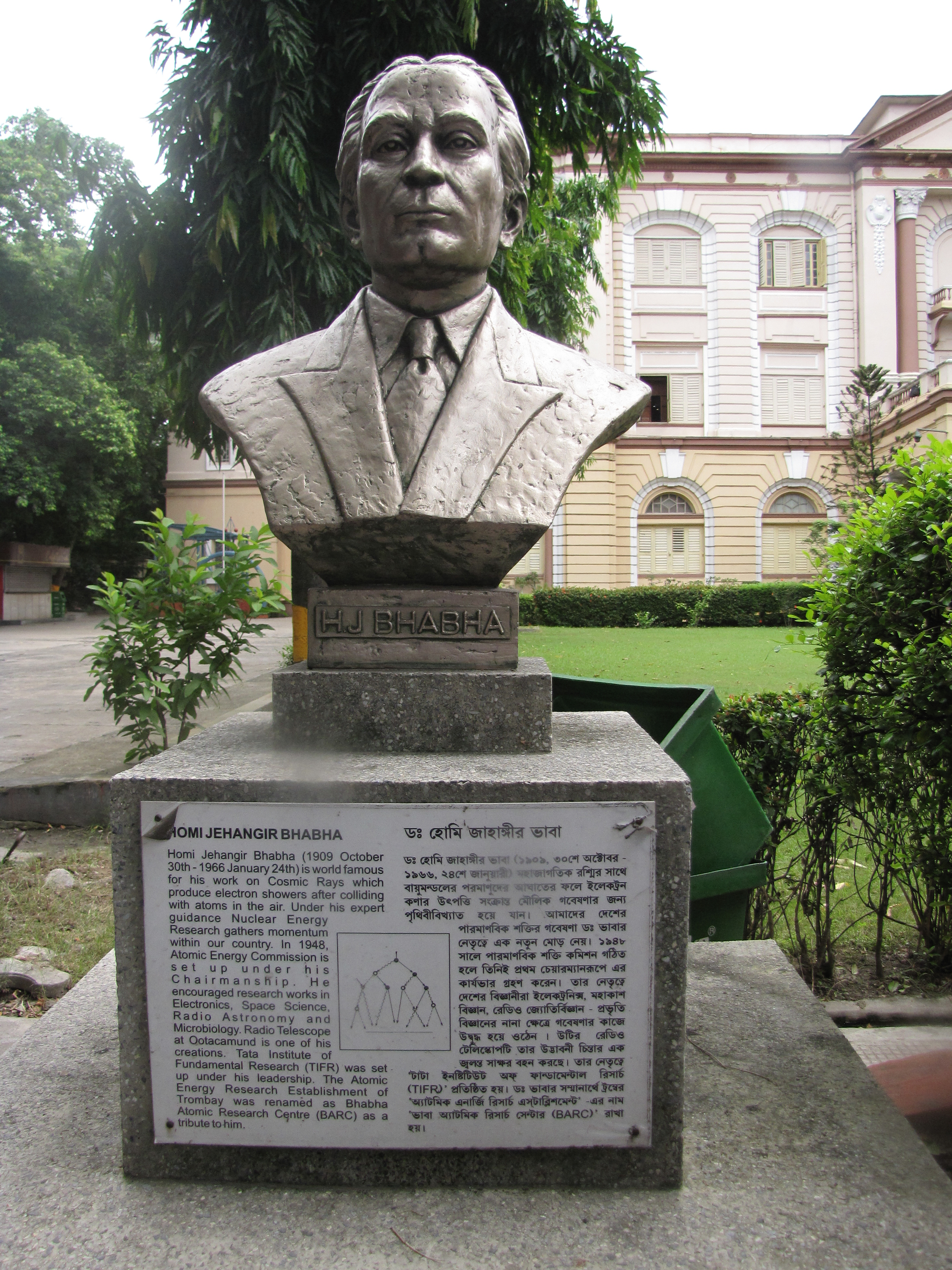
Bust of Bhabha at Birla Industrial & Technological Museum, Kolkata

Bhabha encouraged research in electronics, space science, microbiology and radio astronomy. The radio telescope in Ooty, India, which is one of the world's largest steerable telescopes, was built at Bhabha's initiative in 1970. A number of research institutes received their initial funding from the Department of Atomic Energy under Bhabha's supervision, including the Tata Memorial Hospital, the Indian Cancer Research Centre, the Saha Institute of Nuclear Physics and the Physical Research Laboratory in Ahmedabad. As a member of the Indian Cabinet's Scientific Advisory Committee to the Cabinet, Bhabha played a key role in helping Vikram Sarabhai set up the Indian National Committee for Space Research.

The Homi Bhabha Fellowship Council has been giving Homi Bhabha Fellowships since 1967. Other noted institutions in his name are the Homi Bhabha National Institute, an Indian-deemed university and the Homi Bhabha Centre for Science Education, Mumbai, India.

At Bhabha death, his estate, including Mehrangir, the sprawling colonial bungalow at Malabar Hill where he spent most of his life, was inherited by his brother Jamshed Bhabha. Jamshed, an avid patron of arts and culture, bequeathed the bungalow and its contents to the National Centre for the Performing Arts, which auctioned the property for Rs 372 crores in 2014 to raise funds for upkeep and development of the centre. The bungalow was demolished in June 2016 by the owner, Smita-Crishna Godrej of the Godrej family, despite some efforts to have it preserved as a memorial to Homi Bhabha.

== In popular culture ==
Rocket Boys (2022) is a web series inspired by the lives of Homi J. Bhabha, Vikram Sarabhai and A. P. J. Abdul Kalam, in which Bhabha is played by Jim Sarbh. In 2023, the second season was released.

Saare Jahan Se Accha (2025) is an Indian spy thriller web series starring Pratik Gandhi which takes the death of Bhabha in the initial plot development and shows it as a reason for the formation of R&AW.

== See also ==
- Abdul Qadeer Khan – Pakistani nuclear physicist (1936–2021)
- Bertrand Goldschmidt – French chemist (1912–2002)
- Deng Jiaxian – Chinese nuclear physicist (1924–1986)
- Homi Bhabha Medal and Prize – Physics award
- Igor Kurchatov – Soviet nuclear physicist (1903–1960)
- India's three-stage nuclear power programme – India's nuclear energy programme envisioned by Homi J. Bhabha
- J. Robert Oppenheimer – American theoretical physicist (1904–1967)
- John von Neumann – Hungarian and American mathematician and physicist (1903–1957)
- Leo Szilard – Hungarian-American physicist and inventor (1898–1964)
- William Penney, Baron Penney – English mathematician and physicist (1909–1991)

== Sources ==
- Nath, Biman (2022). Homi J Bhabha: A Renaissance Man among Scientists. Niyogi Books. ISBN 9789391125110.
- Chowdhury, Indira; Dasgupta, Ananya (2010). A masterful spirit : Homi J. Bhabha, 1909-1966. New Delhi: Penguin Books. ISBN 978-0-14-306672-9. OCLC 680165938.
- Deśamukha, Cintāmaṇī.; National Book Trust (2003). Homi Jehangir Bhabha. New Delhi: National Book Trust. ISBN 81-237-4106-5. OCLC 55680312.
- Perkovich, George (1999). India's nuclear bomb : the impact on global proliferation. Berkeley: University of California Press. ISBN 0-520-21772-1. OCLC 41612482.
