= Noonmati railway station =

Railway station in Assam, India

Noonmati

General information
- Location: Mani Ram Dewan Road, Noonmati, Guwahati, Kamrup Metropolitan district, Assam; India
- Coordinates: 26°10′49″N 91°48′25″E
- Elevation: 61 m (200 ft)
- System: Indian Railways station
- Owner: Indian Railways
- Operator: Northeast Frontier Railway
- Line: Guwahati–Lumding section
- Platforms: 1

Construction
- Structure type: Standard (on-ground station)

Other information
- Status: Operational
- Station code: NMY
- Zone(s): Northeast Frontier Railway
- Division(s): Lumding

History
- Electrified: Double Electric line
- Former names: Assam Bengal Railway

Services
Preceding station	Indian Railways	Following station
New Guwahati towards Guwahati	Northeast Frontier Railway zone Guwahati–Lumding section	Narangi towards Lumding
Location
- Location within Assam Location within India

Noonmati railway station is a railway station located on the Guwahati–Lumding railway line operated by the Northeast Frontier Railway zone under Lumding railway division. It is situated beside Mani Ram Dewan Road at Noonmati, Guwahati in Kamrup Metropolitan district, in the Indian state of Assam.
