= Calcutta Stock Exchange =

Stock exchange located in Kolkata

- Type: Stock Exchange
- Location: Kolkata, India
- Founded: 1 December 1908; 117 years ago
- Owner: The Calcutta Stock Exchange Limited
- Key people: Dr Bhaskar Banerjee (Chairman); Sri Subrato Das Managing Director & Chief Executive Officer
- Currency: Indian rupee (₹)
- No. of listings: Approximately 2,700
- Market cap: ₹57,750,020,000 (US$600 million) (2019-20)
- Indices: CSE 40
- Website: www.cse-india.com

Calcutta Stock Exchange (CSE) was an Indian stock exchange based in Kolkata, India. It is owned by Ministry of Finance, Government of India. It is one of oldest stock exchanges in Asia and third largest bourse in India. It was founded in May 1908 at 2, China Bazar Street.

The Calcutta Stock Exchange has been asked to exit by SEBI, but the matter is sub judice before the Calcutta High Court; thirteen other regional stock exchanges have closed in the last three years under SEBI's exit policy, including the Bangalore Stock Exchange, the Hyderabad Stock Exchange and the Madras Stock Exchange. Since 2013, there has been no trading on the CSE trading platform.

== History and timeline ==
In 1830, bourse activities in Kolkata were conducted under a neem tree. The earliest record of dealings in securities in India records trading of the British East India Company’s loan stock. The exchange was founded on 1 December 1863 by sixteen leading stockbrokers, beginning life in rented premises on 11 Strand Road. The premises also had a library, open to the public, which could be accessed after paying an admission fee. In 1908, the stock exchange was reconstituted in its current form, and had 150 members. The present building at the Lyons Range was constructed in 1928. The Calcutta Stock Exchange Ltd was granted permanent recognition by the Government of India with effect from 14 April 1980, under the relevant provisions of the Securities Contracts (Regulation) Act, 1956. The Calcutta Stock Exchange followed the open outcry system for stock trading until 1997, when it was replaced by C-STAR (CSE Screen Based Trading And Reporting), an electronic trading platform.

In 2001, the CSE experienced significant damage after the exposure of stock manipulation done by Ketan Parekh. Parekh and his associates rigged the prices of the stocks that were listed on CSE.

The Bombay Stock Exchange (BSE) had made a strategic investment in the Calcutta Stock Exchange by acquiring 5% of its shares in 2007.

In 2013, the CSE was suspended by SEBI after it failed to comply with the regulatory norms. The suspension was upheld by the Calcutta High Court. During the annual budget of fiscal year 2026–27, the Government of West Bengal has proposed the revival of the CSE.

== See also ==
- List of South Asian stock exchanges
- List of stock exchanges in the Commonwealth of Nations
