= TIFRAC =

Computer developed in India

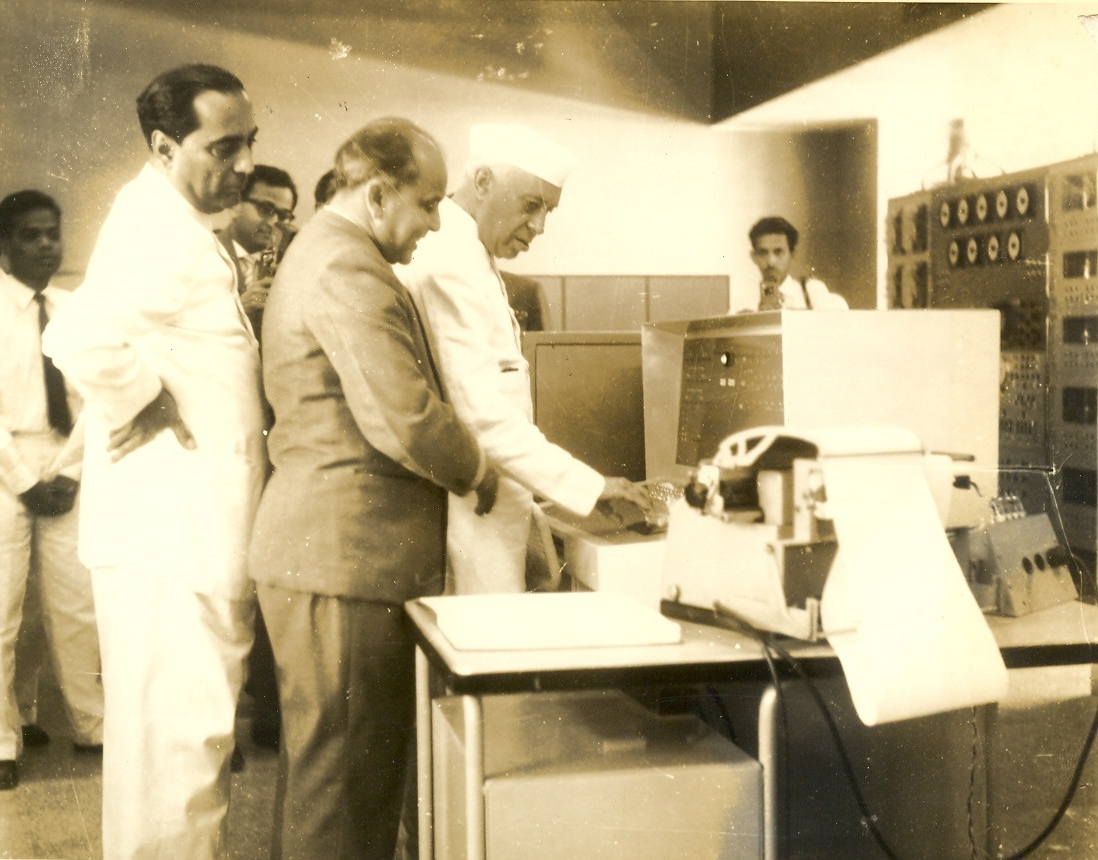
Professor Rangaswamy Narasimhan demonstrating the first Indian digital computer to Jawaharlal Nehru and Homi J. Bhabha at Tata Institute of Fundamental Research

TIFRAC (Tata Institute of Fundamental Research Automatic Calculator) was the first computer developed in India, at the Tata Institute of Fundamental Research in Mumbai. Initially a TIFR Pilot Machine was developed in the 1950s (operational in 1956). Based on the IAS machine design, the development of the final machine was started in 1955 and was formally commissioned (and named TIFRAC, by Jawaharlal Nehru) in 1960. The full machine was in use until 1965.

TIFRAC included 2,700 vacuum tubes, 1,700 germanium diodes and 12,500 resistors. It had 2,048 40-bit words of ferrite core memory. This machine was an early adopter of ferrite core memory.

The main assembly of TIFRAC, which had vacuum tubes was housed in a massive steel rack measuring 18 feet x 2.5 feet x 8 feet. It was fabricated from modules of 4 feet x 2.5 feet x 8 feet. Each module had steel doors on either side for accessing the circuits.

A cathode-ray tube display system was developed to serve as an auxiliary output to the computer for analogue and digital display of both graphs and alpha-numeric symbols.

A manual console served as the input/output control unit of the computer. The software of TIFRAC were written in a series of commands of 0s and 1s (machine code).

A British-built HEC 2M computer, happened to be the first digital computer in India, which was imported and installed in Indian Statistical Institute, Kolkata, during 1955. Prior to that, this institute had developed a small analog computer in 1953, which is technically the first computer in India.

== See also ==
- List of vacuum tube computers
