= Computer Society of India =

Indian professional body

- Nickname: CSI
- Established: 6 March 1965
- Location: Mumbai, India
- President: Election process going on
- Website: https://csiindia.org/ https://csi-india.org/

Computer Society of India is a body of computer professionals in India. It was started on 6 March 1965 by a few computer professionals and has now grown to be the national body representing computer professionals. It has 72 chapters across India, 511 student branches, and 100,000 members.

The Computer Society of India is a non-profit professional meet to exchange views and information to learn and share ideas. The wide spectrum of members is committed to the advancement of theory and practice of Computer Engineering and Technology Systems, Science and Engineering, Information Processing and related Arts and Sciences.

The Society also encourages and assists professionals to maintain integrity and competence of the profession and fosters a sense of partnership amongst members. Besides the activities held at the Chapters and Student Branches, the Society also conducts periodic conferences, seminars.

Through the initiatives of Professor Rangaswamy Narasimhan the first President, CSI has been in close liaison with International Federation for Information Processing (IFIP) since its inception in 1965, when observers from India attended the IFIP Council meeting. Since 1974, when CSI became a member of IFIP, CSI has organized many IFIP sponsored events and was host to the 1978 Council meeting in Bombay and 1988 General Assembly in New Delhi. It represents India in technical committees and working groups of IFIP. Prof. Vipin Tyagi, Jaypee University of Engineering and Technology is Hon. Secretary of Computer Society of India.

== Organization ==
The Society functions under the guidance of an Executive Committee. The members of this Committee are elected by voting members of the Society. The Functional head of the Society is the President and is assisted by the Vice President, Secretary and Treasurer.

== Membership ==
The Society is targeted at the IT professionals and also user community at large. Hence, the membership of the Society is open to all professionals involved in the field of information technology. The membership categories include individual and institutional. In the individual member category there are five grades namely Fellow, Senior, Member, Associate and Student, whereas institutional membership includes organisations and educational institutions. A professional can also apply for life membership in the society.

== Education Directorate ==
CSI started conducting the National Standard Test for Programming Competence in 1975. A Directorate of Education was set up in 1985, and a number of modules, such as Systems Analysis and Design, Data Communication, OS, and DBMS, are covered, in order to ensure a minimum level of professional competence, especially amongst those without a university background.

CSI has an Educational Directorate which undertakes activities related to certification of professionals related to the latest technologies. Its recent initiative of distance education in the Business Domain areas offers technology enabled learning supported by personal counselling & expert advice. The Education Directorate is headed by a full-time academician who along with Chairman of Division V (Education & Research) and the National Student Coordinator collectively provides necessary guidance and directions to the member academic institutions and students community.

The Education Directorate organizes continuing education and professional development programmes. It also extends finance assistance to research projects undertaken by faculty and postgraduate students. Student professional development activities have been encouraged through the student branches as well as student-paper contests at the Annual Conventions.

== Special Interest Groups (SIGs) ==
Computer Society of India (CSI), has implemented the concept of “Special Interest Groups” to promote activities and research in dew focused areas. Various Special Interest Groups have been formed accordingly.

Special Interest Group on Start-ups for Digital India : Core objective is to focus on creating and nurturing the start-up ecosystem in India. Prime Minister of India Shri Narendra Modi has laid emphasis on development of start-up ecosystem as one of his corner stone for the development of youth and entrepreneurship in India. This SIG provides help, support and organizes events on its own and with member institutes and other ministries to promote start-up formation, legal, financials, technical and marketings issues etc. Mr. Anuj Agarwal is the National Convener of this group.

Special Interest Group on Artificial Intelligence (SIGAI) : Initiatives of SIGAI include various national and international journals, conferences and workshops. Central objectives of Special Interest Group on Artificial Intelligence (SIGAI) include,

- To provide a national forum for interaction among Indian Artificial Intelligence community
- To act as an interface to other national AI forums and international bodies and initiatives
- To promote research and practical applications of AI in academia and industry

Members of SIGAI have played a key role in organizing the International Joint Conference in Artificial Intelligence (IJCAI - 07), the premier AI conference in the world held at Hyderabad from 6 to 12 January 2007.

Special Interest Group on eGovernance : Core objective is to focus on important areas where Information Technology can be leveraged and bring like-minded professionals together to add value by bringing out recommendations relevant to various stakeholders.

Special Interest Group on Free and Open Source Software (CSI-SIG-FOSS) : One of the earliest SIGs, the SIG-FOSS has been carrying out several activities across the country in promoting the use of FOSS. In 2009, the SIG organized SciPy 2009 in collaboration with IIT-Bombay, and in 2010, conducted two major events: the National Seminar on FOSS in Education, hosted by NIT Calicut, together with IIIT Hyderabad. SIG also supported the FOSSK4 Conference at Trivandrum during 27-29 Dec 2011.

== Publications ==
Computer Society of India brings out three national publications namely CSI Journal of Computing, CSI Communications and CSI Adhyayan.

CSI Journal of Computing is a quarterly, which contains rigorously reviewed articles and original research papers in the field of theoretical interest, case studies of successful applications of national relevance, and reviews of books and journals.

CSI Communications is a monthly theme based national publication covering technical articles of current interests and reports of conferences, symposia, and seminars.
