= Vardhman Group of Companies =

Indian conglomerate

Vardhman Logo

Vardhman Group is a textile group based in Ludhiana, Punjab, India, that was established in 1965. The group is engaged in manufacturing and trading in Yarn and Processed Fabric, Sewing Thread, Acrylic fibre and Alloy steel. Vardhman group was incorporated in 1962 as Vardhman Spinning & General Mills (VSGML). The company was promoted by VS Oswal and RC Oswal initially and is now headed by S. P. Oswal Jain. The total number of employees in the company as of April 2011 is 23,000.

== Group companies ==
The group is structured in such a way as to have a central holding company that is used for investing in the different group companies. The holding company in this case is Vardhman Holdings limited and the group companies are Vardhman Textiles (61%), Vardhman Industries (65%) and Vardhman Acrylic (60%). Vardhman textiles in-turn has holding in VMT Spinning (73.33%), Vardhman threads (100%) and Vardhman yarns and threads (11%).

== Products ==
Some of the important products of Vardhman group are: simple and blended yarns, acrylic fibre (brand Varlon), range of threads (apparel sewing, tea bags, industrial threads, etc.), shirting and trouser materials, forging and automotive components and steel.

== Export history ==
The company started exporting from 1990–91 and it exports mainly to Spain, UK, Germany, US, Japan and some African and E.Asian countries. Exports account for 22% of the group's revenues.

== Analysis ==
Strategic analysis: 1. The group has a unique business model with presence in entire value chain from Fibre to Fabric this gives it the company the flexibility to reorganize their business effectively during down turns and ramp up faster than competitors when the economy is buoyant. 2. The group has a large cotton inventory holding capacity thus helping it to control its supply chain operations and thereby absorb fluctuations in market demand. 3. In order to build a competitive advantage, the group has been continuously working on improving its capabilities continuously and diversifying from its core Yarn and fabric business. The groups foray into Steel is a good example of this.

Financial analysis: 1. Sales growth - An analysis of the gross sales of the company between 2004-2009 shows that sales of the company is growing at an CAGR of 9.5% 2. Sales Vs Profit Growth - Analyzing the gross sales and PBT ratio, while the sales is growing at 9.5% CAGR the PBT is decreasing from 11.5% in 2005-2006 to 4.3% in 2008-2009. If the businesses are ranked in terms of profitability the order would be as follows: Yarn, Thread, Steel and Fabric.

== CSR initiatives ==
The group has been active in multiple educational and general wellness initiatives. Some examples are given below: 1. Setting up Sri Aurobindo socio-economic and management research institute, setting up commerce and management colleges and schools 2. Active participant of Village Culture Adaptation program at Punjab to increase the cotton yield per hectare and the program was a huge success. Started similar village adaptation program in MP and till now 2 villages have been adopted.
