= Hyderabad Stock Exchange =

Former stock exchange in Hyderabad, India

Hyderabad Stock Exchange (HSE) was a stock exchange established in 1941 located in Hyderabad, India. The exchange was disbanded in 2007 by SEBI and since January 2013, HSE was conditionally permitted to function as regular broking or corporate entity.

== History ==
In November 1941, some leading bankers and brokers formed the share and stock Brokers Association. In 1942, Mr. Gulab Mohammed, the Finance Minister, formed a committee for the purpose of constituting rules and regulations of the Stock Exchange. Sri Purushothamdas Thakurdas, president and founding member of the Hyderabad Stock Exchange performed the opening ceremony of the exchange on 14 November 1943 under Hyderabad Companies Act. Mr. Kamal Yar Jung Bahadur was the first president of the exchange. The HSE started functioning under Hyderabad Securities Contract Act of No. 21 of 1352 under H.E.H. Nizam’s government as a company limited by guarantee. It was the 6th Stock Exchange recognized under Securities Contract Act, after the Premier Stock Exchanges, Ahmedabad, Bombay, Calcutta, Madras, and Bangalore Stock Exchange. All deliveries were completed every Monday or the next working day.

The HSE was first recognized by the Government of India on 29 September 1958 as Securities Regulation Act was made applicable to twin cities of Hyderabad and Secunderabad from that date. In view of substantial growth in trading activities, and for the yeoman services rendered by the exchange, the exchange was bestowed with permanent recognition with effect from 29 September 1983.

=== Operations ===
The Hyderabad Stock Exchange Ltd. began its operations in a small way in a rented building in the Koti, Hyderabad area. It moved to Aiyangar Plaza, Bank Street in 1987. In September 1989, the then Vice-President of India, Shankar Dayal Sharma inaugurated the Stock Exchange's own building at Himayatnagar, Hyderabad. Later, in order to bring all the trading members under one roof, the exchange acquired still larger premises situated at 6-3-654/A; Somajiguda, Hyderabad - 82, with a six storied building and a constructed area of about 486,842 square feet (45,229.1 m^{2}) (including cellar of 70,857 square feet (6,582.8 m^{2})).

== Derecognition of Stock Exchange ==
Securities and Exchange Board of India (SEBI) had notified The Hyderabad Stock Exchange Ltd. (Corporatisation and Demutualisation) Scheme, 2005 on 29 August 2005. The Hyderabad Stock Exchange Ltd. has failed to dilute 51% of its equity share capital to the public other than shareholders having trading rights on or before 28 August 2007. Consequently, in terms of section 5(2) of the Securities Contracts Regulation Act, 1956 (SCRA), the recognition granted to HSE was withdrawn with effect from 29 August 2007. After derecognization by SEBI, the company name has been changed to "Hyderabad Securities and Equities Ltd."

The number of members of the Exchange was 55 in 1943, 117 in 1993 and increased to 300 with 869 listed companies having paid up capital of Rs.19128.85s of 31 March 2000. The business turnover also substantially increased to Rs. 1236.51 crores in 1999-2000. The Exchange had a very smooth settlement system.

== See also ==
- List of South Asian stock exchanges
- List of stock exchanges in the Commonwealth of Nations
