= Guwahati City Centre Mall =

Shopping mall in Guwahati, India

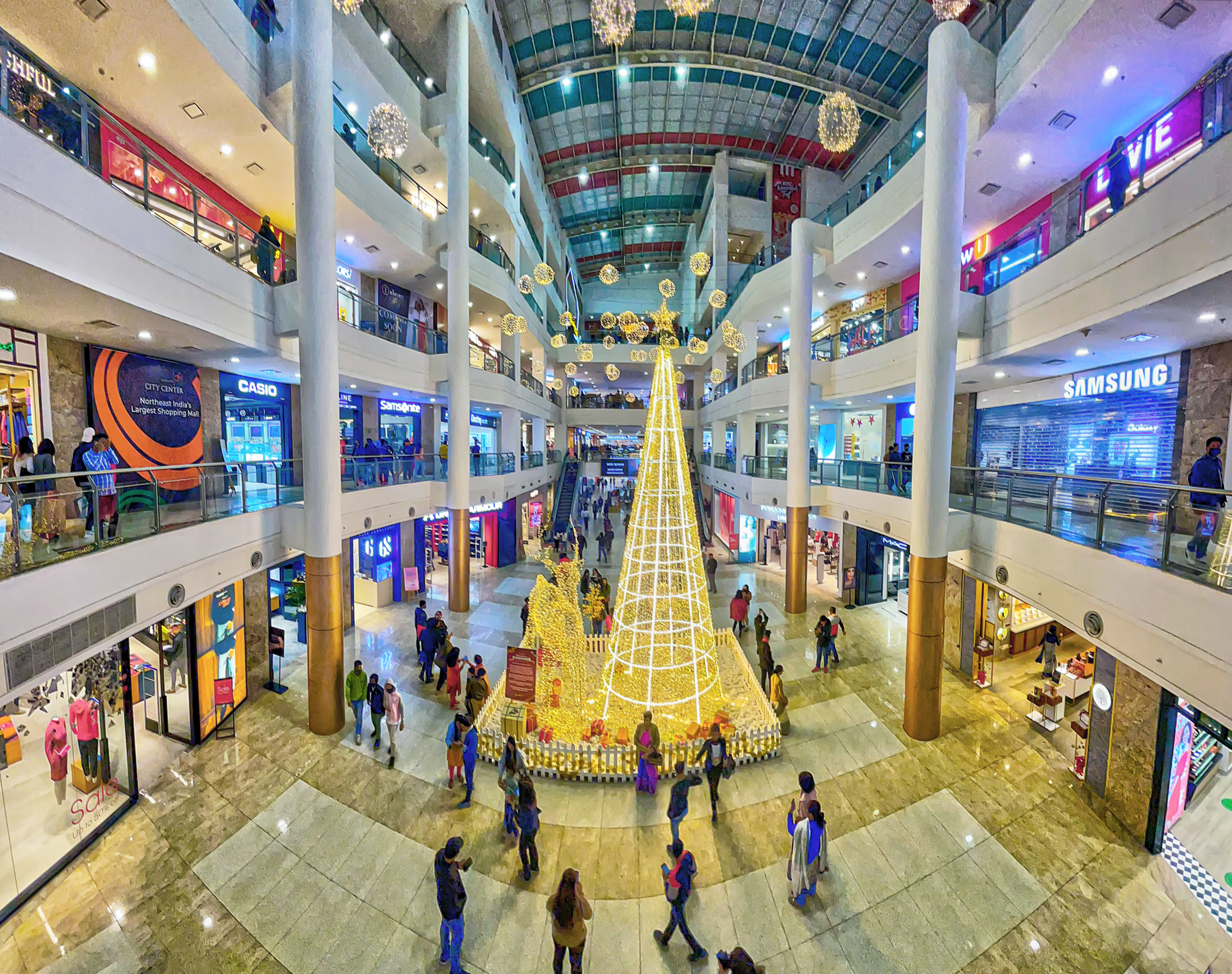
- Guwahati City Centre Mall interior
- Coordinates: 26.155°N 91.782°E
- Address: G.S. Road, Christian Basti, Guwahati
- Opened: 1 April 2018; 8 years ago
- Developer: Brahmaputra Infrastructure Pvt. Ltd.
- Owner: Brahmaputra Infrastructure Pvt. Ltd
- Num. of stores: 107
- Floor area: 4,50,000 sq. ft.
- Floors: 7
- Website: citycenterghy.com

Guwahati City Centre Mall is a shopping complex located in Guwahati, Assam, India. It is located in Christian Basti and it is also one of the largest malls of Assam and Northeast India. The mall was opened on 1 April 2018 and revamped in December 2018.

== Facilities ==
=== Brands ===
- The mall features several brands like Shoppers Stop, Levis, Nykaa, Park Avenue, Bata, Lenskart and Adidas.
- On 22 January 2021, a British lifestyle brand, WK Life, opened its first store in City Centre Mall in Guwahati.

=== Entertainment ===
- The mall also features a spacious food court and a PVR multiplex.
