= Guwahati Police Commissionerate =

Department of Assam police

- Motto: Maintain order, prevent and detect crime by enforcing law firmly and impartially, without fear or favor, prejudice or vindictiveness

Agency overview
- Formed: 1 January 2015; 11 years ago

Jurisdictional structure
- Operations jurisdiction: Guwahati, Assam, Kamrup Metropolitan District, India
- Legal jurisdiction: Kamrup Metropolitan District
- Governing body: Government of Assam
- General nature: Local civilian police

Operational structure
- Headquarters: Guwahati, Panbazar, 781001
- Agency executive: Partha Sarathi Mahanta, IPS, Commissioner of Police, Guwahati City
- Parent agency: Assam Police

Website
- police.assam.gov.in

The Guwahati Police Commissionerate is the law enforcement agency for the city of Guwahati, Assam, India. It is headed by the Commissioner of Police.

== Creation ==
The Commissionerate of Police in Guwahati was formed on 1 January 2015. It is still in its early stages.

== List of police commissioners ==
#	Name	From	To	Tenure
1	Jyotirmay Chakravarty, IPS (AM:1986)	1 January 2015	16 June 2015	166 days
2	Mukesh Agarwal, IPS (AM:1989)	16 June 2015	26 August 2016	1 year, 71 days
3	Hiren Chandra Nath, IPS (AM:1996)	27 August 2016	31 March 2018	1 year, 216 days
4	Pradip Chandra Saloi, IPS (AM:1999)	1 April 2018	31 December 2018	274 days
5	Deepak Kumar, IPS (AM:1994)	31 December 2018	13 December 2019	347 days
6	Munna Prasad Gupta, IPS (AM:1995)	13 December 2019	14 July 2021	1 year, 213 days
7	Harmeet Singh, IPS (AM:1992)	14 July 2021	16 December 2022	1 year, 155 days
8	Diganta Borah, IPS (AM:2004)	16 December 2022	30 December 2024	2 years, 14 days
9	Partha Sarathi Mahanta, IPS (AM:2007)	31 December 2024	Incumbent	1 year, 318 days
