= Cochin Stock Exchange =

Former stock exchange in Kerala, India

Cochin Stock Exchange (CSE or CoSE) was an Indian stock exchange in Kochi, Kerala. It was active until 2005. It was incorporated in 1978. At its peak, it had almost 500 Indian companies listed, and with a daily turnover of ₹70–₹100 crore (equivalent to ₹596 crore or US$62 million in 2023), it was the fourth largest exchange in India.

Cochin Stock Brokers, which provides trading facilities on the Bombay Stock Exchange, and CSE Institute, an educational organisation, continue to operate beyond the closure of the exchange.

== History ==
Cochin Stock Exchange was established in 1978.

During the 1990s, it was the fourth largest exchange in India by turnover, with a daily turnover of ₹70–₹100 crore (equivalent to ₹596 crore or US$62 million in 2023), with 476 Indian companies listed.

Computerized trading was introduced in 1997. The major back office system software used are NESS and BOSS respectively for NSE and BSE. The trading software used in CSBL was Multex, developed by CMC. Traders are provided Meta Stock and ERS software, trading terminals and optical fiber connections. DP holdings are maintained by demat services like CDSL.

The new millennium saw the stock exchange building being shifted from the old structure to a brand new building in the Kaloor area in northern Kochi.

Trading hours historically used to begin late in the afternoon enabling access to traders from other regions of the state. Base Minimum Capital required to be maintained is Rs. 2 lakhs.

The securities scam of the early nineties led the Securities and Exchange Board of India (SEBI) regulations on stock exchanges requires separation of ownership and trading rights and made it mandatory for majority ownership rests with the public, those without any trading rights.

The exchange stopped trading in 2005, and closing procedures after the SEBI introduced a minimum net worth requirement of ₹100 crore (equivalent to ₹170 crore or US$18 million in 2023) and a turnover of ₹1,000 crore (equivalent to ₹17 billion or US$180 million in 2023) for stock exchanges to continue operation in 2013. It was in the final stages of closure by May 2014.

== Economic impact ==
Industrialisation did not happen in Kerala to the extent as in other Indian states. The reasons for the failure to attract manufacturing industries was due to the political climate and the lack of resources in a small state with such a large population density. The stock exchange served as a channel for investors to find investment opportunities.

== Related organisations ==
Cochin Stock Brokers Limited (CSBL) previously wholly owned by Government of India, is a corporate member of the National Stock Exchange of India and the Bombay Stock Exchange, enabling CSBL users to have trading facilities in these listings.

CSE Institute is an organisation that provides stock market training for investors.

== See also ==
- List of Asian stock exchanges
- List of stock exchanges in the Commonwealth of Nations
