= Guwahati Food Awards =

Culinary award ceremony held in the state of Assam in India

- Awarded for: Excellence in Food and Beverage
- Location: Vivanta by Taj, Guwahati
- Country: India
- Presented by: G Plus
- First award: 2015; 11 years ago
- Website: www.guwahatifoodawards.com

Guwahati Food Awards (GFA) is an annual food award in India instituted in 2015. It aims to recognize superior services and achievements in the food and beverage industry of Guwahati, India.

The winners get selected through a multi-phase process that involves public voting, food tasting and jury visits.

== History ==
It was established in 2015 by G Plus.

== Editions ==
=== 2018 ===
This edition received over 157 nominations across 23 categories. The jury of GFA 2018 includes Chef Faruk Ahmed, Dr. Geeta Dutta and Aabhishek Bedi Varma, a former chef of Taj Group of Hotels and headed by Suresh Hinduja, the CEO of Gourmet India. Kunal Vijaykar was a chief guest for the event.

==== Winners ====
Category	Winner's Name
Best Bakery (Chain)	Loyans Bakery & Confectionery
Best Bakery (Single Outlet)	Style O Cake
Best Cafeteria	11th Avenue Cafe Bistro
Best Club/Lounge	Terra Mayaa
Best Fast Food Joint (Chain)	J14
Best Hangout Place	The Steaming Mug
Best Mithai Shop	Makhan Bhog
Best Multi-Cuisine Restaurant	Barbeque Nation Hospitality Ltd
Best Multi-Cuisine Restaurant	Kalita Spectrum
Best Pub/Bar	Underdoggs Sports Bar & Grill
Best Restaurant For All Day Dining	Kiranshree Sweets
Best Restaurant For Assamese Cuisine	Paradise
Best Restaurant For Bengali Cuisine	Ichchapuron
Best Restaurant For European Cuisine (Continental)	Ziya
Best Restaurant For Fine Dining	Legacy Restaurant, Hotel Palacio
Best Restaurant For Naga Cuisine	Nagameez
Best Restaurant For North Indian/Mughlai Cuisine	Tandoor, Hotel Dynasty
Best Restaurant For Oriental Cuisine	Red Hot Chilli Pepper
Best Restaurant For South Indian Cuisine	Chennai Kitchen
Best Restaurant For Vegetarian Food	Shahi Darbar
Restaurant of The Year	Rang De Basanti Urban Dhaba
Chef Of The Year	Bikash Sarkar ( Chef Moonu )

=== 2017 ===
GFA received 186 nominations across 25 categories in 2017. The special jury included Food critic and author Ashish Chopra and Suresh Hinduja, CEO of Gourmet India. Riyaaz Amlani, Restaurateur and President of National Restaurants Association of India (NRAI) was the Chief Guest for the event.

=== 2016 ===
The second edition of Guwahati Food Awards was held at Vivanta by Taj, Guwahati with Chief Guest Chef Manjit Gill, Corporate Chef, ITC Hotels and President of Indian Federation of Culinary Associations (IFCA).

=== 2015 ===
The first edition of Guwahati Food Awards was held at Radisson, Guwahati. The Chief Guest of the event was Sanjeev Pahwa - Senior Vice President – Asia for Carlson Rezidor Hotels.

== See also ==
- Assamese cuisine
- Indian food
- Indian cuisine
- Food competition
- Curry Awards
- Guild of Fine Food
