= CMC Limited =

Indian technology services company

- Type: Subsidiary
- Industry: Information technology
- Founded: 26 December 1975; 50 years ago
- Defunct: 1 October 2015; 10 years ago
- Fate: Merged with TCS
- Headquarters: New Delhi, India
- Area served: Worldwide
- Key people: N Chandrasekaran (Chairman); R.Ramanan (CEO & MD); JK Gupta (CFO)
- Services: IT services, IT consulting
- Revenue: ▲₹25,135 million (US$260 million) (2014-15)
- Net income: ▲₹2,771 million (US$29 million) (2014-15)
- Number of employees: 12,665 (2014-15)
- Parent: Tata Consultancy Services
- Subsidiaries: CMC Americas Inc.
- Website: www.cmcltd.com

CMC Limited was an information technology services, consulting and software company owned by Government of India headquartered in New Delhi, India . In 2001, CMC was sold by Government of India to Tata Consultancy Services and its owner, the Tata Group by the Indian Government.

== History ==
CMC was incorporated on 26 December 1975, as the 'Computer Maintenance Corporation Private Limited'. The Government of India (GoI) held 100 percent of the equity share capital. On 19 August 1977, it was converted into a public limited company, again wholly owned by the GoI.

In October 2001, CMC was privatized by the GoI, and was divested to a leading Indian IT firm, Tata Consultancy Services (TCS), which is the largest software services company in Asia.

In 1977, the Janata Party government took office in India. US-based MNCs which were operating in India were told to shut shop and ship out. IBM was one of the companies told to leave. In 1978, CMC took over the maintenance of IBM installations at over 800 locations around India. Subsequently, it also took over the maintenance of computers supplied by other (non-IBM) foreign players.

As early as 1980, CMC anticipated the way the world was moving and noted the market requirement for IT system improvements. It directed its efforts to respond to the government's activities and needs for such services. 'Project Interact' (International Education and Research for Applications of Computer Technology), a United Nations project involving design, development, and systems-engineering of computer-based systems applications in the areas of power distribution, railway freight operations management and meteorology transitioned the company from a hardware maintenance company to a broad IT solutions provider. CMC later expanded its services to systems integration, interfacing, installation, commissioning, software development, as well as education and training. CMC's R&D facility was set up in 1982 at Hyderabad.

CMC was renamed CMC Limited (Computer Maintenance Corporation) in August 1984. CMC Limited has the credit of introducing computer applications at a mass scale in the late 80s with its design and deployment of Indian Railways Reservation System IMPRESS (Integrated Multi-train Passenger Reservation System) in New Delhi on 15 October 1985. It went on to become a huge success, eventually deployed all over India, serving over half a million transactions every single day and cutting wait times for passengers drastically. CMC also followed it up with the design of ARTS (Advanced Railway Ticketing System) for unreserved ticketing.

Following a spurt in the global demand for IT services in the early 1990s, particularly in the United States, CMC decided to expand its operations and market its product and service offerings in these markets. Towards this end, in 1991, CMC acquired Baton Rouge International Inc, USA (it was subsequently renamed CMC Americas, Inc, in 2003), one of the first cross-border acquisitions by an Indian IT firm.

In 1992, the Indian government divested 16.69 per cent of CMC's equity to the General Insurance Corporation of India and its subsidiaries who, in turn, sold part of their stake to the public in 1996. In 1993, CMC's shares were listed on the Hyderabad Stock Exchange and the Bombay Stock Exchange (BSE).

To service and develop its clientele in the UK and Europe, CMC opened a branch office in London in 2000.

=== Privatization ===
In 2001, the government divested 51 percent of CMC's equity to Tata Sons Ltd, through a strategic sale, and CMC became a part of the Tata group.

In 2003, in line with its strategy of offering its products and services globally, CMC opened a branch office in Dubai to tap the hitherto unexplored markets of West Asia and Africa.

In 2004, the government disinvested its remaining 26.5 per cent stake in CMC to the public.

On 16 October 2014, thirteen years after the Tatas had acquired a majority stake in CMC, the Board of Directors of CMC decided to merge the company into Tata Consultancy Services Limited. The merger took effect on 1 October 2015. CMC employees become TCS employees with same CMC daily wage package.
