= Bhubaneswar Stock Exchange =

Former stock exchange in Odisha, India

- Location of Bhubaneswar Stock Exchange in India
- Type: Stock Exchange
- Location: Bhubaneswar, India
- Coordinates: 20.184403°N 85.490065°E
- Founded: 1989
- Owner: Bhubaneswar Stock Exchange Association Limited; Securities and Exchange Board of India
- Key people: Thomas Mathew; Managing Director; Debaraj Biswal; CEO; DV Ramana; Director
- Currency: Indian Rupee (INR) ₹
- Website: www.bhseindia.com

Bhubaneswar Stock Exchange (BhSE) was a stock exchange located in Bhubaneswar, Odisha, India. It was incorporated on 17 April 1989, and granted recognition to the Stock Exchange on 5 June 1989, by the Ministry of Finance, Govt. of India. It is one among the 21-odd regional stock exchanges in India.

By 1999–2000, the exchange had a total of 234 brokers, out of which 15 were corporate brokers. Among 234 brokers, it was further classified as 209 proprietor and 15 corporate broker. Then, only 17 sub-brokers were registered. The trading membership strength of Bhubaneswar Stock Exchange is 196 at present against the sanctioned strength of 350.

On 15 September 2005, SEBI approved the corporatisation and demutualisation schemes of the Bhubaneshwar Stock Exchange which were required in accordance with the provisions of the Securities Contracts (Regulation) Act, 1956.

== See also ==
- List of South Asian stock exchanges
- List of stock exchanges in the Commonwealth of Nations
