= Inter-connected Stock Exchange of India =

Stock exchange in India

Inter-connected Stock Exchange of India Ltd.
- Type: Stock Exchange
- Location: Mumbai, India
- Founded: 1998
- Owner: Ministry of Finance, Government of India.
- Currency: Indian rupee (₹)
- Website: www.iseindia.com

Inter-connected Stock Exchange Ltd. (ISE) was an Indian national-level stock exchange. under the ownership of Ministry of Finance, Government of India. It is responsible for providing trading, clearing, settlement, risk management and surveillance support to its trading members. It started its operation in 1998 in Vashi, Mumbai, and has 841 trading members, who are located in 18 cities. These intermediaries are administratively supported through the regional offices at Delhi, Kolkata, Patna, Ahmedabad, Coimbatore and Nagpur, besides Mumbai.

The ISE is promoted by 12 regional stock exchanges namely at Bangalore, Bhubaneshwar, Chennai, Kochi, Coimbatore, Guwahati, Indore, Jaipur, Kanpur, Mangalore, Magadh and Vadodara. The participating exchanges of ISE have 4,500 members and listed securities. It is a stock exchange of stock exchanges, members of the stock exchanges being traders on the ISE.

== History ==
At a meeting of the Federation of Indian Stock Exchanges held in October 1996, a steering committee was formed to evolve an Inter-Connected Market System. As a result, Inter-connected Stock Exchange (ISE), which was promoted by 14 regional stock exchanges of the country (excluding Calcutta, Delhi, Ahmedabad, Ludhiana and Pune Stock Exchange, apart from NSE, BSE and OTCEI) was incorporated by SEBI under the Securities Contracts (Regulations) Act, 1956 on 18 November 1998, ISE commenced trading on 26 February 1999.

ISE was launched with an objective of converting small, fragmented and illiquid markets into large, liquid national-level markets. ISE is also a professionally managed stock exchange with the Chairman of the Exchange being also a Public Representative Director from its inception. Unfortunately for the RSEs, particularly small brokers, the ISE experiment did not succeed. The daily turnover, which used to be Rs. 1 to 2 crore in the first six months, gradually declined to virtually zero level. Failure of ISE was, due to the bigger brokers of the participating RSEs failing to support any interest in trading on ISE due to commercial considerations. As a result, it becomes virtually impossible for ISE to create any worthwhile liquidity in its markets in competition with the breadth and depth of NSE and BSE. Markers continued to be fragmented as the participating RSEs did not close down their regional segments. All the while the small fragmented and illiquid market failed to emerge. ISE has also not succeeded in getting companies listed on it despite the stipulation by SEBI that the State of Maharashtra constituted the regional area for ISE due to lack of regulatory support for making it applicable to over 3,000 already listed companies in the State of Maharashtra. SEBI permitted ISE to exit bourse business as per the SEBI order on 8 December 2014.

== Services ==
=== Membership ===
A registered Member is entitled to execute trades and to clear and settle trades executed on his own account as well as on account of his clients in the Capital Markets Segment. Membership of the Exchange is open to corporate entities, individuals and partnership firms who fulfill the eligibility criteria laid down by SEBI and ISE

=== Depository services ===
Inter-connected Stock Exchange is a Depository Participant of Central Depository Service (India) Limited (CDSL) and National Securities Depository Limited (NSDL). ISE-DP has branches at Delhi, Kolkata, Patna, Guwahati, Ahmedabad, Hyderabad, Nagpur, Coimbatore, Tirunelveli and 155 Collection Centers across the country. Following depository services of CDSL are provided to the individual and corporate investors by ISE-DP:

- Dematerialisation (Demat)
- Rematerialisation (Remat)
- Pledge of Demat securities
- Electronic Access to Securities Information & Execution of Secured Transactions (easiest)
- Settlement of securities in Demat Mode
- Electronic Access to Securities in the form of Information (easi)

=== Research and Training ===
The ISE Training centre was established in November, 2000. It is a classroom training program on subjects related to the capital market, such as equities trading and settlement procedure, derivatives trading, day trading, arbitrage operations, technical analysis, financial planning, and compliance requirement. ISE also offers Joint Certification Training programmes in association with its partners.

=== Listing ===
The trading platform of ISE enables the 'Indian companies' to access equity capital, by providing a liquid and well-regulated market. Scrips which are already being traded on stock exchanges across India are traded on the Exchange. ISE's trading members in India trade on the scrips and provide liquidity and visibility to such scrips.

== See also ==
- List of stock exchanges in the Commonwealth of Nations
