= Ahmedabad Stock Exchange =

Stock exchange in Gujarat, India

Coordinates: 23°01′33″N 72°32′39″E

Emblem of the Ahmedabad Stock Exchange

The Ahmedabad Stock Exchange (ASE) was the second-oldest exchange of India located in Ahmedabad, Gujarat. It was owned by Government of India. Started in 1894, it was closed down in April 2018.

== History ==
The stock exchange was established as a Public Charitable Trust in 1894 following the establishment of the Bombay Stock Exchange in 1875. Earlier the stock exchange functioned under the framework of the Bombay Securities Contracts Act, 1925. Following the passage of The Securities Contract Regulations Act, 1956 the Gujarat Share & Stock Exchange, Indian Share and General Exchange Association and Bombay Share and Stock Exchange, Share and Stock Brokers Association merged with the Ahmedabad Share and Stock Brokers Association and gave rise to ASE.

It was recognised by the Securities Contract (Regulations) Act, 1956 as a permanent stock exchange.

ASE was the oldest stock exchange after Bombay Stock Exchange in India. ASE functioned in a 93 years old heritage building up to 1996 after which it shifted to a more modern building. The stock exchange went live on 12 December 1996. Initially, ASE used a system provided by IBM. After June 1999, ASE operated on Ahmedabad Stock Exchanges' Online Trading System (ASETS). This system was provided to ASE by Tata Consultancy Services Ltd. Members of the ASE could also trade on the Bombay Stock Exchange through a system called IBOSS. The stock exchange had 333 trading members then.

Market regulator Securities and Exchange Board of India (SEBI) issued notice to the ASE for withdrawal of recognition stating that regional stock exchanges whose net worth was less than Rs 100 crore and turnover less than Rs 1,000 crore would be closed. The old stock exchange building listed as a heritage building was put up for sale.

In April 2018, the SEBI permitted the Ahmedabad Stock Exchange to exit the stock exchange business. Under the agreement, ASE will cease its activities and change its name to remove the phrase "stock exchange" from it.

Its logo consists of the Swastika, which is one of the most auspicious symbols of Hinduism depicting wealth and prosperity.

== See also ==
- List of South Asian stock exchanges
- List of stock exchanges in the Commonwealth of Nations
