= Coimbatore Stock Exchange =

Defunct stock exchange in India

Coimbatore Stock Exchange (CSE) was a stock exchange in Coimbatore, India. It was granted recognition as a stock exchange by the Securities and Exchange Board of India (SEBI) in 1991.

In 1999, the exchange had refrained from restraining its members from furnishing unlimited personal guarantee to other exchanges.

The Exchange had failed to renew its licence with the SEBI in 2006, and in 2009, it made a formal request to the board to exit the trading business in 2009.

Prior to it becoming defunct, 170 companies were listed on the exchange. The exchange became dormant in the early 2000s due to the advent of online trading on larger stock exchanges.

== See also ==
- List of South Asian stock exchanges
- List of stock exchanges in the Commonwealth of Nations
