= OTC Exchange of India =

Former stock exchange in Mumbai, India

- Type: Stock Exchange
- Location: Mumbai, India
- Founded: 1990 Started function in the year 1992
- Owner: Government of India
- Key people: Praveen Mohnot (Managing Director)
- Currency: Indian rupee (₹)
- Website: www.otcei.net

The OTC Exchange Of India (OTCEI), also known as the Over-the-Counter Exchange of India, was based in Mumbai, Maharashtra. It is under the ownership of Ministry of Finance, Government of India. It is India's first exchange for small companies, as well as the first screen-based nationwide stock exchange in India. OTCEI was set up to access high-technology enterprising promoters in raising finance for new product development in a cost-effective manner and to provide a transparent and efficient trading system to investors.

OTCEI is promoted by the Unit Trust of India, the Industrial Credit and Investment Corporation of India, the Industrial Development Bank of India, the Industrial Finance Corporation of India, and other institutions, and is a recognised stock exchange under the SCR Act.

The OTC Exchange Of India was founded in 1990 under the Companies Act, 1956 and was recognized by the Securities Contracts Regulation Act, 1956 as a stock exchange. The OTCEI is no longer a functional exchange as the same has been de-recognised by SEBI vide its order dated 31 Mar 2015. OTCEI Securities Limited subsequently filed for liquidation on 25 September 2017.

== See also ==
- List of stock exchanges in the Commonwealth of Nations
