= Ludhiana Stock Exchange =

Former stock exchange in Punjab, India

Ludhiana Stock Exchange (LSE) was a stock exchange that was fully owned by Government of India. It was established in the year 1983. By 1999–2000, the exchange had a total of 285brokers, out of which 79 were corporate brokers. Among 284 brokers, it was further classified as 212 proprietor broker, 2 partnership broker and 70 corporate broker. Then, there was only 2 sub-brokers registered.

Ludhiana Stock Exchange became the second bourse in India to introduce modified carry forward system after Bombay Stock Exchange on 6 April 1998. On the same date, LSE also introduced a settlement guarantee fund (SGF). The SGF guarantees settlement of transactions and the carry forward facility provides liquidity to the stock market.

LSE became the first in India to start LSE Securities Ltd., a 100% owned subsidiary of the exchange. The LSE Securities got the ticket as sub-broker of the NSE. In 1998, the exchange also got permission to start derivative trading.

For the settlement of dematerialised securities, the Ludhiana Stock Exchange has also been linked up with National Securities Depository Limited.

== See also ==
- List of South Asian stock exchanges
- List of stock exchanges in the Commonwealth of Nations
