= Madras Stock Exchange =

Stock exchange in Chennai, India

- Type: Stock Exchange
- Location: Chennai, India
- Coordinates: 18.929681°N 72.833589°E
- Founded: 1937
- Closed: July 2015
- Owner: Government of India (100%)
- Currency: Indian rupee (₹)
- No. of listings: 1,785

The Madras Stock Exchange (MSE) was a stock exchange in Chennai, India. The now defunct MSE was the fourth stock exchange to be established in the country and the first in South India. It had a turnover (2001) of ₹ 3,090 crore ($440 million), but was a fraction (below 3.5 per cent) of the turnover generated by the Bombay Stock Exchange and National Stock Exchange of India. The turnover of the stock exchange was ₹19,907 Crore as of the financial year 2012.

== History ==
The Madras Stock Exchange Association (Private) Ltd. was registered on August 12, 1937. The first five founding member companies were Paterson & Co, Kothari & Co, Dalal & Co, Maconochie & Co and India Brokers'.

The Madras Stock Exchange Association (Private) Limited had been registered under the Indian Companies Act of 1913. After the coming into force of the Securities Contracts (Regulation) Act, 1956, which enactment was passed to prevent undesirable transactions in securities by regulating the business of dealing therein, by prohibiting auctions and for providing for certain other matters, the Company - Madras Stock Exchange Limited was incorporated on the 29th day of April, 1957.

When the Securities Contracts Regulation Act came into force in October 1957, the Madras Stock Exchange Association was converted into a company limited by guarantee under the Companies Act 1956. Membership of the Stock Exchange was also changed from firms to individuals, and the partners of the firms functioning at that time became individual members of the Stock Exchange.

In 1996, the MSE was fully computerised and online trading became operational, as the MSE was connected to 120 broking offices in and around Chennai through wide area networking. On 14 May 2015, SEBI permitted Madras stock exchange to exit. The Madras Stock Exchange ceased to exist on May 30, 2015.

After surrendering its license, MSE was rechristened Madras Enterprises Ltd and continues to trade as a sub broker to BSE and NSE.

== List of Former Presidents ==
Madras Stock Exchange - Past Presidents

	Name	Company name	Year
1	C. M. Kothari	Kothari & Sons	1937–1941
2	T.N. Krishnaswami	Dalal & Co	1941–1942
3	W.L. Knopp	Maconochie & Co	1942–1943
4	S. Narayanaswamy	Swastik & Co	1943–1945
5	T.N. Krishnaswami	Dalal & Co	1945–1946
6	S. Rm. Ct. A. Annamalai Chettiar	Trojan & Co	1946–1947
7	S. Ramaswami Naidu	Ramlal & Co	1947–1948
8	R. C. Paterson	Paterson & Co	1948–1949
9	S. Narayanaswamy	Chitra & Co	1949- 1950
10	V. S. Krishnaswami	V. S. Krishnaswami & Co	1950–1951

== Functions ==
The MSE had about 120 live members and 1,785 companies listed. The exchange followed the Rolling Settlement system, as per the January 2000 SEBI (Securities Exchange Board of India) guidelines and a proactive Grievance Cell is operational. By this system, investors could log in their complaints, for which a number was given for further reference, through which investors could keep track of the action taken by the exchange as regards their complaint.

A subsidiary company - MSE Financial Services Ltd, had been established. A member of the Bombay Stock Exchange, MSE Financial Services did help to create greater broker and investor flexibility through multi-market access. The members were able to trade in both BSE and MSE. This was followed up with National Stock Exchange (NSE) membership.

Trading on the exchange took place from 10.00 am to 3.30 pm.

== Merging ==
As per June 2012 notification from the Securities and Exchange Board of India (SEBI), whereby individual stock exchanges should maintain a minimum liquid net worth of ₹ 1,000 million and exchanges that do not comply with this requirement should close down their operations by June 2015, the Bangalore Stock Exchange (BgSE) decided to merge with the Madras Stock Exchange. The combined entity became the single largest regional exchange in the country with over 1,000 local companies listed exclusively on it. BgSE and MSE together had a liquid net worth of around ₹ 500 million while another ₹ 500 million will be raised by liquidating certain idle assets (situated in Bangalore and Chennai) of these exchanges.

== See also ==
- List of stock exchanges in the Commonwealth of Nations
- List of South Asian stock exchanges
- Economy of Chennai
