= Guwahati Refinery =

Oil refinery in Assam, India

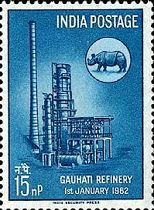
- Commemorative postage stamp issued by the Department of Posts, Government of India, to mark the inauguration of the Gauhati Oil Refinery
- Location: Guwahati, Assam, India

Refinery details
- Operator: Indian Oil Corporation
- Owner: Indian Oil Corporation
- Opened: January 1, 1962
- Capacity: 1.20 million metric tonnes per annum (MMTPA)

Guwahati Refinery is a public sector oil refinery located at Noonmati in Guwahati, Assam, India. It was commissioned on 1 January 1962 and is the first public sector refinery in India. The refinery is owned and operated by Indian Oil Corporation. It was inaugurated by Jawaharlal Nehru, the first Prime Minister of India.

The refinery was established with technical collaboration from Romania and has an installed capacity of 1.0 million metric tonnes per annum. It primarily processes crude oil sourced from the Upper Assam oil fields and plays a key role in meeting the energy requirements of the northeastern region of India.

== Products ==
The refinery produces a range of petroleum products, including liquefied petroleum gas (LPG), motor spirit (petrol), aviation turbine fuel (ATF), kerosene, high-speed diesel, light diesel oil and raw petroleum coke.

== Modernisation and technology ==
With growing environmental consciousness, Guwahati Refinery, Indian Oil Corporation Limited has also ventured into ecologically friendly fuel and subsequently installed 3 new units: the ISOSIV, the Hydrotreater and the INDMAX. The ISOSIV unit produces Lead Free Petrol by the Molecular Sieve Technology, which separates Octane rich MS components from feed naphtha. The Hydrotreater Unit (HDT) enables the Refinery to produce High Speed Diesel of very low sulphur and cetane number conforming to BIS specifications. The HDT also produces ATF, Superior Kerosene Oil with high smoke point and low sulphur. The Indane Maximization (INDMAX) technology developed by R&D Centre of Indian Oil installed at the Refinery is designed to achieve LPG yield as high as 44% through Fluidized Catalytic Cracking of residual feed stocks like Reduced Crude Oil, Coker Fuel Oil and Coker Gasolene. The INDMAX unit also enables Guwahati Refinery to upgrade all its residual products to high value distillate products and make it a zero residue Refinery.
