= Gauhati Stock Exchange =

Former stock exchange in Assam, India

Guwahati Stock Exchange (GSE) was a stock exchange located in Gauhati, Assam.

== History ==
Guwahati Stock Exchange was incorporated on 29 November 1983. It was officially recognised by the Government of India on 1 May 1984 and was permitted to be closed by market regulator SEBI in January 2015.

By 1999–2000, the exchange had a total of 206 brokers, out of which 5 were corporate brokers. Among 206 brokers, there were 200 proprietor brokers, 1 partnership broker and 5 corporate brokers; only 4 sub-brokers registered. At the time of exit, the GSE had 290 listed companies.

== Operations ==
The GSE was inter-connected with the National Stock Exchange of India (NSE) through the ISE Securities and Services Ltd. (ISS). ISS is the subsidiary of Inter-connected Stock Exchange of India Ltd. and GSE is one of the associated exchange of it. The trading of GSE is done through screen-based trading system.

== See also ==
- List of South Asian stock exchanges
- List of stock exchanges in the Commonwealth of Nations
