= Bangalore Stock Exchange =

Former stock exchange based in Bangalore, india

Bangalore Stock Exchange (BgSE) was a public stock exchange based in Bangalore, India fully owned by Government of India. It was founded in 1963 and had 595 regional and non-regional companies listed. In September 2005, the BgSE announced plans to go public by divesting at least 51% of its ownership. The stock exchange was managed by a Council of Management, consisting of members appointed by the Securities and Exchange Board of India. It was the first stock exchange in South India to start electronic trading of securities in 1996.

To keep pace with the fast changing technology and financial system, the Exchange went online in 1996. The Exchange had come a long way since the launch of BEST (Bangalore Electronic Securities Trading), its online trading system on 29 July 1996.

The Exchange had 241 members serving the diverse needs of investors. The corporate members constitute more than 25% of the total membership of the Exchange. Members operate within the overall framework of policies and practices developed over a period of time by the Exchange. As on 7 Jan 2014, 330 companies were listed on the Exchange.

In December 2008, SEBI had issued guidelines and laid down the framework for exit by stock exchanges. As per SEBI norms, a stock exchange, whose annual trading turnover on its platform was less than Rs 1,000 crore, can apply for voluntary surrender of recognition and exit, while a bourse which fails to achieve a turnover of Rs 1,000 crore, would be subject to compulsory exit process.

The shareholders of BgSE in its annual general body meeting held on 21 September 2013 passed the resolution to apply to SEBI for exiting as a stock exchange through voluntary surrender of recognition. Following this, BgSE had made a request to SEBI for its exit as stock exchange on 8 October 2013.

SEBI on 26 December 2014 permitted BgSE to exit from the bourse business.

== See also ==
- List of stock exchanges in the Commonwealth of Nations
