= Ratan Kumar Sinha =

Indian nuclear physicist

Dr. Ratan Kumar Sinha
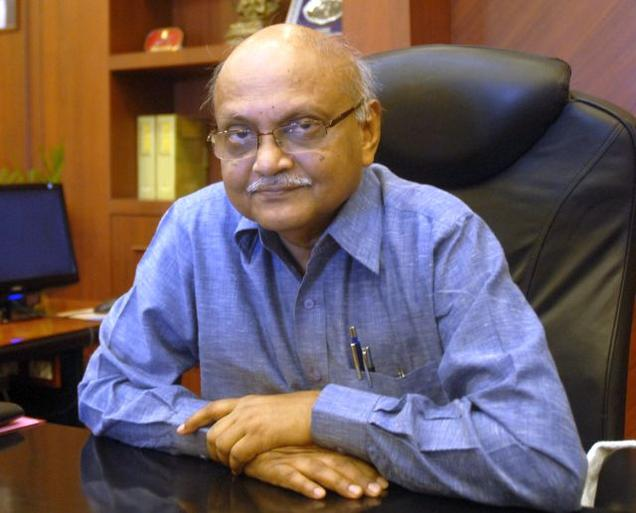
- Ratan Kumar Sinha

Chairperson Atomic Energy Commission and Secretary Department of Atomic Energy
- In office 30 April 2012 – 23 October 2015
- Preceded by: Dr. Srikumar Banerjee
- Succeeded by: Dr. Sekhar Basu

Former Director Bhabha Atomic Research Centre
- In office 19 May 2010 – 19 June 2012

Personal details
- Born: 23 October 1951 (age 74) Bihar, India
- Spouse: Bandana Sinha (m. 1977)
- Children: 2
- Education: Bihar College of Engineering, Patna University BARC Training School
- Profession: Mechanical Engineering, Reactor Design and Development, Nuclear Energy
- Known for: Advanced Nuclear Energy Systems including Thorium-based Reactors and Compact High Temperature Reactors
- Portfolio: Secretary, Department of Atomic Energy, Chairman, Atomic Energy Commission of India, Former Director, Bhabha Atomic Research Centre
- Awards: Homi Bhabha Science and Technology Award (1992), VASVIK Industrial Research Award Award (2000), Indian Nuclear Society (INS) Award (2001), Department of Atomic Energy (DAE) Special Contributions Award (2006), Indian National Academy of Engineering (INAE) Prof. S. N. Mitra Memorial Award (2006), Distinguished Academecian Award, Indian Institute of Technology Patna (2013)

Ratan Kumar Sinha, is an Indian nuclear scientist and mechanical engineer. He had served as the Secretary to the Government of India, Department of Atomic Energy (DAE) and Chairman of the Atomic Energy Commission (AEC), Government of India from April 2012 to October 2015. Prior to that, Ratan Kumar Sinha had served as Director of Bhabha Atomic Research Centre (BARC), Mumbai from May 2010 to June 2012. During the four decades of his career, Ratan Kumar Sinha held several important positions related to design & development of nuclear reactors for the Indian nuclear programme. He has been actively involved in the development of the advanced heavy water reactor (AHWR) and Compact High Temperature Reactor (CHTR), two of the highly acknowledged technological innovations which are suitable for large scale deployment of nuclear power, particularly in India.

As chairman, AEC and Secretary, DAE, Ratan Kumar Sinha had put special thrust on several key deliverables for sustainable development and deployment of nuclear energy. Major thrust areas, in continuation to his research at BARC, include advanced nuclear energy systems for thorium utilisation and accelerator technology. He had given high priority to application of radiation technology in the areas of healthcare management, agriculture, food preservation and water purification. He had also strengthened outreach activities of DAE for spreading awareness about the peaceful uses of atomic energy among the general public. He had been instrumental in kick starting several public outreach campaigns to present the human face of India's nuclear capabilities. Under his leadership, DAE displayed its first ever tableau in the 66th Republic Day Parade 2015 and had launched its social media page on Facebook as a part of public outreach initiatives.

Ratan Kumar Sinha has coined the phrase राष्ट्र की सेवा में परमाणु (Atoms in Service of the Nation) which has been imbibed as the motto of the Department of Atomic Energy. Motto of DAE is a part of the new logo of DAE launched in January 2014.

== Education and career ==
Ratan Kumar Sinha graduated in Mechanical Engineering from Patna University in 1972, securing the first position in the university. He joined the Reactor Engineering Division of BARC in the year 1973 after completing one-year training course at BARC Training School. After serving in various capacities in BARC, he headed the organisation as the Director during May 2010 to April 2012. He served as Secretary, Department of Atomic Energy and chairman, Atomic Energy Commission of India from May 2012 till his superannuation in October 2015. Subsequently, he has been conferred the position of DAE Homi Bhabha Chair Professor. He has also been appointed as the chairman of the newly constituted Thorium Implementation Platform to envision, plan and facilitate implementation of Thorium related programmes of India. He has represented India in several important technical and policy-making forums of the International Atomic Energy Agency (IAEA). These include the Steering Committee of IAEA's International Project on Innovative Nuclear Reactors and Fuel Cycles (INPRO), of which he was the chairman for four years from the year 2005 to 2008. Dr. Sinha is nationally and internationally recognized expert in the field of nuclear reactor technology.

== Contributions to next generation Indian reactors ==
Ratan Kumar Sinha has made significant contributions to the design, experimental development and implementation of next generation Indian reactors. He had been guiding the programmes for new advanced reactors, under design and development at BARC, Mumbai, to utilise thorium as fuel. These programmes include the Advanced Heavy Water Reactor (AHWR), which produces most of its power from thorium and has several innovative passive safety systems. Most of the technological innovations in the design of AHWR have been validated under his guidance, in large experimental facilities. He has contributed substantially to design and development of Indian High Temperature Reactors intended for hydrogen generation and has been instrumental in the guiding the design and development of Compact High Temperature Reactor (CHTR), which will serve as technology demonstrator for future larger high temperature reactors. Another salient objective of the CHTR is to demonstrate the technologies needed for transportable nuclear power packs capable of being deployed in remote areas with practically no need for skilled operation and no need to refuel for 15 years. This first-of-its-kind design incorporates thorium based coated particle type nuclear fuel, a reactor physics design to achieve inherently safe neutronic characteristics, use molten lead-bismuth as coolant driven by natural circulation, passive emergency cooling systems that deliver core heat to atmosphere, passive shutdown device and passive control devices capable of operation at very high temperatures. These innovative features are unparalleled in any other reactor in the world.

His initiatives in these areas are driven by a vision of achieving energy independence through the deployment of advanced nuclear energy systems that may be located close to population centres in our densely populated country. Dr. Sinha has overseen the launch of various important projects of the Department of Atomic Energy including the Kudankulam Nuclear Power Plant. The Prototype Fast Breeder Reactor (PFBR) is under advanced stages of construction in Kalpakkam, India. The foundation stone of the 2800 Megawatt Gorakhpur Nuclear Power Plant or the Gorakhpur Haryana Anu Vidyut Pariyojana (GHAVP) was laid in January 2014.

== Non-power applications and spin-off technologies ==
Ratan Kumar Sinha has enabled development of self-reliance, and international achievement in several domains of nuclear technology. In addition to guiding programs for the development of nuclear energy system, he has prioritised the application of radiation technology and spin-off R&D for enhanced contribution of Department of Atomic Energy towards healthcare management, agriculture & food preservation and water purification and other deliveries of direct societal relevance.

== Public outreach initiatives ==
Ratan Kumar Sinha has strengthened outreach activities of DAE for spreading awareness about nuclear energy among the general public. He has been instrumental in launching the maiden campaign of DAE in the television broadcast media over Doordarshan network of channel. He has encouraged participation of members of DAE in ground events, like Mumbai Marathon 2015, for greater outreach. He ran with the DAE contingent in Dream Run section of Mumbai Marathon 2015. Under his guidance and for the first time in its history, DAE participated and displayed its tableau in the 66th Republic Day Parade 2015 at Rajpath, New Delhi.

== Professional affiliations, awards and honours ==
Ratan Kumar Sinha is a member of International Nuclear Energy Academy (INEA) and Indian National Academy of Engineering (INAE) and a fellow of Maharashtra Academy of Sciences. He has several awards and honors to his credit including the first of the prestigious Homi Bhabha Science and Technology Award (1992), VASVIK Award (2000), Indian Nuclear Society (INS) Award (2001), the DAE Special Contributions Award (2006), INAE Prof. S. N. Mitra Memorial Award (2006). He was conferred with honorary Doctorate of Sciences (D.Sc.) degree by the University of Mysore (2009), PhD (h. c.) of Defence Institute of Advanced Technology, Pune (2013) and honorary Doctorate of Sciences (D.Sc.) by Amity University (2014). He is the recipient of Distinguished Academician Award from IIT Patna (2013), the Kurukshetra University Goyal Award (2015) and the South Indian Education Society's National Eminence Award for Science and Technology (2015).

== Publications ==
1. R.K. Sinha et al., 'Evaluation of Ultimate Tensile Strength using Miniature Disk Bend Test', Journal of Nuclear Materials (2015).
2. R.K. Sinha et al., 'Experimental determination of thermal contact conductance between pressure and calandria tubes of Indian pressurized heavy water reactors', Nuclear Engineering and Design, 284, 60 – 66, (2015).
3. R.K. Sinha et al.,'Use of Miniature Tensile Specimen for Measurement of Mechanical Properties', Procedia Engineering 86 (2014), 899 – 909.
4. R.K. Sinha et al., 'The National Grid of India', Indian Journal of Medical and Paediatric Oncology, July – September 2014, Volume 35, Issue 3, 226 – 227.
5. R.K. Sinha et al., 'Modeling flow and work hardening behaviour of cold worked Zr-2, 5 Nb pressure tube material in the temperature range of 30oC to 600oC, Nuclear Engineering and Design, 269, 52 – 56, (2014)
6. R.K. Sinha et al., 'Artificial Neural Network Modeling of In-Reactor Diametral Creep of Zr 2.5% Nb Pressure Tubes of Indian PHWRs', Annals of Nuclear Energy, Volume 69, Pages 246–251, July 2014,
7. R.K. Sinha et al., 'Analysis of Interaction of Calandria Tubes with the End Shields in Advanced Heavy Water Reactor (AHWR)’, Procedia Engineering 55 (2013) 333 – 341.
8. R.K. Sinha et al.,'Non-destructive assay of fissile materials through active neutron interrogation technique using pulsed neutron (plasma focus) device', Nuclear Instruments and Methods in Physics Research A (2012)
9. R.K. Sinha et al., 'A Mechanistic Approach for the Prediction of Critical Power in BWR Fuel Bundles', JSME Journal of Power and Energy System, Vol.6, p35-50, 2012.
10. R.K. Sinha et al.," Steady state behaviour of Natural Circulation loops operating with supercritical fluids for open and closed loop boundary conditions", Heat transfer Engineering Journal, published by Taylor and Francis, 33(9): 1–12, 2012.

List of his earlier publications is available on-line.

== See also ==
- Department of Atomic Energy
- Atomic Energy Commission of India
- Bhabha Atomic Research Center
