= List of University of Calcutta honorary degree recipients =

This is a list of honorary degree recipients from the University of Calcutta.

== Honorary degree recipients ==
Color key
Light green indicates "(Special)"; pink indicates "(Posthumous)"

Year	Name	Degree
1876	H.R.H. Albert Edward, Prince of Wales	Doctor in Law
1876	Monier Williams	Doctor in Law
1876	Krishna Mohan Banerjee	Doctor in Law
1876	Rajendralal Mitra	Doctor in Law
1897	Alfred Woodley Croft	Doctor in Law
1898	Mahendralal Sircar	Doctor in Law
1906	H.R.H. George Frederick Ernest Albert, Prince of Wales	Doctor in Law
1908	Andrew Henderson Leith Fraser	Doctor of Literature
1908	Asutosh Mookerjee	Doctor of Science
1908	Arthur Schuster	Doctor of Science
1908	Ramkrishna Gopal Bhandarkar	Doctor of Philosophy
1908	Pratul Chandra Chatterjee	Doctor of Law
1908	Gooroodas Banerjee	Doctor of Philosophy
1908	Eugene Lafont	Doctor of Science
1908	Herbert Hope Risley	Doctor of Philosophy
1908	Gerald Bomford	Doctor of Medicine
1908	Thomas Henry Holland	Doctor of Science
1908	Prafulla Chandra Ray	Doctor of Philosophy
1908	George Frederick William Thibaut	Doctor of Science
1908	Subbaiyar Subramaniya Aiyar	Doctor of Law
1911	Crown Prince of the German Empires of Prussia	Doctor of Law
1912	Douglas Craven Phillott	Doctor of Philosophy
1912	Paul Johannes Briihl	Doctor of Science
1912	Jagadish Chandra Bose	Doctor of Science
1913	Hermann Oldenberg	Doctor of Literature
1913	Andrew Russell Forsyth	Doctor of Science
1913	Taraknath Palit	Doctor of Law
1913	Paul Vinogradoff	Doctor of Law
1913	Hermann Jacobi	Doctor of Literature
1913	William Henry Young	Doctor of Science
1913	Rash Behari Ghosh	Doctor of Philosophy
1913	Rabindranath Tagore	Doctor of Literature
1913	Henry Hubert Hayden	Doctor of Science
1913	Sylvain Levi	Doctor of Literature
1920	Alfred Charles Auguste Foucher	Doctor of Literature
1921	Lawrence John Lumley Dundas, Earl of Ronaldshay	Doctor of Literature
1921	Rufus Daniel Isaacs, Earl of Reading	Doctor of Law
1921	William Jackson Pope	Doctor of Science
1921	William Alexander Craigie	Doctor of Literature
1921	Mokshagundam Visvesvaraya	Doctor of Science (Eng.)
1921	Brajendra Nath Seal	Doctor of Science
1921	Raghunath Purushottam Paranjpye	Doctor of Science
1921	John Hubert Marshall	Doctor of Philosophy
1921	Gilbert Thomas Walker	Doctor of Philosophy
1921	Rudrapatna Shama Sastri	Doctor of Philosophy
1921	Sakkottai Krishnaswami Aiyangar	Doctor of Philosophy
1921	Henry Stephen	Doctor of Philosophy
1921	Cuthbert Edmund Cullis	Doctor of Science
1921	Dinesh Chandra Sen	Doctor of Literature
1921	Devadatta Ramakrishna Bhandarkar	Doctor of Philosophy
1921	Chandrasekhara Venkata Raman	Doctor of Science
1921	Abanindranath Tagore	Doctor of Literature
1921	Syed Ameer Ali	Doctor of Law
1921	Arthur Anthony Macdonell	Doctor of Oriental
1921	Edward Albert Christian George Andrew Patrick David, Prince of Wales, Earl of Chester, Duke of Cornwall, High Steward of Windsor	Doctor of Law
1922	James Wilford Garner	Doctor of Law
1926	William Ewart Greaves	Doctor of Law
1928	Arnold Sommerfeld	Doctor of Science
1930	William Spence Urquhart (de)	Doctor of Law
1931	Rajendranath Mukherjee	Doctor of Science
1931	Heramba Chandra Maitra	Doctor of Literature
1931	Charles Albert Bentley	Doctor of Medicine
1932	Francis Stanley Jackson	Doctor of Science
1934	Hassan Suhrawardy	Doctor of Science
1938	James Hopwood Jeans	Doctor of Law
1938	Francis William Aston	Doctor of Law
1938	Ernest Barker	Doctor of Law
1938	Arthur Henry Reginald Buller	Doctor of Law
1938	Arthur Stanley Eddington	Doctor of Law
1938	Ronald Aylmer Fisher	Doctor of Law
1938	William Searle Holdsworth	Doctor of Law
1938	Carl Gustav Jung	Doctor of Law
1938	Charles Samuel Myers	Doctor of Law
1938	Walther Straub (de)	Doctor of Law
1938	Shyama Prasad Mukherjee	Doctor of Literature
1941	Nilratan Sircar	Doctor of Science
1942	Sarvepalli Radhakrishnan	Doctor of Law
1942	Mohammad Azizul Haque	Doctor of Literature
1944	Bidhan Chandra Roy	Doctor of Science
1948	Chakravarti Rajagopalachari	Doctor of Law
1949	Pramathanath Banerjee	Doctor of Literature
1952	Rajendra Prasad	Doctor of Law
1952	Harendra Coomar Mookerjee	Doctor of Literature
1952	Sambhunath Banerjee	Doctor of Law
1956	Jogeschandra Ray	Doctor of Literature
1957	Nandalal Bose	Doctor of Literature
1957	Rajsekhar Basu	Doctor of Literature
1957	Zakir Hussain	Doctor of Literature
1957	Vidhusekhar Bhattacharyya	Doctor of Literature
1957	Jogendranath Bagchi	Doctor of Literature
1957	Arnold Joseph Toynbee	Doctor of Literature
1957	Satyendra Nath Bose	Doctor of Science
1957	Lloyd Viel Berkner	Doctor of Science
1957	Chintaman Dwarkanath Deshmukh	Doctor of Science
1957	Jnanendra Chandra Ghosh	Doctor of Science
1957	Harold Spencer Jones	Doctor of Science
1957	Yoshio Kitagawa	Doctor of Science
1957	Kariamanickam Srinivasa Krishnan	Doctor of Science
1957	Prasanta Chandra Mahalanobis	Doctor of Science
1957	Arcot Lakshmanaswami Mudaliar	Doctor of Science
1957	Alexander Nesmeyanov	Doctor of Science
1957	J. Robert Oppenheimer	Doctor of Science
1957	Sudhi Ranjan Das	Doctor of Law
1957	Atul Chandra Gupta	Doctor of Law
1960	Niels Henrik David Bohr	Doctor of Science
1961	Nirmal Kumar Sidhanta	Doctor of Literature
1965	Gopinath Kaviraj	Doctor of Literature
1967	Satischandra Ghosh	Doctor of Literature
1968	Tarasankar Bandyopadhyay	Doctor of Literature
1968	Nilratan Dhar	Doctor of Science
1969	Ramesh Chandra Majumdar	Doctor of Literature
1969	Dilip Kumar Roy	Doctor of Literature
1969	Radhagobinda Nath	Doctor of Literature
1969	Suniti Kumar Chatterji	Doctor of Literature
1969	Debendra Mohan Bose	Doctor of Science
1970	Srikumar Bandyopadhyay	Doctor of Literature
1970	Priyadaranjan Ray	Doctor of Science
1971	Durgadas Basu	Doctor of Law
1972	Abu Sayeed Chowdhury	Doctor of Law
1973	Sailendranath Sen	Doctor of Medicine
1973	Prasantabihari Mukhopadhyay	Doctor of Law
1974	Hargobind Khorana	Doctor of Science
1975	Jnanendranath Mukhopadhyay	Doctor of Science
1976	Sumitranandan Pant	Doctor of Literature
1981	Gopal Chandra Bhattacharya	Doctor of Science
1982	Janardan Chakrabarti	Doctor of Literature
1982	Udipi Ramachandra Rao	Doctor of Science
1984	Rezaul Karim	Doctor of Literature
1985	Satyajit Ray	Doctor of Literature
1986	Pandit Ravi Shankar	Doctor of Literature
1986	Nelson Rolihlahla Mandela	Doctor of Literature
1988	Hemanta Kumar Mukhopadhyay	Doctor of Literature
1988	G. I. Marchuk	Doctor of Science
1989	Hirendranath Mukhopadhyay	Doctor of Literature
1989	Bhabatosh Datta	Doctor of Literature
1989	Ashesh Prasad Mitra	Doctor of Science
1989	Safdar Hashmi	Doctor of Literature
1990	Subodhchandra Sengupta	Doctor of Literature
1990	Srijib Bhattacharyya	Doctor of Literature
1990	Gopal Haldar	Doctor of Literature
1991	Võ Nguyên Giáp	Doctor of Literature
1993	Amartya Kumar Sen	Doctor of Literature
1993	Asghar Ali Engineer	Doctor of Literature
1994	Sambhu Nath De	Doctor of Science
1994	Giovanni Spadolini	Doctor of Literature
1995	Laxmi Mall Singhvi	Doctor of Law
1995	Durga Das Basu	Doctor of Literature
1995	Triguna Sen	Doctor of Science
1995	Radhanath Rath	Doctor of Literature
1997	Ali Akbar Khan	Doctor of Literature
1997	Leela Majumdar	Doctor of Literature
1998	Sushil Kumar Dhara	Doctor of Literature
1998	Binoy Krishna Chaudhuri	Doctor of Literature
1998	Pratap Chandra Chunder	Doctor of Literature
1998	Monkombu Sambasivan Swaminathan	Doctor of Science
1998	Autar Singh Paintal	Doctor of Science
2001	Jayant Vishnu Narlikar	Doctor of Science
2001	Noam Chomsky	Doctor of Literature
2002	Krishnaswami Kasturirangan	Doctor of Science
2002	Romila Thapar	Doctor of Literature
2003	Calyampudi Radhakrishna Rao	Doctor of Science
2003	Tapan Raychaudhuri	Doctor of Literature
2004	C. N. R. Rao	Doctor of Science
2004	Ashoke Sen	Doctor of Science
2005	Man Mohan Sharma	Doctor of Science
2005	Mihir Rakshit	Doctor of Science
2005	Nirmal Kumar Ganguly	Doctor of Literature
2006	Sankar Lal Adhya	Doctor of Science
2006	Andre Beteille	Doctor of Literature
2006	Purushottama Lal	Doctor of Literature
2007	Romano Prodi	Doctor of Science
2007	Jyoti Basu	Doctor of Law
2007	Nirendranath Chakraborty	Doctor of Literature
2007	Tapas Majumdar	Doctor of Literature
2008	Goverdhan Mehta	Doctor of Science
2008	Mushirul Hasan	Doctor of Literature
2008	Ratan Lal Brahmachary	Doctor of Science
2009	Mrinal Sen	Doctor of Literature
2009	Santi Pada Gon Chaudhuri	Doctor of Science
2009	Sunita Narain	Doctor of Science
2010	Jigme Khesar Namgyel Wangchuck	Doctor of Law
2010	Bimal Jalan	Doctor of Literature
2010	Srikumar Banerjee	Doctor of Science
2012	Shyam Benegal	Doctor of Literature
2012	U. R. Ananthamurthy	Doctor of Literature
2012	Pranab Kumar Sen	Doctor of Science
2013	R. Chidambaram	Doctor of Science
2013	Premnath Dogra	Doctor of Science
2013	Jitendra Nath Mohanty	Doctor of Literature
2014	Pranab Mukherjee	Doctor of Literature
2014	Muchkund Dubey	Doctor of Literature
2014	Bikash Sinha	Doctor of Science
2014	Lakshmi Shankar Ojha	Doctor of Science
2014	Antanas Paskevicius-Poska	Doctor of Literature
2015	T. V. Ramakrishnan	Doctor of Science
2015	Lord Hameed (Khalid Hameed)	Doctor of Science
2015	Sanjay Subrahmanyam	Doctor of Literature
2015	Pandit Birju Maharaj	Doctor of Literature
2015	Joy Goswami	Doctor of Literature
2018	Mamata Banerjee	Doctor of Literature
2019	Gopalkrishna Gandhi	Doctor of Literature
2019	Dilip Mahalanabis	Doctor of Science
2019	Srikumar Banerjee	Doctor of Science
2020	Abhijit Banerjee	Doctor of Literature

== See also ==
- University of Calcutta
- List of Calcutta University people
