= V. K. Iya =

Indian nuclear scientist (1927–2024)

Vasudeva Kilara Iya
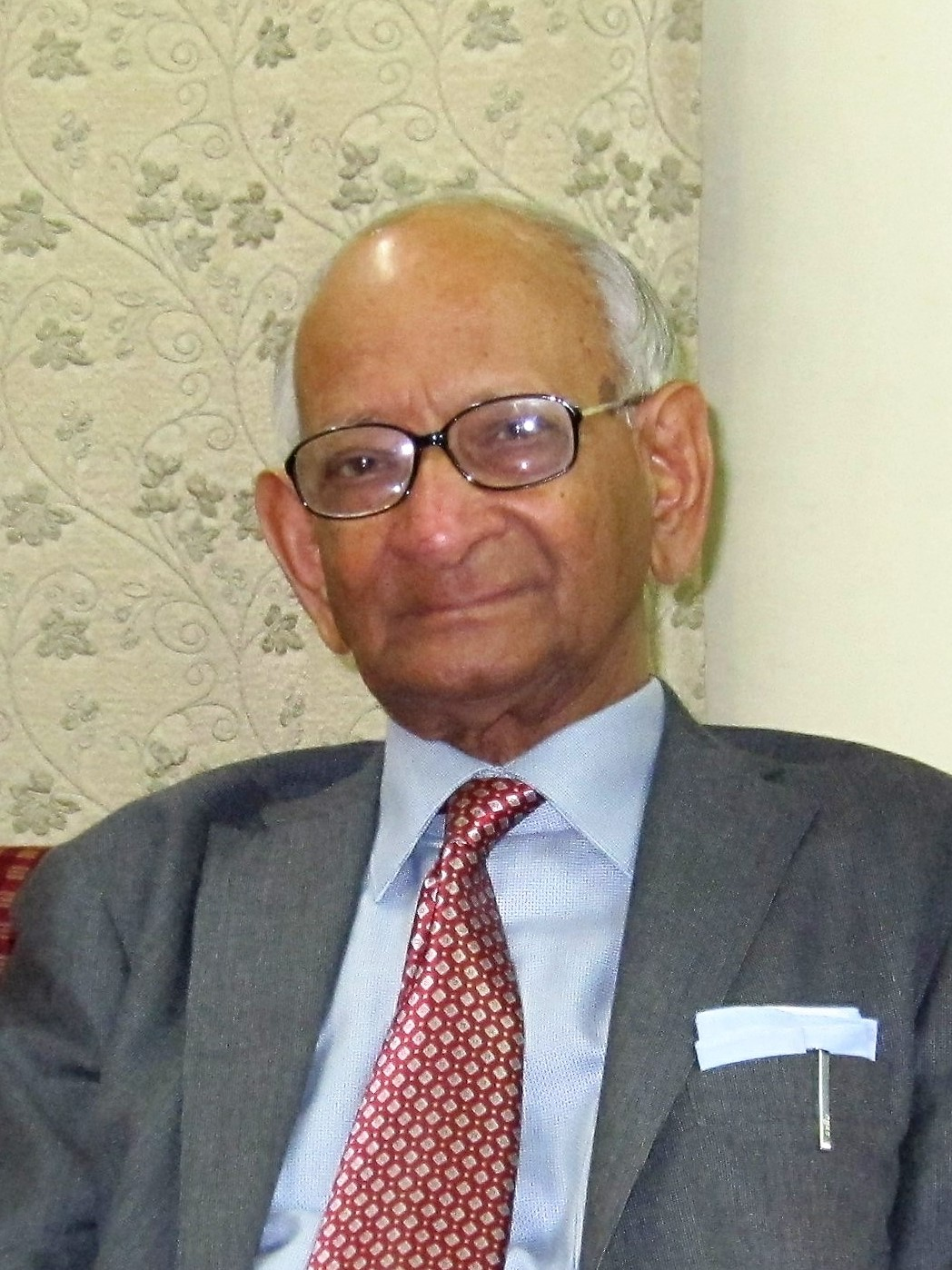
- Vasudeva Kilara Iya

Director, Isotope Group, Bhabha Atomic Research Centre, India (1974-1987)
- In office 1957–1987

Personal details
- Born: 16 September 1927 Baroda, Gujarat, India
- Died: 10 August 2024 (aged 96) Mumbai, India
- Spouse: Shrimati (m. 1957)
- Children: Vidya, Rekha
- Education: University of Mysore; Sorbonne University of Paris
- Profession: Scientist, Applications of Radioisotopes and Radiation in Healthcare and Industry
- Known for: Indian programme on radioisotopes and allied areas
- Portfolio: Director, Isotope Group, Bhabha Atomic Research Centre; Head, Radioisotope and Radiation Technology programme of the Department of Atomic Energy
- Awards: DAE-2009 Homi Bhabha Life Time Achievement Award (2011), Homi Bhabha Lifetime Achievement Award Award (2004), NAARRI Life Time Achievement Award (1995), Homi Bhabha Memorial Oration Award of Society of Nuclear Medicine (1979)

Vasudeva Kilara Iya (16 September 1927 – 10 August 2024) was an Indian nuclear scientist and the First Head of the radioisotope and radiation technology programme of the Department of Atomic Energy (DAE) and a former Group Director at BARC (1974–1987).

Iya is widely regarded as the founding father of the Indian programme on radioisotopes and allied areas. He is described as the ‘Pitamahah of Isotopes’ by Anil Kakodkar in his tribute to Iya in the Book ‘The Renaissance Man’ brought out by his daughters in 2010.

He played a key role in the formation of Board of Radiation and Isotope Technology (BRIT) in 1987. He is the first Chairman of the Experts Committee to evaluate and recommend grant of Performance Related Incentive Scheme - Group (PRIS-G) for the Industry and Mineral sector Units of DAE. He is the first Regional Cooperation Agreement for Research, Development and Training Related to Nuclear Science and Technology for Asia and the Pacific (RCA) National Representative of India for the IAEA-RCA initiative launched in 1972. He is the Founder President of the professional body, National Association for Applications of Radioisotopes and Radiation in Industry (NAARRI) formed in 1976; he also served as the President of the Association of Medical Physicists of India (AMPI, 1985–87).

The Prime Minister of India bestowed up on him the 2009 DAE Homi Bhabha Life Time Achievement Award in March 2011. He also received Life Time Achievement awards of professional bodies, NAARRI in 1995 and Indian Nuclear Society (INS) in November 2004.

== Early life, education and marriage ==
Vasudeva Kilara Iya was born on 16 September 1927 in Baroda (now Vadodara), Gujarat. He is the fifth child of his parents K. L. N. Iya and Sharda Iya. He graduated in Chemistry from the University of Pune, did his M.Sc., with 1st Rank and Gold Medal, from the Central College, Bangalore, affiliated to the University of Mysore. Joined the Indian Institute of Science as a Research Scholar in the General Chemistry Department in 1949. In September 1950, he left for France on a French Government Scholarship to pursue his Doctorate at the Sorbonne University of Paris. He completed his Docteur ès Sciences (D. Sc.) Degree (Tres Honourable) under Felix Trombe (Director of a lab under CNRS). The doctoral research work was on the separation and study of Scandium at the Rare Earths lab.

In June 1957, V. K. Iya married Shrimati, daughter of B. N. Sastri and Bhagirathamma Sastri.

== Professional career ==
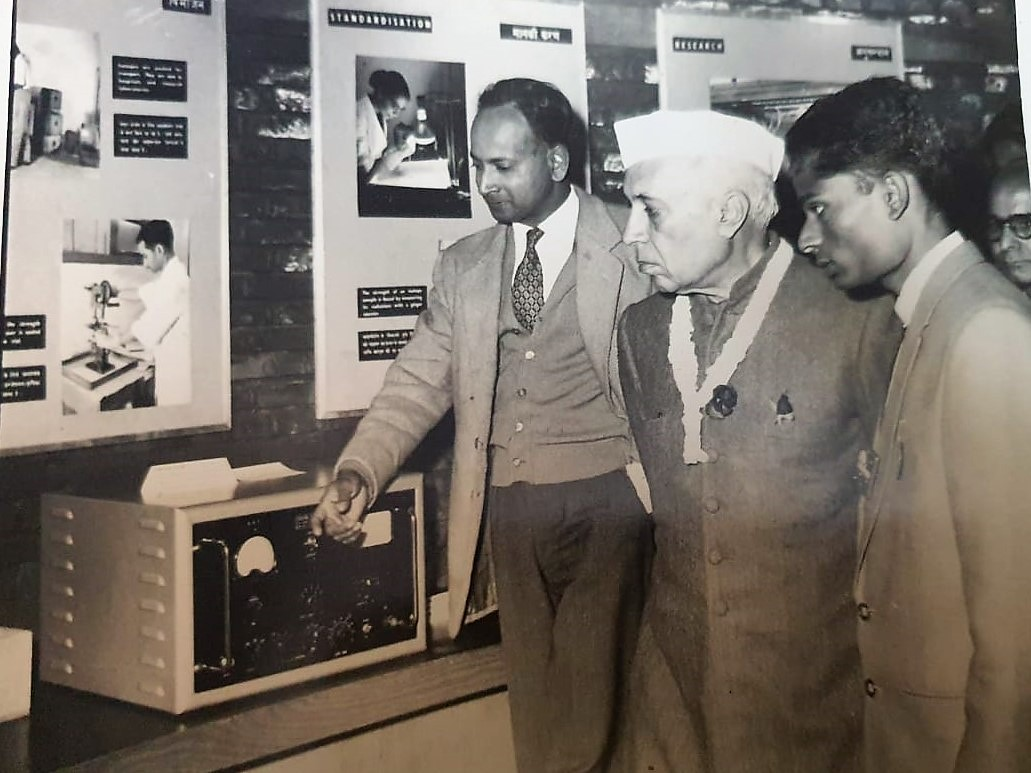
File photo: Dr V K Iya with Jawaharlal Nehru at Bhabha Atomic Research Centre, India

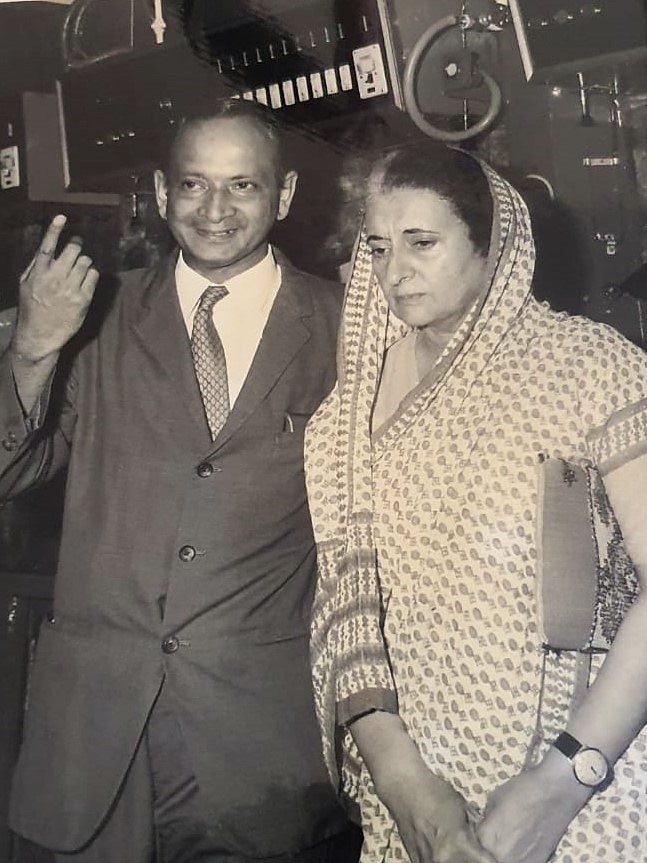
File photo: Dr V K Iya with Indira Gandhi at Bhabha Atomic Research Centre, India

Iya was personally selected by Homi J. Bhabha in Paris to join the Indian Atomic Energy Programme in 1955 and was directly put on deputation to work in the French Nuclear Laboratories at Saclay for two years. As suggested by Bhabha based on his personal association with Bertrand Goldschmidt (Commissioner, CEA, France), Iya could also study the production and separation of radioisotopes during this period.

In 1957, he joined the Chemistry Division of the then Atomic Energy Establishment, Trombay (AEET) which was subsequently renamed as Bhabha Atomic Research Centre (BARC).

Bhabha had initially availed the services of a British Scientist C.B.G. Taylor for the radioisotope programme and Iya took over the mantle, when Taylor returned to UK. He led the programme as the Head of Isotope Section and then became the Head of Isotope Division around 1963. In 1974, he was appointed Director of Isotope Group, the post he held until his superannuation at the end of September 1987. He oversaw the programmes of several major streams: radio-isotopes and radio-chemicals; labelled compounds; radiation sources; radio-pharmaceuticals; industrial applications of radiation and radio-tracers; radiation processing of materials and medical products; isotope hydrology; etc. Apart from all the above societal applications, he also played a role in the strategic programme of Peaceful Nuclear Explosion conducted at Pokharan under the code name Smiling Buddha on 18 May 1974. The radioisotope for the trigger device was produced under his leadership.

Iya was a Member of the Governing Council of Tata Memorial Hospital/Centre, Mumbai for a very long time. He was one of founder members of the department of Nuclear Medicine at the Cancer Institute (WIA), Chennai. He was also on the Governing Council/Board of several other organisations/institutes:

- Kidwai Memorial Hospital (later Inst. of Oncology), Bengaluru
- Bangalore Cancer Hospital (later Inst. of Oncology), Bengaluru
- Hinduja Hospital, Mumbai
- Hyderabad Science Society, Hyderabad
- Scientific Advisory Committee of Span Research Centre, Surat
- Chairperson of Radiopharmaceuticals Committee RPC from its inception in 1967 to 1987

Iya played a key role in the establishment of the new initiative for regional cooperation under the auspices of the IAEA and the birth of the scheme called ‘Regional Cooperation Agreement for Research, Development and Training Related to Nuclear Science and Technology for Asia and the Pacific (RCA)’ in 1972. He served as the RCA National Representative of India until his retirement.

Post his retirement, he remained an adviser and consultant to BARC, BRIT and DAE on the management of radioisotope programme. He was the Chairman of the DAE Committee constituted in 1998 to review and revamp the radioisotope programme of DAE and its Units BRIT and BARC. The Report prepared under his leadership provided the roadmap for all the subsequent programme focus and management structure.

== Legacy and achievements ==
Iya was a part of the first generation professionals of Indian atomic energy programme, with the pride of having worked with Homi Bhabha. His tenure, commencing from Cadell Road lab, spanned several first-of-a-kind accomplishments carried out in the laboratories in the South Site area of Trombay for the radioisotope programme in AEET. Initially the Apsara reactor, and subsequently the CIRUS reactor, gave a good boost to the programmes under his leadership. Iya is considered a pioneering scientist in the field of radioisotope where only a few countries of that time had such programmes and facilities. The pressing need for more laboratory space, and interest in having proximity to CIRUS reactor, were addressed by the design and setting up of isotope lab facilities in the new facility, RLG, built in the ‘north site’ of AEET. Iya was the Project Director for the BARC-UNDP cooperation initiative in setting up India's first gamma radiation sterilisation plant ISOMED commissioned in 1974.

The young Iya was part of the First Indian Delegation under the Leadership of Homi Bhabha to represent India at the IAEA's First General Conference (GC) in 1957. He was invited by Bhabha to be again in the team for the 1960 GC of IAEA.

Iya groomed a number of colleagues to become domain experts and leaders in various aspects of radioisotope programme and they carried forward his mission of the radioisotope programme with aplomb for the benefit of India. Some of them also served at the IAEA and thus the benefits of his grooming professionals reached many other countries through the IAEA.

== Death ==
Iya died in Mumbai on 10 August 2024, at the age of 96.

== Awards and honours ==
- DAE-2009 Homi Bhabha Life Time Achievement Award - bestowed in March 2011
- INS-2003 Homi Bhabha Lifetime Achievement Award - bestowed in Nov. 2004
- NAARRI Life Time Achievement Award - 1995
- Homi Bhabha Memorial Oration Award of Society of Nuclear Medicine, India - 1979
- (Founder) President, NAARRI (1976 onward)
