= Smiling Buddha =

India's first successful nuclear weapons test (1974)

Smiling Buddha Pokhran-I

Information
- Country: India
- Test site: Pokhran Test Range
- Coordinates: 27°04′44″N 71°43′21″E
- Period: 18 May 1974, 8:05 IST
- Number of tests: 1
- Test type: Underground shaft
- Device type: Fission
- Max. yield: 8–10 kilotons of TNT (33–42 TJ)

Test chronology

Smiling Buddha (MEA designation: Pokhran-I) was the code name of India's first successful nuclear weapon test on 18 May 1974. The nuclear fission bomb was detonated in the Pokhran Test Range of the Indian Army in Rajasthan. As per the United States military intelligence, the operation was named as Happy Krishna. The Indian Ministry of External Affairs (MEA) described the test as a peaceful nuclear explosion.

The bomb was built by scientists at the Bhabha Atomic Research Centre (BARC), in assistance with the Defence Research and Development Organisation (DRDO) headed by B. D. Nag Chaudhuri under the supervision of the Atomic Energy Commission headed by Homi Sethna. A CIRUS nuclear reactor given by Canada and heavy water (used as a neutron moderator) supplied by the United States were used in the production of nuclear material for the bomb. The preparations for the test and the detonation was conducted in extreme secrecy. It was tightly controlled by prime minister Indira Gandhi with very few people outside the team of scientists being aware of the test.

The device was of the implosion-type design with a plutonium core. It had a hexagonal cross section, 1.25 m (4 ft 1 in) in diameter, and weighed 1,400 kg (3,100 lb). It was assembled, mounted on a hexagonal metal tripod, and was transported to the test site on rails. The test was conducted at 8.05 IST on 18 May 1974. The data on the exact nuclear yield of the test has been varied and scarce, and sources indicate that the bomb might have yielded between six and ten kilotons.

It was the first confirmed nuclear weapons test by a nation outside the five permanent members of the United Nations Security Council. The test led to the formation of the Nuclear Suppliers Group (NSG) to control nuclear proliferation. After the test, India carried out a series of nuclear tests named Pokhran-II in 1998.

== Background ==
The origins of India's nuclear programme can be traced back to 1945 when Homi Bhabha established the Tata Institute of Fundamental Research with the aid of Tata Group. After Indian independence, the Atomic Energy Act was passed on 15 April 1948, that established the Indian Atomic Energy Commission (IAEC). India was involved in the development of the Nuclear Non-Proliferation Treaty, but ultimately did not sign it. In 1954, Department of Atomic Energy (DAE) was established which was responsible for the atomic energy development programme and was allocated a significant amount of the defence budget in the subsequent years. In 1956, the first nuclear reactor named APSARA became operational at Trombay, becoming the first operating reactor in Asia. A CIRUS reactor was given to India as a part of an understanding with Canada and the United States under the Atoms for Peace programme. India set up an indigenous programme to manufacture uranium nuclear fuel for the reactor, as opposed to importing from other countries. In July 1958, then Prime Minister Jawaharlal Nehru authorized "Project Phoenix" to build a reprocessing plant with a capacity to produce 20 tons of plutonium fuel a year using the PUREX process, designed by the Vitro Corporation of America. The construction of the plutonium plant began in 1961, and it was commissioned in mid-1964.

The civilian nuclear program to produce electricity from nuclear energy was also established during this period with plans to construct new nuclear power plants for the purpose. Nehru's discussions with Bhabha and Kenneth Nichols, a US Army engineer, showed his approach and intention to create nuclear weapons as a means of deterrence. In 1962, India was engaged in a war with China and with China pursuing its own atomic development programme, it accelerated India's need to develop nuclear weapons. During this period, India signed an agreement with Soviet Union to help build nuclear reactors in India.

== Development ==
With two reactors operational in early 1960s, Bhabha was involved in learning and development of know-how to manufacture nuclear weapons. The atomic energy act was amended in 1962 to give far more control to the central government. Bhabha was also aggressively lobbying for nuclear weapons and made several public speeches on the matter. He also estimated that a nuclear device with a 10 kt yield would cost US$350,000. The reactors were not producing fuel at the expected rate and with Nehru's death in 1964, the programme slowed down. The incoming prime minister Lal Bahadur Shastri gave approval for the Subterranean Nuclear Explosion Project in 1964 under Bhabha's insistence. However, Shastri did not want to commit to a weapons test yet, and later appointed physicist Vikram Sarabhai as the head of the nuclear programme. Because of Sarabhai's non-violent Gandhian beliefs, he directed the programme towards peaceful purposes rather than military development. Meanwhile, the design work on the bomb proceeded under physicist Raja Ramanna, who continued the nuclear weapons technology research after Bhabha's death in 1966.

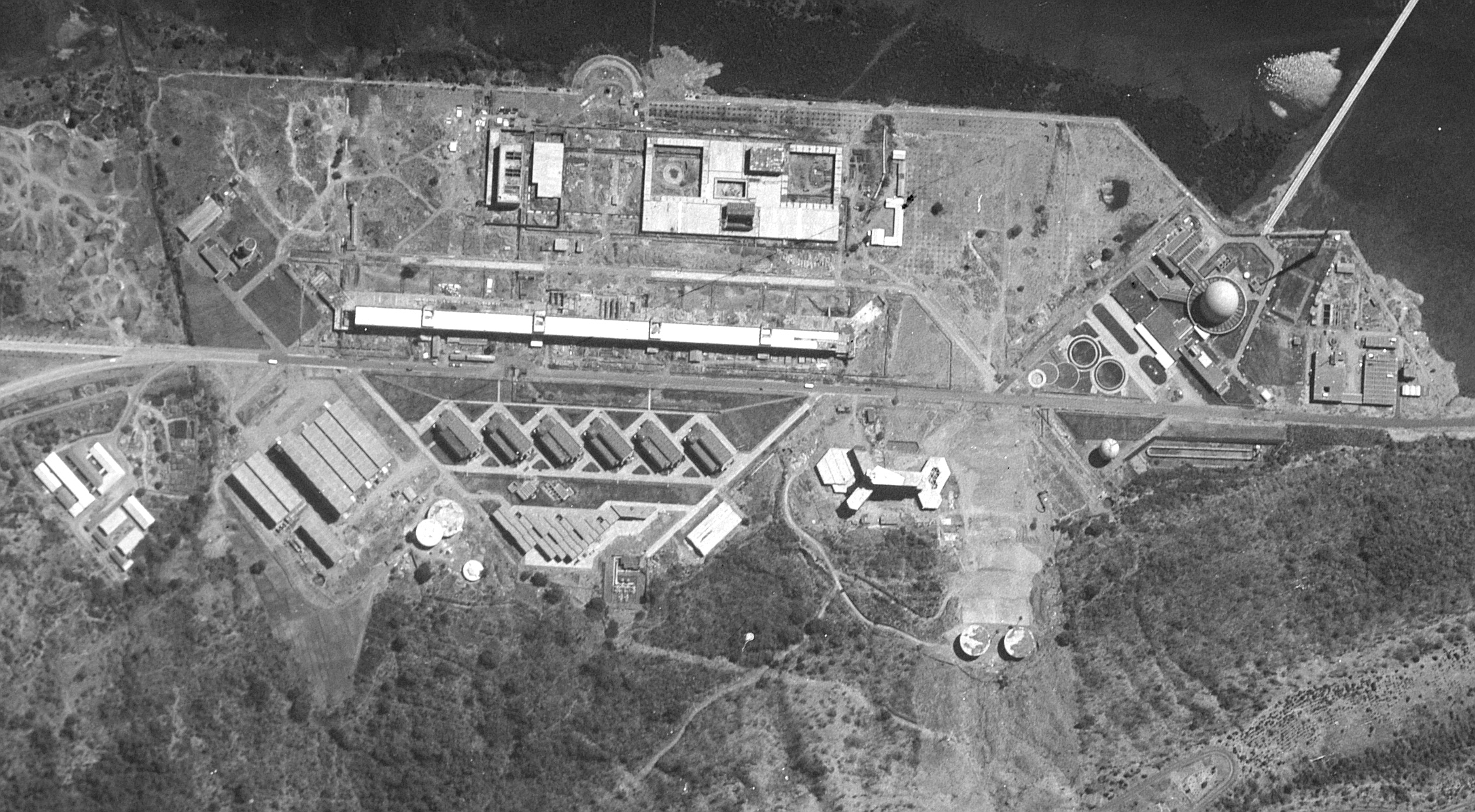
APSARA reactor and plutonium reprocessing facility at BARC as photographed by a US satellite on 19 February 1966

After Shastri's death in 1966, Indira Gandhi became the prime minister and work on the nuclear weapons programme resumed. Homi Sethna, a chemical engineer, was put in charge of plutonium development. The project for the design and manufacturing of the nuclear device employed just 75 scientists because of the secret nature of the project. Ramanna led the project with P. K. Iyengar serving as his deputy and the leadership team also included Sethna and Sarabhai. The weapons programme was directed towards the production of plutonium rather than uranium and then in 1969, enough plutonium had been accumulated for the production of a single nuclear bomb. In 1968–69, Iyengar led a team to the Soviet Union and toured the nuclear research facilities at Dubna. Upon his return to India, Iyengar set about developing a plutonium fueled fast breeder reactor named Purnima under Mahadeva Srinivasan. In 1969, R. Chidambaram was engaged for researching the use of plutonium.

Simultaneous work on the fabrication of the bomb core and implosion design was conducted by teams led by physicist V. S. Ramamurthy. The detonation system development began in April 1970 with Pranab R. Dastidar collaborating with W. D. Patwardhan at the High Energy Materials Research Laboratory (ERDL) of the Defence Research and Development Organisation (DRDO). In July, physicist B. D. Nagchaudhuri was appointed as the scientific adviser to the Defense Minister and as Director of the DRDO. Nagchaudhuri and Ramanna worked together to recruit the team and set up the requirements necessary for a nuclear weapon test. Terminal Ballistics Research Laboratory (TBRL) of the DRDO developed the explosive lenses for the implosion system. Srinivasan and K. Subba Rao were tasked with developing fission models and prediction of the test's efficiency. In April 1971, Nagchaudhuri appointed N. S. Venkatesan as the new Director of TBRL to help develop the implosion system. V.K. Iya was in charge of developing the neutron initiator system. In the same year, Sethna succeeded Sarabhai as the chairman of the Atomic Energy Commission.

In December 1971, during the Indo-Pakistani War, the U.S. government sent a carrier battle group led by the USS Enterprise (CVN-65) into the Bay of Bengal in an attempt to intimidate India. The Soviet Union responded by sending its own naval force to deter the U.S. from involving militarily. This event is indicated as a reason for India's pursuance of the nuclear programme. After India gained military and political initiative over Pakistan in the Indo-Pakistani war of 1971, the work on building a nuclear device continued. The hardware began to be built in early 1972 and the Prime Minister authorised the development of a nuclear test device in September 1972.

== Nuclear test ==
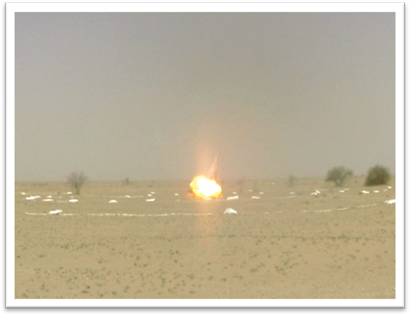
The test was conducted at the Pokhran Test Range (pictured during a test in 2019)

The Indian Army was involved in the test preparations at the Pokhran Test Range in Rajasthan. The project was code named Operation Smiling Buddha (MEA designation: Pokhran-I) while as per the United States military intelligence, the operation was named as Happy Krishna. The preparations were carried by civilian scientists assisted by the Indian Army. Indira Gandhi maintained tight control of all aspects of the preparations of the test, which was conducted in extreme secrecy. Besides Gandhi, only her advisers Parmeshwar Haksar and D. P. Dhar were kept informed. Dhar had protested the test, fearing that the sanctions that would follow, would affect the Indian economy. The Indian Defence Minister Jagjivan Ram was informed only a few days prior and Swaran Singh, the Minister of External Affairs, was given only 48 hours notice. General G. G. Bewoor, Indian army chief, and Lieutenant-General T. N. Raina, the commander of Indian Western Command were the only military commanders who knew about the test. The test was called a Peaceful Nuclear Explosive (PNE). The device was detonated on 18 May 1974 at 8.05 IST with Pranab R. Dastidar pushing the firing button.

The nuclear yield of the test has been difficult to determine with unclear data provided by Indian sources. Although politicians had given multiple numbers ranging from 2 kt to 20 kt, the official yield was initially set at 12 kt. Independent seismic data from outside and analysis of the crater features indicated a lower figure. Analysts estimate the yield at 4 to 6 kt, using conventional seismic magnitude-to-yield conversion formulas. Later, both Sethna and Iyengar conceded the official yield to be an exaggeration. Iyengar has stated that the yield was 8–10 kt, that the device was designed to yield 10 kt, and that the yield was 8 kt "exactly as predicted".

== Weapon design ==
An implosion-type nuclear weapon

The device was of the implosion-type design with a plutonium core, similar to Fat Man, the American nuclear bomb detonated over Nagasaki in 1945. The implosion system was assembled at the TBRL of the DRDO in Chandigarh. The detonation system was developed at the HEMRL of the DRDO in Pune. The 6 kg of plutonium came from the CIRUS reactor at BARC and the neutron initiator was of the polonium–beryllium type, code-named Flower. The entire nuclear bomb was engineered and assembled by Indian engineers at BARC before transportation to the test site. The fully assembled device had a hexagonal cross section, 1.25 m (4 ft 1 in) in diameter, and weighed 1,400 kg (3,100 lb). The device was mounted on a hexagonal metal tripod, and was transported to the shaft on rails which the army kept covered with sand.

== Reactions ==
=== Domestic reaction ===
Indian Prime Minister Indira Gandhi gained much popularity after the test, which had flagged from its heights after the 1971 war with Pakistan. The overall popularity and image of the Congress Party was enhanced and it was well received in the Indian Parliament. In 1975, Sethna, Ramanna and Nagchaudhuri were honoured with the Padma Vibhushan, India's second highest civilian award. Five other project members received the Padma Shri, India's fourth highest civilian award. India consistently maintained that this was a peaceful nuclear bomb test and that it had no intentions of militarising its nuclear programme, but according to independent monitors, this test was part of an accelerated Indian nuclear programme. In 1997 Raja Ramanna, speaking to the Press Trust of India, maintained:

The Pokhran test was a bomb, I can tell you now.... An explosion is an explosion, a gun is a gun, whether you shoot at someone or shoot at the ground.... I just want to make clear that the test was not all that peaceful.

— Raja Ramanna, _{to Press Trust of India in 1997}

=== International reaction ===
While India continued to state that the test was for peaceful purposes, it encountered opposition from many quarters. In reaction to the tests, the Nuclear Suppliers Group (NSG) was established to check international nuclear proliferation. The NSG decided in 1992 to require full-scope IAEA safeguards for any new nuclear export deals, which effectively ruled out nuclear exports to India. It was only waived as part of the Indo-US civilian nuclear agreement in 2008.

The plutonium used in the test had been enriched in the reactor supplied by Canada, using heavy water (used as neutron moderator) supplied by the United States. Both the countries reacted negatively, especially in light of then ongoing negotiations on the Nuclear Non-Proliferation Treaty and the economic aid both countries had provided to India. Canada concluded that the test violated a 1971 understanding between the two states, and froze nuclear energy assistance for the two heavy water reactors then under construction. However, the United States concluded that the test did not violate any agreement and proceeded with a June 1974 shipment of enriched uranium for the Tarapur reactor. New Zealand's Prime Minister Norman Kirk commented that, "The announcement of an underground nuclear explosion by India raises more urgently than ever the need for international agreement to end all nuclear testing."

Pakistan did not view the test as a peaceful nuclear explosion, and cancelled scheduled talks with India. In June 1974, Prime Minister Zulfikar Ali Bhutto said that Pakistan considered this as an intimidation and would not accept India's superiority in the subcontinent. In 2011, Pakistani nuclear physicist Pervez Hoodbhoy stated that he believed the test pressed Pakistan into developing nuclear weapons of its own.

== Aftermath ==
Though the test was carried out in an uninhabited area, the government compensated the residents of the villages–Odhaniya, Chacha, Loharki, and Khetolai, which were within a five-kilometre (3 mi) radius, and whose inhabitants were largely unaware of the test and its effects. The residents were paid between ₹3 (equivalent to ₹98 or US$1.00 in 2026) to ₹4 (equivalent to ₹130 or US$1.40 in 2026) for each bigha (approximately 2,500 m^{2} or 27,000 sq ft) of land they owned.

According to a 2014 report, there were reported instances of crop failure and abnormal symptoms such as skin irritation, and burning of eyes in both humans and cattle in the aftermath of the blast. The villagers complained of an increase in the rate of cancers and genetic disorders in the years following the explosion. As per the report, a research report released in September 1992 in the Indian Journal of Cancer identified a quadruple increase in the rate of cancers in one of the villages compared to the national average. However, since no epidemiological studies have been carried out in the region in the aftermath of the blast, it cannot be established with certainty that these were due to radiation exposure.

== Other tests ==
Despite many proposals, India did not carry out further nuclear tests until 1998. Code named as Operation Shakti (officially known as Pokhran-II) was carried out at the Pokhran test site, using technology designed and built over the preceding two decades.

== See also ==
- India and weapons of mass destruction
- History of nuclear weapons
- List of countries with nuclear weapons
- Pokhran-II
