= Madhusoodan V. Hosur =

Indian structural biologist

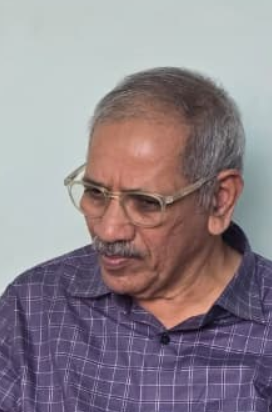
- Born: 24 December 1950 (age 75); India
- Education: Indian Institute of Science; Karnatak University
- Known for: Structural studies of HIV-1 protease; Viral protein crystallography; Drug design research
- Awards: Fellow of the Indian National Science Academy (2010)
- Scientific career
- Fields: Structural biology; Crystallography
- Workplaces: Bhabha Atomic Research Centre; ACTREC of Tata Memorial Centre; National Institute of Advanced Studies

Madhusoodan Vijayacharya Hosur (born 24 December 1950) also known as MV Hosur is an Indian structural biologist and crystallographer known for his work on macromolecular crystallography, including viral and HIV-1 protease structures, and for contributions to drug-design research.

== Early life and education ==
He received his Ph.D. in X-ray crystallography of nucleotides, coenzymes and high-energy phosphates from the Indian Institute of Science (IISc), Bengaluru, India during (1973–1979).

He then carried out early work as a Research Associate, University of Wisconsin–Madison (1979–1981), on the X-ray crystallography of oligonucleotides. Later he worked at the Purdue University (1982–1986) on the X-ray structure of spherical viruses.

== Career ==
He joined BARC, Mumbai, as Scientific Officer in 1986 and stayed there until 1999 on the work related to macromolecular crystallography and drug‐design.

From 1999 to 2012, he was with the Protein Crystallography Section, Solid-State Physics Division (SSPD) at BARC as head. His work was focused on viral protein structures, malaria proteins, and drug-resistance mechanisms. Later he moved to the Advanced Centre for Treatment Research and Education in Cancer (ACTREC) in Navi Mumbai, continuing his research in biophysics, crystallography, and big-data epilepsy from 2013 to 2016.

From 2017 onward, he has been an INSA-Senior scientist and holding adjunct professorship at the National Institute of Advanced Studies, Bangalore. He focuses on big-data approaches in epilepsy and other biomedical fields.

== Awards and honours ==
- Fellow of the Indian National Science Academy (INSA) (2010)
- Wenner‑Gren Visiting Fellowship at Lund University (2001)
- Martin‐Forster Gold Medal from Indian Institute of Science (1979)

== Selected Bibliography ==
- Chaudhuri, T; Hosur, MV (2024). "Molecular modelling reveals how abundance of α4 sub-type in synaptic GABAR(A) receptor can lead to refractoriness toward GABA and BZ-type drugs". Journal of Biomolecular Structure & Dynamics. 42 (24): 13680–13687. doi:10.1080/07391102.2023.2277858. PMID 37948195.
- Chaudhuri, T; Chintalapati, J; Hosur, MV (2021). "Identification of 3'-UTR single nucleotide variants and prediction of select protein imbalance in mesial temporal lobe epilepsy patients". PLOS ONE. 16 (6) e0252475. Bibcode:2021PLoSO..1652475C. doi:10.1371/journal.pone.0252475. PMC 8177469. PMID 34086756.
- Prashar, V; Bihani, SC; Ferrer, JL; Hosur, MV (September 2015). "Structural Basis of Why Nelfinavir-Resistant D30N Mutant of HIV-1 Protease Remains Susceptible to Saquinavir". Chemical Biology & Drug Design. 86 (3): 302–8. doi:10.1111/cbdd.12494. PMID 25487655.
- Bihani, S; Das, A; Prashar, V; Ferrer, JL; Hosur, MV (15 February 2009). "X-ray structure of HIV-1 protease in situ product complex". Proteins. 74 (3): 594–602. doi:10.1002/prot.22174. PMID 18704947.
- Prashar, V; Hosur, MV (29 October 2004). "1.8A X-ray structure of C95M/C1095F double mutant of tethered HIV-1 protease dimer complexed with acetyl pepstatin". Biochemical and Biophysical Research Communications. 323 (4): 1229–35. Bibcode:2004BBRC..323.1229P. doi:10.1016/j.bbrc.2004.08.226. PMID 15451428.
- Hosur, MV; Sainis, JK; Kannan, KK (20 December 1993). "Crystallization and X-ray analysis of a multienzyme complex containing RUBISCO and RuBP". Journal of Molecular Biology. 234 (4): 1274–8. doi:10.1006/jmbi.1993.1681. PMID 8263930.
- Hosur, MV; Schmidt, T; Tucker, RC; Johnson, JE; Gallagher, TM; Selling, BH; Rueckert, RR (1987). "Structure of an insect virus at 3.0 A resolution". Proteins. 2 (3): 167–76. doi:10.1002/prot.340020302. PMID 3447176.
