= Raja Ramanna =

Indian physicist

Director General of Defence research and development organisation
- In office 1978-1982
- Preceded by: MGK Menon
- Succeeded by: VSR Arunachalam

Personal details
- Born: 28 January 1925 Tiptur, Princely State of Mysore, British India (now in Tumkur district, Karnataka, India)
- Died: 24 September 2004 (aged 79) Mumbai, Maharashtra, India
- Citizenship: India
- Education: Bishop Cotton Boys School; Madras Christian College; University of Madras; University of Mumbai; King's College London
- Known for: India's nuclear program; Operation Smiling Buddha; Operation Shakti
- Awards: Padma Shri (1968); Padma Bhushan (1973); Padma Vibhushan (1975)
- Scientific career
- Fields: Nuclear Physics
- Workplaces: Bhabha Atomic Research Centre; Defence Research and Development Organisation; International Atomic Energy Agency; Ministry of Defence; National Institute of Advanced Studies

Raja Ramanna (28 January 1925 – 24 September 2004) was an Indian nuclear physicist. He was the director of India's nuclear program in the late 1960s and early 1970s, which culminated in Smiling Buddha, India's first successful nuclear weapon test on 18 May 1974.

Ramanna obtained his bachelor's degree in Physics at Madras University and PhD from King's College, London. He joined the Tata Institute of Fundamental Research and later the Bhabha Atomic Research Centre (BARC) to work on nuclear physics. Ramanna worked under Homi Jehangir Bhabha, whom he had met earlier in 1944. He joined the nuclear program in 1964, and later became the director of this program in 1967. Ramanna expanded and supervised scientific research on nuclear weapons and was in charge of the team of scientists at Bhabha Atomic Research Centre (BARC) that designed and carried out the testing of the first nuclear device in 1974. Ramanna was associated with India's nuclear program for more than four decades, and also facilitated research for the Indian Armed Forces.

He served in various roles such as Secretary for Defence Research, Government of India (1978–81), Scientific Adviser to the Minister of Defence (1978–81), Director-general of Defence Research and Development Organisation (1978–82), Chairman of Atomic Energy Commission (1983–87) and Secretary of the Department of Atomic Energy (1983–87). He later became the Minister of state for defence in 1990. He served as a Member of Parliament, Rajya Sabha from 1997 to 2003. Towards the later part of his career, he advocated against nuclear proliferation and testing.

Ramanna was associated with various academic institutions. He was the founder-director of National Institute of Advanced Studies and served as the chairman of board of governors at IIT Bombay. He has been awarded multiple honorary doctorates by various universities. He was awarded the Padma Vibhushan, India's second highest civilian decoration, in 1975. Ramanna died in Mumbai in 2004 at the age of 79.

== Early life and education ==
Raja Ramanna was born on 28 January 1925 to Rukmini and Ramanna in Tiptur, Princely State of Mysore, British India (now in Tumkur district, Karnataka, India). His father was working in the judicial department. Ramanna claimed to have been influenced by his mother's sister Rajamma, who was a government teacher. He did his early schooling at Dalvoy School and Good Shepherd Convent in Mysore before moving to Bishop Cotton Boys' School in Bangalore. Ramanna was interested in music from a young age and began taking piano lessons at the age of six. He auditioned in front of the Maharaja of Mysore at the age of 12.

He later attended Madras Christian College, where he graduated with a BSc in physics from the University of Madras in 1945. Ramanna obtained his master's degree from Bombay University. In 1949, he completed his PhD in nuclear physics from King's College in London on a scholarship from Tata Group.

== Career ==
=== Early career (1949-59) ===
Ramanna had met Homi J. Bhabha in 1944 and was inspired by his work. In 1949, Ramanna joined Tata Institute of Fundamental Research to work under Bhabha. In 1952, he started working on the Indian nuclear programme at the Atomic Energy Establishment in Trombay (later renamed as Bhabha Atomic Research Centre (BARC)). In 1957, the first research nuclear reactor Apsara became operational at BARC and Ramanna was part of the team working on the same. He was working on neutron emission studies and research on nuclear fission. In July 1958, then Prime Minister Jawaharlal Nehru authorized "Project Phoenix" to produce weapon grade Plutonium. In 1957, Ramanna established a training school at BARC to facilitate training of scientists in nuclear physics.

=== Heading the nuclear programme (1960-69) ===
In the early 1960s, he was involved in learning and development of know-how to manufacture nuclear weapons. After Bhabha's unexpected death in 1966, the design work on the atomic bomb proceeded under Ramanna, who took charge of the nuclear weapons technology research. When Indira Gandhi became the prime minister in 1966, the project for the design and manufacturing of the nuclear device proceeded secretly. The program employed 75 scientists with Ramanna heading the project and P. K. Iyengar serving as his deputy. Later, the weapons programme was directed towards the production of plutonium rather than uranium and in 1969, enough plutonium had been accumulated for the production of a single nuclear bomb. In 1968–69, a plutonium fueled fast breeder reactor named Purnima was established at BARC.

=== First nuclear test (1970-75) ===
In July 1970, physicist B. D. Nagchaudhuri was appointed as the scientific adviser to the Defense Minister and as Director of the Defence Research and Development Organisation (DRDO). Nagchaudhuri and Ramanna worked together to recruit the team and set up the requirements necessary for a nuclear weapon test. In 1971, Homi Sethna succeeded Vikram Sarabhai as the chairman of the Atomic Energy Commission, completing the leadership group. After India gained military and political initiative over Pakistan in the Indo-Pakistani war of 1971, the work on building a nuclear device continued with Ramanna being appointed as the chairman of BARC in 1972.

The hardware for the bomb began to be built in early 1972 and the Prime Minister authorized the development of a nuclear test device in September 1972. The nuclear test was planned for May 1974 with tight control being maintained on all aspects of the preparations of the test, which was conducted in extreme secrecy. The test was code named Smiling Buddha and called as a Peaceful Nuclear Explosive (PNE). A nuclear fission device was successfully detonated on 18 May 1974 at 8.05 IST. In 1975, Ramanna was honored with the Padma Vibhushan, India's second highest civilian award.

=== Intermediate years (1975-87) ===
Ramanna served as Vice President of the Indian Academy of Sciences from 1977 to 1979 and as President of Indian National Science Academy in New Delhi from 1977 to 1978. Post the test, Indira Gandhi authorized preliminary work to commence on the development of a fusion boosted fission bomb. Differences in opinion arose between Sethna and Ramanna, which affected the progress of the program. In 1978, then Prime Minister Morarji Desai moved Ramanna from BARC to made him the secretary of defense research and scientific advisor to the Ministry of Defense. Later, he was also appointed as the Director General of DRDO. In the same year, then President of Iraq Saddam Hussein approached Ramanna for help in building a nuclear bomb when Ramanna visited Baghdad. Ramanna refused and returned to India.

With the return of Indira Gandhi in 1980, the nuclear program gained momentum and Ramanna was re-appointed as the director of BARC. She authorized Ramanna to prepare for further nuclear tests and two new shafts were constructed at the Pokhran test range in 1984. Ramanna pushed forward with a Uranium enrichment program and Dhruva, a new reactor with a capability to produce larger quantities of weapon grade material, was constructed. As a part of the nuclear programme, components for a nuclear fusion bomb were developed but no testing took place. In 1983, Ramanna was made as the secretary of Department of Atomic Energy. In 1984, he was made the chairman of Atomic Energy Commission, which he held for three years. In the same year, Ramanna represented the South Asian and Middle Eastern bloc at the International Atomic Energy Agency (IAEA). Later, he served as the chairman of the Scientific Advisory Committee to the Director General of IAEA and as president of the 30th General Conference in 1986. In late 1985, a study group commissioned by the Prime Minister of India consisting of Ramanna and few others, outlined a plan for the production of 70 to 100 nuclear warheads and a strict no first use policy.

=== Later years (1988–2003) ===
In 1990, Ramanna was made Union minister of State for defence in the V. P. Singh administration, but the government collapsed a short while later. Later in his career, Ramanna advocated for strict policies to prevent nuclear proliferation and argued against further nuclear testing. He held various academic positions including the chairman of board of Governors at IIT Bombay, chairman of the governing council at Indian Institute of Science and founder director of National Institute of Advanced Studies, Bangalore. He was a nominated member of the Rajya Sabha, the upper house of the Indian Parliament from 1997 to 2003.

== Death ==
Ramanna died on 23 September 2004 at the age of 79 due to gastronomical issues. Then President of India A. P. J. Abdul Kalam said, "The passing away of Dr. Ramanna is a deep personal loss for me as he was a mentor, guide and teacher to me over the years. A towering and multi-faceted personality Dr. Ramanna was always keen to contribute to national development with a sense of mission in any capacity, which was evident in his role as a Union Minister and a Member of Parliament. For us in the science and technology community, he was always a source of inspiration and a guide." P. K. Iyengar wrote "more important legacy is his uncompromising belief in intellectual clarity and rational thinking in every facet of life, and his unwavering belief (which he inherited from Jawaharlal Nehru and Homi Bhabha) that the nation could progress only by embracing science and scientific thinking. The best way to honour his memory is not through eulogies, but by rededicating ourselves to his policies and belief."

== Personal life ==
Ramanna had a keen interest in music and trained as a musician. He played musical instruments such as the piano. In 1952, he married Malathi and the couple had three children, two daughters and a son. He was one of the survivors of the Air India Flight 403 that crashed in 1982.

== Positions held ==
- Director, Bhabha Atomic Research Centre (1972–78, 1981–83)
- Chairman, Board of Governors, Indian Institute of Technology, Bombay (1972–78)
- Vice-president, Indian Academy of Sciences (1977–79)
- President, Indian National Science Academy (1977–78)
- Secretary for Defence Research, Government of India (1978–81)
- Scientific Adviser to the Minister of Defence (1978–81)
- Director-general, Defence Research and Development Organisation (1978–82)
- Chairman, Atomic Energy Commission (1983–87)
- President, General Conference of International Atomic Energy Agency (1986)
- Secretary, Department of Atomic Energy (1983–87)
- Minister of state for defence (1990)
- Member of Parliament, Rajya Sabha (1997–2003)
- Founder-Director, National Institute of Advanced Studies (1988–89, 1990–97)

== Awards and honors ==
Ramanna was awarded multiple honorary doctorates by various universities. His major awards include:

- Shanti Swarup Bhatnagar Prize for Science and Technology (1963)
- Padma Shri (1968)
- Padma Bhushan (1973)
- Padma Vibhushan (1975)
- Meghnad Saha Medal (1984)
- R. D. Birla Memorial Award (1985–86)
- Asutosh Mookerjee Gold Medal (1996)

== Books ==
Ramanna has authored two books:

- Years of Pilgrimage (Autobiography) (1991)
- The Structure of Music in Raga and Western Systems (1993)

Government offices
Preceded by Homi Sethna	Director, Bhabha Atomic Research Centre; 1972 - 1978	Succeeded by P. K. Iyengar
Preceded by M. G. K. Menon	Director General, Defence Research and Development Organisation; 1978 - 1982	Succeeded by V. S. R. Arunachalam
Preceded by Homi Sethna	Chairman, Atomic Energy Commission of India; 1983 - 1987	Succeeded by M. R. Srinivasan
Political offices
Preceded by Dumar Lal Baitha	Minister of State for Defence; 1990 - 1990	Succeeded by Lalit Vijay Singh
