= Sekhar Basu =

Indian nuclear scientist (1952–2020)

Dr. Sekhar Basu
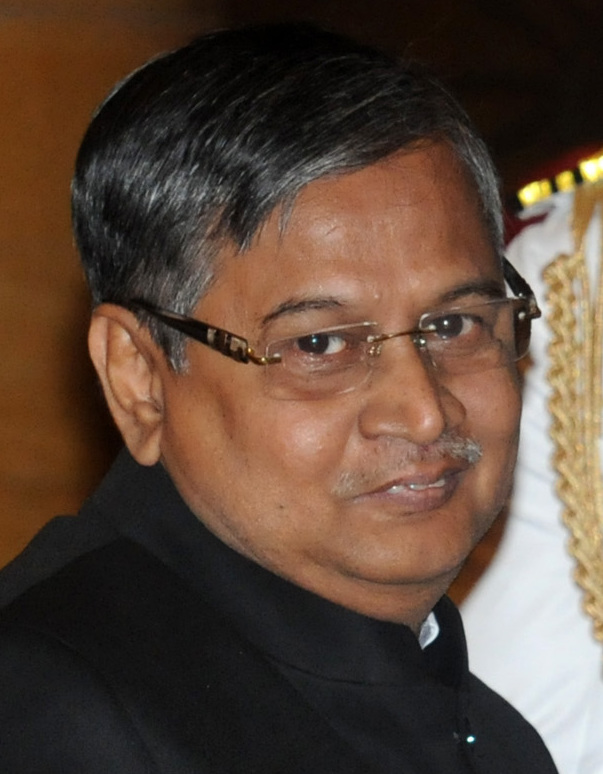

Chairman Atomic Energy Commission and Secretary Department of Atomic Energy
- In office 23 October 2015 – 17 September 2018
- Preceded by: Dr. Ratan Kumar Sinha
- Succeeded by: Kamlesh Nilkanth Vyas

Director of the Bhabha Atomic Research Centre
- In office 19 June 2012 – 23 February 2016

Personal details
- Born: 20 September 1952 Muzaffarpur, Bihar, India
- Died: 24 September 2020 (aged 68) Kolkata, West Bengal, India
- Education: Ballygunge Government High School; Veermata Jijabai Technological Institute, Mumbai BARC Training School
- Profession: Nuclear scientist
- Awards: Padma Shri (2014); Indian Nuclear Society (INS) Award (2002); Department of Atomic Energy (DAE) Award (2006 and 2007)

Dr. Sekhar Basu (20 September 1952 – 24 September 2020) was an Indian nuclear scientist who served as the chairman of the Atomic Energy Commission and Secretary to the Government of India, Department of Atomic Energy (DAE). He also served as the Director of Bhabha Atomic Research Centre (BARC), the Project Director of Nuclear Submarine Program, and later as the Chief Executive of the Nuclear Recycle Board at Bhabha Atomic Research Center. He was a recipient of India's fourth highest civilian honor Padma Shri in 2014.

He is credited for his efforts in building the nuclear reactor for India's first nuclear powered submarine INS Arihant, nuclear waste recycling plants in Tarapur and Kalpakkam, and the Indian Neutrino Observatory in Theni, Tamil Nadu.

== Education and career ==
Basu was born on 20 September 1952 in Muzaffarpur, in the Indian state of Bihar. He attended Ballygunge Government High School, Kolkata, and graduated in mechanical engineering from Veermata Jijabai Technological Institute, University of Mumbai in 1974.

After completion of a year at the Bhabha Atomic Research Centre's training school, he joined the Reactor Engineering Division in the same institute in 1975. He went on to work as a project director of the Nuclear Submarine program and as the chief executive of the Nuclear Recycle Board at BARC India.

He further went on to become the Director of the Bhabha Atomic Research Centre in 2012 and was appointed the chairman of the Indian Atomic Energy Commission and Secretary to the Government of India, Department of Atomic Energy (DAE) in 2015, and served in this position through September 2018.

== Projects ==
=== Nuclear recycle plants ===
In his role as the Chief Executive of the Nuclear Recycle Board, at BARC, Basu's research spanned design, development, and operation of nuclear reprocessing and nuclear waste management. He was involved in the design and building of reprocessing plants, fuel storage facilities, and nuclear waste treatment facilities at Trombay, Maharashtra, Tarapur, Maharashtra, and Kalpakkam, Tamil Nadu.

=== Nuclear power deployment ===
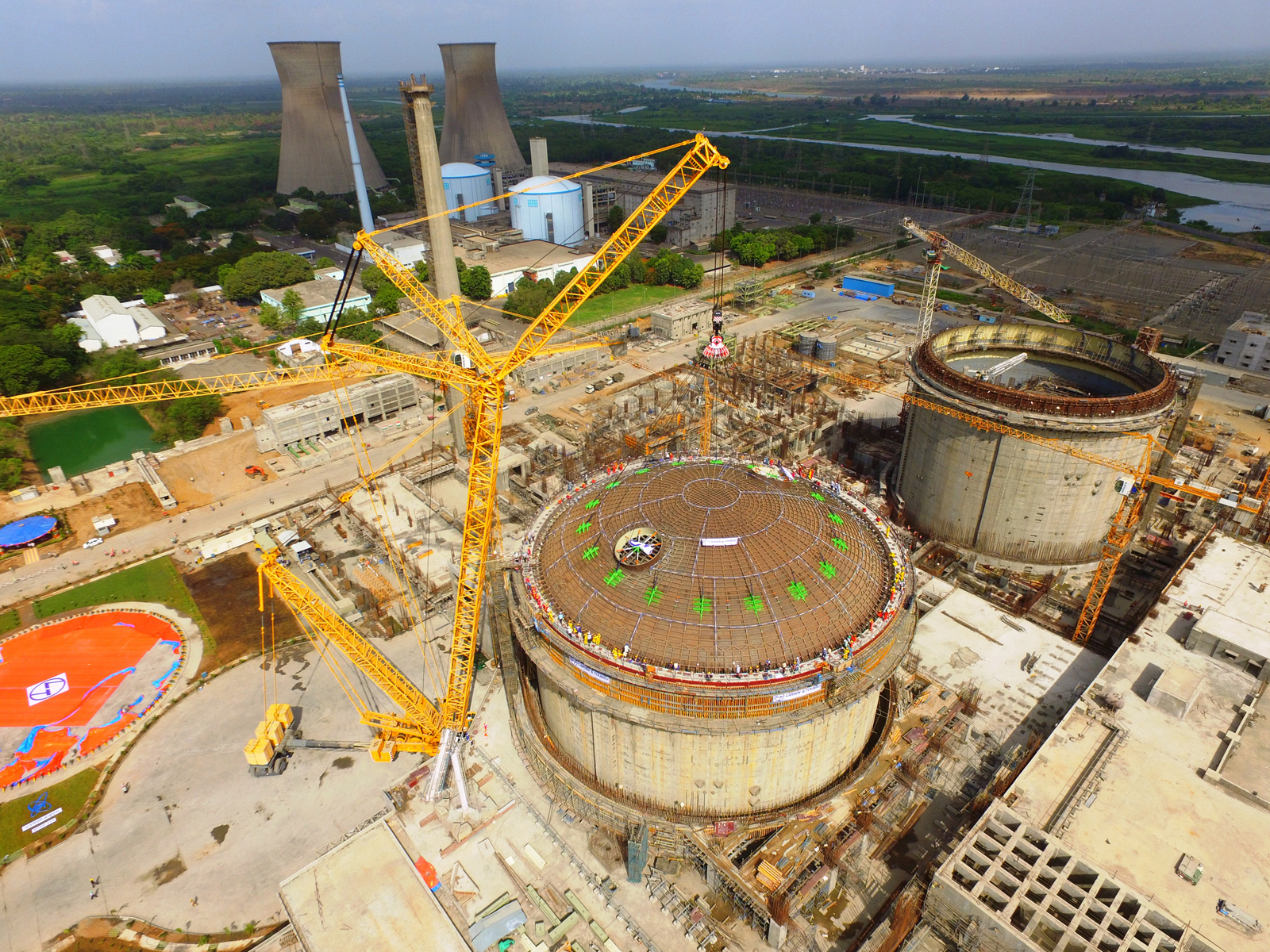
Pressurized Heavy Water Reactor (PHWR) construction in Kakrapur, Gujarat, during Basu's term as the secretary at the DAE.

As the secretary of the Department of Atomic Energy (DAE) between 2015 and 2018, Basu supported initiatives to accelerate the pace of nuclear power deployment in India. In May 2017, the Government of India gave its approval to DAE's plan for construction of 10 pressurized heavy-water reactors (PHWRs) and two pressurized water reactors (PWRs). In this period, the DAE took pm simultaneous construction of 21 reactors, with the Prototype Fast Breeder Reactor (PFBR) at Kalpakkam being in advanced stages of commissioning. In this period, DAE also initiated actions for increased uranium exploration and mining in India.

He also oversaw the launch of various projects at the Department of Atomic Energy, including the commercial power production of the second 1000MWe nuclear reactor at Kudankulam Nuclear Power Plant, and construction of two further nuclear power plants, KKNPP Units 3 and 4, of the same capacity, starting in June 2017.

=== Fundamental science projects ===
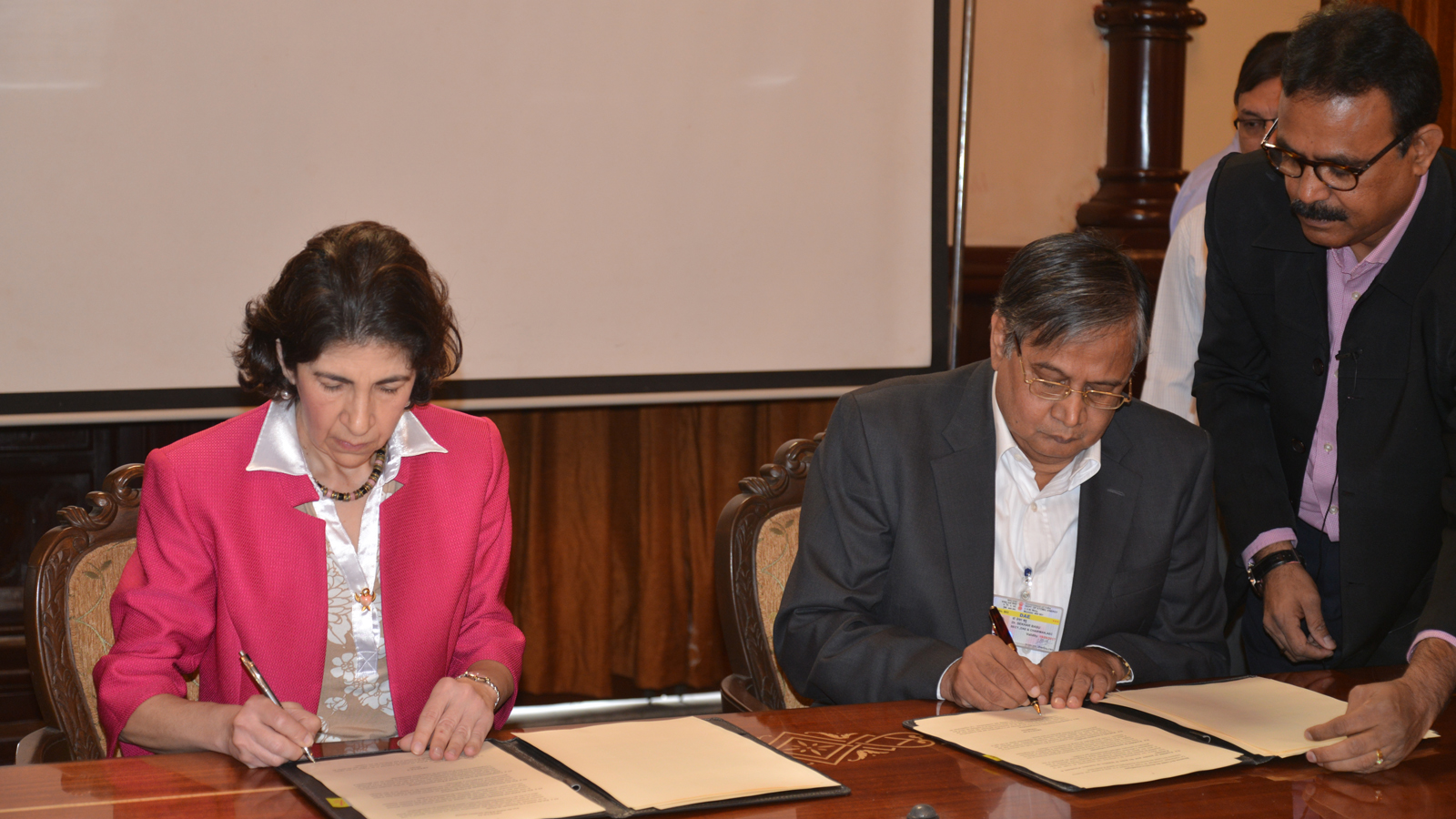
Dr. Basu signing the 2016 agreement for India to be an associate member of the European Organization for Nuclear Research (CERN)

His fundamental science research and partnerships spanned Superconducting Accelerators, Laser Interferometer Gravitational wave Observatory (LIGO), International Thermonuclear Experimental Reactor (ITER), and the India-based Neutrino Observatory.

In his role as the Secretary of the Department of Atomic Energy, he signed a Memorandum of understanding (MoU) with the National Science Foundation in 2016, to establish an advanced Gravitational wave detector in India. When completed, the Indian Initiative in Gravitational-wave Observations or INDIGO will be the fifth large scale gravitational wave detector in the world, and the third LIGO detector in the world after LIGO US, and VIRGO gravitational wave detector in Italy. A site near Aundha Nagnath in the Hingoli District, Maharashtra has been selected, with a predicted date of commission in 2024.

In November 2016, during his tenure at the DAE, he signed an agreement for India to be an associate member of the European Organization for Nuclear Research (CERN). The agreement would allow Indian companies to bid for engineering contracts at the CERN, and would also allow for Indian engineers to participate in projects at the CERN.

He also signed a MoU in April 2018, with the then US energy secretary Rick Perry to expand collaboration between India and the US in neutrino research paving the way for collaboration between the Long Baseline Neutrino Facility (LBNF), Deep Underground Neutrino Experiment (DUNE) in the US, and the India-based Neutrino Observatory (INO) in Theni, India. The MoU built on the previous agreement between the two countries to collaborate on the manufacture of particle accelerator components.

=== Healthcare and societal outreach ===
During his time at the DAE, the agency drove initiatives to develop radiotherapy equipment and low cost radiotherapy treatment for developing countries. Bhabhatron, a low cost radiotherapy machine and a digital simulator was shared with Tanzania, Kenya, and Mongolia. Efforts were also undertaken for the development of indigenous cancer care drugs.

In this period, he also coordinated with the Government of India's Startup India Skill India program, to provide spin-off technologies available for entrepreneurs to use.

== Awards and honours ==
- Indian Nuclear Society Award (2002)
- DAE Awards (2006 and 2007)
- Padma Shri, Government of India (2014)

He was also a Fellow of the Indian National Academy of Engineering (INAE) and the Indian Society for Non-Destructive Testing (ISNT).

== Death ==
Basu died from COVID-19 in Kolkata on 24 September 2020, four days after his 68th birthday, during the COVID-19 pandemic in India. He was also suffering from kidney ailments at the time of his death.

== See also ==
- Arihant-class submarine
- Bharatiya Nabhikiya Vidyut Nigam
- India-based Neutrino Observatory
- Nuclear Power Corporation of India
