= V. S. Ramamurthy =

Indian nuclear physicist (born 1942)

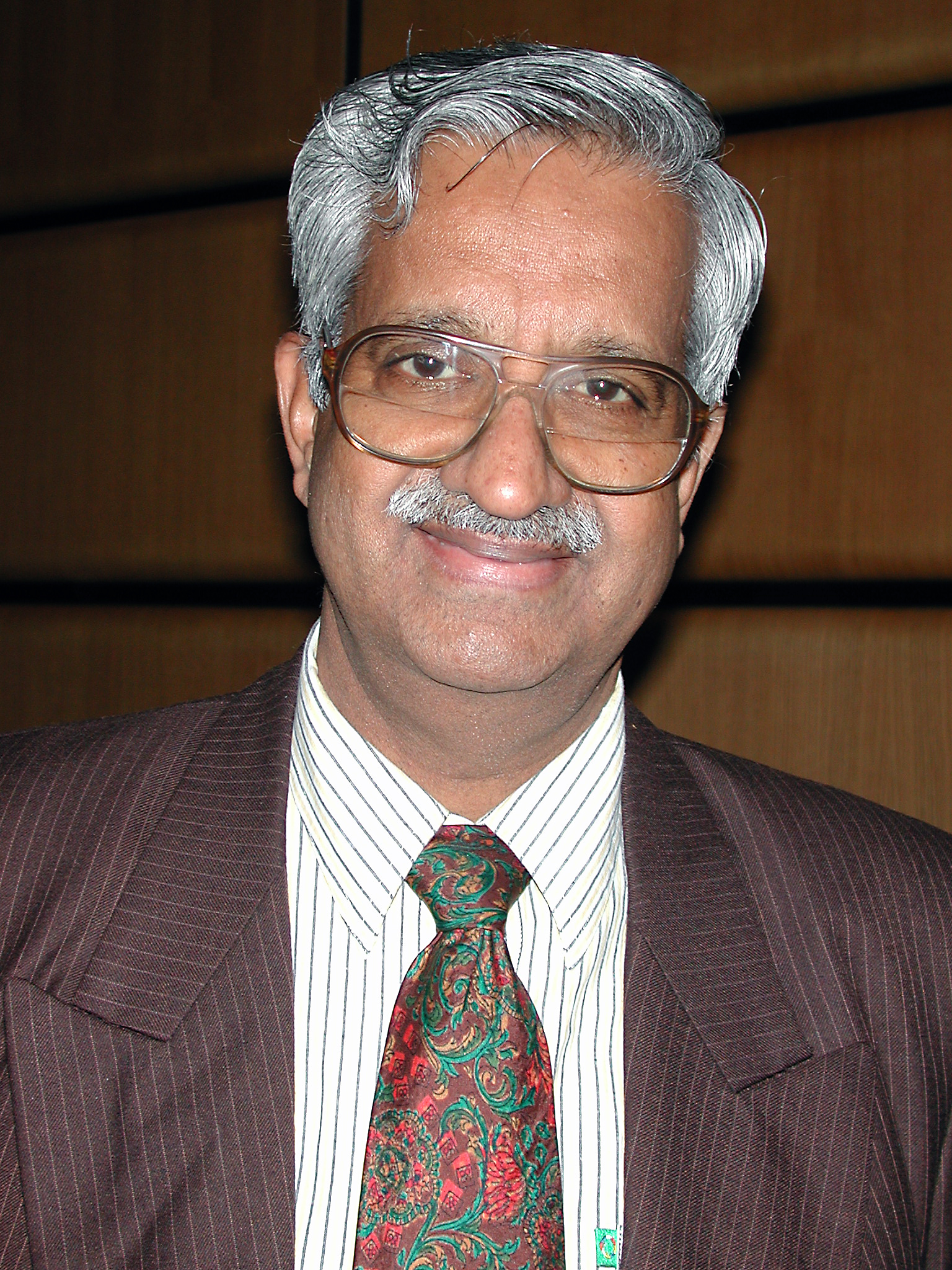
- Born: 2 April 1942 (age 84); Madras Presidency, British India
- Occupation: Nuclear physicist
- Years active: Since 1963
- Awards: Padma Bhushan

Valangiman Subramanian Ramamurthy (born 2 April 1942) is an Indian nuclear physicist with a broad range of contributions from basic research to Science and Engineering administration.Prof.Ramamurthy started his career in Bhabha Atomic Research Centre, Mumbai in the year 1963. He made important research contributions in the area of nuclear fission, medium energy heavy ion reactions, statistical and thermodynamic properties of nuclei and low energy accelerator applications. During the period 1995-2006, Prof.Ramamurthy was fully involved in Science administration as Secretary to Government of India, Department of Science and Technology, (DST), New Delhi.Other important assignments held by him include Director, Institute of Physics, Bhubaneswar, (1989-1995), DAE Homi Bhabha Chair in the Inter-University Accelerator Centre, New Delhi (2006-2010), and Director of the National Institute of Advanced Studies, Bengaluru (2009-2014). He is a former chairman of the Recruitment and Assessment Board of the Council of Scientific and Industrial Research and has served as a member of the design team of the first Indian nuclear experiment in Pokhran on 18 May 1974. The Government of India awarded him the third highest Indian civilian honour of Padma Bhushan in 2005.

== Biography ==
Born on 2 April 1942 in the part of Madras Presidency that is now the south Indian state of Tamil Nadu, Ramamurthy secured his graduate and master's degrees in Physics from the University of Madras and joined the training school of the Atomic Energy Establishment, Trombay, (present day Bhabha Atomic Research Centre) in 1963 for advanced training. He continued at the institution to start his career where he stayed till 1989 during which period he secured a doctoral degree (PhD) in 1971 from the University of Mumbai for his thesis on stochastic theory of fragment mass and charge distributions in low energy fission.

In 1989, he moved to the Institute of Physics, Bhubaneswar as the director, a post he held till 1995. The Government of India appointed him in 1995 as the Secretary at the Department of Science and Technology (DST) where he worked till his superannuation in 2006. Thereafter, he held the Homi Bhabha chair at the Inter-University Accelerator Centre, New Delhi till 2009 when he took up the post of the director at the National Institute of Advanced Studies, Bengaluru. On his retirement in 2014, he was made the Emeritus Professor of the institute. He was also associated with the Recruitment and Assessment Board of the Council of Scientific and Industrial Research as the chairman and chaired the standing advisory group on nuclear applications of the International Atomic Energy Agency (IAEA).

== Legacy and achievements ==
Ramamurthy was a member of the team which designed the Smiling Buddha project for carrying out the first Indian nuclear experiment at Pokhran on 18 May 1974. During his stint as the director of the Institute of Physics, he was the leader of the atomic and molecular clusters and low energy accelerator project and contributed to the setting up of the 3 MV accelerator centre at the institute. He was also involved in the high energy nuclear physics programme using the heavy ion accelerators at the European Organization for Nuclear Research (CERN) in Geneva. His researches covered the theoretical and experimental aspects of Nuclear fission physics and he is credited with advanced research on nuclear shell effects, nuclear level densities and pre-equilibrium fission and sub-barrier fusion dynamics. His researches have been documented by way of several articles published in peer reviewed journals and a book, Nuclear Radiation Detectors, released in 1986. He has also written on the sociological aspects of science and technology.

Selected Bibliography

- S. S. Kapoor; V. S. Ramamurthy (1986). Nuclear Radiation Detectors. New Age International. p. 236. ISBN 9780852264966.
- S. K. Kataria; V. S. Ramamurthy & S. S. Kapoor (July 1978). "Semiempirical nuclear level density formula with shell effects". Phys. Rev. C. 19 (1): 549–563. Bibcode:1978PhRvC..18..549K. doi:10.1103/PhysRevC.18.549.
- V.S. Ramamurthy; S.S. Kapoor (December 1972). "Statistical properties of excited nuclei and the determination of the ground-state shell correction energies". Physics Letters B. 42 (4): 399–403. Bibcode:1972PhLB...42..399R. doi:10.1016/0370-2693(72)90091-3.
- Saurabh Kumar; V. S. Ramamurthy (March 2015). "Pedal Power as the 21st Century Charkha". The Pioneer.

== Awards and honours ==
Ramamurthy is an elected fellow of the Indian National Science Academy (1987) and has served on its council for many years. He is also an elected member of the Indian Academy of Sciences, (1991) the National Academy of Sciences, India and the Indian National Academy of Engineering. He is a fellow of the World Academy of Sciences and a foreign member of the Russian Academy of Natural Sciences. The Government of India awarded him the third highest Indian civilian award of Padma Bhushan in 2005.

== See also ==
- Smiling Buddha
- International Atomic Energy Agency
- European Organization for Nuclear Research
- Institute of Physics, Bhubaneswar
- National Institute of Advanced Studies
- Department of Science and Technology
