= Ajit Kumar Mohanty =

Indian physicist

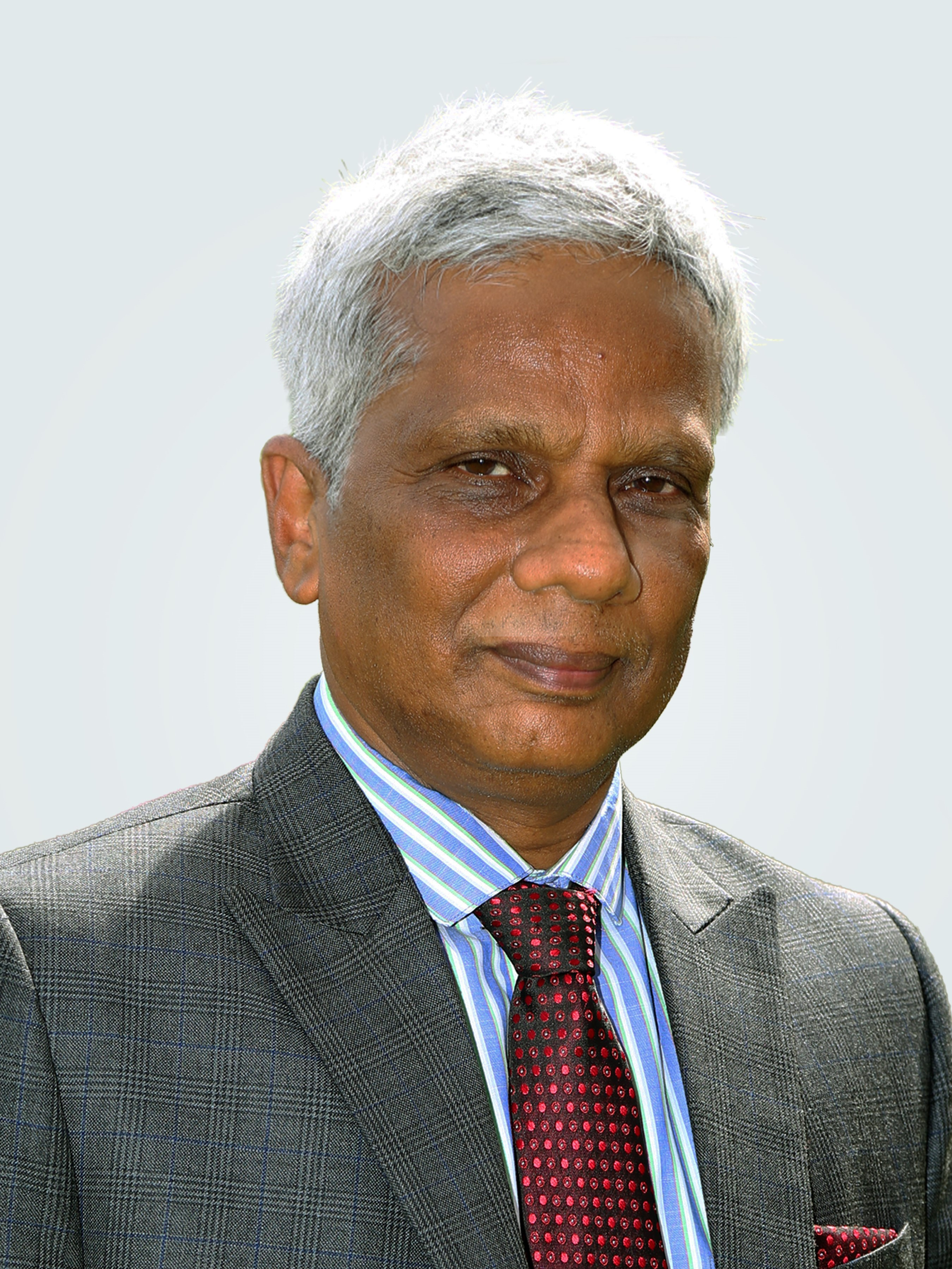

Secretary to the Government of India, Department of Atomic Energy (DAE) and Chairman of the Atomic Energy Commission of India
- Incumbent
- Assumed office 3 May 2023
- Preceded by: Kamlesh Nilkanth Vyas

Director of the Bhabha Atomic Research Centre
- In office 12 March 2019 – 15 September 2023
- Preceded by: Kamlesh Nilkanth Vyas
- Succeeded by: Vivek Bhasin

Personal details
- Born: 11 October 1959 (age 67) mayurbhanj,Odisha, India
- Education: University of Mumbai

Ajit Kumar Mohanty (born 11 October 1959) is an Indian nuclear physicist currently serving as Secretary to the Government of India, Department of Atomic Energy (DAE) and Chairman of the Atomic Energy Commission of India. Previously, he served as the Director of the Bhabha Atomic Research Centre (BARC) from March 2019 till September 2023.

He has made contributions to several areas of nuclear physics covering collision energy from the sub-Coulomb barrier to the relativistic regime using the Pelletron accelerator at Tata Institute of Fundamental Research (TIFR), PHENIX, and CMS experiments at Brookhaven National Laboratory (BNL), USA and CERN, Geneva.

He held several honorary positions at various organizations. He served the Indian Physics Association (IPA) as General Secretary and later as its president. He had been the Spokesperson for India-CMS collaboration, Director, Saha Institute of Nuclear Physics, and Director, Physics Group, BARC. He has twice been the CERN Scientific Associate, first during 2002-2004 and again during 2010–2011.

== Education and career ==
He completed his undergraduate studies in 1979, earning a degree with Honours in Physics from MPC College of Baripada. He pursued his postgraduate studies at Ravenshaw College, Cuttack in 1981. He joined the Nuclear Physics Division at the Bhabha Atomic Research Centre (BARC) in 1983. He later obtained his doctorate from Mumbai University. As of September 2024, he has h-index of 227 and have more than 243,000 citations.

== Awards ==
He received the Young Physicist Award from the Indian Physical Society in 1988, the Indian National Science Academy Young Scientist Award in 1991, and the Homi Bhabha Science and Technology Award from the Department of Atomic Energy in 2001. In 2021, he was conferred an Honorary Doctorate of Literature (D.Litt.) Honoris Causa by Utkal University. He is a fellow of National Academy of Sciences and Indian National Academy of Engineering of India.
