= Sharada Srinivasan =

Indian archaeologist

- Born: 16 January 1966 (age 60)
- Education: (PhD, 1996) (M.A. Art, Archaeology, and Archaeometallurgy, 1990) (BTech Engineering Physics, 1987)
- Alma mater: University of London, School of Oriental and African Studies, London, Indian Institute of Technology, Bombay
- Occupations: Professor, National Institute of Advanced Studies(NIAS), Bangalore
- Known for: Contributions in the field of Applications of scientific studies in art and Archaeology, Indian Classical Dance
- Spouse: Digvijay Mallah
- Parent: M.R.Srinivasan; and Geetha Srinivasan
- Awards: Padma Shri (2019)
- Website: http://www.sharadasrinivasan.com/ https://www.nias.res.in/professor/sharada-srinivasan

Sharada Srinivasan FRAS FAAAS (born 16 January 1966) is an archaeologist specializing in the scientific study of art, archaeology, archaeometallurgy and culture. She is a professor at the National Institute of Advanced Studies, Bangalore, India, and an Honorary University Fellow at the University of Exeter, UK. Srinivasan is also an exponent of classical Bharatanatyam dance. She was awarded India's fourth highest civilian award the Padma Shri in 2019. She is a member of the Calamur family.

== Early life and education ==
The younger of two siblings, Srinivasan was born on 16 January 1966 in Bangalore to M. R. Srinivasan and Geetha Srinivasan. Her father is an Indian nuclear scientist and mechanical engineer and her mother is nature conservationist and a wildlife activist. Sharada received her Higher Secondary Certificate from Jai Hind College, Mumbai in 1983 and obtained her BTech from the Indian Institute of Technology, Bombay in 1987. In 1986, Sharada along with four IIT batchmates co-directed, acted in and choreographed for the English feature film, Nuclear Winter, which won the Cannes Award in the Special Category for 1988. The movie was produced by Homi Sethna and directed by Zul Vellani. The starcast included Vijay Crishna and Mishu Vellani. The movie was shot in the IIT Powai campus and marked the launch of a successful dance career for Sharada. After completing her master's degree at the University of London in 1989, she continued to research South Indian bronze sculptures during her PhD at University College London, which she completed in 1996.

== Career ==
Sharada Srinivasan is a professor in the Programme of Heritage and Society in the School of Humanities at the National Institute of Advanced Studies (NIAS), Bangalore, India since 2012. Srinivasan started her journey as NIAS as a Fellow (2004–2006), became assistant professor in 2006 and served in the role till 2012.

She is first author of the book 'India's Legendary Wootz Steel: An advanced material of the ancient world'. Prof. Sharada Srinivasan is a Fellow of the Royal Asiatic Society of Great Britain and World Academy of Art and Science, and a Fellow of the American Academy of Arts and Sciences.

Srinivasan was awarded a Homi Bhabha Fellowship, during which time she visited the UK and USA as a visiting scholar at the Smithsonian, the Conservation Analytical Laboratory, Museum of Applied Sciences Centre for Archaeology (MASCA), University of Pennsylvania, Conservation Analytical Laboratory, Smithsonian & Conservation Department, Freer & Sackler Galleries, Smithsonian, and presented papers at a Conference on Indus Archaeology, University of Wisconsin Madison and The Cost Committee Meeting on Ion Beam analysis in Art and Archaeology at Oxford organised by European Commission.

She was co-recipient (with Exeter University) of a British Council-funded UKEIRI research awards (2009–2011), of a Royal Society-DST award, as well as an ongoing UKIERI-II Award related to developing joint PhD. Programmes in intangible histories including archaeology and performance studies.

In 2009, Srinivasan co-chaired the seventh Beginning of the Use of Metals and Alloys (BUMA) international conference in Bangalore. The proceedings were published in 2015 in the volume Metals and Civilizations, of which Srinivasan was co-editor.

Srinivasan was co-investigator on a 2010 UK India Education and Research Initiative (UKIERI) funded project with S. Ranganathan and the University of Exeter's Gill Juleff. The project was titled Pioneering Metallurgy: Origins of Steel Making in the Southern Indian Subcontinent. She undertook further research on technical evidence for high-carbon steel by ancient crucible processes and ancient high-tin Bronzes and the surviving groups in Kerala for manufacture of high-tin bronze vessels and mirrors and lost wax casting. Sharada was featured on the site Trowel Blazers of University College London on women archaeologists in 2020.

== Dance ==
Srinivasan curated the International Year of Astronomy photo-montage exhibition 'Danse e-Toile: Nataraja et le Cosmos' at Alliance Française de Bangalore. It explores cosmic sensibilities and the art, metallurgy and science of the Nataraja bronze and from the evocative lens of both the Bharatanatyam and French contemporary dance forms. It was displayed at Cité De L'Espace, Toulouse for the Festival La Novela as a prelude to a streaming dance event between Srinivasan and K. Danse, France.

She is also a performing artist specialising in the South Indian classical dance of Bharatanatyam. She has performed and lectured at the Royal Asiatic Society, the Royal Academy of Arts, for the Chola exhibition, the International Academy of Astronautics, the International Centre for Theoretical Physics, Trieste, INTACH-Belgium, Nehru Centre, London, China Conservatory of Music, National History of Science Seminar, Hyderabad, University of Toyoma, Japan and others. She had a photo-exhibition in June 2008 at Alliance Française Bangalore entitled 'Cosmic Dance of Shiva' on art-science-dance perspectives related to South Indian bronzes and the Nataraja.

Sharada Srinivasan was conferred with the Dr. Kalpana Chawla State Award for Women Scientists 2011 instituted by the Government of Karnataka.

== Honors ==
- Dr. Kalpana Chawla State Award for Women Scientists 2011.
- Chairperson, Regional Sessions, Indian subcontinent, World of Iron Conference, London; 16–20 February 2009
- 'Les pierre chantantes' 28 Feb 2009, a classical south Indian dance performance and talk on the theme of the stone 'musical' pillars in some south Indian temples such as Hampi and the scientific and artistic aspects by Sharada Srinivasan in Habère-Poche, France.
- Materials Research Society of India Medal 2006
- Malti B. Nagar Ethnoarchaeology Award
- Indian representative for project for UNESCO Chair in History of Science
- Member, International Committee, Conference of Beginning of the Use of Metals and Alloys
- Junior Research Fellow, Ministry of Culture (1999–2000)
- Forbes Fellowship 1999
- Post-Doctoral Smithsonian Fellowship ( April 1999– September 1999)
- Materials Research Society Graduate Student Award 1996
- Homi Bhabha Fellowship (1996–98)
- Petrie Award (1989)
- JN Tata Endowment(1988)

== Quotes ==
- ...Talking about cosmic dance she said: "It is a metaphor of movement. There is also a personal metaphor – creation emerging out of destruction. I use the dance of the cosmos or the dance of science to discover aspects of ancient art that art historians have not been able to find ..
- ...There are fascinating interfaces between art and science. I returned to dance because of science. Dance injects an element of normalcy where I can enjoy contact with human emotions while science has an alienating quality. Bharatanatya is liberating and constricting at the same time because of its set forms and structure. I would have found it very limiting had it not been for science. Now I see the dance form as an element of movement of art forms..
- ...Capra was certainly not the first in portraying the Nataraja as a universal metaphor for the interface between science, spirituality, dance and art. But he definitely helped the idea to catch on.
- ...There is also something a bit Jungian in the Nataraja imagery that it somehow holds out a positive message of hope for coming to terms with loss through artistic endeavours or through acts of dedication.
