= Pranab R. Dastidar =

Indian electronics engineer (1933–2022)

Pranab R. Dastidar FIAS
- Born: 10 July 1933
- Died: 11 February 2022 (aged 88); California, USA
- Known for: Indian nuclear programme, team leader of Electronic Detonation System and Smiling Buddha project and press the trigger button of India's first Nuclear test, Design and development of INS Arihant
- Awards: Padma Shree (1975)
- Scientific career
- Fields: Electronics, Nuclear Physics
- Institutions: Director at Bhabha Atomic Research Center

Pranab Rebatiranjan Dastidar (10 July 1933 – 11 February 2022) was an Indian electronics engineer and nuclear physicist. He was a director of Bhabha Atomic Research Center. Dastidar led the Electronic Detonation System in Smiling Buddha project, India's first ever nuclear bomb test. He received Padma Shri in 1975. He died in California on 11 February 2022.
