= Air India Flight 403 =

1982 aviation accident in India

Coordinates: 19.089°N 72.870°E

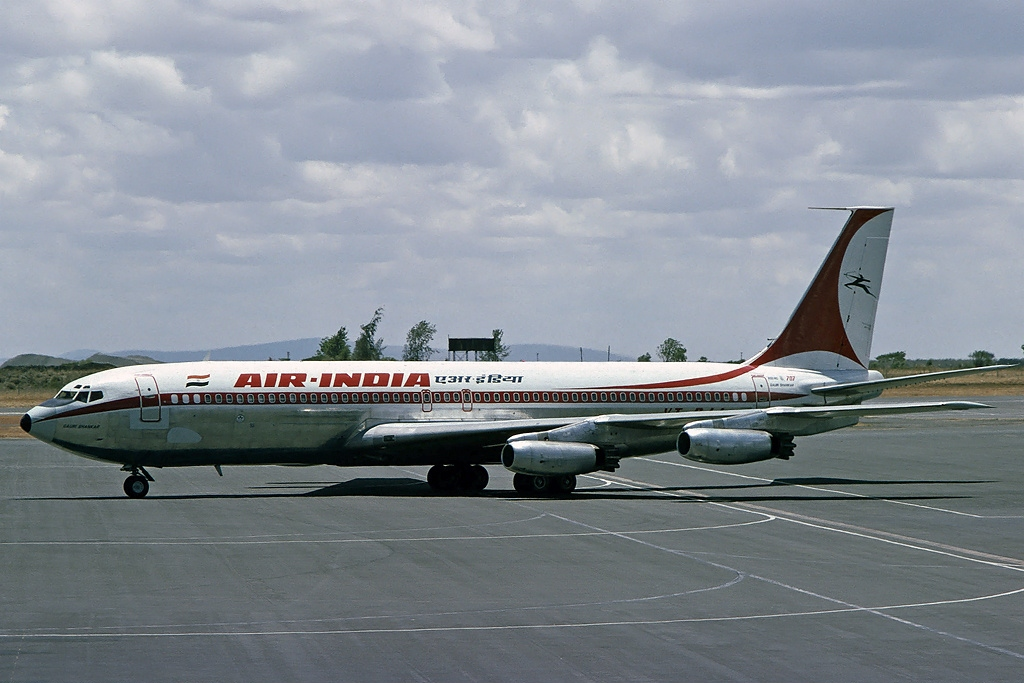
- VT-DJJ, the aircraft involved in the accident, seen in February 1976

Accident
- Date: 21 June 1982
- Summary: Pilot error; inclement weather as a contributing factor
- Site: Sahar International Airport, Mumbai, India

Aircraft
- Aircraft type: Boeing 707–437
- Aircraft name: Gauri Shankar
- Operator: Air India
- IATA flight No.: AI403
- ICAO flight No.: AIC403
- Call sign: AIRINDIA 403
- Registration: VT-DJJ
- Flight origin: Subang International Airport, Kuala Lumpur, Malaysia
- Destination: Sahar International Airport, Bombay
- Occupants: 111
- Passengers: 99
- Crew: 12
- Fatalities: 17
- Injuries: 25
- Survivors: 94

Air India Flight 403 was a scheduled Air India passenger flight operated by a Boeing 707 that crashed at Sahar International Airport in Bombay, India, on 21 June 1982. It was likely caused by miscalculated altitude in a heavy rainstorm.

== Aircraft ==
The aircraft involved was a Boeing 707-437 registered VT-DJJ and named Gauri Shankar after the mountain. It was the first jetliner inducted into the fleet of an Asian airline, manufactured by Boeing Commercial Airplanes in 1960 and powered by four Rolls-Royce Conway 508 engines.

== Accident ==
On 21 June 1982, Flight 403 crashed after a botched go-around during a rainstorm. Out of 111 occupants on the aircraft, 2 of 12 crew members and 15 of 99 passengers were killed. One of the survivors was Raja Ramanna, an Indian nuclear physicist.

== Investigation ==
An Indian public inquiry determined the probable cause of the accident to be "Deliberate reduction of engine power by the pilot 12 seconds prior to first impact due to altitude unawareness resulting in a high rate of descent, very heavy landing and the undershooting of the aircraft by 1300 feet."
