= Shadakshari Settar =

Indian professor and scholar (1935–2020)

Shadakshari Settar (11 December 1935 – 28 February 2020) was an Indian professor and scholar who had conducted research in the fields of Indian archaeology, art-history, history of religions and philosophy as well as classical literature.

== Early life and education ==
Settar studied in Mysuru, Dharawad, and Cambridge University.

== Career ==
- Professor of History and Archaeology, Karnataka University in Dharwad (1960s)
- Director, of the National Museum Institute of the History of Art, Conservation and Museology (1978).
- President, Indian Council of Historical Research (1996).
- Dr S Radhakrishnan Chair at the NIAS (2002–2010), Bengaluru, India, later became professor emeritus.
- Honorary Director of the Southern Centre of the Indira Gandhi National Centre for the Arts (2005).
- Visiting professor at various foreign universities including at Cambridge, Harvard, Heidelberg, Athens, Leiden.

== Works ==
Works under Settar's personal authorship comprise four volumes on history of art, two on religion and philosophy, one on human civilization and four on historiography.

=== Books (In Kannada) ===
- shravanabelagola (ಶ್ರವಣಬೆಳಗೊಳ (೧೯೮೧),ಅಭಿನವ ಬೆಂಗಳೂರು)
- Savige ahvana (ಸಾವಿಗೆ ಆಹ್ವಾನ (೨೦೦೪,೨೦೧೪)ಅಭಿನವ ಬೆಂಗಳೂರು)
- Shangam Tamilagam Mattu Kannada Nadunudi(ಶಂಗಂ ತಮಿಳಗಂ ಮತ್ತು ಕನ್ನಡ ನಾಡು-ನುಡಿ (೨೦೦೭)ಅಭಿನವ ಬೆಂಗಳೂರು)
- somanathapura(ಸೋಮನಾಥಪುರ (೨೦೦೮)ಅಭಿನವ ಬೆಂಗಳೂರು)
- Badami chalukyara shasana sahithya(ಬಾದಾಮಿ ಚಾಳುಕ್ಯರ ಶಾಸನ ಸಾಹಿತ್ಯ (೨೦೧೨)ಅಭಿನವ ಬೆಂಗಳೂರು)
- Savannu arasi (ಸಾವನ್ನು ಅರಸಿ(೨೦೧೪)ಅಭಿನವ ಬೆಂಗಳೂರು)
- Haalagannada: Lipi, Lipikara and Lipi Vyavasaya)ಹಳಗನ್ನಡ- ಲಿಪಿ, ಲಿಪಿಕಾರ, ಲಿಪಿ ವ್ಯವಸಾಯ (೨೦೧೪)
- Halagannada Bhashe bhasha vikasa bhasha bandavya (ಹಳಗನ್ನಡ-ಭಾಷೆ, ಭಾಷಾ ವಿಕಾಸ ಮತ್ತು ಭಾಷಾ ಬಾಂಧವ್ಯ(೨೦೧೫)ಅಭಿನವ ಬೆಂಗಳೂರು)
- Prakrutha jagadvalaya (ಪ್ರಾಕೃತ ಜಗದ್ವಲಯ(೨೦೧೮)ಅಭಿನವ ಬೆಂಗಳೂರು)
- Ruvari (ರೂವಾರಿ (ಕನ್ನಡ ನಾಡಿನ ವಾಸ್ತು ಮತ್ತು ಶಿಲ್ಪಿಗಳ ಚರಿತ್ರೆ)(೨೦೧೮)ಅಭಿನವ ಬೆಂಗಳೂರು)

=== Books (English) ===
- Hoysala Sculpture in the National Museum, Copenhagen (1975)
- Sravana Belagola - An illustrated study, Dharwad (1981)
- Inviting Death, Historical Experiment on Sepulchar Hill, Dharwad (1986)
- Inviting Death: Indian Attitude Towards the Ritual Death (Leiden:E. J.Brill, 1989)
- Pursuing Death: Philosophy and Practice of Voluntary Termination of Life, Dharwad (1990)
- Hampi - A Medieval Metropolis, Bangalore (1990)
- Hoysala temples, Vol I, II, Bangalore (1991)
- Footprints of Artisans in History, Mysore (2003)
- Somanathapura, Bangalore (2008)
- Akssarameru's Kaliyuga Vipartan, Bangalore (2011)

=== Edited volumes ===
- Archaeological Survey of Mysore: Annual Reports, Vol II-IV, Dharwad (1976–77)
- Memorial Stones: A Study of the origin, significance and variety, Dharwad-Heidelberg (1982)
- Indian Archaeology in Retrospect, Vol I-IV, New Delhi (2002)
- Construction of Indian Railways, Vol I-III, New Delhi (1999)
- Jalianwala Bagh massacre, New Delhi (2000)
- Pangs of Partition, Vol I-II, New Delhi (2002)

== Awards ==
In 2008 Settar was presented with the Sham.Ba. Joshi Award for his contributions to historical research.
