= Alfred Woodley Croft =

British educationist and administrator

Sir Alfred Woodley Croft KCIE
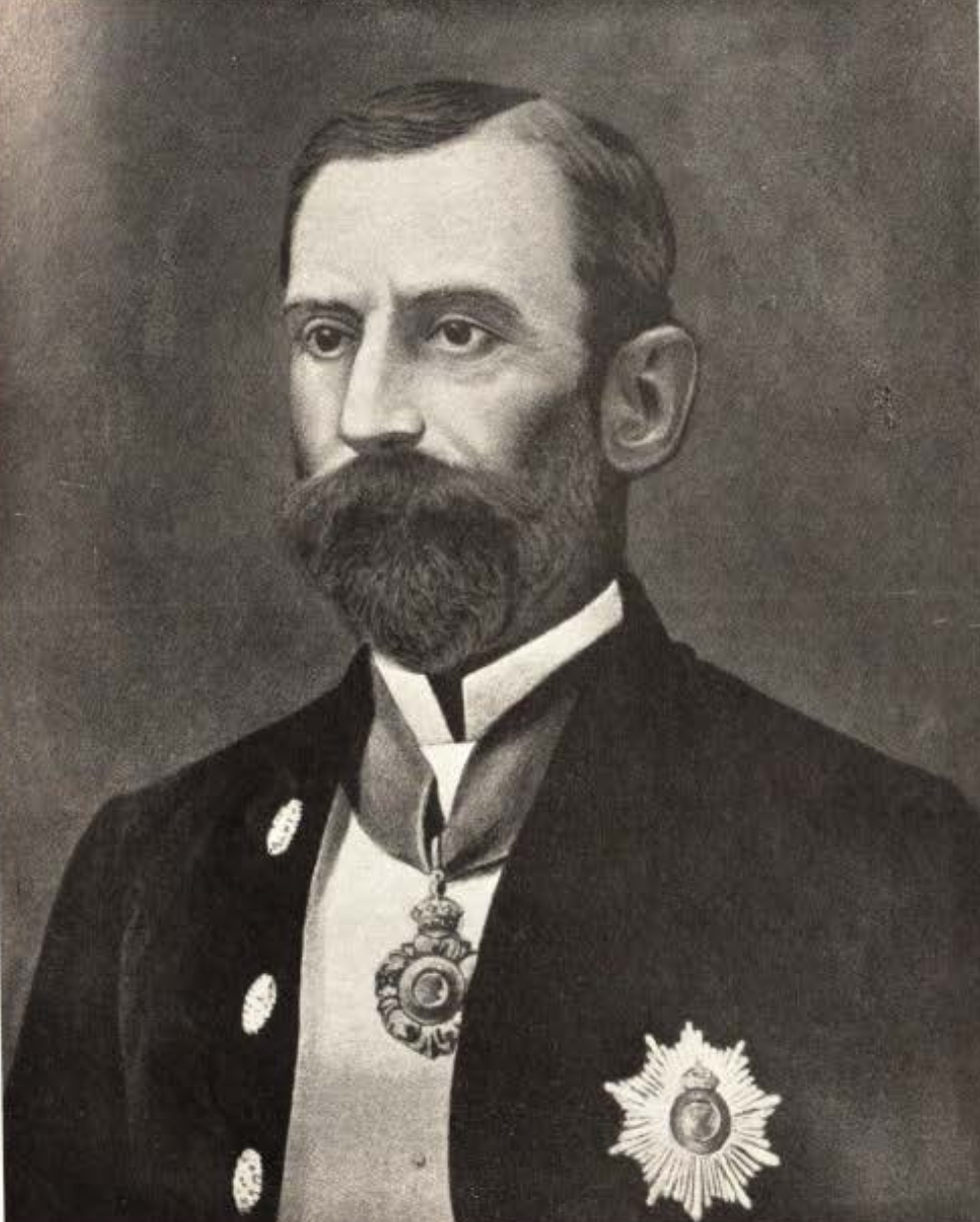
- Born: 7 February 1841; Plymouth, Devon, England
- Died: 29 October 1925 (aged 84); Tavistock, Devon, England
- Occupation: Colonial administrator

Academic background
- Education: Exeter College, Oxford (MA)

Academic work
- Discipline: Philosophy
- Institutions: Presidency College; University of Calcutta

Sir Alfred Woodley Croft KCIE (7 February 1841 – 29 October 1925) was a British educationist and administrator who spent most of his career in India. From 1877 until his retirement in 1897 he was Director of Public Instruction in Bengal, and was appointed a Companion of the Order of the Indian Empire (CIE) in November 1884.

Born in Compton Gifford, he was the son of Charles and Charlotte Croft. He was educated at the Mannamead School. He graduated BA in philosophy from the Exeter College, Oxford in 1863 and an MA in 1871. He went to Calcutta to join the Bengal Education Service in 1866 as a professor of philosophy to Presidency College, then under the University of Calcutta.

Previously Croft was appointed a Companion of the Order of the Indian Empire in 1887 he was raised to a knighthood as a Knight Commander of the order and was described as a Director of Public Instruction for Bengal.

He served as the vice chancellor of the University of Calcutta from 1893 to 1896. In 1897, the University awarded him with an honorary doctorate degree on the occasion of his retirement.

He was also a member of the Bengal Legislative Council from 1887 to 1892.

Croft returned to England and never married, he died in Tavistock on 29 October 1925.
