= Srikumar Banerjee =

Indian metallurgical engineer (1946–2021)

Dr. Srikumar Banerjee
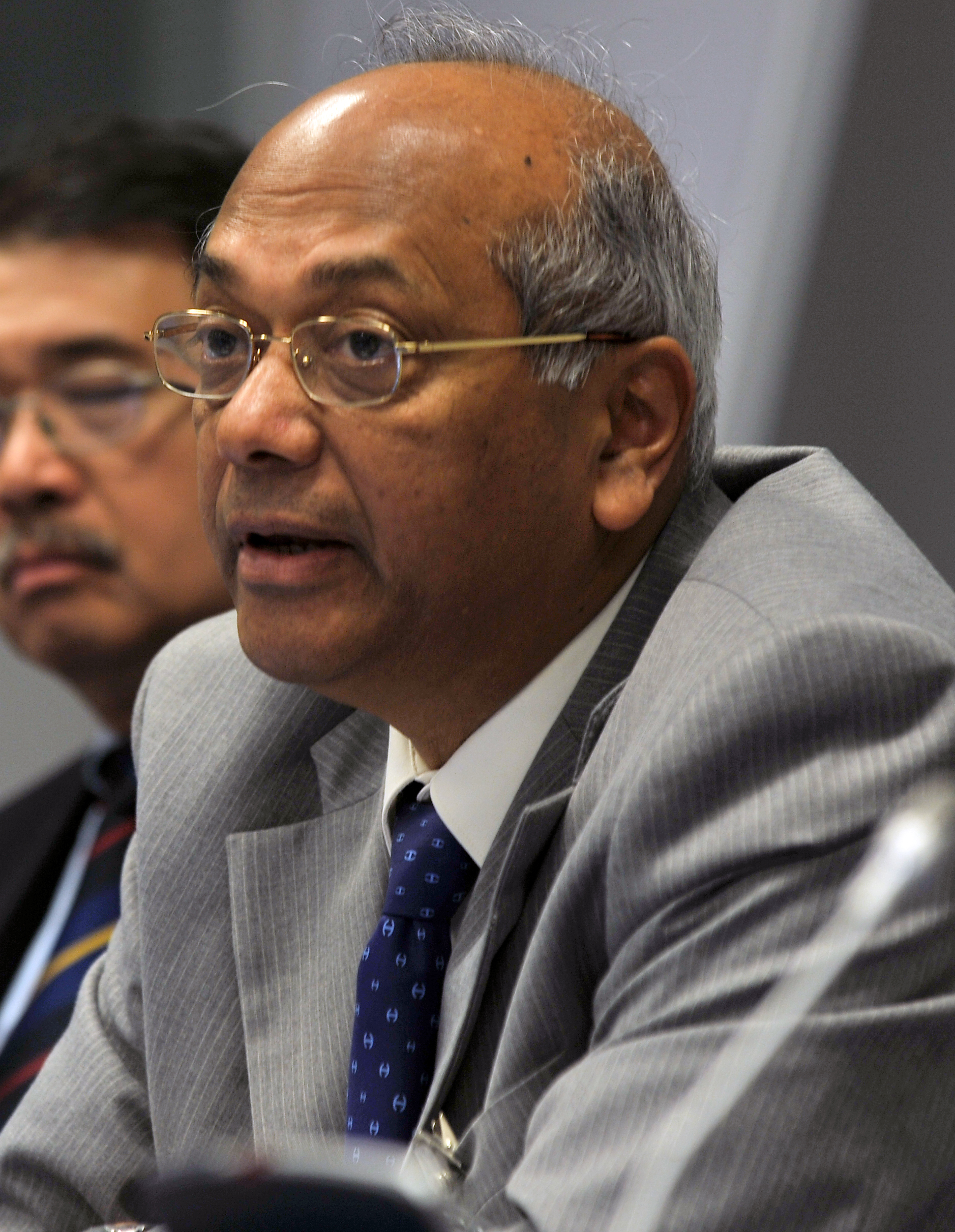
- Born: 25 April 1946
- Died: 23 May 2021 (aged 75)
- Education: Indian Institute of Technology Kharagpur
- Known for: Indian nuclear program
- Awards: Padma Shri (2005); Shanti Swarup Bhatnagar Prize for Science and Technology (1989)
- Scientific career
- Fields: Metallurgy
- Workplaces: Bhabha Atomic Research Centre (BARC); Department of Atomic Energy (DAE); Atomic Energy Commission of India (AEC)

Dr. Srikumar Banerjee (25 April 1946 – 23 May 2021) was an Indian metallurgical engineer. He retired as the chairman of the Atomic Energy Commission of India (AECI) and the secretary of Department of Atomic Energy (DAE) on 30 April 2012. Prior to his stint as DAE chairman, he was the director of Bhabha Atomic Research Centre (BARC) from 30 April 2004 to 19 May 2010. He had also served as a DAE Homi Bhabha Chair Professor at Bhabha Atomic Research Centre, Mumbai. He was known as a great physical metallurgist.

Dr. Banerjee died during the early morning of 23 May 2021, from a heart attack at his residence in Navi Mumbai. He had recovered from COVID-19 in previous month.

== Education ==
In 1967, Banerjee obtained a B.Tech degree with honours in metallurgical engineering from the Indian Institute of Technology Kharagpur. Thereafter, he underwent training at the Training School of BARC. He joined the erstwhile Metallurgy Division of BARC in 1968 and spent his entire scientific career in this establishment. On the basis of the work carried out by him in the first few years of his career in BARC, he was awarded the Ph.D. degree in metallurgical engineering by IIT, Kharagpur, in 1974.

Banerjee held visiting positions overseas which include the University of Sussex, Brighton, England, Max-Planck-Institut für Metallforschung, University of Cincinnati and the Ohio State University, USA (as Visiting Faculty).

== Honors and recognition ==
Dr. Banerjee was awarded the Shanti Swarup Bhatnagar Prize for Science and Technology in Engineering Science (1989) for his work on the development of thermo-mechanical treatment of Zr-2.5%Nb pressure tube for Indian pressurized heavy water reactor (PHWR) and Government of India’s civilian award, Padma Shri, in 2005 for his contribution in development of Ni-Ti-Fe based shape memory alloy (SMA) fasteners.

In 2010, the University of Calcutta awarded him an honorary Doctor of Science degree.

Banerjee was a Fellow of Indian Academy of Sciences, Bangalore, National Academy of Sciences, India, Allahabad, and the Indian National Academy of Engineering.

Banerjee was DAE Homi Bhabha Chair Professor, Bhabha Atomic Research Centre. He was appointed the Chairman, Board of Governors of IIT Kharagpur from 21 March 2014, for a period of three years.
