= CIRUS reactor =

Research reactor in Trombay, India

Coordinates: 19°00′28″N 72°55′07″E

CIRUS (Canada India Reactor Utility Services) was a research reactor at the Bhabha Atomic Research Center (BARC) in Trombay near Mumbai, India. CIRUS was supplied by Canada in 1954, but used heavy water (deuterium oxide) supplied by the United States. It was the second nuclear reactor to be built in India.

It was modeled on the Canadian Chalk River National Research X-perimental (NRX) reactor. The 40 MW reactor used natural uranium fuel, while using heavy water as a moderator. It is a tank reactor type with a core size of 3.14 m (H) × 2.67 m (D). It first went critical July 10, 1960.

The reactor was not under IAEA safeguards (which did not exist when the reactor was sold), although Canada stipulated, and the U.S. supply contract for the heavy water explicitly specified, that it only be used for peaceful purposes. Nonetheless, CIRUS produced some of India's initial weapons-grade plutonium stockpile, as well as the plutonium for India's 1974 Pokhran-I (Codename Smiling Buddha) nuclear test, the country's first nuclear test. At a capacity factor of 50–80%, CIRUS can produce 6.6–10.5 kg of plutonium a year.

CIRUS was shut down in September 1997 for refurbishment and was scheduled to resume operation in 2003. The reactor was brought back into operation two years late in 2005. During refurbishing, a low-temperature vacuum evaporation-based desalination unit was also coupled to the reactor to serve as demonstration of using waste heat from a research reactor for sea desalination. Even if the reactor has a life of twenty more years, India had declared that this reactor would be shut down by 2010 in accordance with the Indo-US nuclear accord reached between Indian Prime Minister Manmohan Singh and US President George W. Bush. The reactor was shut down on 31 December 2010.
