= Durga Das Basu =

Indian jurist and lawyer

Durga Das Basu (1910–1997) was an Indian jurist and lawyer. He wrote the Commentary on the Constitution of the Republic of India and Casebook on the Indian Constitutional Law. The former is one of the most important textbooks in social sciences and legal studies related to the Constitution of the Republic of India.

He was born in 1910. Basu was awarded the Padma Bhushan in 1985, and nominated as honorary fellow of Asiatic Society in 1994. He died in the year 1997.
