= M. R. Srinivasan =

Indian nuclear scientist and mechanical engineer (1930–2025)

Malur Ramasamy Srinivasan
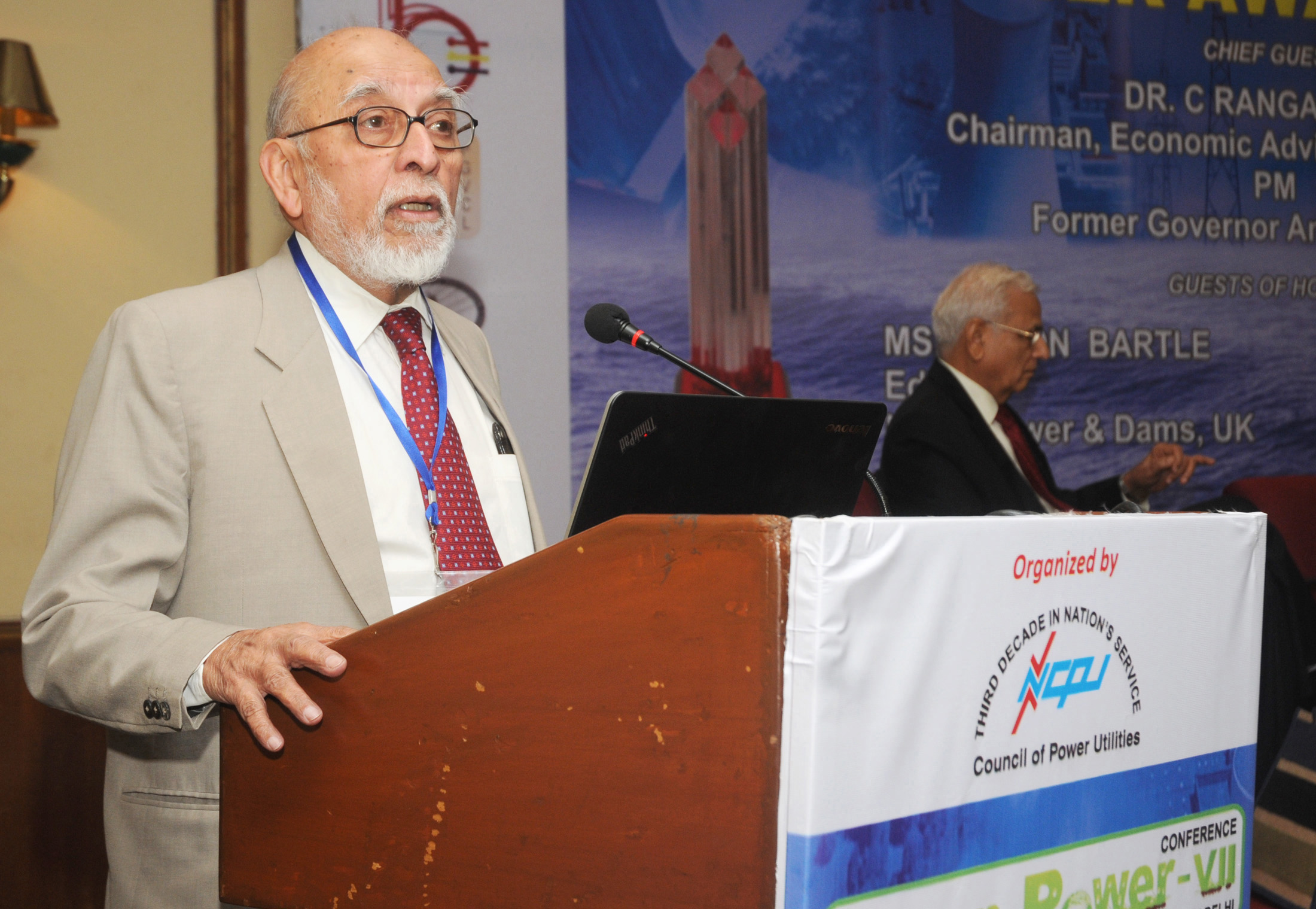
- Srinivasan speaking in 2011
- Born: 5 January 1930; Bangalore, Mysore State, India (now Karnataka, India)
- Died: 20 May 2025 (aged 95); Udagamandalam, Tamil Nadu, India
- Citizenship: India
- Education: University Visvesvaraya College of Engineering; McGill University
- Known for: Nuclear program of India; Gas turbine
- Children: Sharada Srinivasan (daughter); Raghuvir Srinivasan (son)
- Awards: Padma Vibhushan (2015); Padma Shri (1984)
- Scientific career
- Fields: Mechanical engineering
- Workplaces: Atomic Energy Commission of India; Department of Atomic Energy; International Atomic Energy Agency; Planning Commission

Malur Ramasamy Srinivasan (5 January 1930 – 20 May 2025) was an Indian nuclear scientist and mechanical engineer. He played a key role in the development of India's nuclear power programme and the development of the Pressurized heavy-water reactor (PHWR). He received the Padma Vibhushan award in 2015.

== Early life and education ==
The third of eight siblings, Srinivasan was born in Bangalore, on 5 January 1930. He completed his schooling at the Intermediate College, Mysore in the science stream where he chose Sanskrit and English as his language for study. Despite physics being his first love, he joined the newly started engineering college (currently UVCE) by M. Visvesvaraya, where he obtained a bachelor's degree in Mechanical Engineering in 1950. He subsequently completed his master's in 1952 and was awarded a doctor of Philosophy degree in 1954 from McGill University, Montreal, Canada. His field of specialization was gas turbine technology.

== Career ==
Srinivasan joined the Department of Atomic Energy in September 1955. He worked with Homi Bhabha on the construction of India's first nuclear research reactor, Apsara, which went critical in August 1956. In August 1959, Srinivasan was appointed Principal Project Engineer in the construction of India's first atomic power station. Following this, in 1967, Srinivasan was appointed Chief Project Engineer at the Madras Atomic Power Station.

In 1974, Srinivasan was appointed Director, Power Projects Engineering Division, DAE and then Chairman, Nuclear Power Board, DAE in 1984. In these capacities, he was responsible for planning, execution, and operation, of all nuclear power projects in the country. In 1987, he was appointed chairman, Atomic Energy Commission and Secretary, Department of Atomic Energy, with responsibility for all aspects of the Indian Nuclear Program. The Nuclear Power Corporation of India was created in September 1987, with Srinivasan as the Founder-Chairman. He was responsible for a total of 18 nuclear power units, of which seven are in operation, another seven under construction, and four still in the planning stages.

== Other responsibilities ==
Srinivasan was a senior adviser at the International Atomic Energy Agency, Vienna from 1990 to 1992. He was a Member of the Planning Commission, Government of India from 1996 to 1998, looking after the portfolios of Energy, and Science & Technology. He was a Member of India's National Security Advisory Board from 2002 to 2004 and again from 2006 to 2008. He was also Chairman, Task Force on Higher Education, Karnataka from 2002 to 2004. Srinivasan was Founder Member of World Association of Nuclear Operators (WANO); Fellow, Indian National Academy of Engineering and Institution of Engineers (India) and Emeritus Fellow of the Indian Nuclear Society.

== Death ==
Srinivasan died on 20 May 2025, at the age of 95.

== Awards and honours ==
- Kannada Rajyotsava award, 2017
- Asian Scientist 100, Asian Scientist, 2016
- Padma Vibhushan in 2015
- Padma Bhushan in 1990.
- Padma Shri in 1984
- Diamond Jubilee Award of the Central Board of Irrigation and Power
- Best Designer Award of the Institution of Engineers (India)
- Sanjay Gandhi Award for Science & Technology
- Om Prakash Bhasin Award for Science & Technology
- Homi Bhabha Gold Medal from the Indian Science Congress
- Distinguished Alumnus Award by Vishveshwaraya College of Engineering, Bangalore
- Homi Bhabha Life Time Award of Indian Nuclear Society
