= National Institute of Advanced Studies =

Indian academic research institute

Coordinates: 13.01978°N 77.56605°E

- Type: Autonomous Research Institute; Institute of Exceptional Repute
- Established: 20 June 1988; 38 years ago
- Founders: J.R.D. Tata; Dr. Raja Ramanna
- Director: Shailesh Nayak
- Location: Bengaluru, Karnataka, India
- Website: www.nias.res.in

National Institute of Advanced Studies (NIAS) is an Indian multidisciplinary research institute. The institution, based in Bengaluru, in the south Indian state of Karnataka, started functioning on 20 June 1988 with Dr. Raja Ramanna as its founder director.

== Overview ==
The National Institute of Advanced Studies was conceived by Jehangir Ratanji Dadabhoy Tata, a businessman and a pioneer of Indian aviation, who envisaged the institute to act as a meeting ground for the intellectuals of India for exchange views and ideas. The institute came into being on 20 June 1988, registered as a society under the Karnataka Societies Registration Regulation Act with Raja Ramanna, the Indian physicist, as the founder director. During a short period when he joined the central government as a Minister of State, C. N. R. Rao held the responsibilities of the director as the honorary director (pro tempore). Ramanna returned to NIAS and stayed with the institute until his superannuation in July 1997 to hand over the directorship to Roddam Narasimha who headed NIAS until March 2004. The next director, K. Kasturirangan, was with NIAS from April 2004 until August 2009 and the leadership changed hands to V. S. Ramamurthy, in September 2009. Baldev Raj became the director of the institute in 2014, and served the office until his untimely demise on January 6, 2018. V. S. Ramamurthy, the former director of the institute, was called in as the interim director. Shailesh Nayak assumed the directorship in March 2018.

The National Institute of Advanced Studies is involved in four areas of activities such as research, analysis, publications and education. It acts as a platform for advanced research in the disciplines of sciences, arts, and humanities. The research findings are compiled and disseminated through printed literature, personal interactions, lectures and conferences. The centre works as a forum for the social and political leaders and academics to interact with each other for interdisciplinary exchange of knowledge and information. Besides regular courses, it also started PhD programmes in 2004.

NIAS is located within the campus of the Indian Institute of Science, Bengaluru, with an extent of five acres earmarked for the institute's activities. The campus houses lecture halls, conference facilities, theatre and an auditorium, J. R. D. Tata Auditorium, named after its founder. The institute maintains a well stocked library and has accommodation facilities for guests and visitors.

In 2022, NIAS produced a documentary film called Keni: Preserving Indigenous Food Culture about the indigenous food culture and ways of life of the Mullukuruman, a scheduled tribal community who inhabits the Wayanad. This film is directed by Sukanya G and cinematography done by Midhun Eravil.

== Objectives ==
The institute is mandated with a mission to:

- Organize interdisciplinary and multidisciplinary research in natural sciences, social sciences, arts, humanities and technology.
- Integrate the research findings and dissemination of information for the benefit of Indian and global society.
- Create a new leadership in all sectors of the society by education and interaction.

== Divisions ==
The academic activities of the institute are segmented into four schools. Each school functions as a separate division and has a host of permanent teaching faculty and a set of visiting professors.

School of Conflict and Security Studies This new School has come into being in May 2016 and covers research in areas related to conflict resolution, strategy and security issues. Programmes of the School focus on major conflicts that affect India or have the potential to do so; and international strategic and geopolitical issues that have bearing on India's national security.

School of Humanities is a centre for advanced research in the disciplines of philosophy, psychology, literature, fine arts and culture. The school offers research facilities in:

- Cognitive sciences
- Scientific and philosophical studies of consciousness
- Indian psychology and philosophy
- History and philosophy of biology
- Archaeometalurgy and analysis of ancient metals
- Neuropsychiatry, Neurophenemenology and Neurophilosophy

School of Social Sciences is a research platform but is also engaged in teaching, outreach, advocacy and consultancy. It undertakes research cum outreach projects in the areas of education, gender, inequality, governance, urbanization and development. It has interests in the topics of globalization, economic sociology and organizations.

School of Natural Sciences and Engineering is the division which focuses on energy, environment, climate change, complex systems, ecology, animal behaviour, cognition and conservation biology. Studies are conducted on wildlife conservation and cognitive studies of primates. Research has been carried out number theory, artificial intelligence, soft computing, and mathematical modelling of complex chaotic systems.

== Courses ==
The institute offers several courses through four of its schools and many programmes anchored by the institute. Listed below are few of the many interdisciplinary courses offered at the institute.

- School of Conflict and Security Studies
1. Understanding Theories of Conflict
2. Global Politics
3. Maritime Security
4. GIS application in security
- School of Humanities
1. Course title: Relevance of Psychology
2. Behavior, Cognition and Consciousness: An Introduction
3. Core course in Humanities
4. Effective Communication and Interpersonal Intelligence
- School of Natural and Engineering Sciences
1. Energy Systems: Technology and Policy
2. Introduction to Dynamical Systems Theory
- School of Social Sciences
1. Anthropology of circulation and value
2. Gifted Education
3. Perspectives in Education Research
4. Core course in Social Sciences

== Notable faculty ==
Several notable personalities have served as the members of faculty at NIAS, some of whom have been awarded the highest civilian awards in the country. The institute hosts four chairs of excellence namely JRD Tata Chair, Raja Ramanna Chair, Homi Bhabha Chair and T. V. Raman Pai chair.

- Raja Ramanna, Physicist and Padma Vibhushan awardee
- M. N. Srinivas, Sociologist and Padma Bhushan awardee
- C. N. R. Rao, Chemist and Bharat Ratna awardee
- Roddam Narasimha, Aerospace scientist and Padma Vibhushan awardee
- K. Kasturirangan, Space scientist and Padma Vibhushan awardee
- V. S. Ramamurthy, Nuclear physicist and Padma Bhushan awardee
- B. V. Sreekantan, Physicist and Padma Bhushan awardee
- C. Venkataraman Sundaram, Metallurgist and Padma Bhushan awardee
- Timothy Poston, Mathematician
- Shadakshari Settar, Art-Historian
- Sundar Sarukkai, Philosopher
- Sharada Srinivasan, Archaeologist
- Ricky Kej, Grammy Award winner
- S Balachandra Rao, mathematician and science historian
- Heribert Dieter, Political Economist

== See also ==
- Indian Institute of Science
