= Atomic Energy Commission of India =

Governing body of India's Department of Atomic Energy

Agency overview
- Formed: 3 August 1948; 78 years ago
- Preceding agency: Department of Scientific Research
- Jurisdiction: India
- Headquarters: Mumbai, Maharashtra
- Annual budget: ₹ 9,410 cr (FY 2023)
- Agency executive: Dr. Ajit Kumar Mohanty, Chairman
- Parent department: Department of Atomic Energy, Government of India
- Website: https://dae.gov.in/atomic-energy-commission/

The Atomic Energy Commission of India is the governing body of the Department of Atomic Energy, Government of India. The DAE is under the direct charge of the Prime Minister.

The Indian Atomic Energy Commission was set up on 3 August 1948 under the late Department of Scientific Research. A resolution passed by the Government of India later replaced the commission by "Atomic Energy Commission of India" on ,1 March 1954 under the Department of Atomic Energy with Homi J. Bhabha as secretary and more financial and executive powers, headquartered in Mumbai, Maharashtra.

The functions of the Atomic Energy Commission are:

(i) to organize research in atomic science in the country

(ii) to train atomic scientists in the country

(iii) to promote nuclear research in commission's own laboratories in India

(iv) to undertake prospecting of atomic minerals in India and to extract such minerals for use on industrial scale.

India achieved a major success in terms of breakthrough in science and technology when the Atomic Energy Commission (AEC) detonated an underground nuclear device at Pokhran in the Thar Desert on 18 May 1974.

It has six research centres in India viz.

- Bhabha Atomic Research Centre (BARC), Mumbai
- Indira Gandhi Centre for Atomic Research (IGCAR), Kalpakkam (Tamil Nadu)
- Raja Ramanna Centre for Advanced Technology (RRCAT), Indore
- Variable Energy Cyclotron Centre (VECC), Kolkata
- Atomic Minerals Directorate for Exploration and Research (AMD), Hyderabad.
- Global Centre for Nuclear Energy Partnership (GCNEP), Haryana

It also gives financial assistance to autonomous national institutes doing research in the field and has various other organisations under it.

== Chairpersons ==
List of Chairpersons of Atomic Energy Commission of India

1. Homi J. Bhabha (1948–1966)
2. Vikram Sarabhai (1966–1971)
3. Homi Sethna (1972–1983)
4. Raja Ramanna (1983–1987)
5. M. R. Srinivasan (1987–1990)
6. P. K. Iyengar (1990–1993)
7. Rajagopala Chidambaram (1993–2000)
8. Anil Kakodkar (2000–2009)
9. Srikumar Banerjee (2009–2012)
10. Ratan Kumar Sinha (2012–2015)
11. Sekhar Basu (2015–2018)
12. Kamlesh Nilkanth Vyas (2018–2023)
13. Ajit Kumar Mohanty (2023–present)
