= Shivram Bhoje =

Indian nuclear physicist (1942–2025)

Shivram Baburao Bhoje (9 April 1942 – 16 September 2025) was an Indian nuclear scientist who worked in the field of fast-breeder nuclear reactor technology for 40 years in the design, construction, operation, and research and development. The Indian government honoured him with the Padma Shri in 2003, the fourth highest civilian award in India, for his distinguished service to science and engineering fields.

== Life and career ==
Bhoje was born on 9 April 1942 in Kasaba Sangaon, a small village in Kolhapur district which falls under Kagal Taluka jurisdiction. He completed his schooling in Dadasaheb Magadum high school, Kasaba Sangaon. He was famous for his knowledge in mathematics and science in his school. After completing schooling, he moved to Rajaram College Kolhapur to complete his junior college education. He completed his Bachelor's degree in Mechanical Engineering in 1965 from College of Engineering Pune, COEP, University of Pune.

=== Professional ===
Bhoje completed one year training in Nuclear Science and Engineering at the Bhabha Atomic Research Centre Training School and joined as a Scientific Officer at BARC, Trombay. He started working in the Fast Reactor Section for design of an experimental reactor. He was on a one-year deputation to the Centre d'Etudes Nucleare Cadarache, France, as a member of the design team of the 13-mW fast-breeder test reactor (FBTR) in 1969–70.

After returning to India in 1971, he worked at Indira Gandhi Centre for Atomic Research, Kalpakkam. Initially he was in-charge of design of 40 MW Fast Breeder Test Reactor (FBTR) reactor assembly. On completion of the design, he was responsible for the construction of FBTR. He redesigned the reactor core with new carbide fuel. In 1988 he became the Reactor Superintendent of FBTR. He removed the initial problems and raised the reactor power in steps, after commissioning of all the systems. The reactor was connected to the grid and electricity was generated in July 1997 at 10 MW power. In September 2002 the indigenously designed and fabricated fuel reached a burn up of 100,000 MWd/t without any failure.

In 1985, he was designated as the Head of Nuclear Systems Division and was responsible for the preliminary design of 500 MWe Prototype Fast Breeder Reactor (PFBR). He developed the capability in the centre to carry out sophisticated analysis for design. In 1992, he became the Director, Reactor Group and was responsible for the operation of FBTR and design and engineering R &D of PFBR. He developed PFBR design safety criteria as per AERB norms. He served as the Member and Chairman of several committees of Department of Atomic Energy.

In August 2000, he was promoted as Distinguished Scientist. In November 2000, he became the Director, Indira Gandhi Center for Atomic Research. He significantly contributed in design, R&D, manufacturing technology development, obtained statutory clearances for construction and pre-project activities of PFBR.

Financial approval for the PFBR project was obtained in September 2003 and the construction was started in August 2003 itself. A new Public Sector Undertakings (PSU) called Bharatiya Nabhikiya Vidyut Nigam (BHAVINI) was established in October 2003 for the construction and operation of PFBR. Bhoje was one of the founder Directors of this company.

Bhoje published over 200 papers in journals and conferences. He represented India as a member of International Atomic Energy Agency (IAEA) during 1987–1997. He was a member of the IAEA Senior Advisory Group on Nuclear Energy and also a member of a steering committee on Innovative Reactor and Fuel Cycle project. He coordinated FBTR R&D, funded by IGCAR and carried out in 25 different educational institutions and research centres like Fluid Control Research Institute, Kirloskar Brothers Ltd, Pune.

He retired from government service at the age of 62, on superannuation, in April 2004. Bhoje also worked as an Educational Advisor to Shivaji University, Kolhapur. He was member of All India Board of Post-Graduate Education and Research Engineering and Technology of All India Council for Technical Education (AICTE).

=== Social work ===
Bhoje was a founder member of Aamhi Sangaonkar, a social organisation meant for the development of rural areas around his native village.

=== Personal life and death ===
After retirement, Bhoje settled in Kolhapur, Maharashtra. He died there on 16 September 2025, at the age of 83.

== Awards ==
1. Padma Shri, for his contribution to science and engineering 2003.
2. H K Firodia awards for his contribution science and technology 2006.
3. VASVIK Industrial Research Award, in the field of Mechanical Sciences and Technology, 1992.
4. Sir Visvesvaraya Memorial Award from Engineers Foundation
