= FBR-600 =

Indian fast breeder nuclear reactor design

- Generation: Generation III+ reactor
- Reactor concept: Plutonium Fast breeder reactor
- Reactor line: IFBR (Indian fast-breeder Reactor)
- Designed by: IGCAR
- Manufactured by: BHAVINI
- Status: Under development

Main parameters of the reactor core
- Fuel (fissile material): ^{235}U/^{239}Pu (NEU/^{239}Pu/MOX)
- Fuel state: Solid
- Neutron energy spectrum: Fast
- Primary control method: control rods
- Primary coolant: Liquid Sodium

Reactor usage
- Primary use: Breeding of ^{233}U for AHWR-300 and Generation of electricity
- Power (electric): 600

The Fast Breeder Reactor-600 (FBR-600) or Indian Fast Breeder Reactor (IFBR) or Commercial Fast Breeder Reactor (CFBR) is a 600-MWe fast breeder nuclear reactor design presently being designed as part of India's three-stage nuclear power programme to commercialise the Prototype Fast Breeder Reactor built at Kalpakkam. The Indira Gandhi Centre for Atomic Research (IGCAR) is responsible for the design of this reactor as a successor for Prototype Fast Breeder Reactor (PFBR). The 1st twin unit would come up within the BHAVINI premises at Madras Atomic Power Station at Kalpakkam, close to the PFBR site itself.

Designed to "burn" a mixture of uranium oxide and plutonium oxide to generate 600 MWe of power each, current plans involve building six units, co-locating two at any given place. This arrangement would facilitate cost-rationalisation, using common auxiliaries to serve both reactors.

Core loading of PFBR began on 4 March 2024 in the presence of Prime Minister Narendra Modi. The announced start of operations by end of 2025 was delayed.

== Design features ==
According to the research conducted at IGCAR, the improved design concepts indicated significant economic advantages by reducing material inventory by 25%, simplifying fuel handling scheme and by reducing manufacture time with enhanced safety parameters.

== Safety features ==
CFBR designs mentions a new and improved decay heat removal (DHR) system, reactor shutdown system from its predecessor PFBR. Passive safety features include new hydraulically suspended absorber rods (HSAR) which fall into the core under the influence of gravity if coolant flow is lost, and the inclusion of an ultimate shutdown system (USD) which would use pressurized gas to forcefully inject neutron poisons directly into the core to halt re-criticality incidents.

== Reactor fleet ==
| Power station | Operator | Location | Status | Operation start |
|---|---|---|---|---|
| PFBR (Prototype) | BHAVINI | Kalpakkam, Tamil Nadu | Critical | 2026 (planned) |
| FBR-1 | BHAVINI | Kalpakkam, Tamil Nadu | Planned | |
| FBR-2 | BHAVINI | Kalpakkam, Tamil Nadu | Planned | |

== See also ==
- Prototype Fast Breeder Reactor
- India's three-stage nuclear power programme
- Advanced heavy-water reactor
- Bhabha Atomic Research Centre
- Fast Breeder Test Reactor
- BHAVINI
