= Prototype Fast Breeder Reactor =

Indian fast breeder nuclear reactor design

- Official name: आदिप्ररूप द्रुत प्रजनक रिएक्टर
- Country: India
- Location: Kokkilamedu, near Kalpakkam, Tamil Nadu, India
- Coordinates: 12°33′11″N 80°10′24″E
- Status: First criticality achieved on 6 April 2026
- Construction began: 2004
- Commission date: 2026
- Construction cost: ₹5,850 crore (equivalent to ₹230 billion or US$2.44 billion in 2026)
- Owner: BHAVINI
- Operator: BHAVINI

Nuclear power station
- Reactor type: Sodium-cooled fast breeder reactor

Thermal power station
- Primary fuel: Uranium–plutonium mixed oxide (MOX)
- Cooling source: Sodium

Power generation
- Nameplate capacity: 500 MW_{e}
- Reactor line: IFBR (Indian fast-breeder Reactor)
- Designed by: IGCAR
- Manufactured by: BHAVINI
Main parameters of the reactor core
- Fuel state: Solid
- Neutron energy spectrum: Fast
- Primary control method: Control rods
- Primary coolant: Liquid sodium
Reactor usage
- Primary use: Electricity generation and breeding plutonium-239
- Power (thermal): 1,253 MW_{th}

The Prototype Fast Breeder Reactor (PFBR) is a 500 MWe pool type sodium-cooled, fast breeder reactor commissioned at the same site as the Madras Atomic Power Station in Kokkilamedu, near Kalpakkam, Tamil Nadu, India.

The indigenously developed reactor achieves a crucial second stage outlined in India's three stage nuclear power program building on the decades of experience gained from operating the lower power Kalpakkam Mini reactor (KAMINI) and Fast Breeder Test Reactor (FBTR). The PFBR is designed to generate electricity and breed plutonium-239 in a uranium-238 blanket.

The project is commissioned by Bharatiya Nabhikiya Vidyut Nigam Limited (BHAVINI), a public sector undertaking under the Department of Atomic Energy (DAE). Indira Gandhi Centre for Atomic Research (IGCAR) is responsible for the reactor's design. The Advanced Fuel Fabrication Facility at BARC's Tarapur campus is responsible for MOX fuel fabrication. Bharat Heavy Electricals Limited (BHEL) is providing technology and equipment for construction of the reactor.

Construction work on the reactor beginning in 2004, was supposed to be completed in September 2010 but upon facing several delays was completed on 4 March 2024. In April 2026, BusinessLine reported that the project's cost had risen to ₹8,181 crore. The Prototype Fast Breeder Reactor successfully achieved first criticality on 6 April 2026 at 08:25 PM IST.

== Background ==
The PFBR is designed to generate electricity and breed plutonium-239 in a uranium-238 blanket. A planned thorium-232 blanket would produce uranium-233 for the third stage of India's nuclear power programme. FBR is thus a stepping stone for the third stage of the program paving the way for the eventual full utilization of India's abundant thorium reserves. The surplus plutonium (or uranium-233 for thorium reactors) from each fast reactor can be used to set up more such reactors and grow the nuclear capacity in tune with India's needs for power. The PFBR is part of India's three-stage nuclear power programme laid down by Homi J. Bhabha.

India has the capability to use thorium cycle based processes to extract nuclear fuel. This is of special significance to the Indian nuclear power generation strategy as India has one of the world's largest reserves of thorium.

== Design and construction ==
=== Commissioning ===
For drawing a plan for PFBR, a steering group of scientists was set up in December 1979 by Dr. Raja Ramanna, the then Secretary of DAE. Its report published in 1980 was iterated upon by a PFBR working group, in coming up with a design proposal in 1983. Based on design validation and analysis, a detailed project report was submitted in 1985 for financial sanction, which had to undergo further tests and studies resulting in a revised detailed project report for PFBR published in 2002 that received financial sanction by Government of India in September 2003, expecting completion in 2010. The design of PFBR drew inspiration and lessons learnt from operation of lower power Kalpakkam Mini reactor (KAMINI) and Fast Breeder Test Reactor (FBTR).

Manufacture of components for the reactor and sodium metal procurement was completed by 2010 behind schedule, however the project also faced further string of delays, including technical delays, such as in commissioning of sodium circuits and preheating of main vessel, delays due to regulatory changes, such as Atomic Energy Regulatory Board (AERB) regulations regarding earthquake resistant safety designs following Fukushima accident, and problems with plutonium production and fuel fabrication. In April 2026, BusinessLine reported that the project's cost had risen to ₹8,181 crore.

Prime Minister Narendra Modi was in Kalpakkam on 4 March 2024 to witness the initiation of its first core loading, marking the second stage of India's three-stage nuclear power program. On 31 July 2024, AERB approved adding nuclear fuel and starting the chain reaction. But new technical issues crept up, after solving those, the AERB cleared BHAVINI to commence final fuel loading which began on 18 October 2025. The reactor first achieved criticality on 6 April 2026, establishing a sustained nuclear chain reaction.

The next step will link the reactor to electrical grid and start producing power on a commercial basis, pending approval from AERB. Kalpakkam will see the construction of two more fast breeder reactors after the DAE is satisfied with the reactor's performance. In December 2015, The Economic Times reported plans for six additional fast breeder reactors: two at Kalpakkam after a year of PFBR operation, followed by four after 2030, at sites yet to be selected.

=== Technical details ===
Schematic diagram showing the difference between the loop and pool designs of a liquid metal fast breeder reactor. The pool-type has greater thermal inertia to changes in temperature, which therefore gives more time to shut down/SCRAM during a loss of coolant accident situation.

The reactor is a pool type LMFBR with 1,750 tonnes of sodium as coolant. Designed to generate 500 MWe of electrical power, with an operational life of 40 years, it will burn a mixed uranium–plutonium MOX fuel, a mixture of PuO_{2} and UO_{2}. A fuel burnup of 100 GWd/t is expected. The Fuel Fabrication Facility (FFF), under the direction of BARC, Tarapur is responsible for the fuel rods manufacturing. FFF comes under "Nuclear Recycle Board" of Bhabha Atomic Research Center and has been responsible for fuel rod manufacturing of various types in the past. In his Republic Day address on 26 January 2023, the BARC director reported that FFF Tarapur had fabricated 100,000 fuel elements for PFBR.

=== Safety considerations ===
The PFBR has positive coolant-void reactivity. The fuel Doppler effect and fuel expansion provide negative reactivity feedback as the fuel heats up. Similarly, before such a potential positive void condition may form from a complete loss of coolant accident, sufficient coolant flow rates are made possible by the use of conventional pump inertia, alongside multiple inlet-perforations, to prevent the possible accident scenario of a single blockage halting coolant flow.

The passive safety-grade decay heat removal system consists of four independent coolant circuits of 8 MWt capacity each. Further active defenses against the positive feedback possibility include two independent SCRAM shutdown systems, designed to shut the fission reactions down effectively within a second. After shutdown, the reactor continues to produce decay heat, which its passive heat removal system is designed to remove.

The fact that the PFBR is cooled by liquid sodium creates additional safety requirements to isolate the coolant from the environment, especially in a loss of coolant accident scenario, since sodium explodes if it comes into contact with water and burns when in contact with air. This latter event occurred in the Monju reactor in Japan in 1995. Another consideration with the use of sodium as a coolant is the absorption of neutrons to generate the radioactive isotope ^{24}Na, which has a 15-hour half life.

== See also ==
- FBR-600 – commercial variant of the PFBR design
- India's three stage nuclear power programme
