= Madras Atomic Power Station =

Nuclear power plant south of Chennai, India

Madras Atomic Power station
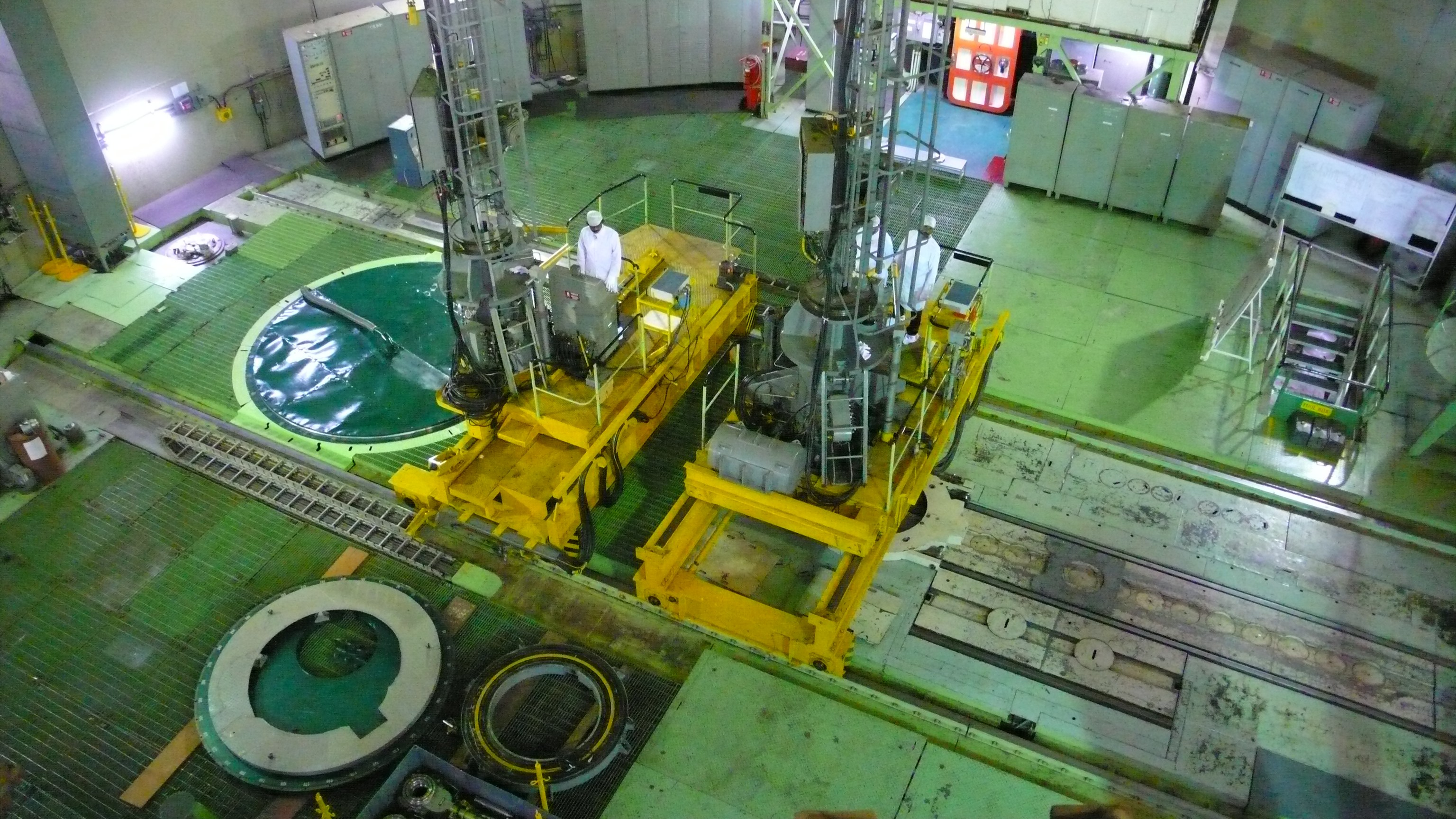
- Country: India
- Coordinates: 12°33′27″N 80°10′30″E
- Status: Operational
- Construction began: Units 1 & 2: 1970; PFBR: January 2004
- Commission date: Units 1: 27 January 1984; Units 2: 21 March 1986
- Owners: Units 1 & 2: NPCIL; PFBR, FBR-1&2: BHAVINI
- Operators: Units 1 & 2: NPCIL; PFBR, FBR-1&2: BHAVINI

Nuclear power station
- Reactors: 2
- Reactor type: Units 1 & 2: IPHWR-220; PFBR: Prototype; FBR-1&2: FBR-600
- Reactor supplier: Units 1 & 2: BARC/NPCIL; PFBR, FBR-1&2: IGCAR/BHAVINI
- Cooling source: Bay of Bengal

Power generation
- Units operational: 2 × 220 MW
- Units planned: 2 × 600 MW
- Units under const.: 1 × 500 MW
- Nameplate capacity: 440 MW
- Capacity factor: 44.21% (2020-21)
- Annual net output: 1703.92 GW.h (2020-21)

External links
- Website: Nuclear power Corporation of India Ltd
- Commons: Related media on Commons

Madras Atomic Power Station (MAPS) located at Kalpakkam about 80 kilometres (50 mi) south of Chennai, India, is a comprehensive nuclear power production, fuel reprocessing, and waste treatment facility that includes plutonium fuel fabrication for fast breeder reactors (FBRs). It is also India's first fully indigenously constructed nuclear power station, with two units each generating 220 MW of electricity. The first and second units of the station went critical in 1983 and 1985, respectively. The station has reactors housed in a reactor building with double shell containment improving protection also in the case of a loss-of-coolant accident. An Interim Storage Facility (ISF) is also located in Kalpakkam.

The facility is also home to India's first large scale fast breeder reactor of 500 MWe called the Prototype Fast Breeder Reactor operated by BHAVINI and will also be the site of first two FBR-600 commercial fast breeder reactors.

== History ==
During its construction, a total of 3.8 lakh (380,000) railway sleeper (logs) were brought from all over India to lift the 180 ton critical equipment in the first unit, due to lack of proper infrastructure and handling equipment.

As of July 2016 the Prototype Fast Breeder Reactor (PFBR) was in its final construction stage, and was expected to reach criticality in March 2017 with 500 MW of electricity production. The following month the loading of the 1750 ton liquid sodium coolant were expected to happen in four to five months, with sources in the Department of Atomic Energy reporting that criticality would likely be reached only around May 2017.

PFBR was completed in 2025 and reached first criticality on 6 April 2026.

== Reactors ==
The facility houses two indigenously built Pressurised Heavy-Water Reactors (PHWRs), MAPS-1 and MAPS-2 designed to produce 235 MW of electricity each. MAPS-1 was completed in 1981, but start-up was delayed due to a shortage of heavy water. After procuring the necessary heavy water, MAPS-1 went critical in 1983 and began operating at full power on 27 January 1984. MAPS-2 obtained criticality in 1985 and began full power operations on 21 March 1986.

With India not being a signatory to the Treaty on the Non-Proliferation of Nuclear Weapons the reactors have since 1985 been delivering their spent fuel to the nuclear reprocessing plant at Tarapur, providing the country with unsafeguarded plutonium.

A beachhead at Kalpakkam also hosts India's first indigenous Pressurised (light) water reactor (PWR). The 80 MW reactor was developed by Bhabha Atomic Research Centre (BARC) as the land-based prototype of the nuclear power unit for India's nuclear submarines. This unit does not come under MAPS.

== Units ==
Phase	Unit No.	Reactor		Status	Capacity in MWe		Construction start	First criticality	Grid Connection	Commercial operation	Closure	Notes
Phase	Unit No.	Type	Model	Status	Net	Gross	Construction start	First criticality	Grid Connection	Commercial operation	Closure	Notes
I	1	PHWR	IPHWR-220	Operation suspended (under maintenance)	202	220	1 January 1971	2 July 1983	23 July 1983	27 January 1984	—N/a	
I	2	PHWR	IPHWR-220	Operational	202	220	1 October 1972	12 August 1985	20 September 1985	21 March 1986	—N/a	
II	3	FBR	PFBR	Completed	470	500	23 October 2004	6 April 2026	—N/a	—N/a	—N/a	
III	4	FBR	FBR-600	Planned	570	600	—N/a	—N/a	—N/a	—N/a	—N/a	
III	5	FBR	FBR-600	Planned	570	600	—N/a	—N/a	—N/a	—N/a	—N/a	

== Incidents ==
The reactors' coolant pipes had been plagued by vibrations and cracking with substantial cracking in the reactor coolant system. This cracking has led to the discovery of Zircaloy pieces in a moderator pump, requiring the power generation to be lowered to 170 MW.

On 26 March 1999 large amounts of heavy water spilled at MAPS-2, exposing seven technicians to heavy doses of radiation.

== See also ==
- List of power stations in India
- Nuclear power in India
