= Pudupattinam, Chengalpattu =

Pudupattinam
- Census town
- Location in Tamil Nadu, India
- Coordinates: 12.5037°N 80.1507°E
- Country: India
- State: Tamil Nadu
- District: Chengalpattu

Population (2001)
  - Total: 20,897

Languages
  - Official: Tamil
- Time zone: UTC+5:30 (IST)
- PIN: 603102
- Telephone code: 91-44
- Vehicle registration: TN-19, TN-19AX

Pudupattinam is a census town in Chengalpattu district in the Indian state of Tamil Nadu.

It is famous for being located on the southern end of the township at Kalpakkam while Sadras is situated at the northern end. It is only a few kilometres from the reactor at IGCAR and MAPS

== Demographics ==
As of 2001 India census, Pudupattinam had a population of 20,897. Males constitute 51% of the population and females 49%. Pudupattinam has an average literacy rate of 81%, higher than the national average of 59.5%: male literacy is 86%, and female literacy is 76%. In Pudupattinam, 10% of the population is under 6 years of age.
