= Fast Breeder Test Reactor =

Breeder reactor in Tamil Nadu, India

Coordinates: 12°33′44″N 80°09′52″E

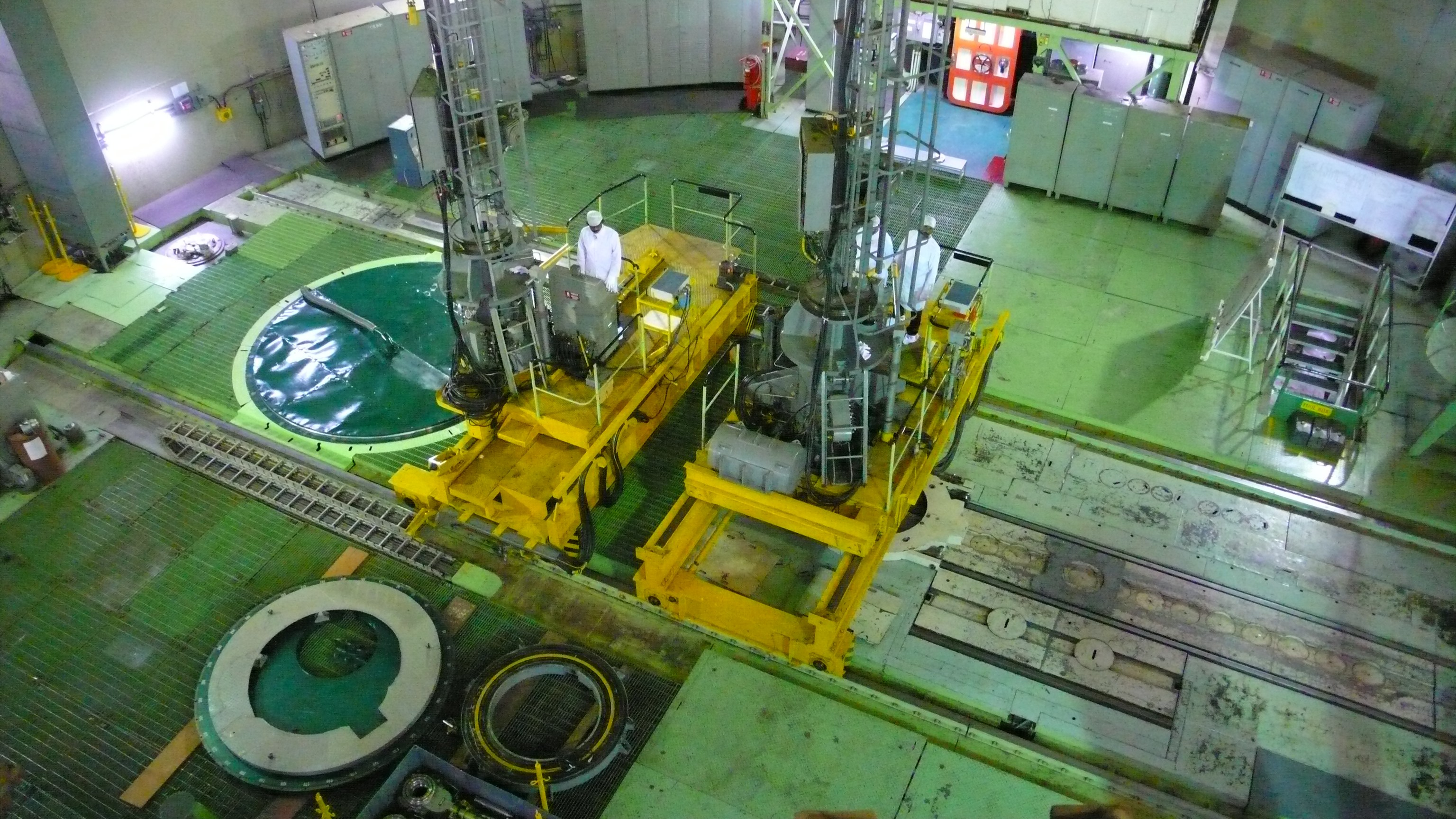
Fast Breeder Test Reactor in Kalpakkam

The Fast Breeder Test Reactor (FBTR) is a 40 MWt loop type, sodium cooled fast breeder reactor located at Kalpakkam, Tamil Nadu, India, using a mixture of Plutonium Carbide and Uranium Carbide as fuel dedicated to fast reactor research. Indira Gandhi Center for Atomic Research (IGCAR) and Bhabha Atomic Research Centre (BARC) jointly designed, constructed, and operate the reactor.

The reactor was commissioned in four stages, low power operation without steam generators until 1985, operation with sodium cooling without water valve-in 1986-1990, operation with water valve-in 1993-1996, and operation with turbo generator since 1997. It offered operating, designing and manufacturing experience in breeder reactor technology.

== History ==
In 1969, the Department of Atomic Energy (DAE) entered a collaboration agreement with the French Atomic Energy Commission (CEA), to obtain design of RAPSODIE test reactor and steam generator-based design of PHÉNIX reactor, which was under-construction at the time. As part of the agreement a team of thirty Indian engineers and scientists were trained at Cadarache, France. Upon return, the team formed Research Reactor Center (RCC) that was set up in Kalpakkam to lead India's breeder reactor efforts by executive order of Vikram Sarabhai in 1971, which was renamed to Indira Gandhi Centre for Atomic Research in 1985.

The reactor designs were significantly modified by Indian engineers for the construction of FBTR, designed to produce 40 MWt of thermal power and 13.2 MW of electrical power, initially designed to be using weapons grade plutonium-uranium mixed oxide fuel, which could not be realized following France withdrawing their offer of selling enriched uranium for the project after India's Smiling Buddha nuclear test in 1974. Non-availability of enriched uranium for the project prompted development of an alternative, mixed carbide fuel for the breeder reactor by BARC and IGCAR, providing better breeding and thermal properties although its little international experience with the fuel source posed a unique challenge for the project.

Construction started in 1972 and reached first criticality in October 1985 (40 years ago), making India the seventh nation to have the technology to build and operate a breeder reactor after United States, UK, France, Japan, Germany, and Russia. Almost all of the reactor was indegnously manufactured in India.

The FBTR has rarely operated at its designed capacity and had to be shut down between 1987 and 1989 due to technical problems. From 1989 to 1992, the reactor operated at 1 MW. In 1993, the reactor's power level was raised to 10.5 MW. In September 2002, fuel burn-up in the FBTR for the first time reached the 100,000 megawatt-days per metric ton uranium (MWd/MTU) mark. This is considered an important milestone in breeder reactor technology. On 7 March 2022 it attained the design power level of 40 MWt.

Using the experience gained from the operation of the FBTR and KAMINI a 500 MWe Prototype Fast Breeder Reactor (PFBR) is in advanced stage of construction at Kalpakkam. However, cabide fuel was dropped due its pyrophoric property, and mixed oxide fuel was considered instead for PFBR using 30% plutonium dioxide and 70% natural or depleted uranium dioxide.

== Technical details ==
The reactor uses a plutonium-uranium mixed carbide fuel and liquid sodium as a coolant. The fuel is an indigenous mix of 70 percent plutonium carbide and 30 percent uranium carbide. Plutonium for the fuel is extracted from irradiated fuel in the Madras power reactors and reprocessed in Tarapur.

Some of the uranium is created from the transmutation of thorium bundles that are also placed in the core.
