= Kasaba Sangaon =

Village in India

- village
- Location in Maharashtra, India
- Coordinates: 16.34°N 74.21°E
- Country: India
- State: Maharashtra
- District: Kolhapur

Government
  - Type: Grampanchayat
  - Body: 17
  - Sarpanch: Miss. Virashree Jadhav
  - Deputy Sarpanch: Shri. Sudarshan Majale

Population (2011)
  - Total: 12,730

Languages
  - Official: Marathi
- Time zone: UTC+5:30 (IST)
- PIN: 416217
- Telephone code: 02325
- Vehicle registration: MH-09

Kasaba Sangaon Kolhapur district, Maharashtra is a village located close to bank of Dudhaganga river. Its known history goes back to 1627, during the reign of Shivaji Maharaj of Maratha. Kasaba Sangaon is known as the village of freedom fighters. Of these are Dadasaheb Magdum, Ramchandra Herwade, Shrimandhar Herwade, Rupchand Shaha, Neminath Chougle, and Bhimrao Bhoje. Kasaba Sangaon is also known for its cooperative movements and strong economy as it hosts around 20 financial institutes. The town's population was boosted by the Kalamwadi Hydroelectric project.

== Geography ==
Kasaba Sangaon is a small town located southeast to Kolhapur city in Southwest Maharashtra. By road, Kasaba Sangaon is 28 km south of Kolhapur. The nearest cities and towns within Kolhapur are Ichalkaranji (20 km), Kagal (6 km), Hupari (10 km)

== Climate ==
The climate is a blend of coastal climate and the inland climate of Maharashtra. The temperature ranges between 12 °C to 35 °C. The summers are much cooler but also much more humid compared to neighbouring inland cities.The weather is normally good for farming.

== History ==
Kasaba Sangaon has strong history of freedom fighters during the colonial times of India. Post independence, the villagers have established an education society and cooperative institutions to uplift the literacy rate and economical level in the town.

The 1600 year old Parshvanath Digambar Jain Mandir is also located here. This town celebrates many festivals of all religions and host the biggest carnivals in the region. The Mahalaxmi Yatra and Ladlesaheb Dargah Urs are some of the most prominent social celebrations of this town.

== Culture ==
The town has a mix of Jain, Brahmin, Lingayat, Maratha, Matang, Mahar and Muslim communities living together

== Places of interest ==
- Dadasaheb Magdum High school & Junior College
- Sonyacha Maal
- Five-Star MIDC
- Jain Mandir
- Shri Basveshwar Mandir
- Shivbhavani Mandir
- Shri Hanuman Mandir
- Swami Vivekanad English Medium School
- Datta mandir ( Dattaraki)
- Masjid
- Renuka Mata Mandir
- Ambabai Mandir
- Ganesh Mandir
- Vitthal Mandir
- Ram Mandir

== Economy ==
The town has an highly agrarian economy. Around 70% of land is under cultivation and sugarcane is major crop of the town. Dairy and vegetables are a major share for their daily incomes as the sugarcane revenue is annual basis. The village has strong economy due to its well-developed co-operative base. In the past few years, a Kagal Five Star MIDC has been developing. As the MIDC's major land share is from Kasaba Sangaon, the employment rate has been growing.

== Transportation ==
Kasaba Sangaon is around 20 km from Kolhapur. State and private run buses are available for commute between the two places. Transport is available by bus and car as well.

== Notable people ==
- Dr Shivram Bhoje
