= Board of Radiation and Isotope Technology =

Unit of the Department of Atomic Energy in India

Board of Radiation & Isotope Technology
Agency overview
- Formed: 1 March 1989; 37 years ago
- Jurisdiction: Indian government
- Headquarters: Navi Mumbai
- Employees: Classified
- Agency executive: Pradip Mukherjee, Chief Executive
- Website: www.britatom.gov.in

The Board of Radiation and Isotope Technology (BRIT) is a unit of the Department of Atomic Energy, with its headquarters in Navi Mumbai, India. The unit of the Department of Atomic Energy (DAE) is focused on developing applications for radio isotope and radiation technology.

BRIT has worked with the research program at Bhabha Atomic Research Centre (BARC) and with nuclear power plants for generating electricity by Nuclear Power Corporation of India Limited (NPCIL). The unit's pharmaceuticals and laboratories are located at the BRIT/BARC Vashi Complex in Navi Mumbai. BRIT has six regional centres located in Bengaluru, Delhi, Dibrugarh, Hyderabad, Kolkata and Kota.

Shri Pradip Mukherjee has been the Chief Executive of BRIT since 1 August 2019.
