= KAMINI =

Nuclear research reactor in India

Coordinates: 12°33′30″N 80°10′30″E

KAMINI (Kalpakkam Mini reactor) is a research reactor at the Indira Gandhi Center for Atomic Research (IGCAR) in Kalpakkam, India. It achieved criticality on October 29, 1996. It was designed and built jointly by IGCAR and the Bhabha Atomic Research Centre (BARC). It produces 30 kW of thermal energy at full power. KAMINI is cooled and moderated by light water, uses a beryllium oxide neutron reflector, and is fueled with uranium-233 metal produced by the thorium fuel cycle harnessed by the neighbouring FBTR reactor.

Following the shutdown of the Molten-Salt Reactor Experiment in 1969, KAMINI was the only reactor in the world designed specifically to use uranium-233 fuel until the completion of TMSR-LF1 in 2023. Use of the large thorium reserves to produce nuclear fuel is a key strategy of India's nuclear energy program.

== Construction ==
The KAlpakkam MINI reactor (KAMINI) was jointly designed and built by the Bhabha Atomic Research Centre (BARC) and the Indira Gandhi Centre for Atomic Research (IGCAR) to serve as India’s first U‑233–fueled research reactor. Civil works and installation began in the mid‑1990s within the Post‑Irradiation Examination Facility at Kalpakkam, with the reactor achieving first criticality on 29 October 1996 and reaching its nominal thermal power of 30 kW in September 1997.

== Structure and Core details ==
KAMINI is a pool‑type, light-water-moderated and cooled reactor centered on a stainless‑steel reactor tank housing plate‑type U‑233/Al alloy fuel elements arranged in a compact core. Demineralized water serves three functions-moderator, coolant, and biological shield, surrounding the core to absorb radiation and heat. The core is reflected on all sides by 200 mm of beryllium oxide, clad in Zircaloy‑2, to enhance neutron economy and flatten flux profiles.

Two cadmium-lined safety control plates slide vertically into the core tank for power regulation and rapid shutdown. These plates provide negative reactivity insertion in case of an emergency. The pool itself is housed within a reinforced‑concrete vault, further encased by ordinary and high‑density concrete walls, and backed by lead panels that form the biological shield. Three radial beam tubes penetrate the pool wall, each terminating in collimated ports for neutron radiography and detector calibration at fluxes up to 10¹² n cm⁻² s⁻¹. Additionally, KAMINI offers three dedicated irradiation sites, two thimble locations and one pneumatic fast‑transfer system (PFTS) for neutron activation analysis, physics experiments, and materials testing.
