= BHAVINI =

Indian nuclear power company

Bharatiya Nabhikiya Vidyut Nigam Limited
- Native name: भारतीय नाभिकीय विद्युत निगम लिमिटेड
- Type: Public Sector Undertaking
- Industry: Energy
- Founded: Chennai, Tamil Nadu, India (22 October 2003)
- Headquarters: DAE Nodal Centre, Dr. Ambedkar Road, Pallavaram – Cantonment, Chennai – 600 043., Chennai, Tamil Nadu, India
- Key people: Chairman and managing director – Dr. K. V. Suresh Kumar D M Jagadeeesh Director ( Constructions) & Project Director K Dinesh Director ( Technical) & Station Director
- Products: Nuclear power and electricity generation and distribution
- Operating income: ▲₹111.0 million (US$1.2 million) (2016–2017)
- Net income: ▲₹194.2 million (US$2.0 million) (2016–2017)
- Total assets: ▲₹56.98 billion (US$590 million) (2016–2017)
- Total equity: ▲₹30.47 billion (US$320 million) (2016–2017)
- Website: bhavini.nic.in

The Bharatiya Nabhikiya Vidyut Nigam Limited (BHAVINI) is a wholly owned Enterprise of Government of India under the administrative control of the Department of Atomic Energy incorporated on 22 October 2003 as a Public Limited Company under the Companies Act, 1956 with the objective of constructing and commissioning the first 500 MWe Fast Breeder Reactor (FBR) at Kalpakkam in Tamil Nadu and to pursue construction, commissioning, operation and maintenance of subsequent Fast Breeder Reactors for generation of electricity in pursuance of the schemes and programmes of Government of India under the provisions of the Atomic Energy Act, 1962. BHAVINI is currently constructing a 500MWe Prototype Fast Breeder Reactor at Kalpakkam, 70 km from Chennai.

BHAVINI is administered by the Department of Atomic Energy. Once the first fast breeder reactor, called Prototype Fast Breeder Reactor goes into commercial power production, BHAVINI will be the second power utility in India after Nuclear Power Corporation of India, to use nuclear fuel sources to generate power.

BHAVINI commissions world’s first Hydrogen generation plant based on Copper–chlorine cycle using FBTR's heat. The patent belongs to ONGC Energy Centre Trust.

== See also ==
- Prototype Fast Breeder Reactor
- FBR-600
- Indira Gandhi Centre for Atomic Research
- Nuclear Power Corporation of India
- Nuclear power in India
