= Breeder reactor =

Nuclear reactor generating more fissile material than it consumes

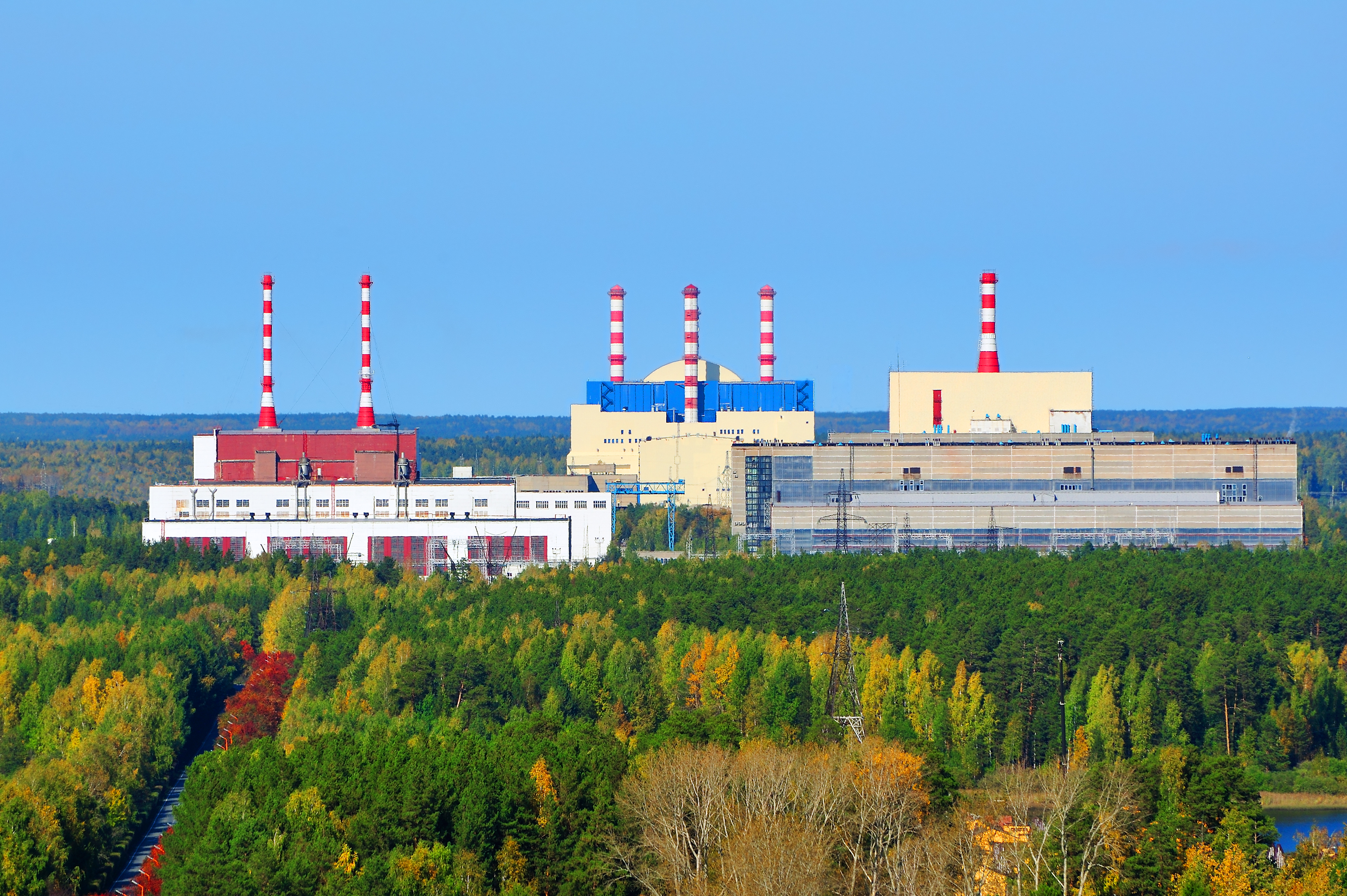
The Beloyarsk Nuclear Power Station, site of the BN-600 and BN-800, the only two commercially operational breeder reactors as of 2026

A breeder reactor is a nuclear reactor that generates more fissile material than it consumes. These reactors can be fueled with more commonly available isotopes of uranium and thorium, such as uranium-238 and thorium-232, as opposed to the rare uranium-235 which is used in conventional reactors. These materials are called fertile materials since they can be bred into fuel by these breeder reactors.

Breeder reactors achieve this because their neutron economy is high enough to create more fissile fuel than they use. These extra neutrons are absorbed by the fertile material that is loaded into the reactor along with fissile fuel. This irradiated fertile material in turn transmutes into fissile material which can undergo fission reactions.

Breeders were at first found attractive because they made more complete use of uranium fuel than light-water reactors, but interest declined after the 1960s as more uranium reserves were found and new methods of uranium enrichment reduced fuel costs.

Breeder reactors have been developed and operated in Russia, India, Japan, the United States, France, and China, but only Russia is currently operating a commercial fast breeder reactor as of April 2026.

== Types ==
Production of heavy transuranic actinides in current thermal-neutron fission reactors through neutron capture and decays. Starting at uranium-238, isotopes of plutonium, americium, and curium are all produced. In a fast neutron-breeder reactor, all these isotopes may be burned as fuel.

Many types of breeder reactor are possible:

A "breeder" is simply a nuclear reactor designed for very high neutron economy with an associated conversion ratio higher than 1.0. In principle, almost any reactor design could be tweaked to become a breeder. For example, the reduced-moderation water reactor concept uses mixed-oxide fuel in a tight lattice to increase the conversion ratio.

Aside from water-cooled, there are many other types of breeder reactor currently envisioned as possible. These include molten-salt cooled, gas cooled, and liquid-metal cooled designs in many variations. Almost any of these basic design types may be fueled by uranium, plutonium, many minor actinides, or thorium, and they may be designed for many different goals, such as creating more fissile fuel, long-term steady-state operation, or active burning of nuclear wastes.

Extant reactor designs are sometimes divided into two broad categories based upon their neutron spectrum, which generally separates those designed to use primarily uranium and transuranics from those designed to use thorium and avoid transuranics. These designs are:

- Fast breeder reactors (FBRs) which use 'fast' (i.e. unmoderated) neutrons to breed fissile plutonium (and possibly higher transuranics) from fertile uranium-238. The fast spectrum is flexible enough that it can also breed fissile uranium-233 from thorium, if desired.
- Thermal breeder reactors which use 'thermal-spectrum' or 'slow' (i.e. moderated) neutrons to breed fissile uranium-233 from thorium. Due to the behavior of the various nuclear fuels, a thermal breeder is thought commercially feasible only with thorium fuel, which avoids the buildup of the heavier transuranics.

=== Fast breeder reactor ===
Schematic diagram showing the difference between the Loop and Pool types of LMFBR

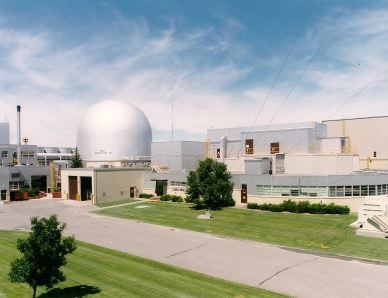
Experimental Breeder Reactor II, which served as the prototype for the Integral Fast Reactor

As of 2026 all large-scale FBR power stations are sodium cooled liquid metal fast breeder reactors (LMFBR) of one of the following two designs:

- Loop type, in which the primary coolant is circulated through primary heat exchangers outside the reactor tank (but inside the biological shield due to radioactive ^{24}Na in the primary coolant)
- Pool type, in which the primary heat exchangers and pumps are immersed in the reactor tank

There are only two commercially operating breeder reactors as of 2017: the BN-600 reactor, at 560 MWe, and the BN-800 reactor, at 880 MWe. Both are Russian sodium-cooled reactors. The designs use liquid metal as the primary coolant, to transfer heat from the core to steam used to power the electricity generating turbines.

FBRs cooled by liquid metals other than sodium have been built. Some early FBRs such as Clementine used mercury. Lead-cooled fast reactors have also been constructed, as well as other experimental reactors using lead–bismuth eutectic or a sodium–potassium alloy. Mercury and NaK have the advantage that they are liquids at room temperature, which is convenient for experimental rigs but less important for pilot or full-scale power stations, where their chemical toxicity and cost respectively leave them as less attractive options. The Soviet Union used lead–bismuth coolant in some naval reactors. BREST-OD-300 is a later Russian design that uses lead coolant. Its first concrete was poured in June 2021. The SVBR-100 design specifies lead–bismuth eutectic as its coolant.

Three of the proposed generation IV reactor types use a fast-neutron spectrum:

- Gas-cooled fast reactor cooled by helium
- Sodium-cooled fast reactor based on the existing LMFBR and integral fast reactor designs
- Lead-cooled fast reactor based on Soviet naval propulsion units

Fast reactors are not necessarily breeders. For example, sodium-cooled fast reactors can operate as transmuters, converters or breeders.

Mixed-oxide fuel combines uranium dioxide and plutonium dioxide. Its plutonium content depends on the reactor design and may vary across the core. Another fuel option is metal alloys, typically a blend of uranium, plutonium, and zirconium (used because it is "transparent" to neutrons). Enriched uranium can be used on its own.

Many designs surround the reactor core in a blanket of tubes that contain non-fissile uranium-238, which, by capturing fast neutrons from the reaction in the core, converts to fissile plutonium-239 (as is some of the uranium in the core), which is then reprocessed and used as nuclear fuel. Other FBR designs rely on the geometry of the fuel (which also contains uranium-238), arranged to attain sufficient fast neutron capture. The plutonium-239 (or the fissile uranium-235) fission cross-section is much smaller in a fast spectrum than in a thermal spectrum, as is the ratio between the ^{239}Pu/^{235}U fission cross-section and the ^{238}U absorption cross-section. This increases the concentration of ^{239}Pu/^{235}U needed to sustain a chain reaction, as well as the ratio of breeding to fission.

On the other hand, a fast reactor needs no moderator to slow down the neutrons at all, taking advantage of the fast neutrons producing a greater number of neutrons per fission than slow neutrons. For this reason ordinary liquid water, being a moderator and neutron absorber, is an undesirable primary coolant for fast reactors. Because large amounts of water in the core are required to cool the reactor, the yield of neutrons and therefore breeding of ^{239}Pu are strongly affected. Theoretical work has been done on reduced moderation water reactors, which may have a sufficiently fast spectrum to provide a breeding ratio slightly over 1. This would likely result in an unacceptable power derating and high costs in a liquid-water-cooled reactor, but the supercritical water coolant of the supercritical water reactor (SCWR) has sufficient heat capacity to allow adequate cooling with less water, making a fast-spectrum water-cooled reactor a practical possibility.

The type of coolant, temperature, and fast neutron spectrum puts the fuel cladding material (normally austenitic stainless or ferritic-martensitic steels) under extreme conditions. Understanding the radiation damage, coolant interactions, stresses, and temperatures are necessary for the safe operation of any reactor core. All materials used to date in sodium-cooled fast reactors have known limits. Oxide dispersion-strengthened alloy steel is viewed as the long-term radiation resistant fuel-cladding material that can overcome the shortcomings of today's material choices.

==== Integral fast reactor ====
One design of fast neutron reactor, specifically conceived to address the waste disposal and plutonium issues, was the integral fast reactor (IFR, also known as an integral fast breeder reactor, although the original reactor was designed to not breed a net surplus of fissile material).

The IFR concept included on-site pyroprocessing to recycle used fuel. The remaining waste would not consist solely of short-lived fission products. Long-lived fission products such as technetium-99 and iodine-129 remain important for disposal, and pyroprocessing also generates waste streams containing salts and fuel cladding. Some fission products could later be separated for industrial or medical uses and the rest sent to a waste repository. The IFR pyroprocessing system uses molten cadmium cathodes and electrorefiners to reprocess metallic fuel directly on-site at the reactor. Such systems co-mingle all the minor actinides with both uranium and plutonium. The systems are compact and self-contained, so that no plutonium-containing material needs to be transported away from the site of the breeder reactor. Breeder reactors incorporating such technology would most likely be designed with breeding ratios very close to 1.00, so that after an initial loading of enriched uranium and/or plutonium fuel, the reactor would then be refueled only with small deliveries of natural uranium. A quantity of natural uranium equivalent to a block about the size of a milk crate delivered once per month would be all the fuel such a 1 gigawatt reactor would need. The integral fast reactor concept combines a fast reactor with fuel recycling. The project was canceled in 1994 by United States Secretary of Energy Hazel O'Leary.

==== Other fast reactors ====
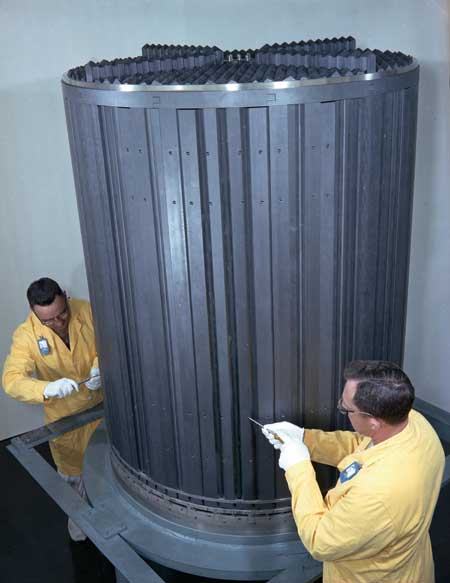
The graphite core of the Molten Salt Reactor Experiment

The first fast reactor built and operated was the Los Alamos Plutonium Fast Reactor ("Clementine") in Los Alamos, New Mexico. Clementine was fueled by gallium-stabilized delta-phase plutonium and cooled with mercury. It contained a 'window' of thorium-232 in anticipation of breeding experiments, but no reports were made available regarding this feature.

Another proposed fast reactor is a fast molten salt reactor, in which the molten salt's moderating properties are insignificant. This is typically achieved by replacing the light metal fluorides (e.g. LiF, BeF_{2}) in the salt carrier with heavier metal chlorides (e.g., KCl, RbCl, ZrCl_{4}).

Several prototype FBRs have been built, ranging in electrical output from a few light bulbs' equivalent (EBR-I, 1951) to over 1 GWe. As of 2006, the technology is not economically competitive to thermal reactor technology, but India, Japan, China, South Korea, and Russia are all committing substantial research funds to further development of fast breeder reactors, anticipating that rising uranium prices will change this in the long term. Germany, in contrast, abandoned the technology due to safety concerns. The SNR-300 fast breeder reactor was completed in 1985 but did not obtain authorization to start up. The project was cancelled in March 1991.

=== Thermal breeder reactor ===
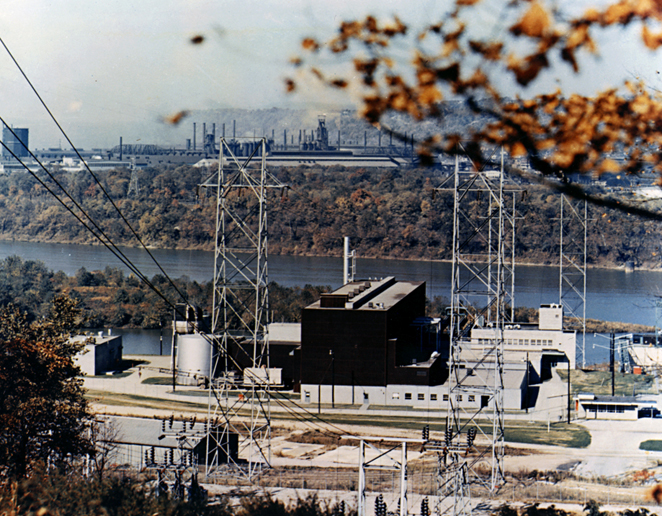
The Shippingport Reactor, used as a prototype light water breeder for five years beginning in August 1977

The advanced heavy-water reactor is one of the few proposed large-scale uses of thorium. The IAEA's 2019 report lists about 846,500 tonnes of thorium in India's monazite deposits, based on 2010–2011 estimates. This total includes identified and undiscovered resources.

The third and final core of the Shippingport Atomic Power Station 60 MWe reactor was a light water thorium breeder, which began operating in 1977. It used pellets made of thorium dioxide and uranium-233 oxide; initially, the U-233 content of the pellets was 5–6% in the seed region, 1.5–3% in the blanket region, and none in the reflector region. It operated at 236 MWt, generating 60 MWe, and ultimately produced over 2.1 billion kilowatt hours of electricity. After five years, the core was removed and found to contain nearly 1.4% more fissile material than when it was installed, demonstrating that breeding from thorium had occurred.

A liquid fluoride thorium reactor is also planned as a thorium thermal breeder. Liquid-fluoride reactors may have attractive features, such as inherent safety, no need to manufacture fuel rods, and possibly simpler reprocessing of the liquid fuel. This concept was first investigated at the Oak Ridge National Laboratory Molten-Salt Reactor Experiment in the 1960s. From 2012 it became the subject of renewed interest worldwide.

== Fuel resources ==
Breeder reactors could, in principle, extract almost all of the energy contained in uranium or thorium, decreasing fuel requirements by a factor of 100 compared to widely used once-through light water reactors, which extract less than 1% of the energy in the actinide metal (uranium or thorium) mined from the earth. The high fuel-efficiency of breeder reactors could greatly reduce concerns about fuel supply, energy used in mining, and storage of radioactive waste. With seawater uranium extraction (currently too expensive to be economical), there is enough fuel for breeder reactors to satisfy the world's energy needs for 5 billion years at 1983's total energy consumption rate, thus making nuclear energy effectively a renewable energy. In addition to seawater, the average crustal granite rocks contain significant quantities of uranium and thorium that with breeder reactors can supply abundant energy for the remaining lifespan of the sun on the main sequence of stellar evolution.

=== Nuclear waste ===
Actinides and fission products by half-life
Actinides by decay chain				Half-life range (a)	Fission products of ^{235}U by yield
4n (Thorium)	4n + 1 (Neptunium)	4n + 2 (Radium)	4n + 3 (Actinium)	Half-life range (a)	4.5–7%	0.04–1.25%	<0.001%
^{228}Ra^{№}				4–6 a		^{155}Eu^{þ}
^{248}Bk				> 9 a
^{244}Cm^{ƒ}	^{241}Pu^{ƒ}	^{250}Cf	^{227}Ac^{№}	10–29 a	^{90}Sr	^{85}Kr	^{113m}Cd^{þ}
^{232}U^{ƒ}		^{238}Pu^{ƒ}	^{243}Cm^{ƒ}	29–97 a	^{137}Cs	^{151}Sm^{þ}	^{121m}Sn
	^{249}Cf^{ƒ}	^{242m}Am^{ƒ}		141–351 a	No fission products have a half-life in the range of 100 a–210 ka ...
	^{241}Am^{ƒ}		^{251}Cf^{ƒ}	430–900 a	No fission products have a half-life in the range of 100 a–210 ka ...
		^{226}Ra^{№}	^{247}Bk	1.3–1.6 ka	No fission products have a half-life in the range of 100 a–210 ka ...
^{240}Pu	^{229}Th	^{246}Cm^{ƒ}	^{243}Am^{ƒ}	4.7–7.4 ka	No fission products have a half-life in the range of 100 a–210 ka ...
	^{245}Cm^{ƒ}	^{250}Cm		8.3–8.5 ka	No fission products have a half-life in the range of 100 a–210 ka ...
			^{239}Pu^{ƒ}	24.1 ka	No fission products have a half-life in the range of 100 a–210 ka ...
		^{230}Th^{№}	^{231}Pa^{№}	32–76 ka	No fission products have a half-life in the range of 100 a–210 ka ...
^{236}Np^{ƒ}	^{233}U^{ƒ}	^{234}U^{№}		150–250 ka	^{99}Tc^{₡}	^{126}Sn
^{248}Cm		^{242}Pu		327–375 ka		^{79}Se^{₡}
				1.33 Ma	^{135}Cs^{₡}
	^{237}Np^{ƒ}			1.61–6.5 Ma	^{93}Zr	^{107}Pd
^{236}U			^{247}Cm^{ƒ}	15–24 Ma		^{129}I^{₡}
^{244}Pu				80 Ma	... nor beyond 15.7 Ma
^{232}Th^{№}		^{238}U^{№}	^{235}U^{ƒ№}	0.7–14.1 Ga	... nor beyond 15.7 Ma
₡, has thermal neutron capture cross section in the range of 8–50 barns; ƒ, fissile; №, primarily a naturally occurring radioactive material (NORM); þ, neutron poison (thermal neutron capture cross section greater than 3k barns)

In broad terms, spent nuclear fuel has three main components. The first consists of fission products, the leftover fragments of fuel atoms after they have been split to release energy. Fission products come in dozens of elements and hundreds of isotopes, all of them lighter than uranium. The second main component of spent fuel is transuranics (atoms heavier than uranium), which are generated from uranium or heavier atoms in the fuel when they absorb neutrons but do not undergo fission. The actinide series on the periodic table runs from actinium to lawrencium and includes uranium as well as transuranic elements. The third and largest component is the remaining uranium which is around 98.25% uranium-238, 1.1% uranium-235, and 0.65% uranium-236. The U-236 comes from the non-fission capture reaction where U-235 absorbs a neutron but releases only a high energy gamma ray instead of undergoing fission.

The physical behavior of the fission products is markedly different from that of the actinides. In particular, fission products do not undergo fission and therefore cannot be used as nuclear fuel. Indeed, because fission products are often neutron poisons (absorbing neutrons that could be used to sustain a chain reaction), fission products are viewed as nuclear 'ashes' left over from consuming fissile materials. Furthermore, only seven long-lived fission product isotopes have half-lives longer than a hundred years, which makes their geological storage or disposal less problematic than for transuranic materials.

With increased concerns about nuclear waste, breeding fuel cycles came under renewed interest as they can reduce actinide wastes, particularly plutonium and minor actinides such as neptunium, americium and curium. Breeder reactors are designed to fission the actinide wastes as fuel and thus convert them to more fission products. For unreprocessed uranium-oxide spent nuclear fuel, Bodansky's 2006 review described a rapid initial decrease in radioactivity as short-lived fission products decay, followed by a more gradual decrease as actinides decay.

Today's commercial light-water reactors do breed some new fissile material, mostly in the form of plutonium. Because commercial reactors were never designed as breeders, they do not convert enough uranium-238 into plutonium to replace the uranium-235 consumed. Nonetheless, at least one-third of the power produced by commercial nuclear reactors comes from fission of plutonium generated within the fuel. Even with this level of plutonium consumption, light water reactors consume only part of the plutonium and minor actinides they produce, and nonfissile isotopes of plutonium build up, along with significant quantities of other minor actinides.

Since breeder reactors on a closed fuel cycle would use nearly all of the isotopes of these actinides fed into them as fuel, their fuel requirements would be reduced by a factor of about 100.

Waste volume alone does not determine disposal requirements. A 2023 DOE assessment identified radionuclide inventory, heat output, chemical and physical properties, and packaging as relevant factors. For a given total heat output, reducing waste volume increases heat density; the space required in a repository also depends on the host rock and its temperature limits.

Radioactivity is not the same as the dose potentially received from a waste repository. A 2023 DOE assessment noted that waste radiotoxicity is strongly linked to actinide content, while mobile, long-lived fission and activation products can be important contributors to repository dose. Under typical repository conditions, actinides move more slowly than these products.

In principle, breeder fuel cycles can recycle and consume all actinides, leaving only fission products. The table illustrates the gap between medium-lived and long-lived fission products. A 2015 measurement put the half-life of samarium-151, one of the medium-lived fission products, at 94.6±0.6 years. As a result of this physical oddity, after several hundred years in storage, the activity of the radioactive waste from an FBR would quickly drop to the low level of the long-lived fission products. However, to obtain this benefit requires the highly efficient separation of transuranics from spent fuel. If the fuel reprocessing methods used leave a large fraction of the transuranics in the final waste stream, this advantage would be greatly reduced.

The FBR's fast neutrons can fission actinide nuclei with even numbers of both protons and neutrons. Such nuclei usually lack the low-speed "thermal neutron" resonances of fissile fuels used in LWRs. The thorium fuel cycle inherently produces lower levels of heavy actinides. The fertile material in the thorium fuel cycle has an atomic weight of 232, while the fertile material in the uranium fuel cycle has an atomic weight of 238. That mass difference means that thorium-232 requires six more neutron capture events per nucleus before the transuranic elements can be produced. In addition to this simple mass difference, the reactor gets two chances to fission the nuclei as the mass increases: First as the effective fuel nuclei U233, and as it absorbs two more neutrons, again as the fuel nuclei U235.

Breeders aim to produce more fissile material than they consume. Burners aim to consume actinides by incorporating them into the core fuel and not adding a breeding blanket.

== Design ==
Fission probabilities of selected actinides, thermal vs. fast neutrons. The percentages of thermal and fast fission indicate the fraction of nuclei fissioned when hit by a respective neutron. The remainder undergoes neutron capture.
Isotope	Thermal fission cross section	Thermal fission %	Fast fission cross section	Fast fission %
Th-232	53.71 microbarn	1 n	79.94 millibarn	3 n
U-232	76.52 barn	59	2.063 barn	95
U-233	531.3 barn	89	1.908 barn	93
U-235	585.1 barn	81	1.218 barn	80
U-238	16.8 microbarn	1 n	306.4 millibarn	11
Np-237	20.19 millibarn	3 n	1.336 barn	27
Pu-238	17.77 barn	7	1.968 barn	70
Pu-239	747.4 barn	63	1.802 barn	85
Pu-240	36.21 millibarn	1 n	1.328 barn	55
Pu-241	1012 barn	75	1.626 barn	87
Pu-242	2.436 millibarn	1 n	1.151 barn	53
Am-241	3.122 barn	1 n	1.395 barn	21
Am-242m	6401 barn	75	1.834 barn	94
Am-243	81.58 millibarn	1 n	1.081 barn	23
Cm-242	4.665 barn	1 n	1.775 barn	10
Cm-243	587.4 barn	78	2.432 barn	94
Cm-244	1.022 barn	4 n	1.733 barn	33
n=non-fissile

=== Conversion ratio ===
One measure of a reactor's performance is the "conversion ratio", defined as the ratio of new fissile atoms produced to fissile atoms consumed. All proposed nuclear reactors except specially designed and operated actinide burners experience some degree of conversion. As long as there is any amount of a fertile material within the neutron flux of the reactor, some new fissile material is always created. When the conversion ratio is greater than 1, it is often called the "breeding ratio".

For example, commonly used light water reactors have a conversion ratio of approximately 0.6. Pressurized heavy-water reactors running on natural uranium have a conversion ratio of 0.8. In a breeder reactor, the conversion ratio is higher than 1. "Break-even" is achieved when the conversion ratio reaches 1.0 and the reactor produces as much fissile material as it uses.

=== Doubling time ===
The doubling time is the amount of time it would take for a breeder reactor to produce enough new fissile material to replace the original fuel and additionally produce an equivalent amount of fuel for another nuclear reactor. This was considered an important measure of breeder performance in early years, when uranium was thought to be scarce. However, since uranium is more abundant than thought in the early days of nuclear reactor development, and given the amount of plutonium available in spent reactor fuel, doubling time has become a less important metric in modern breeder-reactor design.

=== Burnup ===
"Burnup" is a measure of how much energy has been extracted from a given mass of heavy metal in fuel, often expressed (for power reactors) in terms of gigawatt-days per ton of heavy metal. Burnup is an important factor in determining the types and abundances of isotopes produced by a fission reactor. Burnup is distinct from the conversion or breeding ratio. A 2003 study of reduced-moderation water reactor fuel assemblies reported a configuration with an average core burnup of 38.2 GWd/t and a conversion ratio of 1.0, and another with 45 GWd/t and a conversion ratio of 0.97.

In the past, breeder-reactor development focused on reactors with low breeding ratios, from 1.01 for the Shippingport Reactor running on thorium fuel and cooled by conventional light water to over 1.2 for the Soviet BN-350 liquid-metal-cooled reactor. Theoretical models of breeders with liquid sodium coolant flowing through tubes inside fuel elements ("tube-in-shell" construction) suggest breeding ratios of at least 1.8 are possible on an industrial scale. The Soviet BR-1 test reactor achieved a breeding ratio of 2.5 under non-commercial conditions.

=== Reprocessing ===
Fission of the nuclear fuel in any reactor unavoidably produces neutron-absorbing fission products. The fertile material from a breeder reactor then needs to be reprocessed to remove those neutron poisons. This step is required to fully utilize the ability to breed as much or more fuel than is consumed. All reprocessing can present a proliferation concern, since it can extract weapons-usable material from spent fuel. The most common reprocessing technique, PUREX, presents a particular concern since it was expressly designed to separate plutonium. Early proposals for the breeder-reactor fuel cycle posed an even greater proliferation concern because they would use PUREX to separate plutonium in a highly attractive isotopic form for use in nuclear weapons.

Several countries are developing reprocessing methods that do not separate the plutonium from the other actinides. For instance, the non-water-based pyrometallurgical electrowinning process, when used to reprocess fuel from an integral fast reactor, leaves large amounts of radioactive actinides in the reactor fuel. More conventional water-based reprocessing systems include SANEX, UNEX, DIAMEX, COEX, and TRUEX, and proposals to combine PUREX with those and other co-processes. All these systems have moderately better proliferation resistance than PUREX, though their adoption rate is low.

In the thorium cycle, thorium-232 breeds by converting first to protactinium-233, which then decays to uranium-233. If the protactinium remains in the reactor, small amounts of uranium-232 are also produced, which has the strong gamma emitter thallium-208 in its decay chain. Similar to uranium-fueled designs, the longer the fuel and fertile material remain in the reactor, the more of these undesirable elements build up. In the envisioned commercial thorium reactors, high levels of uranium-232 would be allowed to accumulate, leading to extremely high gamma-radiation doses from any uranium derived from thorium. These gamma rays complicate the safe handling of a weapon and the design of its electronics; this explains why uranium-233 has never been pursued for weapons beyond proof-of-concept demonstrations.

While the thorium cycle may be proliferation-resistant with regard to uranium-233 extraction from fuel (because of the presence of uranium-232), it poses a proliferation risk from an alternate route of uranium-233 extraction, which involves chemically extracting protactinium-233 and allowing it to decay to pure uranium-233 outside of the reactor. This process is an obvious chemical operation which is not required for normal operation of these reactor designs, but it could feasibly happen beyond the oversight of organizations such as the International Atomic Energy Agency (IAEA), and thus must be safeguarded against.

== Production ==
Like many aspects of nuclear power, fast breeder reactors have been subject to much controversy over the years. In 2010 the International Panel on Fissile Materials said "After six decades and the expenditure of the equivalent of tens of billions of dollars, the promise of breeder reactors remains largely unfulfilled and efforts to commercialize them have been steadily cut back in most countries". In Germany, the United Kingdom, and the United States, breeder reactor development programs have been abandoned. The rationale for pursuing breeder reactors—sometimes explicit and sometimes implicit—was based on the following key assumptions:

- It was expected that uranium would be scarce and high-grade deposits would quickly become depleted if fission power were deployed on a large scale; the reality, however, is that since the end of the Cold War, uranium has been much cheaper and more abundant than early designers expected.
- Breeder reactors were expected to become economically competitive with light-water reactors. In 2010, Thomas B. Cochran and colleagues reported that demonstration sodium-cooled fast reactors had typically cost more than twice as much per kilowatt of generating capacity as similarly sized water-cooled reactors. They noted that this cost gap might narrow with production, but wrote that few experts anticipated a capital-cost premium below 25%.
- It was thought that breeder reactors could be as safe and reliable as light-water reactors, but safety issues are cited as a concern with fast reactors that use a sodium coolant, where a leak could lead to a sodium fire.
- It was expected that the proliferation risks posed by breeders and their "closed" fuel cycle, in which plutonium would be recycled, could be managed. But since plutonium-breeding reactors produce plutonium from U238, and thorium reactors produce fissile U233 from thorium, all breeding cycles could theoretically pose proliferation risks. However U-232, which is always present in U-233 produced in breeder reactors, is a strong gamma-emitter via its daughter products, and would make weapon handling extremely hazardous and the weapon easy to detect.

The 2013 documentary Pandora's Promise presents the integral fast reactor as an alternative to fossil-fuel power, with commentary from former Argonne managers Len Koch and Chuck Till. Recycling nevertheless leaves radioactive wastes requiring disposal, including long-lived fission products and wastes from fuel processing. According to the movie, one pound of uranium provides as much energy as 5,000 barrels of oil.

=== Notable reactors ===
Oak Ridge's Molten-Salt Reactor Experiment tested technology for later molten-salt breeder designs. It was not a breeder and did not demonstrate the thorium-232–uranium-233 breeding cycle.

Notable breeder reactors and related experiments
Reactor	Country when built	Started	Shut down	Net electrical output (MWe)	Gross electrical output (MWe)	Thermal output (MWt)	Reported electrical rating (basis unspecified)	Rating source and year	Capacity factor	Number of coolant leaks	Neutron temperature	Coolant	Reactor class
BN-800	Russia	2015	operating	820	885	2100	–	IAEA (2025)	73.4%	–	Fast	Sodium	Prototype/Commercial (Gen3)
BN-600	Soviet Union	1981	operating	560	600	1470	–	IAEA (2025)	74.2%	27	Fast	Sodium	Prototype/Commercial (Gen2)
CFR-600	China	2017	commissioning/2023	642	682	1882	–	IAEA (2025)	34%	27	Fast	Sodium	Commercial
PFBR	India	2004	operating	–	–	1253	500	–	–	–	Fast	Sodium	Prototype/Commercial (Gen3)
Phénix	France	1973 (grid connection)	2010	–	–	563	233 (design); 130 (final)	–	40.5%	31	Fast	Sodium	Prototype
BN-350	Soviet Union	1973	1999	–	–	750	350 (design); 52 (final)	–	43%	15	Fast	Sodium	Prototype
PFR	UK	1976	1994	–	–	650	234	–	26.9%	20	Fast	Sodium	Prototype
DFR	UK	1962	1977	–	–	65	14 (design); 11 (final)	–	34%	7	Fast	NaK	Test
China Experimental Fast Reactor	China	2012	operating	–	–	65	20 (design); 22 (final)	–	40%	8	Fast	Sodium	Test
FBTR	India	1985	operating	–	–	40	13	–	–	6	Fast	Sodium	Test
EBR-2	US	1964	1994	–	–	62.5	19	–	–	–	Fast	Sodium	Experimental/Test
FFTF	US	1982	1993	–	–	400	0	–	–	1	Fast	Sodium	Test
Jōyō	Japan	1977	2007 (suspended; restart planned as of February 2026)	–	–	150	0	–	–	–	Fast	Sodium	Test
Rapsodie	France	1967	1983	–	–	40	0	–	–	2	Fast	Sodium	Test
EBR-1	US	1951	1963	–	–	1.4	0.2	–	–	–	Fast	NaK	First Power Reactor
Monju	Japan	1995	2017	–	–	714	246	–	trial only	1	Fast	Sodium	Prototype
Fermi-1	US	1963	1972	–	–	200	66	–	–	–	Fast	Sodium	Prototype
KNK II	Germany	1977	1991	–	–	58	18 (design); 17 (final)	–	17.1%	21	Fast	Sodium	Research/Test
MSRE	US	1965	1969	–	–	7.4	0	–	–	–	Epithermal	Molten salt (FLiBe)	Test
Shippingport	US	1977 as breeder	1982	–	–	236	60	–	–	–	Thermal	Light Water	Experimental-Core3
Superphénix	France	1985	1998	–	–	3000	1200	–	7.9%	7	Fast	Sodium	Prototype/Commercial (Gen2)
SNR-300	Germany	1985 (completed)	1991 (cancelled)	–	–	–	327	–	non-nuclear tests only	–	Fast	Sodium	Prototype/Commercial
Clementine	US	1946	1952	–	–	0.025	0	–	–	–	Fast	Mercury	World's First Fast Reactor

The Soviet Union constructed a series of fast reactors, the first being mercury-cooled and fueled with plutonium metal, and the later plants sodium-cooled and fueled with plutonium oxide. BR-1 (1955) was 100W (thermal) was followed by BR-2 at 100 kW and then the 5 MW BR-5. BOR-60 (first criticality 1969) was 60 MW, with construction started in 1965.

== Future plants ==
=== India ===
India has been developing fast breeder reactors as part of its three-stage nuclear power programme. India's Prototype Fast Breeder Reactor at Kalpakkam reached first criticality on 6 April 2026. Its uranium–plutonium fuel cycle is separate from the programme's longer-term thorium plans.

BHAVINI, an Indian nuclear power company, was established in 2003 to construct, commission, and operate all stage II fast breeder reactors outlined in India's three-stage nuclear power programme. To advance these plans, the FBR-600 is a pool-type sodium-cooled reactor with a rating of 600 MWe.

=== China ===
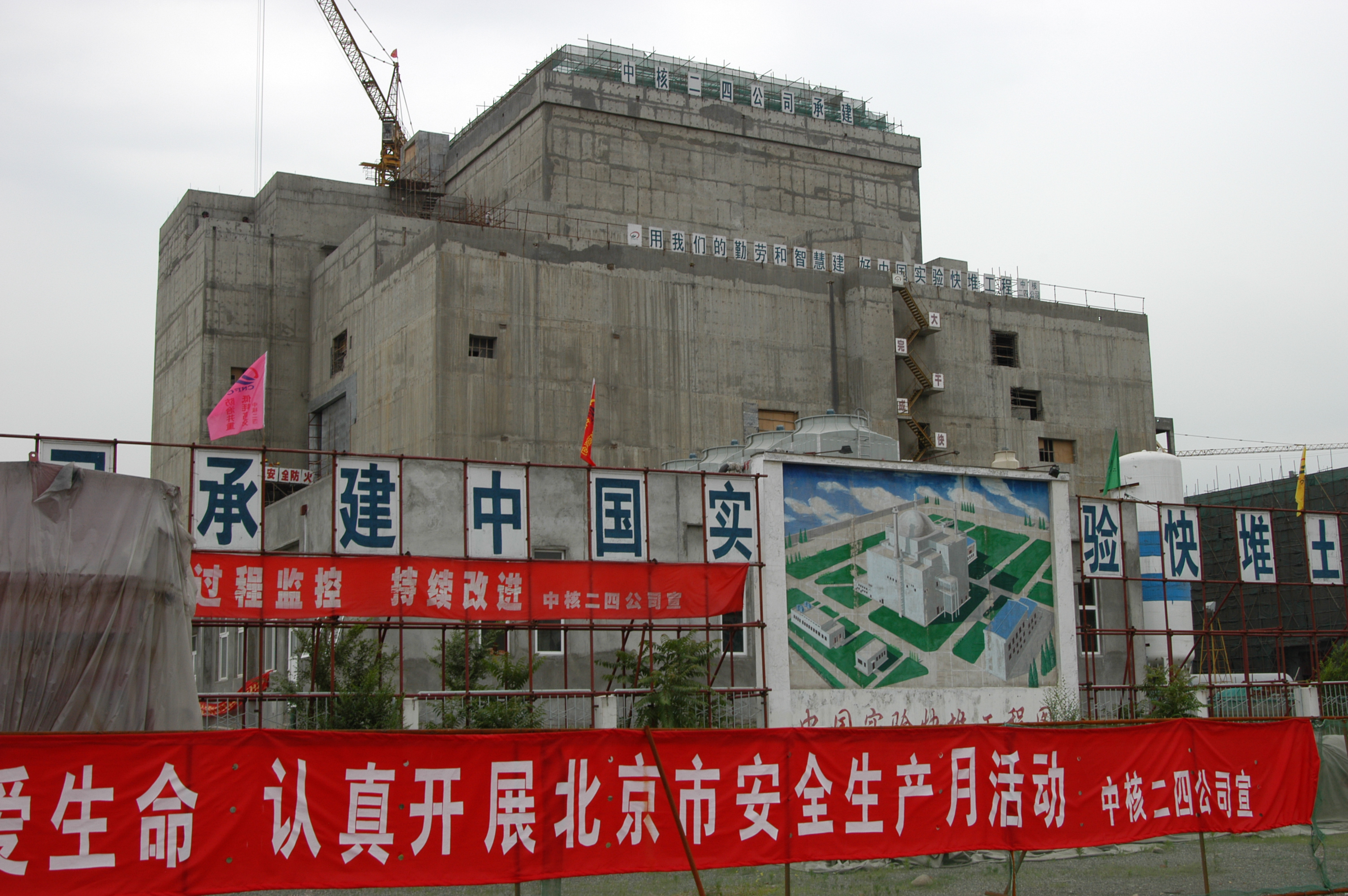
The Chinese Experimental Fast Reactor is a 65 MW (thermal), 20 MW (electric), sodium-cooled, pool-type reactor with a 30-year design lifetime and a target burnup of 100 MWd/kg.

China's Atomic Energy Authority rates the China Experimental Fast Reactor at 65 MW thermal and 20 MW electrical. It first reached criticality in 2010 and supplied electricity to the grid in 2011. China initiated a research and development project in thorium molten-salt thermal breeder-reactor technology (liquid fluoride thorium reactor), formally announced at the Chinese Academy of Sciences annual conference in 2011. Its ultimate target was to investigate and develop a thorium-based molten salt nuclear system over about 20 years.

In November 2025, the Chinese Academy of Sciences reported thorium-to-uranium fuel conversion in an experimental molten-salt reactor built by its Shanghai Institute of Applied Physics. The institute described a goal of demonstrating a 100-megawatt project by 2035.

=== South Korea ===
South Korea is developing a design for a standardized modular FBR for export, to complement the standardized pressurized water reactors and Canadian-developed CANDU reactors already built there, but has not yet committed to building a prototype.

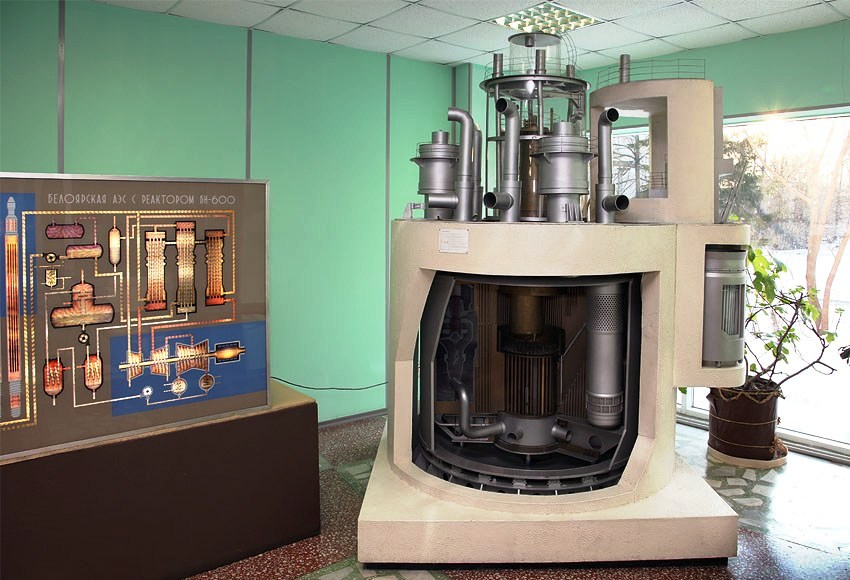
A cutaway model of the BN-600 reactor, superseded by the BN-800 reactor family

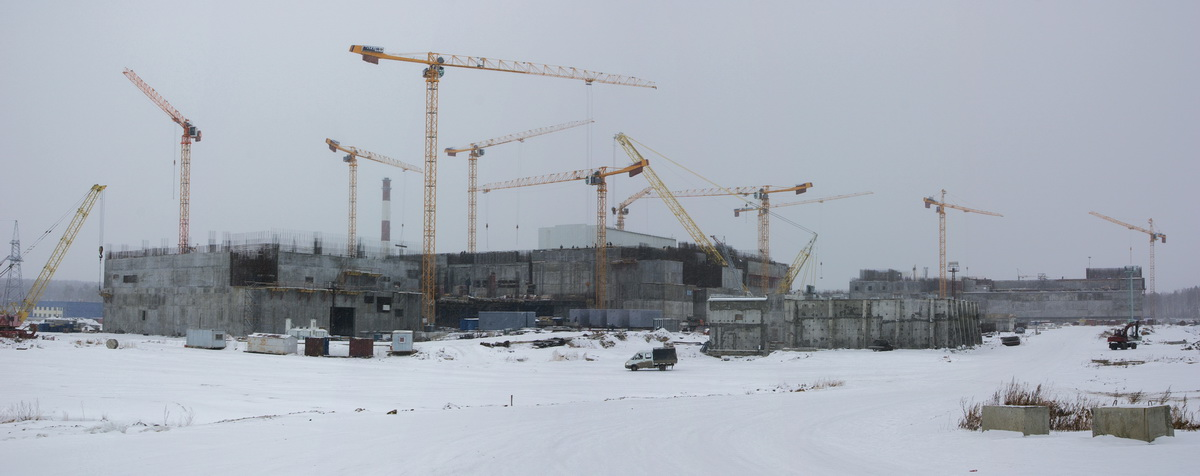
Construction of the BN-800 reactor

=== Russia ===
Russia has a plan for increasing its fleet of fast breeder reactors significantly. A BN-800 reactor (800 MWe) at Beloyarsk was completed in 2012, succeeding a smaller BN-600. It reached its full power production in 2016. Plans for the construction of a larger BN-1200 reactor (1,200 MWe) was scheduled for completion in 2018, with two additional BN-1200 reactors built by the end of 2030. However, in 2015 Rosenergoatom postponed construction indefinitely to allow fuel design to be improved after more experience of operating the BN-800 reactor, and among cost concerns.

In January 2026, Rosatom reported that preparations had begun for Beloyarsk Unit 5, using the BN-1200M sodium-cooled fast reactor.

Construction of the lead-cooled BREST-OD-300 reactor at the Siberian Chemical Combine in Seversk began in June 2021. The BREST (Russian: bystry reaktor so svintsovym teplonositelem, English: fast reactor with lead coolant) design is seen as a successor to the BN series and the 300 MWe unit at the SCC could be the forerunner to a 1,200 MWe version for wide deployment as a commercial power generation unit. The development program is as part of an Advanced Nuclear Technologies Federal Program 2010–2020 that seeks to exploit fast reactors for uranium efficiency while 'burning' radioactive substances that would otherwise be disposed of as waste. Its core would measure about 2.3 metres in diameter by 1.1 metres in height and contain 16 tonnes of fuel. The unit would be refuelled every year, with each fuel element spending five years in total within the core. Lead coolant temperature would be around 540 °C, giving a high efficiency of 43%, primary heat production of 700 MWt yielding electrical power of 300 MWe. The operational lifespan of the unit could be 60 years. The design was expected to be completed by NIKIET in 2014 for construction between 2016 and 2020. In January 2026, Rosatom reported that BREST-OD-300 remained under construction and that the metal shell of its central reactor cavity had been installed during 2025.

=== Japan ===
In 2006 the United States, France, and Japan signed an "arrangement" to research and develop sodium-cooled fast reactors in support of the Global Nuclear Energy Partnership. In 2007 the Japanese government selected Mitsubishi Heavy Industries as the "core company in FBR development in Japan". Shortly thereafter, Mitsubishi FBR Systems was launched to develop and eventually sell FBR technology.

A 2024 technical review by Mitsubishi Heavy Industries described the revised Japanese roadmap: conceptual design and research on a demonstration sodium-cooled fast reactor were planned for fiscal 2024–2028, with a decision on basic design and licensing around fiscal 2028. MHI had been selected as the project's lead company in July 2023.

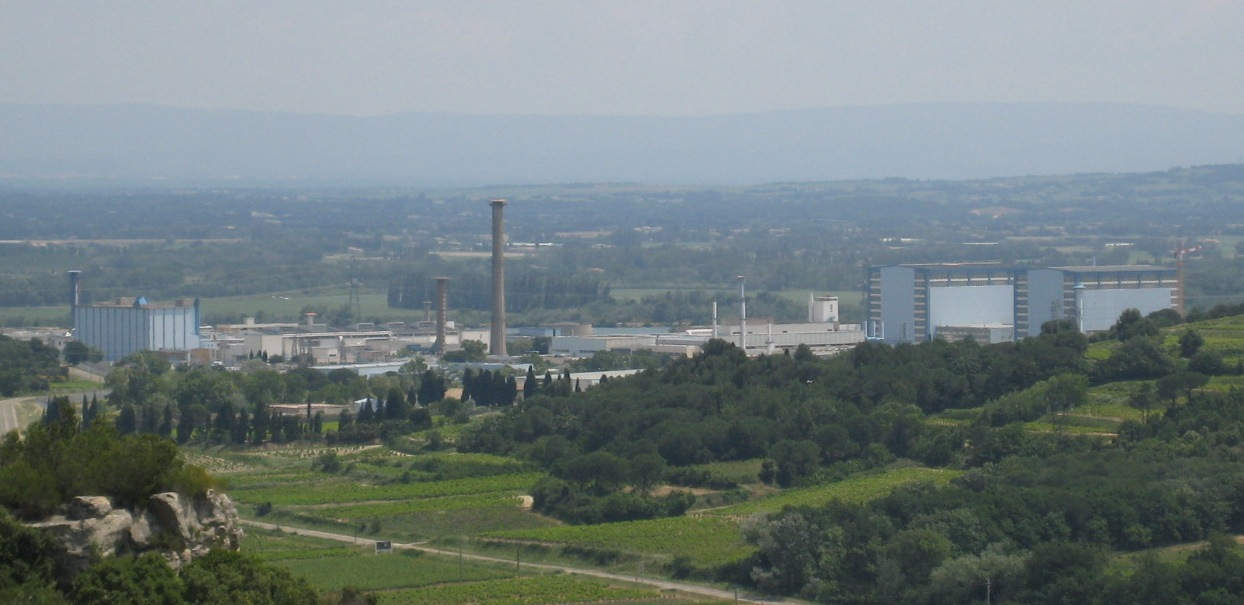
The Marcoule Nuclear Site in France, location of the Phénix (on the left)

=== France ===
In 2010 the French government allocated €651.6 million to the Commissariat à l'énergie atomique to finalize the design of ASTRID (Advanced Sodium Technological Reactor for Industrial Demonstration), a 600 MW fourth-generation reactor design to be finalized in 2020. As of 2013 the UK had shown interest in the PRISM reactor and was working in concert with France to develop ASTRID. In 2019, CEA announced this design would not be built before mid-century.

=== United States ===
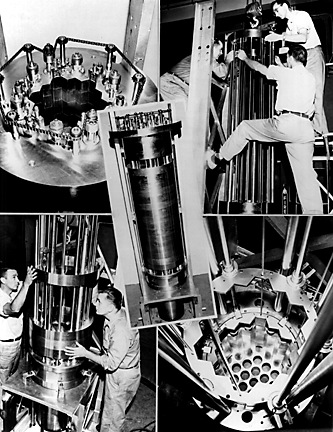
Assembly of the core of Experimental Breeder Reactor I in Idaho, United States, 1951

Kirk Sorensen, former NASA scientist and chief nuclear technologist at Teledyne Brown Engineering, has long been a promoter of thorium fuel cycle and particularly liquid fluoride thorium reactors. In 2011, Sorensen founded Flibe Energy, a company aimed to develop 20–50 MW LFTR reactor designs to power military bases.

In October 2010 GE Hitachi Nuclear Energy signed a memorandum of understanding with the operators of the US Department of Energy's Savannah River Site, which should allow the construction of a demonstration plant based on the company's S-PRISM fast breeder reactor prior to the design receiving full Nuclear Regulatory Commission licensing approval. In October 2011 The Independent reported that the UK Nuclear Decommissioning Authority (NDA) and senior advisers within the Department for Energy and Climate Change (DECC) had asked for technical and financial details of PRISM, partly as a means of reducing the country's plutonium stockpile.

The traveling wave reactor proposed in a patent by Intellectual Ventures is a fast breeder reactor designed to not need fuel reprocessing during the decades-long lifetime of the reactor. The breed-burn wave in the TWR design does not move from one end of the reactor to the other but gradually from the inside out. Moreover, as the fuel's composition changes through nuclear transmutation, fuel rods are continually reshuffled within the core to optimize the neutron flux and fuel usage at any given point in time. Thus, instead of letting the wave propagate through the fuel, the fuel itself is moved through a largely stationary burn wave. This is contrary to many media reports, which have popularized the concept as a candle-like reactor with a burn region that moves down a stick of fuel. By replacing a static core configuration with an actively managed "standing wave" or "soliton" core, TerraPower's design avoids the problem of cooling a highly variable burn region. Under this scenario, the reconfiguration of fuel rods is accomplished remotely by robotic devices; the containment vessel remains closed during the procedure, and there is no associated downtime.

In a separate fast-reactor project, the NRC approved a construction permit for TerraPower's Natrium project at Kemmerer, Wyoming, in March 2026. The sodium-cooled fast reactor still required a separate operating licence before it could operate.

== See also ==
- Nuclear fusion–fission hybrid
- Fast Breeder Test Reactor
