= Atomic Energy Regulatory Board =

Board within the government of India

- Logo of the AERB

Agency overview
- Formed: 15 November 1983; 42 years ago
- Jurisdiction: Indian government
- Headquarters: Mumbai
- Employees: Classified
- Agency executive: Shri A.K. Balasubrahmanian, Chairman
- Website: www.aerb.gov.in

The Atomic Energy Regulatory Board (AERB) was constituted on 15 November 1983 by the President of India by exercising the powers conferred by Section 27 of the Atomic Energy Act, 1962 (33 of 1962) to carry out certain regulatory and safety functions under the Act. The regulatory authority of AERB is derived from the rules and notifications promulgated under the Atomic Energy Act, 1962, and the Environmental (Protection) Act, 1986. The headquarters is in Mumbai.

The mission of the board is to ensure that the use of ionizing radiation and nuclear energy in India does not cause undue risk to health and the environment. Currently, the Board consists of a full-time Chairman, an ex officio Member, three part-time Members, and a Secretary.

AERB is supported by the Safety Review Committee for Operating Plants (SARCOP), Safety Review Committee for Applications of Radiation (SARCAR) and Advisory Committees for Project Safety Review (ACPSRs) (e.g. Pressurized heavy-water reactor, light water reactor, Prototype Fast Breeder Reactor and waste management projects). ACPSRs recommend to AERB the issuance of authorizations at different stages of a plant of the Department of Atomic Energy (DAE), after reviewing the submissions made by the plant authorities based on the recommendations of the associated Design Safety Committees. The SARCOP carries out safety surveillance and enforces safety stipulations in the operating units of the DAE. The SARCAR recommends measures to enforce radiation safety in medical, industrial and research institutions which use radiation and radioactive sources.

AERB also receives advice from the Advisory Committee on Nuclear Safety (ACNS). ACNS is composed of experts from AERB, DAE, and institutions outside the DAE. ACNS provides recommendations on the safety codes, guides, and manuals for siting, design, construction, operation, quality assurance, and decommissioning/life extension of nuclear power plants, which were prepared by the advisory committees for each of these areas. It also advises the board on generic safety issues. ACNS examines and advice on any specific matter that are referred to it by AERB.

The administrative and regulatory framework governing this process utilizes a multi-tiered review system conducted by a nationwide panel of subject-matter experts. These reviewers are drawn from a diverse range of recognized academic institutions and governmental agencies, ensuring rigorous, objective, and expert-led oversight throughout the evaluation cycle.

== The Formation of AERB: Down the memory Lane ==
During the commissioning of Tarapur Atomic Power Station in 1969, the Department of Atomic Energy (DAE) set up a safety committee to receive advice on matters related to safety and to give clearance for first criticality and subsequent power operation of the station. A Design and Operations Review Committee was later constituted to monitor the safety aspects of TAPS operation independently. One of the ex-chiefs of AERB, Dr. A. Gopalakrishnan, had a difference of opinion with the DAE tsars and, after his retirement, he has been writing about AERB being a paper tiger controlled by nuclear-hungry DAE bosses. After Fukushima incident, the government of India is thinking of making AERB an independent regulatory authority to save face.

=== DAE Safety Review Committee (DAE-SRC) ===
DAE-SRC was set up on 3 February 1972 to offer advice to DAE on safety matters related to commissioning and operation of Unit-1 of Rajasthan Atomic Power Station. The experts for the Committee were drawn from within DAE. The Safety Committee appointed by Director, Power Projects Engineering Division on 15 December 1969 to prepare Safety Report for RAPS-1 was authorised by DAE to monitor the performance of commissioning tests and to make safety reviews till the attainment of commercial operation.
The formal regulatory review was consolidated with the reconstitution of SRC on 2 December 1975 to deal with major safety policies and issues in all the constituent units of DAE. SRC dealt with nearly all aspects related to the safety of operations in DAE units.

=== Recommendation to set up AERB ===
On 23 July 1979 Secretary, DAE constituted a Committee chaired by Dr. M.D. Karkhanawala, Chairman, DAE-SRC with Shri S.D. Soman the then Head, Health Physics Division as Member-Secretary to study "the existing terms of reference of SRC, its functions, the modalities of reporting by the Units as well as the impediments faced by the Committee". According to the notification setting up the committee, the review of the terms of reference and the working of the Safety Review Committee became necessary "to ensure that not only safety consciousness is inculcated, but that safe practices prevail in all the Units of the DAE including the public sector undertakings".
The Committee was asked to report on the specific functions and responsibilities of SRC in order to enable the DAE to discharge its obligations under the Atomic Energy Act in so far as all the units as well as the public sector undertakings of the Department are concerned.
The Committee was reconstituted on 18 February 1980 with Shri V.N. Meckoni, the then Director, Chemical Group, BARC as the Chairman and Shri S.D. Soman, the then Head, Health Physics Division as Member-Secretary. The Report of the Committee titled "Reorganization of Regulatory and Safety Functions" (February 1981) recommended "the creation of Atomic Energy Regulatory Board by the Atomic Energy Commission with powers to lay down safety standards and assist DAE in framing rules and regulations for enforcing regulatory and safety requirements envisaged under the Atomic Energy Act 1962". The Committee also recommended that AERB "should be a statutory body under the Act (if necessary by suitable amendment of the Act) to give AERB a legal basis".
The Committee stated that "in order to enable AERB to function effectively and exercise its authority in an independent manner it should be constituted by and reporting to the Atomic Energy Commission and should consist of senior persons from DAE as well as external members. In this manner public confidence in nuclear safety matter would be enhanced".
The current functions and powers of AERB are almost verbatim taken from the report of the committee. AERB was set up on 15 November 1983. A separate notification indicating the functions and responsibilities of DAE-SRC was issued simultaneously. AERB's functions included enforcement of provisions of radiological protection in the radiation installations outside the DAE. Professor A.K.De, formerly Director, Indian Institute of Technology, Bombay, was appointed the first Chairman of AERB.
A Committee set up on 21 March 1987 with Shri V.N. Meckoni as Chairman reviewed the functions and responsibilities of AERB. The Committee submitted its recommendations on 15 May 1987. These were accepted by the Government. As recommended by the Committee, DAE-SRC became a part of AERB as AERB-SRC and later as Safety Review Committee for Operating Plants (AERB-SARCOP). The functions and responsibilities of AERB were broadened considerably. Currently, AERB is carrying out its functions as per the original notification and in the light of the recommendations of the Meckoni Committee.

== Divisions and Directorates of AERB ==
AERB secretariat has Nine technical divisions & two supporting divisions. The heads and directors of divisions constitute the Executive Committee which meets periodically with Chairman, AERB and Executive Director, AERB to take decisions on important policy matters related to the management of the Secretariat of the Board. The different divisions of AERB are:

1. OPSD : Operating Plant Safety Division

2. NPSD : Nuclear Projects Safety Division

3. RSD : Radiological Safety Division

4. NSAD : Nuclear Safety Analysis Division

5. R&DD :Resources & Documentation Division

6. DRI: Directorate of Regulatory Inspection

7. DRA&C: Directorate of Regulatory Affairs & Communications

8. DRP&E: Directorate of Radiation Protection & Environment

9. SRI : Safety Research Institute, Kalpakkam

Support Division

1. Administration Division

2. Accounts Division

=== Operating Plants Safety Division (OPSD) ===
PRIMARY RESPONSIBILITIES

   *     Safety Review, safety Surveillance and licensing of operating Nuclear Power Plants, Research Reactors, fuel cycle facilities under operation and non-DAE BSM & NORM industries
   *     Administration of industrial safety under Factories Act in all nuclear power plants and fuel cycle facilities under operation
   *     Review of industrial, fire and occupational health safety aspects including industrial injuries and accidents in all nuclear power plants and fuel cycle facilities under operation
   *     Review of on-site and off-site emergency preparedness plans including chemical emergencies under Manufacture, Storage and Import of Hazardous Chemical (MSIHC) Rules
   *     Conducting Periodic Safety Review and Renewal of Authorization
   *     Licensing of the operating personnel and the management staff
   *     Review of nuclear security aspects in operating plant
   *     Regulatory Inspection and Enforcement in respect of all operating Nuclear Power Plants, Research Reactors, fuel cycle facilities under operation and non-DAE BSM & NORM industries
   *     Co-ordination with International Atomic Energy Agency (IAEA) for the International Nuclear Event Scale (INES) based reporting of events and for the Incident Reporting System (IRS) operated by IAEA/NEA
   *     Secretariat of SARCOP
   *     Review of safety performance w.r.t industrial and fire safety in all DAE units and reward the winning units with AERB safety awards
   *     Organize DAE Safety and Occupational Health professionals’ meet every year

=== Nuclear Projects Safety Division (NPSD) ===
PRIMARY RESPONSIBILITIES

- Safety Review and Assessment including physical protection aspects towards consenting for siting, design & construction and commissioning of Nuclear Facilities.
- Review of Industrial & Fire Safety and Occupational Health Safety aspects during siting, construction and commissioning of nuclear facilities.
- Regulatory Inspection during siting, construction and commissioning of nuclear facilities.
- Development of Regulatory safety documents related to siting, design, commissioning and quality assurance.

=== Radiological Safety Division (RSD) ===
PRIMARY RESPONSIBILITIES

  *   Licensing, Surveillance and Safety Review of Radiation Installations, Radiation Generating Equipment and Devices containing Radioactive Sources with respect to radiation safety
  *   Licensing, Surveillance and Safety Review of BRIT facilities, RAPPCOF, DAE accelerator and LASER facilities with respect to both radiation safety and industrial safety
  *   Implementation of Atomic Energy (Radiation Protection) Rules, 2004 and Atomic Energy (Safe Disposal of Radioactive Waste) Rules, 1987 in radiation facilities
  *   Implementation of Atomic Energy (Factories) Rules, 1996 in BRIT facilities, RAPPCOF, accelerator and LASER facilities
  *   Granting import/export permission and shipment approval for transport of radioactive consignments
  *   Secretariat for Safety Review Committee for Application of Radiation (SARCAR)

=== Nuclear Safety Analysis Division (NSAD) ===
PRIMARY RESPONSIBILITIES

   *     Probabilistic Safety Assessment.
   *     Deterministic Safety Analysis.
   *     Safety Review of Indian Nuclear Power Plants.
   *     Nuclear Regulatory Research.
   *     Independent Verifications.
   *     Reactor Physics Review

LIST OF PUBLICATIONS https://www.aerb.gov.in/images/PDF/nsadpublications.pdf

=== Resources & Documentation Division (R&DD) ===
PRIMARY RESPONSIBILITIES

   *     Regulatory Safety Documents Development & Publication
   *     Coordination for development of  IAEA standards in India (Member State)
   *     Management of Resources for AERB including:
           *             Human Resources
           *             Financial Planning
           *             Infrastructure for developing Regional Regulatory Centers
           *             Management Systems
   *     Promotion of Safety Research Projects
   *     Public outreach activities
   *     Monitoring and modifications of AERB website
   *     IT activities

=== Directorate of Regulatory Inspection (DRI) ===
Primary responsibilities

- Integrating, harmonizing and improving effectiveness and efficiencies of inspection activities of AERB
- Recommend measures to achieve synergy and convergence of purposes and resources for RI programme of AERB
- Coordination with safety review process for systematic collection of inputs for RI and providing outcomes
- Plan, coordinate and organise all types of RI (safety related as well security related: planned as well as special: announced as well as unannounced) at Nuclear, Radiation and other Industrial facilities under the purview of AERB
- Resource mobilisation for field inspections (Formulation of RI teams drawing officers and staff from various Divisions. RRCs, other external experts)
- Issue RI reports after harmonising the findings w.r.to their safety significance
- Review RI responses, identify the safety issues and forward to respective Division of AERB for further review and enforcement actions, as necessary
- Maintain database for all RIs observations, recommendations and issues based on RI findings and carry out periodic analysis for feedback and improvement in future inspections, safety review processes and developing RI indicators
- Follow-up all pending RI recommendations for satisfactory and time bound resolution and communicate them periodically to the consentee and respective Division of AERB for further review and enforcement actions
- Augmentation of RRCs and utilising them efficiently in the RI programme of AERB.
- Consider deployment of on-site AERB observers at Nuclear Facilities

=== Directorate of Regulatory Affairs & Communications (DRA&C) ===
PRIMARY RESPONSIBILITIES

- Peer review of regulatory functions of the Radiological Safety Division (RSD) of AERB and suggest measures for enhancing effectiveness in regulations
- Review and Redressal of Grievance /complaints and to enhance transparency and accountability
- Development of enforcement policy & strategies including imposition of penalties and formulate mechanism for its implementation by involving other Government agencies
- National cooperation/coordination in the field of safety matters and maintaining liaison with other agencies/regulatory bodies/TSOs for technical cooperation
- International cooperation/coordination and ensuring fulfillment of international obligations under existing/multilateral arrangements and commitments. Organizing international workshops/meetings
- Public communication and consultation in regulatory process, issue of press releases, conducting awareness programs on safety, publicity of regulatory decisions & actions
- Legal affairs of AERB and review of draft statutes and amendments
- Providing support in management of affairs of the Board

=== Directorate of Radiation Protection & Environment: DRP&E ===
PRIMARY RESPONSIBILITIES

   * Review and Assessment of Radiation Protection to Ensure Radiological Safety
            *      Requirements for Emergency Preparedness and Response (EPR) plans of Nuclear Power Plants and Radiation Facilities
            *      Radiological Impact on People and Environment
            *      Radiation Dose Apportionment for Nuclear Power Plants and Radiation Facilities
            *      Waste Management of Nuclear Power Plants and Radiation facilities
    
   - Provide technical and regulatory support to the nodal divisions in the above specialized field
   
   *     Developing infrastructure and resources for monitoring and assessing emergency response actions

=== Safety Research Institute (SRI), Kalpakkam ===
The major activities of SRI include research and development in areas of regulatory interest. Some of these areas are listed below:

==== I. Nuclear Plant Safety Studies ====
i) Reactor Physics Studies
ii) Seismic Studies § Severe Accident Analysis
iii) Database Creation in Component Failure Rate
iv) Reliability Analysis of safety systems of Nuclear Power Plants
v) Development of methodology of Probabilistic Safety Assessment

==== III. Environmental Safety Studies ====
i) Remote Sensing and Geographic Information System (RSGIS) Applications
ii) Hydro-geological Investigations
iii) Modeling of Radionuclide Migration in the Ground Environment
iv) Environmental Impacts of Nuclear Discharges on Entrained Organisms

==== IV. Regulatory Inspection ====
i) Services in the Regulatory Inspections of Radiation facilities in the Southern Region

The Atomic Energy Regulatory Board (AERB) maintains a structured mechanism for self-assessment and quality assurance, systematically evaluating the efficacy of its regulatory activities. This framework facilitates continuous organizational improvement by integrating internal experience feedback with established international regulatory best practices.

== Important persons ==
- A.K. Balasubrahmanian :Chairperson, AERB
- J. Koley: Executive Director-RO, AERB
