= Hupari =

- City
- Nickname: Silver City
- Location in Maharashtra, India
- Coordinates: 16.6231°N 74.3994°E
- Country: India
- State: Maharashtra
- District: Kolhapur

Government
  - Type: Municipal council

Population (2001)
  - Total: 28,229
- Time zone: UTC+5:30 (IST)
- Postal code: 416203
- Vehicle registration: MH09

Hupari is a town governed by a Municipal Council in the Kolhapur district of the Indian state of Maharashtra. It is located in Hatkanangle taluka.

Hupari is widely known as the "Silver City" due to its strong traditional base in silver ornament manufacturing. The town has a long-standing heritage of skilled artisans who specialise in crafting a variety of silver jewellery and decorative items. A significant portion of the local population is engaged in this industry, making Hupari one of the prominent centres for silver ornament production in India.

The silver industry in Hupari is largely based on family-run businesses, where craftsmanship is passed down through generations. The town produces items such as chains, bangles, and traditional ornaments that are supplied to markets across India. Their anklets are popular internationally after they were GI tagged in 2021.

Hupari is also home to the temple of Shri Ambabai (Mahalaxmi), which is an important religious site for local residents.

== Demographics ==
As of 2001 India census, Hupari had a population of 28,229. Males constituted 51% of the population, while females made up 49%.

The average literacy rate of Hupari was 70%, higher than the national average of 59.5%. Male literacy was 76%, and female literacy was 62%. Around 12% of the population was under six years of age.

As of 2016, there are about 30,000 homes, 80 per cent of whom are into silver ornament work.

== Economy ==
The economy of Hupari is predominantly driven by the silver ornament industry. The town has developed into a major hub for silver craftsmanship in Maharashtra, with numerous small-scale workshops and traders contributing to local employment and regional trade.
