= Department of Atomic Energy =

Department with headquarters in Mumbai, Maharashtra, India

- Paramāṇu Ūrjā Vibhāga
- Logo of DAE; Motto: Atoms in the Service of the Nation

Department overview
- Formed: 3 August 1954; 72 years ago
- Jurisdiction: Government of India
- Headquarters: Mumbai, Maharashtra, India
- Annual budget: ₹24,124 crore (US$2.5 billion) (2026–27)
- Minister responsible: Narendra Modi, Prime Minister
- Deputy Minister responsible: Jitendra Singh, Minister of State in the Department of Atomic Energy
- Department executive: Ajit Kumar Mohanty, Secretary of Atomic Energy and Chairman, Atomic Energy Commission
- Parent Department: Prime Minister's Office
- Child agencies: Atomic Energy Commission; Atomic Energy Regulatory Board
- Website: dae.gov.in

The Department of Atomic Energy (DAE; IAST: Paramāṇu Ūrjā Vibhāga) is an Indian government department with headquarters in Mumbai, Maharashtra. DAE was established in 1954 with Jawaharlal Nehru as its first minister and Homi Bhabha as its secretary.

DAE has been engaged in the developments of nuclear power technology, applications of radiation technologies in the fields of agriculture, medicine, industry and basic research. DAE comprises six research centres, three industrial organisations, five public sector undertakings and three service organisations. It has under its aegis two boards for promoting and funding extramural research in nuclear and allied fields, mathematics and a national institute (deemed university). It also supports eight institutes of international repute engaged in research in basic sciences, astronomy, astrophysics, cancer research and education. It also has in its fold an educational society that provides educational facilities for children of DAE employees.

The important programmes of the DAE are directed towards:

- Enhancing the share of nuclear power in the Power Sector by deployment of indigenous and other proven technologies, and to develop fast breeder reactors, as well as thorium-based reactors with associated fuel cycle facilities;
- Building and operating of research reactors for the production of radioisotopes, building other sources of radiation such as accelerators and lasers, and developing and deploying radiation technology applications in the fields of medicine, agriculture, industry and basic research.
- Developing advanced technologies such as accelerators, lasers, supercomputers, robotics, areas related to fusion research, strategic materials and instrumentation, and encouraging the transfer of technology to industry.
- Carrying out and supporting basic research in nuclear energy and related frontier areas of science; interaction with universities and academic institutions; support to research and development projects having a bearing on DAE's programmes, and international cooperation in related advanced areas of research and contribution to national security.

== Apex board ==
- Atomic Energy Commission (AEC), Mumbai, Maharashtra

== Regulatory board and organisation ==
- Atomic Energy Regulatory Board (AERB), Mumbai, Maharashtra

== Research & development sector ==
- Bhabha Atomic Research Centre (BARC), Mumbai, following Research institutions affiliated to BARC
- Atomic Minerals Directorate for Exploration and Research (AMD), Hyderabad
- Indira Gandhi Centre for Atomic Research (IGCAR), Kalpakkam, Tamil Nadu
- National Centre for Radio Astrophysics, TIFR, Pune
- Raja Ramanna Centre for Advanced Technology (RRCAT), Indore
- Variable Energy Cyclotron Centre (VECC), Kolkata
- Global Centre for Nuclear Energy Partnership (GCNEP), Bahadurgarh, Haryana
- Homi Bhabha Cancer Hospital and Research Centre, Muzaffarpur

== Public sector ==
- Electronics Corporation of India (ECIL), Hyderabad
- Indian Rare Earths Limited (IREL), Mumbai
- Uranium Corporation of India (UCIL), Singhbhum
- Nuclear Power Corporation of India (NPCIL), Mumbai, Maharashtra
- Bharatiya Nabhkiya Vidyut Nigam Limited (BHAVINI), Kalpakkam, Tamil Nadu

== Industrial organisations ==
- Heavy Water Board (HWB), Mumbai
- Nuclear Fuel Complex (NFC), Hyderabad
- Board of Radiation & Isotope Technology (BRIT), Mumbai

== Service organisations ==
- Directorate of Construction, Services and Estate Management (DCSEM), Mumbai
- Directorate of Purchase and Stores (DPS), Mumbai
- General Services Organisation (GSO), Kalpakkam

== Universities and boards ==
- Homi Bhabha National Institute, Mumbai
- Board of Research in Nuclear Sciences, Mumbai

== Aided institutions ==
- Tata Institute of Fundamental Research, Mumbai
- Tata Memorial Centre (TMC), Mumbai
- Centre for Excellence in Basic Sciences (CEBS), Mumbai
- Institute for Plasma Research (IPR), Gandhinagar
- Saha Institute of Nuclear Physics (SINP), Kolkata
- Institute of Physics (IoP), Bhubaneswar
- National Institute of Science Education and Research (NISER), Jatani
- Harish-Chandra Research Institute (HRI), Prayagraj
- National Board for Higher Mathematics (NBHM), Mumbai
- Atomic Energy Education Society (AEES), Mumbai
- Institute of Mathematical Sciences (IMSc), Chennai

=== Atomic Energy Education Society ===
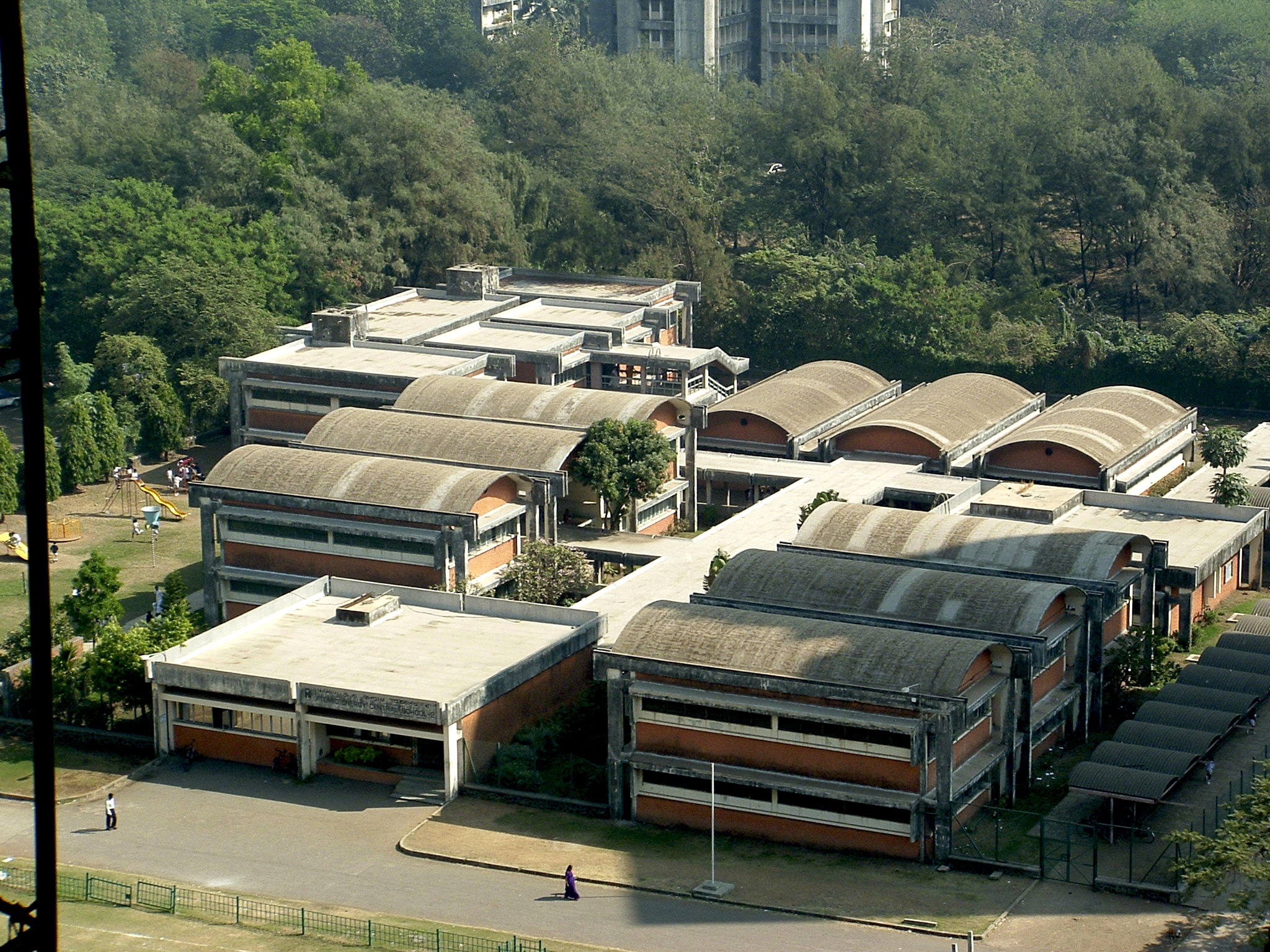
AECS School in Mumbai

Atomic Energy Education Society (AEES) was set up to provide quality education for the children of the employees of the Department of Atomic Energy and its constituent units in Mumbai, Maharashtra. It was established in 1969 with one school in Anushaktinagar, Mumbai. AEES comes under the control of the department.

It administers 31 schools and junior colleges at 14 locations all over the country with more than 26,000 students on its rolls. Managed by 1504 staff members, of which about 1213 are teachers.

The Atomic Energy Central School is a chain of CBSE schools run by the Atomic Energy Education Society, developed for the children of employees of the department.

==== Notable alumni ====
- Suryakumar Yadav
- Shreya Ghoshal
- Parag Agrawal
- Lalchand Rajput

== See also ==
- Atomic Energy Commission of India
- Atomic Energy Regulatory Board
- Nuclear power in India
- India and weapons of mass destruction
