= Indira Gandhi Centre for Atomic Research =

India's premier nuclear research centre

- इंदिरा गांधी परमाणु अनुसंधान केंद्र
- Established: 1971; 55 years ago
- Research type: Nuclear research centre
- Budget: ₹8,450 million (US$90 million) per annum
- Field of research: Atomic Energy, Material Physics, Nano-Sciences, Electronics and Instrumentation, Reactor Engineering, Metallurgy
- Director: C G Karhadkar
- Staff: 2511
- Location: Kalpakkam, Tamil Nadu, 603102, India; 12.5238°N 80.1569°E
- Operating agency: Department of Atomic Energy, Government of India
- Website: www.igcar.gov.in

Indira Gandhi Centre for Atomic Research (IGCAR) is a premier Indian nuclear research centre located in Kalpakkam, India. It is the second largest establishment of the Department of Atomic Energy, after Bhabha Atomic Research Centre (BARC). It was formed as Reactor Research Centre (RCC) on April 30, 1971 by an executive order by Vikram Sarabhai, the then Chairman, Atomic Energy Commission. It was renamed to its current name in December 1985 by former Prime Minister Rajiv Gandhi.

The centre was originally established under the aegis and vision of Sarabhai as a space directed towards the development of fast breeder reactor technology in India, as part of the three-stage nuclear power program. Today, the centre is engaged in a multidisciplinary research programme in various scientific and advanced engineering fields, coordinating with the primary nuclear energy research.

== History ==
=== Origins and creation of Reactor Research Centre (RRC) ===
In the 1950s, Homi Bhabha formulated the Indian three-stage nuclear power programme, with aims to prepare the country for the utilization of its extensive thorium reserves and provide energy security for the 21st century.

Through the 1960s as part of the second stage of the programme, fast-reactor-based research was begun at BARC, Mumbai. But India still lacked a dedicated centre focused on fast reactor science.

After Bhabha died in 1966, Vikram Sarabhai took over as Chairman of the Atomic Energy Commission and argued for an acceleration of India's fast reactor development rather than relying on foreign know-how, which was politically and technologically sensitive.

Acting on his vision, Sarabhai approved setting up a dedicated fast-reactor centre at Kalpakkam, about 80 km south of Chennai. The Reactor Research Centre was formally established in April 1971 through an executive order signed by Sarabhai as Chairman of the AEC. wo develop fast breeder reactor technology that can breed more fissile material than it consumes, facilitating the transition to thorium-based reactors in the third stage.

=== Fast Breeder Test Reactor and expansion of centre ===
From its beginning, IGCAR's central project was the Fast Breeder Test Reactor (FBTR), a sodium‑cooled test reactor conceived both as a technology demonstrator and as an irradiation facility for fuels and structural materials. With a basic concept drawn from the French RAPSODIE design, the FBTR was modified significantly by Indian engineers. On October 1985, the FBTR achieved its first criticality, making India the seventh nation to possess fast breeder reactor technology.

In October of that same year it was renamed as Indira Gandhi Centre for Atomic Research. By this time, the campus had grown into a multi-disciplinary research centre where, in addition to FBTR, there were various labs in radiochemistry, electronics and instrumentation, safety research and auditoriums supporting scientific life at Kalpakkam. This aided research into frontier physics where developments in SQUID devices, high-pressure diamond-anvil setups and high-power physics experiments on the FBTR began to appear.

By the early 1990s, IGCAR’s reprocessing wing had moved from flow‑sheet development to significant radioactive operations. Moreover, the centre broadened into materials science and condensed-matter research.

=== Shift towards PFBR and current developments ===
Experience from FBTR operations fed directly into the design of a commercial‑scale fast reactor: work on what became the 500 MWe Prototype Fast Breeder Reactor (PFBR) was underway, with IGCAR’s Reactor Design Group leading the design studies. In 1996, the Kalpakkam Mini Reactor (KAMINI) reached criticality.

As India’s nuclear programme matured, the government chose to separate research and power‑generation roles: a public‑sector utility, BHAVINI, was created in 2003 to build and operate PFBR and future fast‑breeder power reactors, while IGCAR retained responsibility for design, R&D, and technical support.

Construction of PFBR began in 2004 and a BARC Training School was started in 2006.

In the later 2000s and 2010s, IGCAR added new experimental and pilot‑scale facilities covering the entire fast‑reactor fuel cycle. CORAL (a compact reprocessing facility) and a demonstration fast-reactor fuel reprocessing plant dedicated in 2024 was developed to handle high-burn-up FBTR fuel. In May of that same year, C G Karhadkar took over as the director of IGCAR.

In 2025, the United States lifted its decades-old restrictions on IGCAR along with other DAE-owned centres, facilitating energy co-operation between the two nations.

== Major reactors ==
=== Fast Breeder Test Reactor (FBTR) ===
The Fast Breeder Test Reactor (FBTR) is IGCAR's flagship facility and a cornerstone of India's fast reactor programme. It is a sodium-cooled fast breeder reactor, maintained by the Reactor Operation and Maintenance Group (ROMG). It has a 40 MWt thermal and 13.2 MWe electrical power, achieving its first criticality on October 1985.

=== KAMINI Reactor ===
The Kalpakkam Mini Reactor (KAMINI) is a 30 kWt research reactor that achieved first criticality on October 29, 1996. KAMINI holds the distinction of being the world's first and only reactor designed specifically to use uranium-233 fuel, making it a pioneering facility in thorium-based fuel cycle research.

=== Prototype Fast Breeder Reactor (PFBR) ===
PFBR is a 500 MWe reactor which is being constructed and commissioned by BHAVINI at Kokkilamedu, near Kalpakkam. It is a pool-type, sodium-cooled fast breeder reactor that uses Uranium-Plutonium Mixed Oxide as its fuel. As of 2025, the PFBR is under advanced stages of commissioning, with fuel loading operations underway.

In addition, the Research Facility also built the 100MWe reactor for India's first nuclear submarine the Arihant class submarine project and operated it on land for testing purposes since it attained criticality in December 2004. The submarine launched on 26 July 2009 has this reactor.

== Research groups and laboratories ==
=== Reactor Engineering and Technology ===
The Fast Reactor Technology Group (FRTG) is a major group engaged in:

- Design, fabrication, and operation of sodium test facilities
- Indigenous development of sodium technology
- Sodium level probes, flow and pressure measurement devices
- Under-sodium inspection sensors
- Mechanical and electromagnetic pumps for sodium applications
- In-service inspection equipment and robotic systems

IGCAR has established 13 sodium test facilities indigenously, with the Sodium Technology Complex commissioned in 2025 to serve as a test bed for future fast breeder reactor designs.

The Reactor Design Group (RDG) developed the complete indigenous design of the PFBR. The group is responsible for obtaining design safety clearances from the Atomic Energy Regulatory Board (AERB) and provides analytical support to other groups.

The Reactor Operation & Maintenance Group handles the Fast Breeder Test Reactor and KAMINI reactor. It consists of Reactor Operation Division (ROD), Reactor Maintenance Division (RMD), Technical Services Division (TSD) and Training & Human Resources Development Division (THRDD).

The Group oversees the operation and maintenance of both the reactors: planning and conducting irradiation programmes, reactor physics tests and engineering tests, manpower planning & training, maintenance of chemical parameters of the coolants, periodic safety revaluation.

=== Reprocessing Development ===
Reprocessing Group (RpG) has been instrumental in developing fuel reprocessing capabilities. Key facilities include:

- Reprocessing Development Laboratory (RDL): Established in the early 1970s for developing flow sheets for reprocessing irradiated fuel from FBTR
- CORAL (Compact Reprocessing facility for Advanced fuels in Lead cells): Commissioned in 2003, successfully reprocessed FBTR carbide fuel at various burn-up levels (25, 50, and 100 GWd/t)
- Demonstration Fast Reactor Fuel Reprocessing Plant (DFRP): The DFRP is the world's first industrial-scale plant capable of handling both carbide and oxide spent fuels from fast reactors. The plant has successfully processed its first batch of 20 FBTR spent fuel pins with burn-up of 155 GWd/t
- IGCAR has also mastered the technology of reprocessing highly irradiated mixed carbide fuel for the first time in the world.

=== Electronics, Instrumentation and Computing ===
Electronics and Instrumentation Group consists of Instrumentation & Control Group and Radiological Safety & Environmental Group.

Major activities of this group include:

- Design and development of Distributed Digital Control Systems for fast breeder reactors
- Full-scope operator training simulators
- Safety-critical and safety-related instrumentation systems
- Virtual control panels, 3D modelling for reactor subsystems
- Cyber security management for all systems

The Computer Division establishes and manages high performance scientific computing facilities with supercomputing clusters.

=== Chemistry and Fuel Cycle ===
The chemistry group consists of three divisions: Fuel Chemistry Division (FChD), Metal and Ceramic Fuel Cycle Group (MC & MFCG), and Chemical Facilities Division (CFD).

The major facilities of the Chemistry Group include advanced spectrometry labs from Far-IR Fourier Transform Infrared Spectrometer to Inductively Coupled Mass Spectrometer (ICP-MS) and chromatography labs

The group has made various research achievements, of which radioisotope production for medical use is a major ongoing project.

=== Material Science and Metallurgy ===
Materials Science Group conducts research in areas encompassing condensed matter physics, nanotechnology, nuclear structural materials and more. It consists of

- Material Physics Division
- Surface and Nano-Science Division
- Condensed Matter Physics Division
- SQUID MEG Project

Nuclear & Safety Engineering Group: The objectives of the N&SEG are

- To study the radiological and engineering Safety in Fast Breeder Reactor Systems and related fuel cycle facilities
- Radiological monitoring and health physics programme in different radioactive facilities at IGCAR
- To carry out Industrial Safety Surveillance in all the facilities of the centre
- To study the environmental aspects.

=== Engineering Services ===
Engineering services in IGCAR is mainly served by the Central Workshop Division established in 1975.

== Organizational Structure ==
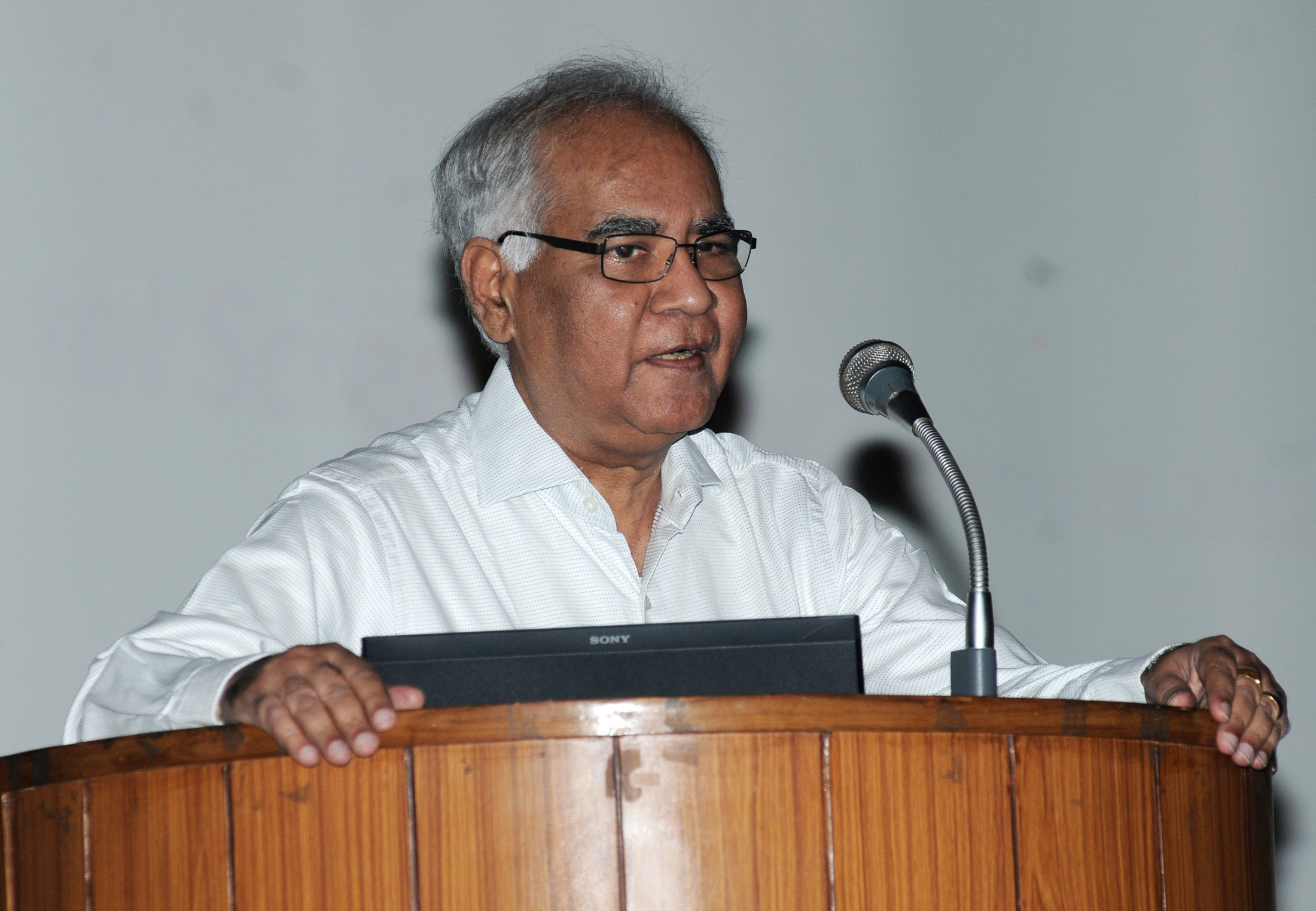
Baldev Raj delivering the National Science Day Lecture, in New Delhi on February 28, 2012

IGCAR is headed by a Director who reports to the Secretary of the Department of Atomic Energy and Chairman of the Atomic Energy Commission. The sanctioned staff strength of IGCAR is 2,814, including 1,187 engineers and scientists. The annual budget of the centre is approximately INR 754.47 crores.

List of Directors of IGCAR
No.	Name	Term of Office
1	Shri Narayanan Srinivasan	1979–1985
2	Prof. Chokkanathapuram Venkataraman Sundaram	1985–1990
3	Shri Shrikant Ramakrishna Paranjpe	1990 – November 1992
4	Dr. Placid Rodriguez	December 1992 – October 2000
5	Shri Shivram Baburao Bhoje	November 2000 – April 2004
6	Dr. Baldev Raj	November 2004 – April 2011
7	Shri Subhash Chander Chetal	May 2011 – January 2013
8	Dr. Polur Ranga Rao Vasudeva Rao	February 2013 – August 2015
9	Dr. Srinivasula Ananta Venkata Satya Murty	September 2015 – June 2016
10	Dr. Arun Kumar Bhaduri	July 2016 – September 2021
11	Dr. B Venkatraman	October 2021 – May 2024
12	Dr. C G Karhadkar	June 2024 – present

== Academic collaborations and training ==
IGCAR maintains extensive collaborations with academic institutions and international organizations.

The first interaction starting with IIT Madras in 1995 through two collaborative projects. An MoU was signed with IIT Madras was established in 1997 for the formation of ‘IGCAR-IITM Cell’ with IIT-M's Director R. Natarajan as chairman. In thirteen years, twenty five meetings of the IGCAR-IITM cell lead to twenty nine projects being completed with a funding of 40.5 million INR and fifteen more projects in progress with a funding of 34 million INR.

Indira Gandhi Centre for Atomic Research, Kalpakkam, has entered into a collaboration with the IIT Kharagpur to carry out research related to the design and development of Fast Breeder Reactors (FBRs). A dedicated IGCAR-IITKGP R&D cell has been set up in the premises of IIT Kharagpur under the Advanced Technology Development Centre's Structural Reliability Research Facility of IIT KGP.

In 2025, an MoU was signed with SRM University-AP for biomedical research, disaster management and academic collaborations.

IGCAR has a BARC Training School called the Orientation Course for Engineering and Science Graduates (OCES) where young graduates are trained in multiple disciplines for a period of one year. Successful trainees are appointed as Scientific Officers in DAE units and may be entitled to a Post-Graduate Diploma from Homi Bhabha National Institute.
