= Kalpakkam =

- Township
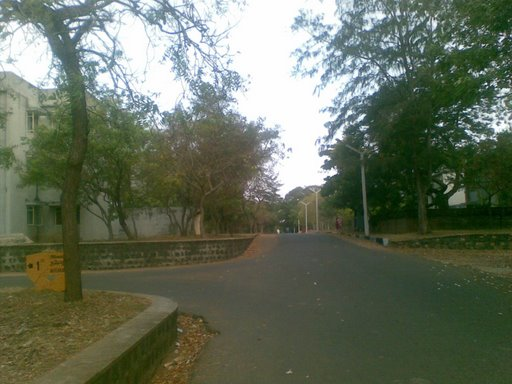
- 1st Street, Kalpakkam Township

- Location in Tamil Nadu, India
- Coordinates: 12.557563°N 80.175406°E
- Country: India
- State: Tamil Nadu
- District: Chengalpattu

Population (2002)
  - Total: ~20,000+

Languages
  - Official: Tamil
- Time zone: UTC+5:30 (IST)
- PIN: 603 102
- Telephone code: 91-44
- Vehicle registration: TN-19
- Lok Sabha constituency: Kancheepuram
- Vidhan Sabha constituency: Cheyyur

Kalpakkam is a township in Tamil Nadu, India, situated on the Coromandel Coast 70 kilometres south of Chennai. A conglomerate of two villages (Puduppattinam and Sadurangappatinam) and a DAE township, it is about 55 kilometres (34 mi) from Thiruvanmiyur and 85 kilometres (53 mi) from Pondicherry. This coastal town is humid. Summers here prevail from early March till late May. Temperatures in the Summer vary from 32 degrees Celsius and can go up to 41 degrees Celsius. There is no particular Monsoon season for Kalpakkam as rains are unpredictable here, although there is heavy rainfall in the months of October and November, usually turning into a storm. The coolest months are December and January. A study by the Madras Atomic Power Station(MAPS) revealed that the pollution in Kalpakkam is very low: only one fiftieth of that in the neighbouring city of Chennai.

Kalpakkam is known for its nuclear plants and affiliated research installations. These include the Madras Atomic Power Station (MAPS), a nuclear power plant, the Indira Gandhi Centre for Atomic Research (IGCAR), an affiliate of the Department of Atomic Energy (DAE) and the Bhabha Atomic Research Centre (BARC). Kalpakkam hosts the only nuclear plant in India with a Fast Breeder Test Reactor (FBTR) and a Pressurised Heavy Water Reactor (PHWR).

Due to increasing congestion in Kalpakkam arising from the need to accommodate more employees, a new township of Anupuram/Amaipakkam, 8 kilometres (5.0 mi) from Kalpakkam, was inaugurated in 1998.

On 26 December 2004, the tsunami caused by the 2004 Indian Ocean earthquake generated widespread damage and resulted in 200 deaths in and around Kalpakkam. There is a tsunami memorial having a white oval plaque engraved with the names of 39 people who lost their lives in the tsunami.

== Facilities ==
Kalpakkam is a well built and planned township. The schools present in the township are Atomic Energy Central School (AECS 1 and 2), Kendriya Vidyalaya-1, Kendriya Vidyalaya-2, Govt Hr. Secondary School and Infant Jesus Matric Hr. Sec. School on Pudupattinam. The township is split into two sides: the Sadras and Pudupattinam sides. Both sides have similar facilities and also good facilities for sports, but Pudupattinam has larger and more complete facilities, such as the hospital and the General Services Organization (GSO). The two sides are separated by two bridges over the canal which joins the sea nearby and well over the backwater. The backwater is a visiting place by many migratory birds especially the rarely seen Siberian crane in the depths of winter. The backwater can be clearly seen through the compound walls of K.V-2 in Sadras.

== Recreation ==
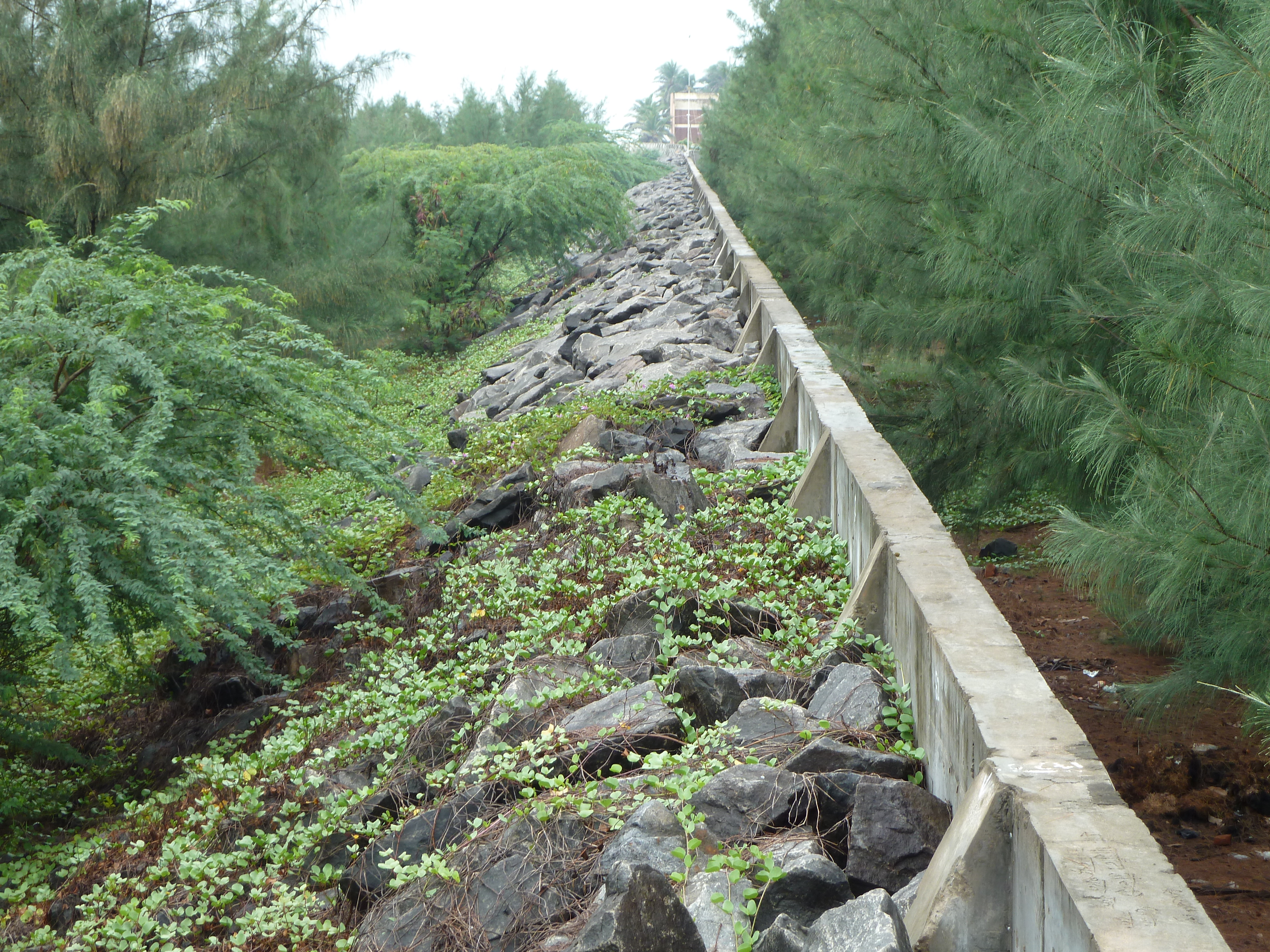
Tsunami wall in Kalpakkam

Until a few years ago, the beach at Kalpakkam used to be lined with casuarina trees and only a few weeds. Nowadays, to avoid the widespread damage in case of a tsunami again, weed growth is starting to dominate, which the locals are fighting to keep in check. A tsunami wall has been built across the seashore in case of another tsunami. The relatively calm waters are free of sharks.

Kalpakkam is also very close to Mamallapuram, a tourist destination near Chennai. The environment within the township has been maintained for over 30 years. The township contains numerous trees and various parks, and recreation facilities, including tennis courts, music, dance, swimming academies and other sport activities.

== NESCO ==
NESCO (Nuclear Employee Sports and Cultural Organisation), previously KRC (Kalpakkam Recreation Centre) is governed by an elected employee council. It offers various facilities for members: Swimming, Movies, Basketball, Volleyball, Football, Badminton, Carrom, Chess, Table Tennis and a Gym. There is also a tennis court and Swimming pool where competitions are held annually.

== Bus routes ==
The township is well connected by road and TNSTC operates buses from Chennai, Pondicherry, Bangalore, Coimbatore, Trichy, Nagercoil, Tirupathi, Vellore, Tiruvannamalai Chittoor, Tindivanam and Kanchipuram. The East Coast Road connecting Chennai and Pondicherry passes through Pudupattinam.

Route number	Start	End	Via
108 Cut	Kalpakkam	Chengalpattu	Tirukalukundram
118	Kalpakkam	Chennai	Mahabalipuram, East Coast Road
119	Kalpakkam	Chennai	Mahabalipuram, Old Mahabalipuram Road
157 Cut	Kalpakkam	Kanchipuram	Chengalpattu
157	Kalpakkam	Vellore	Kanchipuram
164 C	Kalpakkam	Chittoor	Kanchipuram, Arakonam
188 C	Chennai	Cheyyur	Mahabalipuram, Kalpakkam
188 D	Chennai	Anaicut	Mahabalipuram, Kalpakkam
212 H	Kalpakkam	Tirupathi	Kanchipuram, Arakonam, Thiruthani
471 UD	Kalpakkam	Coimbatore	Chengalpattu, Tindivanam, Villupuram, Salem
834 UD	Kalpakkam	Bangalore	Kanchipuram, Vellore, Krishnagiri, Hosur
197 UD	Kalpakkam	Nagercoil	Chengalpattu, Trichy, Madurai, Thirunelveli
