= List of mines in India =

This lists of mines in India is subsidiary to the list of mines article, and future mines in the country and is organised by the primary mineral output. For practical purposes stone, marbles and other quarries may be included in this list. In India, the underground mine to surface mine ratio is 20:80.

== Diamond ==
Mine	State	Coordinates	Associated town	Owner	Period of operation	Note
Bunder Project	Madhya Pradesh	24.35°N 79.34°E				
Kollur Mine	Andhra Pradesh	16.3°N 80.43°E	Guntur			Koh-i-noor, Daria-i-Noor
Panna	Madhya Pradesh	24.27°N 80.17°E		National Mineral Development Corporation		

== Iron ore ==
Mine	State	Coordinates	Associated town	Owner	Period of Operation	Notes
Vyasanakere Mines	Karnataka		Hospet	MSPL		
Pathikonda Iron Ore Mines	Karnataka		Ballari	MSPL		
Alampara Iron Ore Mines	Kerala		Koyilandy	MSPL		
Tikeswar Mahanta Iron Ore Mines	Odisha	22.12°N 85.40°E				
Mayurbhanj	Odisha	22.19°N 86.16°E	Mayurbhanj			
Joda	Odisha					
Keonjhar	Odisha			KCCL Odisha		
Jajpur	Odisha	20.85°N 86.33°E		KCCL Odisha		
Sundergarh	Odisha	22.02°N 84.50°E		KCCL Odisha		
Cuttack	Odisha	20.52°N 82.50°E				
West Singhbhum	Jharkhand		west singhbhum	SAIL		
Bailadila iron ore	Chhattisgarh	21.19°N 81.28°E	Dantewada	National Mineral Development Corporation, Ltd. (NMDC)		
Dalli-Rajhara	Chhattisgarh			Bhilai Steel Plant		
Ratnagiri	Maharashtra	16.98°N 73.3°E	Ratnagiri	bellary going to sale		
Gua	Jharkhand		west singhbhum			
Kudremukh	Karnataka		Chikkamangaluru	KIOCL		

== Manganese ==
Mine	State	Coordinates	Associated town	Owner	Period of Operation	Notes
Sambalpur	Odisha		Joda, Barbil			
Rayagada	Odisha					
Sundergarh	Odisha	22.12°N 84.03°E				
Balaghat	Madhya Pradesh	21.8°N 80.18°E	Balaghat	Manganese Ore India Ltd		Deepest underground manganese mine in Asia
Nagpur and Bhandara	Maharashtra	21.54°N 79.68°E		Manganese Ore India Ltd		

== Copper ==
Mine	State	Coordinates	Associated town	Owner	Period of Operation	Notes
Hazaribagh	Jharkhand	23.98°N 85.35°E	Hazaribagh			
Singhbhum	Jharkhand	22.5°N 85.5°E	Ghatshila			
Khetri	Rajasthan	27.98°N 75.8°E	Khetri	Hindustan Copper		
Udaipur	Rajasthan	24.58°N 73.68°E	Udaipur			
Malanjkhand	Madhya Pradesh	22.02°N 80.71°E	Balaghat	Hindustan Copper		Largest copper mine in Asia.

== Bauxite ==
Mine	State	Coordinates	Associated town	Owner	Period of Operation	Notes
Balangir	Odisha	20.88°N 82.85°E				
Bargarh	Odisha	21.20°N 83.37°E				
Koraput	Odisha	18.85°N 83.02°E	Damanjodi	NALCO		
Kalahandi	Odisha	19.58°N 83.37°E	Lanjigarh	Vedanta		
Sambalpur	Odisha					
Sundergarh	Odisha	21.92°N 85.3°E				
Katni, Amarkantak	Madhya Pradesh	23.48°N 80.12°E				
Bilaspur & Maikal Hills	Chhattisgarh	22.38°N 82.13°E				
Lohardaga	Jharkhand					
Singhbhum	Jharkhand					
Jamnagar	Gujarat					

== Coal ==
Mine	State	Coordinates	Associated town	Owner
Birbhum Coalfield	West Bengal	23.84°N 87.61°E		
Bokaro	Jharkhand	23.8°N 85.75°E		
Deucha Pachami coal block	West Bengal	23.59°N 87.31°E		
Jharia	Jharkhand	23.75°N 86.42°E		BCCL
Jharsuguda	Odisha	22.05°N 83.72°E	Belpahar, Brajrajnagar	
Kalakote	Jammu and Kashmir	33.21°N 74.40°E	Kalakote	Jammu and Kashmir Minerals Ltd.
Ledo	Assam	27.18°N 95.44°E		
Nagpur	Maharashtra	21.90°N 79.50°E		Western Coalfields Limited
Neyveli	Tamil Nadu	11.53°N 79.48°E	Neyveli	Neyveli Lignite Corporation
Rajmahal	Jharkhand	25.23°N 87.20°E		
Raniganj Coalfield	West Bengal	23.37°N 87.06°E		
South Eastern Coalfields	Chhattisgarh	22.35°N 82.68°E		
Talcher	Odisha	20.95°N 85.22°E		
NORTHERN COALFIELDS	MADHYA PRADESH & UTTAR PRADESH	24.10°N 82.45°E		

== Petroleum ==
Mines	name of State	Coordinates	Associated town	Owner	Period of Operation	Notes
Digboi	Assam	27.38°N 95.63°E		Oil India Limited		First mine of India.
Kalol	Gujarat	22.6°N 73.45°E		ONGC		
NaharkatiyaDuliajan	Assam		Duliajan	oil India Limited		
Sibsagar, Geleki	Assam		Sibsagar	ONGC		
Ankleshwar	Gujarat	21.6°N 73.0°E				
Godavari districts	Andhra Pradesh		Kakinada	Reliance Petroleum	2003–present	
Bassein	Maharashtra					
Bombay High	Maharashtra	19.41°N 71.33°E				Largest offshore mine of India.
Ashoknagar Oilfield	West Bengal	22.83589°N 88.59694°E	Ashoknagar, North 24 Parganas	Around 375 barrels of crude oil, whose quality is said to be even better than India's most prolific oil asset Bombay High	Have been extracted from a well on the outskirts Ashoknagar since September 2020	Making it the most potent hydrocarbon discovery ever made in the state

== Gold ==
Mines	State	Coordinates	Associated town	Owner	Period of Operation	Notes
Hatti gold Mines	Karnataka	16.19°N 76.66°E	Hatti, Raichur	Government of Karnataka		
Jonnagiri gold Mines	Andhra Pradesh	15.13°N 77.34°E	Jonnagiri, Erragudi	Deccan Gold Mines		
Kolar Gold Factory [KGF]	Karnataka	12.96°N 78.27°E	Robertsonpet, Kolar	Bharat Gold Mines Limited	1900–2001 (closed)	
Lava Gold Mines	Jharkhand		Chandil	Manmohan Mineral Industries		https://timesofindia.indiatimes.com/city/ranchi/gsi-finds-250kg-gold-reserve-in-e-singhbhum/articleshow/76250409.cms
Sonbhadra Mine	Uttar Pradesh					
Parasi	Jharkhand					https://timesofindia.indiatimes.com/city/ranchi/gsi-finds-250kg-gold-reserve-in-e-singhbhum/articleshow/76250409.cms
Pahadia	Jharkhand					https://timesofindia.indiatimes.com/city/ranchi/gsi-finds-250kg-gold-reserve-in-e-singhbhum/articleshow/76250409.cms
Kunderkocha	Jharkhand					https://timesofindia.indiatimes.com/city/ranchi/gsi-finds-250kg-gold-reserve-in-e-singhbhum/articleshow/76250409.cms
Bhitar Dari	Jharkhand					https://timesofindia.indiatimes.com/city/ranchi/gsi-finds-250kg-gold-reserve-in-e-singhbhum/articleshow/76250409.cms
Dadam	Haryana					

== Lead ore ==
Mine	State	Coordinates	Associated town	Owner	Period of operation	Notes
	Odisha	21.6°N 73.0°E				

== Uranium ==
Mine	State	Coordinates	Associated town	Owner	Period of Operation	Notes
Jaduguda	Jharkhand	22.38°N 86.22°E	Jaduguda, East Singhbhum	Uranium Corporation of India	1967–Present	Discovered in 1951, Jaduguda Mine has the distinction of being the first uranium mine of the country. The mine is accessed through two 5-metre (16 ft) diameter vertical shafts of depth of 640 m (2,100 ft), attaining a total depth of 905 m (2,969 ft).
Narwapahar Mine	Jharkhand		Jadugora, East Singhbhum	Uranium Corporation of India		
Turamdih Uranium mine	Jharkhand		East Singhbhum	Uranium Corporation of India		
Bagjata	Jharkhand		East Singhbhum	Uranium Corporation of India		
Tummalapalle uranium mine	Andhra Pradesh	14.32°N 78.27°E	Kadapa	Uranium Corporation of India	2012–Present	Discovered in 2007, It is believed to be the smallest uranium reserve in the world.
Bhatin	Jharkhand		Jaduguda	Uranium Corporation of India		
