= Mining in India =

The mining industry in India is a major economic activity which contributes significantly to the economy of India. The gross domestic product (GDP) contribution of the mining industry varies from 2.2% to 2.5% only but going by the GDP of the total industrial sector, it contributes around 10% to 11%. Even mining done on small scale contributes 6% to the entire cost of mineral production. Indian mining industry provides job opportunities to around 700 individuals.

As of 2012, India is the largest producer of sheet mica, 2015 the fourth largest producer of iron ore, alumina, chromite, and bauxite in the world. A coal and iron ore project is in the fifth largest reserve in the world. India's metal and mining industry was estimated to be $106.4 billion in 2010.

Mining in India has been prominent since ancient times. The field is noted for significantly contributing to the economy of the nation. However, the mining in India is also infamous for human rights violations and environmental pollution. The industry has been hit by several high-profile mining scandals in recent times.

== Introduction ==
The tradition of mining in the region is ancient and underwent modernization alongside the rest of the world as India has gained independence in 1947. The economic reforms of 1991 and the 1993 National Mining Policy further helped the growth of the mining sector. India's minerals range from both metallic and non-metallic types. The metallic minerals comprise ferrous and non-ferrous minerals, while the nonmetallic minerals comprise mineral fuels, precious stones, among others.

D.R. Khullar holds that mining in India depends on over 3,100 mines, out of which over 550 are fuel mines, over 560 are mines for metals, and over 1970 are mines for extraction of nonmetals. The figure given by S.N. Padhi is: 'about 600 coal mines, 35 oil projects and 6,000 metalliferous mines of different sizes employing over one million persons on a daily average basis.' Both open cast mining and underground mining operations are carried out and drilling/pumping is undertaken for extracting liquid or gaseous fuels. The country produces and works with roughly 100 minerals, which are an important source for earning foreign exchange as well as satisfying domestic needs. India also exports iron ore, titanium, manganese, bauxite, granite, and imports cobalt, mercury, graphite etc.

Unless controlled by other departments of the Government of India, mineral resources of the country are surveyed by the Ministry of Mines, which also regulates the manner in which these resources are used. The ministry oversees the various aspects of industrial mining in the country. Both the Geological Survey of India and the Indian Bureau of Mines are also controlled by the ministry. Natural gas, petroleum and atomic minerals are exempt from the various activities of the Indian Ministry of Mines.

== History ==
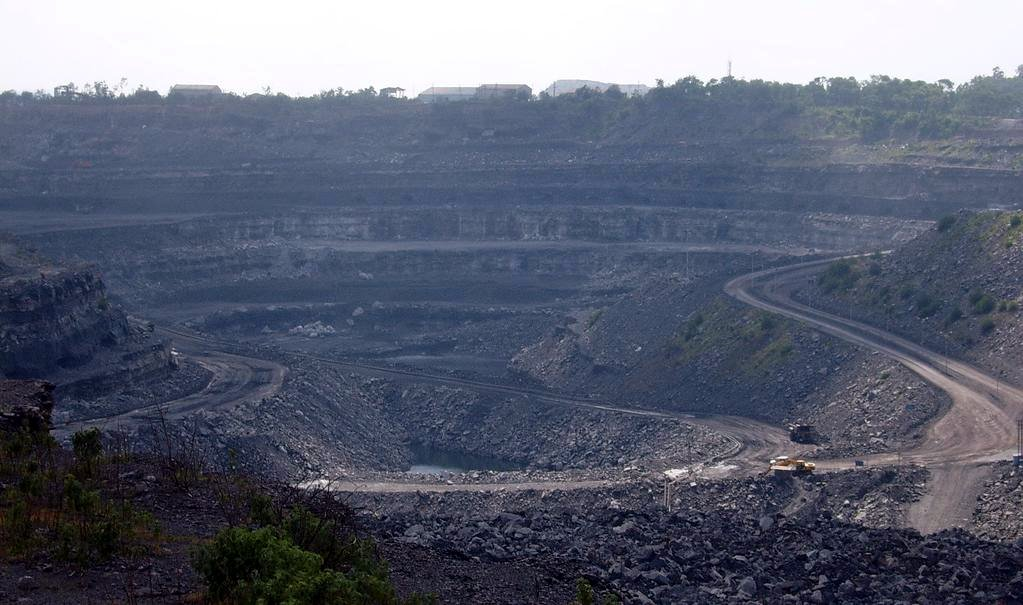
Indian coal production is the 3rd highest in the world according to the 2008 Indian Ministry of Mines estimates. Shown above is a coal mine in Jharkhand.

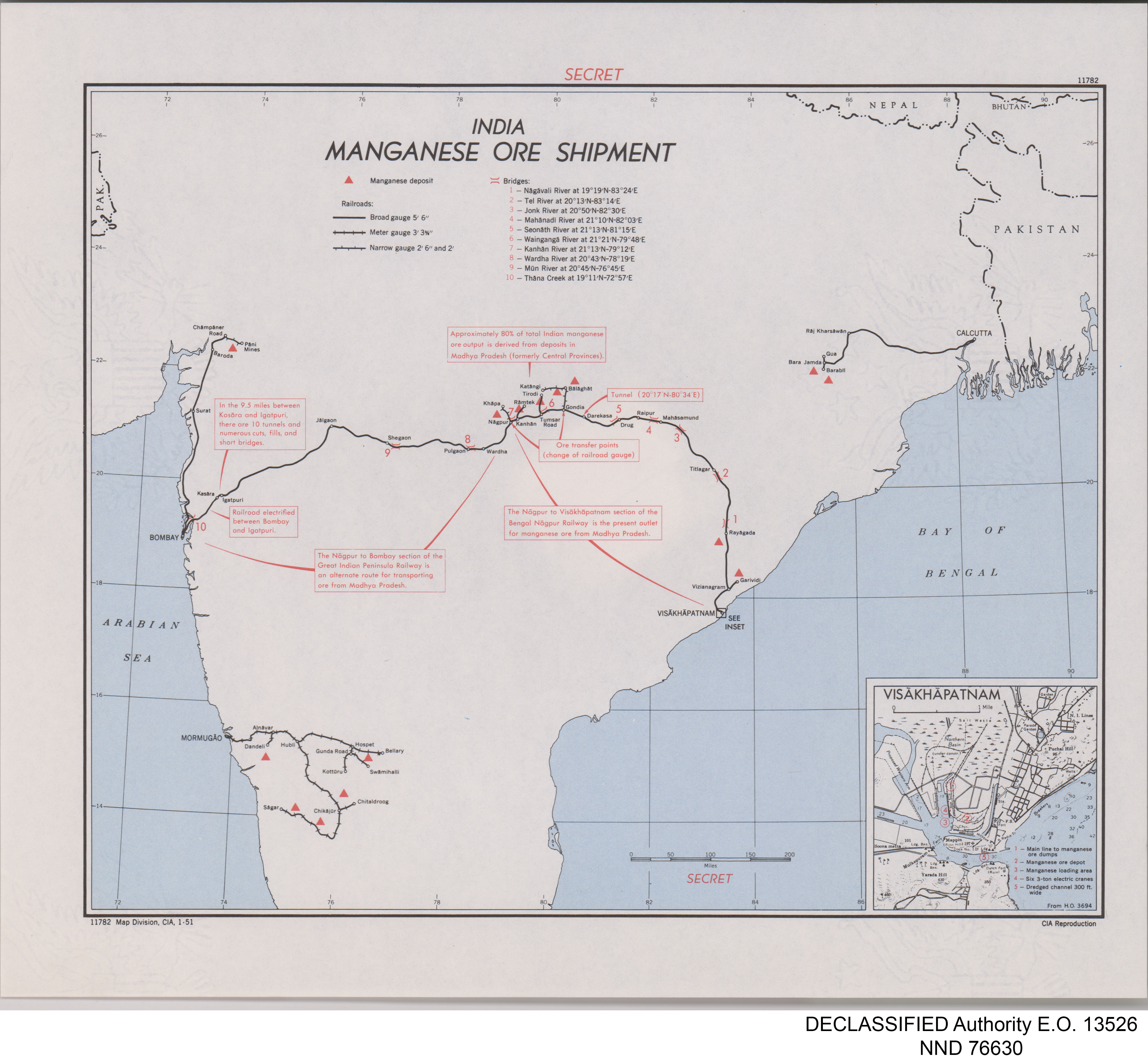
Mining of manganase in 1951

Flint was known and exploited by the inhabitants of the Indus Valley Civilization by the 3rd millennium BCE. P. Biagi and M. Cremaschi of Milan University discovered a number of Harappan quarries in archaeological excavations dating between 1985 and 1986. Biagi (2008) describes the quarries: 'From the surface the quarries consisted of almost circular empty areas, representing the quarry–pits, filled with aeolian sand, blown from the Thar Desert dunes, and heaps of limestone block, deriving from the prehistoric mining activity. All around these structures flint workshops were noticed, represented by scatters of flint flakes and blades among which typical Harappan-elongated blade cores and characteristic bullet cores with very narrow bladelet detachments.' Between 1995 and 1998, Accelerator mass spectrometry radiocarbon dating of Zyzyphus cf. nummularia charcoal found in the quarries has yielded evidence that the activity continued into 1870-1800 BCE.

Minerals subsequently found mention in Indian literature. George Robert Rapp—on the subject of minerals mentioned in India's literature—holds that:

Sanskrit texts mention the use of bitumen, rock salt, yellow orpiment, chalk, alum, bismuth, calamine, realgar, stibnite, saltpeter, cinnabar, arsenic, sulphur, yellow and red ochre, black sand, and red clay in prescriptions. Among the metals used were gold, silver, copper, mercury, iron, iron ores, pyrite, tin, and brass. Mercury appeared to have been the most frequently used, and is called by several names in the texts. No source for mercury or its ores has been located. Leading to the suggestion that it may have been imported.

== Geographical distribution ==
The distribution of minerals in the country is uneven and mineral density varies from region to region. D.R. Khullar identifies five mineral 'belts' in the country: The North Eastern Peninsular Belt, Central Belt, Southern Belt, South Western Belt, and the North Western Belt. The details of the various geographical 'belts' are given in the table below:

Mineral Belt	Location	Minerals found
North Eastern Peninsular Belt	Chota Nagpur Plateau and the Odisha plateau covering the states of Jharkhand, West Bengal and Odisha.	Coal, iron ore, manganese, mica, bauxite, copper, kyanite, chromite, beryl, apatite etc. Khullar calls this region the mineral heartland of India and further cites studies to state that: 'this region possesses India's 100 percent Kyanite, 93 percent iron ore, 84 percent coal, 70 percent chromite, 70 percent mica, 50 percent fire clay, 45 percent asbestos, 45 percent china clay, 20 percent limestone and 10 percent manganese.'
Central Belt	Chhattisgarh, Andhra Pradesh, Madhya Pradesh and Maharashtra.	Manganese, bauxite, uranium, limestone, marble, coal, gems, mica, graphite etc. exist in large quantities and the net extent of the minerals of the region is yet to be assessed. This is the second largest belt of minerals in the country.
Southern Belt	Karnataka plateau and Tamil Nadu.	Ferrous minerals and bauxite. Low diversity.
South Western Belt	Karnataka and Goa.	Iron ore, garnet and clay.
North Western Belt	Rajasthan and Gujarat along the Aravali Range.	Non-ferrous minerals, uranium, mica, beryllium, aquamarine, petroleum, gypsum and emerald.

India has yet to fully explore the mineral wealth within its marine territory, mountain ranges, and a few states and regions e.g. Gadchiroli in Maharashtra, Assam.

Over the last three years, Gadchiroli has also emerged as a mining hub, on its way to becoming another steel hub of India. Companies such as Lloyd's Metal and Energy Limited, with mines operated by Thriveni Earthmovers, have been successful in navigating internal conflict to start mining operations in the region since 2021. They have also received a government push, which aims to establish the region as the steel hub of India by 2030.

The Maharashtra government has been working on improving infrastructure in the region to make this a reality. The LMEL's current Surjagad Iron Ore Mines, currently operating are set to reach a production capacity of 25 MTPA, with the foundations of the Integrated Steel Plant already underway. Another player, Surjagad Ispat, has already entered the region, and more are sure to follow.

If this becomes a reality, India steel capacity will increase, reducing both cost and an overall dependency on steel imports from China.

== Newly discovered mines/deposits ==
Project	Metal/Resource	Discovered by	Location	Notes
Lithium Mines in Salal-Haimana area of Reasi district	Lithium	Geological Survey of India	Jammu and Kashmir	Jammu and Kashmir lithium reserves found in Salal-Haimana area of Reasi district
Lithium Mines in Degana's Renvat hill and its surrounding areas	Lithium	Geological Survey of India	Rajasthan	
Lithium Mines in East Singhbhum and Hazaribagh	Lithium	National Mineral Exploration Trust (NMET)	Jharkhand	
Lithium Mines in Madhya	Lithium	Atomic Minerals Directorate for Exploration and Research (AMD)	Karnataka	lithium reserves have been found near Mandya by researchers of the Atomic Minerals Directorate. The reserves have been estimated at 14,100 tonnes in a small patch of land surveyed in Mandya that was published in the Current Science journal.
Lithium Mines in Yadgiri	Lithium	Atomic Minerals Directorate for Exploration and Research (AMD)	Karnataka	preliminary survey indicates lithium deposits in Yadgiri district
Tantalum Mines in Sutlej River	Tantalum	IIT Ropar	Ropar, Punjab	
Uranium Mines in Sikar, Rohil west, Jahaz and Geratiyon ki Dhani districts	Uranium	Atomic Minerals Directorate for Exploration and Research (AMD)	Rajasthan	the Atomic Minerals Directorate for Exploration and Research (AMD) found 8,813 tonnes of uranium oxide deposits in Rohil in Sikar district, 1,086 tonnes in Rohil west, 3,570 tonnes in Jahaz and 1,002 tonnes in Geratiyon ki Dhani.
Rare earth Mines in Ananthapur district	Light Rare Earth	National Geophysical Research Institute	Ananthapur, Andhra Pradesh	The light rare earth element minerals found in Ananthapur district include allanite, cerite, thorite, columbite, tantalite, apatite, zircon, monazite, pyrochlore euxenite and fluorite.
Rare earth deposits in Alang beach	Vanadium	Geological Survey of India	Alang, Gujarat	GSI researchers suggested that the vanadiferous titanomagnetite deposits in the Gulf of Khambhat may have been transported from the Deccan basalts region, primarily through the Narmada and Tapi rivers. They gathered a total of 69 sediment samples from this Gulf.
Rare earth Mines in Barmar district	Rare Earth	Department of Atomic Energy	Barmar, Rajasthan	Good reserves of rare earth elements (REE) like bastnasite, britolite, synchisite and xenotime have been found in carbonates and microgranite rocks in south west parts of Rajasthan. Microgranite rocks have been found in Jalore's Siwana, which has the rarest Genotime rare earth deposits, while 5 million tonnes of rare earth elements deposits are also possible in Barmer's Kamthai, Dhani granite block near Pali and carbonates in Nivaniya village near Udaipur.
Gold Mines in Sonbhadra district	Gold	UP geology	Sonbhadra, Uttar Pradesh	
Gold Mines in Keonjhar, Mayurbhanj and Deogarh district	Gold	Directorate of Mines and Geological Survey of India	Odisha	Gold mines have been found at different locations of three districts of Odisha. These gold deposits have been found at four places in Keonjhar District, four places in Mayurbhanj District and at one place in Deogarh district.
Gold Mines in Jamui district	Gold	Geological Survey of India	Jamui, Bihar	
Gold Mines in Jonnagiri district	Gold		Jonnagiri, Andhra Pradesh	Deccan Gold Mines Ltd (DGML), the first and only gold exploration company listed on BSE, has a significant stake of 40 per cent in Geomysore Services India Limited which is developing the first private sector gold mine at Jonnagiri. Production is likely to begin in either October or November 2024.

== Minerals ==
Along with 48.83% arable land, India has significant sources of coal (fourth-largest reserves in the world), bauxite, titanium ore, chromite, natural gas, diamonds, petroleum, and limestone. According to the 2008 Ministry of Mines estimates: 'India has stepped up its production to reach the second rank among the chromite producers of the world. Besides, India ranks 3rd in production of coal & lignite, 2nd in barites, 4th in iron ore, 5th in bauxite and crude steel, 7th in manganese ore and 8th in aluminium.'

India accounts for 12% of the world's known and economically available thorium. It is the world's largest producer and exporter of mica, accounting for almost 60 percent of the net mica production in the world, which it exports to the United Kingdom, Japan, United States of America etc. As one of the largest producers and exporters of iron ore in the world, its majority exports go to Japan, Korea, Europe and the Middle East. Japan accounts for nearly 3/4 of India's total iron ore exports. It also has one of the largest deposits of manganese in the world, and is a leading producer as well as exporter of manganese ore, which it exports to Japan, Europe (Sweden, Belgium, Norway, among other countries), and to a lesser extent, the United States of America.

=== Production ===
The net production of selected minerals in 2015 as per the Production of Selected Minerals Ministry of Mines, Government of India is given in the table below:

Mineral	Quantity	Unit	Mineral type
Coal and lignite	683	Million tonnes	Fuel
Natural Gas	32,249	Million cubic metres	Fuel
Crude oil	36.9	Million tonnes	Fuel
Bauxite	28.134	million tonnes	Metallic mineral
Copper	3.9	Million tonnes	Metallic mineral
Gold	1,594	kilogram	Metallic mineral
Iron ore	156	Million tonnes	Metallic mineral
Lead	145	Thousand tonnes	Metallic mineral
Manganese Ore	2,148	Thousand tonnes	Metallic mineral
Zinc	759	Thousand tonnes	Metallic mineral
Diamond	31,836,091	Carats	Non-metallic mineral
Gypsum	3,651	Thousand tonnes	Non-metallic mineral
Limestone	170	Million tonnes	Non-metallic mineral
Phosphorite	1,383	Thousand tonnes	Non-metallic mineral

=== Exports ===
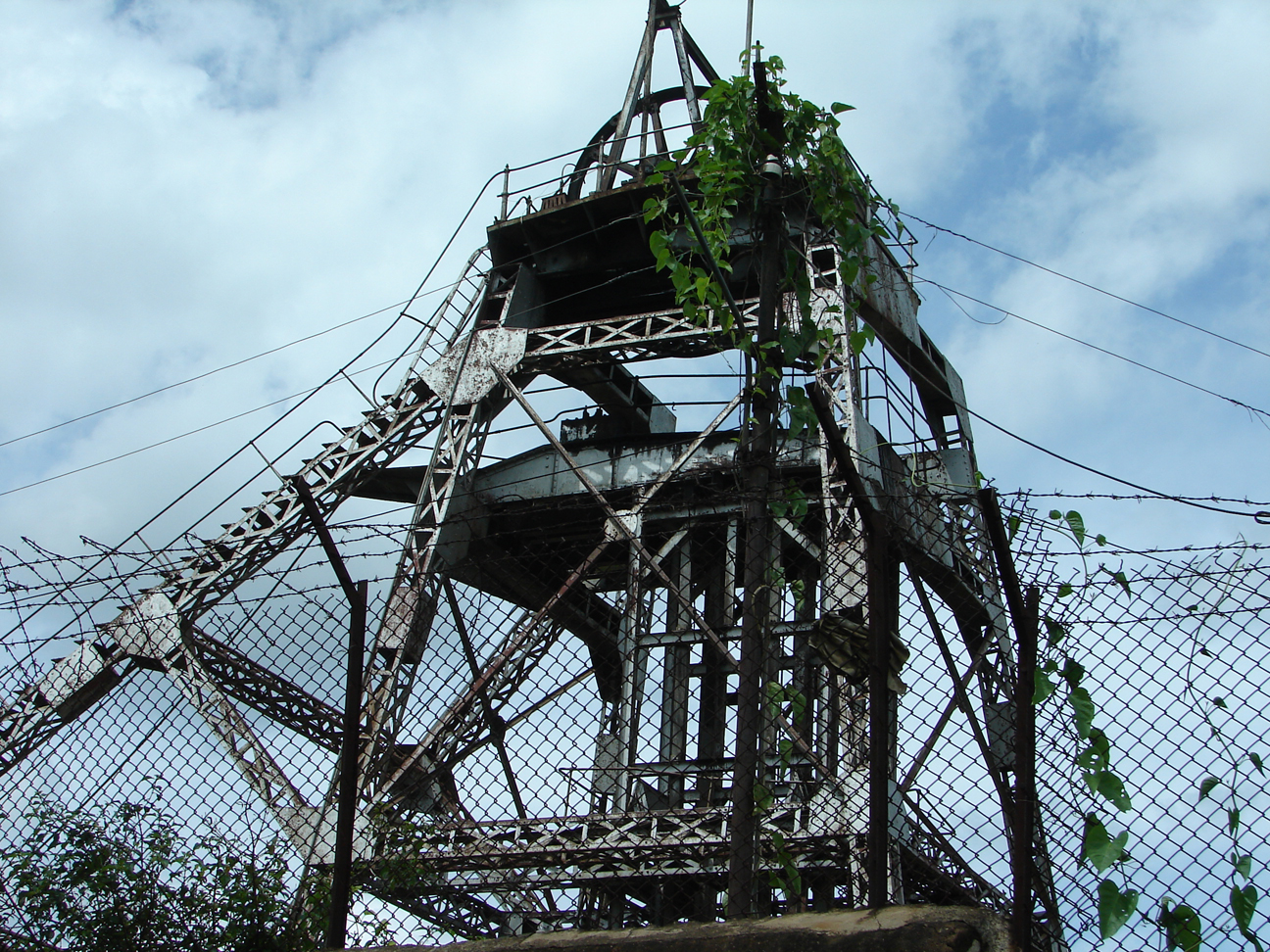
Mine shaft at Kolar Gold Fields.

The net exports selected of minerals in 2004-05 as per the Exports of Ores and Minerals Ministry of Mines, Government of India is given in the table below:

Mineral	Quantity exported in 2004-05	Unit
Alumina	896,518	tonnes
Bauxite	1,131,472	tonnes
Coal	1,374	tonnes
Copper	18,990	tonnes
Gypsum & plaster	103,003	tonnes
Iron ore	83,165	tonnes
Lead	81,157	tonnes
Limestone	343,814	tonnes
Manganese ore	317,787	tonnes
Marble	234,455	tonnes
Mica	97,842	tonnes
Natural gas	29,523	tonnes
Sulfur	2,465	tonnes
Zinc	180,704	tonnes

== Legal and constitutional framework ==
India is not a signatory to the Extractive Industries Transparency Initiative [EITI]. But, on national scale, there are legal and constitutional framework to manage the mineral sector:

- The policy level guidelines for mineral sector is given by the National Mineral Policy of 2008.
- Mining operations are regulated under the Mines and Minerals (Development and Regulation) [MMDR] Act of 1957.
- The State Governments, as owners of minerals, grant mineral concessions and collect royalty, dead rent and fees as per the provisions of MMDR Act 1957. These revenues are held in the Consolidated Fund of State Government until the state legislature approves their use through budgetary processes.
- In a recent development, the Supreme Court has said that "Ownership of minerals should be vested with the owner of the land and not with the government."

The subject of ‘mineral regulation and development’ occurs at S.No. 23 of the State list in the VIIth schedule to the Constitution. However, the Constitution circumscribes this power, by giving Parliament the power under S.No. 54 of the Central list in the VIIth schedule, to enact legislation, and to this extent, the States will be bound by the Central legislation. The Mines and Mineral (Development and Regulation) Act 1957 is the main Central legislation in force for the sector. The Act was enacted when the Industrial Policy Resolution 1957 was the guiding policy for the sector, and thus was aimed primarily at providing a mineral concession regime in the context of the metal making public sector undertakings. After the liberalization in 1991, a separate National Mineral Policy was promulgated in 1993 which set out the role of the private sector in exploration and mining and the MMDR Act was amended several times to provide for a reasonable concession regime to attract the private sector investment including FDI, into exploration and mining in accordance with NMP 1993.

The Mines and Minerals (Regulation and Development) Act, 1957 (MMDR Act 1957 in short) was enacted so as to provide for the regulation of mines and development of minerals under the control of the Union. The Act has been amended in 1972, 1986, 1994 and 1999 in keeping with changes in the policy on mineral development. The Mines and Minerals (Regulation and Development) Amendment Act, 1999, inter-alia, provides for (a) introduction of a new concept of reconnaissance operations distinct from prospecting; (b) delegation of powers to the State Governments to grant mineral concessions for limestone; (c) granting of mineral concession in non-compact and non-contiguous areas; (d) liberalizing the maximum area limits for prospecting licences and mining leases; (e) empowering the State Governments to make rules to curb the illegal mining etc.

The Act was amended in the year 2015 with the intention of removing discretion and introducing more transparency in the grant of mineral concessions. The amendments now made to the MMDR Act, 1957 provide that mineral concessions will be granted only on the basis of bidding at an auction, for the prospecting stage or mining stage as the case may be.

New Mineral (Auction) Rules notified in 2015 for the auction procedures. The Minerals (Evidence of Mineral Contents) Rules, also notified at the same time specifies the technical requirements.

== Issues with mining ==
One of the most challenging issues in India's mining sector is the lack of assessment of India's natural resources. A number of areas remain unexplored and the mineral resources in these areas are yet to be assessed. The distribution of minerals in the areas known is uneven and varies drastically from one region to another. India is also looking to follow the example set by England, Japan and Italy to recycle and use scrap iron for the ferrous industry.

The first National Mineral Policy was enunciated by the Government in 1993 for liberalization of the mining sector. The National Mineral Policy, 1993 aimed at encouraging the flow of private investment and introduction of state-of-the-art technology in exploration and mining. In the Mid-Term Appraisal of the Tenth Five-Year Plan, it was observed that the main factors responsible for lack of success of the Policy were procedural delays in the processing of applications for mineral concessions and the absence of adequate infrastructure in the mining areas. To go into the whole gamut of issues relating to the development of the mineral sector and suggest measures for improving the investment climate the Mid-Term Appraisal had proposed the establishment of a High Level Committee. Accordingly, the Government of India, Planning Commission, constituted a Committee on 14 September 2005. under the Chairmanship of Shri Anwarul Hoda, Member, Planning Commission. The committee made detailed recommendations on all of its terms of Reference in December 2006. Based on the recommendations of the High Level Committee, in consultation with State Governments, the Government replaced the National Mineral Policy, 1993 with a new National Mineral Policy on 13 March 2008.

Under the British Raj a committee of experts formed in 1894 formulated regulations for mining safety and ensured regulated mining in India. The committee also passed the 1st Mines act of 1901 which led to a substantial drop in mining-related accidents. The accidents in mining are caused both by man-made and natural phenomenon, for example, explosions and flooding. The main causes for incidents resulting in serious injury or death are roof fall, methane gas explosion, coal dust explosion, carbon monoxide poisoning, vehicular accidents, falling/slipping and hauling related incidents.

In recent decades, the mining industry has been facing issues of large scale displacements, resistance of locals - as reported by the Indian journalist Aditi Roy Ghatak in the magazine D+C Development and Cooperation -, human rights issues like indentured labour as reported by the List of Goods Produced by Child Labor or Forced Labor and environmental issues like pollution, corruption, deforestation and dangers to animal habitats.

=== Sand mining ===
Sand mining is an environmental problem in India. Environmentalists have raised public awareness of illegal sand mining in the states of Maharashtra, Madhya Pradesh, Andhra Pradesh, Tamil Nadu and Goa. Conservation and environmental NGO Awaaz Foundation filed a public interest litigation in the Bombay High Court seeking a ban on mining activities along the Konkan coast. Awaaz Foundation, in partnership with the Bombay Natural History Society also presented the issue of sand mining as a major international threat to coastal biodiversity at the Conference of Parties 11, Convention on Biological Diversity, Hyderabad in October 2012. D. K. Ravi, an Indian Administrative Service officer of the Karnataka state, who was well known for his tough crackdown on the rampant illegal sand mining in the Kolar district, was found dead at his residence in Bengaluru, on 16 March 2015. It is widely alleged that the death was not due to suicide but caused by the mafia involved in land grabbing and sand mining.

== Corporate Social Responsibility Study ==
=== Background ===
Mining plays an important role in Indian industry, which contributes about 3% of the GDP in the 1990s, and about 2% of the GDP now. Goa, a state of India, has 1000 million tonnes of iron ore reserves and thereby has a strong mining industry. It exports about 30 million tonnes of iron ore annually. In the early 21 century, the demand of iron ore from China increased in a dramatic speed, accordingly, the export of iron ore from Goa increased. Meanwhile, Indian government loosened the regulation on iron ore trading. These aspects, along with other factors like spot contract, resulted in the doubled export of iron ore between 2005 and 2010.

In order to maintain the sustainability of mining, the Indian government set up a series of regulations included in Act of Parliament in 1987. According to Act of Parliament, mining companies had to obtain the lease for 20 years in maximum from the Indian Government, otherwise, their mining behaviors were not allowed.

=== CSR and Mineral Foundation of Goa ===
When it comes to the corporate social responsibility (CSR), Indian government encouraged companies to take discrete corporate social actions. According to Companies Act 2013 of India, every company was required to invest 2% of their net profit in social program annually. Discrete corporate social actions means corporate social actions are not a part of the core strategy in companies, so companies are more likely to take social actions by setting up their own foundation.

Mineral Foundation of Goa (MFG) is a non-profit organization that founded by 16 mine operators on 12 December 2000. The main purpose of MFG is to implement their social responsibility by helping communities and residents near the mining area in various ways. Their most common take was to invest in social and environmental projects, such as environmental sustainability, healthcare and educational support. For instance, MFG totally invested Rs. 10 crores in environmental sustainability project between 2000 and 2010. In some ways, they contributed a lot to the society through these projects, such as creating ponds, donating books and equipment to the schools. However, MFG was unwilling to give further support to maintain their results. On the other hand, farmers preferred to receive money from mining companies, whereas mining companies wanted to provide technical assistance.

=== The Ban ===
In 2010, Shah Commission visited Goa, and soon they found several important facts that existed in Goa's mining industry. Some mining companies continued mining even if their leases were expired, some were mining outside the permissive mining area., some failed to maintain a required distance between overburden and irrigation canals. All aspects above resulted in the fact that the production of iron ore exceeded the allowable output by more than 15%. Based on these negative impacts caused by mining industry, the state government shut down all 90 iron ore mines in Goa. Later, the Supreme Court also gave a temporary ban on mining operations in Goa.

=== Result and Conclusion ===
The ban on the mining industry directly resulted in a huge loss of government revenue, which is up to Rs. 50,000 crores (8 billion dollars). Furthermore, the mining ban also hit India's GDP in 2013 and 2014. It also caused social problems as people who lost their jobs were unwilling to take their former occupations, like fishing and farming.

This study shows that when the core strategy conflicts with corporate social responsibility, the social benefits created by companies will not guarantee companies' normal operations. In Goa's case, even though some mining companies and organizations, like MFG, took corporate social actions, most of the mining companies are more profit-oriented. Due partially to the lack of government documents and supervision, mine operators became more opportunistic, in other words, companies tended to take the risk of doing illegal things and gain more profit. Moreover, social actions may not be sufficient. Despite the fact that the water quality had somewhat improved, the concentration of iron ore in water was still unacceptable in some periods.

== See also ==
- Copper production in India
- Diamond mining in India

== Bibliography ==
- Annual Report (2007-2008), Ministry of Mines, Government of India, National Informatics Centre.
- Biagi, Paolo (2008), "Quarries in Harappa", Encyclopaedia of the History of Science, Technology, and Medicine in Non-Western Cultures (2nd edition) edited by Helaine Selin, pp. 1856–1863, Springer, ISBN 978-1-4020-4559-2.
- Padhi, S.N. (2003), "Mines Safety in India-Control of Accidents and Disasters in 21st Century", Mining in the 21st Century: Quo Vadis? edited by A.K. Ghose etc., Taylor & Francis, ISBN 90-5809-274-7.
- Rapp, George Robert (2002), Archaeomineralogy, Springer, ISBN 3-540-42579-9.
- Khullar, D.R. (2006), "Mineral Resources", India: A Comprehensive Geography, pp. 630–659, ASMITH Publishers, ISBN 81-272-2636-X.
- Yule, P.A.–Hauptmann, A.–Hughes (1989 [1992]) M. The Copper Hoards of the Indian Subcontinent: Preliminaries for an Interpretation, Jahrbuch des Römisch-Germanischen Zentralmuseums Mainz 36, 193–275, ISSN 0076-2741 http://archiv.ub.uni-heidelberg.de/savifadok/volltexte/2009/509/
- Lyday, T. Q. (1996), The Mineral Industry of India, United States Geological Survey.
- "Find Indian Mining related information at a single place"
- "Indian Mining Industry - News and Analysis".
- Resources on Mining, India environment portal
