= Tailing Pond (film) =

2019 documentary film

- Directed by: Saurav Vishnu
- Written by: Monica Vishnu
- Produced by: Saurav Vishnu; Ashok Kumar Tiwary
- Narrated by: Cynthia Nixon
- Edited by: John Custodio
- Music by: Michael Whalen
- Production company: Golden Fist Films
- Distributed by: ShortsTV
- Release date: 2021
- Running time: 52 minutes
- Country: United States
- Language: English

Tailing Pond is a documentary film that highlights how tribal families in Jadugora, Jharkhand are experiencing harmful effects of uranium radiation exposure. The documentary is produced & directed by Saurav Vishnu and narrated by Cynthia Nixon. Tailing Pond is officially in consideration for the 93rd Academy Awards in the Documentary – Short category.

== Synopsis ==
Jadugora is a town located in Jharkhand, which is considered a uranium hub of India. The word “Jadugora” in Hindi means enchanted land. Tailing ponds are water bodies used to store unusable extracts from mining operations. Jadugora has nine such highly toxic or radioactive tailings from a nearby uranium mining facility.

The plot revolves around how the Indian government might be continuously overlooking the villager’s wellbeing. Decades of multi-generational effects of exposure to radiation are visible in the form of stillbirths, skeletal deformity, fatal illness, and other harmful effects.

== History ==
The uranium deposits at Jadugora were discovered in the year 1951. The year 1967 saw the formation of the Uranium Corporation of India (UCIL) for the mining and milling of uranium ore in India. Jadugora became the first uranium mine of India, with a plant located close to the mine being used to process the uranium ore. Several tribal families used to live nearby for centuries and continue to live there to this day. The short film seeks to draw attention to nuclear waste dumping, and the resultant suffering of the tribals over many generations.

== Reception ==
Speaking about the project, the film narrator Cynthia Nixon said:

When Saurav approached me for ‘Tailing Pond’ I was overwhelmed by the story. After learning about the suffering of innocent tribal people, I decided to lend my voice to the project. Jadugora is a small village in Jharkhand, India, and the local communities have been victimized by diseases caused by radioactive waste for generations. I feel proud to be part of the project as it strives to bring global awareness of the horrors being experienced by the people of Jadugora. I hope audiences are as moved by the story as I have been and that our film helps bring about positive change.

The film has so far been screened at about 50 film festivals worldwide. It has collected over fifteen awards including the New York Indian Film Festival (Best Film), the Jaipur International Film Festival (Best Film), and the Calcutta International Cult Film Festival (Best Documentary Film). Tailing Pond’s worldwide TV premiere was on the ShortsTV network on Saturday, November 20, 2021.

Tailing Pond has been confirmed for a six-episode docu-series in 2022-2023. The upcoming docu-series will highlight the other tailing ponds in and around the villages.
