= Saurav Vishnu =

Indian film-maker

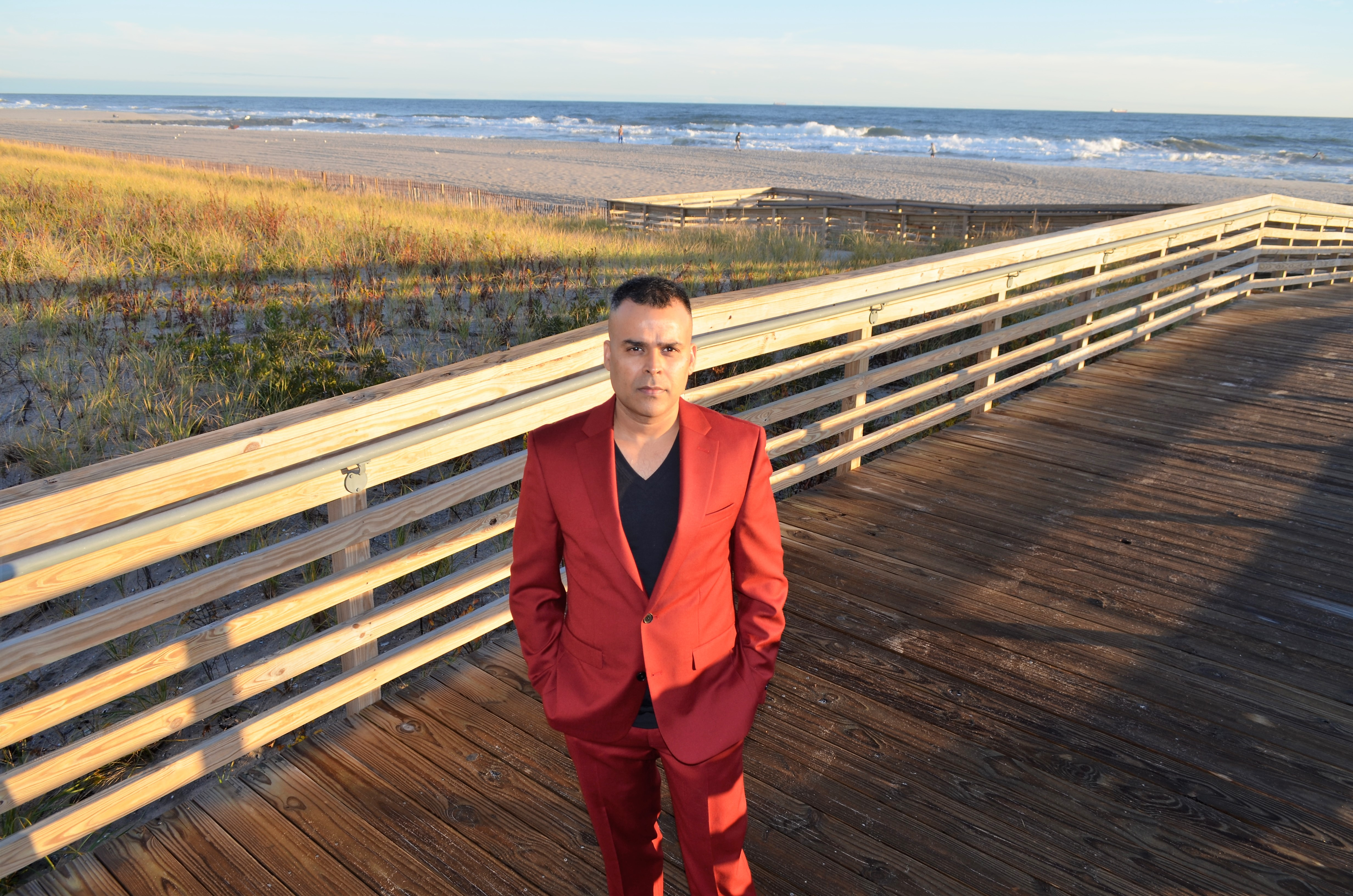
- Born: Jharkhand, India
- Education: St. Johns University, New York; NIT Jamshedpur
- Occupations: Director; Producer; Documentary film maker
- Years active: 2015−present
- Known for: Tailing Pond (2021 Film)

Saurav Vishnu is an Indian director and producer, known for his works on films like Tailing Pond and Guilty Not Guilty. Tailing pond qualified for consideration for the 93rd Academy Awards in the Documentary – Short category.

== Early life ==
Saurav Vishnu was born in Jharkhand, India, and moved from Jamshedpur, India to New York City in 2003. A graduate of engineering, Saurav Vishnu pursued an MBA in finance and risk management at St. John's University. A graduate of engineering from NIT Jamshedpur.

== Career ==
=== Political career ===
Saurav Vishnu is also a politician. He was a candidate for a member of parliament in May 2025 from East Singhbhum. Jamshedpur constituency. Later, he also contested as a member of the legislative assembly in November 2025 from Jamshedpur East. Saurav Vishnu was named Jharkhand's first billionaire candidate, with an approximate worth of over 100 crore rupees, in comparison to all the nomination paper filed by each candidates, in Jharkhand legislative assembly elections. He was Independent candidate in both elections. His campaign was focused on education, health, and employment issues.

=== Filmmaking ===
Jadugora was Saurav's first filmmaking project, as his father, Ashok Kumar Tiwary, was posted as the officer-in-charge of Jadugora police station twice. The film took 5 years to complete. A non for profit 501(c)(3) organization was formed in 2017 to raise funds for the Jadugora communities.

The documentary exposes the plight of the tribal families in the small town of Jadugora because of the tailing ponds containing mildly radioactive, unguarded waste. As per the reports "47% of women in Jadugora have reported miscarriages, disruptions in menstrual cycles, and other fertility issues. Further, 51% of the children are afflicted with limb deformities and skeletal distortions, right at birth".

This is contrary to claims made by UCIL regarding their investments in healthcare, ecology, and environmental protection, in their annual report for the session 2019-20 that also recorded income of Rs 2,420 crores/$310 million. The documentary shows the abysmal healthcare facilities, and how the only medical centre remains closed for most part of the year.

Per Vishnu, subsequent documentary films would delve deeper into the issue of tailing ponds. (UCIL has acquired new pieces of land to construct new tailing ponds).

In February 2024, Saurav released trailers for his two upcoming documentary feature films. The first film, ‘Nine months in Chatikocha,’ is the second movie in the Tailing Pond six-part documentary series. Nine months in Chatikocha,’ is about trials and tribulations of villagers in Chatikocha, Jaduguda whose land and houses were taken over by UCIL. The film depicts the pain of the people living in the area. The second upcoming documentary film, tentatively entitled ‘Tata,’ is about civic rights of citizens in Jamshedpur, Jharkhand.

== Filmography ==
Year	Title	Writer	Director	Producer
2018	Guilty Not Guilty			Yes
2021	Tailing Pond		Yes	Yes
TBA	Nine months in Chatikocha	Yes	Yes	Yes
TBA	Tata	Yes	Yes	Yes
TBA	One	Yes	Yes	Yes

== Social Work ==
Saurav is also a social activist. He has filed a case against the industrial Conglomerate Tata Group, aka Tata Steel, against converting Jamshedpur into an industrial town, which will deny citizens of Jamshedpur third voting rights to choose a mayor for their municipality. This issue has long been debated at both the state and national levels and opens up discussion around self-government and good governance. Critics debate over corporate control of a large population in Jamshedpur as deterioration of the three-layered democratic system. Saurav also worked on the compensation of victims of MGM Medical College. He worked for open spaces for citizens, tree plantation, and for retired employees of Tata Steel.
