= Homi Sethna =

Indian nuclear scientist and chemical engineer

Homi Nusserwanji Sethna

Chairman of Atomic Energy Commission of India
- In office 1972-1983
- Preceded by: Vikram Sarabhai
- Succeeded by: Raja Ramanna

Sheriff of Bombay
- In office 1991-1992
- Preceded by: Saad Alim Bagban
- Succeeded by: Bakul Rajani Patel

Personal details
- Born: 24 August 1923 Bombay, Bombay Presidency, now Maharashtra
- Died: 5 September 2010 (aged 87) Mumbai, Maharashtra
- Education: University Department of Chemical Technology; University of Michigan Ann Arbor
- Known for: Indian nuclear programme Smiling Buddha; Operation Shakti
- Awards: Padma Shri (1959); Padma Bhushan (1966); Padma Vibhushan (1975)
- Scientific career
- Fields: Chemical Engineering
- Workplaces: Atomic Energy Commission of India

Homi Nusserwanji Sethna (24 August 1923 – 5 September 2010) was an Indian nuclear scientist and a chemical engineer, gaining international fame as the Chairman of the Atomic Energy Commission (India) during the time when the first nuclear test, codename Smiling Buddha in Pokhran Test Range in 1974 was conducted. He was the primary and central figure in India's civilian nuclear program as well as the construction of nuclear power plants. In 1991, he was appointed as Sheriff of Mumbai.

He was awarded the second highest civilian award the Padma Vibhushan in 1975, by Government of India.

Earlier in his career, he had full technical responsibility for setting up of the Thorium extraction plant at Alwaye, Kerala India, for separation of rare earth from monazite sands.

== Early life and education ==
Homi Sethna was born to a Parsi family on 24 August 1923 in Bombay (now Mumbai). He did his schooling from St. Xavier's High School, Fort, Bombay. He studied chemical engineering at University Department of Chemical Technology and the University of Michigan Ann Arbor, Michigan.

Homi Sethna's younger brother was the noted lawyer Rusi Sethna. Incidentally, Rusi Sethna's daughter, Behrouz Mistry, is the wife of Shapoorji Mistry, elder son of Pallonji Mistry and elder brother of Cyrus Mistry.

== Career ==
He was formerly Chairman of Atomic Energy Commission, in 1976 he became the first chairman of Maharashtra Academy of Sciences, located in Pune, Maharashtra.

=== Head of Trombay Nuclear Facility ===
He completed the construction of the Thorium plant and the plant for the production of nuclear grade uranium metal at Trombay, India. His first major challenging assignment was the setting up of the Plutonium Plant at Trombay in 1959. This was designed and constructed entirely by Indian scientists and engineers under H. N. Sethna as the Project Engineer. The Uranium Mill at Jaduguda, Jharkhand was also constructed under his guidance in 1967. He was also the Project Manager of a 40 MW reactor called Canada-India Reactor in 1956–58.

=== Indian atomic test of 1974 ===
He was the guiding force behind the first peaceful nuclear explosion, Project Smiling Buddha in India on 18 May 1974, and in 1975, Homi Sethna, then chairman of the Atomic Energy Commission, Raja Ramanna and Basanti Dulal Nagchaudhuri (head of the DRDO) received the Padma Vibhushan.

== Awards ==
- 1959: Padma Shri
- 1960: Shanti Swarup Bhatnagar Prize for Science and Technology
- 1966: Padma Bhushan
- 1967: University of Michigan Sesquicentennial Award
- 1975: Padma Vibhushan
