= List of industrial cities in India =

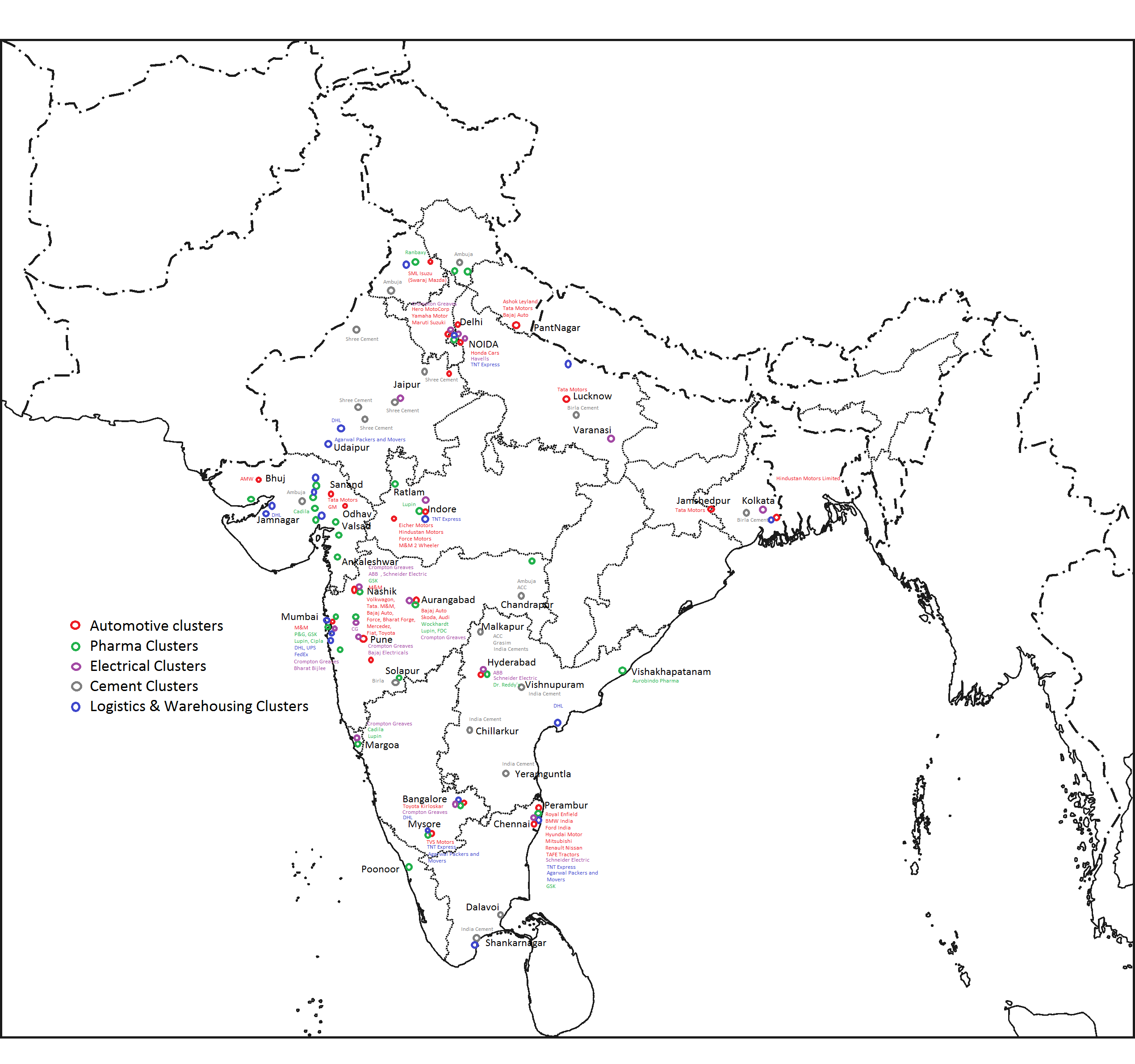
Industrial clusters in India for automobile, pharmaceutical, electrical, cement and logistics & warehousing

The major industrial centres in India are listed below:

== Andhra Pradesh (Official: Telugu) ==
No.	Place	Significance
1	Guntur	Cotton, textiles, tobacco, chillies
2	Kadapa	Uranium, steel
3	Kakinada	Textiles, paper, oil and gas
4	Sri city	Automotive, chemicals, cosmetics, packaging and labelling, consumer products, plastics, electrical components
5	Vijayawada	Auto components
6	Visakhapatnam	Steel, ship building, pharmaceutical, fertiliser, coffee, fishing, petrochemical, refining, naval weapons
7	Nellore	Agriculture, fishing

== Assam (Official: Assamese/Asamiya) ==
No.	Place	Significance
1	Dibrugarh	Tea industries, petrochemicals, polymers & oil refineries
2	Guwahati	Oil refineries, cement, steel strips, pipes
3	Bongaigaon	Oil refineries
4	Digboi	Petroleum
5	Noonmati	Oil refineries
6	Numaligarh	Oil refineries

== Bihar (Official: Hindi/Hindustani) ==
No.	Place	Significance
1	Patna	Food processing, textiles, leather, pharmaceutical, cracker, vermillion, handicraft
2	Gaya	Sugar, lac, cotton textile, leather, handicraft
3	Barauni	Oil refineries
4	Bhagalpur	Tusar silk, handicraft
5	Munger	Gun, cigarette, rail engine repair (Jamalpur)
6	Katihar	Jute

== Chhattisgarh ==
No.	Place	Significance
1	Bhilai	Iron and steel, power generation, cement, chemical, light and heavy industries, railway marshalling yard, fabrication and machining, electronics and electrical works
2	Raipur	Steel, Iron ore, plywood, containers logistics, paper power generation and cement, agriculture, Ceramic, stone mines, textile retail market, electronic manufacturing cluster
3	Bilaspur	Thermal Energy, Cement, Steel, Food Processing, Railway Engineering, Chemical
4	Korba	Aluminium factory, thermal power plant, Coal and Minerals Mining
5	Raigarh	Coal, iron and steel, power generation, cement, light and heavy industries, rice mills, limestone, dolomite
6	Bhatapara	Dal mill, rice mill, poha mill, cements, fireworks, limestone
7	Jagdalpur	Coal, iron and steel, Mining

== Delhi (UT) ==
No.	Place	Significance
1	Delhi	Various

== Goa ==
No.	Place	Significance
1	Margao	Electrical, ice cream, pharmaceuticals, liquor
2	Panaji	Iron ore
3	Cuncolim	Cobalt, nickel and copper

== Gujarat ==
City	Major industrial sector
Ahmedabad	Textiles, pharmaceuticals, chemicals, machinery, engineering
Surat	Textiles, diamond cutting and polishing, chemicals, steel
Vadodara	Chemicals, pharmaceuticals, engineering, petrochemicals
Rajkot	Auto components, diesel engine, machine tools, jewelry, kitchenware
Bhavnagar	Chemicals, salt, shipbuilding
Jamnagar	Oil refinery, petrochemicals, chemicals, brass
Anand	Dairy, food processing, agriculture
Gandhinagar	IT, electronics, biotechnology
Bharuch	Chemicals, Petrochemicals, pharmaceuticals, textiles
Morbi	Ceramics, tiles, sanitary ware
Vapi	Chemicals, pharmaceuticals, paper, textiles
Valsad	Chemicals, pharmaceuticals, agriculture
Junagadh	Agriculture, minerals, textiles
Nadiad	Textiles, agriculture, food processing
Mehsana	Dairy, agriculture, chemicals
Porbandar	Fishing, chemicals
Godhra	Dairy, agriculture, chemicals
Navsari	Agriculture, chemicals
Surendranagar	Salt, textiles
Patan	Agriculture, textiles
Amreli	Agriculture, textiles
Palanpur	Agriculture, textiles
Modasa	Pharmaceuticals, textiles
Dahod	Agriculture, textiles, engineering
Gandhidham	Port, chemicals, logistics
Bhuj	Salt, textiles, handicrafts
Ankleshwar	Chemicals, pharmaceuticals, textiles
Kalol	Pharmaceuticals, textiles, agriculture
Sanand	Automobiles, engineering, pharmaceuticals
Halol	Automobiles, engineering
Kadi	Textiles, engineering
Khambhat	Agate industry, chemicals
Jetpur	Textiles, engineering
Kutch	Salt, handicrafts
Mundra	Port, logistics, manufacturing
Morbi	Ceramics, tiles, sanitary ware
Rajpipla	Agro-based industries, chemicals
Dwarka	Fisheries, salt
Dholka	Engineering, pharmaceuticals
Gandharpur	Textiles, agriculture
Bhachau	Salt, textiles
Chotila	Textiles, agriculture
Dhandhuka	Agriculture, textiles
Umargam	Chemicals, pharmaceuticals, textiles
Padra	Chemicals, pharmaceuticals, engineering
Jhagadia	Chemicals, pharmaceuticals
Kalol	Pharmaceuticals, textiles
Savli	Engineering, pharmaceuticals, IT
Sachin	Textiles, chemicals
Palghar	Chemicals, pharmaceuticals
Godhra	Dairy, agriculture, chemicals
Vallabh Vidyanagar	Education, engineering
Mandvi	Shipbuilding, textiles
Halvad	Textiles, agriculture
Balasinor	Agriculture, cement
Nandesari	Chemicals, pharmaceuticals
Pardi	Textiles, agriculture
Karamsad	Dairy, agriculture, pharmaceuticals

== Haryana ==
No.	Place	Significance
1	Panipat	Textiles, fertilizers
2	Sonipat	Railway coaches, medicine, food manufacturing, auto components
3	Faridabad	Auto components
4	Gurugram	Automobiles, pharmaceuticals, fertilizer, railways, power utility, IT, auto components
5	Pinjore	Machine tools
6	Hisar	Steel
7	Karnal	Rice, agricultural implements, pharmaceuticals, FMCG
8	Jhajjar	Garima

== Himachal Pradesh ==
No.	Place	Significance
1	Baddi	FMCG, Pharmaceutical
2	Nalagarh	Pharmaceutical
3	Solan	Pharmaceutical

== Jammu and Kashmir (UT) ==
No.	Place	Significance
1	Baramulla	Watches

== Jharkhand (Official: Hindi/Hindustani) ==
No.	Place	Significance
1	Bokaro Steel City	Steel, coal, gas, chemicals, cement
2	Bagjata	Uranium mines
3	Ranchi	Heavy equipment, heavy industry, steel R&D, chemicals, agro-based industries
4	Jamshedpur	Iron and steel, automotive, auto components
5	Dhanbad	Coal, fertiliser, cement
6	Giridih	Steel, coal, mica
7	Jharia	Coal, petrochemicals
8	Jaduguda	Uranium mines
9	Mohuldih	Uranium mines
10	Narwapahar	Uranium mines
11	Rakha	Copper mines
12	Turamdih	Uranium mines
13	Kendadih	Copper mines
14	Ghatsila	Copper refinery
15	Singhbhum	Mining and mineral extraction
16	Jhumri Telaiya	Bauxite, quartz, feldspar, tourmaline
17	Noamundi	Iron Mines

== Karnataka ==
No.	Place	Significance
1	Bangalore	Biotechnology, electronics, IT, aircraft, logistics
2	Belagavi (Belgaum)	Hydraulics, heavy tools, automotive exports, aerospace, foundry exports, tires, aluminum works, hand loom and power loom works, heavy forging
3	Bhadravati	Iron and steel
4	Channapatna	Wooden toys
5	Kollegal	Silk
6	Kolar	Gold
7	Mysore	Silk
8	Ballari	Iron and steel
9	Raichur	Gold, thermal power
10	Mangalore	Oil refining, petrochemicals, fertilizers, shipping, seafood, fish processing
11	Tumkur	Aerospace, cotton cloths, woolen blankets, ropes, watches
12	Hubli	Textiles, manufacturing
13	Hospet	Iron ore & steel
14	Dandeli	Paper manufacturing
15	Kalburgi	Cement manufacturing
16	Udupi	Seafood
17	Kodagu	Spices, coffee, coconut, betel nuts
18	Chickmagalur	Spices, coffee, coconut, betel nuts
19	Davangere	Textiles, manufacturing
20	Dharwad	Electronics, textiles, manufacturing, heavy engineering, rice mills
21	Nelamangala	Food, heavy engineering, automobile, manufacturing engineering, flour mill, polymer manufacturing

== Kerala ==
No.	Place	Significance
1	Hosdurg	Chemicals, textiles, heavy engineering, locomotives, chemicals, cement, fertilizer, automobile, food processing, auto components, coffee, cattle feed
2	Palakkad	Railway coaches, heavy engineering, ironworks, copper smelting, aluminum, textiles, defense, fireworks, paper, cement, fertiliser, rice mills, coffee, tea, sugar, leather, plastics, pharmaceuticals, fruit processing (mango, grapes, orange, litchi, guava), match works, timber, clay, tile, glass, machinery, automobiles, footwear
3	Kannur	Hand loom exports, aircraft, electronics, food processing, timber, bricks, cement, rubber, coffee, sugar
4	Kochi	Oil refining, petrochemicals, ship building, IT, iron and steel, electronics, chemicals, spices, seafood, biotechnology, rubber, plastics, automobiles, power, petrochemical
5	Thiruvananthapuram	Aerospace, biotechnology, IT, medical R&D, chemicals, seafood, coir, textile, electronics, food processing, petroleum, polymers, rubber, leather, gold, pharmaceuticals, timber, fertilizer, automobile, tyre
6	Thrissur	Gold, biotechnology, IT, timber, textiles, granite, rubber, cement, coir, spices, chemicals, clay, automobiles, pharmaceuticals, paper, printing, fireworks, iron and steel
7	Kunnamkulam	Paper, coconut, textiles, match works, gold, chemicals, fireworks
8	Calicut	Textiles, manufacturing, IT, tiles, rubber, granite, bricks, steel, tire, footwear
9	Perambra	Coconut products (subhiksha), rubber, cocoa, coffee, rice, sugar, fireworks, textiles
10	Muvattupuzha	Spices, glass, clay, sand, tile, medical equipment, fruit processing (Pineapple, mango and orange), liquor, fireworks, auto components, tires, rubber
11	Kollam	Cashew, coir, clay, chemicals, seafood, meat, food processing, tobacco, railway, rubber, textiles, match works, tile, glass, radioactive heavy minerals, umbrellas, Industrial machinery manufacturing and supplies, cashew nut processing factory
12	Thiruvalla	Sugar, clay, leather, drugs, medical equipment, food processing, rubber, chemicals, liquor, mirrors, umbrellas
13	Kottayam	Rubber, chemicals, fish processing, pharmaceuticals, spices, cocoa, coffee, meat processing, leather, rice, sugar, paper, medical equipment, liquor, printing, Match works, cement, tires, umbrellas
14	Idukki	Tea, jaggery, spices, coffee, cocoa, fruit processing
15	Alleppey	Coir, seafood, textiles, rice, sugar, chemicals, tiles, pharmaceuticals, cement, gold, jewellery, coconut, umbrellas, Coastal tourism, Water tourism
16	Cherthala	Coir, seafood, food processing, cattle feed, heavy electrical, chemicals, railway wagons, steel, rice, paper, gold, match works, glass, tiles, IT, plastics, radioactive heavy minerals, granite, liquor, cement, fireworks
17	Aluva	Rare earth metals, automobiles, tyres, aluminium, fertiliser, IT, food processing, metals, fireworks, chemicals, hardware, electronics, medical equipment, rice, plastic goods, tile, machinery, detergents, iron and steel, cement, watches, heavy engineering, timber, aircraft repair, auto components, petrochemicals, liquor, clay
18	Kollam	Cashew, Seafood

== Madhya Pradesh ==
number	Place	Significance	Source
1	Panna	Diamond, Cement, Mining	
2	Indore	Textiles, IT, automobiles, metal, chemicals, pharma	
3	Bhopal	Chemicals, Electronic, Medicine, Food, Plastic, Railway engineering	
4	Singrauli	Coal Mining, Thermal Energy, Heavy Industrie's	
5	Pithampur	Automobiles, medicine, cotton yarn	
6	Gwalior	Textiles, Agro processing, Pharma, Rail spring, Edible oil mills, Fertilizer, Cement, Sugar mill, SAIL steel plant etc.	
7	Nepanagar	Newsprint Paper	
8	Ujjain	Textile, soybean oil, nylon, Food Processing, Chemical	
9	Dewas	Pharmaceutical, food processing, chemical, Security paper mill	
10	Nagda	Chemical, fiber, Solar Energy	
11	Neemuch	Cement, graphite, Chemical and Fertilizer	
12	Khandwa	Cotton, textiles, edible Oil	
13	Khargone	Cotton, textile, Food	
14	Itarsi	Defense, Papermill, Food Processing, Railway	
15	Katni	Defense, Cement, Railway, MiniralMining	
16	Jabalpur	Defense, Food Processing, Sawmiling, Minerals, Manufacturing	
17	Satna	Cement, Hand loom, textiles, Cable	

== Maharashtra ==
No.	Place	Significance
1	Navi Mumbai	Silver, platinum, palladium, rhodium, chemicals, electronics, electrical, automation, heavy industry, logistics, IT, textiles, MSME
2	Pimpri-Chinchwad	Automobiles, medicine, electronics, pharmaceuticals, heavy industry, machinery, tools
3	Mumbai	Petroleum, automobiles, electronics, entertainment, logistics, textiles
4	Nashik	Automobiles, grapes, pharmaceuticals
5	Pune	Automobiles, manufacturing, pharmaceuticals, IT
6	Cht. SambhajiNagar (Aurangabad)	Automobiles, manufacturing, pharmaceuticals, chemical, electrical
7	Nagpur	Manufacturing, IT
8	Chandrapur	Iron and steel, coal, power, paper, chemicals, mining, cement
9	Ichalkaranji	textiles
10	Ambarnath	Machine tools
11	Worli	Baby food
12	Kolhapur	Sugar, foundry and metal casting, leather, precision machining industry, testing equipment manufacturing industry, textiles, automobile parts manufacturing, food & dairy products, sugar manufacturing equipments, foundry components manufacturing, water pumps, boilers and valves manufacturing, hydraulics, heavy tools, hand loom and power loom works, heavy forging
13	Sangli	Food & dairy products, sugar, additional grapes wine park, turmeric, cold storages, Machine-Shops(Workshops), foundry-components manufacturing, cutting tools, manufacturing of farming equipments, water-pumps, boilers and valves manufacturing
14	Jalgaon	Jewellery, chemicals, plastics, petroleum, textiles PVC pipes and fittings, irrigation systems
15	Ballarpur	Paper, coal, thermal power
16	Gadchandur	Mining, cement
17	Warora	Mining, coal, power
18	Kirloskarwadi	Heavy equipment, heavy engineering
19	Boisar	Chemical, plastic
20	Chiplun	Agro, mineral, chemical
21	AURIC	Heavy equipment, heavy engineering, textile, food, defence, engineering, chemical, electronics
22	Jalna	Steel, agro

== Odisha (Official: Odia/Odishi/Oriya) ==
No.	Place	Significance
1	Rourkela	Iron and steel, heavy engineering, coal, paper, petrochemical, refining, naval weapons
2	Angul	Coal, aluminium, electricity, Iron and steel, stainless steel
3	Kalinganagar, Jajpur	Iron and steel, stainless steel
4	Paradeep	Petroleum & petrochemicals, gas, agrochemicals, fertilizers, Logistics
5	Khorda, Bhubaneswar	Food & FMCG, textile & apparel
6	Jharsuguda	Aluminium, steel
7	Damanjodi, Koraput	Aluminum
8	Rayagada	Aluminium, paper
9	Joda	Iron & Manganese Mines

== Punjab ==
No.	Place	Significance
1	Ludhiana	Bicycles, metal fabrication, machine parts, auto components, household appliances, hosiery, apparel, garments, sugar
2	Amritsar	Printing
3	Nangal	Fertlisers
4	Jalandhar	Cast iron casting
5	Hoshiarpur	Tractors, pressure cookers
6	Mohali	IT, auto components, tractors

== Rajasthan ==
No.	Place	Major industrial sector
1	Pali	Textile, dyeing, ceramic
2	Bhiwadi	Automobiles, auto components, food, pharma, engineering goods
3	Jodhpur	Handicraft, furniture, agro based, engineering
4	Jaipur	Pharma, automation, electronics, IT, textiles, handicraft
5	Rawatbhata	Nuclear power plant
6	Kota	Thermal, textiles, ceramics, fertilizers, chemical, education
7	Bhilwara	Textile, apparel, mining and mineral based
8	Udaipur	mining, Chemical, cement, textiles, tourism and hospitality, ceramic
9	Chittorgarh	cement, mining, chemical, ceramic
10	Barmer	oil and gas, textile, renewable energy
11	Ajmer	Marble and granite, textiles, cement
12	Sriganganagar	agro based industries
13	Bikaner	wool, leather goods, handicraft, energy
14	Dholpur	glass industry
15	Jaisalmer	tourism, mineral based industry, stone carving, handloom, solar and wind energy
16	Tonk	leather and footwear

Neemrana- Japanese industrial zone automobile, fmcg and electrical appliances

== Tamil Nadu ==
1	Coimbatore	Manufacturing (engineering procurement and tooling, automotive engineering and components, wet grinders, home appliances, motor pumps, jewelry and gems), IT, textile, aerospace and defence, railways, paper, poultry, retail, E-commerce and hospitality
2	Trichy	Central railway workshop, OFT (Ordinance Factory Trichy), HAPP (Heavy Alloy Penetrator Project), HEPF (High Energy Projection Factory), BHEL, railway diesel locoshed, fabrication, boilers, defense, aerospace components
3	Salem	Iron and steel
4	Chennai	Various
5	Hosur	Automobiles, electronics, granite, plastics, chemicals
6	Ambattur	Cycles
7	Avadi	Tanks
8	Dindigul	Locks
9	Ennore	Thermal power
10	Kalpakkam	Atomic power
11	Kagithapuram	Paper
12	Nandambakkam	Surgical instruments
13	Neyveli	Lignite
14	Ooty	Film
15	Perambur	Automotive
16	Sivakasi	Fireworks, safety matches, printing, packaging
17	Tiruppur	Textiles and garments
18	Kudankulam	Nuclear power plant
19	Sriperumpudur	Automobile manufacturing
20	Erode	Textiles, powerlooms, leather processing, coir industries, edible oil refineries, dyeing units

== Telangana ==
No.	Place	Significance
1	Hyderabad	Pharmaceutical, Biotechnology, electronics, IT, aerospace, defence, heavy metal fabrication, precision manufacturing, logistics
2	Warangal	Textile, IT
3	Karimnagar	Coal
4	Adilabad	Coal & paper
5	Nizamabad	Food processing, limestone & granite
6	Nalgonda	Food processing, limestone & granite

== Uttar Pradesh ==
No.	Place	Significance
1	Firozabad	Glass and bangle works
2	Varanasi	Hand-loom, electric fans
3	Moradabad	Brass utensils
4	Bareilly	Handicrafts, furniture, matches
5	Noida	Software, electronic components, mobile phones, automobiles, food processing units,
6	Kanpur	Defence, leather, chemical, pharmaceuticals, prosthetics, fertiliser, iron and steel, detergents, tobacco, food processing units, plastics, aerospace, textiles, footwear, electronics, power, automobiles
7	Gajraula	Chemical, food processing units, drugs, fertiliser
8	Unnao	Chemical, food processing units, leather, quilts
9	Mirzapur	Carpets
10	Muzaffarnagar	Sugar, iron and steel
11	Meerut	Sugar, sports equipment, medical equipment
12	Saharanpur	Sugar, paper, wood carving
13	Bulandshahr	Sugar, milk, ceramics/pottery, agriculture
14	Aligarh	Locks
15	Lucknow	Sugar, aerospace, automobiles
16	Raebareli	Railway coaches, cement, thermal power, telephones
17	Renukoot	Aluminium
18	Mathura	Petroleum, textiles, Dairy and Sweets

== Uttarakhand ==
No.	Place	Significance
1	Rudrapur	Automobiles, pharmaceuticals, chemicals, tires, plywood, electronics
2	Haridwar	Sugar, cement, automobiles, pharmaceuticals, electronics, plastics, packaging

== West Bengal (Official: Bengali/Bangla/Bangali) ==
No.	Place	Significance
1	Kolkata	IT & BPO, ship builders
2	Durgapur	Iron and steel, coal, graphite, power, cement, chemicals, heavy engineering, IT
3	Kharagpur	Chemicals, machinery, heavy metals, automobiles, railways, cement
4	Haldia	Petrochemical, refinery, industrial chemicals
5	Darjeeling	Tea
6	Chittaranjan	Electric locomotives (CLW)
7	Rupnarayanpur	Cables
8	Howrah	Jute, light engineering
9	Dankuni	Warehouse, locomotives, heavy engineering, milk and beverages, biscuits, plywood
10	Rishra	Textile, jute, cotton, heavy engineering
11	Champdani	Jute, cotton, heavy engineering
12	Bhadreswar	Jute
13	Tribeni	Tissue paper
14	Kalimpong	Tea, wood
15	Siliguri	Tea, timber, IT
16	Dalkhola	Maize
17	Raiganj	Rice
18	Malda	Mango
19	Rampurhat	Mining, stone crushing, rice
20	Suri	Rice, silk, furniture
21	Shantiniketan	Handicrafts, rice
22	Baharampur	Silk, sarees, ivory, sholapith, metal, Brass
23	Jangipur	tobacco -bidi, khaini mulberry
24	Kalyani	Heavy engineering, pharmaceutical, bio-technology, meat processing, rice
25	Katwa	Rice, jute, mustard
26	Bardhaman	Rice, brick, food processing, potato
27	Asansol	Coal, Iron and steel, Locomotives, heavy engineering, cement, cables
28	Budge Budge	Petroleum, jute, power
29	Kanchrapara	Electrical locomotives and workshop, railway coaches, furniture
30	Halisahar	Jute, pulp, paper
31	Naihati	Jute, paint
32	Bhatpara	Jute, paper, battery, heavy engineering
33	Barrackpore	Jute, rifles, aeronautical, heavy engineering, dry cells, cables
34	Titagarh	Jute, wagons, paper, steel, heavy engineering
35	Khardah	Jute, heavy engineering
36	Panihati	Jute, chemical, heavy engineering, tractor, tobacco
37	Kamarhati	Jute, paper, heavy engineering, matches, ceramics
38	Dum Dum	Heavy engineering, guns, bullets, railway wagon, construction equipment
39	Midnapore	Cultural place, education sector, tobacco
