= Jaduguda uranium mine =

Uranium mine in India

- Location in India
- Location: Jaduguda, Purbi Singhbhum district, Jharkhand, India; 22°39′12″N 86°20′48″E
- Products: Uranium
- Opened: 1967
- Company: Uranium Corporation of India
- Website: www.ucil.gov.in

The Jaduguda Mine (also spelt as Jadugoda or Jadugora) is a uranium mine in Jaduguda village in the Purbi Singhbhum district of the Indian state of Jharkhand. It commenced operation in 1967 and was the first uranium mine in India. The deposits at this mine were discovered in 1951. As of March 2012, India possesses eight functional uranium mines, including this Jaduguda Mine. A new mine, Tummalapalle uranium mine is discovered and mining is going to start from it.

Mining activities were suspended in 2014 following an inquiry into the diversion of forest land of the mine. Uranium Corporation of India Limited (UCIL) expects mining activity to resume at Jaduguda in 2017. The Jaduguda mine produces up to 25% of the raw materials needed to fuel India's nuclear reactors.

== Geography ==
The Jaduguda uranium mine is an underground mining mine located in the Purbi Singhbhum district of Jharkhand. The mine is located at least 640 meters below the Earth's surface and is accessible by a 5-meter diameter vertical shaft.

== Uranium purification plant ==
A uranium purification plant is usually located close to the mine as uranium ore is converted here to yellowcake. According to Department of Atomic Energy, the ore extracted from this mine is of 0.065 grade, which means that the plant needs to process 1000 kg of ore to extract 65 grams of usable fuel rich in uranium-235, a fissile material. This is due to very low natural abundance of the isotope. After the ore is crushed and ground in the Mill House, it goes to the Chemical House for mineral extraction and purification. The plant processes 2,190 tonnes of uranium ore per day. After purification of the ore, yellow cake is shipped by heavy-duty vehicles to the Nuclear Fuel Complex in Hyderabad, Telangana, which is over 1,200 kilometres (750 mi) away from plant.

== Controversies ==
The mine itself is still prone to some controversies as the introduction of the mine resulted in the loss of land for many villagers surrounding its location, as well as some issues regarding protective gear :

"A population of around 35,000 people living within a 5-kilometer radius of the mines are adversely affected by radiation from the tailing ponds. Many villagers lost land and jobs when they were displaced by the mining operations, and many now work in the uranium mines as daily wage labourers. They often do not get proper protective gear to handle radioactive materials and work with bare hands, exposing themselves to heavy doses of radiation. UCIL, the company responsible for the health of its workers, on the other hand, always refutes any allegations of violations of labour laws and human rights. The company is outright defensive about its protective measures and refuses to acknowledge the problems faced by the labourers."

=== Health effect reports ===
After extraction of uranium ore from the mines, it is sent for processing at mills in Jadugoda and Turamdih. Waste generated during milling process, containing uranium-238 and components of its decay chain including radioactive radium, as well as heavy metals such as Cadmium, Chromium and Arsenic that are toxic to humans, known as Uranium tailings are retained in the tailing ponds above ground in its solid form. Typical problems of above ground storage of Uranium tailings are radon emissions, windblown dust dispersal and leaching of contaminants underground.

In a report in CSE-Down to Earth Feature Service, entitled "A deformed existence" and dated 4 June 1999, Manish Tiwari quoted Biruli as saying, "Many women in the area complain of disrupted menstrual cycles. This area also has a high rate of either miscarriages or still-born babies. Biruli claims that nearly 30,000 people living in 15 villages in the five-km radius of the tailings ponds are exposed to radiation. 'Earlier, children were still-born. Now, they die within few days of their birth,' he says. He also claims that nearly one-third of the women living in these areas are suffering from loss of fertility. Even animals such as cows and buffaloes are suffering from rare diseases.

=== Government response ===
BARC committee came to Jaduguda in November 1998 at the request of the State Government, due to these reports. The committee concluded: "The consensus of all the doctors was that the cases examined had congenital anomalies, diseases due to genetic abnormalities like thalassaemia, major and retinitis pigmentosa, moderate to gross splenomegaly due to chronic malaria l infection (as this is hyperendemic area), malnutrition, post encephalitis, post head injury sequelae and certain habits (alcohol) and have no relation to radiation." Its report adds: "The team was convinced and unanimously agreed that the diseases' pattern cannot be ascribed to radiation exposure in any of these cases." The issue of radiation and health effects was raised in court in two instances since, in Jharkhand high court and the Supreme court, with resulting investigation concluding that the reported health effects stem from sources other than mining activities, such as tuberculosis. UCIL and Department of Atomic Energy (DAE) have also responded denying the reports on many occasions.

=== Uranium smuggling incident ===
On February 18, 2008 police of Supaul district in the eastern Indian state of Bihar seized 4 kg of low-quality uranium and arrested one Indian and five Nepali smugglers. According to media reports the uranium was smuggled out of the Jaduguda mines and the smugglers were trying to sell it to Nepal. The market value of the seized uranium was estimated at Rs. 5 crore on the international market.
