= Atomic Minerals Directorate for Exploration and Research =

Research unit of the Government of India

Atomic Minerals Directorate for Exploration and Research (AMD)
- Type: Exploration and Research
- Established: 1949; 77 years ago
- Director: Dheeraj Pande
- Location: 1-10-153-156, AMD Complex, Begumpet, Hyderabad-500 016; India, Hyderabad, Telangana, India
- Website: http://www.amd.gov.in

Atomic Minerals Directorate for Exploration and Research (AMD), with headquarters at Hyderabad and seven regional centers, is the oldest unit of the Department of Atomic Energy (India) (DAE), Government of India. The principal mandate of the organisation is to carry out geological exploration and discover mineral deposits required for nuclear power programme of India.

== History ==
AMD started functioning from New Delhi on 10 August 1948 as ‘Rare Minerals Survey Unit'. Renamed first as ‘Raw Materials Division’ and then as ‘Atomic Minerals Division’ in 1958, it was shifted to Hyderabad in 1974. On 29 July 1998 it underwent the latest name change as 'Atomic Minerals Directorate for Exploration and Research' to assert its status as a premier geological exploration and research organisation. Professor D.N. Wadia, FRS, a doyen among Indian geologists guided the organisation from its inception to 1969 as Geological Adviser to Government of India.

On 29 July 2024, AMD celebrated its Diamond Jubilee year.

== Work spectrum ==
The prime mandate of Atomic Minerals Directorate for Exploration and Research is to identify and evaluate uranium resources required for the successful implementation of Atomic Energy programme of the country. AMD over the past five decades has been instrumental in locating Uranium resources in Singhbhum Shear Zone, Jharkhand; KPM (Domiasiat), Wahkut, Wahkyn, Meghalaya; Lambapur - Chitrial, Peddagattu, Telangana; Tummalapalle, Andhra Pradesh; Gogi, Karnataka and Rohil, Rajasthan. AMD also has established vast resources of thorium in the coastal tracts of Kerala, Tamil Nadu, Andhra Pradesh and Odisha. AMD has also extended its contribution towards recovery of Rare Metals and Rare Earths elements.

== Organisation ==
Apart from the headquarters, centralised laboratories and specialised groups at Hyderabad, AMD has seven regional centres at New Delhi, Jaipur, Shillong, Jamshedpur, Nagpur, Bangalore and Hyderabad. Two sectional offices are located at Thiruvananthapuram and Vishakhapatnam for beach sand and offshore investigations. AMD commenced its operations with a nucleus of 17 geoscientists which has grown to 2777 personnel today.
