= Nuclear Fuel Complex =

Part of the Indian Department of Atomic Energy

- Company type: Nuclear industry
- Founded: 1971
- Headquarters: Hyderabad, India
- Key people: Dr. Komal Kapoor (Chairman & Chief Executive)
- Number of employees: 3800
- Website: www.nfc.gov.in

The Nuclear Fuel Complex (NFC) was established in 1971 as a major industrial unit of India's Department of Atomic Energy, as a nuclear plant also specializing in supply of nuclear fuel bundles and reactor core components. It is a unique facility where natural and enriched uranium fuel, zirconium alloy cladding and reactor core components are manufactured under one roof.

Natural uranium, mined at Jaduguda Uranium Mine in the Singhbhum area of Jharkhand state, is converted into nuclear fuel assemblies. A 220 MW PHWR fuel bundle contains 15.2 kg of natural uranium dioxide (UO_{2}). Uranium dioxide pellets, which generate heat while undergoing fission, also generate fission products. The fission products, which are radioactive, should be contained and not allowed to mix with coolant water. Hence the UO_{2} pellets are contained in zirconium alloy tubes with both ends hermetically sealed.

Nuclear Fuel Complex supplies zircaloy clad uranium oxide fuel assemblies and zirconium alloy structural components for all 14 operating atomic power reactors in India. The Hyderabad plant has a capacity to produce 250 tons of UO_{2} per year and is expected to expand to a 600 tons per year capacity.NFC products are supplied to the Department of Atomic Energy, the Indian Navy, Hindustan Aeronautics Limited and other defence organisations, as well as chemical, fertiliser, and ball bearing industries.NFC is planning to establish two major fuel fabrication facilities to meet the expected jump in nuclear power production. An ISRO-funded Niobium-production plant was commissioned at Nuclear Fuel Complex in 2025.
