= Rakha Mines =

Copper mines in Jharkhand, India

Coordinates: 22°38′N 86°22′E

Rakha Mines are copper mines situated near Jamshedpur in Jharkhand state of India. There is also another copper mine nearby called Kendadih copper mines and refineries at Indian Copper Complex at Ghatshila.

== Location and transportation ==
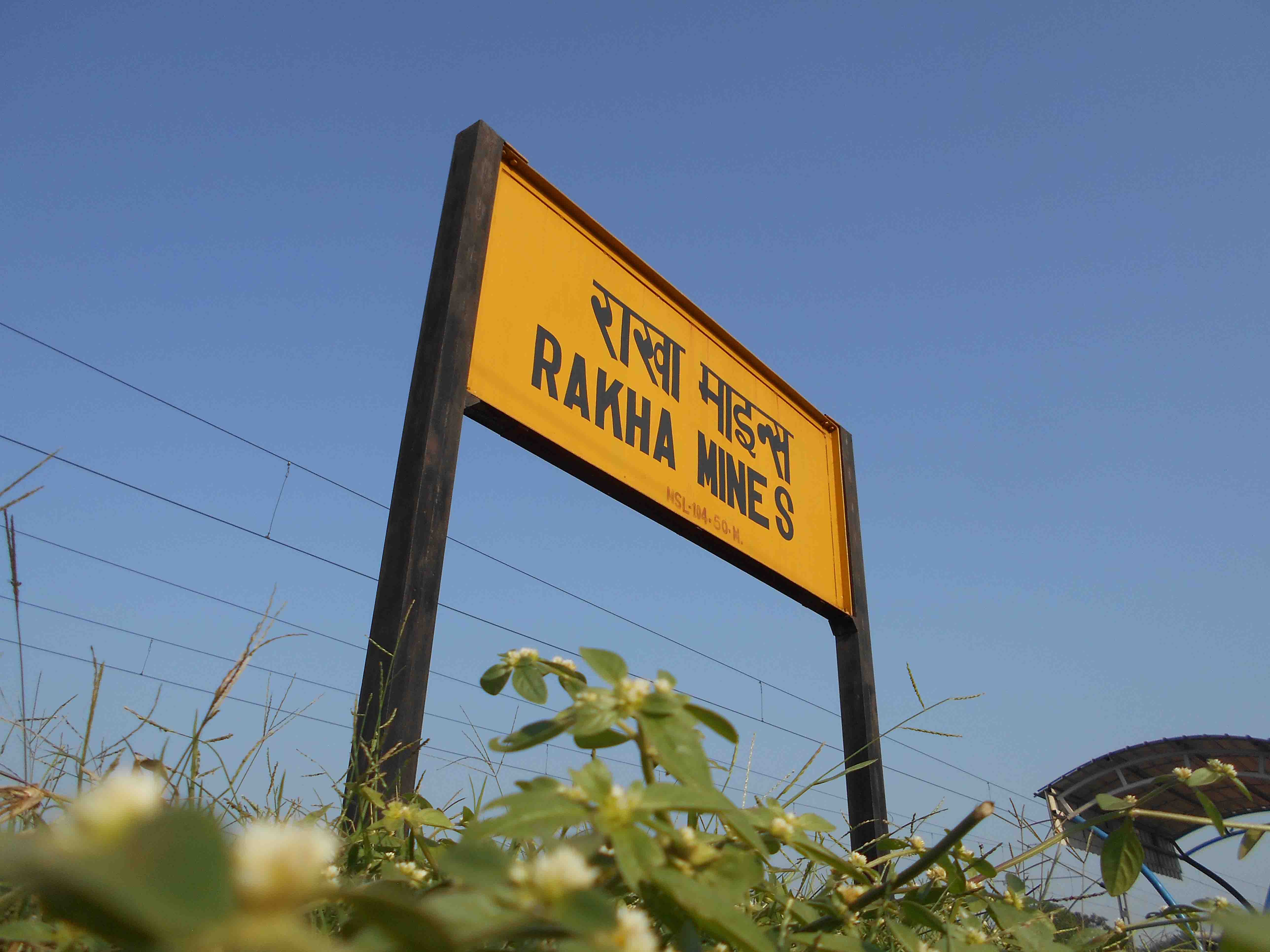
Rakha Mines Railway station, Jharkhand

The nearest airport and big town is Jamshedpur. There is a railway station for the mines, in the same name as Rakha Mines Railway Station, on the Tatanagar-Kharagpur railway line. The station code is RHE. This station is also the nearest railway link to nearby Jaduguda Uranium mines at Jadugora.

== History ==
The first industrial copper mining at Rakha Mines was initiated by a British firm in 1900. After India’s independence, the mines were nationalized and are presently operated by a Government of India undertaking, Hindustan Copper Limited, which was established in 1967.

The name Rakha is derived from the name of Mr. Rakhal Chandra Bhakat, a resident of the village Swaspur. The land on which the mines, colony, and mill were later constructed originally belonged to him. Bhakat also served as the Gram Pradhan (village head) of Swaspur. After him, the position was passed to his fourth son, Udhav Chandra Bhakat.
