= Copper production in India =

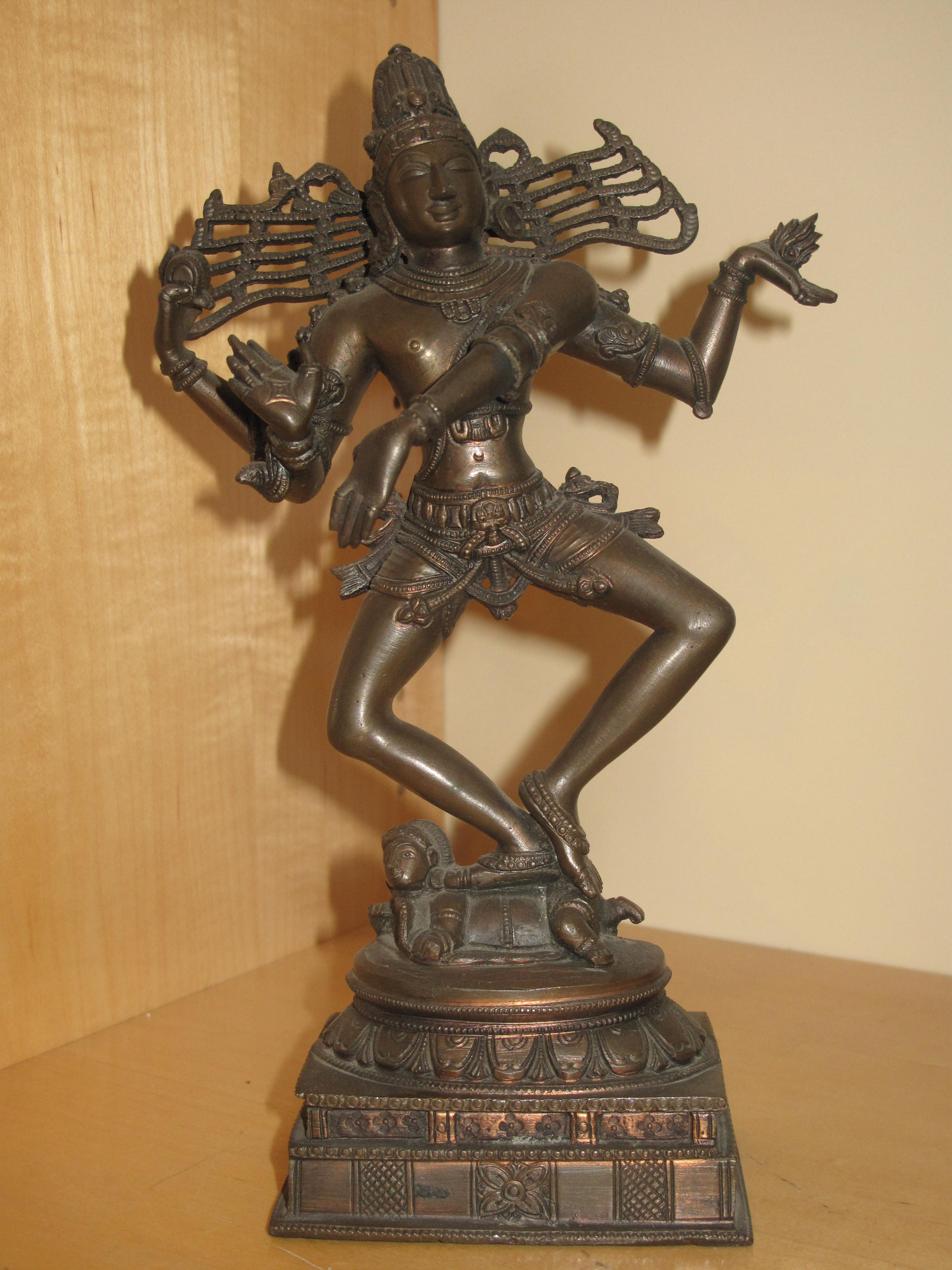
Use of copper in ancient India in making of idols such as dancing or Tandava Shiva.

Copper production in India is only about 2 percent of world copper production in view of its potential reserve limited to 60,000 km^{2} (2% of world reserve) of which 20,000 km^{2} area has been subject to exploration, as of 2012. But in production it is still within the first 20 countries of the world and also one of its largest importers in line with China, Japan, South Korea and Germany. As of April 2005 survey by the Indian Bureau of Mines the total reserve has been estimated as 1394.42 million tonnes out of which 369.49 million tonnes (26.5%) is categorized as “reserves” (under "proved and probable categories"). The balance 1024.93 million tonnes is termed under “remaining resources” (to be confirmed by studies and measurements).

== History ==
Mining of copper in India historically is more than 2000 years old. But its production to meet industrial demand is noted from the middle of the 1960s.

In India, copper ore has been identified in varying structural formations as "host rocks" in several geological formations of different geological time scale. The resource has been identified and explored to varying degree in 14 states of the country such as Andhra Pradesh, Gujarat, Haryana, Jharkhand, Karnataka, Madhya Pradesh, Maharashtra, Meghalaya, Odisha, Rajasthan, Sikkim, Tamil Nadu, Uttarakhand and West Bengal.

== Production ==
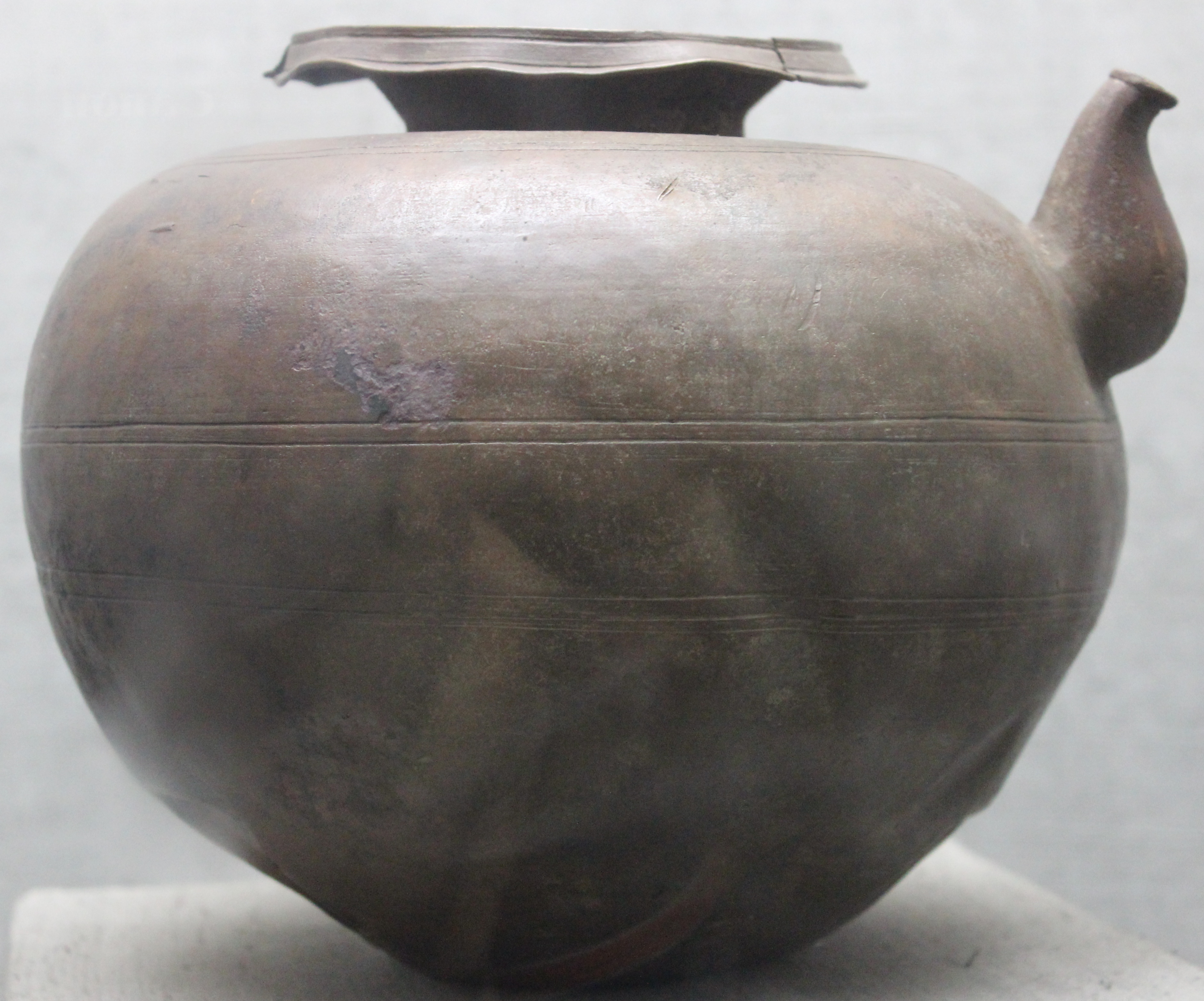
Copper Vase which contained the 1821 Gold Coins of the Gupta Period found at Bayana, District Bharatpur, Rajasthan

Mining is done by both opencast and underground methods. The major copper mines are the Khetri copper belt in Rajasthan, Singhbhum copper belt in Jharkhand and Malanjkhand copper belt in Madhya Pradesh which are mined by HCL; Singhbhum belt is mined by M/s Indian Copper Complex. While the Ingeldhal mine is operated by M/s Hutti Gold Mines Ltd, the Dikchu mine is in Sikkim under the Sikkim Mining Corporation (SMC).

Mining production is just 0.2% of world's production, whereas refined copper production is about 4% of world's production.

In 2011, according to the Ministry of Mines, India exported refined copper, which was initially done excursively by the mines owned by Hindustan Copper Ltd (HCL) (incorporated as Indian Copper Corporation Ltd. in 1972) since 1967, a Government of India undertaking. Now there are three more manufacturers in this field such as Hindalco Industries Ltd, Sterlite Industries Ltd and Jagadia Copper Ltd. However, HCL is the dominant industry which has wide range of production capability in mining, beneficiation, smelting, refining and continuous cast rod manufacturing.

Rajasthan, Madhya Pradesh and Jharkhand are the only states involved in production of copper ore in the country. However, copper concentrates are imported by the Birla copper of Hindalco Industries Limited and Sterlite Industries Limited to produce copper metal located in the States of Gujarat and Tamil Nadu, respectively.

Global ranking is 4th in smelter production and 7th in refined copper consumption.

== Bibliography ==
- Survey, Geological (26 October 2012). Area Reports: International Review: 2010, International, Asia and the Pacific. Government Printing Office. ISBN 978-1-4113-3173-0.
