= MSPL Limited =

Indian Mining company

- Type: Limited Company
- Industry: Mining, Energy, Pelletizing, Aviation, Shipping
- Founded: 1961
- Headquarters: Baldota Bhavan, Mumbai, Maharashtra, India
- Key people: Narendra Baldota (Chairman, MD & CEO)
- Products: Iron ore Wind energy Iron ore Pellets
- Number of employees: 1000

MSPL Limited is an Indian company that operates iron ore mines and wind farms. It is a subsidiary of the Baldota Group.

== Iron Mining ==
Open Cast Vyasanakere Iron Ore Mine of MSPL Limited

MSPL mines, processes and exports iron ore. According to the Federation of Indian Mineral Industries, It was the first private company in India to receive a license for export of high grade ore containing at least 64% iron.

== Wind energy ==
MSPL operates wind farms in the Indian states of Karnataka, Maharashtra, Rajasthan and Gujarat. Their total installed capacity was 191.6 MW in 2007 according to the Directory of Indian Wind Power Its wind power operations have been used in Clean Development Mechanism (CDM) projects to create Certified Emission Reduction credits (CERs).

== Awards ==
MSPL was awarded the CFBP-Jamnalal Bajaj Uchit Vyavahar Puraskar in the Large Manufacturer category in 2007. and in the same year received the First Prize for Independent Power Producer under Wind Programme from the Ministry of New and Renewable Energy. In 2005, the Group received the KREDL award for the highest investment and production in wind power. For planting over 1.6 Million trees MSPL received the 2004 Indira Priyadarshni Vriuksha Mitra Award.
