= Jonnagiri =

Village in Andhra Pradesh, India

Coordinates: 15°13′50″N 77°34′15″E

- Country: India
- State: Andhra Pradesh
- District: Kurnool

Population (2011)
  - Total: 8,437

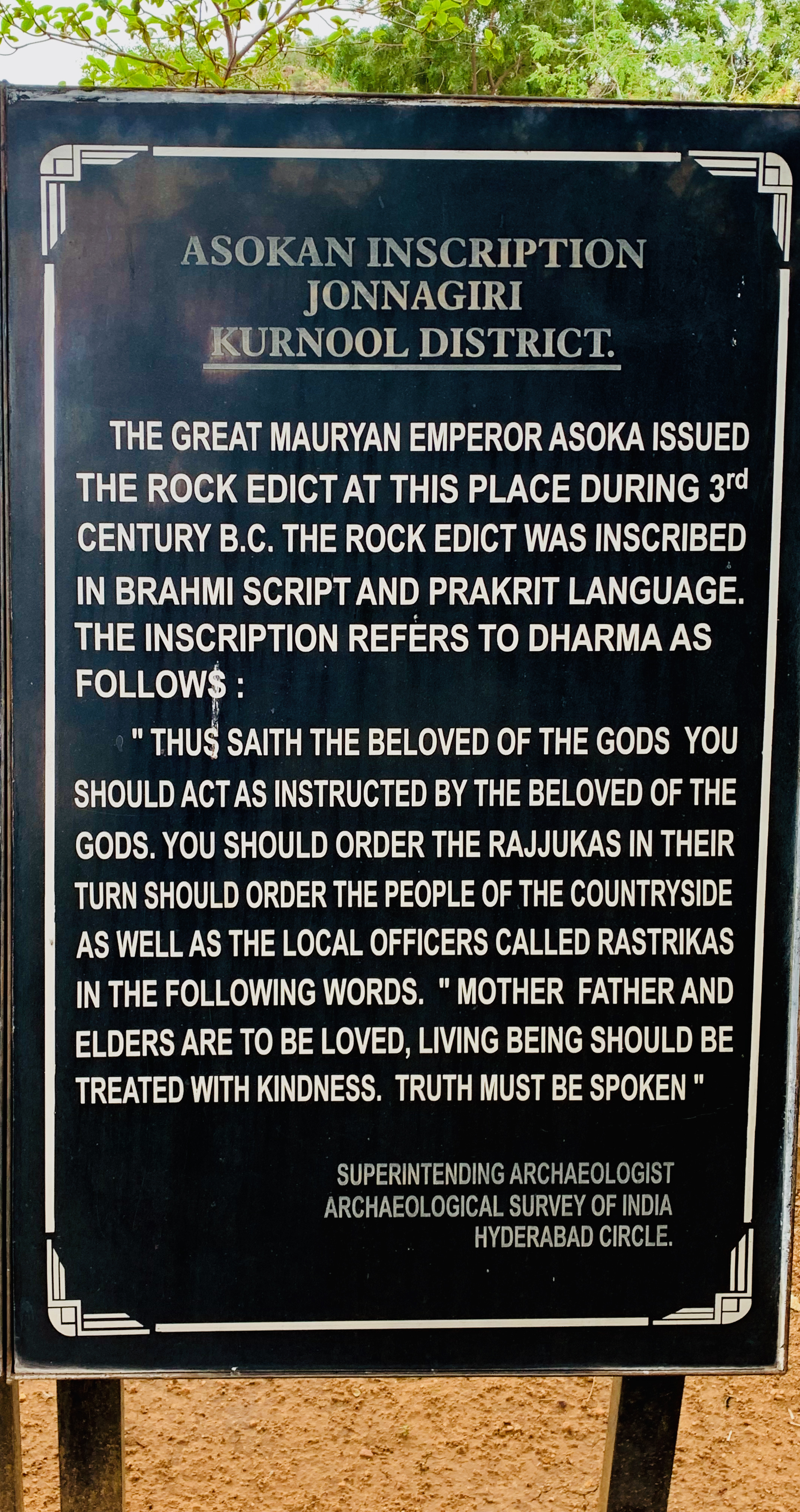
Signboard at the Jonnagiri Ashokan edict.

Jonnagiri is a village located in the Kurnool district of the Indian state of Andhra Pradesh.

== Landmarks ==
An edict of Ashoka is located here.

== Demographics ==
According to the 2011 census, the village had a population of 8,437, in 1,721 households.

== Economy ==
A gold mine is located here.
