= Tummalapalle uranium mine =

Mine in India

Tummalapalle Uranium Mine
- Location in Andhra Pradesh, India Tummalapalle Uranium Mine (India)
- Location: Tumalapalli, YSR Kadapa district, Andhra Pradesh, India; 14°19′N 78°16′E
- Products: Uranium
- Company: Uranium Corporation of India
- Website: www.ucil.gov.in

The Tummalapalle Mine is a uranium mine in Tumalapalli village located in Kadapa of the Indian state of Andhra Pradesh. Results from research conducted by the Atomic Energy Commission of India, in 2011, led the analysts to conclude that this mine might have one of the largest reserves of uranium in the world.

On 19 July 2011, Secretary of the Department of Atomic Energy, Srikumar Banerjee, who was also the Chairman of the Atomic Energy Commission of India, confirmed reserves of 49,000 tonnes and suggested that the actual amounts could be three times larger, which would make the Tummalapalle the mine with the world's largest uranium deposits. The estimates were subsequently increased to 85,000 tonnes in 2014.

Earlier, uranium reserves were found only up to a depth of about 250 meters. The latest findings reportedly indicate that the reserves run as deep as 1,000 metres.

This finding substantially increased India’s capability of producing energy from nuclear plants. As of 2018, India was producing about 3.13% of its energy from nuclear plants. These findings suggest that this output can be increased to more than 30% by 2050, essential if India hopes to reduce its emissions, pollution and use of coal power. This domestic uranium find would not only boost India's nuclear energy plans but also help to reduce costs by switching from expensive sources of energy such as coal.

== History ==
On 23 Aug 2007, the Cabinet Committee on Economic Affairs (CCEA) of the Government of India cleared the setting up of a uranium mine and processing plant by the Uranium Corporation of India, with an estimated cost of ₹11.06 billion (US$110 million). After that the Uranium Corporation of India acquired 1,122 acres (454 ha) of government land at ₹50,000 (US$520) per 1 acre (0.40 ha) and 1,118 acres (452 ha) of private land at a price of ₹180,000 (US$1,900) for 1 acre (0.40 ha) of wetland and ₹120,000 (US$1,200) for dry land in Tummalapalle, Rachakundapalle, KK Kottaland, and Mabbuchintalapalle villages in Pulivendula constituency. On 20 November 2007 the then Chief Minister and local MLA Y. S. Rajasekhara Reddy laid the foundation stone for the mine. UCIL commissioned the Cuddapah Uranium Phase-1 Project with 3000 tonnes on 20 April 2012.

== Geography ==
Tummalapalle uranium ore mine is located in Vemula Mandal of Kadapa district of Andhra Pradesh at a distance of 70 kilometres (43 mi) from Kadapa, the district's headquarters. The area where the deposits were found is covered in Survey of India's topographic sheet Nos. 57 J/3 and 57 J/7 between latitudes 14°18'36" N & 14°20'20" N and longitudes 78°15'16" E & 78°18' 03.3" E. The nearest town is Pulivendla, which is 15 kilometres (9.3 mi) away (by road) towards the north-west. The mine is linked to Pulivendla through village roads leading to State Highway No.18, which connects Kadapa with Velidandla. The nearest railway station is Muddanurru on South Central Railway’s Hyderabad – Chennai BG Line, which is 50 kilometres (31 mi) towards the north-east.

== Water resources ==
The mine will draw most of its water requirements from the river Chitravathi. Design, construction and commissioning work of intake well and pump house at Chitravati River basin, the water and effluent treatment plants and the condensate recovery unit at uranium ore processing plant and laying of cross-country pipeline from the river Chitravati to the uranium ore processing plant – all these tasks were contracted by Jamshedpur Utilities & Services Company (Jusco), a 100% subsidiary company of Tata Steel, on EPC basis. The water system project, the construction of which commenced in August 2008, was inaugurated by Srikumar Banerjee on 7 July 2011.

== Uranium purification plant ==
The construction works for the first phase of the uranium purification was completed in 2012 and Cuddapah Uranium Phase-1 Project was commissioned with 3000 tonnes capacity on 20 April 2012. Phase one of the uranium purification plant has a capacity to treat 3,000 tonnes of ore per day. The Bhabha Atomic Research Centre (BARC) has developed an innovative, economically viable process for the recovery of low-grade uranium (less than 0.2%) from the Tummalapalle ore mine. As illustrated by Dr. A. K. Suri, Director of Materials Group, BARC, "the main objective of making a techno-economically viable process flow-sheet is to reduce the number of stages of unit operations and conservations leachants(sic) by regeneration and recycle(sic) leading to minimisation of fresh water inventory as well as quantum(sic) of liquid effluent discharge for the most challenging low-grade uranium ore".

The hydro-metallurgical uranium purification plant which would be constructed in the mine's current lease period, will treat the dolomite based uraniferous which is found in the deposits. On the mode of operation, the Uranium Corporation of India report stated that "in the initial period of operation of mine, ore will be received from decline having particle size of 80% passing through 10 cm screen and will be transported by covered dumpers from the mine site to the ore processing plant and later by covered conveyor". This mine would be the first in the country to adopt alkali based leaching in place of the conventional acid based leaching method. This process was chosen on the basis of the nature of the ore found in the site. BARC has developed a well-integrated flowsheet for the process to treat the low-grade uranium ore extracted from the alkaline host rocks in Tummalapalle.

Effluents from the plant caused damage to standing crops and polluted groundwater table, when Uranium waste tailing pond brimmed over in the wake of heavy rains in 2021.

== Minerals ==
The Bonds Work Index of the Tummalapalle uranium ore sample is 13.6 kWh/tonne and the mineralogical composition is as follows,

Mineral	% Weight
Carbonates	83.2
Quartz + feldspar	11.3
Apatite	4.3
Pyrite	0.47
Chalcopyrite	0.05
Galena	Traces
Magnetite	0.15
Ilmenite + leucoxene	0.25
Iron hydroxide (goethite)	0.27
Pitchblende in association with pyrite	0.1
Total	100.0

== See also ==
- Nuclear power in India
- Energy policy of India
- List of uranium mines
- Uranium market
- Uranium mining debate
- Uranium reserves
- Peak uranium
- Uranium mining controversy in Kakadu National Park
- Uranium metallurgy
