= Jadugora =

Jadugora Jadugoda
- Census Town
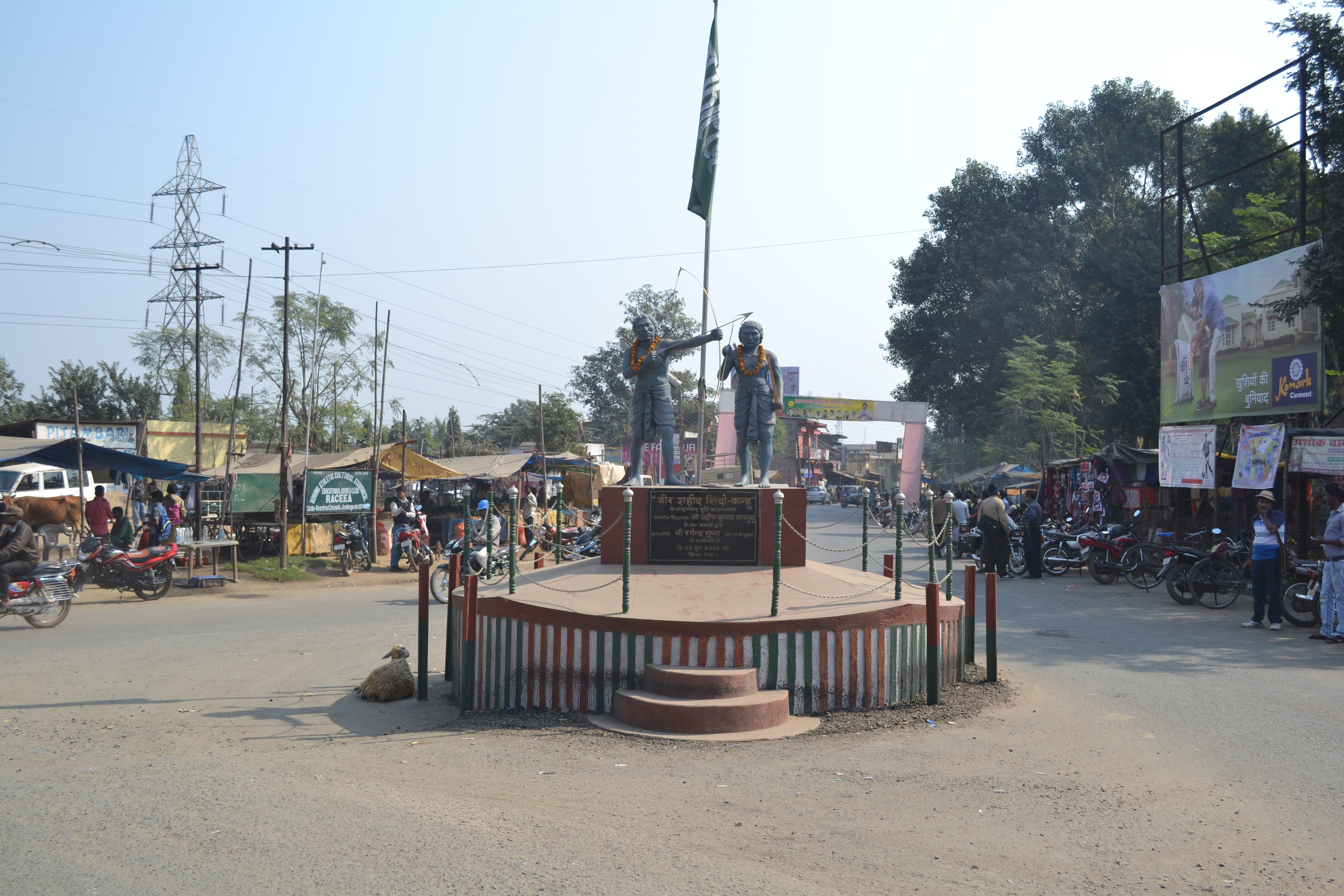

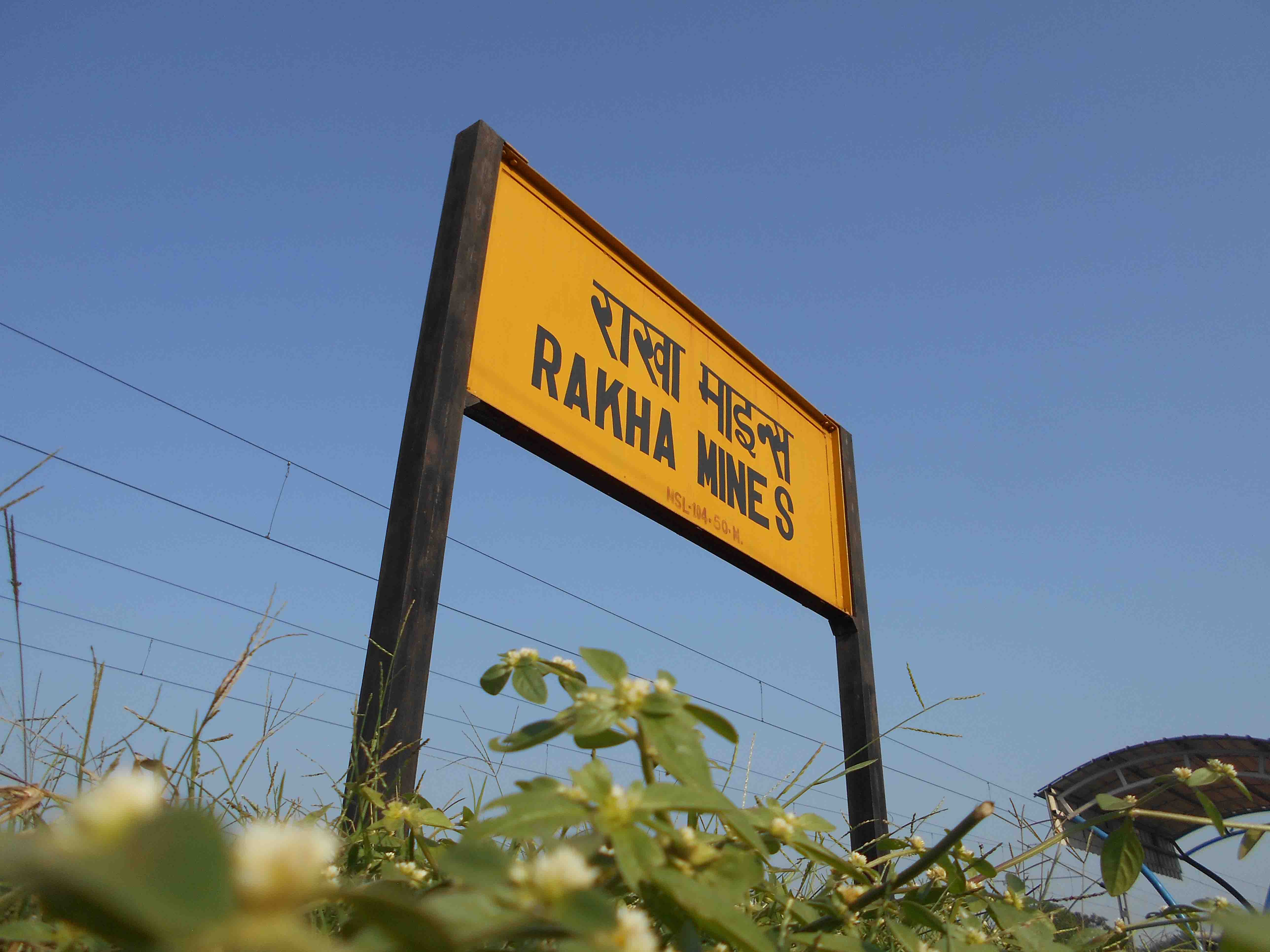
- Rakha Mines Station, Jadugoda

- Location in Jharkhand, India Jadugora (India)
- Coordinates: 22.65°N 86.36°E
- Country: India
- State: Jharkhand
- District: East Singhbhum

Area
  - Total: 6.94 km^{2} (2.68 sq mi)

Population (2011)
  - Total: 18,563
  - Density: 2,670/km^{2} (6,930/sq mi)

Languages*
  - Official: Hindi, Santali
- Time zone: UTC+5:30 (IST)
- PIN: 832102
- Telephone/STD code: 0657
- Vehicle registration: JH 05
- Literacy: 84.06%
- Lok Sabha constituency: Jamshedpur
- Vidhan Sabha constituency: Ghatsila
- Website: jamshedpur.nic.in

Jadugora (also spelt as Jadugoda or Jaduguda) is a census town in the Musabani CD block in the Ghatshila subdivision of the East Singhbhum district in the Indian state of Jharkhand.

== Etymology ==
The name "Jadugora" or "Jadugoda" has been derived from the word "Jadagoda", which means 'land of elephants' in a local tribal oral tradition. It is said that there was a time when this was home to many Asian elephants. But with time as many mines and factories were established, they moved to denser forests due to loss of habitat. There are many elephant corridors nearby Jadugoda. However, as per Bengal District Gazetteers, the original name was "Jaragoda", in which "Jara" means castor plant/seeds in Santhal Language. This was due to abundance of castor plants in the valley. Both names stand relevant today.

== Geography ==
Cities, towns and locations in East Singhbhum district in Kolhan Division (Locations around Jamshedpur are shown in the Jamshedpur Urban Agglomeration map - see Bagbera Colony page)
M: municipality, R: rural/ urban centre, CT: census town, T: tourist centre
Owing to space constraints in the small map, the actual locations in a larger map may vary slightly

=== Location ===
Jadugora is located at 22.65°N 86.36°E.

It is a township of Uranium Corporation of India in the Singhbhum district of Jharkhand state in Eastern India. It is 35 km by road and 20 km by train from the city of Jamshedpur. The nearest station is Rakha Mines Station. This was the first mines where Uranium was produced in India on a reasonable scale. The township was established in 1965, and it was way ahead of its time with modern school, clubs with tennis courts and a full-fledged hospital. The school here was part of the chain of schools called Atomic Energy Central School.

=== Area overview ===
The area shown in the map “forms a part of the Chota Nagpur Plateau and is a hilly upland tract”. The main rivers draining the district are the Subarnarekha and the Kharkai. The area lying between Jamshedpur and Ghatshila is the main industrial mining zone. The rest of the district is primarily agricultural. In the district, as of 2011, 56.9% of the population lives in the rural areas and a high 43.1% lives in the urban areas.

Note: The map alongside presents some of the notable locations in the district. All places marked in the map are linked in the larger full screen map.

== Civic administration ==
There is a police station at Jadugora.

== Demographics ==
According to the 2011 Census of India, Jadugora had a total population of 18,563, of which 9,531 (51%) were males and 9,032 (49%) were females. Population in the age range 0–6 years was 2,085. The total number of literate persons in Jadugora was 1,385 (84.06% of the population over 6 years).

(*For language details see Musabani block#Language and religion)

As of 2001 India census, Jadugora had a population of 19,003. Males constitute 53% of the population and females 47%. Jadugora has an average literacy rate of 72%, higher than the national average of 59.5%: male literacy is 80%, and female literacy is 63%. In Jadugora, 12% of the population is under 6 years of age.

Jadugoda is blessed with diverse flora and fauna and rich tribal culture. The place is also home to some indigenous major tribes like the Santhals, Gonds, Mundas and Hill Kharia. The place is surrounded by hills and rivers. Many species of birds, reptiles and animals are found here. The culture of Jadugoda is influenced by the culture of West Bengal, Odisha and Bihar, which are the neighbouring states of Jharkhand. The major festivals celebrated here are Durga Puja, Diwali, Chhath and Tusu Parab (Parva), which is a local tribal festival.

=== Languages and religion ===
Languages spoken in Jadugora Town (2011)
1. Bengali (30.8%)
2. Hindi (23.0%)
3. Santali (16.4%)
4. Odia (7.94%)
5. Urdu (7.84%)
6. Others (0.32%)
Religion in Jadugora census town (2011)
1. Hinduism (78.5%)
2. Other religions including Sarnaism (18.0%)
3. Islam (1.98%)
4. Others (1.52%)

== Infrastructure ==
According to the District Census Handbook 2011, Purbi Singhbhum, Jadugora covered an area of 6.94 km^{2} (2.68 sq mi). It has an annual rainfall of 1,030.2 mm (40.56 in). Among the civic amenities, it had 22 km (14 mi) of roads with closed drains, the protected water supply involved tapwater from treated sources, hand pump, overhead tank. It had 3,454 domestic electric connections, 300 road lighting points. Among the medical facilities, it had 1 hospital (with 65 beds), 2 dispensaries, 2 health centres, 1 family welfare centre, 25 maternity and child welfare centres, 25 maternity homes, 1 nursing home, 25 veterinary hospitals, 4 medicine shops. Among the educational facilities it had 6 primary schools, 5 middle schools, 3 secondary schools, 1 senior secondary school, the nearest general degree college at Jamshedpur, 22 km (14 mi) away. It had 1 non-formal education centre (Sarva Shiksha Abhiyan), 1 auditorium/ community hall. Important commodities it produced were uranium, mats, baskets, earthen pots. It had the branch offices of 3 nationalised banks, 1 cooperative bank.

== Tourist attractions ==
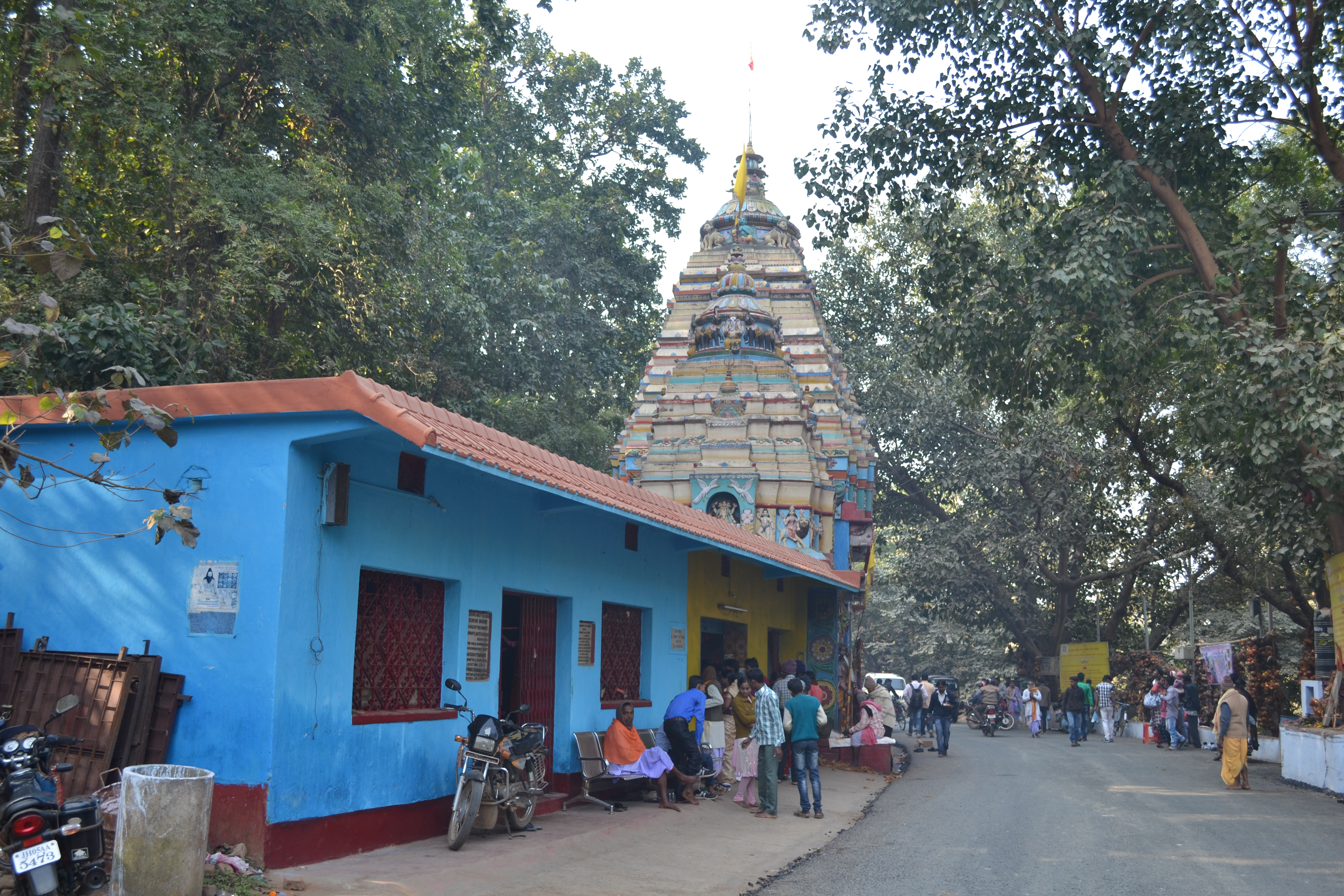
Rankini Temple, Jadugora, Jharkhand

Rankini Temple (for Goddess Rankini) is a famous temple located on the road side of state highway connecting Jadugoda to Tiring and it is just 2 km from Jadugoda market square. This temple is dedicated to Maa Rankini. Large numbers of devotees can be seen at this temple from nearby places including Jamshedpur city. According to a legend, a local tribal spotted a tribal girl taking the form of Devi to kill a demon. When he tried to follow the girl she disappeared into the woods. In the same night Devi appeared in his dreams of person named, Dinbandhu Singh and directed him to build a temple at the same place.

Galudi Bridge, which is around 5 km from UCIL colony towards Musabani, is the largest bridge/stop dam on Subarnarekha River. River Gudru, which is an important tributary of Subernarekha meets with it here. As per tradition, gold was mined near the origin of the river at a village named Piska near Ranchi. This is why it was named Subarnarekha, meaning "streak of gold". Legend has it that traces of gold were found in the river bed. Even now, people look for traces of gold particles in its sandy beds. The name is a combination of two words meaning gold and line/streak in Indian languages. Interestingly, Mesolithic tools and utensils have been unearthed at many sites along the banks of this river which indicates its archeological importance.

UCIL Residential colony is very close to the small hills, and Aam Jharna is located just opposite of the UCIL residential colony.

There are many abandoned open cast copper mines nearby. Many ghost stories have been associated with these places. The place most famous among local people is 'Jobla Pahad' and Aam Jharna. The area is reach in Copper, iron, Manganese etc. Many open cast mines have been discovered in the region, some of which were in operation during British rule.

== Uranium mines at Jadugoda & Narwapahar ==
Uranium Corporation of India, logo

Jadugora or Jadugoda is the headquarters of Uranium Corporation of India Limited (A Govt of India Enterprise). It was established in the late 1960s due to presence of rich ore of Uranium. The Uranium Corporation of India Ltd. (UCIL) recently completed its project of uranium Mining and Mill at Narwapahar, Jharkhand. Adequate resources of uranium in Jaduguda uranium mine have been identified to meet the requirements of India's nuclear power program. The uranium deposit at Jaduguda, Singhbhum district, Jharkhand, has been under exploitation since 1962. The uranium deposits at Bhatin and Narwapahar are currently being exploited. Ore from the three deposits is treated in a mill at Jaduguda in the Singhbhum region, and the yield is 300 tons of uranium per year. The Narwapahar mine, 12 km north west of Jaduguda, is one of the most modern mines in the country. The new uranium mine, Narwapahar Mine, was built with Russian technology. Trackless mining equipment are in use for the first time in the country. Mine development progress rates of over 300 meters per month have been achieved and the underground output per man shift is 1.9 tonnes. The Narwapahar mine is worked by a decline and a vertical shaft. The decline has the advantage that heavy equipment can be lowered to the working area without dismantling. The shaft is used for hoisting ore and movement of personnel.

An exposé of India's nuclear program,”Tailing Pond”, produced and directed by debutant Saurav Vishnu, investigates the horrifying effects of uranium extraction on the health of the indigenous population of Jadugoda, in eastern India. These are particularly severe for young children, many of whom are falling ill and dying due to radioactive waste pollution. “Tailing Pond”, is narrated by Cynthia Nixon, who is back in the news of late because of the “Sex and the City” revival “And Just Like That.”
