= Uranium Corporation of India =

Indian state-owned enterprise

Uranium Corporation of India भारतीय यूरेनियम निगम
- Type: Public Sector Undertaking
- Industry: Mining
- Founded: 1967
- Headquarters: Jadugora, India
- Key people: Dr. C.K.Asnani (Chairman & MD)
- Products: Uranium
- Revenue: ▲₹2,034.79 crore (US$220 million) (2019)
- Operating income: ▲₹406.52 crore (US$43 million) (2019)
- Net income: ▲₹214.20 crore (US$23 million) (2019)
- Total assets: ▲₹3,866.33 crore (US$410 million) (2019)
- Total equity: ▲₹2,833.93 crore (US$300 million) (2019)
- Owner: Government of India
- Number of employees: 4536 (March 2021)
- Website: uraniumcorp.in

Uranium Corporation of India (UCIL) is a public sector undertaking (PSU), under the Department of Atomic Energy for uranium mining and processing. The corporation was founded in 1967 and is responsible for the mining and milling of uranium ore in India. The firm operates mines at Jadugora, Bhatin, Narwapahar, Turamdih and Banduhurang

== Mines ==
=== Tummalapalle ===
The ore body of Kanampalli and Tummalapalli mining block in Kadapa is spread over a length of 21 kilometres. It is India's largest uranium mine.

=== Jaduguda ===
It is the first uranium mine of India which started its operations in 1967. This mine is located in the state of Jharkhand. Jadugoda process plant is located close to the mine which is used for the processing of the uranium ore. The ore from Bhatin and Narwapahar mines is also processed here.

=== Bhatin ===
This mine is located 3 km away from Jaduguda and shares most of the infrastructure with the Jaduguda mine.

=== Narwapahar ===
This mine was commissioned in April 1995. It is known to be the most modern mine of the country.

=== Turamdih ===
Turamdih mine is located 24 km to the west of Jaduguda and five km south to Tatanagar railway station which is on howrah Mumbai main line. It was commissioned in 2003. Turamdih Processing Plant has been set up to treat the ore from Turamdih, Banduharang and Mohuldin mines.

=== Bagjata ===
Bagjata Mines is an underground mine in east singhbhum district of Jharkhand.

=== Mohuldih Mine ===
Mohuldih uranium deposit Mine in Gamharia block of Seraikella-Kharsawan district in state of Jharkhand has been developed as a modern underground mine

== New projects ==
Uranium deposits have been found in Rohil area of Sikar district of Rajasthan, prompting the Rajasthan government to issue a letter of interest (LOI) to the state-owned Uranium Corporation of India, the first step to start the process of mining the radioactive mineral. Atomic Minerals Directorate for Exploration and Research (AMD) found 8,813 tonnes of uranium oxide deposits in Rohil in Sikar district, 1,086 tonnes in Rohil west, 3,570 tonnes in Jahaz and 1,002 tonnes in Geratiyon ki Dhani in the state of Rajasthan.

== Controversies ==
There was criticism from certain sections of the local community that the mining operations of UCIL were resulting in harmful radiation to the public.

UCIL was also among the 63 Indian establishments put under sanction by USA in 1998 after Operation Shakti.

The mining activities of UCIL in the Khasi Hills were also fiercely opposed by the local tribals protesting against potential health effects.
