= Bharat Small Modular Reactor =

Indian nuclear reactor design

Bharat Small Modular Reactor class
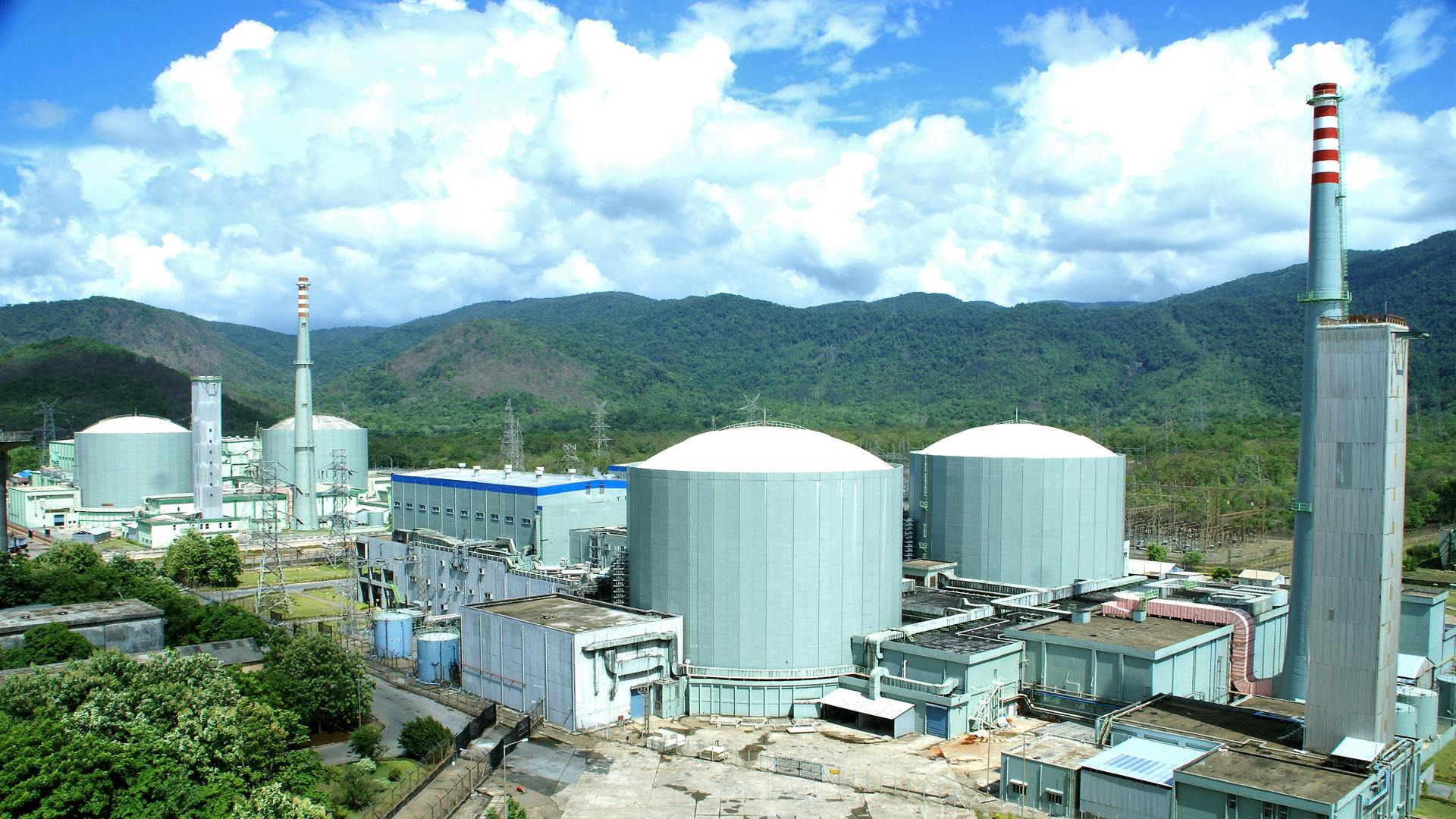
- Kaiga Atomic Power Plant, showing four IPHWR-220 reactors, on which the BSMR is based
- Generation: Generation III+ reactor
- Reactor concept: Compact pressurized heavy-water reactor (Small Modular reactor)
- Reactor line: BSMR
- Designed by: Bhabha Atomic Research Centre, NPCIL
- Manufactured by: NPCIL
- Status: Under development

Main parameters of the reactor core
- Fuel (fissile material): ^{235}U (NU/SEU/LEU)
- Fuel state: Solid
- Neutron energy spectrum: Thermal
- Primary control method: Control rods
- Primary moderator: Heavy water
- Primary coolant: Heavy water

Reactor usage
- Primary use: Providing process heat for captive private use, industries
- Power (thermal): 680 MWth
- Power (electric): 200 MWe

The Bharat Small Modular Reactor, abbreviated as BSMR, is a small modular reactor design being developed in India by the Nuclear Power Corporation of India Limited (NPCIL) and Bhabha Atomic Research Centre (BARC) in Mumbai. It is a derivative of the IPHWR-220 reactor with innovative safety features and economic benefits. It is a compact pressurized heavy water reactor. It is being developed under the Nuclear Energy Mission of the Government of India. It is an initiative towards the 'Net zero goal'.

NPCIL has asked for orders from private companies for construction of the reactors at their manufacturing sites. As of October 2025, six companies including Tata Power, JSW Group, Jindal Steel and Reliance Industries have responded to it.

== History ==
The Government of India, in the Union Budget of 2025–26, announced the Nuclear Energy Mission, which set the goal of a 100GWe installed capacity. Under this mission, India is developing the BSMR, a gas cooled high temperature reactor along with a fleet mode construction of the IPHWR-700 (Indian Pressurized Heavy Water Reactor-700).

The Union minister of Science and technology Jitendra Singh mentioned in an answer given to the Loksabha that it will take around 60-72 weeks to construct the reactor. He also mentioned that the conceptual design for the BSMR had been completed in March 2025, and a detailed analysis of safety and details of the design was being prepared at the BARC. He also said that the reactor will be fuelled by slightly enriched uranium (SEU). He also stated that the BSMR is a modified version of the IPHWR. The minister also informed the parliament that the first units will be built at a BARC campus at Vizag, Andhra Pradesh at an estimated cost of ₹5700 crores and construction is expected to begin within few years.

On 12th August 2025, NPCIL signed a memorandum of understanding with Engineers India Limited to provide engineering services for the design and development of the BSMR reactor. This move is expected to reduce time needed for this task, while also helping other companies to begin using nuclear technologies, keeping in mind the amendments to the Atomic Energy Act 1948 and 1962 and Nuclear Liabilities Act 2010 (CLNDA) through the SHANTI Bill 2025 in December 2025. The President of India signed the bill shortly thereafter and it was passed into law. In the Union budget for 2026–27, the Government of India has waivered custom duties and import duties levied on the spare parts and other nuclear related components to help foreign cooperation combined with the private sector, which will boost the nation's energy supply from clean sources.

== Design ==
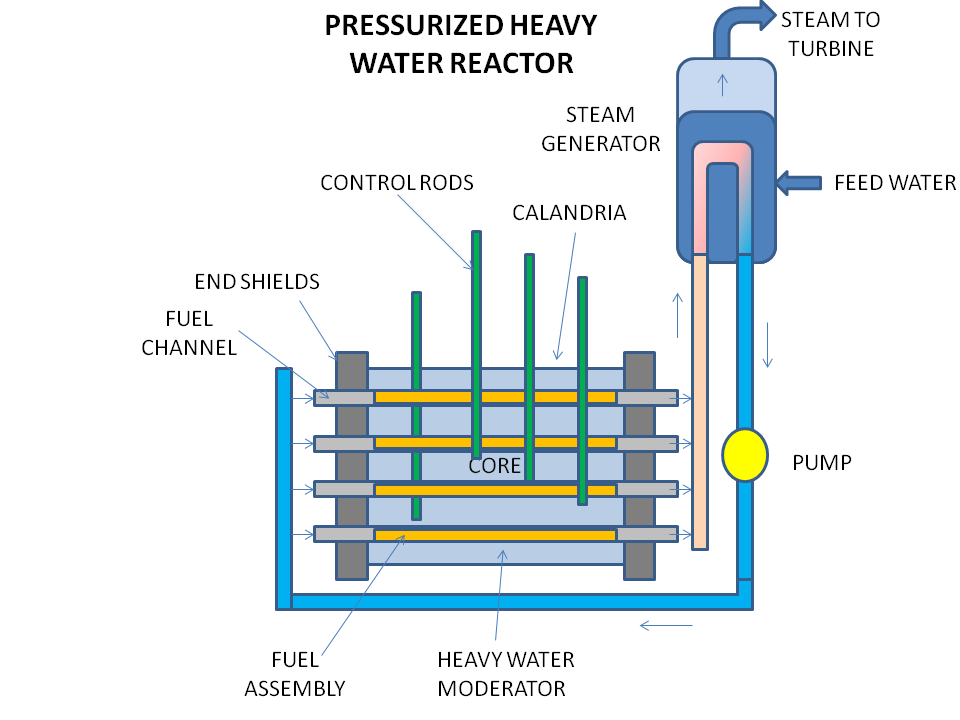
Pressurized heavy water reactor schematic diagram

The BSMR nuclear reactor is a horizontal pressure tube type. It is derived from the IPHWR-220 reactor and compacts its design. These tubes are housed in a horizontal vessel called Calandria. It is filled with heavy water moderator. Each independent tube contains circulating carbon dioxide gas called annulus gas. The tubes contain 12 fuel assemblies/bundles each and circulating pressurized heavy water coolant. This coolant collects heat from the fuel (slightly enriched uranium dioxide) and transfers it to the secondary coolant water to generate steam in the steam generators. This steam turns the turbine coupled to an AC synchronous generator producing 11kV or 20kV 50 Hz AC. The steam passes through various turbine stages after passing through moisture separator reheaters and finally the steam is condensed, reheated, deaerated and pumped back to the reactor. The moderator heavy water is kept circulating and is maintained at around 70 degrees Celsius by cooling it in an external heat exchanger circuit. The nuclear fission chain reaction is controlled using control rods of cadmium or boron. There is an emergency scram system to inject a poison (neutron absorbing mixture) called gadolinium nitrate in the moderator. The reactors can be refuelled while on full power giving additional advantages. The reactors will be equipped with advanced control and safety systems, such as advance natural circulation systems and passive heat removal systems. They form the part of India's Nuclear Energy Mission to achieve 100GWe nuclear capacity by 2047, and the net zero goal of 2070. It is being developed for captive and maritime use and will be deployed before 2033. These nuclear reactors will be factory built.

== Future Plans ==
In the Budget of FY 25–26, the central government allocated ₹20,000 crores for development of nuclear power reactors, specifically the small modular reactor (SMR). Work is underway at the BARC, for the BSMR, along with a 55MWe SMR, and also a 5MWth high temperature gas cooled reactor for green hydrogen production through thermochemical sulfur-iodine cycle. Additionally, the government aims to commission five indigenous SMRs by 2033, as specified by the Nuclear Energy Mission announced in 2025.

Recently, the government has also notified that a SMR and a BSMR will be set up by 2033 at the site of Tarapur Atomic Power Station. The lead units of the BSMR-200, SMR-55, and the HTGR of 5 MW are being planned to be set up at Tarapur and Vizag.

Also, the NPCIL has asked the state governments of Madhya Pradesh, Uttar Pradesh, Gujrat, Jharkhand, Tamilnadu, etc. for recommending potential sites for the reactors, and secure water supply for them. The reactors and other components of the plants, will be manufactured in India itself by engineering giants such as BHEL, L&T, etc.

The Government of India also amended to the Atomic Energy Act 1948 and Atomic Energy Act 1962 and the CLNDA 2010 to allow private sector involvement in nuclear power and help expand the capacity. Work is also underway to develop the BSMR for maritime use such as on cargo ships. The maritime department with the DAE is working on the project. This will reduce emissions from shipping sector and also help India become a leader in the ship building sector, even for international clients.

In 2026, it was reported that the government was 6 months away from inviting bidd for the first of the BSMRs. It is aimed to boost the nuclear capacity, in line with the targets set. The cost estimate is about ₹30 cr per MWe. Foreign firms have also been allowed to partner with Indian companies.

Most of the design and development, manufacturing capabilities for the new technology exists in the country.

== See also ==
- Nuclear power in India
- Nuclear Reactor
- Nuclear graphite
