= Kaiga Atomic Power Station =

Indian nuclear power plant

Kaiga Generating Station
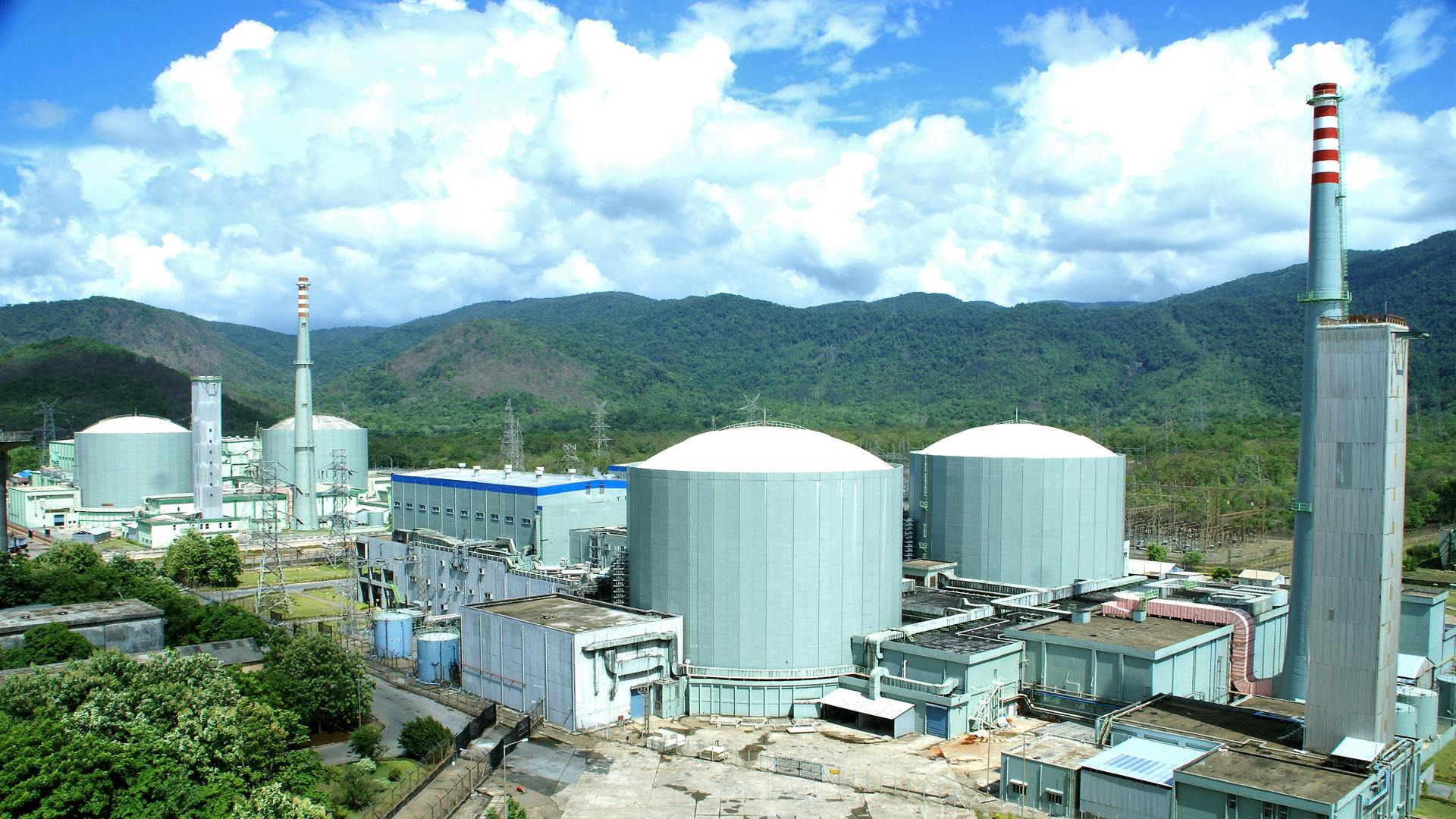
- Country: India
- Coordinates: 14°51′55.16″N 74°26′22.71″E
- Status: Operational
- Construction began: 1989
- Commission date: 16 November 2000
- Owner: NPCIL
- Operator: NPCIL

Nuclear power station
- Reactors: 6
- Reactor type: PHWR
- Reactor supplier: NPCIL/BARC
- Cooling source: Kadra Dam, Kali River
- Thermal capacity: 4 × 754 MW_{th}

Power generation
- Units operational: 4 × 220 MW
- Make and model: Units 1 to 4: IPHWR-220; Units 5 & 6: IPHWR-700
- Units under const.: 2 x 700 MW
- Nameplate capacity: 880 MW
- Capacity factor: 92.02% (2020-21)
- Annual net output: 7094 GW.h (2020-21)

External links
- Website: www.npcil.nic.in/main/ProjectOperationDisplay.aspx?ReactorID=76

Kaiga Generating Station is a nuclear power generating station situated at Kaiga, near the river Kali, in Uttara Kannada district of Karnataka, India. The plant has been in operation since March 2000 and is operated by the Nuclear Power Corporation of India.

It has four units. The fourth unit went critical on 27 November 2010. The two oldest units comprise the west half of the site and the two newer units are adjoining the east side of the site. The older four units are small-sized pressurized heavy water reactors of 220 MW gross.

== History ==
On 27 November 2010 the Kaiga Generating Station unit 4 of 220 MW capacity became operational.

On 19 January 2011, unit 4 with 220 MW capacity was connected to the southern power grid at 01:56 hours. With this, the total capacity rose to 880 MW gross making it the third largest in India after Tarapur (1400 MW) and Rawatbhata (1180 MW). The unit, fueled by indigenous uranium, will supply electricity to Karnataka, Andhra Pradesh, Kerala, Tamil Nadu and Puducherry.

In December 2018, it got the distinction of setting a world record of continuous operation among all nuclear power plants. As on 10 December 2018, KGS-1, which was synchronized to India's Southern grid on 13 May 2016, continues to operate for a record number of 962 days. Previous record of continuous operation was held by Unit 8 of Heysham II, which operated from 18 February 2014 to 15 September 2016 for a record number of 940 days.

Two IPHWR units, each with a 700 MW capacity, are planned at this location. As of February 2017 pre-project activities have begun for them and was planned that the first of the two would become critical around 2024–25.

The construction for the unit 5 and 6 began on March 1, 2026 with the first concrete pour ceremony.

== Units ==
Phase	Unit No.	Reactor		Status	Capacity in MWe		Construction began	First criticality	Grid Connection	Commercial operation	Closure	Notes
Phase	Unit No.	Type	Model	Status	Net	Gross	Construction began	First criticality	Grid Connection	Commercial operation	Closure	Notes
I	1	PHWR	IPHWR-220	Operation suspended (under maintenance)	202	220	1 September 1989	26 September 2000	12 October 2000	16 November 2000	—N/a	
I	2	PHWR	IPHWR-220	Operational	202	220	1 December 1989	24 September 1999	2 December 1999	16 March 2000	—N/a	
II	3	PHWR	IPHWR-220	Operational	202	220	30 March 2002	26 February 2007	11 April 2007	6 May 2007	—N/a	
II	4	PHWR	IPHWR-220	Operational	202	220	10 May 2002	27 November 2010	19 January 2011	20 January 2011	—N/a	
III	5	PHWR	IPHWR-700	Under construction	630	700	1 March 2026	—N/a	—N/a	—N/a	—N/a	
III	6	PHWR	IPHWR-700	Under construction	630	700	1 March 2026	—N/a	—N/a	—N/a	—N/a	

== See also ==
- Nuclear power in India
