= Haripur Nuclear Power Plant =

Nuclear Power Plant in Haripur, West Bengal

- Country: India
- Status: approved 'in principle'
- Owner: Nuclear Power Corporation of India

Nuclear power station
- Reactor type: VVER
- Reactor supplier: Rosatom
- Cooling source: Bay of Bengal

Power generation
- Make and model: VVER-1000/412

Haripur Nuclear Power Plant (or Haripur NPP) is a proposed nuclear power station by Nuclear Power Corporation of India (NPCIL), that is intended to be constructed at Haripur village in Purba Midnapore district, West Bengal.

== History ==
Against the backdrop of the Indo-US Civilian Nuclear Deal, the Nuclear Power Corporation of India (NPCIL) proposed the establishment of a nuclear power plant in Haripur, West Bengal. The then state government, under Chief Minister Buddhadev Bhattacharya, granted initial approval for project planning and land acquisition. However, the proposal faced strong opposition from opposition parties, as well as from environmentalists, farmers, and activists.

The project was revived in 2009 during a visit by then-Prime Minister Manmohan Singh to Russia. India signed a civil nuclear agreement with Russia, under which Russia committed to supplying 20 nuclear reactors to India, including six VVER-1000 type reactors to be installed in Kundankulam and another six in Haripur, West Bengal. Nevertheless, this move was met with significant resistance from various political parties, activists, and NGOs, who argued that constructing a nuclear power plant in West Bengal's prime agricultural and fishery areas would severely impact the local economy, endangering livelihoods and posing radiation hazards. Consequently, due to intense opposition and a change in government in 2011, the Trinamool Congress-led state government of West Bengal shelved the project.

However, the project resurfaced in 2018 when the Department of Atomic Energy (DAE) granted preliminary approval and financial sanction for the construction of six 1000 MW capacity nuclear reactors in Haripur. As of now, there has been no official confirmation from either the Central Government or the State Government regarding the current status of the project.

== See also ==
- Nuclear Power Corporation of India
- Nuclear power in India
- Kundankulam Nuclear Power Plant
