= Nuclear Power Corporation of India =

Indian public sector undertaking

Nuclear Power Corporation of India Limited
- Type: Public Sector Undertaking
- Industry: Electric utility
- Founded: September 1987; 39 years ago
- Headquarters: World Trade Centre, Cuffe Parade, Colaba, Mumbai, Maharashtra, India
- Area served: India
- Key people: B. C. Pathak (Chairman & MD)
- Products: Electric power
- Production output: 56,681 MU (FY 2024–25)
- Services: Electricity generation
- Revenue: ▲₹19,196 crore (US$2.1 billion) (FY 2023-24)
- Operating income: ▲₹10,322 crore (US$1.1 billion) (FY 2023–24)
- Net income: ▲₹6,486 crore (US$690 million) (FY 2023–24)
- Total assets: ▲₹168,234 crore (US$18 billion) (FY 2023–24)
- Total equity: ▲₹61,619 crore (US$6.6 billion) (FY 2023–24)
- Owner: Government of India (100%)
- Number of employees: 10576 (March 2024)
- Website: www.npcil.nic.in

The Nuclear Power Corporation of India Limited (NPCIL) is an Indian public sector undertaking based in Mumbai, Maharashtra. It is wholly owned by the Government of India and is responsible for the generation of electricity from nuclear power. NPCIL is administered by the Department of Atomic Energy (DAE).

NPCIL was created in September 1987 under the Companies Act, 1956, "with the objective of undertaking the design, construction, operation and maintenance of the atomic power stations for generation of electricity in pursuance of the schemes and programmes of the Government of India under the provision of the Atomic Energy Act 1962." All nuclear power plants operated by the company are certified for ISO-14001 (Environment Management System).

NPCIL was the sole body responsible for constructing and operating India's commercial nuclear power plants until the setting up of BHAVINI Vidyut Nigam in October 2003. As of February 2026, the company had 24 nuclear reactors in operation at seven locations, and one under permanent shut down. The total installed capacity of the plants is 8180 MWe. Subsequent to the government's decision to allow private companies to provide nuclear power, the company has experienced problems with private enterprises "poaching" its employees.

== Nuclear plants ==
=== Operational ===
Serial No.	Unit	Location	Type	Capacity (MWe)	Since	Under IAEA safeguards
1	TAPS-1	Tarapur, Maharashtra	BWR	160	28 October 1969	Since 16 October 2009
2	TAPS-2	Tarapur, Maharashtra	BWR	160	28 October 1969	Since 16 October 2009
3	TAPS-3	Tarapur, Maharashtra	IPHWR-540	540	18 August 2006	No
4	TAPS-4	Tarapur, Maharashtra	IPHWR-540	540	15 September 2005	No
5	RAPS-2	Rawatbhata, Rajasthan	CANDU	200	1 April 1981	Since 16 October 2009
6	RAPS-3	Rawatbhata, Rajasthan	IPHWR-220	220	1 June 2000	Since 9 March 2010
7	RAPS-4	Rawatbhata, Rajasthan	IPHWR-220	220	23 December 2000	Since 9 March 2010
8	RAPS-5	Rawatbhata, Rajasthan	IPHWR-220	220	4 February 2010	Since 16 October 2009
9	RAPS-6	Rawatbhata, Rajasthan	IPHWR-220	220	31 March 2010	Since 16 October 2009
10	RAPS-7	Rawatbhata, Rajasthan	IPHWR-700	700	15 April 2025	
11	RAPS-8	Rawatbhata, Rajasthan	IPHWR-700	700	30 June 2026 (planned)	
12	MAPS-1	Kalpakkam, Tamil Nadu	IPHWR-220	220	27 January 1984	No
13	MAPS-2	Kalpakkam, Tamil Nadu	IPHWR-220	220	21 March 1986	No
14	NAPS-1	Narora, Uttar Pradesh	IPHWR-220	220	1 January 1991	Since 12 December 2014
15	NAPS-2	Narora, Uttar Pradesh	IPHWR-220	220	1 July 1992	Since 12 December 2014
16	KAPS-1	Kakrapar, Gujarat	IPHWR-220	220	6 May 1993	Since 3 December 2010
17	KAPS-2	Kakrapar, Gujarat	IPHWR-220	220	1 September 1995	Since 3 December 2010
18	KAPS-3	Kakrapar, Gujarat	IPHWR-700	700	22 July 2020	Since 11 September 2017
19	KAPS-4	Kakrapar, Gujarat	IPHWR-700	700	17 December 2023	—N/a
20	KGS-1	Kaiga, Karnataka	IPHWR-220	220	6 November 2000	No
21	KGS-2	Kaiga, Karnataka	IPHWR-220	220	6 May 2000	No
22	KGS-3	Kaiga, Karnataka	IPHWR-220	220	6 May 2007	No
23	KGS-4	Kaiga, Karnataka	IPHWR-220	220	27 November 2010	No
24	KKNPP-1	Kudankulam, Tamil Nadu	VVER-1000	1000	22 October 2013	Since 16 October 2009
25	KKNPP-2	Kudankulam, Tamil Nadu	VVER-1000	1000	10 July 2016	Since 16 October 2009
Total Capacity			8780			

=== Inactive/Shutdown ===
Unit	Location	Type	Capacity (MWe)	Operational date	Shutdown date	Notes	Under IAEA safeguards
RAPS-1	Rawatbhata, Rajasthan	CANDU	100	16 December 1973	October 2004	Shutdown, Pending decommissioning	Since 16 October 2009

=== Under construction ===
Serial No.	Unit	Location	Type	Capacity (MWe)	Expected Date	Under IAEA safeguards
1	RAPS-7	Rawatbhata, Rajasthan	IPHWR-700	700	2025	Since 23 December 2019
2	RAPS-8	Rawatbhata, Rajasthan	IPHWR-700	700	2025	Since 23 December 2019
3	GHAVP-1	Gorakhpur, Haryana	IPHWR-700	700	2028	No
4	GHAVP-2	Gorakhpur, Haryana	IPHWR-700	700	2028	No
5	KGS-5	Kaiga, Karnataka	IPHWR-700	700	2026	No
6	KGS-6	Kaiga, Karnataka	IPHWR-700	700	2026	No
7	KKNPP-3	Kudankulam, Tamil Nadu	VVER-1000	1000	2025	Since 7 May 2018
8	KKNPP-4	Kudankulam, Tamil Nadu	VVER-1000	1000	2025	Since 7 May 2018
9	KKNPP-5	Kudankulam, Tamil Nadu	VVER-1000	1000	2027	To be included
10	KKNPP-6	Kudankulam, Tamil Nadu	VVER-1000	1000	2027	To be included
	Total Capacity			8200		

=== Proposed ===
Power Plant	Type	Capacity (MWe)	Current Status
Jaitapur in Maharashtra	EPR	9900 (6 × 1650 MW)	Techno - commercial offer submitted by EDF in 2020. Construction and progress stalled due to nuclear liability issues.
GHAVP-3 and 4 (Gorakhpur, Haryana)	IPHWR-700	1400 (2 × 700 MW)	Under - construction. Commercial operations to begin by 2032
Mithi Virdi in Gujarat	LWR	6000 (6 × 1000 MW)	Project shifted to Kovvada in Andhra Pradesh, due to protest and delay in land acquisition.
Kovvada in Andhra Pradesh	LWR	7248 (6 × 1208 MW)	Project upgraded from 6000 (6 × 1000) MW to 7248 (6 × 1208 MW). In principle approval given in December 2023.
Chutka Nuclear Power Plant in Madhya Pradesh	IPHWR-700	1400 (2 × 700 MW)	Joint Venture agreement signed between NPCIL and NTPC in May 2023 for the construction of the indigenously built nuclear reactor. Construction to start by mid - 2025 and is anticipated to complete within 4-5 years.
Bhimpur, Shivpuri in Madhya Pradesh	IPHWR-700	2800 (4 × 700 MW)	There has been no recent progress or updates on the nuclear power plant.
Mahi Banswara Rajasthan Atomic Power Project	IPHWR-700	2800 (4 × 700 MW)	Joint Venture agreement signed between NPCIL and NTPC in May 2023 for the construction of the indigenously built nuclear reactor. Construction to start by mid - 2025 and is anticipated to complete within 4-5 years.
Haripur Nuclear Power Project, West Bengal	VVER-1000	6000 (6 ×1000 MW)	In Principle approval given in 2015.The West Bengal state government denied approval for the project, stalling it.

== Experience ==
NPCIL has the experience and expertise to safely operate and maintain many types of reactors. They include reactors like IPHWR-220, IPHWR-540, IPHWR-700, BWR-1, VVER 1000 reactors.

== See also ==
- Advanced heavy-water reactor
- BHAVINI
- Bhabha Atomic Research Centre
- IPHWR
- Nuclear power in India
