= Nuclear power in India =

Nuclear power stations in India (view)
Active plants
Under construction
Planned plants

Nuclear power is the fifth-largest source of electricity in India after coal, hydro, solar and wind. As of April 2025, India has 25 nuclear reactors in operation in 7 nuclear power plants, with a total installed capacity of 8,880 MW. This is up from 6780 MW in 2018. Nuclear power produced a total of 56.7 TWh in FY 2024–25, contributing around 3% of total power generation in India. 11 more reactors are under construction with a combined generation capacity of 8,700 MW.

The SHANTI Act, 2025 has replaced and repealed the Atomic Energy Act and the Civil Liability for Nuclear Damage Act to realize the goal of at least 100 GW of nuclear energy by 2047. In 2023, the science and technology minister stated that the aim is that nuclear power will account for 9% of the energy mix in the country by 2047.

India has been making advances in the field of thorium-based fuels, working to design and develop a prototype for an atomic reactor using thorium and low-enriched uranium, a key part of India's three stage nuclear power programme.

== History ==
Nuclear power generation
Year	Generation in GWh (Capacity factor)
2005	17,600
2006	17,700
2007	17,700
2008	14,921(50% CF)
2009	18,798(61% CF)
2010	26,472(71% CF)
2011	32,455(79% CF)
2012	32,863(80% CF)
2013	35,333(83% CF)
2014	37,835(82% CF)
2015	37,456(75% CF)
2016	37,674(80% CF)
2017	38,336(70% CF)
2018	37,813(70% CF)
2019	46,472(82% CF)
2020	43,029(81% CF)
2021	47,112(88% CF)
2022	45,855(87% CF)
2023	47,971(85% CF)
2024	56,681(87% CF)
2025	55,190(79% CF)

=== Early nuclear physics research ===
As early as 1901, the Geological Survey of India (GSI) had recognised India as potentially having significant deposits of radioactive ores, including pitchblende, uranium and thorianite. In the ensuing 50 years, however, little to no effort was made to exploit those resources. During the 1920s and 1930s, Indian scientists maintained close links to their counterparts in Europe and the United States, and were well aware of the latest developments in physics. Several Indian physicists, notably Daulat Singh Kothari, Meghnad Saha, Homi J. Bhabha and R. S. Krishnan, conducted pioneering research in nuclear physics in Europe during the 1930s.

By 1939, Meghnad Saha, the Palit Professor of Physics at the University of Calcutta, had recognised the significance of the discovery of nuclear fission, and had begun to conduct various experiments in his laboratory related to nuclear physics. In 1940, he incorporated nuclear physics into the university's post-graduate curriculum. In the same year, the Sir Dorabji Tata Trust sanctioned funds for installing a cyclotron at the University of Calcutta, but various difficulties likely related to the war delayed the project. In 1944, Homi J. Bhabha, a distinguished nuclear physicist who had established a research school at the Indian Institute of Science, Bangalore, wrote a letter to his distant cousin J. R. D. Tata, the chairman of the Tata Group. He requested funds to establish a research institute of fundamental physics, "with special reference to cosmic rays and nuclear physics." The Tata Institute of Fundamental Research (TIFR) was inaugurated in Mumbai the following year.

=== Establishment of atomic energy in India ===
Following the atomic bombing of Hiroshima in August 1945, R. S. Krishnan, a nuclear physicist who had studied under Norman Feather and John Cockcroft, and who recognised the massive energy-generating potential of uranium, observed, "If the tremendous energy released from atomic explosions is made available to drive machinery, etc., it will bring about an industrial revolution of a far-reaching character." He further noted, however, the difficulties in harnessing nuclear power for peaceful usage, "...a great deal more research work is needed before atomic power can be put to industrial use."

In March 1946, the Board of Scientific and Industrial Research (BSIR), under the Council of Scientific and Industrial Research (CSIR), set up an Atomic Research Committee under Bhabha's leadership to explore India's atomic energy resources and to suggest ways to develop and harness them, along with establishing contacts with similar organisations in other nations. At the same time, the University of Travancore's research council met to discuss Travancore's future industrial development. Among other matters, the council made recommendations for developing the state's resources of monazite, a valuable thorium ore, and ilmenite, with regard to their applications in atomic energy. The council suggested the project could be undertaken by an all-India programme. This was followed by the deputation of Bhabha and Sir Shanti Swarup Bhatnagar, the Director of the CSIR, to Travancore in April 1947 and the establishment of a working relationship with the kingdom's dewan, Sir C. P. Ramaswami Iyer.

Early in 1947, plans were made to establish a Uranium Unit under the Geological Survey of India, to focus on identifying and developing resources of uranium-bearing minerals. In June 1947, two months before Indian independence, Chakravarti Rajagopalachari, then Minister for Industry, Supply, Education and Finance in the Interim Government of India, established an advisory board for research in atomic energy. Chaired by Bhabha and placed under the CSIR, the advisory board included Saha, Bhatnagar and several other distinguished scientists, notably Sir K. S. Krishnan, the co-discoverer of the Raman effect, geologist Darashaw Nosherwan Wadia and Nazir Ahmed, a student of Ernest Rutherford. A Joint Committee comprising the above scientists and three representatives of the Travancore government was set up to determine how best to utilise Travancore's resources of monazite. Following the independence and partition of India, Travancore briefly declared itself independent before acceding to the new Dominion of India in 1949 after a period of intense negotiations, while Ahmad departed for Pakistan, where he would eventually head that nation's atomic energy agency.

On 23 March 1948, Prime Minister Jawaharlal Nehru introduced the Atomic Energy Bill in the Indian Parliament, and it was subsequently passed as the Indian Atomic Energy Act. Modelled on the British Atomic Energy Act 1946, the Act granted sweeping powers to the central government over nuclear science and research, including surveying for atomic minerals, the development of such mineral resources on an industrial scale, conducting research regarding the scientific and technical problems connected with developing atomic energy for peaceful purposes, the training and education of the necessary personnel and the fostering of fundamental research in the nuclear sciences in Indian laboratories, institutes and universities. Around the same time, the Government of West Bengal sanctioned the construction of a nuclear physics institute under the University of Calcutta; the cornerstone was laid in May 1948, and the institute was inaugurated on 11 January 1950 by Irène Joliot-Curie.

With effect from 1 June 1948, the advisory board for Research in Atomic Energy, together with its parent organisation the CSIR, was folded into the new Department of Scientific Research and placed directly under the Prime Minister. On 3 August 1948, the Atomic Energy Commission of India (AEC) was established and made separate from the Department of Scientific Research, with Bhabha as its first chairman. In January 1949, the AEC met to formulate a uniform under- and post-graduate university syllabus for theoretical and fundamental physics and chemistry, to guarantee sufficient numbers of nuclear scientists and to ensure they would receive consistent levels of training and education. In the same year, the Tata Institute of Fundamental Research was designated by the CSIR as the hub for all major nuclear science research projects. In 1950, the government announced it would purchase all available stocks of uranium and beryllium minerals and ores, and declared large rewards for any significant discoveries of the same. On 3 January 1954, the Atomic Energy Establishment, Trombay (AEET) was established by the Atomic Energy Commission to consolidate all nuclear reactor research and technology-related developments; on 3 August, the Atomic Energy Commission and all its subordinate agencies, including the Tata Institute of Fundamental Research and the nuclear research institute at Calcutta University, were transferred to the new Department of Atomic Energy and placed under the direct charge of the Prime Minister's Office. In May 1956, construction on a uranium metal plant and a fuel element fabrication facility for the research reactors began at Trombay; the uranium plant came into operation in January 1959, followed by the fuel element facility in February 1960. The AEET (renamed the Bhabha Atomic Research Centre in 1967, after Bhabha's death) was formally inaugurated by Nehru in January 1957. With the expanding scope of Indian nuclear research, the 1948 Atomic Energy Act was amended in 1961, and was passed as the new Atomic Energy Act, coming into force in September 1962.

=== Early research reactors ===
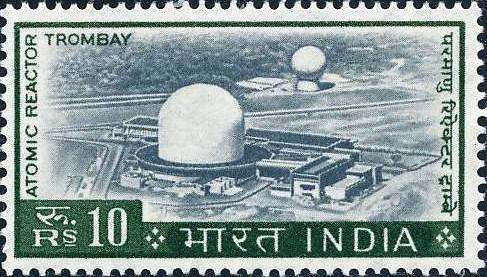
Indian stamp shows Apsara, India's and Asia's first nuclear reactor, at Trombay

At a meeting of the Atomic Energy Commission on 15 March 1955, the decision was made to construct a small nuclear reactor at Trombay. The reactor would be used for training personnel for the operation of future reactors and for research, including experiments in nuclear physics, studying the effects of irradiation and the production of isotopes for medical, agricultural and industrial research. In October 1955, an agreement was signed by the United Kingdom Atomic Energy Authority and the Indian Department of Atomic Energy, under which Britain would supply uranium fuel elements for a swimming pool reactor to be designed by India. The agreement further ensured the "close cooperation and mutual assistance between the Department and the Authority in the promotion and development of the peaceful uses of atomic energy," and provided for future design and collaboration in the construction of a high flux reactor at a later date. Named Apsara, the reactor was housed in a 100 x 50 x 70 concrete building. India's and Asia's first nuclear reactor, Apsara, reached criticality at 3:45 p.m. on 4 August 1956 and was inaugurated by Prime Minister Nehru on 20 January 1957.

In April 1955, the Canadian government under Prime Minister Louis St. Laurent offered to assist in building an NRX-type reactor for India under the Colombo Plan, of which both India and Canada were then members. Prime Minister St. Laurent expressed hopes the reactor would serve India well in the development of peaceful atomic research and development. On behalf of the Indian government, Nehru formally accepted the offer that September, stating the reactor would be made available to any accredited foreign scientists, including those from other Colombo Plan member states. On 28 April 1956, Nehru and the Canadian High Commissioner to India Escott Reid signed an agreement for a "Canada-India Colombo Plan Atomic Reactor Project." Under the terms of the agreement, Canada would provide a 40 MW CIRUS reactor for solely research purposes, including the initial manufacture and engineering of the reactor, and would also provide technical expertise, including training Indian personnel in its operation. India would supply the reactor site and foundation, and would also pay all "internal" costs, including the construction of the reactor complex, the costs of local labour and any shipping and insurance fees. Under Article II of the agreement, India would make the reactor facilities available to other Colombo Plan nations. Article III stipulated that the "reactor and any products resulting from its use will be employed for peaceful purposes only;" at the time, however, there were no effective safeguards to ensure this clause. A further agreement was made with the United States government to supply 21 tons of heavy water for the reactor. Construction of the reactor began later in 1956, with Indian technical personnel sent to Chalk River for training. CIRUS was completed in early 1960 and after achieving criticality in July 1960, was inaugurated by Nehru in January 1961. Construction of a third research reactor, ZERLINA (Zero Energy Reactor for Lattice Investigations and New Assemblies) began at Trombay in 1958; ZERLINA was also commissioned in 1961.

=== Beginnings of commercial nuclear power ===
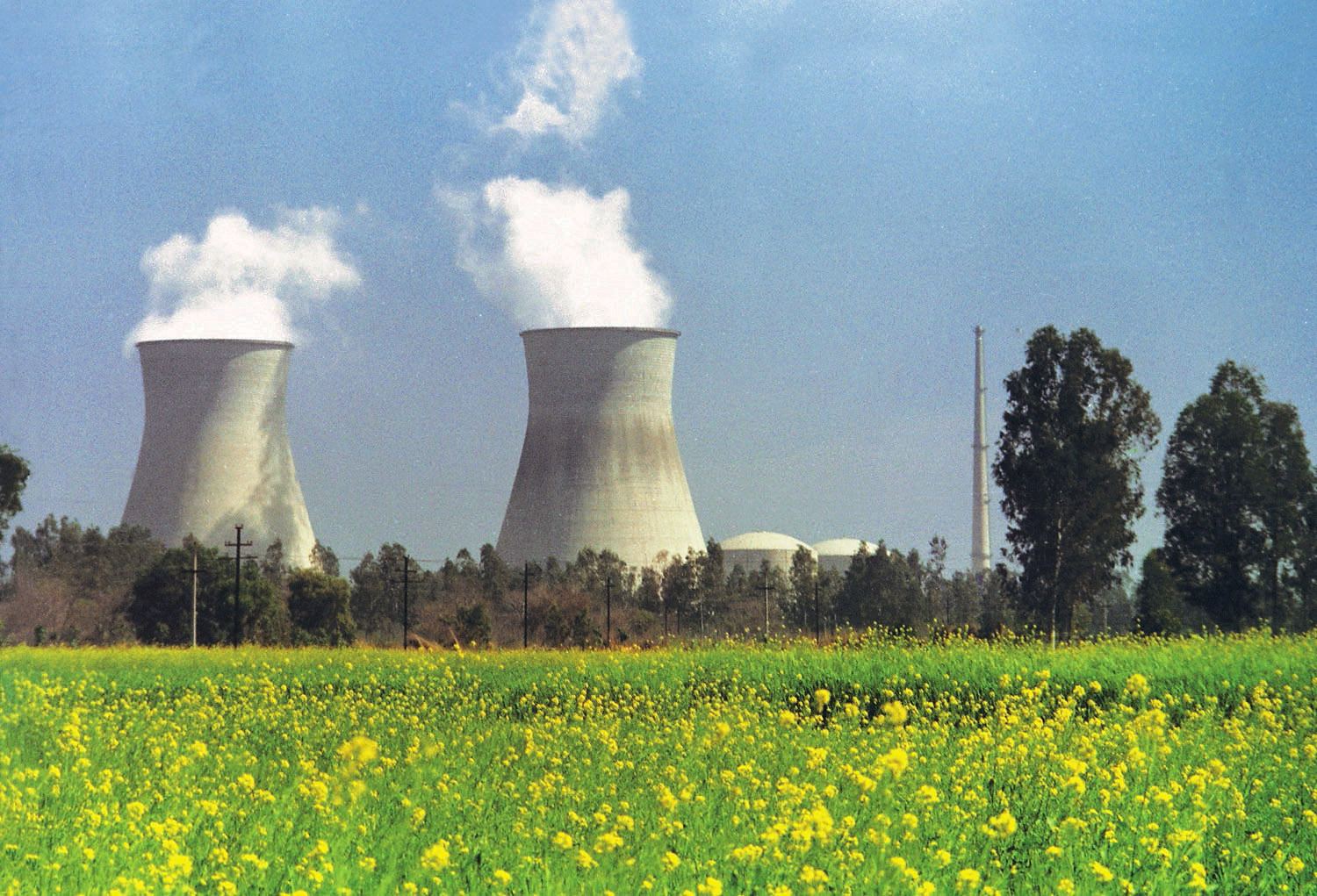
Cooling towers of Narora Atomic Power Station in the state of Uttar Pradesh, India

In September 1955, the question of building a commercial nuclear power station was raised in Parliament. Shortly after the world's first commercial nuclear power plant came online at Obninsk in the Soviet Union, the Soviets invited a number of Indian experts to visit it; the United States concurrently offered training in atomic energy to Indian technical and scientific personnel. In August 1957, members of the Gujarat Chamber of Commerce in Ahmedabad (then in Bombay State) requested an atomic power station for their city, by which time the Indian government was actively considering the construction of at least "one or more large Atomic Power Stations to generate electricity." By November 1958, the Atomic Energy Commission had recommended construction of two nuclear power stations, each consisting of two units and able to generate 500 MW of power, for a total generating capacity of 1000 MW; the government decided that a minimum of 250 MW of electricity generated from nuclear reactors would be incorporated into the Third Five Year Plan (1961–1966).

In February 1960, it was decided the first power plant would be erected in Western India, with locations in Rajasthan, near Delhi and near Madras noted for future commercial reactors. In September, the Punjab government requested a nuclear power station for their state. On 11 October 1960, the Indian government issued a tender for India's first nuclear power station near Tarapur, Maharashtra and consisting of two reactors, each generating around 150 MW of electricity and to be commissioned in 1965. In August 1961, the Indian and Canadian governments agreed to conduct a joint study on building a Canada-India nuclear power plant in Rajasthan; the reactor would be based on the CANDU reactor at Douglas Point and would generate 200 MW. By this time, seven responses to India's global tender for the Tarapur power station had been received: three from the United States, two from the UK and one each from France and Canada.

The agreement for India's first nuclear power plant at Rajasthan, RAPP-1, was signed in 1963, followed by RAPP-2 in 1966. These reactors contained rigid safeguards to ensure they would not be used for a military programme. RAPP-1 began operation in 1972. Due to technical problems, the reactor had to be downrated from 200 MW to 100 MW. The technical and design information were given free of charge by Atomic Energy of Canada Limited to India. Canada terminated its assistance after Smiling Buddha, the detonation of India's first nuclear explosion in 1974. The United States had mixed reactions, and stopped the supply of fuel to the Tarapur power station, however, after considering contractural obligations, continued the supply of fuel until 1993.

=== Modern nuclear power plants ===
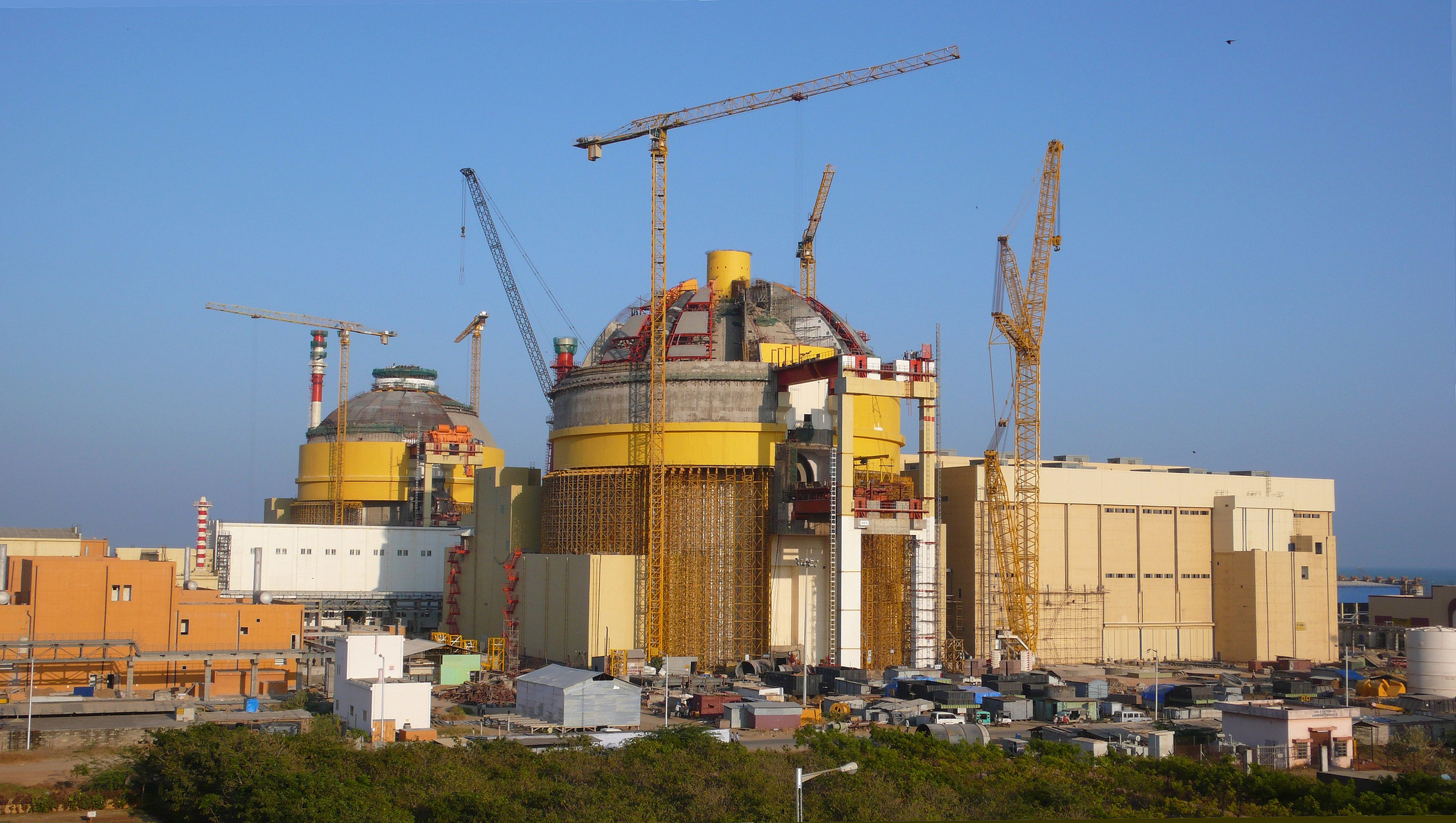
Kudankulam power plant first two reactors while still under construction in 2009.

An intergovernmental agreement (IGA) on the project was signed on 20 November 1988 by the Prime Minister of India, Rajiv Gandhi and the Soviet head of state, Mikhail Gorbachev, for the construction of two reactors. The project remained in limbo for a decade due to the dissolution of the Soviet Union but the first unit was finally commission on 22 October 2013, followed by the second on 15 October 2016. In June 2014, Kudankulam-1 became the single largest power-generating unit in India (1000 MWe). After the successful commissioning of Kudankulam units 1 & 2, an agreement was made with Russia in June 2017 for units 5 & 6 (2 x 1000 MW) with an estimated cost of INR 250 million (3.85 million US$) per MW. Earlier, India had also entered into an agreement with Russia in October 2016 for units 3 & 4 (2 x 1000 MW) with an estimated cost of INR 200 million (3.08 million US$) per MW.

=== Recent developments ===
The share of nuclear power generated in India is expected to rise with the commissioning of multiple IPHWR-700 and VVER-1000 reactors.

India has commissioned 3 indigenous reactors of the IPHWR-700 design, 2 at Kakrapar and one at the Rajasthan site. In January 2021, India's atomic energy secretary K.N. Vyas announced that the 700-megawatt pressurised heavy water reactor at the Kakrapar Atomic Power Station would be the first of the 16 such units planned in the country. In 2022, construction began on two IPHWR -700 reactors at the Gorakhpur Haryana site. On 25 September 2025, Prime Minister Narendra Modi laid the foundation stone of the Mahi Banswara Atomic Power Plant, which will house 4 IPHWR units and is a part of India's fleet mode initiative. India commissioned a 700 MW reactor at Rajasthan Unit 7 in April 2025, with Unit 8 expected to come online in 2026.

NPCIL is carrying out life extension work at various sites. The reactors 1 & 2 of the Tarapur Atomic Power Station are being refurbished for a 10-year extension after being shut down following an explosion while maintenance, damaging the chimney, and the discovery of cracks in the recirculation system of the BWR reactors. The system has been replaced at unit 1 undergoing series of upgrades in safety, replaced piping of the primary recirculation system of the BWR reactor. It attained criticality on 30 December 2025, and was briefly connected to the grid on 29 January 2026 before being disconnected again. Unit 1 was finally synchronized with the national grid in February 2026, and is operating at its rated power. The Unit 2 is also undergoing similar work, and is expected to come online soon in 2026.

The retubing of the IPHWR reactors at Kaiga, and Madras sites is underway, as of March 2026.

== Nuclear fuel reserves ==
India's domestic uranium reserves are small and the country is dependent on uranium imports to fuel its nuclear power industry. Since the early 1990s, Russia has been a major supplier of nuclear fuel to India. Due to dwindling domestic uranium reserves, electricity generation from nuclear power in India declined by 12.83% from 2006 to 2008. Following a waiver from the Nuclear Suppliers Group (NSG) in September 2008 which allowed it to commence international nuclear trade, India has signed bilateral deals on civilian nuclear energy technology cooperation with several other countries, including France, the United States, the United Kingdom, Canada, and South Korea. India has also uranium supply agreements with Russia, Mongolia, Kazakhstan, Argentina and Namibia. An Indian private company won a uranium exploration contract in Niger. Kazakhstan is the largest supplier of uranium to India providing 5,000 tonnes during 2015–19.

In March 2011, large deposits of uranium were discovered in the Tummalapalle belt in Andhra Pradesh and in the Bhima basin in Karnataka by the Atomic Minerals Directorate for Exploration and Research (AMD) of India. The Tummalapalle belt uranium reserves promise to be one of the world's top 20 uranium reserves. 44,000 tonnes of natural uranium have been discovered in the belt so far, which is estimated to have three times that amount. The natural uranium deposits of the Bhima basin has better grade of natural uranium ore, even though it is smaller than the Tummalapalle belt. Over 14000 tonnes of uranium ore deposits are found in Rajasthan—Rohil, Sikar District.

In recent years, India has shown increased interest in thorium fuels and fuel cycles because of large deposits of thorium (518,000 tonnes) in the form of monazite in beach sands as compared to very modest reserves of low-grade uranium (92,000 tonnes).

Uranium used for the weapons programme has been separated from the power programme, using uranium from indigenous reserves. This domestic reserve of 80,000 to 112,000 tons of uranium (approx 1% of global uranium reserves) is large enough to supply all of India's commercial and military reactors as well as supply all the needs of India's nuclear weapons arsenal. Currently, India's nuclear power reactors consume, at most, 478 tonnes of uranium per year. Even if India were to quadruple its nuclear power output (and reactor base) to 20 GW by 2020, nuclear power generation would only consume 2000 tonnes of uranium per annum. Based on India's known commercially viable reserves of 80,000 to 112,000 tons of uranium, this represents a 40–50 year uranium supply for India's nuclear power reactors (note with reprocessing and breeder reactor technology, this supply could be stretched out many times over). Furthermore, the uranium requirements of India's Nuclear Arsenal are only one-fifteenth (1/15) of that required for power generation (approx. 32 tonnes), meaning that India's domestic fissile material supply is more than enough to meet all needs for its strategic nuclear arsenal. Therefore, India has sufficient uranium resources to meet its strategic and power requirements for the foreseeable future.

== Nuclear agreements with other nations ==
As of 2016, India has signed civil nuclear agreements with 14 countries: Argentina, Australia, Canada, the Czech Republic, France, Japan, Kazakhstan, Mongolia, Namibia, Russia, South Korea, the United Kingdom, the United States, and Vietnam. The 48-nation NSG granted a waiver to India on 6 September 2008, allowing it to access civilian nuclear technology and fuel from other countries. India is the only country with known nuclear weapons which is not a party to the Non-Proliferation Treaty (NPT) but is still allowed to carry out nuclear commerce with the rest of the world.

India and Mongolia signed a crucial civil nuclear agreement on 15 June 2009 for the supply of Uranium to India, during Prime Minister Manmohan Singh's visit to Mongolia, making it the fifth nation in the world to seal a civil nuclear pact with India. The MoU on "development of cooperation in the field of peaceful uses of radioactive minerals and nuclear energy" was signed by senior officials in the department of atomic energy of the two countries.

On 2 September 2009, India and Namibia signed five agreements, including one on civil nuclear energy which allows for the supply of uranium from the African country. This was signed during President Hifikepunye Pohamba's five-day visit to India in May 2009. Namibia is the fifth-largest producer of uranium in the world. The Indo-Namibian agreement on peaceful uses of nuclear energy allows for the supply of uranium and the setting up of nuclear reactors. On 14 October 2009, India and Argentina signed an agreement in New Delhi on civil nuclear cooperation and nine other pacts to establish a strategic partnership. According to official sources, the agreement was signed by Vivek Katju, Secretary in the Ministry of External Affairs and Argentine foreign minister Jorge Talana. Taking into consideration their respective capabilities and experience in the peaceful uses of nuclear energy, both India and Argentina have agreed to encourage and support scientific, technical and commercial cooperation for mutual benefit in this field.

Risks related to nuclear power generation prompted Indian legislators to enact the 2010 Nuclear Liability Act which stipulates that nuclear suppliers, contractors and operators must bear financial responsibility in case of an accident. The legislation addresses key issues such as nuclear radiation and safety regulations, operational control and maintenance management of nuclear power plants, compensation in the event of a radiation-leak accident, disaster clean-up costs, operator responsibility and supplier liability. This was meant to be one of the last steps needed to activate the Indo-U.S. civilian nuclear agreement, but as of 2026, it has not yet satisfied the liability insurance requirements of U.S. nuclear reactor design and construction companies although it expects to solve this issue through SHANTI act.

The Prime Ministers of India and Canada signed a civil nuclear cooperation agreement in Toronto on 28 June 2010 which when all steps are taken, will provide access for Canada's nuclear industry to India's expanding nuclear market and also fuel for India's reactors. Canada is one of the world's largest exporters of uranium and Canada's heavy water nuclear technology is marketed abroad with CANDU-type units operating in India, Pakistan, Argentina, South Korea, Romania and China. On 6 November 2012, India and Canada finalised their 2010 nuclear export agreement, opening the way for Canada to begin uranium exports to India.

On 16 April 2011, India and Kazakhstan signed an inter-governmental agreement for Cooperation in Peaceful Uses of Atomic Energy, which envisages a legal framework for the supply of fuel, construction and operation of atomic power plants, exploration and joint mining of uranium, exchange of scientific and research information, reactor safety mechanisms and use of radiation technologies for healthcare. PM Manmohan Singh visited Astana where a deal was signed. After the talks, the Kazakh President Nazarbaev announced that his country would supply India with 2100 tonnes of uranium and was ready to do more. Kazakhstan is the largest producer of uranium in the world. India and Kazakhstan have had civil nuclear cooperation since January 2009 when the Nuclear Power Corporation of India Limited (NPCIL) and Kazakh nuclear company KazAtomProm signed an MoU during the visit of Nazarbaev to Delhi. Under the contract, KazAtomProm supplies uranium which is used by Indian reactors.

South Korea became the latest country to sign a nuclear agreement with India after it got the waiver from the Nuclear Suppliers' Group (NSG) in 2008. On 25 July 2011, India and South Korea signed a nuclear agreement, which would allow South Korea a legal foundation to participate in India's nuclear expansion programme, and to bid for constructing nuclear power plants in India.

In 2014, India and Australia signed a civil nuclear agreement which allows the export of uranium to India. This was signed in New Delhi during Australian Prime Minister Tony Abbott's meeting with the Indian Prime Minister Narendra Modi on 4 September 2014. Australia is the third-largest producer of uranium in the world. The agreement allows the supply of uranium for the peaceful generation of power for civil use in India.

India's Prime Minister Narendra Modi and UK Prime Minister David Cameron signed Civil Nuclear Agreement on 12 November 2015.

=== Reactor agreements ===
After the Nuclear Suppliers Group agreed to allow nuclear exports to India, France was the first country to sign a civilian nuclear agreement with India, on 30 September 2008. During the December 2010 visit of the French President Nicolas Sarkozy to India, framework agreements were signed for the setting up of two third-generation EPR reactors of 1650 MW each at Jaitapur, Maharashtra by the French company Areva. The deal covers the first set of two of the six planned reactors and the supply of nuclear fuel for 25 years. Construction has faced regulatory issues and difficulty in sourcing major components from Japan due to India not being a signatory to the Nuclear Non-Proliferation Treaty.

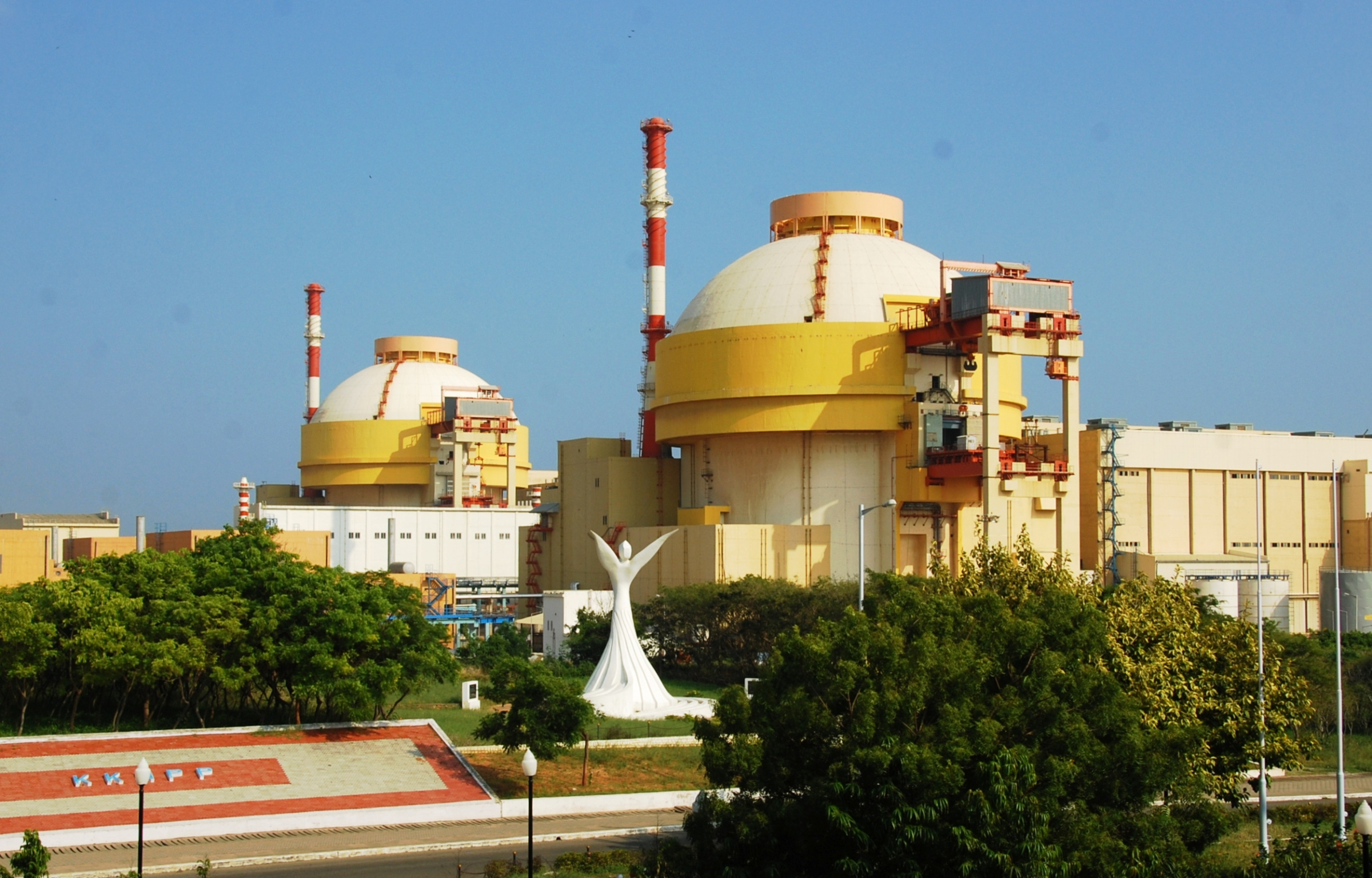
Units 1 and 2 of the Kudankulam Nuclear Power Plant in Tamil Nadu, India

In April 2021, French group EDF made a binding offer to build six third-generation EPR nuclear reactors at the Jaitapur site, with an installed capacity of 9.6 gigawatts.

In November 2016, Japan signed a nuclear cooperation agreement with India. Japanese nuclear plant builders saw this as a potential lifeline, given that domestic orders had ended following the Fukushima Daiichi nuclear disaster, and India is proposing to build about 20 new reactors over the next decade.

Russia has an ongoing agreement of 1988 vintage with India regarding the establishment of two VVER 1000 MW reactors (water-cooled water-moderated light water power reactors) at Koodankulam in Tamil Nadu. A 2008 agreement caters to the provision of an additional four third-generation VVER-1200 reactors of capacity 1170 MW each. Russia has assisted in India's efforts to design a nuclear plant for its nuclear submarine. In 2009, Russia stated that it would not agree to curbs on the export of sensitive technology to India. A new accord signed in December 2009 with Russia gives India freedom to proceed with the closed fuel cycle, which includes mining, preparation of the fuel for use in reactors, and reprocessing of spent fuel.

In October 2018, India and Russia signed an agreement to construct 6 nuclear reactors. Russian state-owned reactor manufacturer Rosatom stated that it would offer its third-generation VVER reactors. The agreement is not a firm contract, but rather an agreement to work toward a firm contract.

The nuclear agreement with the United States led to India issuing a Letter of Intent for purchasing 10,000 MW from the US. However, liability concerns and a few other issues are preventing further progress on the issue. Experts say that India's nuclear liability law discourages foreign nuclear companies. This law gives accident victims the right to seek damages from plant suppliers in the event of a mishap. It has "deterred foreign players like General Electric and Westinghouse Electric, a US-based unit of Toshiba, with companies asking for further clarification on compensation liability for private operators." On 5 October 2018, India and Russia signed an agreement to construct 6 Russian nuclear reactors in India.

The PHWR fleet of India, in analysis by M.V. Ramana, was constructed, fuelled and continues to operate, close to the price of Indian coal power stations.

== Nuclear power plans ==
Nuclear power percentage in the world

India has already been using imported enriched uranium for light-water reactors that are currently under IAEA safeguards, but it has developed other aspects of the nuclear fuel cycle to support its reactors. India has vast thorium reserves but limited uranium reserves which has increased import dependence. Uranium import has historically been a constraint in India's nuclear energy ambitions, due to which India considers energy independence as a high priority which is also reflected in the development of technologies. Heavy water reactors such as IPHWR class reactors developed by BARC, have been particularly attractive for the nation because it allows Uranium to be burnt with little to no enrichment capabilities. Thorium based reactors are of particularly high interest for the nation due to high amount of thorium reserves in India as well as its ability to provide hundreds of times the energy with the same mass of fuel and its theoretical potential to be utilized in heavy water reactors which has tied the development of the two. India's fast breeder reactor program is also a crucial part of the nation's strategy to expand its nuclear energy capabilities and ensure energy security, as it allows the country to utilize its vast reserves of thorium as well as uranium in producing more fissile material, significantly extending the life of nuclear fuel resources.

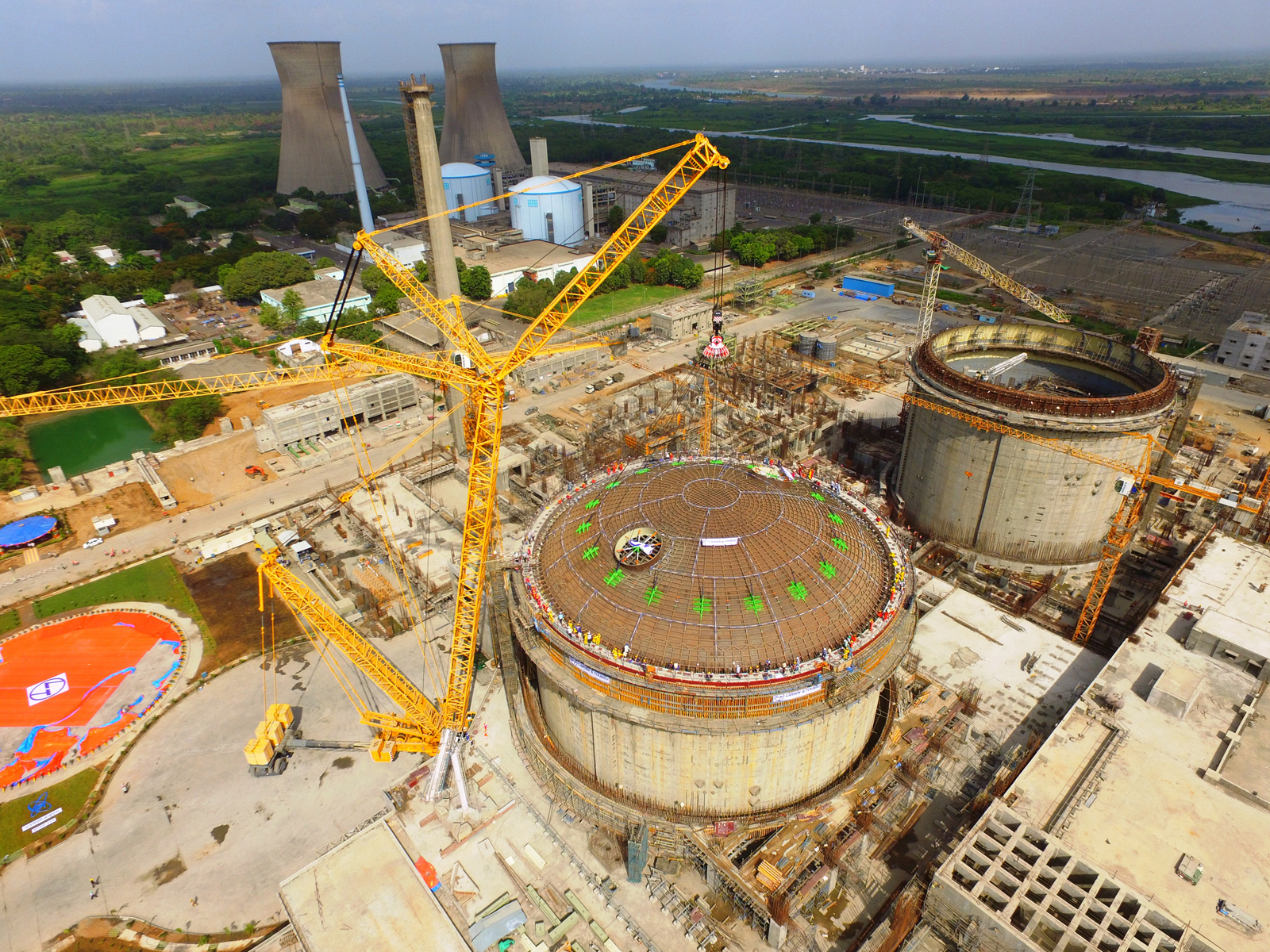
Two IPHWR-700 reactors under construction at the Kakrapar Atomic Power Station in Gujarat

The long-term goal of India's nuclear program has been to develop an advanced heavy-water thorium cycle as outlined in India's three-stage nuclear power programme.

- The first stage of this employs the pressurised heavy water reactors (PHWR) fuelled by natural uranium, and light water reactors, which produce plutonium incidentally to their prime purpose of electricity generation.
- The second stage uses fast neutron reactors burning the plutonium with the blanket around the core having uranium as well as thorium, so that further plutonium (ideally high-fissile Pu) is produced as well as U-233. The Atomic Minerals Directorate (AMD) has identified almost 12 million tonnes of monazite resources (typically with 6-7% thorium).
- In stage 3, Advanced Heavy Water Reactors (AHWR) would burn thorium-plutonium fuels in such a manner that breeds U-233 which can eventually be used as a self-sustaining fissile driver for a fleet of breeding AHWRs. An alternative stage 3 is molten salt breeder reactors (MSBR), which are believed to be another possible option for eventual large-scale deployment.

=== Fast breeder reactors ===
The centerpiece of this program is the Prototype Fast Breeder Reactor (PFBR) commissioned at Kalpakkam, Tamil Nadu by BHAVINI which achieved first criticality on 6 April 2026. Developed by the Indira Gandhi Centre for Atomic Research (IGCAR), the PFBR is a 500 MW sodium-cooled fast reactor designed to generate more fissile material than it consumes. It aims to produce plutonium-239 from uranium-238 using mixed oxide (MOX) fuel, which is a blend of plutonium-239 and uranium-238. It is also capable of irradiating a thorium blanket to produce uranium-233 for use in future reactors.

=== Small modular reactors ===
The Government of India, announced in the Union Budget FY26, under the Nuclear Power Mission that it allocated a fund of ₹20,000 crores, for the development of Small modular reactors (SMRs), with the aim of making at least five indigenously developed SMRs, which shall also be known as Bharat Small Reactors (BSRs) operational by 2033. Work is underway at the Bhabha Atomic Research Centre for the 200 MW Bharat Small Modular Reactor (BSMR-200) 55MWe SMR, 55 MWe Small Modular Reactor (SMR-55), and up to 5MWth high temperature gas cooled reactor for hydrogen generation.

=== Legislation ===
The Union Budget 2025-26 proposed to amend the Atomic Energy Act and the Civil Liability for Nuclear Damage Act to realize a goal of at least 100 GW of nuclear energy by 2047 which is 10 times more than the nuclear installed capacity at the time. In the 2025 winter session of the Indian parliament, the Sustainable Harnessing and Advancement of Nuclear Energy for Transforming India (SHANTI) Bill, 2025 was passed in the Lok Sabha and Rajya Sabha, and subsequently sanctioned by the President of India. The act enables limited private participation under regulatory oversight.

== List of nuclear power plants ==
Plant name	Unit No.	Type	Model	Status	Capacity (MW)	Begin building	Commercial operation	Closed
Chutka	1	PHWR	IPHWR-700	Planned	630			
Chutka	2	PHWR	IPHWR-700	Planned	630			
Gorakhpur	1	PHWR	IPHWR-700	Under Construction	630	2022		
Gorakhpur	2	PHWR	IPHWR-700	Under Construction	630	2022		
Gorakhpur	3	PHWR	IPHWR-700	Planned	630			
Gorakhpur	4	PHWR	IPHWR-700	Planned	630			
Kaiga	1	PHWR	IPHWR-220	Operation suspended (Under maintenance)	202	1 Sep 1989	16 Nov 2000	
Kaiga	2	PHWR	IPHWR-220	Operational	202	1 Dec 1989	16 Mar 2000	
Kaiga	3	PHWR	IPHWR-220	Operational	202	30 Mar 2002	6 May 2007	
Kaiga	4	PHWR	IPHWR-220	Operational	202	10 May 2002	20 Jan 2011	
Kaiga	5	PHWR	IPHWR-700	Under construction	630	1 Mar 2026		
Kaiga	6	PHWR	IPHWR-700	Under construction	630	1 Mar 2026		
Kakrapar	1	PHWR	IPHWR-220	Operational	202	1 Dec 1984	6 May 1993	
Kakrapar	2	PHWR	IPHWR-220	Operational	202	1 Apr 1985	1 Sep 1995	
Kakrapar	3	PHWR	IPHWR-700	Operational	630	22 Nov 2010	30 Jun 2023	
Kakrapar	4	PHWR	IPHWR-700	Operational	630	22 Nov 2010	31 Mar 2024	
Kudankulam	1	PWR	VVER-1000/V-412	Operational	932	31 Mar 2002	31 Dec 2014	
Kudankulam	2	PWR	VVER-1000/V-412	Operational	932	4 Jul 2002	31 Mar 2017	
Kudankulam	3	PWR	VVER-1000/V-412	Under construction	917	30 Jun 2017	(2026)	
Kudankulam	4	PWR	VVER-1000/V-412	Under construction	917	23 Oct 2017	(2027)	
Kudankulam	5	PWR	VVER-1000/V-412	Under construction	917	29 Jun 2021	(2029)	
Kudankulam	6	PWR	VVER-1000/V-412	Under construction	917	20 Dec 2021	(2030)	
Madras	1	PHWR	IPHWR-220	Operation suspended (under maintenance)	205	1 Jan 1971	27 Jan 1984	
Madras	2	PHWR	IPHWR-220	Operational	205	1 Oct 1972	21 Mar 1986	
Madras	3	SFR	PFBR	Operational	490	23 Oct 2004	6 April 2026	
Mahi Banswara	1	PHWR	IPHWR-700	Planned	630		(2031)	
Mahi Banswara	2	PHWR	IPHWR-700	Planned	630		(2032)	
Mahi Banswara	3	PHWR	IPHWR-700	Planned	630		(2033)	
Mahi Banswara	4	PHWR	IPHWR-700	Planned	630		(2034)	
Narora	1	PHWR	IPHWR-220	Operational	202	1 Dec 1976	1 Jan 1991	
Narora	2	PHWR	IPHWR-220	Operational	202	1 Nov 1977	1 Jul 1992	
Rajasthan	1	PHWR	CANDU	Shut down	90	1 Aug 1965	16 Dec 1973	9 Oct 2004
Rajasthan	2	PHWR	CANDU	Operational	187	1 Apr 1968	1 Apr 1981	
Rajasthan	3	PHWR	IPHWR-220	Operational	202	1 Feb 1990	1 Jun 2000	
Rajasthan	4	PHWR	IPHWR-220	Operational	202	1 Oct 1990	23 Dec 2000	
Rajasthan	5	PHWR	IPHWR-220	Operational	202	18 Sep 2002	4 Feb 2010	
Rajasthan	6	PHWR	IPHWR-220	Operational	202	20 Jan 2003	31 Mar 2010	
Rajasthan	7	PHWR	IPHWR-700	Operational	630	18 Jul 2011	15 Apr 2025	
Rajasthan	8	PHWR	IPHWR-700	Under construction	630	30 Sep 2011	(2026)	
Tarapur	1	BWR	BWR-1 (Mark 2)	Operational	150	1 Oct 1964	28 Oct 1969	
Tarapur	2	BWR	BWR-1 (Mark 2)	Operational	150	1 Oct 1964	28 Oct 1969	
Tarapur	3	PHWR	IPHWR-540	Operational	490	12 May 2000	18 Aug 2006	
Tarapur	4	PHWR	IPHWR-540	Operational	490	8 Mar 2000	12 Sep 2005	

== Anti-nuclear protests ==
India's nuclear power generation efforts are subject to many safeguards and oversight. Its environmental management system is ISO 14001 certified, and it undergoes peer review by the World Association of Nuclear Operators, including a pre-start-up peer review. Despite India being among countries with the highest public acceptance of nuclear energy, the country still faces anti-nuclear protests.

Following the March 2011 Fukushima nuclear disaster in Japan, populations around Kudankulam launched a large scale anti-nuclear protest against the Russian-backed 2,000 MW Kudankulam Nuclear Power Plant in Tamil Nadu. The incident resulted in police and paramilitary firing tear gas into a crowd of 600-700 resulting in two deaths, and registration of sedition charges against 8,856 protestors over the course of 2011-2013. Beside Kudankulam, there have been mass protests against the French-backed 9,900 MW Jaitapur Nuclear Power Project in Maharashtra and Gorakhpur Nuclear Power Plant in Haryana, although these were weakened as people accepted compensation. After facing stiff resistance from locals, a proposed 6,000 MW facility near the town of Haripur, West Bengal intended to host six Russian reactors was shifted to Kavali in Andhra Pradesh. Similarly, the Nuclear Power Plant planned for Kovvada, Srikakulam in Andhra Pradesh was shifted from Mithi Virdi in Gujarat after the locals also showed resistance.

== See also ==
- Economics of nuclear power plants
- Energy policy of India
- Electricity sector in India
- Energy in India
- India's three-stage nuclear power programme
- List of commercial nuclear reactors
