= Rajasthan Atomic Power Station =

Indian Nuclear power plant

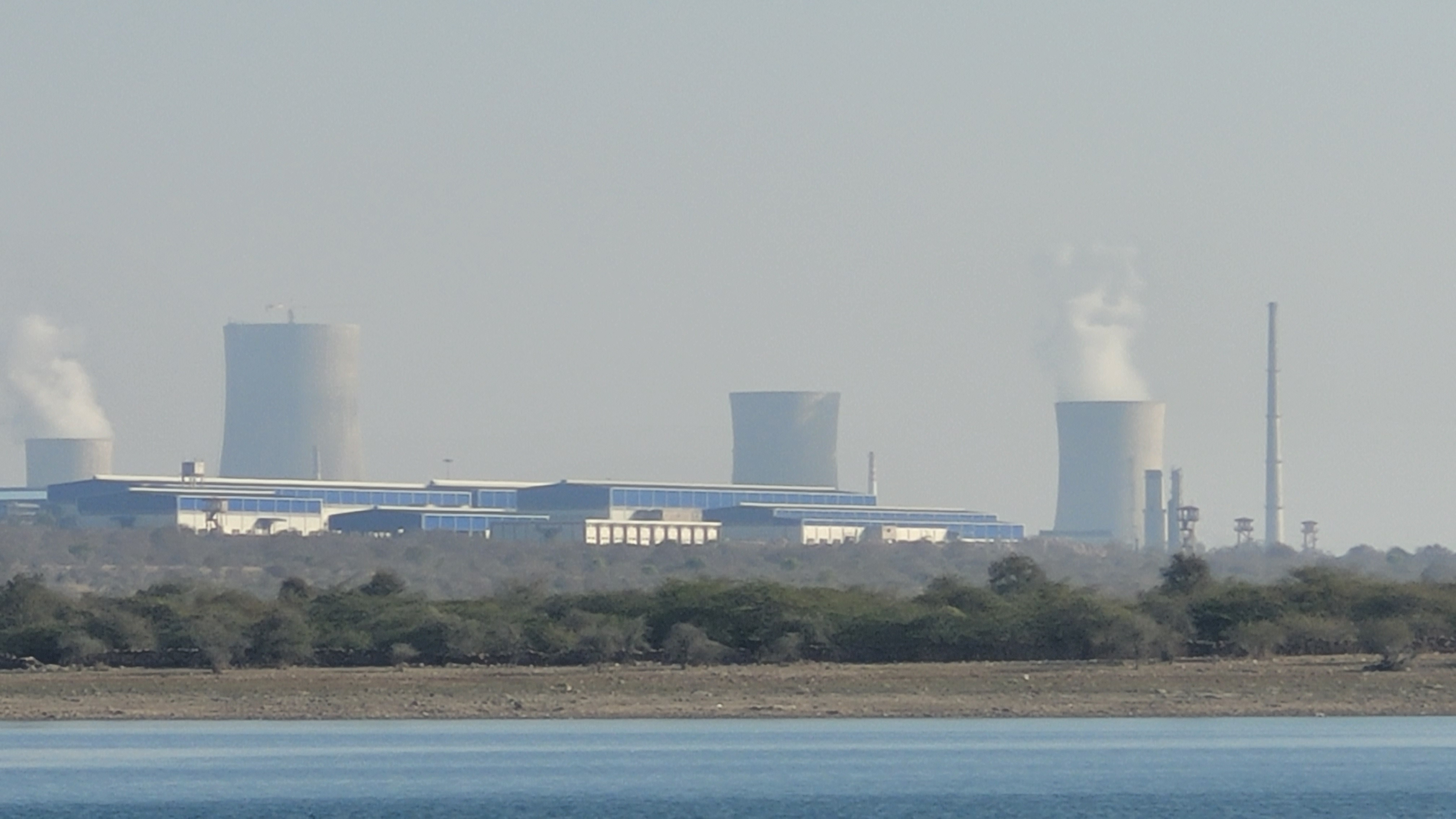
- Country: India
- Coordinates: 24°52′20″N 75°36′50″E
- Status: Operational
- Construction began: 1963
- Commission date: 16 December 1973
- Operator: Nuclear Power Corporation of India Ltd (NPCIL)

Nuclear power station
- Reactors: 8
- Reactor type: PHWR
- Reactor supplier: Units 1 & 2: AECL; Units 3 to 8: NPCIL
- Cooling towers: 8 × Natural Draft
- Cooling source: Rana Pratap Sagar Dam, Chambal River

Power generation
- Units operational: 1 × 200 MW; 4 × 220 MW; 1 × 700 MW
- Make and model: Units 1 & 2: CANDU; Units 3 to 6: IPHWR-220; Units 7 & 8: IPHWR-700
- Units under const.: 1 × 700 MW
- Units decommissioned: 1 × 100 MW
- Nameplate capacity: 1780 MW
- Capacity factor: 78.07% (2020-21), Unit 1:17%, Unit 2:57 %, Unit 3 to 6:77 % approx
- Annual net output: 6810.61 GWh (2023-24)(units 1 to 6)

External links
- Website: Nuclear power Corporation of India Ltd
- Commons: Related media on Commons

The Rajasthan Atomic Power Station (RAPS; also, Rajasthan Atomic Power Project - RAPP) is a nuclear power plant located at Rawatbhata in the state of Rajasthan, India. It is the third largest nuclear power plant in the country after the Kudankulam Nuclear Power Plant and Kakrapar Atomic Power Station in terms of installed capacity.

== History ==
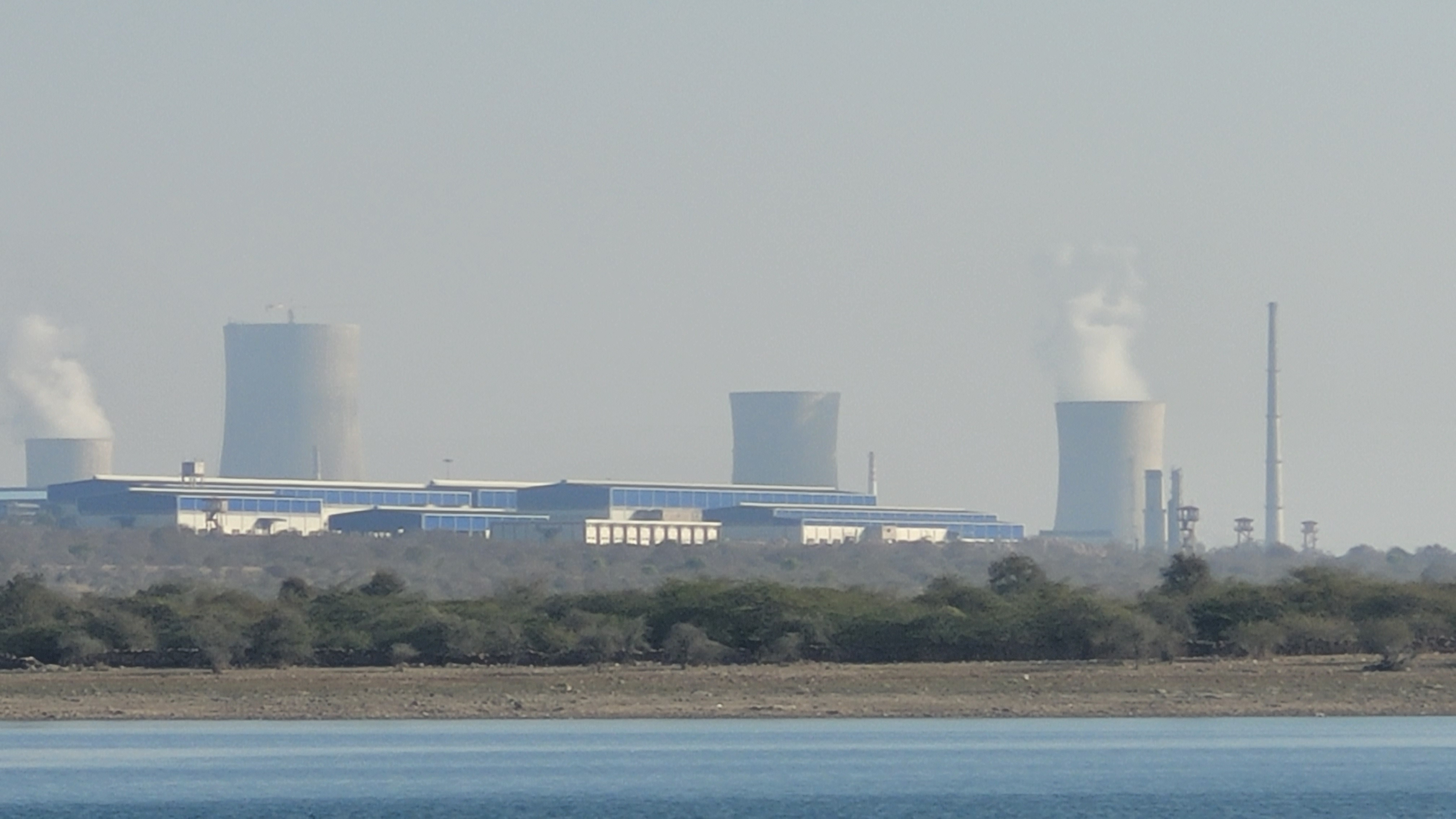
Rawatbhata Nuclear Powerplant

The construction of the Rajasthan Atomic Power Project (RAPP) began in 1963 with two CANDU (Canada Deuterium Uranium) pressurised heavy water reactor (PHWR) capable of producing 220 MW of electricity each. Ten years later, in 1973 RAPS-1 was put into service. In 1974 after India conducted Smiling Buddha, its first nuclear weapons test, Canada stopped its support of the project, delaying the commissioning of RAPS-2 until 1981.

Unit 1: In the early 1960s, Indian Department of Atomic Energy (DAE), and Canada's Atomic Energy of Canada limited AECL signed an MoU to build two reactors of 200 MW each. Construction began in 1963 and unit 1 achieved operational status in 1973. Since the beginning, it faced several technical issues such as cracks in the end shields, leak of the moderator, rupture of fuel channel, etc. To alleviate these issues, it was derated to 100MWe. But issues continued to occur. The unit had low-capacity factor, low availability and caused economic losses. Due to these issues and safety concerns, it was put in a permanent shutdown in October 2004.

Unit 2: When India conducted the 1974 Nuclear tests at Pokhran in Rajasthan, Canada withdrew from the project, leaving the DAE alone to develop the second reactor. Learning lessons from unit 1, and with help of other industries such as Bharat heavy electricals limited BHEL and L&T the reactor was completed and put into operation in 1981. It lacked many of the issues that had plagued Unit 1, yielding a capacity factor of 67.2% compared to Unit 1's 21.1% and continues to operate through 2024.

In the context of the Indian atomic program, two more PHWR with an output of 220 MW each were built. They cost around 570 million dollars. RAPS-3 became critical on 24 December 1999, RAPS-4 became critical on 3 November 2000. Commercial operations began on 1 June 2000 for unit 3, and on 23 December 2000 for unit 4.

Two more reactors (RAPS-5 and RAPS-6) with 220 MWe have also been built, with unit 5 beginning commercial operation on 4 February 2010, and unit 6 on 31 March 2010.

One of the new Indian-designed 700 MWe series of the reactor (RAPP-8) is under construction in Rajasthan. One (RAPP-7) was recently commissioned in April 2025.

In November 2012, the International Atomic Energy Agency (IAEA) intensively audited over several weeks two reactors at the Rajasthan Atomic Power Station for safety. It has been concluded that the reactors are among the best in the world, the indigenously made 220 MW atomic plants can withstand a Fukushima type of accident, even suggesting that the "safety culture is strong in India" and that India emerged a winner with a high global safety rank.

First concrete for unit 7 was poured on 18 July 2011, with commercial operation expected by 2016. First concrete for unit 8 was poured on 30 September 2011.

Unit 7 and unit 8 will cost together an estimated Rs 123.2 billion (US$2.6 billion).

In 2024, the AERB granted permission for unit 7 fuel loading and addition of moderator. The 19 September 2024, unit 7 started a controlled fission chain reaction.

In March 2025, unit 7 at Rajasthan site was connected to the grid. It is the 3rd 700 MWe indigenous pressurized heavy water reactor connected to the grid. It entered commercial operations in April of 2025.

== Incidents ==
By 2003, RAPS-1 had experienced numerous problems due to leaks, cracks in the end-shield and turbine blade failures, had undergone repairs and appeared to be generating 100 MW of electricity, with RAPS-2 reportedly generating 200 MW. Unit 1, due to its issues, technical and economic unviability, was decided to place into a permanent shutdown state in October 2004. It is the only unit owned by the Department of Atomic Energy.

On 29 August 2006, a 90% iron meteorite weighing 6.8 kilograms (15 lb) fell in Kanvarpura village, near the power station. The Deputy Director-General (western region) of the Geological Survey of India, R.S. Goyal, said that devastation on an "unimaginable scale" would have ensued had the object struck the station. However, the kinetic energy of a meteorite of this size is smaller than that of jet aircraft frequently used as a basis for impact resistance of containment structures.

In June 2012, 38 workers were exposed to tritium when a welding operation went wrong inside the protected environment of the reactor.

== Units ==
| Phase | Unit No. | Reactor | | Status | Capacity in MWe | | Construction start | First criticality | Grid Connection | Commercial operation | Closure | Notes |
| Phase | Unit No. | Type | Model | Status | Net | Gross | Construction start | First criticality | Grid Connection | Commercial operation | Closure | Notes |
|---|---|---|---|---|---|---|---|---|---|---|---|---|
| I | 1 | PHWR | CANDU | Shut Down-pending decommissioning | 90 | 100 | 1 August 1965 | 11 August 1972 | 30 November 1972 | 16 December 1973 | 9 October 2004 | |
| I | 2 | PHWR | CANDU | Operational | 187 | 200 | 1 April 1968 | 8 October 1980 | 1 November 1980 | 1 April 1981 | —N/a | |
| II | 3 | PHWR | IPHWR-220 | Operational | 202 | 220 | 1 February 1990 | 24 December 1999 | 10 March 2000 | 1 June 2000 | —N/a | |
| II | 4 | PHWR | IPHWR-220 | Operational | 202 | 220 | 1 October 1990 | 3 November 2000 | 17 November 2000 | 23 December 2000 | —N/a | |
| III | 5 | PHWR | IPHWR-220 | Operational | 202 | 220 | 18 September 2002 | 24 November 2009 | 22 December 2009 | 4 February 2010 | —N/a | |
| III | 6 | PHWR | IPHWR-220 | Operational | 202 | 220 | 20 January 2003 | 23 January 2010 | 28 March 2010 | 31 March 2010 | —N/a | |
| IV | 7 | PHWR | IPHWR-700 | Operational | 630 | 700 | 18 July 2011 | 19 September 2024 | 17 March 2025 | 15 April 2025 | —N/a | |
| IV | 8 | PHWR | IPHWR-700 | Under Construction | 630 | 700 | 30 September 2011 | —N/a | —N/a | 2026(planned) | —N/a | |
| V | 9 | PHWR | IPHWR-700 | Planned | 630 | 700 | —N/a | —N/a | —N/a | —N/a | —N/a | |
| V | 10 | PHWR | IPHWR-700 | Planned | 630 | 700 | —N/a | —N/a | —N/a | —N/a | —N/a | |

== Current status ==
Unit 1 was placed under permanent shutdown and is to be decommissioned. Units 2 through 7 are currently operational.

Unit 7 achieved criticality on 19 September 2024. On 17 March 2025, RAPS 7 was connected to the grid for the first time. This step was taken after clearance from the AERB. It came online for commercial operation on 15 April 2025, though still in the power ascension testing process and only achieved full rated power of 700 MW on 10 February 2026.

NPCIL reported in a video uploaded on its official YouTube channel that hot functional testing had begun on Unit 8 in February 2026.

== See also ==
- Nuclear power in India
