= IPHWR-220 =

Indian nuclear reactor design

IPHWR-220 Reactor Class
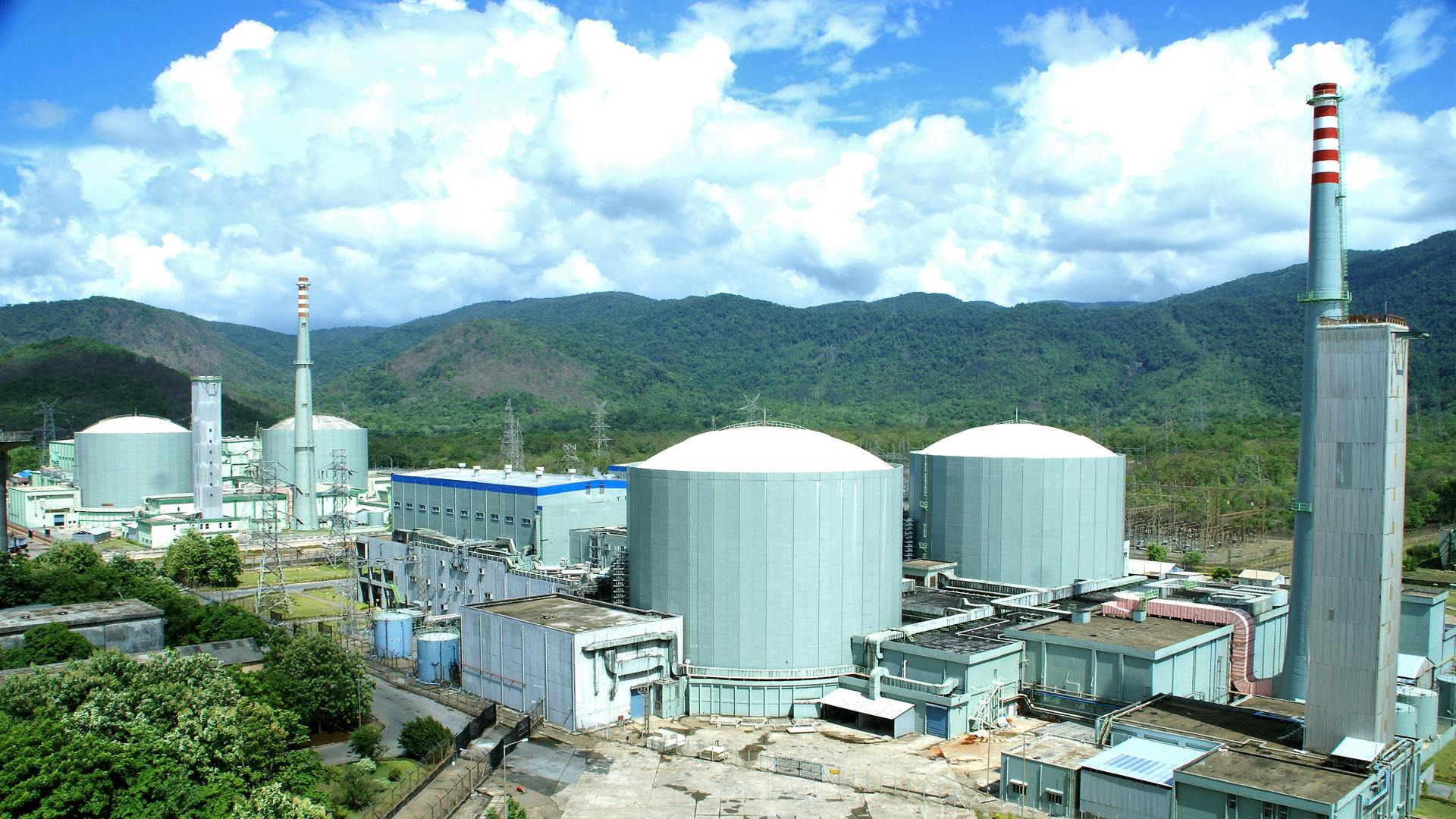
- Kaiga Atomic Power Plant, showing four IPHWR-220 reactors
- Generation: Generation II reactor
- Reactor concept: pressurized heavy-water reactor
- Reactor line: IPHWR (Indian Pressurized Heavy-water Reactor)
- Designed by: Bhabha Atomic Research Centre
- Manufactured by: PPED, DAE (now part of NPCIL)
- Status: 14 Operational

Main parameters of the reactor core
- Fuel (fissile material): ^{235}U (NU/SEU/LEU)
- Fuel state: Solid
- Neutron energy spectrum: Thermal
- Primary control method: control rods
- Primary moderator: Heavy water
- Primary coolant: Heavy water

Reactor usage
- Primary use: Generation of electricity
- Power (thermal): 754.5 MWth
- Power (electric): 220 MWe

The IPHWR-220 (Indian Pressurized Heavy Water Reactor-220) is an Indian pressurized heavy-water reactor designed by the Bhabha Atomic Research Centre. It is a Generation II reactor developed from earlier CANDU based RAPS-1 and RAPS-2 reactors built at Rawatbhata, Rajasthan. It can generate 220 MW of electricity. Currently, there are 14 units operational at various locations in India. It is being used as a base for designing the Bharat small modular reactor (BSMR), for captive use by companies.

The IPHWR design was later expanded into 540 MW and 700 MW designs, as well as the AHWR-300 design.

== Reactor fleet ==
IPHWR-220 Reactor fleet
Power station	Location	Operation start	Status
MAPS-1	Kalpakkam, Tamil Nadu	27 January 1984	Operational
MAPS-2	Kalpakkam, Tamil Nadu	21 March 1986	Operational
NAPS-1	Narora, Uttar Pradesh	1 January 1991	Operational
NAPS-2	Narora, Uttar Pradesh	1 July 1992	Operational
KAPS-1	Kakrapar, Gujarat	6 May 1993	Operational
KAPS-2	Kakrapar, Gujarat	1 September 1995	Operational
RAPS-3	Rawatbhata, Rajasthan	1 June 2000	Operational
RAPS-4	Rawatbhata, Rajasthan	23 December 2000	Operational
RAPS-5	Rawatbhata, Rajasthan	4 February 2010	Operational
RAPS-6	Rawatbhata, Rajasthan	31 March 2010	Operational
KGS-1	Kaiga, Karnataka	6 November 2000	Operational
KGS-2	Kaiga, Karnataka	6 May 2000	Operational
KGS-3	Kaiga, Karnataka	6 May 2007	Operational
KGS-4	Kaiga, Karnataka	27 November 2010	Operational

== Technical specifications ==
Specifications	IPHWR-220	IPHWR-540	IPHWR-700
Thermal output, MWth	754.5	1730	2166
Active power, MWe	220	540	700
Efficiency, net %	27.8	28.08	29.08
Coolant temperature, °C:	?		
core coolant inlet	249	266	
core coolant outlet	293.4	310	
Primary coolant material	Heavy Water		
Secondary coolant material	Light Water		
Moderator material	Heavy Water		
Reactor operating pressure, kg/cm^{2} (g)	87	100	
Active core height, cm	508.5	594	594
Equivalent core diameter, cm	451	-	638.4
Average fuel power density	9.24 KW/KgU	-	235 MW/m^{3}
Average core power density, MW/m^{3}	10.13	-	12.1
Fuel	Sintered Natural UO_{2} pellets		
Cladding tube material	Zircaloy-2	Zircaloy-4	
Fuel assemblies	3672	5096	4704 fuel bundles in 392 channels
Number of fuel rods in assembly	19 elements in 3 rings	37	37 elements in 4 rings
Enrichment of reload fuel	0.7% U-235		
Fuel cycle length, Months	24	12	
Average fuel burnup, MW · day / ton	6700	7500	7050
Control rods	SS/Co	Cadmium/SS	
Neutron absorber	Boric Anhydride	Boron	
Residual heat removal system	Active: Shutdown cooling system Passive: Natural circulation through steam generators	Active: Shutdown cooling system Passive: Natural circulation through steam generators and Passive Decay heat removal system	
Safety injection system	Emergency core cooling system		

== See also ==
- India's three-stage nuclear power programme
- Nuclear power in India
