= S. P. Udayakumar =

Indian politician

S. P. Udayakumar is a writer and anti-nuclear activist from Tamil Nadu, India. He is the convenor of the People's Movement Against Nuclear Energy (PMANE), which is protesting against the Kudankulam Nuclear Power Plant project.

== Life and career ==
S. P. Udayakumar was born in 1959 in Nagercoil in Tamilnadu.

He studied M. A. in Peace Studies from Notre Dame University, receiving the degree in 1990.

In 1993, Udayakumar, along with wife Meera, purchased 15 acres of land near Nagercoil ("at the southern tip of India") and founded the South Asian Community Center for Education and Research (SACCER). Johan Galtung, considered the founder of the discipline of peace and conflict studies, visited the school in 1994 and dedicated it.

Subsequently, Udayakumar obtained a PhD in Political Science from the University of Hawaii 1996.

== Books ==
- S. P. Udayakumar (1990), Intervention in Sri Lanka: History and Prospects, University of Notre Dame
- S. P. Udayakumar (2001), Handcuffed to History: Narratives, pathologies, and violence in South Asia, Praeger, ISBN 978-0-275-96843-4
- S. P. Udayakumar (2005), Presenting the Past: Anxious History and Ancient Future in Hindutva India, Greenwood Publishing Group, ISBN 978-0-275-97209-7
- Johan Galtung; S. P. Udayakumar, eds. (2013), More than a Curriculum: Education for Peace and Development, Charlotte: IAP – Information Age Publishing, ISBN 978-1-61735-549-3
