= People's Movement Against Nuclear Energy =

The People's Movement Against Nuclear Energy is an anti-nuclear power group in Tamil Nadu, India, founded by S. P. Udayakumar. Since September 2011 the aim of the group is to close the Kudankulam Nuclear Power Plant site and to preserve the largely untouched coastal landscape, as well as educate locals about nuclear power.

On 10 September 2012 around 1,000 anti-nuclear protesters tried to march towards the plant. The police responded with tear-gas shells.

Activist Udayakumaran urges Tamil Nadu government for the withdrawal of all cases against Kudankulam protesters which was dated on 20 September 2021. So far only 26 cases out of 89 cases have been withdrawn but, 63 cases still remain.
