= Kadra Dam =

- Kadra Dam in Uttara Kannada, India
- Official name: Kadra Dam
- Location: Uttara Kannada, India
- Coordinates: 14°53′57″N 74°21′19″E
- Opening date: 1997

Dam and spillways
- Type of dam: Earthen/ Gravity & Masonry
- Impounds: Kali River
- Height: 40.5 m (133 ft)
- Length: 2,313 m (7,589 ft)
- Width (crest): 30 m (98 ft)
- Width (base): 625 m (2,051 ft)
- Spillway type: Controlled, overflow

Reservoir
- Creates: Gobindsagar Reservoir
- Total capacity: 209 million m^3

Power Station
- Installed capacity: 150 MW
- Website http://www.karnatakapower.com/

Kadra Dam is situated in Uttara Kannada district of Karnataka state in India. The dam is constructed across Kali River. The dam was primarily built as hydroelectric project for supply of water to turbines of electric power generating station. The project started generating power since 1997. The Dam was built and is operated by KPCL since the year 1997.

The dam also supplies cooling water to the Kaiga Atomic Power Station.
