= Narora Atomic Power Station =

Indian nuclear power plant

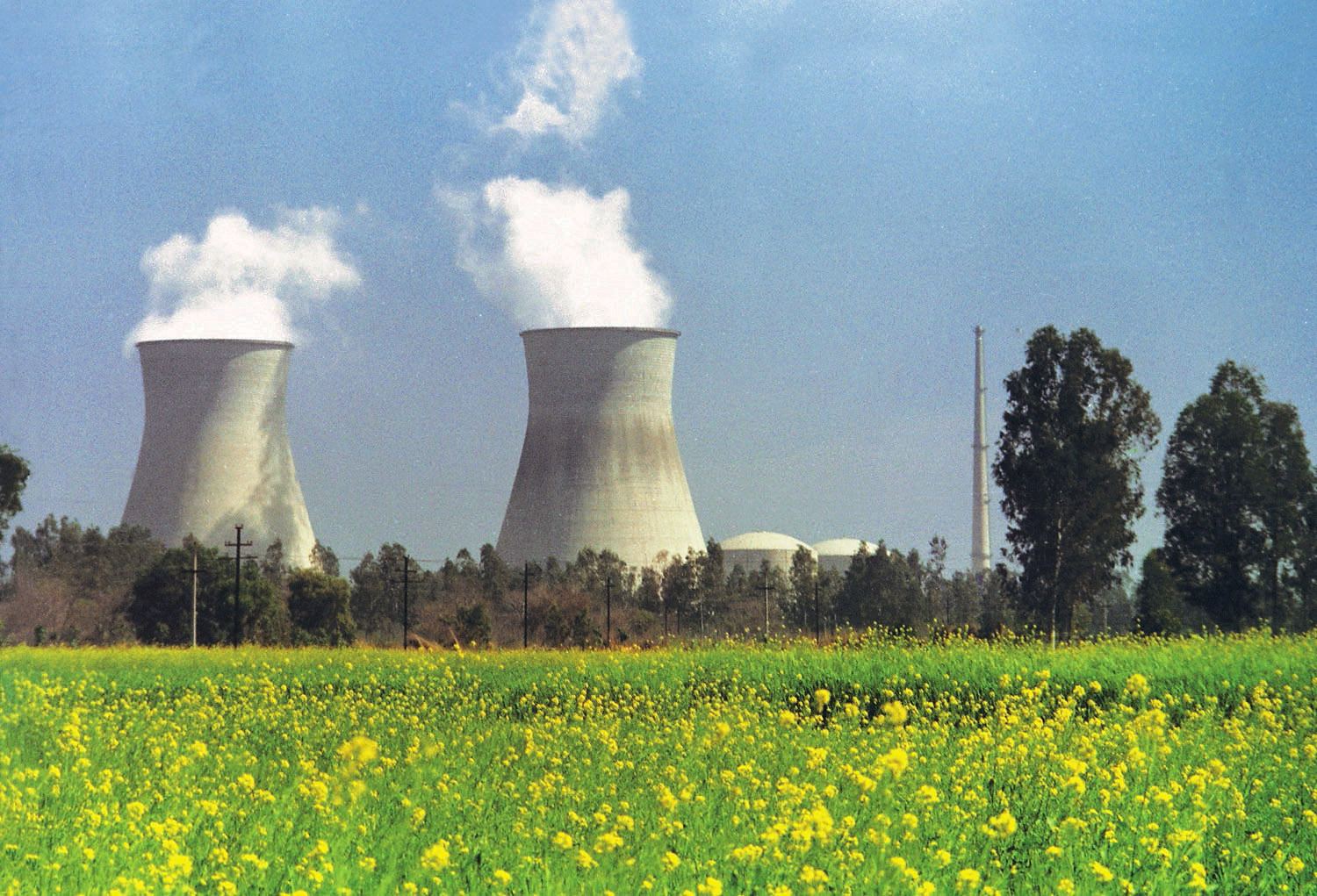
- Country: India (भारत)
- Location: Narora, Dibai Tehsil, Bulandshahar, Uttar Pradesh
- Coordinates: 28°09′29″N 78°24′34″E
- Status: Operational
- Construction began: 1 November 1977
- Commission date: Unit 1: 1 January 1991; Unit 2: 1 July 1992.
- Construction cost: 12.65 billion USD (APPROX)
- Owner: Nuclear Power Corporation of India
- Operator: Nuclear Power Corporation of India Ltd. (NPCIL)

Nuclear power station
- Reactors: 2
- Reactor type: PHWR
- Reactor supplier: NPCIL/BARC
- Cooling towers: 2 × Natural Draft
- Cooling source: Narora Barrage, River Ganga
- Thermal capacity: 2 × 754 MW_{th}

Power generation
- Units operational: 2 × 220 MW
- Make and model: IPHWR-220
- Nameplate capacity: 440 MW
- Capacity factor: 85.22% (2020–21)
- Annual net output: 3284.81 GW.h (2020–21)

External links
- Website: Nuclear Power Corporation of India
- Commons: Related media on Commons

Narora Atomic Power Station (NAPS) is a nuclear power plant located in Narora, Dibai Tehsil, Bulandshahar District in Uttar Pradesh, India.

== Reactors ==
The plant houses two reactors, each a pressurized heavy-water reactor (PHWR) capable of producing 220 MW of electricity. Commercial operation of NAPS-1 began on 1 January 1991, NAPS-2 on 1 July 1992.

The reactors were not originally under IAEA safeguards. but subsequent to the signing of the 1-2-3 agreement, they have been placed under IAEA monitoring with effect from 2014.

== Units ==
Phase	Unit No.	Reactor		Status	Capacity in MWe		Construction start	First criticality	Grid Connection	Commercial operation	Closure	Notes
Phase	Unit No.	Type	Model	Status	Net	Gross	Construction start	First criticality	Grid Connection	Commercial operation	Closure	Notes
I	1	PHWR	IPHWR-220	Operational	202	220	1 December 1976	12 March 1989	29 July 1989	1 January 1991	—N/a	
I	2	PHWR	IPHWR-220	Operational	202	220	1 November 1977	24 October 1991	5 January 1992	1 July 1992	—N/a	
II	3	PHWR	IPHWR-700	Planned	630	700	—N/a	—N/a	—N/a	—N/a	—N/a	
II	4	PHWR	IPHWR-700	Planned	630	700	—N/a	—N/a	—N/a	—N/a	—N/a	

== Incidents ==
On 31 May 1993, after 28 months of operation, two steam turbine blades in NAPS-1 malfunctioned causing a major fire. This fire propagated to the reactor's emergency cabling system and with that nearly led to the damage of the reactor core.
