= Kaiga =

Village in Karnataka, India

Coordinates: 14°51′14″N 74°25′59″E

Kaiga is a village in Uttara Kannada district of Karnataka in India. As of the 2011 Census of India, the village had a population of 238.

Kaiga is nearly 50 kilometres (31 mi) by road from Karwar. The Kaiga Generating Station, owned and operated by Nuclear Power Corporation of India (NPCIL) and comprising four units, is located there. NPCIL has also established a township for the benefit of its employees near Mallapur village. An Atomic Energy Central School has also been established in the township.
