= Kudankulam =

Town in Tamil Nadu, India

Coordinates: 8.19013°N 77.700248°E

Kudankulam is a town in the Tirunelveli district in Tamil Nadu, India. It is 20 km northeast of Kanyakumari, 30 km from Nagercoil, 70 km from Tirunelveli and about 105 km from Thiruvananthapuram.

The town is notable as the construction site of the Kudankulam Nuclear Power Plant. It is also the location of hundreds of windmills used for power generation, eight of which are on the grounds of the nuclear plant. These wind turbines have a total capacity of 2000 MW and represent one of the largest wind farms in India.

Since the beginning of 2011, Kudankulam has been embroiled in a nuclear plant controversy over fears of the plant safety.
