= Narora =

- Town
- Location in Uttar Pradesh, India
- Coordinates: 28°11′48″N 78°22′53″E
- Country: India
- State: Uttar Pradesh
- District: Bulandshahr
- Elevation: 174 m (571 ft)

Population (2011)
  - Total: 22,775

Languages
  - Official: Hindi
- Time zone: UTC+5:30 (IST)
- Postal code: 203389
- Website: https://www.facebook.com/narora.ganga

Narora (pronounced Naraura) is a town located on the banks of river Ganga, in tehsil Dibai, district Bulandshahr, Uttar Pradesh, India. It is popular for being the site of Nuclear Power Corporation of India Limited. The town has a large but stable riverbank formed by Ganga.

== Demographics ==
As of 2011 India census, Narora had a population of 22,775. Males constitute 53.5% of the population and females 46.5%. Its average literacy rate is 71.1%, higher than the national average of 67.68%, with male literacy 80.3% and female literacy 60.45%. In Narora, 13.3% of the population is under 6 years of age.

== Education ==
Places of education include Atomic Energy Central School 1 & 2, with Class 12 being the highest level of education available in Narora, which counts Mukul Trivedi IFS and Lieutenant General N. S. Raja Subramani, PVSM, AVSM, SM, VSM as its notable alumni.

== Attractions ==
=== Atomic Power Station ===
Narora is the site of the Narora Atomic Power Station and of the Narora Dam or Narora Barrage.

=== Ramsar Site ===
The Narora Ramsar site is an 82 km stretch of the Upper Ganga River in Uttar Pradesh, India, named after the Narora barrage. This riverine Ramsar site is a critical habitat for the critically endangered Ganges River Dolphin and provides a home for many other endangered faunal elements, including threatened waterbirds. The site, also known as the Upper Ganga River (Brijghat to Narora), was designated for its ecological importance and biodiversity, though it faces threats from sewage, agricultural runoff, and intensive fishing.

=== Banyan tree ===
Siddhi Bari banyan tree in Narora, is at least 450 years old.
