= Kudankulam Nuclear Power Plant =

Nuclear power plant in India

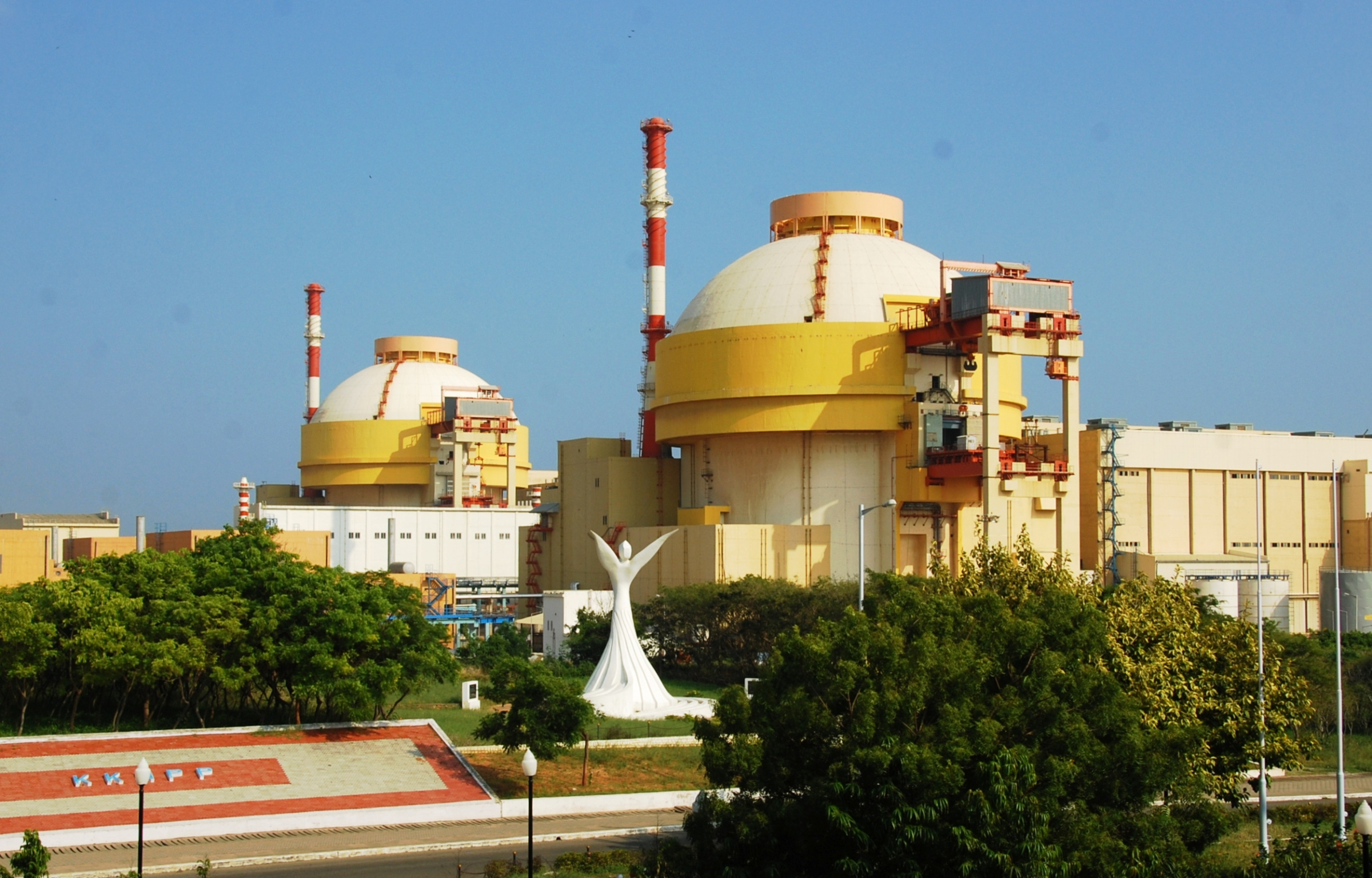
- Country: India
- Coordinates: 8°10′08″N 77°42′45″E
- Status: Operational
- Construction began: Unit 1: 31 March 2002; Unit 2: 4 July 2002; Units 3 & 4: 29 June 2017; Unit 5: 29 June 2021; Unit 6: 20 December 2021
- Commission date: Unit 1: 22 October 2013; Unit 2: 15 October 2016
- Construction cost: Units 1 & 2: ₹22,462 crore (US$4.76 billion) in 2001 prices Units 3 & 4 (Revised Cost): ₹68,893 crore Units 5 & 6 (Revised Cost): ₹69,437 crore
- Owner: Nuclear Power Corporation of India
- Operator: Nuclear Power Corporation of India

Nuclear power station
- Reactors: 6
- Reactor type: PWR
- Reactor supplier: Rosatom
- Cooling source: Laccadive Sea
- Thermal capacity: 2 × 3000 MW_{th}

Power generation
- Units operational: 2 × 1000 MW (gross)
- Make and model: VVER-1000/412
- Units under const.: 4 × 1000 MW (gross)
- Nameplate capacity: 2000 MW
- Capacity factor: 68.27% (2020–21)
- Annual net output: Unit 1: 7584.740 GWh (2023); Unit 2: 5988.250 GWh (2023)

External links
- Website: Nuclear Power Corporation of India
- Commons: Related media on Commons

Kudankulam Nuclear Power Plant (or Kudankulam NPP or KKNPP) is the largest nuclear power station in India, situated in Kudankulam in the Tirunelveli district of the southern Indian state of Tamil Nadu. Construction on the plant began on 31 March 2002, but faced several delays due to opposition from local fishermen. KKNPP is scheduled to have six VVER-1000 reactors built in collaboration with Atomstroyexport, the Russian state company and Nuclear Power Corporation of India Limited (NPCIL), with an installed capacity of 6,000 MW of electricity.

Unit 1 was synchronized with the southern power grid on 22 October 2013 and since then, has been generating electricity at its warranted limit of 1,000 MW.

In December 2025, Rosatom delivered the first batches of fuel to the plant, to be loaded into the core of the third power unit of the site. The TVS-2M fuel has been designed for a 18 month fuel cycle. Pre commissioning activities also began at the site of unit 3 in late 2025.

== History ==
=== Background ===
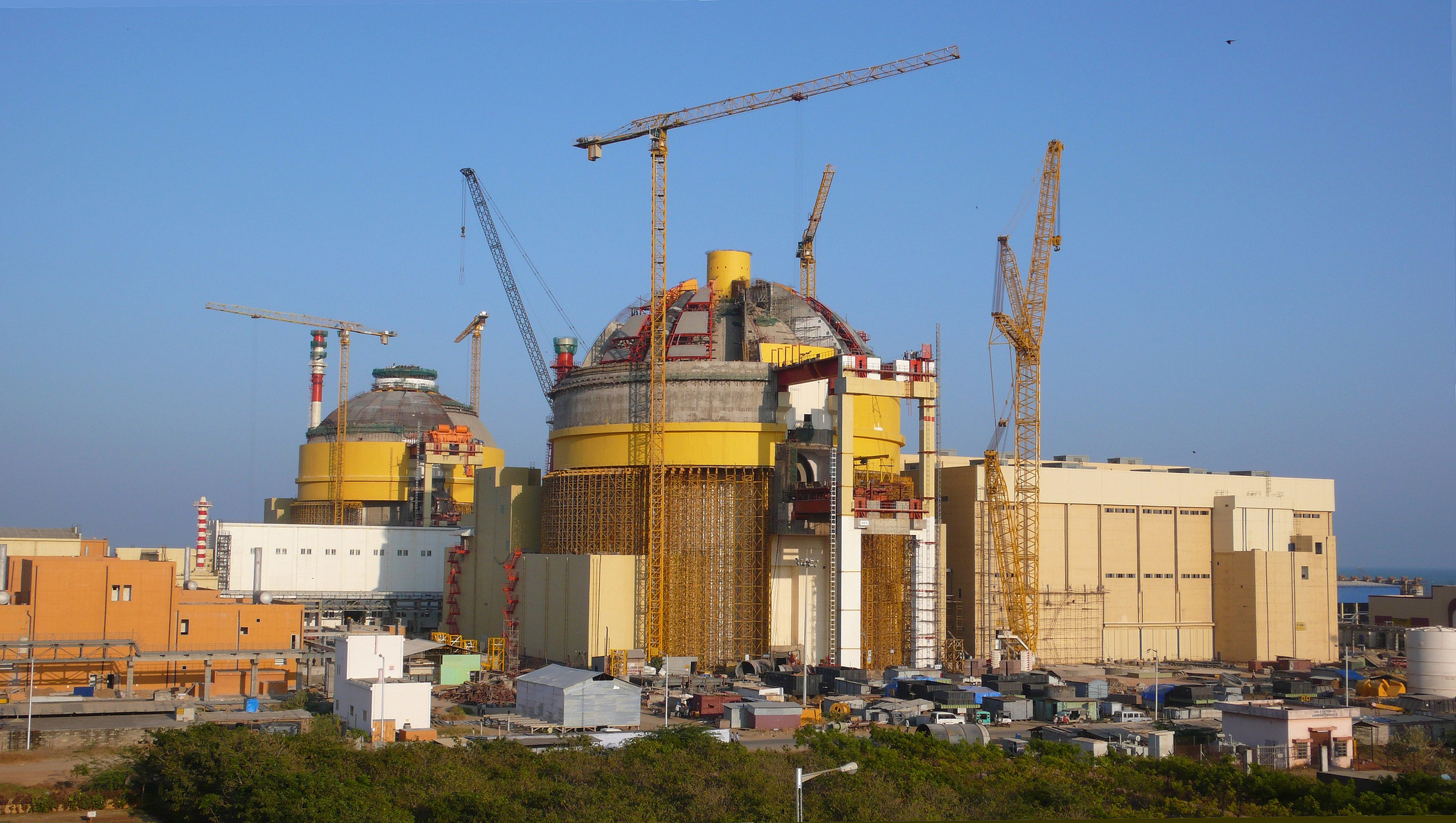
Kudankulum under construction, 14 April 2009

An intergovernmental agreement (IGA) on the project was signed on 20 November 1988 by the Prime Minister of India, Rajiv Gandhi and the Soviet head of state, Mikhail Gorbachev, for the construction of two reactors. The project remained in limbo for a decade due to the dissolution of the Soviet Union. There were also objections from the United States, on the grounds that the agreement did not meet the 1992 terms of the Nuclear Suppliers Group (NSG). M. R. Srinivasan, Atomic Energy Commission (AEC) Chairman from 1987 to 1990, called the project "a non-starter". However, the project was revived on 21 June 1998.

=== Construction ===
Construction began on 31 March 2002, with the Nuclear Power Corporation of India Ltd (NPCIL) predicting that the first unit would be operational in March 2007, instead of the original target of December 2007.

A small port became operational in Kudankulam on 14 January 2004. This port was established to receive barges carrying over-sized light water reactor equipment from ships anchored at a distance of 1.5 kilometres (0.93 mi). Until 2004, materials had to be brought in via road from the port of Thoothukudi, risking damage during transportation. In 2008, negotiations on building four additional reactors at the site began. Though the capacity of these reactors had not been declared, it was expected that the capacity of each reactor will be 1,200 MW (1.2 GW). The new reactors would bring the total capacity of the power plant to 6,800 MW (6.8 GW). These reactors never entered the planning phase after being proposed, mostly due to protests and due to other reasons. No such units are currently planned or under construction.

The ground-breaking ceremony for construction of third and fourth units was performed on 17 February 2016 and AERB authorised the first pour of concrete on 19 June 2017. Construction of the third and fourth units started on 29 June 2017. AERB granted excavation permit for Unit 5 and 6 in 14 November 2018 and concerete pour begun in 2020. Construction of units 5 and 6 commenced on 29 June 2021. Unit 5 is expected to be ready for commissioning in December 2026, while unit 6 is expected to be ready by September 2027.

In June 2026, the reactor vessel for unit 5 was placed into its permanent position in the containment building with help of a heavy duty crane.

=== Cyber-attack ===
In 2019, NPCIL confirmed identification of malware in the internet connected administrative network but said that the critical internal network was isolated. KKNPP officials had earlier termed reports on the cyber attack as false. The malware was linked to the North Korea based Lazarus Group.

== Economics ==
=== Cost and Funding ===
==== Unit 1 and 2 ====
The original cost of the first two units was ₹ 13,171 crore, but it was later revised to ₹ 17,270 crore. The cost was revised again to ₹22,462 crore ($4.76 billion in USD 2001) in 2014 due to increased expenses related to Interest During Construction (IDC), labor costs, operational expenses, and the deployment of Russian specialists at Kudankulam. Russia advanced a credit of ₹ 6,416 crore (US$0.97 billion) for both the units.

In 2015, Nuclear Power Corporation Ltd (NPCIL) announced a price of ₹ 4.29/kW·h (6.4 ¢/kW·h) for energy delivered from the first two units of Kudankulam nuclear power plant.

==== Unit 3 and 4 ====
The ground-breaking ceremony for construction of units 3 & 4 was performed on 17 February 2016. Due to technology changes, inflation and insistence of the supplier and operator for additional liability insurance the construction cost of units 3 & 4 amounted to twice the cost of units 1 & 2 and was later revised to be ₹39,849 crore (US$6.12 billion). However, this figure was revised again to ₹68,893 crore in July 2026.

==== Unit 5 and 6 ====
A budget of ₹49,621 crore (US$6.7 billion) had been approved for construction of Units 5 & 6. By July 2026, this figure had increased to ₹69,437 crore.

== Contract details ==
Rosatom has been awarded the Engineering and Procurement (EP) contract for the Kudankulam Nuclear Power Plant, with the Indian side responsible for the construction and commissioning. This differs from the contract Rosatom was awarded in Bangladesh for Rooppur Nuclear Power Plant, which encompassed Engineering, Procurement, and Construction (EPC) as well as the commissioning of the plant.

The Indian firm Larsen and Toubro has been awarded the construction contract, which includes the development of the reactor building, reactor auxiliary building, turbine building, diesel generator building, and other buildings associated with safety.

== Design and specification ==
The reactors are pressurised water reactor of Russian design, model VVER-1000/V-412 referred also as AES-92. Thermal capacity is 3,000 MW, gross electrical capacity is 1,000 MW with a net capacity of 917 MW. Construction is by NPCIL and Atomstroyexport. The plant is the largest nuclear power generation complex in India producing a cumulative 2 GW of electric power. Both units are water-cooled, water-moderated pressurized water reactors.

== Operations ==
The first reactor of the plant attained criticality on 13 July 2013 and was connected to the grid three months later. It started commercial operation from 31 December 2014. The second unit achieved criticality on 10 July 2016 and was connected to the grid in August. Commercial operation started on 15 October 2016.

The Kerala State Electricity Board (KSEB) board members have approved signing of a power purchase agreement (PPA) with the Nuclear Power Corporation of India (NPCIL) for sourcing electricity from the Kudankulam nuclear power project (KKNPP).

Unit 1 was shut down in June 2015 for refuelling and annual maintenance. On 21 January 2016, the reactor restarted and was connected to grid on 30 January.

Kudankulam Nuclear Power Project Site Director D. S. Choudhary stated on 26 January 2018 that units 1 and 2 of the nuclear plant had generated a combined total of 22,800 million units since they began functioning.

In October 2025, the Central electricity regulatory body granted permission to NPCIL to use 50MWe from Units 1 and 2 for the commissioning of units 3 and 4. According to the plant director, unit 3 is expected to be commissioned in 2026.

In April 2026, NPCIL announced to have achieved the 'Spill to open reactor' stage. It refers to flushing the reactor systems for operation and testing. It is said to be a significant step for commissioning the unit.

Unit one has been suffering from frequent problems with its turbogenerators, which had led to repair shutdowns.

== Opposition ==
People had been opposing the plant since its proposal in 1979. The proposal however, was halted because of the protests. It was brought back in 2000, and construction started under the government of Atal Bihari Vajpayee.

In 2011, thousands from the vicinity of the plant protested against it, fearing a nuclear disaster, in the wake of the Fukushima Daiichi nuclear disaster According to the protesters, evacuation of people in the event of a nuclear disaster would be impossible. According to S P Udayakumar, of the People's Movement Against Nuclear Energy, "the nuclear plant is unsafe". However, in 2012, the chief of India's nuclear energy programme, Dr Srikumar Banerjee, called the plant "one of the safest" in the world. In December 2012, The Hindu reported that hundreds of villagers in the region were largely ignorant of the risks and benefits of the plant.

A public interest litigation (PIL) was filed in 2011 with the Supreme Court asking for nuclear power development to be delayed until safety concerns were independently assessed. In May 2013, the Supreme Court ruled in favour of the plant, stating that the nuclear power plant was in the larger public interest.

In March 2012, 182 anti-nuclear protesters were detained for a few hours by the police. The protesters were set to join protests objecting resumption of work of one of two 1 GW reactors, a day after the local government restarted work on the project. On 10 September 2012 around 1,000 anti-nuclear protesters tried to march towards the plant. The police responded with tear-gas shells and lead to two deaths. Between 2011-2013, 8,856 sedition charges were filed against protestors from these villages.

There have also been rallies and protests in favour of commissioning this nuclear power plant.

On, 24 February 2012, Prime Minister Manmohan Singh blamed foreign NGOs for protests at the power plant. News agencies reported that three NGOs had diverted donations earmarked for religious and social causes to the protests, in violation of foreign exchange regulations.

Supporters of the power plant in Idinthakarai village have been targeted by opponents using improvised explosive devices.

The Church of South India and the National Council of Churches opposed the power plant and supported the protests against it. Supporters of the power plant and the government have alleged that the protest against the power plant was instigated by churches and funded by foreign sources. The protestors dismissed the allegation of foreign funding, but said that seeking support from church was "natural" as many protestors were Christian localities living in the vicinity of the Reactor.

=== Response from officials ===
Former chairman of Atomic Energy Commission of India Srinivasan said, "The Fukushima plant was built on a beach-front, but the Kudankulam was constructed on a solid terrain and that too keeping all the safety aspects in mind. Also, we are not in a tsunami prone area. The plants in Kudankulam have a double containment system which can withstand high pressure. At least ₹ 14,000 crore has been spent. If we don't operate the plant immediately, it will affect the economic stability of our country".

A centre panel constituted by the Government of India, which did a survey of the safety features in the plant, vouched for the safety of the Kudankulam reactors. Dr Muthunayagam, who headed the panel, said that the protesters asked for some documents which are not related to the safety of the reactor. Nuclear scientist and principal scientific adviser to the federal Government of India Rajagopala Chidambaram has said "We have learnt lessons from the Fukushima nuclear accident, particularly on the post-shut-down cooling system", and also added Fukushima nuclear accident should not deter or inhibit India from pursuing a safe civil nuclear programme.

The Tamil Nadu state government formed a four-member expert panel which submitted a report to the government after inspecting the safety features of the plant. The Tamil Nadu government in the wake of the acute power shortages in the state has ordered in favour of the commissioning of the plant.

== Allocation of power ==
Government of India announced the power allocation from the two units of the reactor on 29 August 2013.

| Beneficiary | Power (MW) |
|---|---|
| Tamil Nadu | 925 MW |
| Karnataka | 442 MW |
| Kerala | 266 MW |
| Puducherry | 67 MW |
| For commissioning of units 3 and 4 | 50 MW |
| Unallotted | 250 MW |
| Total | 2,000 MW |

As of 1 December 2021, the government is considering to increase its capability to 6,000 MW, on completion of KKNPP-3 & 4 (2 x 1,000 MW) and KKNPP-5 & 6 (2 x 1,000 MW) which are presently under construction.

== Kudankulam Alley ==
The town council of Volgodonsk, Rostov Oblast named a lane located next to the Atommash plant as Kudankulam Alley in November 2018. The plant, which is owned by Rosatom, manufactures equipment for the Kudankulam Nuclear Power Plant.

== Units ==
| Phase | Unit No. | Reactor | | Status | Capacity in MWe | | Construction start | First criticality | Grid Connection | Commercial operation | Closure | Notes |
| Phase | Unit No. | Type | Model | Status | Net | Gross | Construction start | First criticality | Grid Connection | Commercial operation | Closure | Notes |
|---|---|---|---|---|---|---|---|---|---|---|---|---|
| I | 1 | PWR | VVER-1000 | Operational | 917 | 1000 | 31 March 2002 | 13 July 2013 | 22 October 2013 | 31 December 2014 | —N/a | |
| I | 2 | PWR | VVER-1000 | Operational | 917 | 1000 | 4 July 2002 | 10 July 2016 | 29 August 2016 | 31 March 2017 | —N/a | |
| II | 3 | PWR | VVER-1000 | Under Construction | 917 | 1000 | 29 June 2017 | —N/a | —N/a | 2026(planned) | —N/a | |
| II | 4 | PWR | VVER-1000 | Under Construction | 917 | 1000 | 23 October 2017 | —N/a | —N/a | —N/a | —N/a | |
| III | 5 | PWR | VVER-1000 | Under Construction | 917 | 1000 | 29 June 2021 | —N/a | —N/a | —N/a | —N/a | |
| III | 6 | PWR | VVER-1000 | Under Construction | 917 | 1000 | 20 December 2021 | —N/a | —N/a | —N/a | —N/a | |

== See also ==
- Nuclear Power Corporation of India
- Nuclear power in India
