= Pressurized heavy-water reactor =

Nuclear reactor design

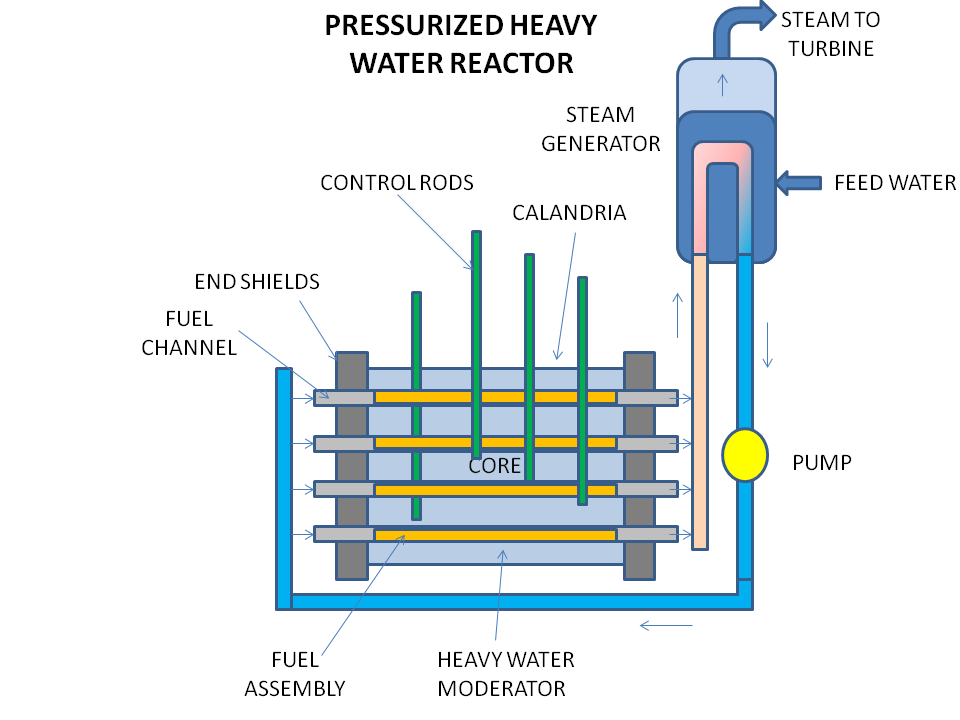
Diagram of a pressurized heavy-water reactor.

A pressurized heavy-water reactor (PHWR) is a nuclear reactor that uses heavy water (deuterium oxide D_{2}O) as its coolant and neutron moderator. PHWRs frequently use natural uranium as fuel, but sometimes also use very low enriched uranium. The heavy water coolant is kept under pressure to avoid boiling, allowing it to reach higher temperature (mostly) without forming steam bubbles, exactly as for a pressurized water reactor (PWR). While heavy water is very expensive to isolate from ordinary water (often referred to as light water in contrast to heavy water), its low absorption of neutrons greatly increases the neutron economy of the reactor, avoiding the need for enriched fuel. The high cost of the heavy water is offset by the lowered cost of using natural uranium and/or alternative fuel cycles. As of 2025, 43 PHWRs were in operation, having a total capacity of 23.430 GW(e), representing roughly 11% by number and 6.5% by generating capacity of all current operating reactors. CANDU and IPHWR are the most common type of reactors in the PHWR family. Other designs include the German design PHWR KWU installed at Atucha Nuclear Power Plant in Argentina.

== Purpose of using heavy water ==
The key to maintaining a nuclear chain reaction within a nuclear reactor is to use, on average, exactly one of the neutrons released from each nuclear fission event to stimulate another nuclear fission event (in another fissionable nucleus). With careful design of the reactor's geometry, and careful control of the substances present so as to influence the reactivity, a self-sustaining chain reaction or "criticality" can be achieved and maintained.

Natural uranium consists of a mixture of various isotopes, primarily ^{238}U and a much smaller amount (about 0.72% by weight) of ^{235}U.

^{238}U can only be fissioned by neutrons that are relatively energetic, about 1 MeV or above. No amount of ^{238}U can be made "critical" since it will tend to parasitically absorb more neutrons than it releases by the fission process. ^{235}U, on the other hand, can support a self-sustained chain reaction, but due to the low natural abundance of ^{235}U, natural uranium cannot achieve criticality by itself.

In a heavy water reactor, the trick to achieving criticality using only natural or low enriched uranium, for which there is no "bare" critical mass, is to slow down the emitted neutrons (without absorbing them) to the point where enough of them may cause further nuclear fission in the small amount of ^{235}U which is available. (^{238}U which is the bulk of natural uranium is also fissionable with fast neutrons.) This requires the use of a neutron moderator, which absorbs virtually all of the neutrons' kinetic energy, slowing them down to the point that they reach thermal equilibrium with surrounding material. It has been found beneficial to the neutron economy to physically separate the neutron energy moderation process from the uranium fuel itself, as ^{238}U has a high probability of absorbing neutrons with intermediate kinetic energy levels, a reaction known as "resonance" absorption. This is a fundamental reason for designing reactors with separate solid fuel segments, surrounded by the moderator, rather than any geometry that would give a homogeneous mix of fuel and moderator.

In a light water reactor, water makes an excellent moderator; the ordinary hydrogen or protium atoms in the water molecules are very close in mass to a single neutron, and so their collisions result in a very efficient transfer of momentum, similar conceptually to the collision of two billiard balls. However, as well as being a good moderator, ordinary water is also quite effective at absorbing neutrons. And so using ordinary water as a moderator will easily absorb so many neutrons that too few are left to sustain a chain reaction with the small isolated ^{235}U nuclei in the fuel, thus precluding criticality in natural uranium. Because of this, a light-water reactor will require that the ^{235}U isotope be concentrated in its uranium fuel, as enriched uranium, generally between 3% and 5% ^{235}U by weight (the by-product from this process enrichment process is known as depleted uranium, and so consisting mainly of ^{238}U, chemically pure). The degree of enrichment needed to achieve criticality with a light-water moderator depends on the exact geometry and other design parameters of the reactor.

One complication of this light water approach is the need for uranium enrichment facilities, which are generally expensive to build and operate. They also present a nuclear proliferation concern; the same systems used to enrich the ^{235}U can also be used to produce much more "pure" weapons-grade material (90% or more ^{235}U), suitable for producing a nuclear weapon. This is not a trivial exercise by any means, but feasible enough that enrichment facilities present a significant nuclear proliferation risk.

The solution to this problem, in a PHWR (pressurized heavy water reactor), is to use a moderator that does not absorb neutrons as readily as water. In this case potentially all of the neutrons being released can be moderated and used in reactions with the ^{235}U, in which case there is enough ^{235}U in natural uranium to sustain criticality. One such moderator is heavy water, or deuterium-oxide. Although it reacts dynamically with the neutrons in a fashion similar to light water (albeit with less energy transfer on average, given that heavy hydrogen, or deuterium, is about twice the mass of hydrogen), it already has the extra neutron that light water would normally tend to absorb.

== Advantages and disadvantages ==
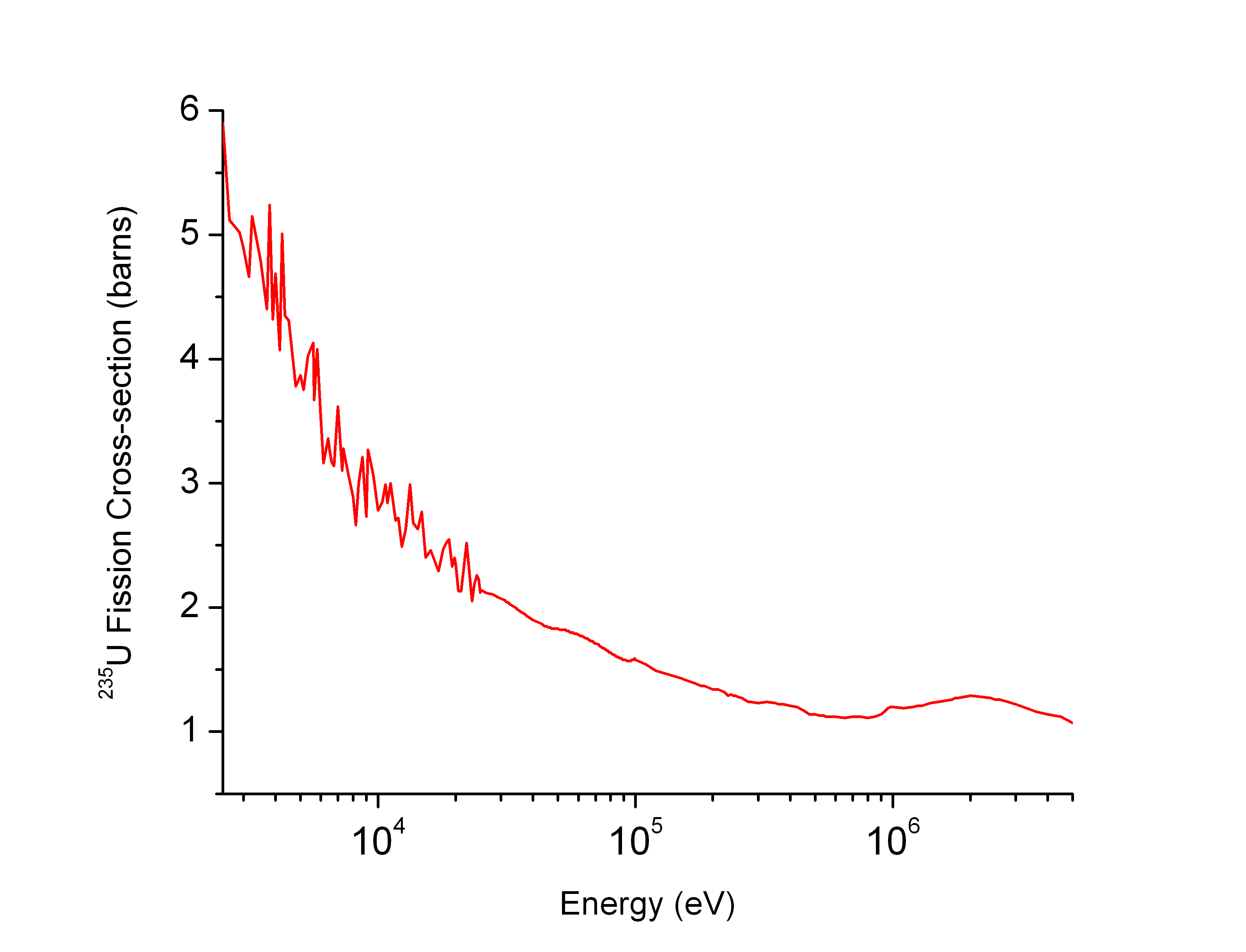
^{235}U fission cross section – while a nonlinear relationship is apparent, it is clear that in most cases lower neutron temperature will increase the likelihood of fission, thus explaining the need for a neutron moderator and the desirability of keeping its temperature as low as feasible.

=== Advantages ===
The use of heavy water as the moderator is the key to the PHWR (pressurized heavy water reactor) system, enabling the use of natural uranium as the fuel (in the form of ceramic UO_{2}), which means that it can be operated without expensive uranium enrichment facilities. The mechanical arrangement of the PHWR, which places most of the moderator at lower temperatures, is particularly efficient because the resulting thermal neutrons have lower energies (neutron temperature after successive passes through a moderator roughly equals the temperature of the moderator) than in traditional designs, where the moderator normally is much hotter. The neutron cross section for fission is higher in ^{235}U the lower the neutron temperature is, and thus lower temperatures in the moderator make successful interaction between neutrons and fissile material more likely. These features mean that a PHWR can use natural uranium and other fuels, and does so more efficiently than light water reactors (LWRs). CANDU type PHWRs are claimed to be able to handle fuels including reprocessed uranium or even spent nuclear fuel from "conventional" light water reactors as well as MOX fuel and there is ongoing research into the ability of CANDU type reactors to operate exclusively on such fuels in a commercial setting. (More on that in the article on the CANDU reactor itself)

=== Disadvantages ===
Pressurized heavy-water reactors do have some drawbacks. Heavy water generally costs hundreds of dollars per kilogram, though the higher price is a trade-off against reduced fuel costs. The reduced energy content of natural uranium as compared to enriched uranium necessitates more frequent replacement of fuel; this is normally accomplished by use of an on-power refueling system. The increased rate of fuel movement through the reactor also results in higher volumes of spent fuel than in LWRs employing enriched uranium. Since unenriched uranium fuel accumulates a lower density of fission products than enriched uranium fuel, however, it generates less heat, allowing more compact storage. While deuterium has a lower neutron capture cross section than protium, this value isn't zero and thus part of the heavy water moderator will inevitably be converted to tritiated water. While tritium, a radioactive isotope of hydrogen, is also produced as a fission product in minute quantities in other reactors, tritium can more easily escape to the environment if it is also present in the cooling water, which is the case in those PHWRs that use heavy water as both moderator and as coolant. Some CANDU reactors separate out the tritium from their heavy water inventory at regular intervals and sell it at a profit, however.

While typical CANDU-derived fuel bundles have a slightly positive void coefficient of reactivity, the Argentina-designed CARA fuel bundles used in Atucha I, are capable of the preferred negative coefficient.

== Nuclear proliferation ==
While prior to India's development of nuclear weapons (see below), the ability to use natural uranium (and thus forego the need for uranium enrichment which is a dual-use technology) was seen as hindering nuclear proliferation, this opinion has changed drastically in light of the ability of several countries to build atomic bombs out of plutonium, which can easily be produced in heavy water reactors. Heavy-water reactors may thus pose a greater risk of nuclear proliferation versus comparable light-water reactors due to the low neutron absorption properties of heavy water, discovered in 1937 by Hans von Halban and Otto Frisch. Occasionally, when an atom of ^{238}U is exposed to neutron radiation, its nucleus will capture a neutron, changing it to ^{239}U. The ^{239}U then rapidly undergoes two β^{−} decays, both emitting an electron and an antineutrino, the first one transmuting the ^{239}U into ^{239}Np, and the second one transmuting the ^{239}Np into ^{239}Pu. Although this process takes place with natural uranium using other moderators such as ultra-pure graphite or beryllium, heavy water is by far the best. The Manhattan Project ultimately used graphite moderated reactors to produce plutonium, while the German wartime nuclear project wrongfully dismissed graphite as a suitable moderator due to overlooking impurities and thus made unsuccessful attempts using heavy water (which they correctly identified as an excellent moderator). The Soviet nuclear program likewise used graphite as a moderator and ultimately developed the graphite-moderated RBMK as a reactor capable of producing both large amounts of electric power and weapons-grade plutonium without the need for heavy water or, at least according to initial design specifications, uranium enrichment.

^{239}Pu is a fissile material suitable for use in nuclear weapons. As a result, if the fuel of a heavy-water reactor is changed frequently, significant amounts of weapons-grade plutonium can be chemically extracted from the irradiated natural uranium fuel by nuclear reprocessing.

In addition, the use of heavy water as a moderator results in the production of small amounts of tritium when the deuterium nuclei in the heavy water absorb neutrons, a very inefficient reaction. Tritium is essential for the production of boosted fission weapons, which in turn enable the easier production of thermonuclear weapons, including neutron bombs. This process is currently expected to provide (at least partially) tritium for ITER.

The proliferation risk of heavy-water reactors was demonstrated when India produced the plutonium for Operation Smiling Buddha, its first nuclear weapon test, by extraction from the spent fuel of a heavy-water research reactor known as the CIRUS reactor.

== See also ==
- Chicago Pile-3, the first heavy water reactor
- CANDU reactor: The predominant type of PHWR
- IPHWR-700 and IPHWR-220, PHWR types developed in India
- List of nuclear reactors
- Pressurized water reactor
