= Indian locomotive class WCM-1 =

Class of 1950s electric locomotives

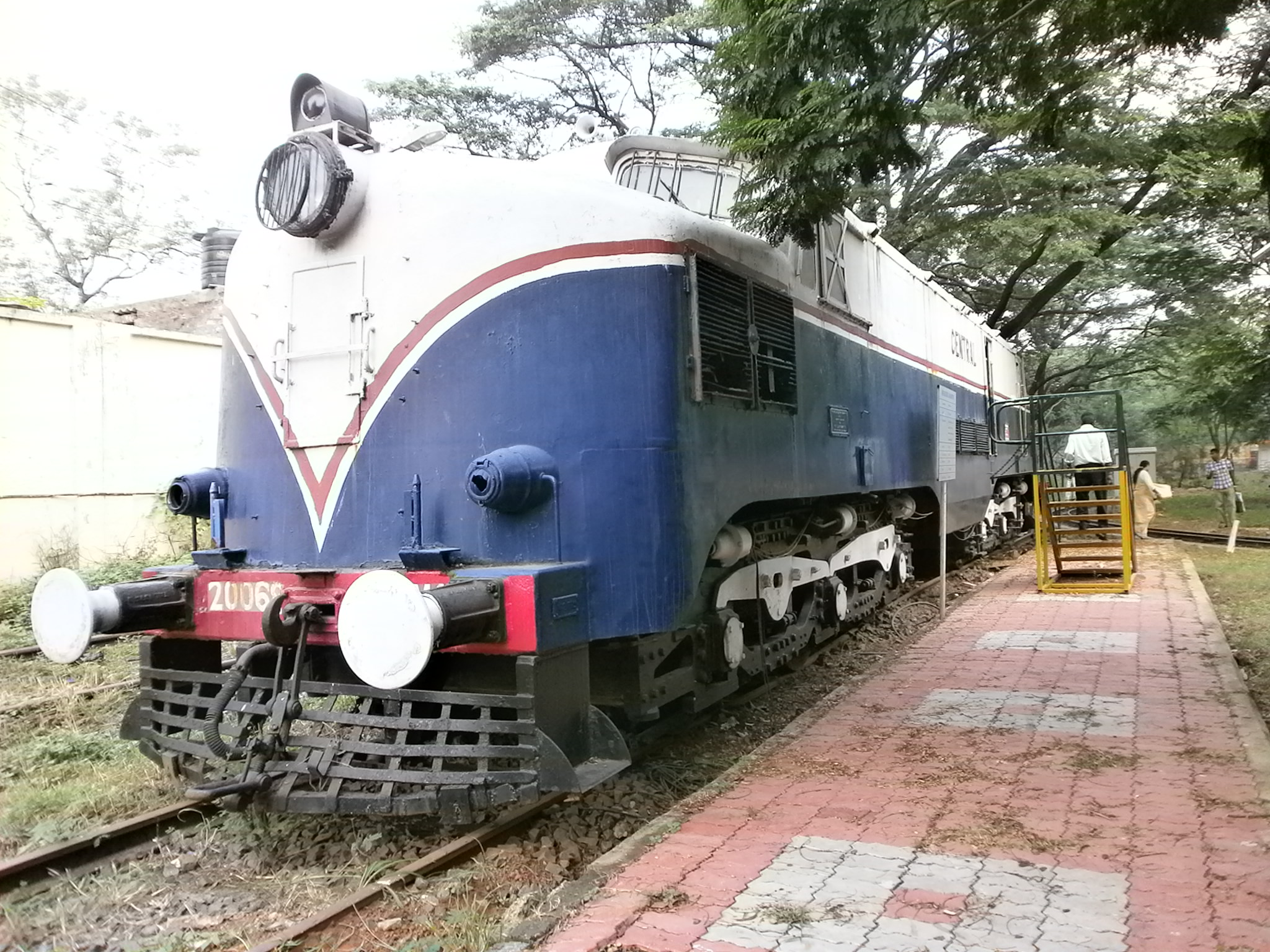
- A WCM-1 preserved at ICF Rail Museum, Chennai
Type and origin
- Power type: Electric
- Designer: Vulcan Foundry, English Electric
- Builder: English Electric
- Order number: M3559/53261/51
- Model: EM/1
- Build date: 1954–1955
- Total produced: 7
- Rebuilder: Electric Loco Shed, Kalyan
- Rebuild date: 1968
- Number rebuilt: 7
Specifications
- Configuration
  - AAR: C-C
  - UIC: Co′Co′
  - Commonwealth: Co-Co
- Gauge: 5 ft 6 in (1,676 mm)
- Bogies: 3 Axle fabricated frame, Swing bolster with Equalizer beams
- Wheel diameter: New: 1,220 mm (4 ft 0 in), Half worn: 1,182 mm (3 ft 10 1/2 in) and Full worn: 1,114 mm (3 ft 8 in)
- Wheelbase: 2,400 mm (7 ft 10 in)
- Length
  - Over couplers: 20.836 m (68 ft 4 5/16 in)
  - Over body: 19.5 m (63 ft 11 11/16 in)
- Width: 3.169 m (10 ft 4 3/4 in)
- Height: 4.292 m (14 ft 1 in)
- Frame type: 3 Axle fabricated frame
- Axle load: 20.83 tonnes (20.50 long tons; 22.96 short tons)
- Loco weight: 123.98 tonnes (122.02 long tons; 136.66 short tons)
- Sandbox cap.: 8+8 sandboxes
- Power supply: 110 V DC
- Electric system/s: 1.5 kV DC Overhead
- Current pickup: Pantograph
- Traction motors: E.E.514/2C
  - Rating 1 hour: 700A
  - Continuous: 600A
- Gear ratio: 16:59
- MU working: Not possible
- Loco brake: Air/Hand, Regenerative braking
- Train brakes: Vacuum
- Compressor: 7 kg/cm
- Safety systems: Slip control, Over voltage relay, No volt relay, Earth fault relay, Low pressure governor, Train parting alarms, and Brake cylinder cutoff valve
Performance figures
- Maximum speed: 120.5 km/h (75 mph)
- Power output
  - Starting: Max: 3,700 hp (2,760 kW)
  - 1 hour: Max: 3,700 hp (2,760 kW)
  - Continuous: Max: 3,170 hp (2,360 kW)
- Tractive effort
  - Starting: 31,000 kgf (300 kN)
  - 1 hour: 21,772 kgf (210 kN)
  - Continuous: 17,690 kgf (170 kN)
Career
- Operators: Indian Railways
- Class: EM/1
- Numbers: 20066-20072
- Locale: Central Railways
- Delivered: 1954-1955
- First run: 1955
- Last run: 1999
- Retired: January 2000
- Withdrawn: April 2001
- Preserved: 1
- Scrapped: May 2001
- Current owner: Chennai Rail Museum
- Disposition: One preserved, remainder scrapped.

The Indian locomotive class WCM-1 is a class of 1.5 kV DC electric locomotives that was developed in 1954 by Vulcan Foundry and English Electric for Indian Railways. The model name stands for broad gauge (W), Direct Current (C), Mixed traffic (M) engine, 1st generation (1). They entered service in 1955. A total of 7 WCM-1 locomotives were built in England between 1954 and 1955.

The WCM-1 served both passenger and freight trains for over 45 years. With the introduction of more modern types of locomotives and 25 KV AC electrification, all were withdrawn by the early 2000s after repeated failures. One locomotive has been preserved, with the rest being scrapped.

== History ==
The WCM-1 were designed in the mid-1950s with the intent for the Indian Railways (IR) to remove the aging fleet of WCP-1, WCP-2, WCP-3 and WCP-4 class locomotives working on the Central Railway (CR). Thus IR purchased seven 1500 V DC electric locomotives from English Electric and Vulcan Foundry, the latter having previously supplied steam locomotives to India. They were manufactured in England and shipped to India in 1954-1955.

These locomotives were the first mixed class electric locomotive to roam India as well as the first electric locomotive with the Co-Co wheel arrangement. They were also the longest serving non-steam locomotives in India until the arrival of the WCG-2, WCAM-1, WCAM-2, WCM-6, WCAM-3 and WCAG-1 class. Initially the WCM-1 class were known as EM/1 class. They had a distinct appearance, with their large size and round noses. They had their cab doors placed in the middle of the body instead of being near the cab.

The WCM-1 locomotives were used on many express trains such as the Deccan Queen and the Indrayani Express, and as well as on freight duties. In 1968, the placement of the entry doors were moved to near the cab for better practicality. The Deccan Queen had WCM-1 with a matching livery until the 1990s. During that period, the aging WCM-1s began to fail regularly, causing disruption on train services. Thus Central Railways decided to withdraw these locomotives from service by 2000, with only one being preserved.

== Preserved Examples ==
Class	Manufacturer	Loco Number	Previous shed	Name	Livery	Location	ref
WCM-1	Vulcan Foundry and English Electric	20068	Kalyan (KYN)		White/blue with red lining	Preserved at Chennai Rail Museum	

== Former sheds ==
- Pune
- Kalyan (KYN)

All the locomotives of this class has been withdrawn from service.

== See also ==
- Rail transport in India#History
- Indian Railways
- Locomotives of India
- Rail transport in India
