= Indian locomotive class WAG-8 =

Class of Indian locomotives

WAG-8
Type and origin
- Power type: Electric
- Builder: Bharat Heavy Electricals Limited
- Build date: 1990
- Total produced: 1 (possibly 2)
Specifications
- Configuration
  - UIC: Co'-Co'
- Gauge: 5 ft 6 in (1,676 mm)
- Bogies: Alco High-Adhesion bogies
- Wheel diameter: New: 1,029 mm (3 ft 5 in); Half-worn: 1,055 mm (3 ft 5 1/2 in); Full-worn: 1,016 mm (3 ft 4 in)
- Wheelbase: 13,380 mm (43 ft 11 in)
- Length: 19,880 mm (65 ft 3 in)
- Width: 3,000 mm (9 ft 10 in)
- Height: 4,100 mm (13 ft 5 in)
- Axle load: 21.33 tonnes (20.99 long tons; 23.51 short tons)
- Loco weight: 128 tonnes (126 long tons; 141 short tons)
- Electric system/s: 25 kV 50 Hz AC
- Current pickup: Pantographs
- Traction motors: 6 Hitachi HS15250A
- Gear ratio: 16:65
- MU working: 3
- Loco brake: Air and Regenerative
- Train brakes: Air
- Safety systems: TPWS (Train Protection and Warning System), Vacuum Control, Slip/Slide Control, Main Overload Relay, Motor Over Load Relay, No Volt Relay, Over Voltage Protection and Earth Fault Relay, Oil Pressure Governor
Performance figures
- Maximum speed: 100 km/h (62 mph)
- Power output: 5,000 hp (3,700 kW)
- Tractive effort: Starting: 300 kN (67,000 lb_{f})
Career
- Numbers: No IR numbers
- Locale: Inside BHEL yard, Jhansi
- Disposition: Stored

The Indian locomotive class WAG-8 was a class of 25 kV AC electric locomotives that was developed in the early 1990s by Bharat Heavy Electricals Limited (BHEL) for Indian Railways. The model name stands for broad gauge (W), AC current (A), freight/goods traffic (G), eighth-generation (8). Only two units of this class were built, both prototypes.

This class provided the basic design for a number of other locomotives like the WCAM-2, the WCAM-3 and the WCAG-1.

== History ==
The history of WAG-8 begins in the early 1990s with the aim of addressing the shortcomings of the previous WAG-5 class and remove steam locomotives from IR by a target date of 1990. The WAG-5, although successful, had become underpowered to meet the growing demands of the Indian Railways. So in the early 1990s BHEL decided to look for a successor to the WAG-5 class. The required specification was of a 5000-horsepower locomotive.

Initially, Indian Railways invited tenders to build locomotives to the new specification. The following responses were received:

- CLW submitted their upgraded WAG-5 model with 5000 hp with Co-Co bogies.
- BHEL submitted a 5000 hp locomotive with thyristors control and Co-Co bogies

Each company submitted their prototypes and Indian Railways designated these prototypes as the WAG-7 class and WAG-8 class respectively. Development on the WAG-8 class in 1990 while BHEL was also manufacturing WAG-5HS. Technologically the BHEL WAG-8 was meant to be superior to the WAG-7 which was effectively using tap-changer technology from the 1960s. They most likely had the Hitachi HS15250A seen in present-day WCAM-3 and WCAG-1. The WAG-8 locomotives were to be handed over to Railways for trial in December, 1992, but the whole project was cancelled due to arrival of the WAG-9, and thyristors control had become obsolete in favour of 3-phase AC technology. The prototype locomotive was subsequently condemned and parked on an unused rail sliding at BHEL, Jhansi, where it remained as of 2017.

== See also ==
- Rail transport in India#History
- Indian Railways
- Locomotives of India
- Rail transport in India
