= Indian locomotive class WCAM-1 =

Indian Railway class AC and DC mix electric locomotive

WCAM-1
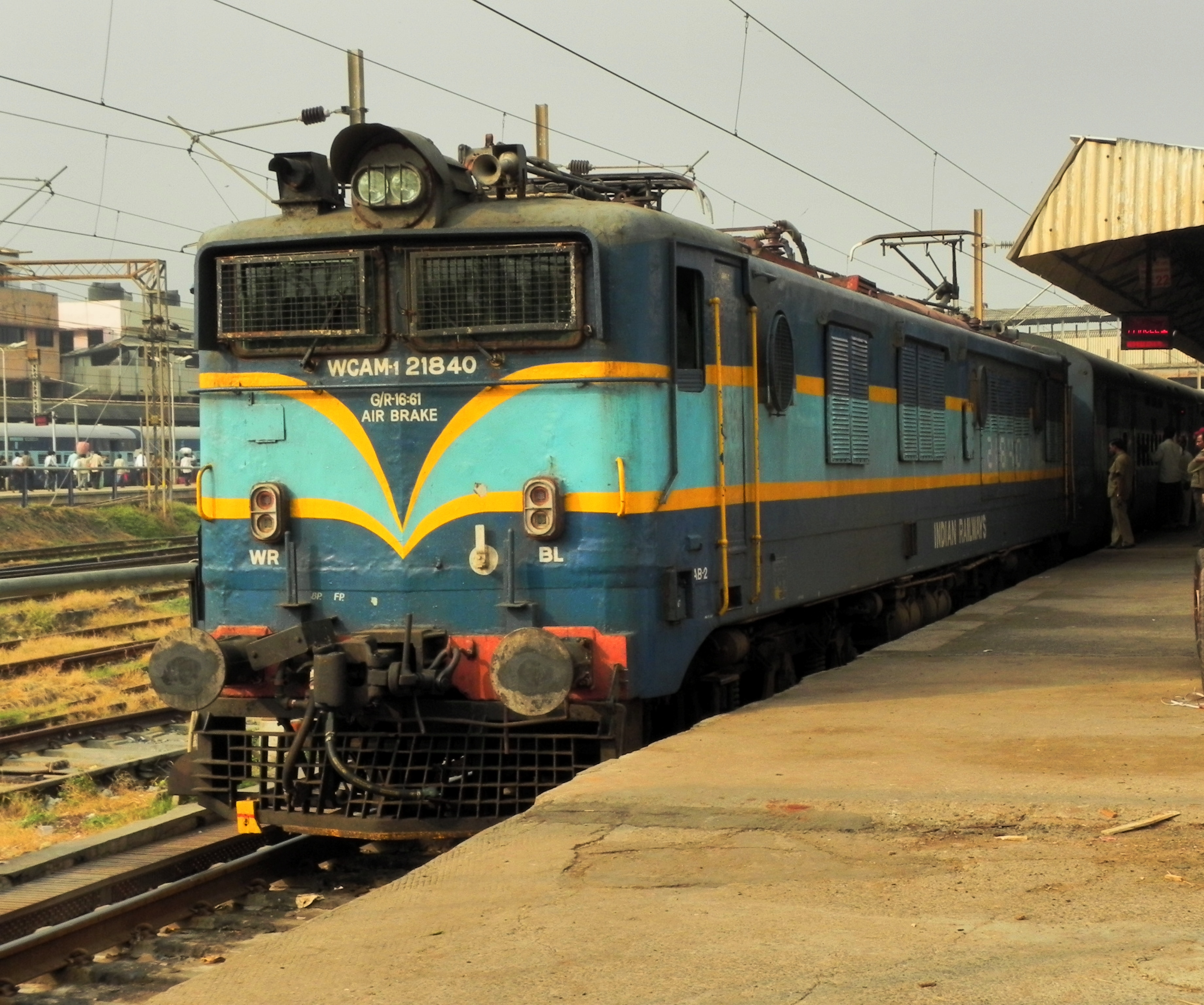
- Pune-based 11095 with the Ahimsa Express.
Type and origin
- Power type: Electric
- Designer: RDSO
- Builder: Chittaranjan Locomotive Works
- Build date: 1973–1979
- Total produced: 53
Specifications
- Configuration
  - AAR: C-C
  - UIC: Co'Co'
  - Commonwealth: Co-Co
- Gauge: 5 ft 6 in (1,676 mm)
- Bogies: ALCo High-Adhesion Tri-mount cast
- Wheel diameter: New: 1,092 mm (3 ft 7 in); Half-worn: 1,055 mm (3 ft 5 1/2 in); Full-worn: 1,016 mm (3 ft 4 in)
- Wheelbase: 14,432 mm (47 ft 4 1/4 in)
- Length
  - Over couplers: 20.950 m (68 ft 8 3/4 in)
  - Over headstocks: 19.680 m (64 ft 6 3/4 in)
- Width: 3.055 m (10 ft 1/4 in)
- Height: 4.121 m (13 ft 6 1/4 in)
- Axle load: 18.8 tonnes (18.5 long tons; 20.7 short tons)
- Loco weight: 112.8 tonnes (111.0 long tons; 124.3 short tons)
- Electric system/s: 25 kV 50 Hz AC; 1.5 kV DC
- Current pickups: Pantograph (a separate one for AC and DC)
- Traction motors: Alstom TAO-659A1
- MU working: Not possible
- Loco brake: Air/Parking
- Train brakes: Vacuum/Air
- Safety systems: Slip Control, Main Overload relay, Motor Overload Relay, Over Voltage relay, Earth fault relay, Low Pressure Governor and Brake Cylinder Cutoff Valve
Performance figures
- Maximum speed: Starting: 100 km/h (62 mph) (DC)/120 km/h (75 mph) (AC); Continuous: 60 km/h (37 mph) (AC)/35 km/h (22 mph) (DC)
- Power output
  - 1 hour: 3,850 hp (2,871 kW) (AC)
  - Continuous: 2,350 hp (1,752 kW) (DC); 3,640 hp (2,714 kW) (AC)
- Tractive effort
  - Starting: 33,840 kgf (331.9 kN; 74,600 lbf) (AC); 23,200 kgf (228 kN; 51,000 lbf) (DC)
  - Continuous: 22,800 kgf (224 kN; 50,000 lbf) (DC); 16,000 kgf (160 kN; 35,000 lbf) (AC)
- Factor of adh.: Dry: 0.3 (AC); 0.25 (DC)
Career
- Operators: Indian Railways
- Numbers: 21800-21852
- Nicknames: Vallabh (No.21800)
- Locale: Western Railway, Central Railway
- First run: 1973
- Last run: 11 May 2015
- Retired: 11 May 2015
- Withdrawn: 11 May 2015
- Preserved: none
- Scrapped: Around mid-2015
- Disposition: All scrapped

The Indian locomotive class WCAM-1 was a class of dual-voltage (25 kV AC and 1.5 kV DC) electric locomotives that was developed in 1973 by Chittaranjan Locomotive Works for Indian Railways. The model name stands for broad gauge (W), DC Current (C), AC Current (A), Mixed traffic (M) locomotive, 1st generation (1). They entered service in March 1973. A total of 53 WCAM-1 were built at CLW between 1973 and 1979, which made them the most numerous class of mainline dual-power AC/DC electric locomotive.

The WCAM-1 was one of the most successful locomotives of Indian Railways, having served both passenger and freight trains for over 40 years between 1973 and 2015. This class was a bi-current version of the WAM-4 class. However, with the advent of new 3-phase locomotives like WAP-5 and WAP-7, the aging fleet of WCAM-1 locomotives were relegated to hauling smaller passenger trains and have been fully withdrawn from mainline duties. All units have been scrapped with no locomotives preserved.

== History ==
The WCAM-1 was a class of locomotive used in the Indian Railways system. They were the first locomotives from the WCAM class. These locos were operational in routes around Mumbai. These locomotives worked on both AC as well as DC as their classification suggested. They hauled trains from DC section of suburban railway to AC section and thus performed a very critical task as they could easily operate on both AC and DC. However they performed poorly in DC mode compared to AC mode but they were very robust and had easy operating and handling characteristics.

These were 1st class of Wide Gauge's (W) Bi-current charged (CA - runs both under AC and DC) and Mixed load series (M - hauls both passenger and freight trains). These were the first electric locomotives to enter Western Railway's Mumbai division; prior to that steam and diesel locomotives used to haul trains in Western Railway's Mumbai division. These brought an end to the steam era in this division. They were also the first locomotives allotted to Valsad (BL) shed. Their top speed under DC was the lowest, as compared to other Bi-current charged locomotives. They were the first Bi-current charged locomotives in the country. Initially all were vacuum braked but were retrofitted with air brakes to make them dual braked. Some also had their vacuum brakes replaced with air brakes. Introduced in 1975. One of the single pantographs on the WCAM-1 is used in DC traction; the other one carries AC current. The two pantographs were not identical, though similar in design. Originally built with vacuum brakes only, although a few (Nos. 21805, 21807, 21812, 21828, 21838, 21844, 21845, and 21850) had both vacuum and air brakes. They lacked dynamic brakes. The WCAM-1 did not use a variable ratio auto-transformer in AC mode like the others; it used a fixed-ratio transformer and rectifier bank to convert the OHE supply to 1500 V DC. The design of the transformers and notches made this a hard machine to operate, with the fusible links tending to blow often. Of the 28 notches, notches 4, 14, 21, and 28 were used for continuous operation, although notch 4 was intended for low-speed shunting and was very ineffective. Notches 14, 21, and 28 were the terminal notches of the series, series-parallel, and parallel circuit notch sequences. In DC mode, the WCAM-1 used resistor banks for speed control. However they were very robust machines and relatively easy in the handling characteristics. WCAM-1's had three traction modes (series, series-parallel, parallel) in both DC and AC mode, but using the parallel mode in DC was discouraged because of power problems. In practice this was not restrictive since series-parallel notches allowed reaching 75 km/h or so. In AC mode, the locos were almost always used with the motors in all-parallel mode. Unlike the WCAM-2 and WCAM-3 locos, no reconfiguration has been carried out to force the use of all-parallel mode with AC. Weak field operation was available. They were briefly tried out for freight use by CR, but all finally ended up with WR. The top ones getting the WCAM-2P (see below). [5/02] However, CR's Indore-Pune weekly train had been hauled by a WR WCAM-1. Max. speed 100 km/h, 110 km/h after regearing. Traction motors were nose-suspended and axle-hung.

Also during 1992-1996, the WCAM-1 was occasionally used on express trains on the Bombay division of Central Railway (along with WCG-2 and WDM-2) due to the aging failure of WCM locomotives. When WCAM-3 entered service in 1997, the WCAM-1 was brought back to Western Railway, while WCG-2 was transferred back to freight duties over CR Bombay division and WDM-2 was transferred to Konkan Railway duties.

Then, the WCAM-1 continued duties over the Mumbai–Ahmedabad line of the Western Railway for another 15-18 years. After the entire Western line section was converted to AC traction on 5 February 2012, those locos were aging, meaning they would've ended their coal life. The first unit of this class, #21800, was withdrawn from service on 10 April 2012, while the last one, #21852, was withdrawn from service on 11 May 2015. Since then, all units of this class have been scrapped with no locomotives preserved.

== Technical specifications ==
Of all the 30 notches, 1-21 were DC notches allowing series operation of traction motors. Rest of the 8 notches allow series-parallel combination under DC. Under AC, the combinations were 3S-2P and 2S-3P. These locomotives could run in parallel combination but it was discouraged due to power problems under DC. Under AC, the locomotives were run under parallel notches nearly always. Although these engines were not rebuilt to use only parallel combination under AC. Field weakening of traction motors was possible at 21st and 30th notches. Voltage control was done by Tap changer operation under AC and Resistance notching under DC. Traction motors were charged by DC. Its prototypes were tested in the year 1971.

Traction Motors	Alstom/CLW TAO 659 A1 2,800 kg (6,200 lb). Axle-hung, nose-suspended and force ventilated. Temperature rise by resistance in Armature - 140 degrees Celsius (284 degrees Fahrenheit)/Field - 160 °C (320 °F). Coil resistance at 110 °C (230 °F) in Armature - 0.0151 ohms/Main pole - 0.0145 ohms/Interpole - 0.0078 ohms. Starting current - 1100 A. 1 hour rating - 798 hp (595 kW), 750 V, 870 A and 1070 RPM. Continuous rating - 585 kW (784 hp), 550 V, 840 A and 1095 RPM. Air gap in main pole - 5.5 mm (0.217 in)/Interpole - 6 mm (0.236 in). Grade of brushes - EG 367, 6 brush holders and 3 brush per holder
Gear Ratio	61:16, 58:21
Transformer	BHEL made BOT 34600. 11,500 kg (25,400 lb), Forced Oil cooling, Class 'A' insulation and 32 taps. Primary rating - 3646 kVA, 22.5 kV and 162 A. Secondary rating - 3460 kVA, 1730 V (DC) and 2x1000 A (DC). Tertiary rating - 274 kVA, 1470 V and 186 A
Silicon Rectifiers	48 cells (321 UFR200) per bridge. Continuous rating - 1000 A each cubicle. 1 hour rating - 1270 V. Max starting current - 1650 A. Forced air cooling.
Pantographs	Faiveley AM-12 (AC) and Faiveley AM-18B (DC)
Bogie Drive Arrangement	Gear pinion
Auxiliaries	2 Headlights (750 W and 32 V). Lead Acid battery (50 cells), Rating - 110 V and 5 hours.
Motor-Alternator Set	SOA-749 Alternator by Kirloskar Group (180 kVA, 400 V, 270 A, 1500 RPM and 3 phase). AY100AZ Motor by AEI (2,106 hp or 1,570 kW, 1500 RPM, 1400 V and 136 A continuous).
Number of sand boxes	16
Main Starting Resistance blower	Four PETA-60 types by SF Product (11,400 m^{3}/h or 400,000 cu ft/h). ILA2-116.2 type Motor by Siemens(9.3 kW or 12 hp, 400 V, 18 A and 2925 RPM).
Auxiliary Rectifier	Rating with 2 bridges in parallel - 180 A (Continuous) and 1000 A (5 seconds)/1 bridge - 90 A (Continuous), 140 A (30 minutes) and 900 A (2 seconds). Natural Air cooling. Twenty four 324-UFR200 type cells connected by bridges.
2EC388 type Compressor by Kirloskar	Rating - 792 L/min (174 imp gal/min; 209 US gal/min) at 7 kg/cm^{2} (100 psi). Motor - 7.5 kW or 10 hp, 38 V, 15 A and 1390 RPM.
2 Exhausters by Gresham and Craven	Northey-250RE type. Two 385 V motors.
2 Traction Motor Blowers by SF Product	MLBRX-42.5-1-H4 type (16,200 m^{3}/h or 570,000 cu ft/h). 2 Motors by Siemens(22 kW (30 hp), 385 V, 41 A and 3000 RPM).
PFTA-50 Arr 6 type Smoothing Reaction Blower by SF Product	Capacity - 4,200 m^{3}/h (150,000 cu ft/h). Motor - 2.2 hp (2 kW), 380 V and 2860 RPM
MLBR-60-1-H2 type Oil Cooler Blower by SF Product	Capacity - 22,200 m^{3}/h (29,000 cuyd/h). Motor - 22 kW (30 hp), 380 V, 43 A and 1470 RPM
2 Silicon Rectifier Blowers by SF Product	PHMX-40-6 type (3,400 m^{3}/h or 120,000 cu ft/h). 2 Motors - 2 kW (3 hp), 380 V, 4.4 A and 2860 RPM.
Oil Pump by Best and Company Private Limited	Capacity - 750 L/min (160 imp gal/min; 200 US gal/min) Motor - 3.3 kW (4 hp), 380 V, 66 A and 2865 RPM
SL-42 type Smoothing Reactor	Rating - 1250 V and 950 A. 0.00718 ohms resistance at 110 °C (230 °F).
Notches	Total 30

== Locomotive shed ==
All 53 WCAM-1s were based at Valsad Electric Loco Shed in Gujarat, and were withdrawn from service after the conversion of entire Mumbai region into AC traction.

== Trains Hauled by WCAM-1 ==
The WCAM-1 were employed on all express trains, including Shatabdi and Rajdhani Express (till Vadodara), until AC electrification of Mumbai area. The arrival of WCAM-2P engines did not reduce their work loads. Later on, with introduction of more modern AC locomotives and need for faster trains, the WCAM-1s were relegated to secondary passenger trains, including:

- Mumbai Central - Ahmedabad Junction Passenger
- Valsad - Bandra Terminus express
- Valsad - Viramgam Passenger
- Bharuch - Virar Passenger
- Valsad Fast Passenger
- Bandra Terminus Vapi Passenger
- Ahmedabad Passenger
- Surat - Virar Shuttle
- Ahmedabad - Valsad Passenger

These trains were being hauled by the WCAM-1 locomotives, before their final retirement in 2015.

== Performance ==
Following is the capacity of WCAM-1 locomotive with gear ratio 16:61 under AC for 4 wheeler wagons (in tonnes) :-

Grade\km/h	Start	20	30	40	50	60	70	80
Level	6000+	6000+	6000+	6000+	6000+	5950	4530	3380
1 in 500	6000+	6000+	5850	4880	3640	3325	2675	2100
1 in 200	2900	2900	2900	2735	2100	1970	1630	1310
1 in 150	2250	2250	2250	2185	1690	1595	1330	1080
1 in 100	1535	1535	1535	1535	1195	1145	960	780
1 in 50	965	925	915	795	610	-	-	-

Following is the capacity of WCAM-1 locomotive with a gear ratio of 16:61 under AC for BOX wagons (in tonnes):-

Grade\km/h	Start	20	30	40	50	60	70	80
Level	6000+	6000+	6000+	6000+	6000+	6000+	6000+	5675
1 in 500	4300	4300	4300	4300	4300	4160	3460	2820
1 in 200	2975	2975	2975	2975	2340	2245	1900	1570
1 in 150	2530	2530	2530	2360	1845	1775	1505	1250
1 in 100	1945	1910	1880	1635	1275	1235	1050	870
1 in 50	1120	950	940	815	630	615	-	-

Following is the capacity of WCAM-1 locomotive with gear ratio 16:61 under AC for ICF coaches (in tonnes):-

Grade\km/h	Start	20	30	40	50	60	70	80	90	100	110	120
Level	1500+	1500+	1500+	1500+	1500+	1500+	1500+	1500+	1500+	1500+	1500+	1340
1 in 500	1500+	1500+	1500+	1500+	1500+	1500+	1500+	1500+	1500+	1500+	1200	885
1 in 200	1500+	1500+	1500+	1500+	1500+	1500+	1500+	1445	1175	995	760	565
1 in 150	1500+	1500+	1500+	1500+	1500+	1500+	1400	1175	960	815	625	465
1 in 100	1500+	1500+	1500+	1500+	1295	1175	995	840	690	590	450	330
1 in 50	1165	970	955	840	655	595	505	435	345	290	215	145

Following is the capacity of WCAM-1 locomotive with a gear ratio of 16:61 under AC for BOXN wagons (in tonnes):-

Grade\km/h	Start	20	30	40	50	60	70	80
Level	6000+	6000+	6000+	6000+	6000+	6000+	6000+	6000+
1 in 500	5015	5015	5015	5015	4900	4340	3600	2980
1 in 200	3305	3305	3305	3225	2530	2295	1945	1645
1 in 150	2770	2770	2770	2515	1980	1805	1535	1300
1 in 100	2085	1990	1960	1730	1365	1250	1070	905
1 in 50	1165	980	975	860	670	615	525	440

Following is the capacity of WCAM-1 locomotive with gear ratio 16:61 under DC for 4 wheeler wagons (in tonnes):-

Grade\km/h	Start	20	30	40	50	60	70	80
Level	6000+	6000+	6000+	6000+	6000+	4300	2800	1815
1 in 500	4710	4710	4710	4710	3640	2390	1635	1110
1 in 200	2470	2470	2470	2470	2100	1400	980	675
1 in 150	1900	1900	1900	1900	1690	1125	790	545
1 in 100	1390	1390	1390	1390	1195	800	555	-
1 in 50	875	875	875	875	610	-	-	-

Following is the capacity of WCAM-1 locomotive fitted with TAO659A1 with a gear ratio of 16:61 under DC for BOX wagons (in tonnes):-

Grade\km/h	Start	20	30	40	50	60	70	80
Level	5100	5100	5100	5100	5100	5100	4500	3045
1 in 500	3950	3950	3950	3950	3950	2980	2115	1490
1 in 200	2700	2700	2700	2700	2340	1590	1140	805
1 in 150	2310	2310	2310	2310	1845	1255	895	630
1 in 100	1770	1770	1770	1635	1275	865	610	-
1 in 50	1020	950	940	815	630	-	-	-

Following is the capacity of WCAM-1 locomotive with gear ratio 16:61 under DC for ICF coaches (in tonnes):-

Grade\km/h	Start	20	30	40	50	60	70	80	90	100
Level	1500+	1500+	1500+	1500+	1500+	1500+	1500+	1500+	1380	1040
1 in 500	1500+	1500+	1500+	1500+	1500+	1500+	1500+	1135	810	630
1 in 200	1500+	1500+	1500+	1500+	1500+	1450	965	660	475	370
1 in 150	1500+	1500+	1500+	1500+	1500+	1040	770	525	375	290
1 in 100	1500+	6000+	6000+	6000+	1215	785	535	360	250	190
1 in 50	1050	960	930	805	610	380	245	150	95	60

Following is the capacity of WCAM-1 locomotive fitted with TAO659 with a gear ratio of 16:61 under DC for BOX wagons (in tonnes):-

Grade\km/h	Start	20	30	40	50	60	70	80
Level	6000+	6000+	6000+	6000+	6000+	6000+	4540	2970
1 in 500	4545	4545	4545	4545	4545	2980	2050	1410
1 in 200	2995	2995	2995	2995	2375	1560	1085	750
1 in 150	2505	2505	2505	2415	1855	1220	845	585
1 in 100	1885	1885	1885	1660	1275	835	575	390
1 in 50	1080	970	945	820	625	395	255	160

Following is the capacity of WCAM-1 locomotive with a gear ratio of 21:58 under AC for ICF coaches (in tonnes):-

Grade\km/h	Start	20	30	40	50	60	70	80	90	100	110	120
Level	1500+	1500+	1500+	1500+	1500+	1500+	1500+	1500+	1500+	1500+	1500+	1500+
1 in 500	1500+	1500+	1500+	1500+	1500+	1500+	1500+	1500+	1500+	1500+	1300	1070
1 in 200	1500+	1500+	1500+	1500+	1500+	1435	1360	1295	1175	985	830	695
1 in 150	1500+	1330	1290	1245	1195	1145	1095	1050	960	805	680	575
1 in 100	1470	905	880	855	830	800	775	745	690	580	490	410
1 in 50	810	420	415	405	400	390	380	370	345	285	240	195

Following is the capacity of WCAM-1 locomotive with gear ratio 21:58 under DC for ICF coaches (in tonnes):-

Grade\km/h	Start	20	30	40	50	60	70	80	90	100
Level	1500+	1500+	1500+	1500+	1500+	1500+	1500+	1500+	1500+	1290
1 in 500	1500+	1500+	1500+	1500+	1500+	1500+	1500+	1135	1155	790
1 in 200	1500+	1500+	1500+	1500+	1500+	1500+	1335	990	690	475
1 in 150	1500+	1500+	1500+	1500+	+1500	1325	1075	800	555	190
1 in 100	1285	1350	1315	1285	1180	930	760	560	390	260
1 in 50	700	660	650	640	590	460	370	265	170	100

== See also ==
- Locomotives of India
- Rail transport in India
- Indian Railways
- Indian locomotive class WCAM-2
- Indian locomotive class WCAM-3
- Indian locomotive class WCAG-1
