= Electric Loco Shed, Jhansi =

Loco shed in Uttar Pradesh, India

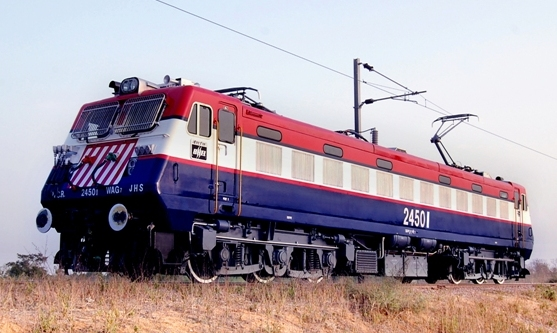
- JHS based WAG-7 at BHEL yard Jhansi.

- Location within Uttar Pradesh

Location
- Location: Jhansi, Uttar Pradesh
- Coordinates: 25°26′38″N 78°33′12″E

Characteristics
- Owner: Indian Railways
- Operator: North Central Railway zone
- Depot code: JHS
- Type: Engine shed
- Rolling stock: WAP-4; WAG-5; WAG-7; WAG-9

History
- Opened: 1987; 39 years ago

Electric Loco Shed, Jhansi is a motive power depot performing locomotive maintenance and repair facility for electric locomotives of the Indian Railways, located at Jhansi of the North Central Railway zone in Uttar Pradesh, India.

== Operation ==
Being one of the electric engine sheds in North Central Railway, various major and minor maintenance schedules of electric locomotives are carried out here. It has the sanctioned capacity of 150 engine units. Beyond the operating capacity, this shed houses a total of 215 engine units, including 38 WAP-4, 117 WAG-5 and 65 WAG-7. Like all locomotive sheds, JHS does regular maintenance, overhaul and repair including painting and washing of locomotives.

== Locomotives ==
Serial No.	Locomotive Class	Horsepower	Quantity
1	WAP-4	5050	38
2	WAG-5	3850	86
3	WAG-7	5500	133
4	WAG-9	6120	80
Total locomotives active as of April 2026			337
