= BHEL Jhansi =

Factory in Uttar Pradesh, India

Coordinates: 25.324°N 78.526°E

Bharat Heavy Electricals Limited
- Industry: Electrical equipment
- Founded: 1974
- Headquarters: New Delhi, India
- Area served: India and presence in 70 countries
- Key people: Sh. Koppu Sadashiv Murthy (Chairman & MD)
- Revenue: ₹433,799 million (US$4.5 billion)(2010–2011)
- Net income: ₹60,110 million (US$630 million)(2010–2011)
- Total assets: ₹125,514 million (US$1.3 billion)(2010–2011)
- Number of employees: 46,274 (2010)
- Website: jhs.bhel.com/index_en.php

Bharat Heavy Electricals Limited, Jhansi is a factory and township in Uttar Pradesh, India. It was founded on 9 January 1974 and is one of the 17 manufacturing units of the Bharat Heavy Electricals Limited (BHEL) Corporation. It is located on NH-44, 15 km south of Jhansi city. The Jhansi unit is spread in 1,064 acres (431 ha), which includes 519 acres (210 ha) of township having large green cover and excellent amenities.

BHEL Jhansi started production of transformers in 1976. BHEL Jhansi has two product groups: transformers and locomotives. Marketing of products and services is done at the corporate level by Power sector, Industry sector, International operation division and regional office divisions spread all over India.

BHEL Jhansi has received the CII Exim bank award of "Strong Commitment to Excel" in the year 2007 in the field of Business Excellence.

== Organisation ==
The BHEL Jhansi unit is led by the executive director, Shri Vinay Nigam, who reports to the chairman and managing director. The organisation is governed by corporate policies including human resources, procurement and finance. The operations of BHEL Jhansi are monitored by the BHEL corporate management committee.

== Products ==
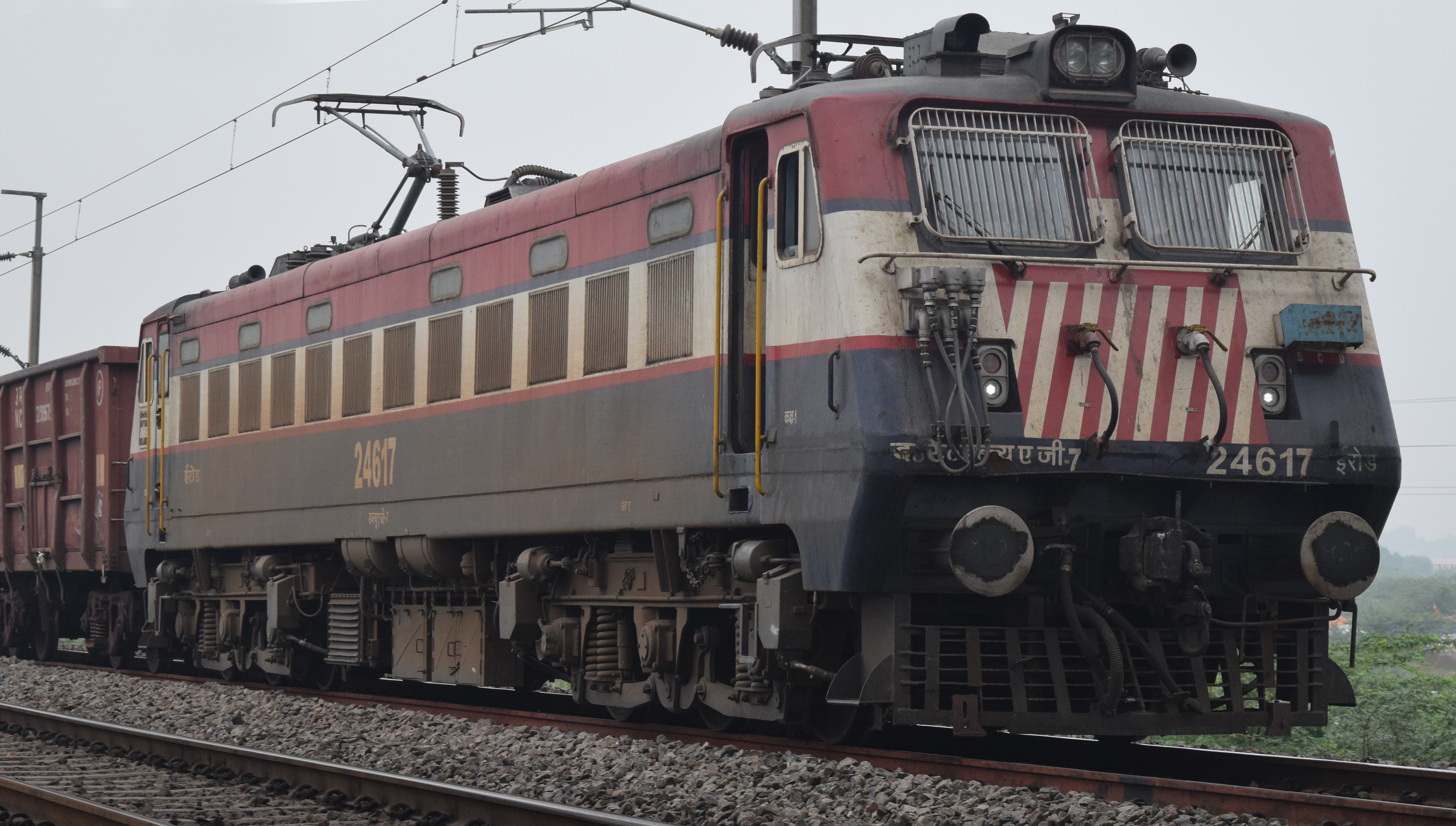
BHEL Jhansi made WAG7 of Erode loco shed hauling freight

- Transformers − Power Transformers up to 400 kV class/Traction trfr/ESP trfr./Special trfr/Dry TypeTrfr./Inst trfr up to 400 kV class and voltage transformer and current transformers are also produced.
- Locomotives − WAG 7 AC locomotive for Indian railway/diesel locos. all application 3300 hp/wagons up to 300 MT 27 axle/railway track equipment/metro for kolkatta/emu coaches.

== Workforce ==
BHEL Jhansi has a committed workforce of 1030 employees. All employees have technical and professional background to suit the operations. Skilled and experienced manpower is major strength of organisation along with engineering and R&D strength. It also has around 1200 contract workers to cater to the support services.

Workers have recognised union and supervisors have their registered association. To safeguard interest of SCs/STs, a registered SC/ST association is in place.

== Certifications and recognition ==
BHEL Jhansi has been certified for ISO 9001:2001 for Quality Assurance.
