= Indian locomotive class WCM-6 =

Electric locomotives, developed 1995

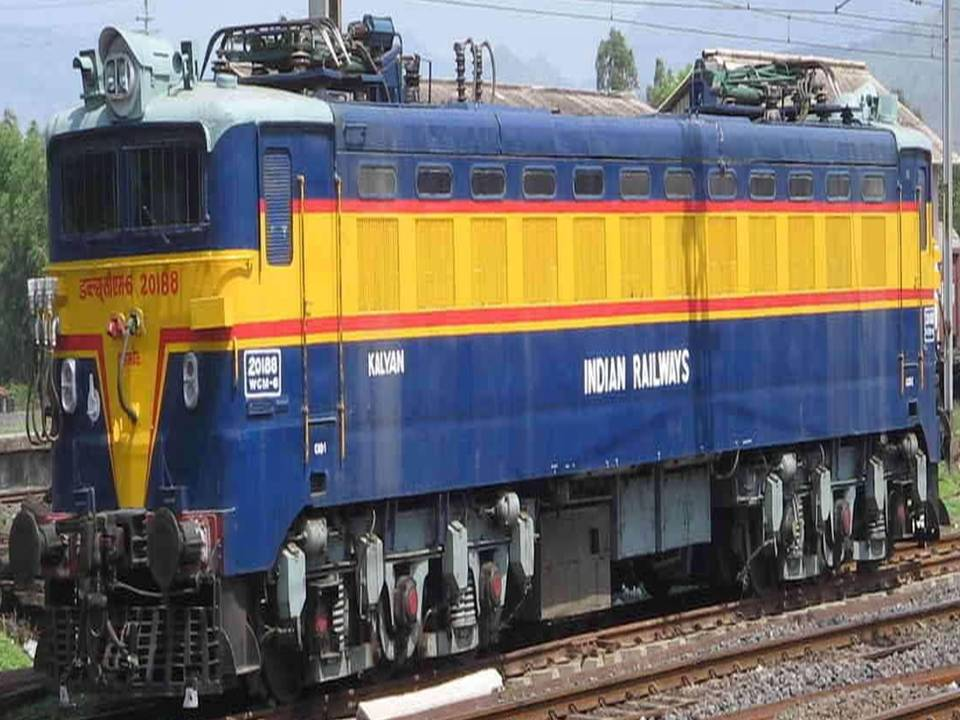
- Kalyan based WCM-6.
Type and origin
- Power type: Electric
- Designer: CLW
- Builder: CLW
- Build date: 1995
- Total produced: 2
- Rebuilder: Bhusuval workshop
- Rebuild date: 2008–08–28
- Number rebuilt: 2
Specifications
- Configuration
  - AAR: C-C
  - UIC: Co′Co′
  - Commonwealth: Co-Co
- Gauge: 5 ft 6 in (1,676 mm)
- Bogies: High Adhesion Bogies
- Wheel diameter: New: 1,092 mm (3 ft 7 in), Half worn: 1,055 mm (3 ft 5 1/2 in) and Full worn: 1,016 mm (3 ft 4 in)
- Wheelbase: 1,900 mm (6 ft 3 in)
- Length
  - Over couplers: 20.394 m (66 ft 10 15/16 in)
  - Over body: 19.000 m (62 ft 4 1/16 in)
- Width: 3.179 m (10 ft 5 3/16 in)
- Height: 4.255 m (13 ft 11 1/2 in)
- Frame type: High Adhesion fabricated frame
- Axle load: 20.0 tonnes (19.7 long tons; 22.0 short tons)
- Loco weight: 120.00 tonnes (118.10 long tons; 132.28 short tons)
- Sandbox cap.: 16 sandboxes each
- Power supply: 110 V DC
- Electric system/s: 1.5 kV DC Overhead; After conversion: 25 kV AC Overhead
- Current pickup: Pantograph
- Traction motors: 6 HS-15250A
  - Rating 1 hour: 960A
  - Continuous: 960A
- Gear ratio: 18:64
- MU working: 2 or 3
- Loco brake: Air/Hand,
- Train brakes: Vacuum and Air
- Compressor: 1000 litre/min
- Safety systems: Slip control, Over voltage relay, No volt relay, Low pressure governor, Vacuum governor Train parting alarms, and Brake cylinder cutoff valve
- Couplers: CBC
Performance figures
- Maximum speed: 105 km/h (65 mph) (later reduced to 65 km/h (40 mph))
- Power output: Max: 4,600 hp (3,430 kW)
- Tractive effort
  - Starting: 39,600 kgf (390 kN)
  - 1 hour: 36,000 kgf (350 kN)
  - Continuous: 27,000 kgf (260 kN)
- Factor of adh.: 0.27
Career
- Operators: Indian Railways
- Numbers: 20187 and 20188
- Official name: Vikram (for first locomotive)
- Locale: Central Railways
- Delivered: 1996
- First run: 1996
- Last run: 2008 (as DC locomotives)
- Current owner: Indian Railways
- Disposition: Both in service as AC locomotives, as of 2023

The Indian locomotive class WCM-6 is a class of 1.5 kV DC electric locomotives that was developed in 1995 by Chittaranjan Locomotive Works (CLW) for Indian Railways. The model name stands for broad gauge (W), Direct Current (C), Mixed traffic (M) engine, 6th generation (6). They entered service in 1996. A total of 2 WCM-6 locomotives was built at CLW in 1995. Currently they are used on departmental trains and shunting duties.

== History ==
The history of WCM-6 begins in the early 1990s with the stated aim of the Indian Railways (IR) to remove the aging fleet of WCM class locomotives working in the Central Railway zone (CR). So IR to procure two 1,500 V DC electric locomotives from Chittaranjan Locomotive Works (CLW), who also previously supplied the WCM-5 class. They had high adhesion bogies used in the WAG-7 class AC locomotive.

The two WCM-6s were manufactured in India in 1995. Not counting the dual-voltage WCAM/WCAG series, they were one of only two classes of DC locomotives to have a "boxcab" body style, the other being the WCG-2 class of 1970.

On 28 August 2008, both WCM-6s were converted to work on 25 kV AC by the Electric Locomotives Works of Bhusawal, but retained their WCM-6 designation. Both locomotives are based at Kalyan depot, and are in inferior service as of March 2026.

== Locomotive shed ==
Zone	Name	Shed Code	Quantity
Central Railway	Kalyan ELS and Kalyan DLS	KYNE	2
Total Locomotives Active as of July 2026			2

=== Former sheds ===
- Ajni
- Bhusuwal (BSL)

== See also ==
- Rail transport in India § History
- Indian Railways
- Locomotives of India
- Rail transport in India
