= Electric Loco Shed, Kalyan =

Loco shed in Maharashtra, India

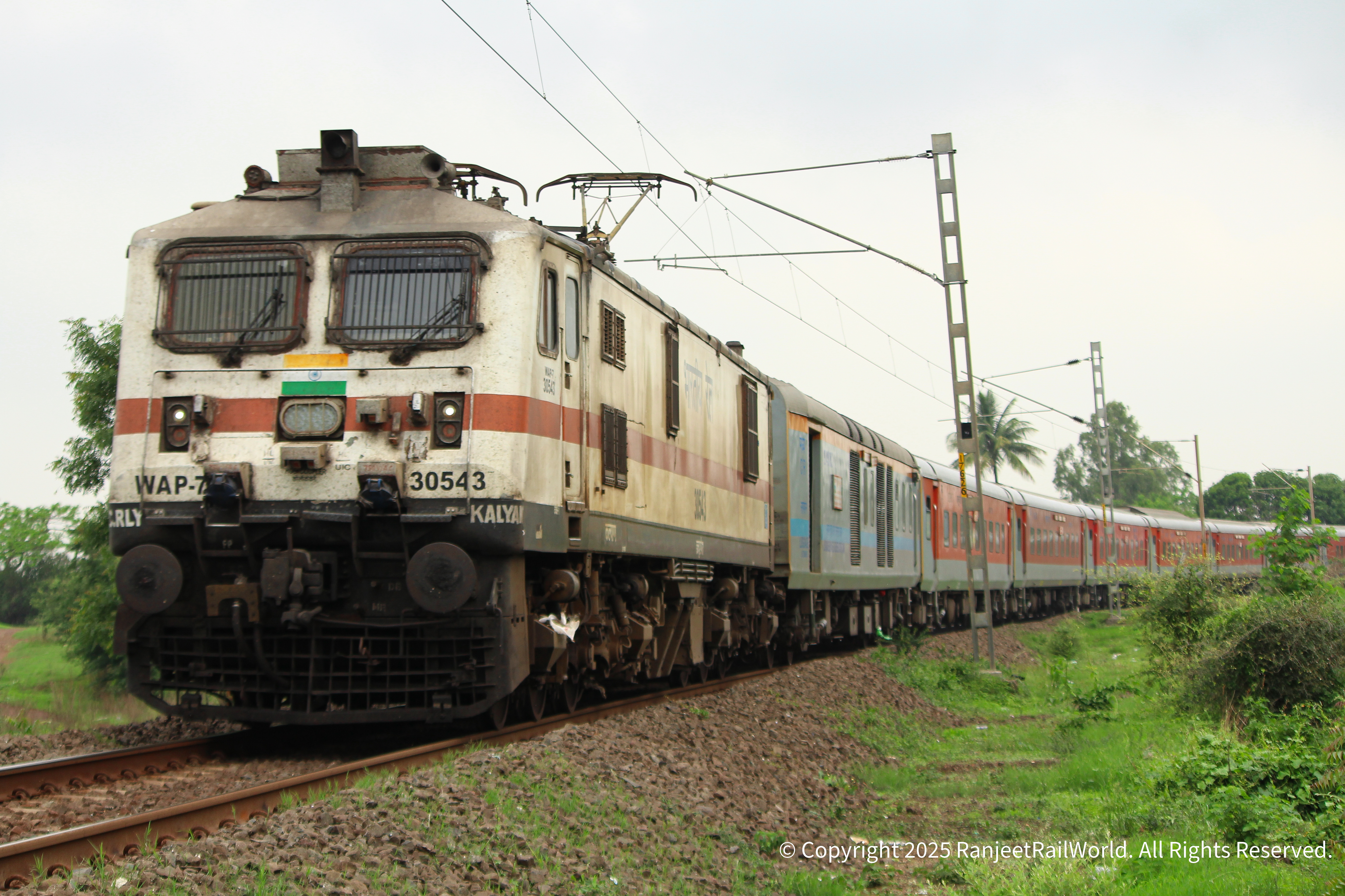
- Kalyan based WAP-7 hauling NZM - CSMT Rajdhani Express.

- Location within Maharashtra

Location
- Location: Kalyan, Thane district Maharashtra
- Coordinates: 19.23525°N 73.1305°E

Characteristics
- Owner: Indian Railways
- Operator: Central Railway zone
- Depot code: KYN
- Type: Electric engine shed
- Rolling stock: WAP-5; WAP-7; WAG-7; WAG-9; WCAM-2; WCAM-3/WAG-7M; WCAG-1; WCM-6

History
- Opened: 28 November 1928; 97 years ago

Electric Loco Shed, Kalyan is an electric engine shed located in Kalyan in the Indian state of Maharashtra. Located north-east of Kalyan Junction railway station, it falls under the Mumbai CR railway division.

== History ==
Electric Loco Shed Kalyan has the distinction of being the prime mover of Mumbai Division of central railway for the last 93 years. The shed was established on 28 November 1928 under Great Indian Peninsula Railway & is the first Electric Loco Shed in India. Kalyan Electric Loco Shed is the latest electric loco shed on Central Railway to house the pure AC electric locomotives due to the shed being under 1500 V DC catenary. It is also the only shed in India to hold widest variety of locos. Currently shed handles 225 locos includes 50 Nos. of WCAM-3, 20 Nos. of WCAM-2, 12 Nos. of WCAG-1, 55 Nos. of WAG-7, 2 Nos. of WCM-6, 69 Nos. of WAG-9, 78 Nos. of WAP-7 respectively. It formerly held the WCG-2 DC electric locomotives.

== Activities ==
Apart from regular Preventive Maintenance Schedule i.e. IA, IB, IC, TOH & IOH, Kalyan Loco Shed is also carrying out the following activities.

1. Maintenance & operation of Accident Relief Train
2. Maintenance & operation of Self Propelled ART
3. Re-discing of wheel sets.

== Milestones ==
1928	Establishment of First Electric Loco Shed at Kalyan on 28-11-1928 in India.
1955	07 Nos. WCM/1 class Locomotives (Make – English Electric) inducted into service on 01-08-1955
1960	02 Nos. WCM/2 class Locomotives (Make – English Electric) & 03 Nos. WCM/3 Class (Make – Hitachi Japan) Locomotives inducted into service on 01-08-1960
1961	07 Nos. WCM/4 class Locomotives (Make–Hitachi Japan) commissioned on 20-10-1961
1963	First Electric Locomotive manufactured in India at CLW dedicated to Nation by then Prime Minister of India Pandit Jawaharlal Nehru, & named as “LOKMANYA”. 21 Nos. WCM/5 class Locomotives commissioned during 1963-65
1967	12 Nos. WCM/2 class Locomotives (after modification from 3000 Volts to 1500 Volts) commissioned on 15-03-1967
1971	57 Nos. WCG/2 Class Locomotives (Make – CLW India) commissioned during 1971–77.
1996	02 Nos. WCM-6 Class Locomotives (Make–CLW India) commissioned on 05-07-1996.
1996	Under the plan of conversion of DC Traction to AC Traction, Kalyan Loco Shed received 53 Nos. WCAM-3 Class AC/DC Locomotives (Make – BHEL, India) & commissioned during 1996–1998. Use of Static Inverter Unit on Locomotives started for the first time on Indian Railway
1999	12 Nos. WCAG-1 Class AC/DC Locomotives (make–BHEL, India) Commissioned on 24-06-1999
2003	New RR Shed (06 Pit) commissioned for AC Locomotives.
2004	SPARMV (Self Propelled Accident Relief Medical Van) commissioned at ELS Kalyan.
2010	Shed OHE converted from 1500 V DC to 25 kV AC on 07-06-2010.
2008 to 2011	50 Nos. WAG-7 Type locomotives (Make – CLW, India) received from ELS BSL, AQ & BIA. These locos are working as Banker in NE & SE Ghat Section under 25 KV AC Catenary.
2012	20 Nos. WCAM-2 Class AC/DC Locomotives (make – BHEL, India) received from ELS / BL. These locos are working on Mail/Express Service.
2013	First WAG-9 loco received from CLW and commissioned at ELS / KYN on 02-02-2013. Total 18 locomotives received and commissioned during 2013.
2014	23 Nos. WAG-9 three Phase Locomotives (make – CLW, India) received and commissioned.
2015	22 Nos. WAG-9 three Phase Locomotives (make – CLW, India) received and commissioned.
2016	1. 07 Nos. WAG-9 Three Phase Locomotives (make – CLW, India) received and commissioned.; 2. WAG-9 Maintenance activities were shifted to new building
2018	1. !0 Nos. of WAG-9 Three Phase Locos. (4 nos. from BHEL & 6 nos. from CLW, India) received and commissioned.; 2. New HS-SPART (High Speed Self Propelled Accident Relief Train) ICF make is commissioned.
2019	13 Nos. of WAG-9 Three Phase Locos are received and commissioned. 12 Nos. of WAP-7 received from ELS AQ and ELS GZB for push pull operation. 05 nos. of WAG-7 locos received from ELS-AQ. 20 Nos. of WAG-9 locos transferred to GMO and LDH. The holding of ELS KYN as on dt. is 223 locos

== Locomotives ==
Serial No.	Locomotive Class	Horsepower	Quantity
1.	WAP-5	6120	8
2.	WAP-7	6350	83
3.	WAG-7	5350	68
4.	WAG-7M	5350	46
5.	WCAM-2	4720	12
6.	WCAM-3	5350	6
7.	WCAG-1	5000	12
8.	WCM-6	4600	2
9.	WAG-9	6120	2
Total Locomotives Active as of April 2026			239
