= Indian locomotive class WCG-2 =

WCG-2
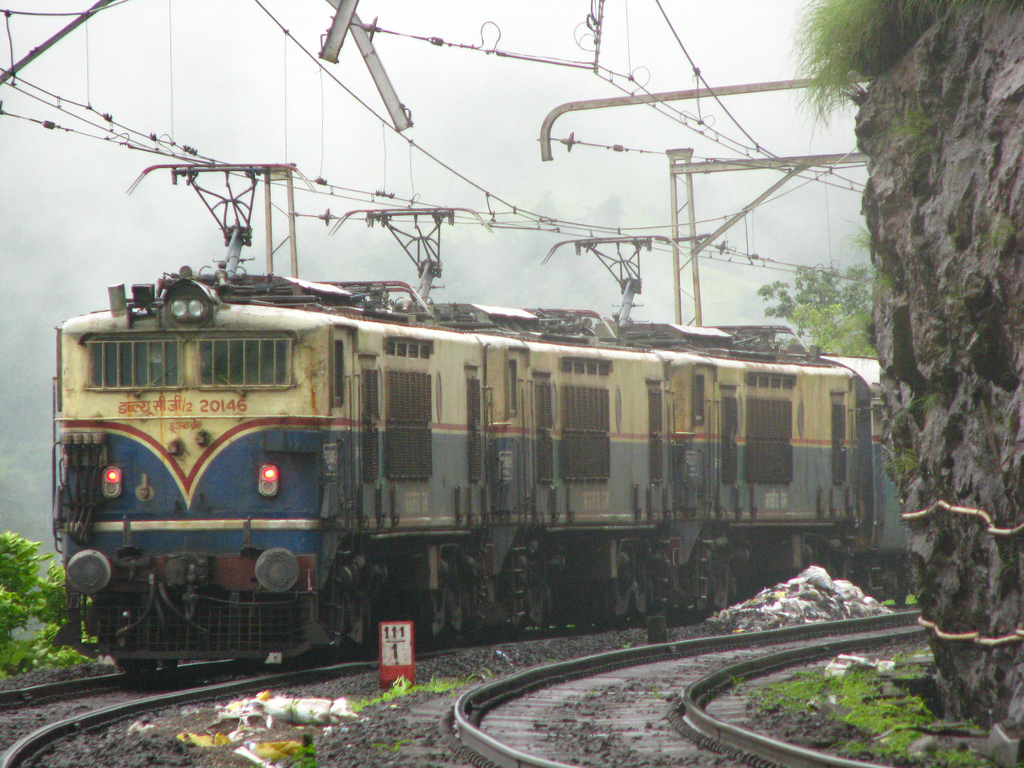
- WCG2 triplets Banking near Bhor Ghats
Type and origin
- Power type: Electric
- Builder: Chittaranjan Locomotive Works
- Build date: 1970–1976
- Total produced: 57
Specifications
- Configuration
  - UIC: Co′Co′
- Gauge: 5 ft 6 in (1,676 mm)
- Bogies: ALCO Asymmetric cast frame trimount
- Wheel diameter: New:1,092 mm (3 ft 7 in), Half worn:1,055 mm (3 ft 5 1/2 in) and Full worn:1,016 mm (3 ft 4 in)
- Length: 18.68 m (61 ft 3 7/16 in)
- Width: 3.055 m (10 ft 1/4 in)
- Height: 4.238 m (13 ft 10 7/8 in)
- Axle load: 21.5 tonnes (21.2 long tons; 23.7 short tons)
- Loco weight: 132 tonnes (130 long tons; 146 short tons)
- Electric system/s: 1.5 kV DC Overhead
- Current pickup: pantograph
- Traction motors: Heil TM4939AZ
- MU working: 3
- Loco brake: Air/Hand
- Train brakes: Air, Dual and Vacuum
- Safety systems: Slip control, Over voltage relay, No volt relay, Earth fault relay, Low pressure governor, Train parting alarms, and Brake cylinder cutoff valve
Performance figures
- Maximum speed: 90 km/h (56 mph)>or80 km/h (50 mph)
- Power output: Max:4,200 hp (3,130 kW)
- Tractive effort: Starting:35,600 kgf (350 kN); Continuous:33,600 kgf (330 kN)
- Factor of adh.: 0.32
Career
- Operators: Indian Railways
- Numbers: 20104-20160
- Nicknames: Howlers
- Locale: Central Railways
- Last run: May 2, 2010 (Mainline operations) May 8, 2012 (Shunting)
- Retired: August, 2012
- Preserved: 20108 - at CLW Loco Park, 20158 - at CSMT Heritage Gully
- Scrapped: August, 2012
- Disposition: Two preserved, remainder scrapped

The Indian locomotive class WCG-2 (colloquially also known as Howlers due to very noisy blowers by Railfans) is a class of 1.5 kV DC electric locomotives that was developed in the late 1960s by Research Design and Standards Organisation (RDSO) and Chittaranjan Locomotive Works (CLW) for Indian Railways. The model name stands for broad gauge (W), DC Current (C), Goods traffic (G) engine, 2nd generation (2). They entered service in February 1971. A total of 57 WCG-2 were built at CLW between 1978 and 1983, which made them the most numerous class of DC electric locomotive.

The WCG-2 was one of the most successful locomotives of Indian Railwayshaving served both passenger and freight trains for over 40 years. They were famously known for doing passenger duties and banking duties in the Bhor and Thull ghats. However, with the advent of new 3-phase locomotives and conversion of Central Railways to 25 kV AC, the WCG-2 locomotives were withdrawn from mainline duties, with two of the locomotives being preserved.

== History ==
=== Background ===
In 1928–29, the then British GIPR decided to progressively electrify the Bombay-Igatpuri and Bombay-Pune sections of Central Railway with direct current (D.C.) electric traction. Thus 57 D.C electric locomotives (41 WCG-1 and 16 WCP-1) were brought to be used in these sections. These locomotives performed well but due to aging they were due for replacement by 1963–64. So in September 1963, the Railway Board decided to replace these 57 old locomotives during the Fourth Five Year Plan period. A formal order for the manufacture of ten 1,500 V D.C. freight type locomotives was placed on CLW by the Railway Board in October 1964.

=== Production and trials ===
The design for the locomotive was finalized by RDSO in 1967. As per the specifications, it was expected that the locomotive with a single banker would be capable of hauling a trailing load of 3,660, tonnes goods wagons at balancing speed of 80 km/h in ascending and descending directions on both ghat sections. This would give an intermediate increase of about 50 per cent in the line capacity for goods trains without having to increase the number of trains to be run. The delay in production of locomotives was due to delay in supply of equipment from BHEL, Bhopal. The bodywork bears a strong family resemblance to other CLW designs such as the WCAM-1 and WAM-4.

Three prototypes of the locomotives were manufactured in January, March and June 1971 respectively and trial tests on these were conducted by Central Railway. Although the performance of the prototypes was not satisfactory, series production of locomotives was undertaken and by September 1972. The Railway Board stated (January 1977) that it was not considered desirable to wait for ideal conditions to prevail for the series manufacture to commence as the need for replacing old locomotives was pressing.

=== Service history ===
The new locomotives were brought into use in April 1972 in Kalyan-Igatpuri and Kalyan-Lonavala Sections and by the end of March 1976, 54 locomotives were in service. Since these locomotives could not haul the loads for which they were originally designed, lower hauling loads (permissible load) based on actual experience of the working of these locomotives were fixed by the RDSO to be the capability of the 'present design'. It was noticed that the incidence of failures in WCG-2 locomotives was very large during the period 1973 to 1976. So a new range of upgrades were brought and reliability increased.

Initially, they were used on freight duties and departmental duties. After issues were sorted, they replaced the aging WCG-1 fleet from banking duties. From 1992 to 1996, when the aging WCM series fleet began to fail and created a huge shortage of locomotives, the punctuality of trains in and out of Victoria Terminus went haywire and many trains were cancelled. During this period, WCG-2, sometimes along with Western Railway's WCAM-1 dual-voltage locomotives and WDM-2 diesel locomotives, was used on many express trains including the Deccan Queen. Following the failure of WCM locomotives, the Central Railways received WCAM-3 locomotives in its fleet, and thus several WCG-2 locomotives were put back into freight service, while the WCAM-1 returned back to Western Railway duties and WDM-2 transferred to Konkan Railway duties.

With declining coverage area due to AC electrification, three locomotives were withdrawn as life-expired in November 2006, but withdrawals were slow, mainly due to increased flow of freight and passenger traffic which required extra locomotives; only 21 locomotives had been withdrawn by the end of 2009. On 2 May 2010, the DC Bhor Ghat section was converted to AC marking the end of era of the WCG-2 locomotives performing the banking duties. The last WCG-2s doing shunting duty at CSTM were withdrawn from service in August 2012.

== Locomotive sheds ==
- Kalyan (KYN): All the locomotives of this class has been withdrawn from service.

== Preserved Examples ==
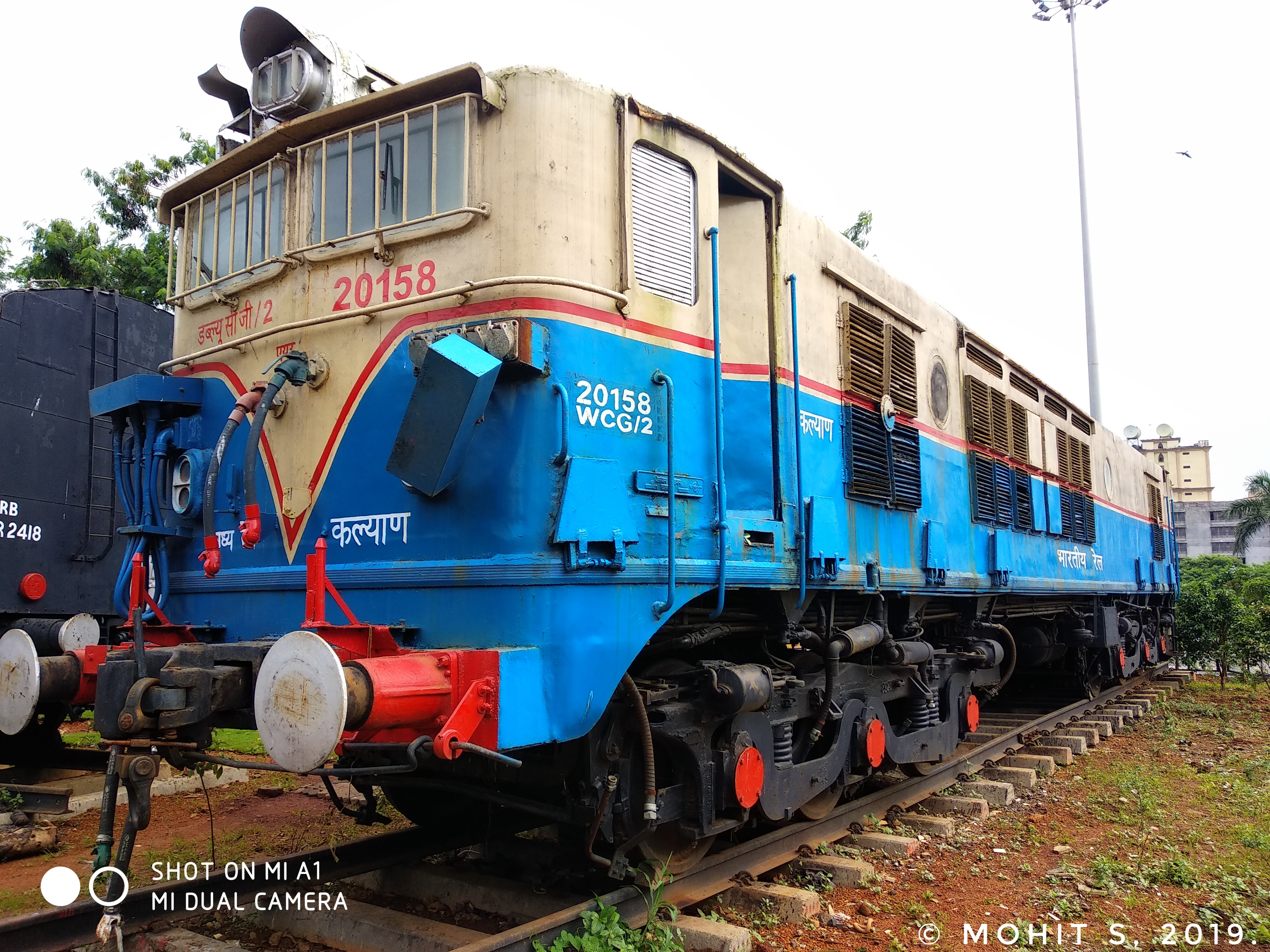
WCG-2 20158

Two WCG-2 locomotives have been preserved.

| Class | Manufacturer | Loco Number | Previous shed | Livery | Location | ref |
|---|---|---|---|---|---|---|
| WCG-2 | CLW | 20108 | Kalyan (KYN) | KYN cream/blue with red lining | Plinthed at CLW Loco Park | |
| WCG-2 | CLW | 20158 | Kalyan (KYN) | KYN cream/blue with red lining | Plinthed at CSMT Heritage Gully 2.0 | |

== Technical specifications ==
Originally, the Railway Board, after due consideration of the relative merits of the BB and Co-Co design locomotives, decided in 1965 to adopt the four-axled BB monomotor bogie for the WCG-2. One of the important considerations was that the production of BB design A.C. locomotives (WAG-1 and WAG-4) which was already established at Chittarajan Locomotive Works and the manufacture of D.C. locomotives of BB design would present no problem. However, in December 1966, the Railway Board decided to change over to six-axled Co-Co design for the locomotives on the following considerations:

- The BB design motor would require considerable modification necessitating change in the bogie. This would require prototype trials to prove the designs before bulk production commenced. This schedule would be totally unsuitable as the requirements, of Central Railway were urgent.
- For the Co-Co design, RDSO proposed to adopt established traction motors and proven ALCO bogies. This would enable CLW to start production in 2 years time and complete about 25/27 locomotives by March 1970.
- A fleet of 57 Co-Co locomotives was expected to give-about 30 per cent additional throughput as compared to the BB design.

| Traction Motors | Heil TM4939AZ (690 hp, 700V, 800A, 1070 rpm, weight 3670 kg) Six motors, axle-hung, nose-suspended, force-ventilated. (4200 hp total power, 1640 1-hour continuous rating in series mode.) |
| Gear Ratio | 62:16 or 62:15 |
| Transformer | BHEL, type HETT-3900. 3900 kVA, 22.5 kV, 182 A. 32 taps, 11730 kg, Forced oil cooling, 'A' Insulation. |
| Rectifiers | Silicon rectifiers (two) using 64 S-18FN-350 diodes each from Hind Rectifier. 2700 A / 1050 V per cubicle. 64 cells per bridge. Starting current at 3300 A. Motor (380 V, 970-1460 RPM) |
| Max Haulage capacity | 2375 t (WAG-5 original) |
| Pantographs | Two Faiveley AM-12 of 285 kg with four insulators |
| Current Ratings | 1100 A / 10 min, 750 A continuous |
| Sandboxes | 16 |
| Auxiliaries | 2 Head lights (32 V, 250 W), Lead-acid Battery (50 cells, 110 V) |
| 3 Elgi Compressors | 3 motors (12.5 hp, 380 V) |
| 2 SF India Ltd. Traction Motor blowers | MLBR-42.51-1-H4 type, 2 Siemens Motors (22 kW, 380 V, 41 A, 3000 rpm) |
| 2 SF India Ltd. Smoothing reactor blower | 2 motors(3 hp, 380V, 2860rpm) |
| BHEL Breaking resistor blower | Dy-3423M type, Moto r(532 kW, 70 hp, 325 V, 175 A, 3500 rpm) |
| 2 SF India Ltd. Silicon rectifier blower | Axial type |
| SF India Ltd. Oil cooler blower | MLBH-60-1-H2 type, 22.2 m/hr, Motor (30 hp, 380 V, 6.6 A, 2865 rpm) |
| 2 Smoothing reactors | SL42 type, 1250 V, 950 A, 0.00718 ohms at 110 °C |
| BEST & Co. Pvt. Ltd. Oil pump for transformer | Motor (3.3 kW, 380 V, 6.6 A, 2865 rpm) |

=== Hauling capacity ===
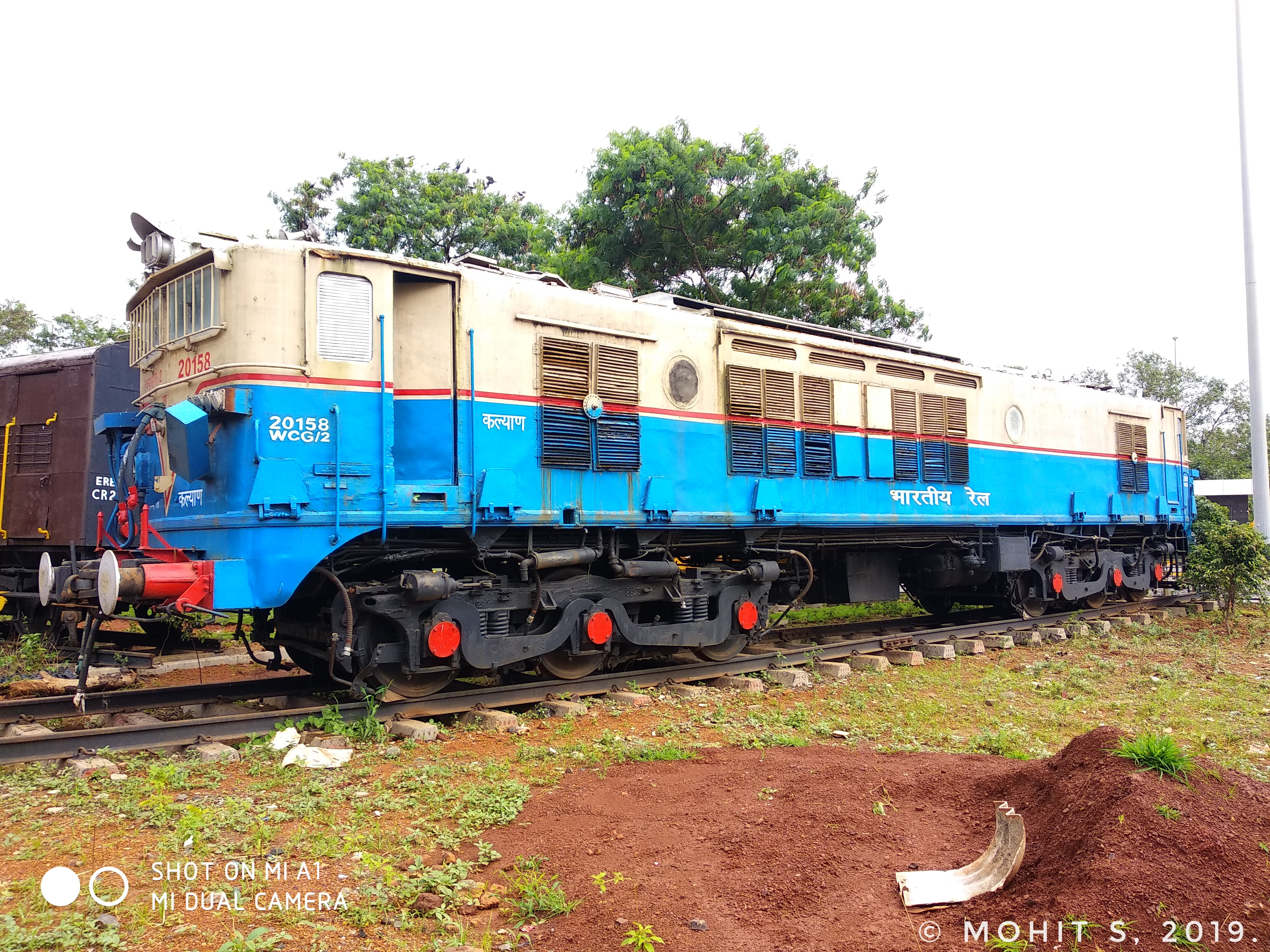
WCG-2 Preserved in CSTM

WCG-2 has the following capacity for 4 wheeler wagons (in tonnes):

| Gradient | Start | 20 km/h | 30 km/h | 40 km/h | 50 km/h | 60 km/h | 70 km/h | 80 km/h |
|---|---|---|---|---|---|---|---|---|
| Level | 6000+ | 6000+ | 6000+ | 6000+ | 6000+ | 6000+ | 4580 | 2665 |
| 1 in 500 | 6000+ | 6000+ | 6000+ | 5325 | 4965 | 3615 | 2700 | 1740 |
| 1 in 200 | 3580 | 3580 | 3540 | 2960 | 2870 | 2140 | 1540 | 1070 |
| 1 in 150 | 2800 | 2800 | 2800 | 2385 | 2310 | 1730 | 1330 | 875 |
| 1 in 100 | 1920 | 1920 | 1920 | 1770 | 1725 | 1240 | 955 | 625 |
| 1 in 50 | 1110 | 1020 | 1010 | 860 | 845 | 630 | | |

WCG-2 has the following capacity for BOX wagons (in tonnes):

| Gradient | Start | 20 km/h | 30 km/h | 40 km/h | 50 km/h | 60 km/h | 70 km/h | 80 km/h |
|---|---|---|---|---|---|---|---|---|
| Level | 6000+ | 6000+ | 6000+ | 6000+ | 6000+ | 6000+ | 6000+ | 4470 |
| 1 in 500 | 5020 | 5020 | 5020 | 5020 | 5020 | 4520 | 3490 | 2200 |
| 1 in 200 | 3450 | 3450 | 3450 | 3290 | 3200 | 2365 | 1910 | 1205 |
| 1 in 150 | 2940 | 2940 | 2940 | 2550 | 2525 | 1920 | 1510 | 950 |
| 1 in 100 | 2240 | 2100 | 2075 | 1870 | 1840 | 1310 | 1050 | 650 |
| 1 in 50 | 1300 | 1045 | 1030 | 885 | 875 | 660 | 550 | 296 |

WCG-2 has the following capacity for BOXN wagons (in tonnes):

| Gradient | Start | 20 km/h | 30 km/h | 40 km/h | 50 km/h | 60 km/h | 70 km/h | 80 km/h |
|---|---|---|---|---|---|---|---|---|
| Level | 6000+ | 6000+ | 6000+ | 6000+ | 6000+ | 6000+ | 6000+ | 4705 |
| 1 in 500 | 5775 | 5775 | 5775 | 5775 | 5775 | 5200 | 3560 | 2200 |
| 1 in 200 | 3790 | 3700 | 3610 | 3510 | 2710 | 1630 | 1100 | 750 |
| 1 in 150 | 3180 | 3180 | 3180 | 2630 | 2565 | 2165 | 1510 | 960 |
| 1 in 100 | 2390 | 2265 | 2230 | 1800 | 1770 | 1500 | 1040 | 655 |
| 1 in 50 | 1350 | 1115 | 1105 | 890 | 880 | 740 | 500 | 295 |

== See also ==
- Rail transport in India § History
- Indian Railways
- Locomotives of India
- Rail transport in India
