= Indian locomotive class WCAG-1 =

Indian Railway class AC and DC mix electric freight locomotive

WCAG–1
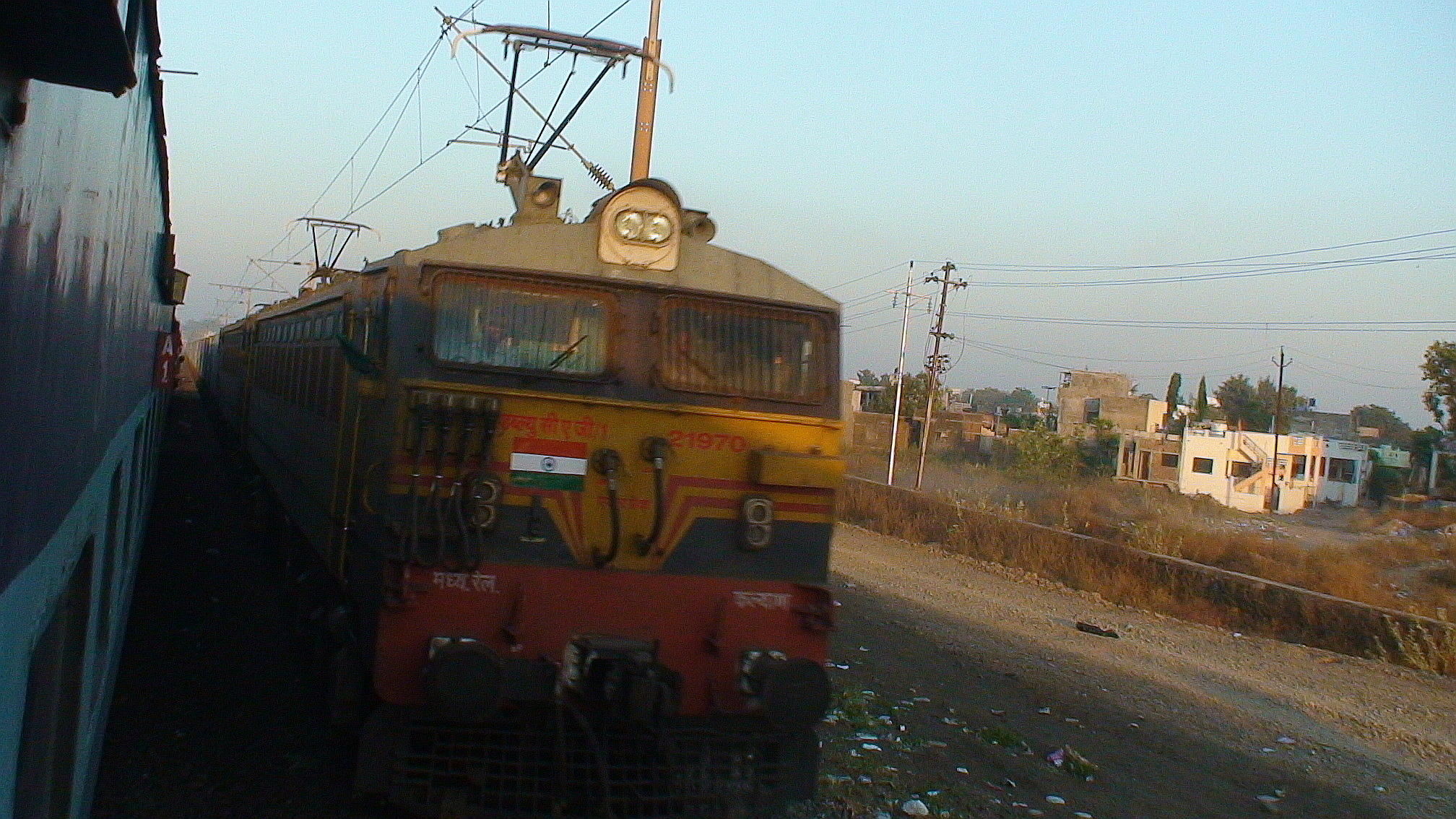
- WCAG-1 21970
Type and origin
- Power type: Electric
- Builder: Bharat Heavy Electricals Limited
- Build date: 1999–2000
- Total produced: 12
Specifications
- Configuration
  - UIC: Co'Co'
- Gauge: 5 ft 6 in (1,676 mm)
- Bogies: Alco High-Adhesion bogies
- Wheel diameter: New: 1,092 mm (3 ft 7 in); Half-worn: 1,055 mm (3 ft 5 1/2 in); Full-worn: 1,016 mm (3 ft 4 in)
- Wheelbase: 13,380 mm (43 ft 11 in)
- Length: 19,880 mm (65 ft 3 in)
- Width: 3,000 mm (9 ft 10 in)
- Height: 4,100 mm (13 ft 5 in)
- Axle load: 21.33 tonnes (20.99 long tons; 23.51 short tons)
- Loco weight: 128 tonnes (126 long tons; 141 short tons)
- Electric system/s: 25 kV 50 Hz AC; 1.5 kV DC (past)
- Current pickups: Pantographs one each for AC and DC(past) (both now used for AC)
- Traction motors: 6 Hitachi HS15250A
- Gear ratio: 16:65
- MU working: 3
- Loco brake: Air and Regenerative
- Train brakes: Air
- Safety systems: TPWS (Train Protection and Warning System), Vacuum Control, Slip/Slide Control, Main Overload Relay, Motor Over Load Relay, No Volt Relay, Over Voltage Protection and Earth Fault Relay, Oil Pressure Governor
Performance figures
- Maximum speed: 100 km/h (62 mph) DC, 100 km/h (62 mph) AC
- Power output: 4,600 hp (3,400 kW) DC; 5,000 hp (3,700 kW) AC
- Tractive effort: Starting : 300 kN (67,000 lb_{f})
Career
- Operators: Central Railways
- Numbers: 21970 - 21981
- Locale: Central Railways (Kalyan)
- Delivered: 1999-2000
- First run: 1999
- Disposition: Active

The Indian locomotive class WCAG–1 is a class of dual-power AC/DC series locomotives used in the Indian Railways system. They are the only class of the WCAG locomotives. They were specifically designed for use by Central Railways in the Ghat section towards Nashik and Pune.

== History ==
The WCAG-1 locomotives were developed after Central Railways faced a massive locomotive crisis in the 1990s. During this period, many of the WCM locomotives, which began to show their age, suffered several failures. As a result, CR had a tough time in maintaining train schedules, which led to the demand for a locomotive similar to the WCAM-2/2P, which was already successful in the Western Railways. Thus the WCAG-1 was introduced along with the WCAM-3, with more power and traction.

The locomotive class was jointly developed by RDSO and BHEL in 1997. Components were shared with the WCAM-3 locos (see below). Co-Co fabricated bogies (High-Adhesion—shwered with WCAM-3, WAG-7, WDG-2, etc.) with secondary suspension. Monocoque underframe. Air brakes were original equipment. They were originally manufactured under a BOLT (build-own-lease-transfer) contract with BHEL, and were probably still owned by BHEL rather than by IR. Axle-hung, nose-suspended, force ventilated, taper roller bearings Speed control by tap changers in AC mode and resistance notching in DC mode. Motors can be placed in different series-parallel combinations. Auxiliaries from Elgi, S F India, Best, Gresham & Craven, etc.

Static converter from ACEC for auxiliary supply. In DC mode, rheostatic braking by self-excitation of traction motors available until 17 km/h. Elgi compressor, other auxiliaries from S F India. Rated for 105 km/h in DC mode (AC mode rated speed was quoted at 120 km/h although it can figuratively go up to 125 km/h). But these locomotives' maximum speeds have been restricted to 100 km/h. Traction motor configurations as in the WCAM-1/2 and WAM-4 (all 6 in series, 2S 3P, or all parallel—the latter was the only one used under AC traction, enforced now by modifications to the locos).

=== Current usage ===
The class are in active service in the Central Railway zone. CR uses WCAG-1 locos on Mumbai-Pune and Mumbai-Igatpuri sections which had ghat portions as well as speed restrictions of about 80 km/h. WCAG-1 locomotives now also serve in routes in and around Nagpur, Bhusaval. Due to exclusivity in operation/maintenance of these locomotives, they do not go beyond the Central Railway's zone limits. These dual-traction models deliver 4600 hp in DC mode and 5000 hp in AC mode, and post 25 kV transformation, WCAG-1s were fully transformed into pure AC locomotives, and the performance was even more improved.

Freight rakes double-headed by WCAG-1 (upgraded models) are a common sight on the ghat sections. MU operation possible with 3 (4?) units.

== Locomotive shed ==
Zone	Name	Shed Code	Quantity
Central Railway	Kalyan	KYN	12
Total locomotives active as July 2026			12

== Technical specifications ==
Class	WCAG–1
Year	1999-2000
Maker	BHEL
Traction Motors	Hitachi HS15250A. Axle-hung, nose-suspended, force-ventilated.
Transformer	BHEL 5400 kVA. 32 taps
Power(hp)	4600 DC / 5000 AC Max., 5000 AC cont.
Rectifiers	Two silicon rectifier units D1800N44 (Siemens), 16 cells per bridge. 1000 V / 3600 A.
Speed	100 DC / 100 AC
Weight(tonnes)	128

== See also ==
- Locomotives of India
- Rail transport in India#History
- Rail transport in India
- Indian Railways
