= Indian locomotive class WAG-7 =

Indian Railway freight class electric locomotive

WAG-7
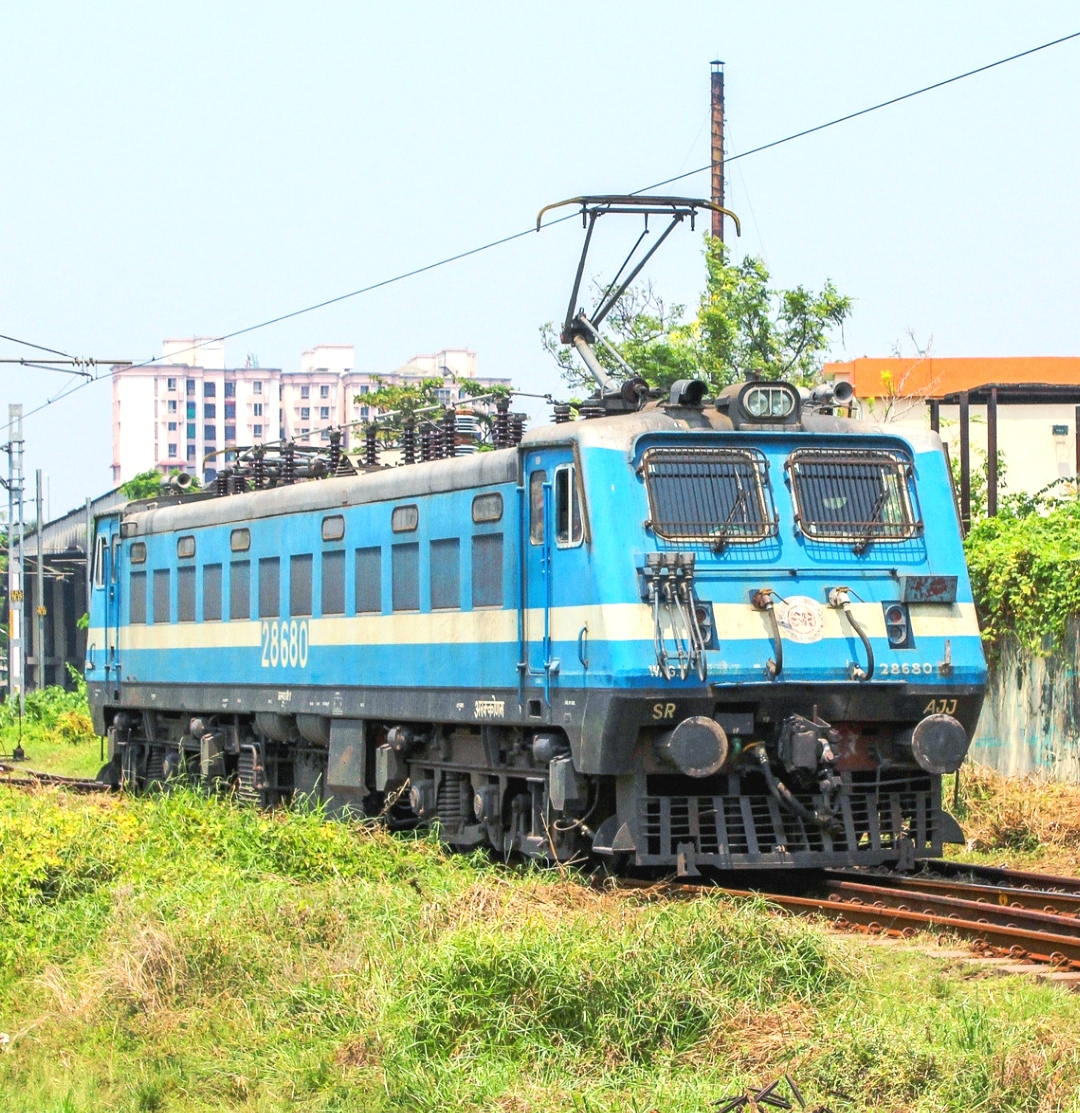
- Arakkonam based WAG-7H at Ernakulam.
Type and origin
- Power type: Electric
- Builder: Chittaranjan Locomotive Works (CLW), Bharat Heavy Electricals Limited (BHEL).
- Build date: 1990–2015(CLW); 2009–2023(BHEL)
- Total produced: 1773 (CLW); 201 (BHEL); 1974
Specifications
- Configuration
  - UIC: Co′Co′
- Gauge: 5 ft 6 in (1,676 mm)
- Bogies: ALCO Fabricated
- Wheel diameter: New:1,092 mm (3 ft 7 in), Half worn:1,055 mm (3 ft 5 1/2 in) and Full worn:1,016 mm (3 ft 4 in)
- Wheelbase: 3.8 m (12 ft 5 5/8 in)
- Length: 20.934 m (68 ft 8 1/8 in)
- Width: 3.179 m (10 ft 5 1/8 in)
- Height: WAG-7 : 4.185 m (13 ft 8 3/4 in); WAG-7H : 4.135 m (13 ft 6 3/4 in)
- Axle load: WAG-7 : 20.5 tonnes (20.2 long tons; 22.6 short tons); WAG-7H : 22 tonnes (22 long tons; 24 short tons)
- Loco weight: WAG-7 : 123 tonnes (121 long tons; 136 short tons); WAG-7H : 132 tonnes (130 long tons; 146 short tons)
- Electric system/s: 25 kV 50 Hz AC Overhead
- Current pickup: pantograph
- Traction motors: WAG-7 : Hitachi HS15250A; WAG-7H : Hitachi HS15250G
- MU working: 4
- Loco brake: Air, Hand and Rheostatic (Friction)
- Train brakes: Air, Vacuum and Dual
- Safety systems: Slip control, Main overload relay, Over voltage relay, No volt relay, Earth fault relay, Low pressure governor, Vacuum Control Governor, Train parting alarms and Brake cylinder cutoff valve
Performance figures
- Maximum speed: 105 km/h (65 mph)
- Power output: Max : 5,350 hp (3,990 kW); Continuous : 5,000 hp (3,730 kW)
- Tractive effort: WAG-7 starting : 48 tons WAG-7 continuous : 45 tons? WAG-7H starting : 91 tons?
- Factor of adh.: 0.345
Career
- Operators: Indian Railways
- Numbers: WAG-7 : 27001-27999, 28000-28770, 24501-24701; WAG-7H : 28024 and 28739
- Nicknames: SHANTIDAN, EKTA, KARAMVIR, GAJRAJ, SWARNABHA, SARVOTTAM, SAMARPAN, CAUVERY, SAMRAT, PRAYAS & AGRASAR
- Locale: All over India
- Disposition: active

The Indian locomotive class WAG-7 is a class of 25 kV AC electric locomotives that was developed in 1990 by Chittaranjan Locomotive Works for Indian Railways. The model name stands for broad gauge (W), alternating current (A), goods traffic (G) engine, 7th generation (7). They entered service in 1992. A total of 1974 WAG-7 were built at CLW and BHEL between 1990 and 2015 by CLW and 2009 and 2023 by BHEL which made them the most numerous class of mainline electric locomotive till its successor the WAG-9.

The WAG-7 is one of the most successful locomotives of Indian Railways, serving freight trains since its introduction in 1990. Even though with the advent of new 3-phase locomotives like WAG-9 and WAG-12, most WAG-7 locomotives are in service. They also act as banker locomotives for express trains and freight trains on Bhor Ghat and Thal Ghat

== History ==
The history of WAG-7 begins in the early 1990s with the aim of addressing the shortcomings of the previous WAG-5 class and remove steam locomotives from IR by a target date of 1990. The WAG-5 though were great successes, had become underpowered to meet the growing demands of the Indian Railways. So in early 1990s IR decided to look for a successor the WAG-5 class. The required specification was of a 5000 horsepower locomotive.

Initially, the Indian railways invited tenders to build locomotives to the new specification. The following responses were received:

- CLW submitted their upgraded WAG-5 model with 5000 hp with Co-Co bogies.
- BHEL submitted a 5000 hp locomotive with thyristors control and Co-Co bogies.

Each company submitted their prototypes and Indian Railways designated these prototypes as the WAG-7 class and WAG-8 class respectively. Technologically thyristor controlled BHEL WAG-8 was meant to be superior to the WAG-7 which was effectively using tap-changer technology from the 1960s. But due to issues from WAG-8, WAG-7 was selected for mass production.

However, even before the WAG-7 another type of electric locomotive was imported from ASEA in 1988. This locomotive was classified as WAG-6A. However WAG-6As were not selected for mass production because emergence of 3 Phase AC locomotives.

== Locomotive sheds ==
Zone	Name	Shed Code	Quantity
Central Railway	Kalyan	KYNE	68 + 45M
Central Railway	Bhusawal	BSLL	25
Eastern Railway	Bardhaman	BWNX	45
Eastern Railway	Jamalpur	JMPD	63
East Central Railway	Pt. Deen Dayal Upadhyaya	DDUE	120
East Central Railway	Pt. Deen Dayal Upadhyaya	DDUX	83
East Coast Railway	Angul	ANGE	163
Northern Railway	Khanalampura	KJGE	2
Northern Railway	Lucknow	AMVD	67
North Central Railway	Jhansi	JHSE	133
North Eastern Railway	Gonda	GDDE	97
Southern Railway	Erode	EDE	94
Southern Railway	Erode	EDDX	28
South Central Railway	Kazipet	KZJD	160
South Coast Railway	Guntakal	GTLE	160
South Eastern Railway	Bokaro Steel City	IPTE	111
South Eastern Railway	Kharagpur	KGPE	226
South East Central Railway	Raipur	RPDX	150
Western Railway	Ratlam	RTMD	68
West Central Railway	New Katni Jn.	NKJD	96
Total Locomotives Active as of October 2026			2008

• Key : M -> WAG-7M (AC/AC loco, converted from DC/AC WCAM-3 loco)

== Conversion of WCAM-3 to WAG-7M ==
Between 2022 and 2024, 46 WCAM-3 locomotives were converted to WAG-7M, while the remaining locomotives are used for passenger duties. For the conversion, these locomotives had their gear ratios changed from 18:64 to 16:65.

== See also ==
- Indian Railways
- Locomotives of India
- Rail transport in India
