= Indian locomotive class WCAM-3 =

Indian Railway class AC and DC mix electric locomotive

WCAM–3
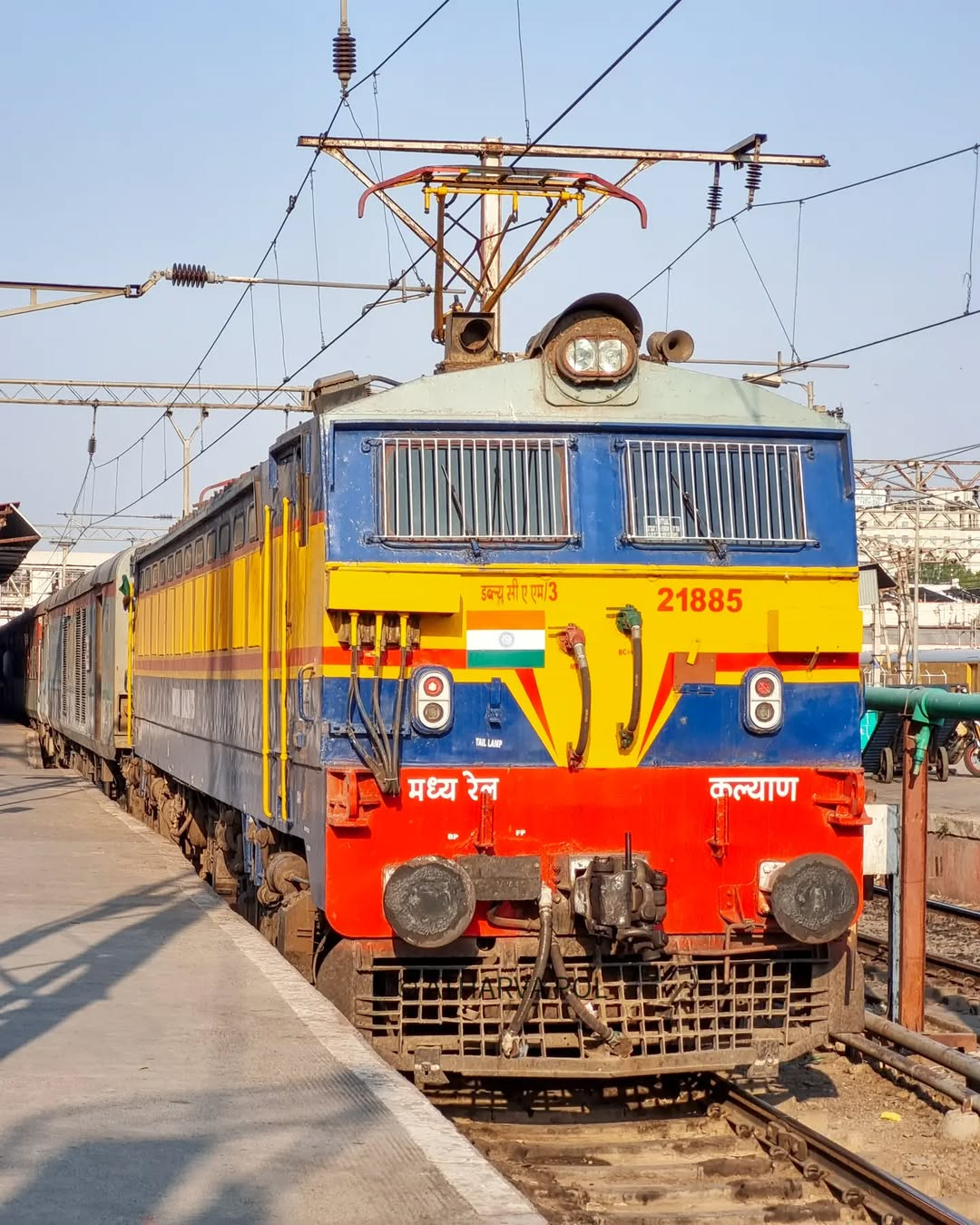
- Kalyan based WCAM-3 at Pune.
Type and origin
- Power type: Electric
- Builder: Bharat Heavy Electricals Limited
- Build date: 1997–1998
- Total produced: WCAM-3: 53
Specifications
- Configuration
  - UIC: Co'Co'
- Gauge: 5 ft 6 in (1,676 mm)
- Electric system/s: 25 kV 50 Hz AC; 1.5 kV DC (formerly)
- Current pickups: Pantographs, one each for AC and DC (both now used for AC)
Performance figures
- Maximum speed: 105 km/h (65 mph) DC; 105 km/h (65 mph) AC
- Power output: Maximum: 5,350 hp (3,990 kW) AC; Continuous: 5,000 hp (3,700 kW) AC 4,600 hp (3,400 kW) DC
Career
- Operators: Central Railways
- Numbers: Starting from 21881-21900 / 21931-21963
- Locale: Central Railways

The Indian locomotive class WCAM–3 is a class of dual-power AC/DC series electric locomotives That was developed in 1997 by Bharat Heavy Electricals Limited used in the Indian Railways system. They are the third locomotives from the WCAM class. The model name stands for broad gauge (W), DC Current (C), AC Current (A), Mixed traffic (M) locomotive, 3rd generation (3). They entered service in 1997. A total of 53 WCAM-3 were built at BHEL between 1997 and 1998, which made them the most numerous class of mainline dual-power AC-DC electric locomotive. They were specifically designed for use by Central Railways in the Ghat section towards Nashik and Pune.

== History ==
=== Background ===
The WCAM-3 locomotives were developed after Central Railways faced a massive locomotive crisis in the 1990s. During this period, many of the WCM locomotives, which began to show their age, suffered several failures. As a result, CR had a tough time in maintaining train schedules, which led to the demand for a locomotive similar to the WCAM-2/2P, which was already successful in the Western Railways. Thus the WCAM-3 was introduced along with the WCAG-1, with more power and traction.

The locomotive class was jointly developed by RDSO and BHEL in 1997. Components were shared with the WCAG-1 locos (see below), such as High-Adhesion fabricated bogies shared with other locomotives such as the WCAG-1, WAG-7 and WDG-2, with secondary suspension, Monocoque underframe, and Air brakes as original equipment. They were originally manufactured under a BOLT (build-own-lease-transfer) contract with BHEL, and were probably still owned by BHEL rather than by IR. Additionally, they have axle-hung, nose-suspended, force ventilated, taper roller bearings Speed control by tap changers in AC mode and resistance notching in DC mode. Motors can be placed in different series-parallel combinations, with auxiliaries from Elgi, S F India, Best, Gresham & Craven, etc.

The locomotive features a static converter from ACEC for auxiliary supply. In DC mode, rheostatic braking by self-excitation of traction motors available until 17 km/h. It has an elgi compressor, other auxiliaries from S F India. They have been rated to run at 105 km/h in DC mode and AC mode.Traction motor configurations as in the WCAM-1/2 and WAM-4 (all 6 in series, 2S 3P, or all parallel—the latter was the only one used under AC traction, enforced now by modifications to the locos).

=== Current usage ===
The class are in active service in the Central Railway zone since its introduction in 1997. CR uses WCAM-3 locos on Mumbai-Pune, Diva-Ratnagiri and Mumbai-Igatpuri sections which had ghat portions as well as speed restrictions of about 100 km/h. They also used to haul intercity trains out of Mumbai DC suburban region on Western as well as Central Railway which was on a 1.5 kV DC overhead system, as opposed to other parts of India which had 25 kV 50 Hz AC overhead. Since its introduction, these locomotives haul trains operating out of Chhatrapati Shivaji Maharaj Terminus (CSMT) and as bankers on Kasara-Igatpuri/Karjat-Lonavla section. Due to exclusivity in operation/maintenance of these locomotives, they do not go beyond the Central Railway's zone limits. These dual-traction models deliver 4600 hp in DC mode and 5000 hp in AC mode. From 2014, when the Central Line was converted to 25 kV traction, the WCAM-3 were fully transformed into pure AC locomotives by removing the DC equipment, and the performance had improved with reduced weight of the locomotive itself. These locomotives began to run between Pune and Kolhapur after electrification was completed in 2022.

Freight rakes double-headed by WCAM-3 (upgraded models) are a common sight on the ghat sections. MU operation is possible with 3-4 units. In December 2005, all WCAM-3 locos had been retrofitted with roof-mounted rheostatic braking grids. The acceleration is similar to those of WAP-4s and sometimes, it is quoted to match the acceleration levels of WAP-7s, although it has not been verified by IR.

== Ageing issues and retirement ==
Since April 2025, it was reported by several loco pilots that the WCAM-3 locomotives has not been able to perform well due to loss of power while climbing the incline sections of Mumbai-Igatpuri and Mumbai-Pune lines as these locomotives have crossed 25 years in service. As a result, several prominent trains, such as the Deccan Queen, were temporarily hauled by diesel locomotives till September 2025 until Kalyan shed got more units of high power AC locomotives like WAP-7.

In July 2025, locomotive number 21936 was withdrawn from service, after being in use for 28 years.

== Locomotive shed ==
Zone	Name	Shed Code	Quantity
Central Railway	Kalyan	KYN	2 (WCAM-3)
Total Locomotives Active as of September 2026			2

== Conversion of WCAM-3 to WAG-7M ==
Between 2022 and 2024, 46 WCAM-3 locomotives were converted to WAG-7M, while the remaining locomotives are used for passenger duties. For the conversion, these locomotives had their gear ratios changed from 18:64 to 16:65.

== Technical specifications ==
Class	WCAM–3
Year	1997+
Maker	BHEL
Traction Motors	Hitachi HS15250A. Axle-hung, nose-suspended, force-ventilated.
Transformer	BHEL 5400 kVA. 32 taps
Power(hp)	4600 DC / 5300 AC Max., 5000 AC cont.
Rectifiers	Two silicon rectifier units D1800N44 (Siemens), 16 cells per bridge. 1000 V / 3600 A.
Speed	105 DC / 130 AC (120 before DC equipment was removed)
Weight(tonnes)	113

== Trains hauled by WCAM-3 ==
- Pragati Express
- Dadar Central - Satara Express
- Deccan Queen
- Koyna Express
- Diva–Ratnagiri Passenger
- Sinhagad Express
- Diva - Sawantwadi Express
- Panchavati Express
- Pune-Ernakulam Express

== See also ==
- Locomotives of India
- Rail transport in India#History
- Rail transport in India
- Indian Railways
