= Indian locomotive class WCAM-2 =

Indian Railway class AC and DC mix electric locomotive

WCAM-2
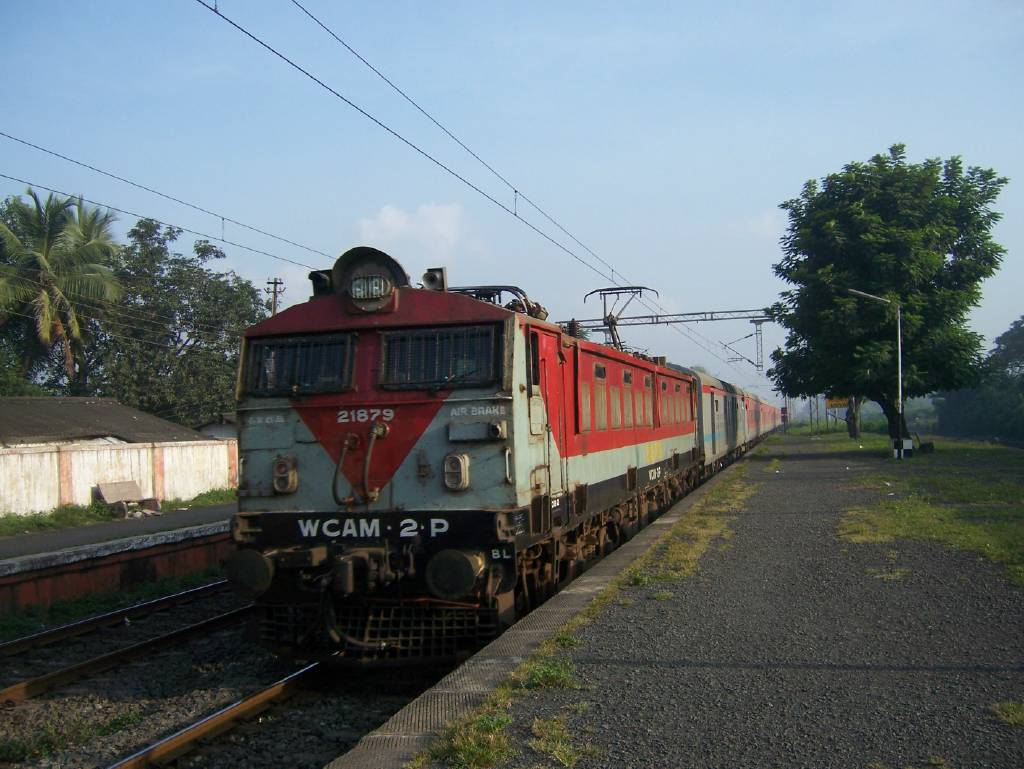
- Valsad based WCAM-2 (now transferred to Kalyan) hauling Hazrat Nizamuddin - Pune AC SF Express.
Type and origin
- Power type: Electric
- Builder: Bharat Heavy Electricals Limited
- Build date: 1995–1998
- Total produced: WCAM-2: 20
Specifications
- Configuration
  - UIC: Co'Co'
- Gauge: 5 ft 6 in (1,676 mm)
- Electric system/s: 25 kV 50 Hz AC AC; 1.5 kV DC
- Current pickups: Pantographs one each for AC and DC (past) (now both pantographs are AC collectors)
Performance figures
- Maximum speed: 80–100 km/h (50–62 mph) DC, 120 km/h (75 mph) AC, Test run 135 km/h (84 mph)
- Power output: Continuous: 4,715 hp (3,516 kW) AC; 2,916 hp (2,174 kW) DC
- Tractive effort: 26,000 kgf (250,000 N; 57,000 lbf) DC; 33,400 kgf (328,000 N; 74,000 lbf) AC
Career
- Operators: Indian Railways
- Numbers: Starting from 21861 to 21880
- Nicknames: Balwant for No.-21861
- Locale: Central Railways (Former Western Railways)
- Withdrawn: October 2026; 1 month ago

The Indian locomotive class WCAM-2 is a class of dual-power AC/DC series electric locomotives that was developed in 1995 by Bharat Heavy Electricals Limited used in the Indian Railways system. They are the second locomotive from the WCAM class. The model name stands for broad gauge (W), DC Current (C), AC Current (A), Mixed traffic (M) locomotive, 2nd generation (2). They entered service in 1995. A total of 20 WCAM-2 were built at BHEL between 1995 and 1996, which made them the most numerous class of mainline dual-power AC/DC electric locomotive. They use the same motors as WCAM 1 but with different circuitry and gearing. They are operational in routes around Mumbai. MU operation was possible with 3 units. WCAM-2P was the passenger-oriented version of the WCAM-2 class. However, they perform better than the WCAM 1 locomotives due to higher power output of the WCAM-2 in both DC and AC configuration.

== History and Technical Specifications ==
The WCAM-2, introduced in 1995, had more power in both DC and AC mode than the WCAM 1 class. However, like the WCAM-1, they also performed poorly in DC mode compared to AC mode. They were used for hauling trains away from the DC section of suburban trains to the AC section and performed the same task as the WCAM-1 did. WCAM-2 locos had the same traction motors, as the WCAM-1 locos, but different circuitry and gearing. The bogies are somewhat different from those of the WCAM-1 being fabricated trimount Co-Co bogies with secondary suspension, with rated speed 105 km/h in DC mode and 120 km/h in AC mode. (In trials by RDSO the loco is said to have been run at speeds up to 135 km/h in AC mode.) Almost all of these were dual-braked, but for maintenance, they were changed to feature air brakes only.

All the WCAM-1's and -2's were homed at Valsad shed in Gujarat. Many of CR's WCAM-2 locos were not used much in DC zones (exceptions were the CR / Bombay Port Trust's Wadala marshalling yard a portion of which has DC traction, and for hauling the Punjab Mail in the late 1990s) as they delivered very poor performance in DC mode and on CR's heavy grades. Although these locos have the same traction motors as the WAM 4 and WCAM 1, the power output from the WCAM-2 locos is higher than for the WAM-4 and WCAM-1 because in those models the traction motors were underfed (3,460 kVA transformer in contrast to the 5,400 kVA transformer for WCAM-2) and did not yield their potential maximum power. Under AC traction, the WCAM-2 locos operate with all six motors in parallel (this has been enforced by modifications to these locos), while in DC mode they also operate in the all-series and series-parallel (2S 3P, i.e., three series-pairs of motors in parallel) configurations.

Late model WCAM-2's from BHEL made in 1998, including the passenger-specific version WCAM-2P, were rated 2,916 hp (2.174 MW) in DC mode and 4,715 hp (3.516 MW) in AC mode (max. speed 120 km/h (75 mph) in AC mode). These were used by WR and CR for fast trains, running at maximum speed. CR had tried the WCAM-2 and WCAM-2P units but found them usable only with speed restrictions. Some WCAM-2P units had only air brakes. With the WCAM-2 locos, MU operation was possible with up to 3 (4?) units. Some (all?) of the WCAM-2 locos were originally leased to IR, ownership remaining with BHEL, the manufacturers.

In February 2012, upon conversion of Western Railway's Churchgate - Virar section from 1500 V DC to 25 kV AC, all the WCAM-2 locomotives were transferred to the Kalyan locomotive shed in the Central Railway zone. Following the conversion of Central line in June 2015 from 1500 V DC to 25kV AC, the WCAM-2 locomotives had their DC equipment progressively removed which led to improved performance caused by weight reduction.

== Retirement ==
As the WCAM-2 locomotives have approached nearly 30 years in service, several issues have cropped up with age, like power loss on incline sections of Mumbai-Igatpuri and Mumbai-Pune lines, which has led to a few short distance trains being hauled by diesel locomotives. As a result, the Central Railways began to retire some of the older locomotives. The retirement began in December 2024, with 5 locomotives withdrawn from service and scrapped. 3 more were withdrawn from service by July 2025. As of July 2026, 2 remain in operation running in inferior services.

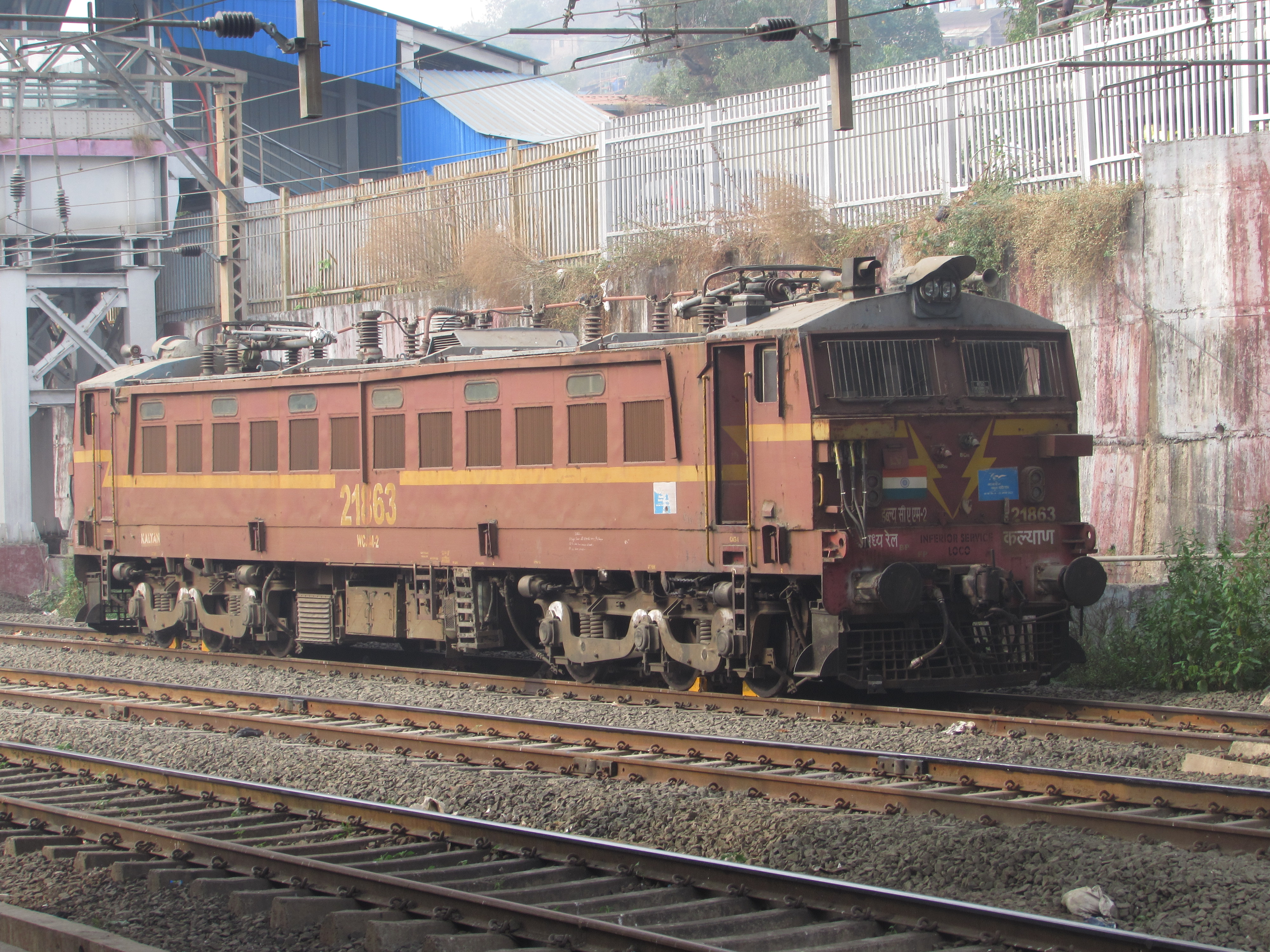
AJNI-Based (Formerly KYN) based WCAM-2/P on siding, in Kasara Railway Station

== Technical specification ==
Manufacturers	Bharat Heavy Electricals Limited
Traction Motors	TAO 659 (575 kW (771 hp), 750 V). Axle-hung, nose-suspended, force-ventilated.
Gear Ratio	62:15, 58:21
Transformer	BHEL 5,400 kVA.
Rectifiers	Two silicon rectifier units D1800N44 (Siemens), 16 cells per bridge. 1 kV / 3.6 kA
Axle load	18.8 t (18.5 long tons; 20.7 short tons)
Bogies	Co-Co trimount fabricated bogies with secondary suspension.
Pantographs	Stone India AM-12 (AC) and Stone India AM-18B (DC) (past)
Notches	Total 32
Weight	113 t (111 long tons; 125 short tons)
Length	20,950 mm (68 ft 8 3/4 in)
Total wheelbase	15,698 mm (51 ft 6 in)
Brakes	Vacuum (past) and/or Air

== Locomotive shed ==
Zone	Name	Shed Code	Quantity
Central Railway	Kalyan	KYN	4
Total Locomotives Active as of September 2026			4

== Trains hauled by WCAM-2/2P ==
1. Pragati Express
2. Sahyadri Express
3. Jhelum Express
4. Kanyakumari Mumbai Express

== See also ==
- Locomotives of India
- Rail transport in India
- Indian Railways
