= Bharat Heavy Electricals Limited =

Indian state-owned engineering and manufacturing company

- Type: Public
- Traded as: BSE: 500103; NSE: BHEL
- ISIN: INE257A01026
- Industry: Power engineering; Electrical equipment; Rail transport; Nuclear power; Defence; Aerospace; Renewable energy; Heavy engineering
- Founded: 13 November 1964; 61 years ago
- Founder: Government of India
- Headquarters: BHEL House, Siri Fort, New Delhi, India
- Area served: Worldwide
- Key people: K. Sadashiv Murthy (Chairman and Managing Director)
- Products: Steam turbines and generators; Boilers; Hydro turbines; Nuclear power equipment; Power transformers; Electric locomotives; Railway propulsion systems; Vande Bharat equipment; Super Rapid Gun Mount; Space-grade batteries and solar panels; Electric vehicle chargers
- Revenue: ₹33,782.18 crore (US$3.5 billion) (FY2026)
- Net income: ₹1,600.26 crore (US$170 million) (FY2026)
- Owner: Government of India (63.17%)
- Number of employees: approximately 28,000
- Parent: Ministry of Heavy Industries
- Website: www.bhel.com

Bharat Heavy Electricals Limited (BHEL) is an Indian state-owned engineering and manufacturing company headquartered in New Delhi. It operates under the administrative control of the Ministry of Heavy Industries and manufactures equipment and systems for power generation, transmission, transportation, defence, aerospace, oil and gas and emerging energy technologies.

BHEL operates 16 manufacturing facilities across India and has business references in more than 90 countries. The company is a Maharatna central public sector enterprise and is listed on the Bombay Stock Exchange and National Stock Exchange of India.

As of 30 June 2026, BHEL had an outstanding order book of approximately ₹260,255 crore (US$27 billion), covering its power, industry and international businesses.

== History ==
The institutional origins of BHEL date to the establishment of Heavy Electricals (India) Limited (HE(I)L). The Government of India signed an agreement with Associated Electrical Industries of the United Kingdom in November 1955 for development of a heavy electrical equipment factory at Bhopal. HE(I)L was incorporated on 29 August 1956.

Increasing demand for electricity led the government to establish additional heavy-electrical manufacturing plants at Tiruchirappalli, Hyderabad and Haridwar. A separate company, Bharat Heavy Electricals Limited, was formally incorporated on 13 November 1964 to establish and manage these plants.

HE(I)L and BHEL operated separately during the 1960s and early 1970s. The Government of India subsequently decided to integrate the two organisations, and HE(I)L was merged with BHEL in January 1974.

During the 1970s and 1980s, BHEL expanded into higher-capacity thermal generating sets, nuclear-power equipment, transmission systems, oil-field equipment, gas turbines and locomotives. Its Corporate Research and Development division was established in Hyderabad in 1977.

In the following decades the company diversified into defence, aerospace, railway transportation, renewable energy, electric mobility, battery storage, coal gasification and hydrogen technologies.

== Operations ==
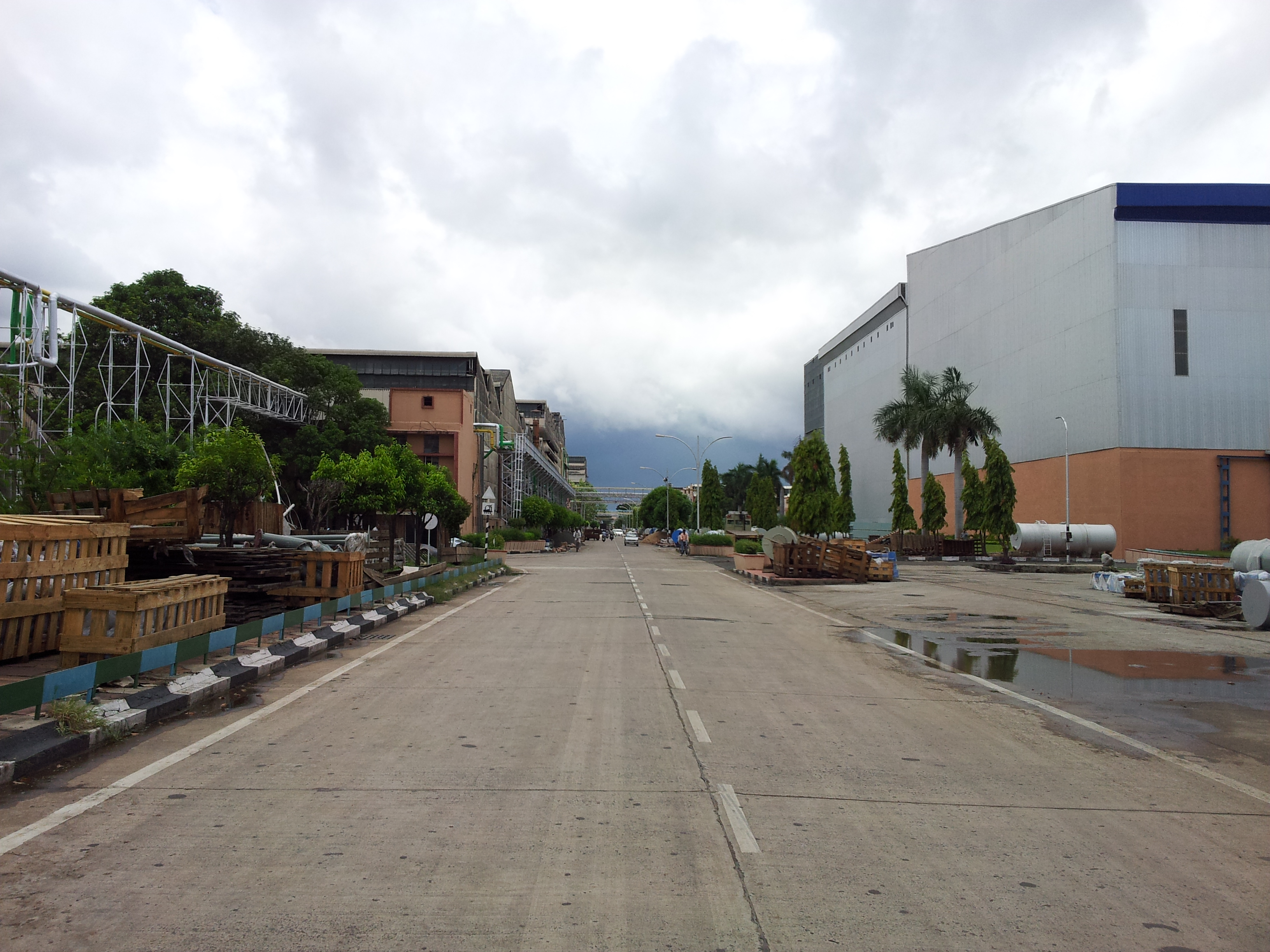
BHEL's heavy electrical equipment manufacturing complex at Bhopal.

BHEL designs, engineers, manufactures, erects, commissions and services industrial and infrastructure equipment. Its operations are broadly divided between the Power and Industry segments.

The company operates 16 manufacturing facilities across India, including major complexes at:

- Bhopal – heavy electrical equipment
- Haridwar – turbines, generators and heavy electrical equipment
- Tiruchirappalli – boilers and boiler components
- Hyderabad – turbines, compressors and heavy power equipment
- Jhansi – transformers and railway equipment
- Bengaluru – electronics, transportation systems, solar and space equipment
- Ranipet – boiler auxiliaries
- Visakhapatnam – heavy plates and vessels
- Thirumayam – power-plant piping

BHEL has supplied more than 197 GW of power-generating equipment worldwide and has supplied equipment representing a substantial share of India's installed utility-scale thermal, hydro and nuclear generating capacity.

== Power generation ==
Power-generation equipment has historically formed BHEL's largest business segment.

The company's products include steam generators, boilers, steam turbines, generators, gas turbines, hydro turbines, electrostatic precipitators, flue-gas desulphurisation systems and associated balance-of-plant equipment.

During FY2025–26, BHEL received approximately ₹59,000 crore (US$6.1 billion) of new power-sector orders. The company commissioned or synchronised approximately 8.9 GW of generating capacity during the year.

== Nuclear power ==
BHEL has supplied equipment to India's nuclear-energy programme since the 1970s. Its nuclear products include steam generators, reactor headers, steam turbines, generators, heat exchangers and pressure vessels.

BHEL states that it is associated with all three stages of India's three-stage nuclear power programme:

1. Pressurised Heavy Water Reactors
2. Fast breeder reactors
3. Advanced heavy-water reactor technology

In 2023, BHEL and the Nuclear Power Corporation of India signed an agreement to jointly explore construction of additional PHWR-based nuclear-power plants.

BHEL-manufactured turbine-generator equipment has been installed at several Indian nuclear stations, including Kaiga Atomic Power Station, Kakrapar Atomic Power Station and the Rajasthan Atomic Power Station.

== Rail transportation ==
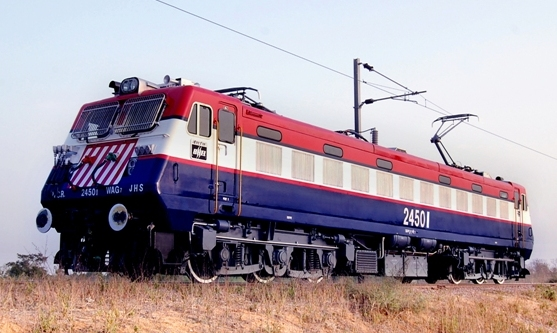
A WAG-7 electric locomotive manufactured by BHEL.

BHEL has supplied railway equipment to Indian Railways for several decades. Its transportation portfolio includes electric locomotives, traction motors, traction transformers, converters, auxiliary converters, train-control equipment and electric multiple-unit propulsion systems.

=== Vande Bharat ===
In 2023, a BHEL-led consortium with Titagarh Rail Systems received an Indian Railways contract to manufacture and maintain 80 Vande Bharat sleeper trainsets.

The trainsets are designed for operating speeds of up to 160 kilometres per hour (99 mph).

In January 2026, BHEL began supplying indigenously manufactured underslung traction converters and traction transformers for the programme from its Bengaluru and Jhansi units.

=== Kavach ===
BHEL has expanded into railway signalling and train-protection systems. During FY2025–26 it received its first order from Indian Railways for the design, development and installation of Kavach equipment on a section of South Western Railway.

== Defence and aerospace ==
BHEL manufactures defence and aerospace systems including naval guns, integrated platform-management systems, compact heat exchangers, motors, generators and space-qualified electrical equipment.

=== Naval weapons ===
BHEL manufactures the Oto Melara 76 mm gun under license as 76/62 Super Rapid Gun Mount (SRGM) at their facility in Haridwar, Uttarakhand. The SRGM are being supplied to the Indian Navy and the Indian Coast Guard since 1994. BHEL also produces an upgraded variant incorporating the Strales system (with integrated director radar) and DART (guided projectile) and VULCANO (extended effective range) ammunition. The variant was introduced with the Nilgiri-class frigates.

=== Aerospace and space systems ===
BHEL manufactures space-grade lithium-ion cells, batteries and solar panels and supplies specialised components for Indian space and aerospace programmes.

BHEL supplied space-grade solar panels and lithium-ion batteries for the joint NASA–ISRO NISAR satellite mission.

The company has also received work associated with pump modules for India's Advanced Medium Combat Aircraft programme.

== Renewable energy and emerging technologies ==
BHEL's renewable-energy activities include solar photovoltaic plants, floating solar systems, battery energy-storage systems, electric-vehicle charging equipment and emerging hydrogen technologies.

In July 2026, BHEL entered into a strategic collaboration with thyssenkrupp nucera India for phased localisation and manufacture of alkaline electrolyser systems for green-hydrogen projects in India.

=== Coal gasification ===
BHEL has developed technology for gasification of high-ash Indian coal.

In January 2026, BHEL received an approximately ₹5,400 crore (US$560 million) contract from Bharat Coal Gasification and Chemicals Limited, a joint venture between Coal India and BHEL, for a coal-gasification and raw-syngas-cleaning plant at Jharsuguda, Odisha.

== Research and development ==
BHEL operates its Corporate Research and Development centre in Hyderabad and research groups within its manufacturing divisions.

Its research areas include power electronics, electric machines, advanced materials, surface engineering, computational fluid dynamics, intelligent machines and robotics, high-voltage engineering, nanotechnology and clean-energy systems.

BHEL's current corporate profile states that it maintains 15 Centres of Excellence and five specialised research centres.

== Financial performance ==
For the financial year ended 31 March 2026, BHEL reported consolidated revenue from operations of ₹33,782.18 crore (US$3.5 billion) and consolidated profit after tax of ₹1,600.26 crore (US$170 million).

Financial year	Revenue from operations	Profit after tax
2024–25	₹27,350 crore (US$2.8 billion)	₹504 crore (US$52 million)
2025–26	₹33,782.18 crore (US$3.5 billion)	₹1,600.26 crore (US$170 million)

During FY2025–26, BHEL received approximately ₹75,000 crore (US$7.8 billion) of new orders. Its year-end outstanding order book was approximately ₹240,000 crore (US$25 billion).

By 30 June 2026, its outstanding order book had increased to approximately ₹260,255 crore (US$27 billion).

== Manufacturing facilities ==
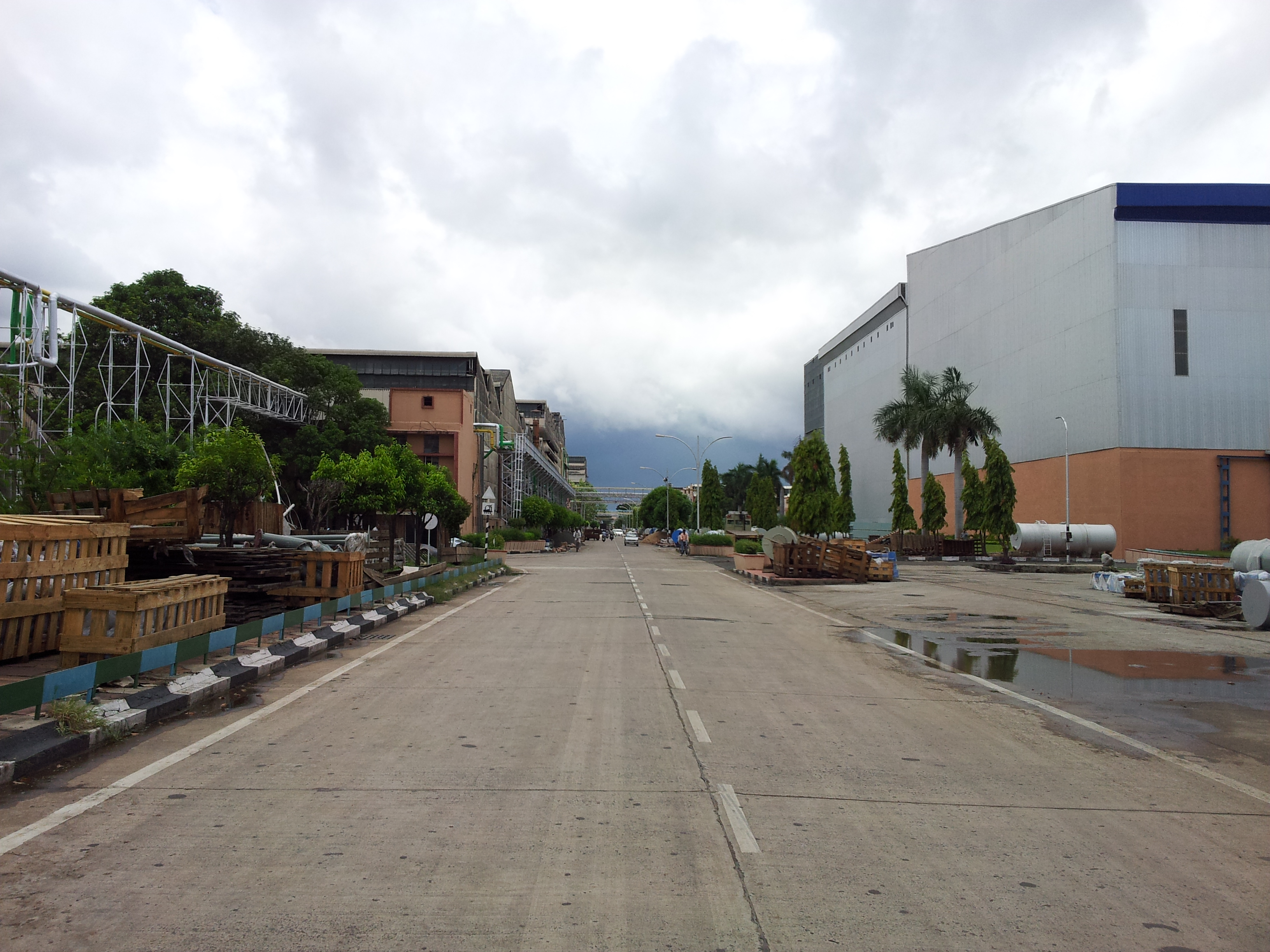
BHEL's Bhopal manufacturing complex.

Major manufacturing locations include Haridwar, Bhopal, Tiruchirappalli, Hyderabad, Jhansi, Bengaluru, Ranipet, Visakhapatnam, Thirumayam, Jagdishpur and Goindwal.

The Haridwar complex manufactures large turbines, generators and naval gun systems, while the Tiruchirappalli units manufacture boilers, pressure components and nuclear steam generators.

BHEL Jhansi manufactures transformers and railway equipment, and the company's Bengaluru operations manufacture electronics, propulsion systems, solar equipment and space-grade electrical systems.

== International operations ==
BHEL has executed projects and supplied equipment across more than 90 countries on all six inhabited continents.

Its overseas activities include power-generation equipment, transmission systems, industrial equipment, renovation and modernisation projects, and engineering services.

== See also ==
- List of public sector undertakings in India
- Ministry of Heavy Industries
- Titagarh Rail Systems
- Vande Bharat Express
- Nuclear Power Corporation of India
- Indian Railways
- Defence industry of India
