= India–United States Civil Nuclear Agreement =

Agreement for Cooperation between the Government of the United States of America and the Government of India Concerning Peaceful Uses of Nuclear Energy
- Type: Bilateral civil nuclear cooperation agreement, Section 123 Agreement
- Signed: October 10, 2008 (signed by the US Secretary of State and Indian Minister of External Affairs)
- Location: Washington, D.C.
- Effective: December 6, 2008
- Signatories: United States; India

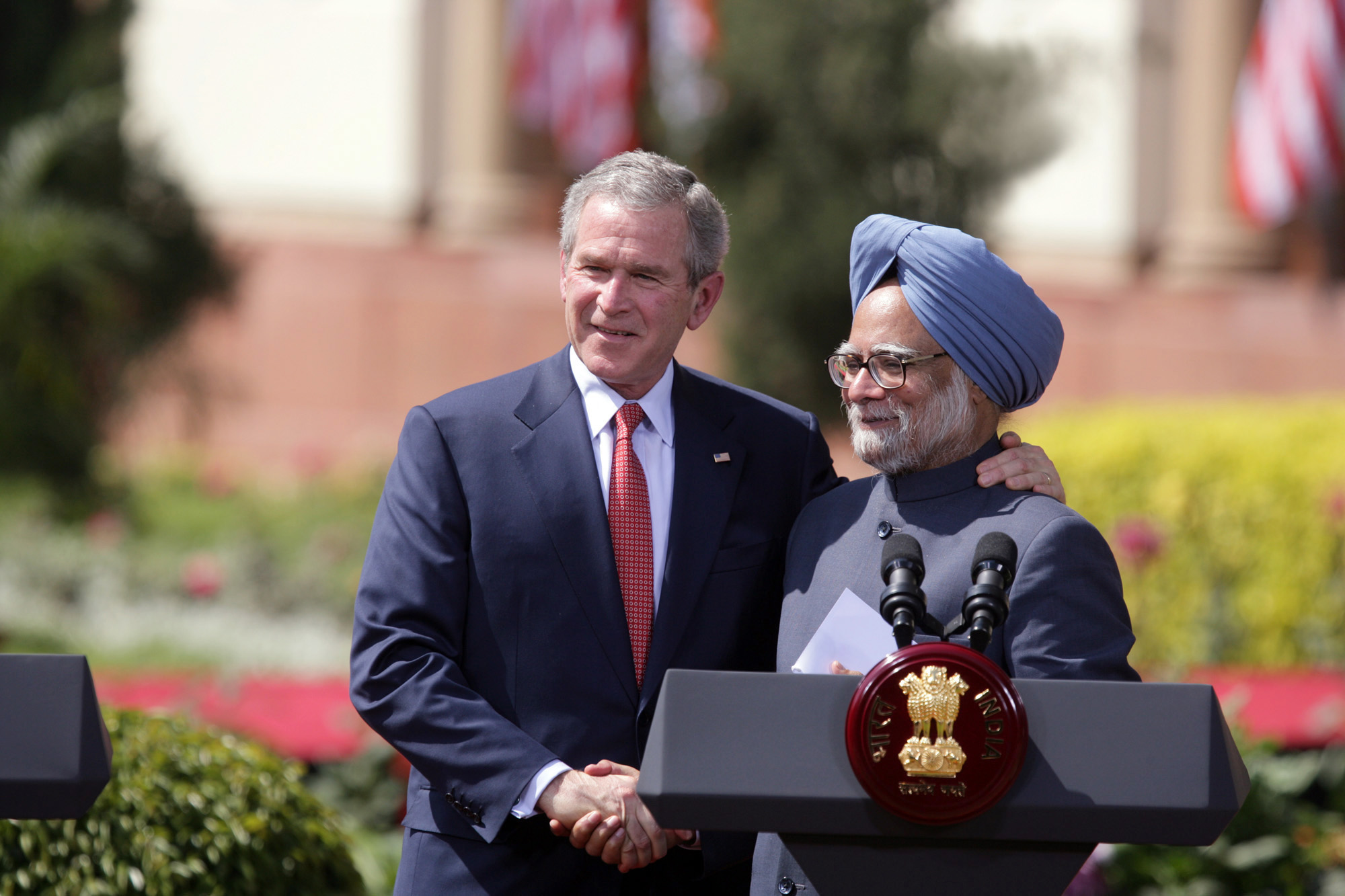
U.S. President George Bush and India's Prime Minister Manmohan Singh exchange handshakes in New Delhi on March 2, 2006.

The Agreement for Cooperation between the Government of the United States of America and the Government of India Concerning Peaceful Uses of Nuclear Energy, colloquially known as the 123 Agreement (signed between the United States of America and India), is also commonly referred to as the U.S.–India Civil Nuclear Agreement or the Indo-US nuclear deal. The broader framework for this agreement was a July 18, 2005 joint statement by then Indian Prime Minister Manmohan Singh and then U.S. President George W. Bush, under which India agreed to separate its civil and military nuclear facilities and to place all its civil nuclear facilities under International Atomic Energy Agency (IAEA) safeguards and, in exchange, the United States agreed to work toward full civil nuclear cooperation with India.

This U.S.-India deal took more than three years to come to fruition as it had to go through several complex stages, including amendment of U.S. domestic law, especially the Atomic Energy Act of 1954, a civil-military nuclear Separation Plan in India, an India-IAEA safeguards (inspections) agreement and the grant of an exemption for India by the Nuclear Suppliers Group (NSG), an export-control regime that had been formed mainly in response to India's first nuclear test in 1974. In its final shape, the deal places under permanent safeguards those nuclear facilities that India has identified as "civil" and permits broad civil nuclear cooperation, while excluding the transfer of "sensitive" equipment and technologies, including civil enrichment and reprocessing items even under IAEA safeguards. On August 1, 2008, the IAEA Board of Governors approved, and on February 2, 2009, India signed an India-specific safeguards agreement with the IAEA. After India brought this agreement into force, inspections began in a phased manner on the 35 civilian nuclear installations India has identified in its Separation Plan. The deal is seen as a watershed in U.S.-India relations and introduces a new aspect to international nonproliferation efforts.

Following the approval of the safeguards agreement, the United States approached the NSG to grant a waiver to India to commence civilian nuclear trade. The 48-nation NSG granted the waiver to India on September 6, 2008, allowing it to access civilian nuclear technology and fuel from other countries. The implementation of this waiver made India the only known country with nuclear weapons which is not a party to the Non-Proliferation Treaty (NPT) but is still allowed to carry out nuclear commerce with the rest of the world.

The U.S. House of Representatives passed the bill to approve the deal on September 28, 2008. Two days later, India and France signed a similar nuclear pact making France the first country to have such an agreement with India. On October 1, 2008, the U.S. Senate also approved the civilian nuclear agreement allowing India to purchase nuclear fuel and technology from—and sell them to—the United States. U.S. president, George W. Bush, signed the legislation on the Indo-US nuclear deal, approved by the U.S. Congress, into law, now called the United States-India Nuclear Cooperation Approval and Non-proliferation Enhancement Act, on October 8, 2008. The agreement was signed by then Indian External Affairs Minister Pranab Mukherjee and his counterpart then Secretary of State Condoleezza Rice, on October 10.

India went on to sign civil nuclear cooperation agreements with a number of countries. As of April 2026 India is importing fuel for 16 of its reactors. Nuclear power capacity has increased from 4 GW in 2007 to 8.8 GW in 2026. The nuclear power generation is up over three times from 2007-08 to 2024-25. A major issue in the implementation of the agreement for the United States has been India's nuclear liability regime. In 2025 the Civil Liability for Nuclear Damage Act, 2010 was repealed and replaced by the SHANTI Act, 2025. American companies that have made inroads into India in the nuclear sector include Westinghouse Electric Company, General Electric, Holtec International and Clean Core Thorium Energy.

== Overview ==
The Henry J. Hyde United States-India Peaceful Atomic Energy Cooperation Act of 2006, also known as the Hyde Act, is the U.S. domestic law that modifies the requirements of Section 123 of the U.S. Atomic Energy Act to permit nuclear cooperation with India and in particular to negotiate a 123 Agreement to operationalize the 2005 Joint Statement. As a domestic U.S. law, the Hyde Act is binding on the United States. The Hyde Act cannot be binding on India's sovereign decisions although it can be construed as prescriptive for future U.S. reactions. As per the Vienna Convention, an international agreement such as the 123 Agreement cannot be superseded by an internal law such as the Hyde Act.

The 123 agreement defines the terms and conditions for bilateral civilian nuclear cooperation, and requires separate approvals by the U.S. Congress and by Indian cabinet ministers. The agreement will also help India meet its goal of adding 25,000 MW of nuclear power capacity through imports of nuclear reactors and fuel by 2020.

After the terms of the 123 agreement were concluded on July 27, 2007, it ran into trouble because of stiff opposition in India from the communist allies of the ruling United Progressive Alliance. The government survived a confidence vote in the parliament on July 22, 2008, by 275–256 votes in the backdrop of defections by some parties. The deal also had faced opposition from non-proliferation activists, anti-nuclear organisations, and some states within the Nuclear Suppliers Group. In February 2008, U.S. Secretary of State Condoleezza Rice said that any agreement would be "consistent with the obligations of the Hyde Act". The bill was signed on October 8, 2008.

== Background ==
Parties to the Non-Proliferation Treaty (NPT) have a recognized right of access to peaceful uses of nuclear energy and an obligation to cooperate on civilian nuclear technology. Separately, the Nuclear Suppliers Group has agreed on guidelines for nuclear exports, including reactors and fuel. Those guidelines condition such exports on comprehensive safeguards by the International Atomic Energy Agency, which are designed to verify that nuclear energy is not diverted from peaceful use to weapons programs. Though neither India, Israel, nor Pakistan have signed the NPT, India argues that instead of addressing the central objective of universal and comprehensive non-proliferation, the treaty creates a club of "nuclear haves" and a larger group of "nuclear have-nots" by restricting the legal possession of nuclear weapons to those states that tested them before 1967, who alone are free to possess and multiply their nuclear stockpiles. India insists on a comprehensive action plan for a nuclear-free world within a specific time-frame and has also adopted a voluntary "no first use" policy.

Led by the U.S., other states have set up an informal group, the Nuclear Suppliers Group (NSG), to control exports of nuclear materials, equipment and technology. Consequently, India was left outside the international nuclear order, which forced India to develop its own resources for each stage of the nuclear fuel cycle and power generation, including next generation reactors such as fast breeder reactors and a thorium breeder reactor known as the Advanced Heavy Water Reactor. In addition to impelling India to achieve success in developing these new reactor technologies, the sanctions also provided India with the impetus to continue developing its own nuclear weapons technology with a specific goal of achieving self-sufficiency for all key components for weapons design, testing and production.

Given that India is estimated to possess reserves of about 80,000–112,369 tons of uranium, India has more than enough fissile material to supply its nuclear weapons program, even if it restricted Plutonium production to only 8 of the country's 17 current reactors, and then further restricted Plutonium production to only 1/4 of the fuel core of these reactors. According to the calculations of one of the key advisers to the US Nuclear deal negotiating team, Ashley Tellis:

Operating India's eight unsafeguarded PHWRs in such a [conservative] regime would bequeath New Delhi with some 12,135–13,370 kilograms of weapons-grade plutonium, which is sufficient to produce between 2,023–2,228 nuclear weapons over and above those already existing in the Indian arsenal. Although no Indian analyst, let alone a policy maker, has ever advocated any nuclear inventory that even remotely approximates such numbers, this heuristic exercise confirms that New Delhi has the capability to produce a gigantic nuclear arsenal while subsisting well within the lowest estimates of its known uranium reserves.

However, because the amount of nuclear fuel required for the electricity generation sector is far greater than that required to maintain a nuclear weapons program, and since India's estimated reserve of uranium represents only 1% of the world's known uranium reserves, the NSG's uranium export restrictions mainly affected Indian nuclear power generation capacity. Specifically, the NSG sanctions challenge India's long-term plans to expand and fuel its civilian nuclear power generation capacity from its current output of about 4GWe (GigaWatt electricity) to a power output of 20GWe by 2020; assuming the planned expansion used conventional Uranium/Plutonium fueled heavy water and light water nuclear power plants.

Consequently, India's nuclear isolation constrained expansion of its civil nuclear program, but left India relatively immune to foreign reactions to a prospective nuclear test. Partly for this reason, but mainly due to continued unchecked covert nuclear and missile proliferation activities between Pakistan, China and North Korea, India conducted five more nuclear tests in May 1998 at Pokhran.

India was subject to international sanctions after its May 1998 nuclear tests. However, due to the size of the Indian economy and its relatively large domestic sector, these sanctions had little impact on India, with Indian GDP growth increasing from 4.8% in 1997–1998 (prior to sanctions) to 6.6% (during sanctions) in 1998–1999. Consequently, at the end of 2001, the Bush administration decided to drop all sanctions on India. Although India achieved its strategic objectives from the Pokhran nuclear tests in 1998, it continued to find its civil nuclear program isolated internationally.

== Rationale behind the agreement ==
=== Nuclear non-proliferation ===
The proposed civil nuclear agreement implicitly recognizes India's "de facto" status even without signing the NPT. The Bush administration justifies a nuclear pact with India arguing that it is important in helping to advance the non-proliferation framework by formally recognizing India's strong non-proliferation record even though it has not signed the NPT. The former Under Secretary of State for Political Affairs, Nicholas Burns, one of the architects of the Indo-U.S. nuclear deal said "India's trust, its credibility, the fact that it has promised to create a state-of-the-art facility, monitored by the IAEA, to begin a new export control regime in place, because it has not proliferated the nuclear technology, we can't say that about Pakistan." when asked whether the U.S. would offer a nuclear deal with Pakistan on the lines of the Indo-U.S. deal. Mohamed ElBaradei, former head of the International Atomic Energy Agency, which would be in charge of inspecting India's civilian reactors has praised the deal as "it would also bring India closer as an important partner in the nonproliferation regime". The reaction in the U.S. led academic community was mixed. While some authors praised the agreement as bringing India closer to the NPT regime, others argued that it gave India too much leeway in determining which facilities were to be safeguarded and that it effectively rewarded India for continuously refusing to accede to the Non-Proliferation Treaty.

=== Economic considerations ===
In India, the proponents of the agreement cite economic considerations as one of the topmost factors in their support of the agreement. For example, Indian scholar Rejaul Karim Laskar argues, "the most important significance of the deal for India (is) related to the contribution it will make in meeting India's energy requirements to sustain high rate of economic growth". Financially, the U.S. also expects that such a deal could spur India's economic growth and bring in $150 billion in the next decade for nuclear power plants, of which the U.S. wants a share. It is India's stated objective to increase the production of nuclear power generation from its present capacity of 4,780 MWe to 20,000 MWe by 2020. India's parliament passed The Civil Liability for Nuclear Damages bill on August 25, 2010, which allows the operator to sue the supplier in case of an accident due to technical defects in the plant. After the nuclear disaster at the Fukushima Daiichi Nuclear Power Plant in Japan, issues relating to the safety of operating nuclear power plants, compensation in the event of a radiation-leak accident, disaster clean-up costs, operator responsibility and supplier liability has once again come into the spot-light.

=== Nuclear technology ===
Dr. Siegfried S. Hecker, PhD., former Director of the Los Alamos National Laboratory, observed while testifying before a U.S. Senate Committee in 2008 that the United States might benefit from access to Indian nuclear technology: "I found that whereas sanctions slowed progress in nuclear energy, they made India self-sufficient and world leaders in fast reactor technologies. While much of the world's approach to India has been to limit its access to nuclear technology, it may well be that today we limit ourselves by not having access to India's nuclear technology developments. Such technical views should help to advice the diplomatic efforts with India."

Because India's nuclear program was developed mostly indigenously, the country used unique techniques that other countries can learn from.

=== Strategic ===
Since the end of the Cold War, The Pentagon, along with certain U.S. ambassadors such as Robert Blackwill, has requested increased strategic ties with India and a de-hyphenization of Pakistan with India, i.e. having separate policies toward India and Pakistan rather than just an "India-Pakistan" policy. The United States also sees India as a viable counter-weight to the growing influence of China, and a potential client and job creator.

While India is self-sufficient in thorium, possessing 25% of the world's known and economically viable thorium, it possesses a meager 1% of the similarly calculated global uranium reserves. Indian support for cooperation with the U.S. centers on the issue of obtaining a steady supply of sufficient energy for the economy to grow. Indian opposition to the pact centers on the concessions that would need to be made, as well as the likely de-prioritization of research into a thorium fuel cycle if uranium becomes highly available given the well understood utilization of uranium in a nuclear fuel cycle.

== Passing of Agreement ==
On March 2, 2006, in New Delhi, George W. Bush and Manmohan Singh signed a Civil Nuclear Cooperation Agreement, following an initiation during the July 2005 summit in Washington between the two leaders over civilian nuclear cooperation. Apart from the civil military separation plan, India pledged to sign an Additional Protocol with the IAEA, implement the Weapons of Mass Destruction Act of May 2005, take steps related to enrichment and reprocessing technologies such as limiting their spread, work to conclude a Fissile Material Cutoff Treaty, and follow Missile Technology Control Regime and Nuclear Suppliers Group guidelines.

Heavily endorsed by the White House, the agreement is thought to be a major victory to George W. Bush's foreign policy initiative and was described by many lawmakers as a cornerstone of the new strategic partnership between the two countries.

On August 3, 2007, both the countries released the full text of the 123 agreement. Nicholas Burns, the chief negotiator of the India-United States nuclear deal, said the U.S. has the right to terminate the deal if India tests a nuclear weapon and that no part of the agreement recognizes India as a nuclear weapons state (which would be contrary to the NPT).

== Separation plan ==
A Congressional Research Service report on March 3, 2006 states "The separation plan agreed upon on March 2, 2006, appears to place 14 of 22 reactors under safeguards, equaling about 65% of India’s total nuclear energy output". President Bush described the plan as "a good faith gesture by the Indian government that I'll be able to take to the Congress."

On 7 March 2006 Prime Minister Singh stated that of the 22 thermal power reactors in the country 14 have been identified as civilian and that these would be placed under safeguards by 2014, that all future civilian reactors would be placed under safeguards, and that there is a need to ensure reliability of fuel supplies keeping in mind the previous experience of lack of fuel for Tarapur. Steps to ensure a continuation in fuel supplies include negotiating with the IAEA an India-specific fuel supply agreement, developing a strategic reserve and bringing in other countries to come together to find ways to restore the fuel supply if such a case should so happen to occur. As of 2023, India had placed 22 civilian power reactors and 9 nuclear fuel cycle facilities under safeguards.

== Hyde Act passage in the U.S. ==
On December 18, 2006, President George W. Bush signed the Hyde Act into law. The Act was passed by an overwhelming 359–68 in the United States House of Representatives on July 26 and by 85–12 in the United States Senate on November 16 in a strong show of bipartisan support.

The House version (H.R. 5682) and Senate version (S. 3709) of the bill differed due to amendments each had added before approving, but the versions were reconciled with a House vote of 330–59 on December 8 and a Senate voice-vote on December 9 before being passed on to President G.W. Bush for final approval. The White House had urged Congress to expedite the reconciliation process during the end-2006 lame duck session, and recommended removing certain amendments which would be deemed deal-killers by India.

In response to the language Congress used in the Act to define U.S. policy toward India, President Bush, stated "Given the Constitution's commitment to the authority of the presidency to conduct the nation's foreign affairs, the executive branch shall construe such policy statements as advisory," going on to cite sections 103 and 104 (d) (2) of the bill. To assure Congress that its work would not be totally discarded, Bush continued by saying that the executive would give "the due weight that comity between the legislative and executive branches should require, to the extent consistent with U.S. foreign policy."

== Political opposition in India ==
The Indo-US civilian nuclear agreement was met with stiff opposition by some political parties and activists in India. Although many mainstream political parties including the Congress supported the deal along with regional parties like Dravida Munnetra Kazhagam and Rashtriya Janata Dal its realization ran into difficulties in the face of stiff political opposition in India. Also, in November 2007, former Indian Military chiefs, bureaucrats and scientists drafted a letter to Members of Parliament (MPs) expressing their support for the deal. However, opposition and criticism continued at political levels. The Samajwadi Party (SP) which was with the Left Front in opposing the deal changed its stand after discussing with ex-president of India and scientist Dr A. P. J. Abdul Kalam. The SP then supported the government and the deal. The Indian Government survived a vote of confidence by 275–256 after the Left Front withdrew their support to the government over this dispute. Results showed that as many as 21 MPs belonging to different parties cross-voted.

As details were revealed about serious inconsistencies between what the Indian parliament was told about the deal, and the facts about the agreement that were presented by the Bush administration to the US Congress, opposition grew in India against the deal. In particular, portions of the agreement dealing with guaranteeing India a fuel supply or allowing India to maintain a strategic reserve of nuclear fuel appear to be diametrically opposed to what the Indian parliament was led to expect from the agreement: Prime Minister Manmohan Singh's statement in parliament is totally at variance with the Bush administration's communication to the House Foreign Affairs Committee, which says India will not be allowed to stockpile such nuclear fuel stocks as to undercut American leverage to re-impose sanctions. To drive home this point, it says the 123 Agreement is not inconsistent with the Hyde Act's stipulation—the little-known 'Barack Obama Amendment' – that the supply of nuclear fuel should be "commensurate with reasonable operating requirements". The 'strategic reserve' that is crucial to India's nuclear program is, therefore, a non-starter.

Furthermore, the agreement, as a result of its compliance with the Hyde Act, contained a direct linkage between shutting down US nuclear trade with India and any potential future Indian nuclear weapons test, a point that was factually inconsistent with explicit reassurances made on this subject by Prime Minister, Manmohan Singh, during final parliamentary debate on the nuclear deal. As professor Brahma Chellaney, an expert in strategic affairs and one of the authors of the Indian Nuclear Doctrine, explained:

While the Hyde Act's bar on Indian testing is explicit, the one in the NSG waiver is implicit, yet unmistakable. The NSG waiver is overtly anchored in NSG Guidelines Paragraph 16, which deals with the consequence of "an explosion of a nuclear device". The waiver's Section 3(e) refers to this key paragraph, which allows a supplier to call for a special NSG meeting, and seek termination of cooperation, in the event of a test or any other "violation of a supplier-recipient understanding". The recently leaked Bush administration letter to Congress has cited how this Paragraph 16 rule will effectively bind India to the Hyde Act's conditions on the pain of a U.S.-sponsored cut-off of all multilateral cooperation. India will not be able to escape from the U.S.-set conditions by turning to other suppliers.

== Indian Parliament vote ==
On July 9, 2008, India formally submitted the safeguards agreement to the IAEA. This development came after the Prime Minister of India Manmohan Singh returned from the 34th G8 summit meeting in Hokkaido, Japan, where he met with U.S. President George W. Bush. On June 19, 2008, news media reported that Indian Prime Minister Dr. Manmohan Singh threatened to resign his position if the Left Front, whose support was crucial for the ruling United Progressive Alliance to prove its majority in the Indian parliament, continued to oppose the nuclear deal and he described their stance as irrational and reactionary. According to The Hindu, External Affairs Minister Pranab Mukherjee's earlier statement said "I cannot bind the government if we lose our majority," implying that United Progressive Alliance government would not put its signature on any deal with IAEA if it lost the majority in either an 'opposition-initiated no-confidence motion' or if failing to muster a vote of confidence in Indian parliament after being told to prove its majority by the president. On July 8, 2008, Prakash Karat announced that the Left Front was withdrawing its support to the government over the decision by the government to go ahead on the United States-India Peaceful Atomic Energy Cooperation Act. The left front had been a staunch advocate of not proceeding with this deal citing national interests.

On July 22, 2008, the UPA faced its first confidence vote in the Lok Sabha after the Communist Party of India (Marxist) led Left Front withdrew support over India approaching the IAEA for Indo-U.S. nuclear deal. The UPA won the confidence vote with 275 votes to the opposition's 256 with 10 members abstaining from the vote.

== IAEA approval ==
The IAEA Board of Governors approved the safeguards agreement on August 1, 2008, and the 45-state Nuclear Suppliers Group next had to approve a policy allowing nuclear cooperation with India. U.S. President Bush can then make the necessary certifications and seek final approval by the U.S. Congress. There were objections from Pakistan, Iran, Ireland, Norway, Switzerland, and Austria at the IAEA meeting.

== NSG waiver ==
On September 6, 2008, India was granted the waiver at the NSG meeting held in Vienna, Austria. The consensus was arrived at after overcoming misgivings expressed by Austria, Ireland, and New Zealand and is an unprecedented step in giving exemption to a country which has not signed the NPT and the Comprehensive Test Ban Treaty (CTBT) The Indian team who worked on the deal includes Manmohan Singh, Pranab Mukherjee, Shivshankar Menon, Shyam Saran, M. K. Narayanan, Anil Kakodkar, Ravi Grover, and DB Venkatesh Varma.

=== Versions of U.S. draft exemption ===
In August 2008 U.S. draft exemption would have granted India a waiver based on the "steps that India has taken voluntarily as a contributing partner in the non-proliferation regime". Based on these steps, and without further conditions, the draft waiver would have allowed for the transfer to India of both trigger list and dual-use items (including technology), waiving the full-scope safeguards requirements of the NSG guidelines.

A September 2008 waiver would have recognized additional "steps that India has voluntarily taken." The waiver called for notifying the NSG of bilateral agreements and for regular consultations; however, it also would have waived the full-scope safeguards requirements of the NSG guidelines without further conditions.

The U.S. draft underwent further changes in an effort to make the language more acceptable to the NSG.

=== Initial support and opposition ===
The deal had initial support from the United States, the United Kingdom, France, Japan, Russia, and Germany. After some initial opposition, there were reports of Australia, Switzerland, and Canada expressing their support for the deal. Selig S. Harrison, a former South Asia bureau chief of The Washington Post, has said the deal may represent a tacit recognition of India as a nuclear weapon state, while former U.S. Undersecretary of State for Arms Control and International Security Robert Joseph says the "U.S. State Department made it very clear that we will not recognize India as a nuclear-weapon state".

Norway, Austria, Brazil, and Japan all warned that their support for India at the IAEA did not mean that they would not express reservations at the NSG. New Zealand, which is a member of the NSG but not of the IAEA Board of Governors, cautioned that its support should not be taken for granted. Ireland, which launched the non-proliferation treaty process in 1958 and signed it first in 1968, doubted India's nuclear trade agreement with the U.S. Russia, a potentially large nuclear supplier to India, expressed reservations about transferring enrichment and reprocessing technology to India. China argued the agreement constituted "a major blow to the international non-proliferation regime". New Zealand said it would like to see a few conditions written in to the waiver: the exemption ceasing if India conducts nuclear tests, India signing the International Atomic Energy Agency's (IAEA) additional protocol, and placing limits on the scope of the technology that can be given to India and which could relate to nuclear weapons. Austria, Ireland, the Netherlands, Switzerland and Scandinavian countries proposed similar amendments. The nuclear deal was opposed by former U.S. president Jimmy Carter, who opined that the U.S. would be making "a dangerous deal with India"

After the first NSG meeting in August 2008, diplomats noted that up to 20 of the 45 NSG states tabled conditions similar to the Hyde Act for India's waiver to do business with the NSG. "There were proposals on practically every paragraph," a European diplomat said. A group of seven NSG members suggested including some of the provisions of the U.S. Hyde Act in the final waiver. Daryll Kimball, executive director of the Washington-based Arms Control Association, said the NSG should at a minimum "make clear that nuclear trade with India shall be terminated if it resumes testing for any reason. If India cannot agree to such terms, it suggests that India is not serious about its nuclear test moratorium pledge."

=== Reactions following the waiver ===
After India was granted the waiver on September 6, the United Kingdom said that the NSG's decision would make a "significant contribution" to global energy and climate security. U.S. National Security Council spokesman Gordon Johndroe said, "this is a historic achievement that strengthens global non-proliferation principles while assisting India to meet its energy requirements in an environmentally friendly manner. The United States thanks the participating governments in the NSG for their outstanding efforts and cooperation to welcome India into the global non-proliferation community. We especially appreciate the role Germany played as chair to move this process forward." New Zealand praised the NSG consensus and said that it got the best possible deal with India. One of India's strongest allies Russia said in a statement, "We are convinced that the exemption made for India reflects Delhi's impeccable record in the non-proliferation sphere and will guarantee the peaceful uses of nuclear exports to India." Australian Foreign Minister Stephen Smith said that the NSG granted waiver because of "India's rise as a global power" and added, "If such a request was made for another country, I don't think it would have been cleared by the NSG members." During his visit to India in September 2008, Smith said that Australia "understood and respected India's decision not to join the Non-Proliferation Treaty". German Foreign Ministry spokesman Jens Ploetner called India a "special case" and added, "Does this agreement send an approving message to Iran? No, it absolutely does not."

Initially, there were reports of the People's Republic of China analyzing the extent of the opposition against the waiver at the NSG and then revealing its position over the issue. On September 1, 2008, prominent Chinese newspaper People's Daily expressed its strong disapproval of the civilian agreement with India. India's National Security Advisor remarked that one of the major opponents of the waiver was China and said that he would express Indian government's displeasure over the issue. It was also revealed that China had abstained during the final voting process, indicating its non-approval of the nuclear agreement. In a statement, Chinese delegation to the NSG said the group should address the aspirations of other countries too, an implicit reference to Pakistan. There were also unconfirmed reports of India considering the cancellation of a state visit by Chinese Foreign Minister Yang Jiechi. However, External Affairs Minister Pranab Mukherjee said the Chinese Foreign Minister will be welcomed "as an honored guest". The Times of India noted that China's stance could have a long-term implication on Sino-Indian relations.

There were some other conflicting reports on China's stance, however. The Hindu reported that though China had expressed its desire to include more stern language in the final draft, they had informed India about their intention to back the agreement. In an interview to the Hindustan Times, Chinese Assistant Foreign Minister Hu Zhengyue said that "China understands India's needs for civil nuclear energy and related international cooperation." Chinese Foreign Minister Yang Jiechi told India's CNN-IBN, "We didn't do anything to block it [the deal]. We played a constructive role. We also adopted a positive and responsible attitude and a safeguards agreement was reached, so facts speak louder ... than some reports". During a press conference in New Delhi, Yang added, "The policy was set much before that. When consensus was reached, China had already made it clear in a certain way that we have no problem with the [NSG] statement." Highlighting the importance of Sino-Indian relations, Yang remarked, "let us [India and China] work together to move beyond doubts to build a stronger relationship between us."

==== Indian reactions ====
Indian PM Manmohan Singh visited Washington, D.C., on September 26, 2008, to celebrate the conclusion of the agreement with U.S. President George W. Bush. He also visited France to convey his appreciation for the country's stance. India's External Affairs Minister Pranab Mukherjee expressed his deep appreciation for India's allies in the NSG, especially the United States, United Kingdom, France, Russia, Germany, South Africa and Brazil for helping India achieve NSG's consensus on the nuclear deal.

Bharatiya Janata Party's Yashwant Sinha, who also formerly held the post of India's External Affairs Minister, criticized the Indian government's decision to seek NSG's consensus and remarked that "India has walked into the non-proliferation trap set by the U.S., we have given up our right to test nuclear weapons forever, it has been surrendered by the government". However, another prominent member of the same party and India's former National Security Advisor Brajesh Mishra supported the development at the NSG and said that the waiver granted made "no prohibition" on India to conduct nuclear tests in the future.

A leading advocate of the agreement was India's most eminent strategic affairs analyst K. Subrahmanyam, also known for his long and controversial championing of an Indian nuclear deterrent. He argued that the convergence of strategic interests between the two nations forced such a remarkable gesture from the US, overturning its decades-long stand on non-proliferation, and that it would be unwise on India's part to spurn such an overture. He also argued that not recognizing new geo-political realities would be even more foolhardy on the part of the Indian elite.

Former President of India and noted Indian scientist, A. P. J. Abdul Kalam, also supported the agreement and remarked that New Delhi may break its "voluntary moratorium" on further nuclear tests in "supreme national interest". However, analyst M K Bhadrakumar demurred. He said that the consensus at NSG was achieved on the "basis" of Pranab Mukherjee's commitment to India's voluntary moratorium on nuclear testing and by doing so, India has entered into a "multilateral commitment" bringing it within "the ambit of the CTBT and NPT".

The NSG consensus was welcomed by several major Indian companies. Corporations like Videocon Group, Tata Power and Jindal Power saw a US$40 billion nuclear energy market in India. Corporations Bharat Heavy Electricals Limited, National Thermal Power Corporation and Larsen & Toubro anticipated business opportunities in the sector valued around US$100 billion during this period. According to The Times of India, nuclear energy will produce 52,000 MW of electricity in India by 2020.

=== Other reactions over the issue ===
More than 150 non-proliferation activists and anti-nuclear organizations called for tightening the initial NSG agreement to prevent harming the current global non-proliferation regime. Among the steps called for were:

- ceasing cooperation if India conducts nuclear tests or withdraws from safeguards
- supplying only an amount of fuel which is commensurate with ordinary reactor operating requirements
- expressly prohibiting the transfer of enrichment, reprocessing, and heavy water production items to India
- opposing any special safeguards exemptions for India
- conditioning the waiver on India stopping fissile production and legally binding itself not to conduct nuclear tests
- not allowing India to reprocess nuclear fuel supplied by a member state in a facility that is not under permanent and unconditional IAEA safeguards
- agreeing that all bilateral nuclear cooperation agreements between an NSG member-state and India explicitly prohibit the replication or use of such technology in any unsafeguarded Indian facilities

The call said that the draft Indian nuclear "deal would be a nonproliferation disaster and a serious setback to the prospects of global nuclear disarmament" and also pushed for all world leaders who are serious about ending the arms race "to stand up and be counted."

Dr. Kaveh L. Afrasiabi, who has taught political science at Tehran University, has argued the agreement will set a new precedent for other states, adding that the agreement represents a diplomatic boon for Tehran. Ali Ashgar Soltanieh, the Iranian Deputy Director General for International and Political Affairs, has complained the agreement may undermine the credibility, integrity and universality of the Nuclear Nonproliferation Treaty. Pakistan argues the safeguards agreement "threatens to increase the chances of a nuclear arms race in the subcontinent." Pakistani Foreign Minister Shah Mahmood Qureshi has suggested his country should be considered for such an accord, and Pakistan has also said the same process "should be available as a model for other non-NPT states". On July 19, 2010, U.S. Secretary of State Hillary Clinton countered Pakistan statements by saying that Pakistan's checkered history on nuclear proliferation "raises red flags" regarding nuclear cooperation with Pakistan. Israel is citing the Indo-U.S. civil nuclear deal as a precedent to alter Nuclear Suppliers Group (NSG) rules to construct its first nuclear power plant in the Negev desert, and is also pushing for its own trade exemptions.

Brahma Chellaney, a professor of strategic studies at the New Delhi-based Centre for Policy Research, argued that the wording of the U.S. exemption sought to irrevocably tether New Delhi to the nuclear non-proliferation regime. He argued India would be brought under a wider non-proliferation net, with India being tied to compliance with the entire set of NSG rules. India would acquiesce to its unilateral test moratorium being turned into a multilateral legality. He concluded that instead of the "full" civil nuclear cooperation that the original July 18, 2005, deal promised, India's access to civil nuclear enrichment and reprocessing technologies would be restricted through the initial NSG waiver.

== Consideration by U.S. Congress ==
The Bush administration told Congress in January 2008 that the United States may cease all cooperation with India if India detonates a nuclear explosive device. The administration further said it was not its intention to assist India in the design, construction, or operation of sensitive nuclear technologies through the transfer of dual-use items. The statements were considered sensitive in India because debate over the agreement in India could have toppled the government of Prime Minister Manmohan Singh. The State Department had requested they remain secret even though they were not classified. Secretary of State Condoleezza Rice also previously told the House Foreign Affairs Panel in public testimony that any agreement would "have to be completely consistent with the obligations of the Hyde Act". Assistant Secretary of State for South and Central Asian Affairs Richard Boucher and the Former Assistant Secretary of State for Legislative Affairs Jeffrey Bergner also said the agreement would be in conformity with the Hyde Act.

Howard Berman, chair of the U.S. House Foreign Affairs Committee, in a letter to U.S. Secretary of State Condoleezza Rice warned that an NSG waiver "inconsistent" with the 2006 Hyde Act would "jeopardise" the Indo-U.S. nuclear deal in the U.S. Congress. Edward J. Markey, co-chairman of the House Bipartisan Task Force on Non-proliferation, said that there needed to be clear consequences if India broke its commitments or resumed nuclear testing.

=== Passage in Congress ===
On September 28, 2008, the US House of Representatives voted 298–117 to approve the Indo-US nuclear deal. On October 1, 2008, the US Senate voted 86–13 to approve the Indo-US nuclear deal. The Arms Control Association said the agreement fails to make clear that an Indian nuclear test would prompt the U.S. to cease nuclear trade; however, Secretary of State Condoleezza Rice said that any nuclear test by India would result in the "most serious consequences," including automatic cut-off of U.S. cooperation as well as a number of other sanctions.

After Senate approval, US President George W. Bush said the deal would "strengthen our global nuclear nonproliferation efforts, protect the environment, create jobs, and assist India in meeting its growing energy needs in a responsible manner." Then-US presidential candidates Barack Obama and John McCain, as well as then-vice presidential candidate Joe Biden, voted in support of the bill.

== Formal signing of the deal ==
There was speculation the Indo-US deal would be signed on October 4, 2008, when U.S. Secretary of State Condoleezza Rice was in India. The deal was to be signed by Indian External Affairs Minister Pranab Mukherjee and U.S. Secretary of State Condoleezza Rice. The two leaders were to sign the deal at 2 pm at the Hyderabad House in New Delhi. But Mr. Mukherjee announced that India would wait for the U.S. president to sign the 123 agreement legislation first into law and address India's concerns on fuel supply guarantees and the legal standing of the 123 agreement in the accompanying signing statement.

Secretary Rice was aware of the Indian decision before she left Washington. But she was very hopeful that the deal would be signed as the U.S. State Department had said that the President's signature was not prerequisite for Rice to ink the deal. Rice had earlier said that there were still a number of administrative details to be worked out even as she insisted that the US would abide by the Hyde Act on the testing issue:

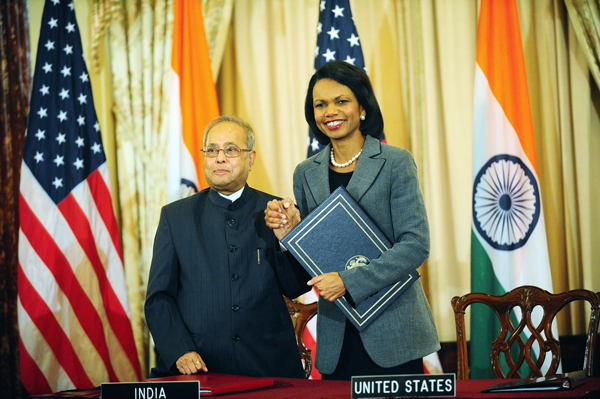
Secretary Rice and Indian Minister for External Affairs Pranab Mukherjee after signing the 123 agreement in Washington on October 10, 2008

There are a lot of administrative details that have to be worked out. This (the deal) was only passed in our Congress two days ago. The President is looking forward to signing the bill, sometime, I hope, very soon, because we'll want to use it as an opportunity to thank all of the people who have been involved in this", said Rice.

In Washington, a Senate Democratic aide said that such a delay was not that unusual because legislation needed to be carefully reviewed before being sent to the White House.

US President George W. Bush signed the legislation on the Indo-US nuclear deal into law on October 8. The new law, called the United States-India Nuclear Cooperation Approval and Non-proliferation Enhancement Act, was signed by President Bush at a brief White House function in the presence of the Secretary of State Condoleezza Rice, Energy Secretary Samuel Bodman, Vice President Dick Cheney and the Indian Ambassador to the U.S. Ronen Sen besides a large gathering of other dignitaries. The final administrative aspect of the deal was completed after Secretary of State Condoleezza Rice and External Affairs Minister Pranab Mukherjee signed the bilateral instruments of the 123 Agreement in Washington on October 10 paving the way for operationalization of the deal between the two countries.

== Impact, implementation and aftermath ==
=== Global engagement ===
The agreement has helped India break free from international isolation in the civil nuclear sector and showed India as a responsible user of civil nuclear technology. The 2008 agreement, and subsequent international agreements, have allowed for the regulated import of fuel for 16 reactors (as of April 2026). Starting with France and US in 2008, civil nuclear cooperation agreements have been signed with Russia, Canada, Argentina, Kazakhstan, South Korea, Australia, Sri Lanka, United Kingdom, Japan, Vietnam and Bangladesh.

=== Electricity generation and nuclear power targets ===
On August 13, 2007 Prime Minister Manmohan Singh announced in the Lok Sabha that India's "target for the year 2020 is 20,000 MW of nuclear power generation"; he called this a "modest" goal and that it could be "doubled if international cooperation once again became available". In 2011 (three years after the India–United States Civil Nuclear Agreement was signed) this target was revised down to 14,600 MW by 2020. Projections in the draft energy policy of 2017 were lower: 12,000 MW by 2022. In March of the same year, the parliament was told that the target was 14.6 GWe by 2024.

The target of 20,000 MW is decades old, having been announced by Atomic Energy Commission (AEC) in 1962. In 2007 M. V. Ramana writes "From the very beginning, plans for the Indian nuclear program were ambitious". India's vision in its Nuclear Energy Mission in 2025 for 2047 is a target of 100 GW; in 2026 India's nuclear power capacity is 8.8 GW. This is up from 4020 MW in 2007-08. Total nuclear power generation is up from 16956 MU in 2007-08 to 56681 MU in 2024-25. Nuclear power generation projections by the Department of Atomic Energy is 207,000 to 275,000 MW by the year 2052.

=== India's nuclear liability regime ===
A major issue in the implementation of the India–United States Civil Nuclear Agreement has been India's nuclear liability regime. India's nuclear liability regime was enshrined in the Civil Liability for Nuclear Damage Act 2010. The basic purpose of the act, as is the case of all nuclear liability laws, was to provide timely and sufficient compensation to victims of nuclear accidents. One of the issues with the act was who should pay the liability in the case of a nuclear accident. In contrast with international norms, the Indian law appeared to place liability not only on the operator, but on the supplier/manufacturer as well in certain cases. Although the Act channels primary liability to the nuclear operator, the operator is provided with a "right of recourse" against a supplier in specified circumstances, including where a nuclear accident results from "supply of equipment or material with patent or latent defects or sub-standard services".

Attempts by the Indian government to break the logjam included publication of the 2011 Civil Liability for Nuclear Damage Rules. An explanatory text such as a FAQ by the Ministry of External Affairs was published in 2015. During President Barack Obama's visit to India in January 2015, a workaround to the liability issue in the form a nuclear insurance pool was decided upon. This pool had limited success. All of the workarounds failed to produce the outcome wanted.

There are a number of reasons why India passed the act in the first place: the nuclear deal was a major policy win for Prime Minister Singh and many opponents of it were more than happy to support a law that undermined the efforts of the government, US lobbying in relation to liability was seen with caution on both sides of the aisle, and thirdly the legacy of the Bhopal disaster hung over all liability conversations.

Russia is constructing an additional four reactors, but other suppliers have been leery of India's nuclear liability regime. One of the reasons Russia's Rosatom pushes ahead seemingly undeterred by liablity issues is that it is a state-owned company offered "protections" by the Russian government. French companies also have their nuclear accident liability covered by the state.

The Civil Liability for Nuclear Damage Act 2010 was repealed by the Sustainable Harnessing and Advancement of Nuclear Energy for Transforming India Act, 2025 (SHANTI Act, 2025), bringing India's nuclear liability regime in line with India's obligations as a party to the 1997 Convention on Supplementary Compensation for Nuclear Damage.

=== Tracking nuclear material ===
Implementation of the nuclear deal brought up the issue of keeping tabs on the location and usage of US-supplied nuclear material in India. The purpose of this 'administrative arrangement' is to ensure that nuclear material obtained through trade does not end up in nuclear weapons. India however maintained that keeping a track of and accouting for nuclear material by nationality was not required as the International Atomic Energy Agency (IAEA) already covered the matter. In January 2015, during President Barack Obama's visit to India, the United States withdrew its tracking demands.

=== Reprocessing agreement ===
India and the United States announced finishing negotiations related to reprocessing U.S. origin and obligated nuclear material on March 29, 2010. On July 30, 2010 the agreement was signed. As per the agreement India gets advance consent to reprocess spent nuclear fuel over the 40 year period of the Agreement for Cooperation Concerning Peaceful Uses of Nuclear Energy in a new Indian reprocessing facility under IAEA safeguards.

=== Nuclear deal pledges ===
Initiated in the joint statement of 2005, and further elaborated and agreed to in the coming days, and in addition to the separation plan, India pledged to harmonize and adhere to the Missile Technology Control Regime (MTCR) and Nuclear Suppliers Group (NSG) guidelines. India became a member of the MTCR on 27 June 2016. India applied for NSG membership in 2016 however failed to get it following lack of consensus within the group. With respect to the pledge related to implementing the Weapons of Mass Destruction Act of May 2005, India passed rules in 2016.

=== US nuclear companies in India ===
==== Westinghouse ====
In 2016, the Nuclear Power Corporation of India Ltd. (NPCIL) and Westinghouse Electric Company agreed to build six nuclear reactors in India. This agreement was signed during talks at the White House between President Obama and Prime Minister Modi. The joint statement read, "Culminating a decade of partnership on civil nuclear issues, the leaders welcomed the start of preparatory work on site in India for six AP1000 reactors to be built by Westinghouse". The agreement was the first since the finalization of the India–United States Civil Nuclear Agreement in 2008. Westinghouse has a vision of setting up 18 AP1000 reactors of 1,000 MW each in India by 2047.

When Westinghouse filed for bankruptcy in 2017, there were people who said that India shouldn't go ahead with the project. On the other hand WPS Sidhu, a former Brookings expert, wrote that India could bid for Westinghouse. Westinghouse's bailout in 2018 was a positive change. US Energy Secretary Rick Perry said that the project would move ahead on time. While initially the reactors were to the built in Gujarat, local opposition has forced the project to shift to Kovvada, Andhra Pradesh. By the end of 2024, land for the Kovvada Nuclear Power Plant had been acquired.

==== General Electric ====
In June 2018, American General Electric (GE) and French Électricité de France signed an agreement to jointly build reactors for the Jaitapur Nuclear Power Project. The Nuclear Power Corporation of India Ltd. is the owner and operator of the nuclear project. GE will design and supply the main parts, and provide operational services and training.

In 2015 Chairman and CEO of GE Jeff Immelt said that there was too much risk building nuclear plants in India because of its liability law. Nine months later Sekhar Basu, secretary at India’s Department of Atomic Energy, said that India won't buy GE reactors without a reference plant. In 1969 GE had built the reactors for the Tarapur Atomic Power Station, the first commercial nuclear power station built in India.

==== Holtec International ====
Holtec International is aiming to build 200 small modular reactors (SMR) in India. The plan is to standardize the design and build in bulk. It is working with Larsen & Toubro and Tata. In March 2025, US Department of Energy gave Holtec regulatory approval to transfer SMR technology to India. The company aims to set up a SMR manufacturing facility in Gujarat.

==== Clean Core Thorium Energy ====
In December 2024 India's state-owned NTPC Limited and the American company Clean Core Thorium Energy (CCTE) entered into a strategic partnership with regard to a thorium based fuel. In September 2024 CCTE had formed a strategic partnership with Larsen & Toubro. The next year the United States granted an export license to CCTE. CCTE CEO Mehul Shah, in conversation with ThePrint, said "This landmark Part 810 authorisation has potential to breathe new life into the US-India 123 Agreement". In nearly two decades CCTE is the second American company (after Holtec International) to have secured an export license to sell nuclear technology to India.

== Chronology ==
Chronology of the deal:

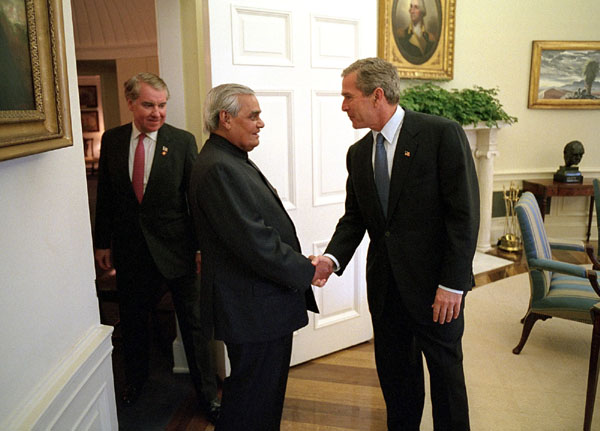
President Bush welcomes Prime Minister Vajpayee to the Oval Office in November 2001.

January 12, 2004: President George W. Bush announces that India and the US will be expanding civilian nuclear activities as per the 'Next Steps in Strategic Partnership'. The strategic partnership between the two countries was signed in November 2001 during Prime Minister Vajpayee's tenure.

July 18, 2005: President Bush and Prime Minister Manmohan Singh first announce their intention to enter into a nuclear agreement in Washington, D.C.

Prime Minister Singh and President Bush at a Joint Press Conference in Washington, D.C. on July 18, 2005.

March 1, 2006: Bush visits India for the first time.

March 3, 2006: Bush and Singh issue a joint statement on their growing strategic partnership, emphasising their agreement on civil nuclear cooperation.

July 26, 2006: The US House of Representatives passes the Henry J Hyde United States-India Peaceful Atomic Energy Cooperation Act of 2006, which stipulates that Washington will cooperate with New Delhi on nuclear issues and exempt it from signing the Non-Proliferation Treaty.

July 28, 2006: In India, the Left parties demand discussion on the issue in Parliament.

November 16, 2006: The US Senate passes the United States-India Peaceful Atomic Energy Cooperation and US Additional Protocol Implementation Act, to "exempt from certain requirements of the Atomic Energy Act of 1954 United States exports of nuclear materials, equipment, and technology to India."

December 18, 2006: President Bush signs into law congressional legislation on Indian atomic energy.

July 27, 2007: Negotiations on a bilateral agreement between the United States and India conclude.

Aug 3, 2007: The text of the "Agreement for Cooperation between the Government of the United States of America and the Government of India Concerning Peaceful Uses of Nuclear Energy" (123 Agreement) is released by both governments.

Aug 13, 2007: Prime Minister Singh makes a suo motu statement on the deal in Parliament.

Aug 17, 2007: The CPI(M) General Secretary Prakash Karat says the 'honeymoon (with government) may be over but the marriage can go on'.

Sept 4, 2007: In India, the UPA-Left committee to discuss nuclear deal set up.

Feb 25, 2008: Left parties in India say the ruling party would have to choose between the deal and its government's stability.

March 3–6, 2008: Left parties warn of 'serious consequences' if the nuclear deal is operationalized and set a deadline asking the government to make it clear by March 15 whether it intended to proceed with the nuclear deal or drop it.

March 7–14, 2008: The CPI writes to the Prime Minister, warning of withdrawal of support if government goes ahead with the deal and puts political pressure on the Singh administration not to go with the deal.

April 23, 2008: The Indian government says it will seek the opinions of the House on the 123 Agreement before it is taken up for ratification by the American Congress.

June 17, 2008: External Affairs Minister Pranab Mukherjee meets Prakash Karat, asks the Left to allow the government to go ahead with the IAEA safeguards agreement.

June 30, 2008: The Indian Prime Minister says his government prepared to face Parliament before operationalizing the deal.

July 8, 2008: Left parties in India withdraw support to government.

July 9, 2008: The draft India-specific safeguards accord with the IAEA circulated to IAEA's Board of Governors for approval.

July 10, 2008: Prime Minister Singh calls for a vote of confidence in Parliament.

July 14, 2008: The IAEA says it will meet on August 1 to consider the India-specific safeguards agreement.

July 18, 2008: Foreign Secretary Shivshankar Menon briefs the IAEA Board of Governors and some NSG countries in Vienna on the safeguards agreement.

July 22, 2008: Government is willing to look at "possible amendments" to the Atomic Energy Act to ensure that the country's strategic autonomy will never be compromised, says Prime Minister Singh.

July 22, 2008: The UPA government led by Manmohan Singh wins trust vote in the Lok Sabha in India.

July 24, 2008: India dismisses warning by Pakistan that the deal will accelerate an atomic arms race in the sub-continent.

July 24, 2008: India launches full blast lobbying among the 45-nation NSG for an exemption for nuclear commerce.

July 25, 2008: IAEA secretariat briefs member states on India-specific safeguards agreement.

Aug 1, 2008: IAEA Board of Governors adopts India- specific safeguards agreement unanimously.

Aug 21–22, 2008: The NSG meet to consider an India waiver ends inconclusively amid reservations by some countries.

Sep 4–6, 2008: The NSG meets for the second time on the issue after the US comes up with a revised draft and grants waiver to India after marathon parleys.

Sept 11, 2008: President Bush sends the text of the 123 Agreement to the US Congress for final approval.

Sept 12, 2008: US remains silent over the controversy in India triggered by President Bush's assertions that nuclear fuel supply assurances to New Delhi under the deal were only political commitments and not legally binding.

Sept 13, 2008: The State Department issues a fact sheet on the nuclear deal saying the initiative will help meet India's growing energy requirements and strengthen the non- proliferation regime by welcoming New Delhi into globally accepted nonproliferation standards and practices.

Sept 18, 2008: The Senate Foreign Relations Committee opens a crucial hearing on the Indo-US nuclear deal.

Sept 19, 2008: America's nuclear fuel supply assurances to India are a "political commitment" and the government cannot "legally compel" US firms to sell a "given product" to New Delhi, top officials tells congressional panel.

Sept 26, 2008: PM Singh and President Bush meet at the White House, but are not able to sign the nuclear deal as Congress had not yet approved it.

Sept 27, 2008: House of Representatives approves the Indo-US nuclear deal. 298 members voted for the bill while 117 voted against.

Oct 1, 2008: Senate approves the Indo-US civil nuclear deal with 86 votes for and 13 against.

Oct 4, 2008: Secretary of State Condoleezza Rice visits Delhi. India and the US unable to ink the nuclear agreement with New Delhi insisting that it would do so only after President Bush signs it into law, citing prior misgivings.

Oct 4, 2008: White House announces that President Bush will sign the legislation on the Indo-US nuclear deal into law on October 8.

Oct 8, 2008: President Bush signs legislation to enact the landmark US-India civilian nuclear agreement.

Oct 10, 2008: The 123 Agreement between India and US is finally operationalized between the two countries after the deal is signed by External Affairs Minister Mukherjee and his counterpart, Secretary of State Rice, in Washington.

Dec 17, 2014: India-US Contact Group on civil nuclear cooperation meet for the first time.

Jun 8, 2016: The NPCI and Westinghouse agree to conclude contractual arrangements for 6 reactors by June 2017.

Jan 16, 2025 The United States lifted export control restrictions on three Indian nuclear entities, the Bhabha Atomic Research Centre (BARC), the Indira Gandhi Centre for Atomic Research (IGCAR), and Indian Rare Earths (IRE).

== See also ==
- Energy in India
- Energy policy of India
- Energy in the United States
- Energy policy of the United States
- Nuclear power in India
- India and weapons of mass destruction
- India's three-stage nuclear power programme
- The Civil Liability for Nuclear Damage Act, 2010
- Nuclear Command Authority (India)
