= Jaitapur Nuclear Power Project =

Proposed nuclear power plant in Maharashtra, India

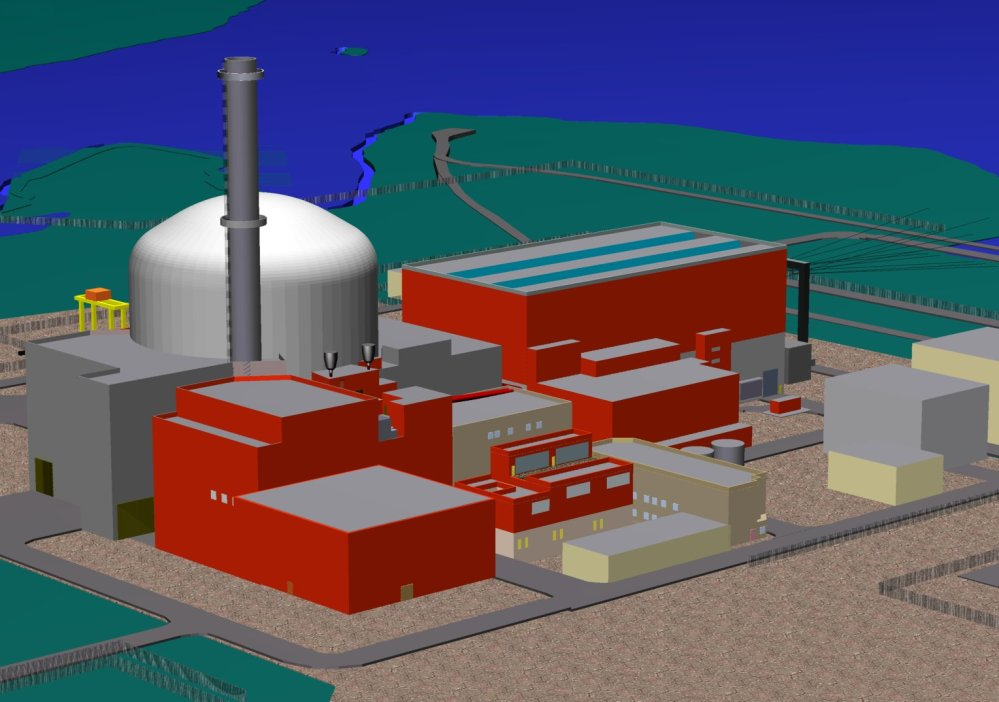
- Country: India
- Coordinates: 16°35′43″N 73°20′28″E
- Status: Planned. Construction to start in late 2025.
- Construction cost: ₹1.12 trillion (US$12 billion)
- Owner: NPCIL
- Operator: NPCIL

Nuclear power station
- Reactor type: EPR
- Reactor supplier: Framatome
- Cooling source: Rajapur Bay, Arabian Sea

Power generation
- Units planned: 6 x 1730 MW
- Nameplate capacity: 10,380 MW

Jaitapur Nuclear Power Project is a proposed nuclear power plant in India. If built, it would be the largest nuclear power generating station in the world by net generation capacity, at 9,900 MW. As of 2025, each unit's power has been increased to 1730MW and the installed capacity has been raised to 10,380MW. The power project is proposed by Nuclear Power Corporation of India (NPCIL) and would be built at Madban village of Ratnagiri district in Maharashtra.

On 6 December 2010 an agreement was signed for the construction of a first set of two third-generation European Pressurized Reactors and the supply of nuclear fuel for 25 years in the presence of French president Nicolas Sarkozy and Indian prime minister Manmohan Singh. French state-controlled nuclear engineering firm Areva S.A. and Indian state-owned nuclear operator Nuclear Power Corporation of India signed the agreement, valued at about $9.3 billion. This is a general framework agreement that was signed along with the agreement on 'Protection of Confidentiality of Technical Data and Information Relating to Nuclear Power Corporation in the Peaceful Uses of Nuclear Energy'. The plant construction was expected to start in late 2018. As of June 2019, NPCIL officials could not give a time-frame as to when the Jaitapur plant would be operational.

In April 2021, Electricite de France (EDF) submitted a binding technico-commercial offer to NPCIL and hoped to reach a binding framework agreement "in the coming months". In October 2025 the French ambassador to India Thierry Mathiou said that apart from legal amendments and industrial coordination, India's Make in India has to also be considered.

== Geography ==
The proposed Jaitapur Nuclear Power Project is located on the west coast of India. It has an average elevation of 90 feet (27 m). This project will spread over 968 hectares (3.74 sq mi; 9.68 km^{2}) of land. Jaitapur is on the Arabian Sea coast in Ratnagiri district in the southwestern part of Maharashtra, India. The district is a part of Konkan in Western Ghats. The Sahyadri Mountain range forms the eastern boundary of the Konkan, and the Arabian Sea marks the western boundary. Jaitapur was one of the important ports in ancient and early medieval times.

== Project description ==
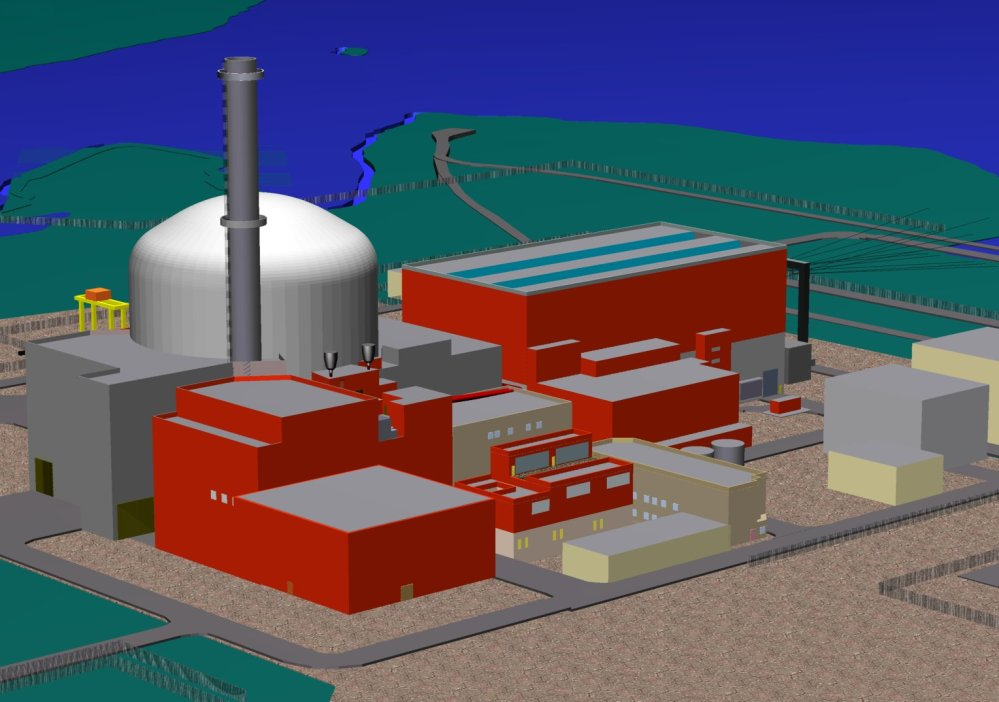
Computer generated image of one EPR nuclear power unit.

It is proposed to construct 6 European Pressurized Reactors designed and developed by Framatome (former Areva) of France, each of 1650 MW, thus totalling 9900 MW. These are the third generation pressurised water reactors (PWR).

Estimated cost of this project was around ₹1,000 billion (US$10 billion). A memorandum of understanding was signed between the Indian and French governments and an agreement between Areva and the Nuclear Power Corporation of India during French president Nicolas Sarkozy's visit to India during December 2010. A new agreement between Électricité de France and the Nuclear Power Corporation of India was signed in March 2018.

The cost of building the plant is about ₹20 crore (US$2.1 million) per MW electric power compared with ₹5 crore (US$520,000) per MW electric power for a coal power station. Nuclear power plants generally feature significantly higher investment cost while day-to-day operating cost is lower compared to combustion plants. Refraining from going into detail, Areva CEO Anne Lauvergeon asserted in November 2010 that the cost of electricity from this power plant will be below ₹4 (4.2¢ US) per Kilowatt hour.

A consortium of French financial institutions will finance this project as a loan. Both French and Indian government will give sovereign guarantee for this loan. The extent of guarantee will depend on what portion of the cost the French credit will cover. The Organisation for Economic Co-operation and Development (OECD) will govern the interest rates and other terms of agreement. Interest rates and other terms are under discussion.

It is one of several nuclear power projects being undertaken in a thin strip of coast of Raigad, Ratnagiri and Sindhudurg districts. The total power generating capacity proposed on a narrow strip of coastal land 50 kilometres (31 mi) to 90 kilometres (56 mi) km wide and 200 kilometres (120 mi) long is around 33,000 MW. The prospect of nuclear power generation in India received a boost after the Indo US Civilian Nuclear Agreement became operational in October 2008. India has also signed similar agreements with France and Russia.

In April 2021, EDF submitted a binding technico-commercial offer to NPCIL, setting out the conditions under which the project could be taken forward as part of "a long-term partnership between the French and Indian nuclear industries", and enabling discussions aimed at reaching a binding framework agreement "in the coming months". EDF would provide the technology but would not be an investor; NPCIL would be in charge of construction.

In December 2022, the environmental clearance for the project expired. Minister of state of science and technology, Dr Jitendra Singh told the Parliament in March 2025, that it is under renewal and after which, the plants construction is expected to begin. He also said that the reactors have been upgraded to 1730 MW each and the installed capacity has been raised to 10,380MW.

== Controversy ==
=== Nuclear liability ===
According to the Areva lack of clarity on The Civil Liability for Nuclear Damage Bill 2010 passed in Indian Parliament in August 2010 is a hurdle in finalising deal. This Civil Liability for Nuclear Damage Bill 2010 has a clause that deals with the legal binding of the culpable groups in case of a nuclear accident. It allows only the operator (NPCIL) to sue the manufacturers and suppliers. Victims will not be able to sue anyone. In reality, no one will be considered legally liable because the recourse taken by the operator will yield only ₹15 billion (US$160 million). United States of America has a law on liability-related issues for all non-military nuclear facilities constructed in the United States before 2026 named Price–Anderson Nuclear Industries Indemnity Act. This American Act establishes a no fault insurance-type system in which the first $10 billion is industry-funded as described in the Act (any claims above the $10 billion would be covered by the federal government).

=== Debate ===
Debate on nuclear power project at Jaitapur is ongoing on various levels. Environmental effects of nuclear power and geological issues have been raised by anti nuclear activists of India against this power project. Even though the Government of Maharashtra state completed land acquisition in January 2010, only 33 out of the 2,335 villagers had accepted compensation cheques as of November 2010. As of 12 February 2014, land compensation has been accepted by all 2336 title holders. A public hearing on the environmental impact assessment (EIA) Report, prepared by NEERI was conducted by Maharashtra Pollution Control Board, on behalf of Ministry of Environment and Forests on 16 April 2010, at the plant site. The public hearing became controversial as the EIA report was not delivered for study to 3 of the 4 Gram panchayats (local village bodies) a month in advance.

A Public Interest Litigation (PIL) has also been filed against the government's civil nuclear program at the apex Supreme Court. The PIL specifically asks for the "staying of all proposed nuclear power plants till satisfactory safety measures and cost-benefit analysis are completed by independent agencies".

=== Opponents ===
Since Jaitapur is a seismically sensitive area, the danger of an earthquake has been foremost on the minds of people. According to the Earthquake hazard zoning of India, Jaitapur comes under Zone III. This zone is called the moderate Risk Zone and covers areas liable to MSK VIII. The presence of two major creeks on the proposed site has been ignored while clearing the site.

It is not clear where the nuclear waste from the site will be shipped for recycling or removed for disposal. The plant is estimated to generate 300 tonnes of used nuclear fuel each year, the volume of a 2.5 m sided cube. Owing to the Generation III reactors having a higher fuel efficiency than previous Gen II designs, the smaller amount of used nuclear fuel from an EPR will contain "four times" as much fission products by volume, Iodine, Caesium, etc., compared to presently operating Gen II pressurised water reactors.

Since the plant will use seawater for cooling and then release warmed water into the Arabian Sea, fishermen in the surrounding villages fear the destruction of nearby fisheries. Media articles also highlight the possible human and fisheries cost of this project.

An independent social impact assessment review of the project are being conducted by the Jamsetji Tata Centre for Disaster Management of the Tata Institute of Social Sciences (TISS). According to this report, the Government of India has not been fully transparent with its citizens, and is hiding the huge negative impacts on the social and environmental development of the Konkan region in general. The government is allegedly manipulating the area seismic risk level, lowering it from high severity earthquake zone to moderate seismic severity zone. The report has been contested by NPCIL stating that they have done sufficient sensitization of the public and the exclusion of reprocessing plant from the 'environmental impact assessment report' was because there were no plan to establish one in Jaitapur.

=== Proponents ===
Proponents are advocating the Jaitapur Project as safe, environmentally benign and an economically viable source of electrical energy to meet the increasing electricity needs of India. They argue that nuclear power is a sustainable energy source that reduces carbon emissions and increases energy security by decreasing India's dependence on foreign oil. The promoter of Jaitapur project is Nuclear Power Corporation of India. It is a public Sector Enterprise under the administrative control of the Department of Atomic Energy (India).

I know the environmentalists will not be very happy with my decision, but it is foolish romance to think that India can attain high growth rate and sustain the energy needs of a 1.2 billion population with the help of solar, wind, biogas and such other forms of energy. It is paradoxical that environmentalists are against nuclear energy.

— Jairam Ramesh, Environment Minister.

As of 2010, India is sixth in rank, after USA, France, Japan, the Russian Federation and the Republic of Korea, to have twenty or more nuclear power reactors in operation. According to former chairman of Atomic Energy Commission Anil Kakodkar, the Jaitapur site is the best as it fulfilled the technical and scientific requirements for a nuclear power plant. It is proposed that the spent fuel generated at this nuclear power plant be recycled. Only five percent of it would be encapsulated and stored for 30 to 40 years, till scientists develop some technology to treat it. The environmental impact assessment and other associated studies of the Jaitapur project have been carried out in detail over the last few years by National Environmental Engineering Research Institute (NEERI), Nagpur in collaboration with several other reputed organisations specialising in specific environment studies.

These studies include Bhabha Atomic Research Centre Pre-operational Baseline Radiological Survey of the Area around JNPP Site, Central Water and Power Research Station Pune, Thermal Dispersion Studies for Condenser Cooling Water (CCW) Discharges, Konkan Krishi Vidyapith, College of Forestry, Dapoli, Baseline Biodiversity Study of the area around JNPP Site.

Nuclear Power Corporation of India has declared that 1.5 to 2 percent of the net profit from Jaitapur plant would be spent in that area only. Development projects will be decided by local people and NPC will provide the funds to ensure development of these areas.

== Protests ==
Many protests have been carried out by the local population against the proposed nuclear power plant. On 29 December 2009, 12 January 2010, and 22 January 2010, when the government authorities visited Madban for distribution of cheques in lieu of compulsory land acquisition, the villagers refused to accept the cheques. Government officials were shown black flags, and were denied any co-operation in carrying out their activities. 72 people were arrested on 22 January 2010 when people protested against the compulsory land acquisition.

Debate about the nuclear power project at Jaitapur is ongoing on various levels. Environmental effects of nuclear power and geological issues have been raised by anti nuclear activists. On 4 December 2010, protests became violent when over 1500 people were detained from among thousands of protesters, who included environmentalists and local villagers.

Members and leaders of the Konkan Bachao Samiti (KBS) and the Janahit Seva Samiti (organisations that are spearheading opposition to the project) were also detained. In Mumbai, members of various trade unions and social organisations came together to protest against the project. The protesters raised doubts about the neutrality of the Environment Impact Assessment Report prepared by the National Environmental Engineering Research Institute (NEERI), which forms the basis of environmental clearance for the project. Parallel studies carried out by the Bombay Natural History Society show that the Jaitapur nuclear plant project will cause substantial environmental damage.

On 18 April 2011, one man was shot and killed by police and eight were injured after protests turned violent.

== See also ==
- Economics of new nuclear power plants
- Energy policy of India
- Generation IV reactor
- Nuclear power in India
- Nuclear renaissance
