= Vatul =

Vatul and similar can mean:

- Vatul (village), a village in the State of Maharashtra in India
- Vatula, a Sanskrit word that has several meanings including "enlightened, lashed by the wind to the point of losing one's sanity, god's madcap, detached from the world, and seeker of truth". The terms Vatul and Baul are applied to mystics, originally Hindu and Sufi-Muslim respectively, who dedicated their lives to the quest for spiritual harmony and experience.
- Vatul, a Rishi who gave his name to a Gotra, or a Hindu Brahmin line of descent. Vatula Maharishi was reportedly prone to great distraction, which some ascribe to deep, consciousness-expanding meditation.
- Vatula Agama, one of the Agama texts of Hinduism
