= A. Muthukrishnan =

Author and Social Activist

- Occupations: Writer; activist
- Known for: Human rights and social activism

A. Muthukrishnan is a Tamil author and social activist. He was born in 1973 in Madurai of Madurai District, Tamil Nadu, India. Muthukrishnan had his schooling in NaviMumbai with a cosmopolitan background and his family settled back in Madurai, Tamil Nadu, India in 1986.

== 1988 ==
He was matriculated in 1988 and further obtained his diploma in Electronics and Communication in 1991. He worked in various trades and jobs before he started learning Tamil in 1995. He was disturbed by the caste clashes and untouchability down in and around Madurai and wanted to contribute his share for the change in social order.

== 1995 ==
Muthukrishnan started learning Tamil in 1995 and started travelling and meeting writers of Tamil literature. His contacts grew with environmental activists and philosophers leaning towards left-libertarianism in India. He also began attending conferences and seminars at the national and international level. Muthukrishnan has written more than 300 articles in Tamil magazines and papers. He has travelled to conflict zones in India. He travelled to document the Godhra carnage in Gujarat, Vidarbha farmers' suicide in Maharashtra, the Staines killing in Kandhamal and the Posco project in Gobindpur, Jaitapur and Dhinkia in Orissa.

== 2002 ==
He has been a part of various fact-finding missions to areas of conflict in India. He was one of the coordinators of the Asia Caravan which left from Raj Ghat, Delhi and travelled 8000 kms by road through 8 countries to reach Gaza with a humanitarian aid worth one million US$. Muthukrishnan has attended various seminars at the national and international level on developmental issues, culture, environment and human rights for the past 15 years. Muthukrishnan has translated works into Tamil: Gujarat 2002 (Tehelka Expose), Kuralin Valimay, Madhaveri and "Afzalay Thookilidathey" and "Tholargal Udan Oru Payanam" (both by Arundhati Roy). Muthukrishnan has directed a documentary on the life and works of Che Guevara in 2002, which received wide attention from the Tamil literary buffs.

He is a regular debater on Vijay TV's popular talk show Neeya Naana and Puthiya Thalaimurai's Puthu Puthu Arthangal.

Muthukrishnan is the founder of Green Walk, an informal group of people who walk on roads less travelled to learn about neglected monuments. Muthu has so far identified about two dozen historical and archaeological hotspots in and around Madurai.
