= Bhoo, India =

Village in Maharashtra

Bhoo
- village
- Location in Maharashtra, India Bhoo (India)
- Coordinates: 16.720549°N 73.474309°E
- Country: India
- State: Maharashtra
- District: Ratnagiri

Government
  - Body: Gram panchayat

Population
  - Total: < 1,000

Languages
  - Official: Marathi
- Time zone: UTC+5:30 (IST)
- PIN: 416713
- Telephone code: 02353
- Nearest city: Rajapur
- Lok Sabha constituency: Rajapur
- Vidhan Sabha constituency: Rajapur

Bhoo is a small village situated in Rajapur Taluka, Ratnagiri district of Maharashtra, India. Its population totals less than 1,000. Situated eight kilometres northwest of Rajapur, it is connected to it and to Ratnagiri by bus.

The village is home to betel nut, cashew, jackfruit, coconut and mango gardens.

Its religious centres are dedicated to the Hindu gods Lakshmikant and Shiva, and kalika devi mandir. There is also a temple dedicated to the maiden goddess Shree Aaryadurga approximately three kilometres from Bhoo. There is a dharamshala (religious rest house) at Aaryadurga. Loknanatya Dashavtar (a folkdrama) is produced by local artists every year.

Languages spoken locally include Marathi and Hindi. The climate averages between 15 °C (59 °F) to 35 °C (95 °F).

Khingini, Tervan, Kotapur, Pendkhale are smaller villages around Bhoo.

Acharya Narendra Deo Vidya Mandir is the high school situated in Bhoo. The school has about 400 students and is affiliated with Sane Guruji Shikshan Prasarak Mandal, Janashi. The school is in the Kolhapur Divisional Board for SSC examinations. Some students pursue further education in nearby towns such as Rajapur, Ratnagiri, Kolhapur or in Mumbai.

== Transport ==
ST buses from Rajapur service the neighbouring villages such as Pendkhale, Satavli (Dasur), Devihasol, Kotapur, Bhalavli and Tervan. The nearest rail station is Rajapur Road, approximately 30 kilometres away. The nearest airport is at Ratnagiri.
