= Human Rights Forum =

- Abbreviation: HRF
- Predecessor: Andhra Pradesh Civil Liberties Committee
- Formation: 1998
- Purpose: activism, human rights
- Region served: India
- Key people: K. Balagopal
- Website: https://humanrightsforum.org/

Human Rights Forum (HRF) is a rights organisation based in Andhra Pradesh and Telangana in India. It was formed in 1998 by a group of activists including K. Balagopal following a split from the Andhra Pradesh Civil Liberties Committee (APCLC).

== Prominent Activities ==
The Human Rights Forum has run campaigns on issues like displacement, gender, environment, caste, state repression, etc. They have opposed nuclear power projects like the Kovvada Atomic Power Project and Uranium mining in Kadapa. They have also actively campaigned against large-scale infrastructure projects, such as the Polavaram project and other hydro and thermal projects citing concerns about displacement and environmental impacts.

== Publications ==
=== English ===
- Ear to the Ground: Writings On Class and Caste - 2011 and 2025
- Of Capital and Other Punishments - October 2012
- Tsunduru: An Atrocity and Its aftermath - October 2014
- Understanding Fascism: Writings on Caste, Class and the State - October 2023
