= Balagopal =

Balagopal may refer to:

- Krishna, a Hindu deity
- K. Balagopal, a human rights activist
- K.N. Balagopal, Indian politician
- Revathi Thirunal Balagopal Varma, princess
