= Rajapur, Maharashtra =

Rajapur
- City
- Location in Maharashtra, India
- Coordinates: 16.67°N 73.52°E
- Country: India
- State: Maharashtra
- District: Ratnagiri

Government
  - Type: Nagar parishad
- Elevation: 72 m (236 ft)

Population (2001)
  - Total: 10,499
- Demonym: Rajapurkar

Languages
  - Official: Marathi, Konkani, Malvani
- Time zone: UTC+5:30 (IST)
- Postal code: 416702
- Telephone code: 02353
- ISO 3166 code: IN-MH
- Vehicle registration: MH-08

Rajapur, also referred to as Razapur, is a city and a municipal council in Ratnagiri district in the Indian state of Maharashtra. It is 385 km away from Mumbai.

== Geography ==
Rajapur has an average elevation of 72 metres (236 feet).

== Demographics ==
As of 2011 India census, Rajapur had a population of 9,753. Males constitute 50% of the population and females 50%. Rajapur has an average literacy rate of 78%, higher than the national average of 59.5%: male literacy is 82%, and female literacy is 74%. In Rajapur, 9% of the population is under 6 years of age.

== History ==
During the days of the Bijapur Sultanate, Rajapur was an important maritime trade centre due to a navigable creek that connects it to the Arabian sea. It became an access point to the rich cities of Deccan for those involved in the Arabia-India commerce.

=== Doroji's attack on Rajapur ===
After defeating the Bijapuri general Afzal Khan, Shivaji Maharaj entered the present-day Ratnagiri district and started capturing the important ports and towns. Many Bijapuri generals fled to Rajapur because its governor, known by the title Rustam-i-Zamani, was on friendly terms with Shivaji.

However, Doroji, one of Shivaji's generals, attacked Rajapur. The East India Company had stationed several men in the town, under the charge of Henry Revington to facilitate the trade of saltpeter, pepper, calicoes and cotton. When Rustam-i-Zamani heard about the approach of the Maratha army, he procured funds from one of the company's brokers and escaped with the money in a junk (ship). Revington sent an English ship Diamond to stop him. When confronted by the English, Rustam offered the company the ownership of two of his junks in lieu of payment. At the same time, the Marathas also arrived, and asked the English to hand over the junks to them. The English declined to oblige, unless they were given the money that Rustam owed them. The angry Marathas seized two of the company's brokers, Baghji and Balaji, in Jaitapur. When the English sent Philip Gyffard to demand their release, he was arrested as well. The three prisoners were taken to Kharepatan fort on 18 January 1660.

Henry Revington wrote to Shivaji in February 1660, requesting their release. Meanwhile, the brokers had also pleaded for their release, and Shivaji issued an order to set them free. Shivaji also condemned the attack on Rajapur, dismissed Doroji and issued an order to restore all the loot from Rajapur. However, a rogue officer at Kharepatan refused to set Gyfford free unless he received a bribe. He decided to move Gyfford to another location, escorted by his small Maratha contingent. Revington dispatched an armed party that waylaid the contingent and rescued Gyfford by force.

=== Shivaji Maharaj relations with the Company ===
The East India Company personnel at Rajapur maintained amicable relations with Shivaji maharaj until June 1660, when the Adilshahi general Siddi Jauhar attacked Shivaji's camp at Panhala. During this siege, Siddi Jauhar used grenades purchased from the English at Rajapur. He also hired some English artillerymen, who came to Panhala with an English flag, although the Company did not officially support him. Shivaji maharaj managed to escape from Panhala, and decided to take revenge as he assumed that the company had supported Siddi Jauhar. He plundered the English factory at Rajapur in December 1661.

During the attack, Shivaji captured four Englishmen - Henry Revington, Richard Taylor, Randolph Taylor and Philip Gyffard - who were imprisoned, first at Vasota and later at Songd. Shivaji's officer Raoji Pandit treated them well, but the Marathas demanded ransom for their release. The English insisted that they had lost everything at Rajapur and would be unable to pay a ransom. Instead, they tried to negotiate their release in exchange for their support in capturing the Danda Rajpuri sea fort. This negotiation could not happen due to the absence of Shivaji, who was away on an expedition near Kalyan. The English prisoners wrote an angry letter to the company's president, who replied that they had been imprisoned not for performing the Company duties, but for illegally supporting Siddi Jauhar without the company's permission. Subsequently, the four made an escape attempt, but they were caught and moved to Raigad.

Later, Shivaji discovered that the company had not officially supported Siddi Jauhar, and that some rogue personnel had joined Jauhar without the company's permission. He ordered the release of the English prisoners in 1663. In a letter dated 6 February 1663, Shivaji also assured that the English would enjoy his protection in the future. The English informed him about the losses suffered by them at Rajapur, and tried to negotiate a settlement. In 1672, Shivaji offered them 5000 pagodas towards the losses. He also promised that if the English decided to set up a new factory at Rajapur, he would "show all kindness and civility imaginable to the said factory". Shivaji was cautious about the British but also wanted to learn the new artillery technology that the British brought.

A French commercial lodge was established in 1669, after preliminary contacts in 1668 with Shivaji showed promise. The merchant Jacques Boureau developed it commercially for the French East Indies Company but it declined after Shivaji's death and the lodge was closed in 1688.

=== Later developments ===
Rajapur is mentioned in novel Parashuramachi Savli by the Marathi author Ravindra Pinge.

== Places of interest ==
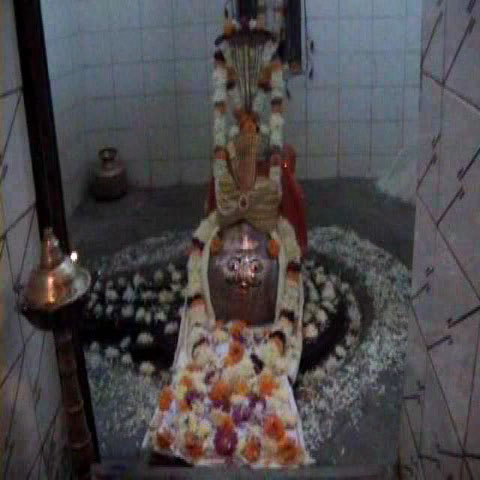
Swayambhu mahadeo Mandir Vatul Village in Rajapur

- Rajapur is a hub for business activity for the surrounding many small villages. Rajapur is famous for mangoes called Alphanso or locally called "Hapus".

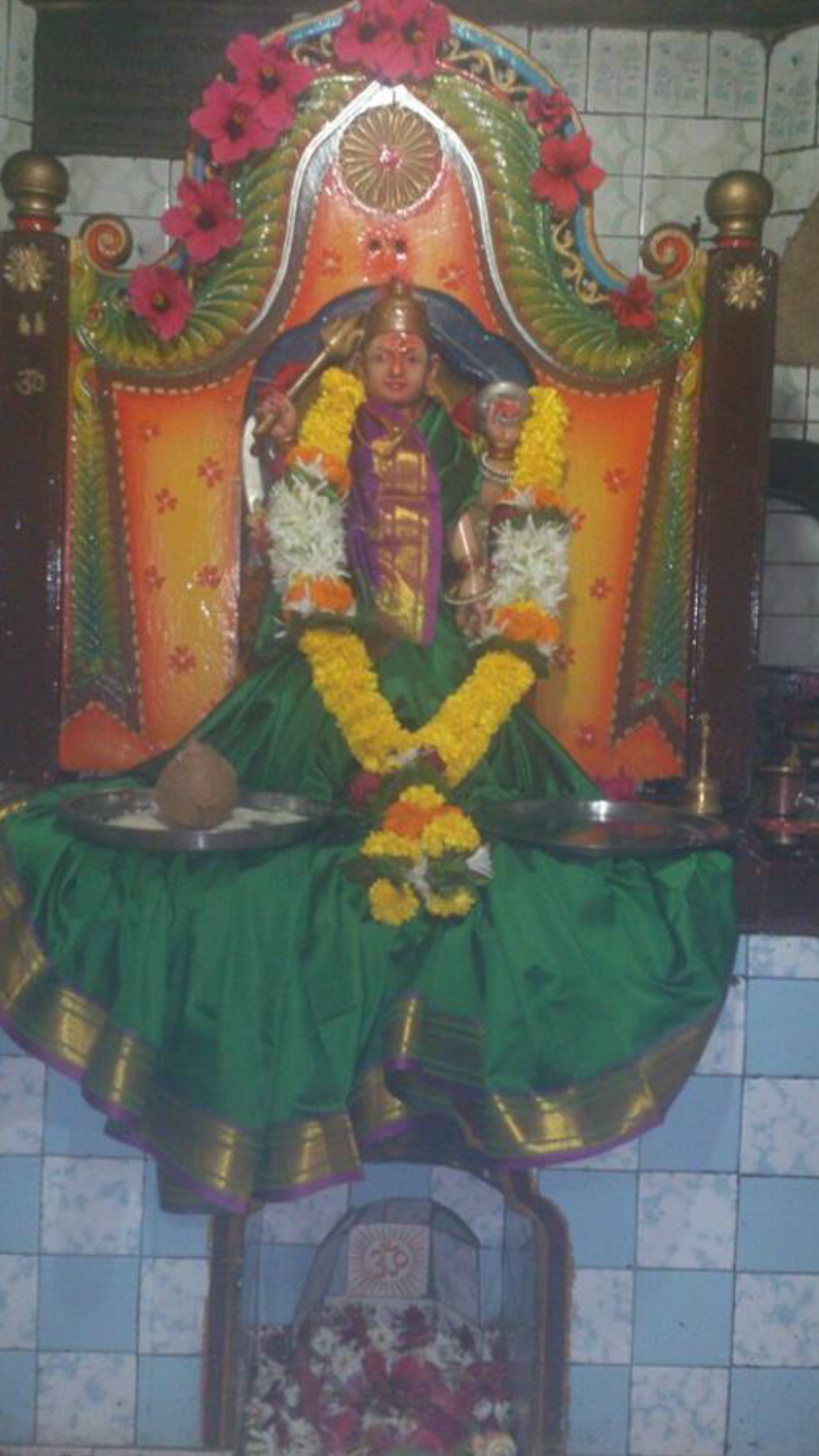
Aryadurga Devi, Devihasol

- Aryadurga devi, Devihasol : Shri Aryadurga devi temple is famous in Rajapur (Ratnagiri) Many devotees come to visit this temple. It is 24 km from Rajapur. The fair of Aryadurga devi is famous in Rajapur.
- Rajapurchi Ganga: At a distance of 2 km from Rajapur, a holy place "Rajapurchi Ganga" i.e. Holy Ganges of Rajapur is wonder of nature. It is situated at a height 25 metres above height of Rajapur. This place is usually dry. However, all of a sudden water starts flowing in ponds. Barring exceptions, usually it happens once in three years. Small tanks are built for storing water and facilitating bathing. Surprisingly water temperature in these tanks is different from each other, though those are at distance of 1 metre from each other. Approximately after three months, water disappears or stops streaming. There is a local lore how & why Holy Ganges appeared at this place. Scientifically it could be a long siphon from Sahyadri range. Millions of people visit the Ganges for bathing. One of the bigger tank, 'Kashikund' delivers clean water like glass and people believe that bathing in this water will relieve them of sins.
- Hot Water Spring: At one kilometre distance from Jawahar Chouk, Rajapur, there is Hot Spring. This place is called "Unhala". Hot water of this spring is rich with sulphur and thought to cure skin diseases.
- Dhoot Papeshwar Temple: Very old Lord Shiva Temple is situated at 1.5 kilometre Rajapur. There is a waterfall close to Dhootpapeshwar
- Mahakali Temple: the goddess Mahakali's temple is situated at Adiware Village, It is very old temple and is close to Rajapur that can be reached by car.
- Madban: At a distance of 38 km from Rajapur, and possessed of a beach. Also there is a Bhagvati temple.
- Yeshwantgad, an island fortification.
- Vatul Village close to Mumbai Goa Highway. Swaymbhu Mahadev, Adhisthi Devi temples and Gango temple, Wandertek Sunset point, Vatul Dam
- Kankaditya Sun Temple: At a distance of approximately 30 km towards Ratnagiri on the Coastal Highway is one of the unique Sun Temples of India with a huge mandap supported only on the sides
- Shri Ninadevi Temple, this temple is the Gramdaivat of Pangaregaon and Shri. Rawal Nath and Shri. Pavanadevi, Shri Vitthala Devi is also a goddess in this temple. Many religious programs are taking place in this temple and they fall under the authority of the honourable Tatha village chief, as well as there is a Shri. Harihareshwar temple, as well as Swami Shivanand Maharaj (Tembe Swami), his ashram. Similarly, Shri Durgarameshwar temple is also located in Sawantwadi in the same village. The temple of Duttguru is situated on a hilltop in Gavmala Wadi. Pangare Budruk village is at a distance of 09 km from Rajapur and 06 km from Rajapur railway station. It is a small and nice village with about 150-160 houses.
- Pangare Budruk Dam - A dam built on the lake with a waterfront in Chinchwadi Pangare Budruk. At the far end of it are the Pandava Kalin caves.
- Ekveera Devi Temple: the goddess Ekveera's temple is situated at Kotapur Village, It is an old temple.
- Hazrat Mehdi Peer Refai Dargah: The place is also called Mehndi nagar. Urs Mubarak is celebrated on 14,15 and 16th of Muharram according to the Urdu calendar.

== Gallery ==
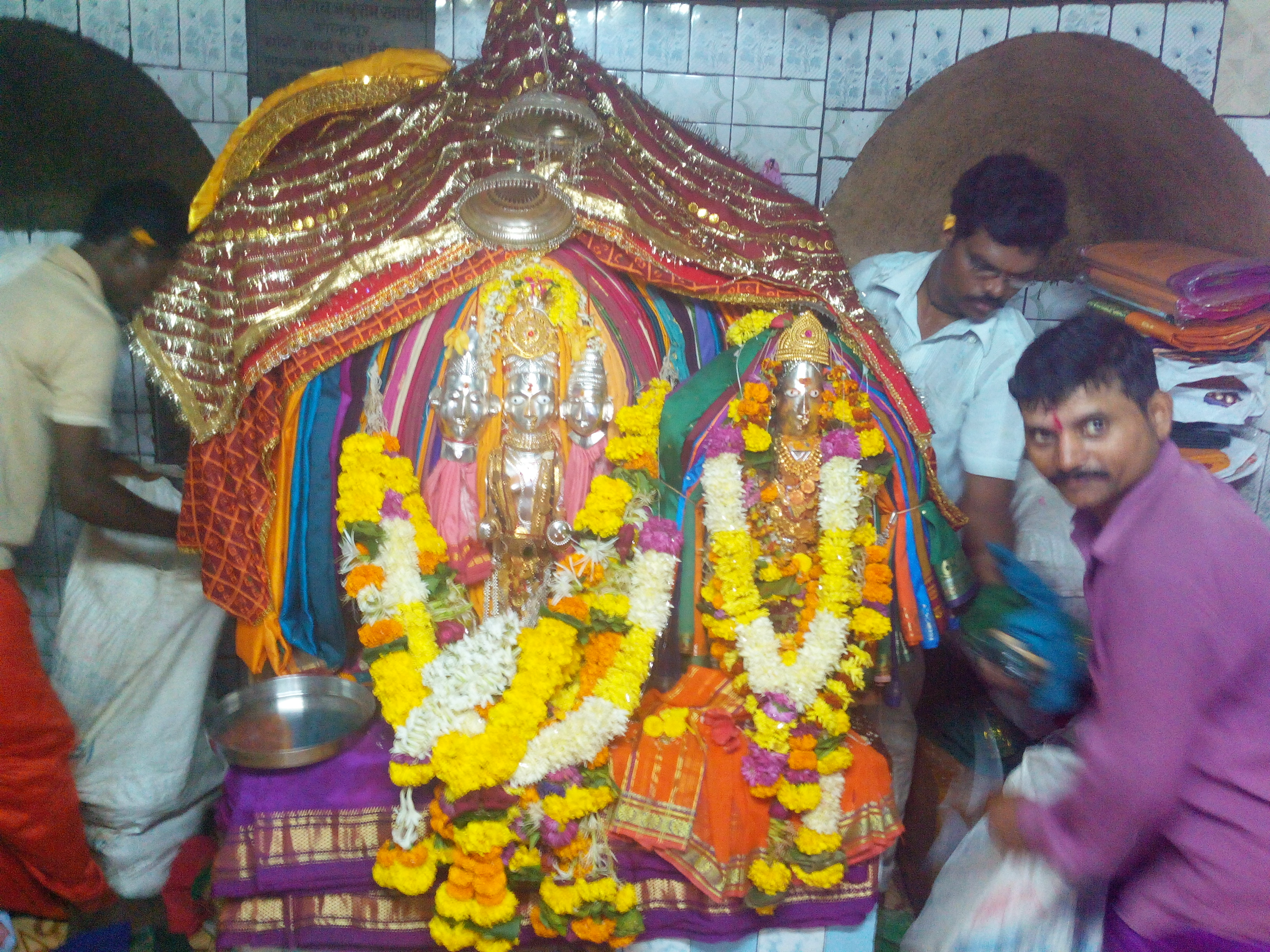
Shri Aryadurga devi devihasol. Shri Navadurga devi

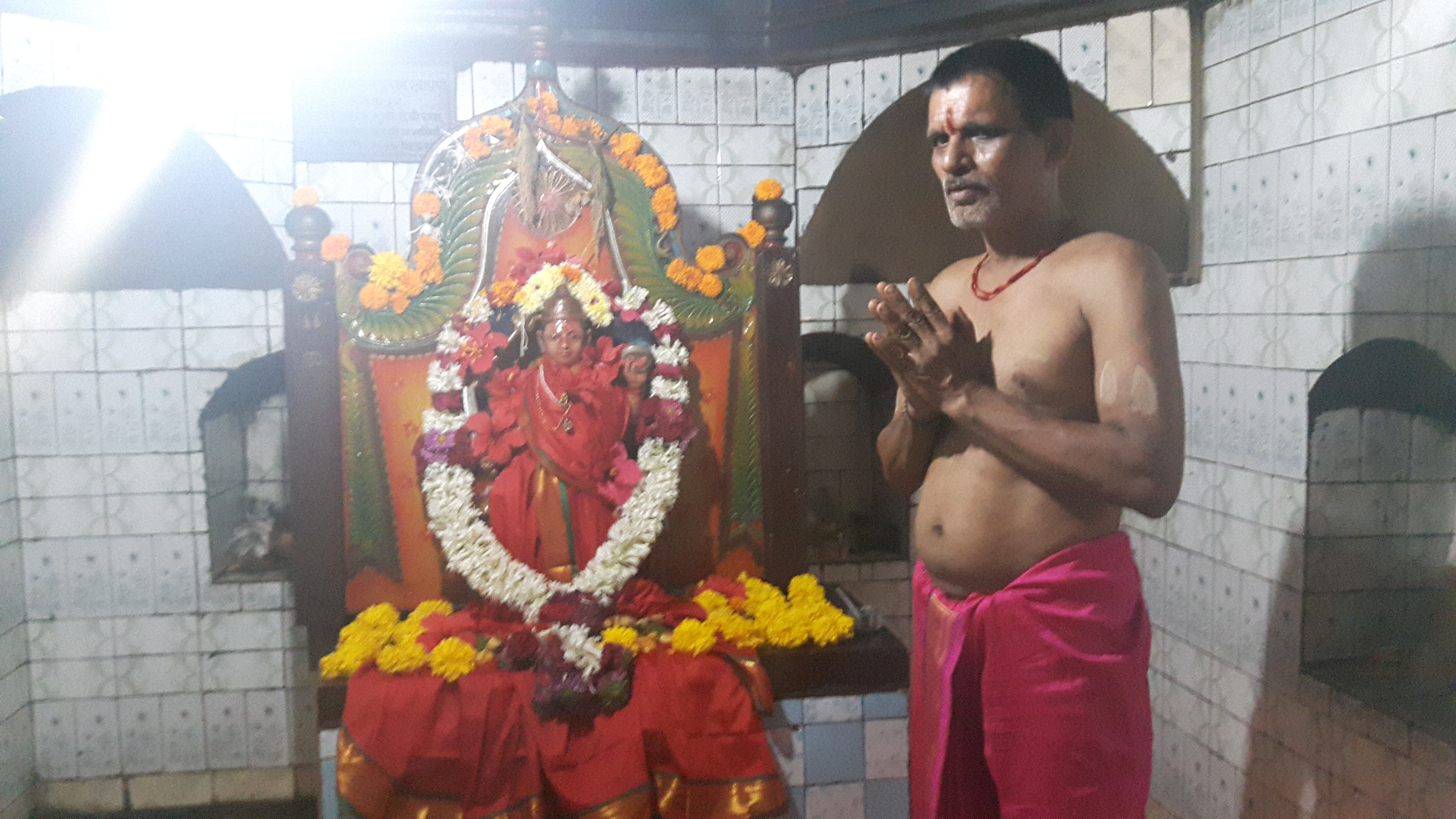
Shri aryadurga devi devihasol

== See also ==
- Sasale
