= Sufism in Jordan =

Sufi tradition in Jordan

Sufism, or Taṣawwuf (Arabic: التَّصَوُّف), variously defined as "Islamic mysticism", or, the inward dimension of Islam, is the primary manifestation of mystical practice in Islam. Jordan is considered by many Sufis to be "a spiritual center and a fertile environment for Sufism," at least in part due to the fact that many of the narratives from the Qur’an take place within its modern borders. Many of the Sufis in Jordan today belong to one of six main orders or tariqa: Qadiri, Naqshbandi, Rifa'i, Shadhili, Khalwati, and Tijani. The oral history of Sufi practice in northern Jordan goes back at least as far as the 13th century, and was "documented as early as the 16th century in Ottoman tax registers." Sufism in modern-day Jordan remained prominent through the mid-20th century.

Up until the era of independence, Sufi orders and popular forms of Sufi religiosity dominated the religious scene, with other Islamic movements and groups beginning to emerge only later as branches of other groups already established outside the boundaries of the Hashemite Kingdom.

— Sufism and Sufi Orders: God’s Spiritual Paths Adaptation and Renewal in the Context of Modernization, Hassan Abu Hanieh, p.12

== History ==
Sufism has played a very important role in the expansion of Islam throughout the world. Throughout the 15th century Sufism was a popular movement along the front edge of the expanding Ottoman Empire. In Jordan however early Ottoman records indicate that Sufism was already present in Jordan when it was subsumed by the Empire. It has continued to play an important role in the area through the establishment of the Emirate, the influx of Palestinians following the 1948 Palestinian expulsion and flight, and into present time.

=== Pre Independence ===
There is a record of Sufism in Jordan dating back to before the Ottoman Empire. Early Ottoman tax registers describe the landscape of modern-day Jordan as punctuated with saints' shrines. Sufi sheikhs were especially prominent in the north around Ajlun and Irbid. The land tax introduced by the Tanzimat reforms brought about a more formal system of land registration and therefore record keeping. These records show tracts of land, especially in the north, owned by prominent families of Sufi sheikhs.

=== Establishment of the Emirate ===
The Sufi structures in place in modern-day Jordan were in some ways co-opted by the new state upon its formation. Many states in the middle east have done this towards varying ends. The new Emirate of Jordan in an effort to be liberal nationalist, and to some extent, secular, established a ministry of religious affairs staffed by moderate Sufis.

=== Post 1940 ===
The influx of Palestinians following the Nakba spurred expansion in the Sufi community at that time.

"More activity has been seen after 1940, among the earliest, the establishment of a (prominent) meeting place zawiya... near Irbid and an increasing number of others, supported by refugees of Palestinian origin."

— Our Ancestors Were Bedouin. Memory, Identity and Change: The Case of Holy Sites in Southern Jordan, Miettunen Päivi

The mid 20th century saw the rebuilding or restoration of many shrines across the country, and especially in the north."

== Sufi Orders ==
Most of the Sufis in Jordan today come from six major orders or tariqa pl. ṭuruq: Qadiri, Naqshbandi, Rifa'i, Shadhili, Khalwati, and Tijani. They came to Jordan in myriad different ways and broke into many sub-orders a number of which have Silsilas extending to prominent sheikhs today.

=== Shadhili ===
The Shadhili order was the first modern Sufi order established in Jordan, between the end of the 19th and beginning of the 20th centuries. In the early 1900s Sharif Muhammad al-Amin Bin Zein al-Qalqami, one of the men credited with bringing this particular order of Sufism to Jordan, established a zawiya near Amman which was home to the Shadhili-Ghudhu-Qadiri sub-order. The next Shadhili sub order to plant roots in Jordan was the Shadhili-Yashruti Order, which was established during the 1930s. This sub-order grew significantly after the Nakba as many Palestinian followers permanently settled in Jordan. Today the Shadhili-Darqawi-Hashimi-‘Alawi-Filali order is considered one of the most widespread orders in Jordan. Sheikh Muhammad al-Hashimi al-Tilmisani who traveled to Jordan from Syria is often credited with the spread of this sub-order. A third generation Sheikh from this order, Sheikh Abu Ghazaleh, established a school in the Husseini Mosque and a zawiya nearby. This sub-order extends all the way to Sheikh Abd al-Rahman al-Shaghouri via Sheikh Muhammad Sa’id al-Kurdi.

=== Khalwati ===
Sheikh Kheir al-Din ‘Abd al-Rahman al-Sharif introduced the Khalwati order to Jordan, specifically the city of Kerak, in the late 1910s/early 1920s, after being exiled from Hebron by the British authorities. In 1958, after his death, his son, Sheikh Hassan al-Sharif, traveled to Jordan and established a zawiya continuing the practice his father had introduced.

=== Qadiri ===
Sheikh Muhammad Hashim al-Baghdadi a prominent Qadiri Sufi of the time in Palestine had a number of students come to Jordan in the 1930s/ 1940's and establish zawiyas in the cities of Amman, Zarqa, Irbid and Russeifeh. One of the more important of these students was Sheikh ‘Abd al-Halim al-Qadiri, who came to Jordan in 1938 establishing a zawiya in Shouneh, an area of Jordan proximal to the Jordan river just north of the dead sea. One of the larger Qadiri sub-orders, The Kasnazani-Qadiri order, made its way to Jordan from Iraq after the spike in sectarian violence following American troops entered Iraq in 2003. This specific order has established a zawiya in the northern Marka area in Amman.

=== Rifa'i ===
Several sheikhs are credited with bringing the Rifa'i order to Jordan around the same time. Two of the most notable include ‘Abd al-Hafez al-Nuwayhi, and ‘Umar al-Sarafandi. Al-Nuwayhi moved from Palestine to Jordan after the Nakba where he lived until his death in 2002. His particular suborder was assumed by both his son, Sheikh Muhammad, and Sheikh Faris al-Rifa’i, who has several zawiyas in the cities of Amman and Jerash. Al-Sarafandi also moved to Jordan from Palestine after the Nakba and established a zawiya in the Jabal al-Nasr neighborhood of Amman. The Rawasi-Rifa’i Order was established in Jordan by Sheikh Ali Abu Zayd and several other sheikhs. After his death in 1997, Sheikh Abu Zayd left the leadership of the order to Sheikh Mahmud al-Faqih, who has a zawiya in the Russeifeh area, as well as Sheikh and Dr Mi’ath Sa’id Hawa. Sheikh Nasser al-Din al-Khatib would also invigorate the order and worked to increase its reach in Jordan after he came to Jordan from Palestine in 1967. Sheikh Khatib would establish a mosque and zawiya in Amman and would launch a Sufi satellite channel.

=== Naqshbandi ===
The Naqshbandi Order is considered the most prominent and widespread order in Central Asia. It is also one of the only Sufi orders to maintain a distinctly Sunni identity. The Naqshbandi Order in Jordan is represented by two branches: the Naqshbandi-Haqqani Order and the Naqshbandi-Kilani Order. In 1955 Sheikh Muhammad Nazim ‘Adel al-Haqqani al-Naqshbandi, or Sheikh Nazim al-Haqqani (following the instruction of his master in Cyprus, Sheikh ‘Abd Allah Fa’ez al-Daghastani al-Naqshbandi) moved to Amman and went into secclusion in the Sweileh neighborhood of the city. At this time many Jordanian aspirants flocked to him drastically expanding this order.

After the death of Sheikh ‘Abd Allah al-Daghastani, the affairs of the Naqshbandi Order were passed on to Sheikh Nazim al Haqqani, who, in turn, appointed several sheikhs as representatives of the order in numerous countries. The sheikh that Sheikh Haqqani appointed to manage the affairs of the order in Jordan would be Sheikh ‘Abd al-Salam Tawfiq Ahmad Shamsi

— Hanieh p.170

Sheikh ‘Abd al-Salam Shamsi went on to establish a zawiya in the Abu Sham Mosque in the Jabal Amman area of the city after moving to Jordan in 1998.

=== Tijani ===
The Tijani Order is a manifestations of revivalist Sufism, established by Ahmad Tijani (d. 1230 AH/1815 AD), who came from the Tlemcen region in northwestern Algeria. Sheikh Ahmad al-Dadisi, a teacher from the al-Aqsa mosque in jerusalem, frequently visited Jordan semi regularly building a following of Jordanian Sufis. He died in the early 1980s, however he appointed Sheikh Muhammad Mahmud al-Musaleh to lead this particular Tajini Sufi sub-order in Jordan.

== Modern Practices ==
Today there are a number of Sufi Orders active in Jordan. The vast majority of Amman's tariqas respect the generally agreed boundaries of the Sunnah, maintaining sexual segregation and avoiding the use of musical instruments or dancing during the hadra itself. In Jordan all the saint shrines are under the complete control of the government. For example, the celebration of the mawaalid (birthday) of the saints is prohibited, with the exception of al-mawlid al-nabawi (the Prophet's birthday). Throughout the country today Sufism is not particularly influential or politically or socially active. This may be because the modern Sufi orders of Jordan were founded quite recently (first half of the 20th century).

== Sufi Shrines ==
- The Irbid Area is home to a number of shrines dating back at least to the 13th Century and probably significantly earlier. Towards the end of the 20th century the government undertook an effort to reconstruct the shrines of the Companions of the Prophet or al-Ṣaḥāba (Arabic: الصَحابة). These shrines are, however, often considered 'orthodox' and therefore this effort does not represent a government effort to empower or assist Sufis in the country.

== See also ==
- Sufism in Pakistan
- Sufism in India
- Sufism in Bangladesh
- Sufism in Afghanistan
