= Sasale =

Village in Maharashtra

- village
- Interactive map of Sasale
- Country: India
- State: Maharashtra
- District: Ratnagiri

Languages
  - Official: Marathi
- Time zone: UTC+5:30 (IST)

Sasale is a village in Rajapur taluka, Ratnagiri District, Maharashtra, India. It has many mango, jackfruit and cashew-nut trees. Sasale is situated near Rajapur Road railway station, located around 5 km away. Its population is 1000. The closest town is Rajapur, located 10 km away.

Ganapati and Shimga are the biggest festivals celebrated in Sasale.
