= Yeshwantgad =

Historical fortification in Maharashtra, India

- Part of Maharashtra
- Ratnagiri district, Maharashtra, India

Site information
- Owner: Government of India

Location
- Yeshwantgad in Maharashtra
- Coordinates: 16.629700°N 73.357252°E

Yeshwantgad also spelt as Yashwantgad is an island fortification off the coast of Maharashtra in Ratnagiri district. It is built on the Rajapur creek with the sea on one side. On three sides it was protected by a ditch which can no longer be seen. On the fourth side there was a wall with 17 bastions. Now the walls are in a ruined condition. Its gate was on the eastern side. A ship (HMS Outram sank here on 1 January 1817 after which a lighthouse at nearby Jaitapur was built. Other than this no notable historical events took place here.
