= Jaitapur =

Jaitapur is a small port situated in Rajapur Tehsil of Ratnagiri district, Maharashtra State, India. Jaitapur lies on the Arabian sea coast

== History ==
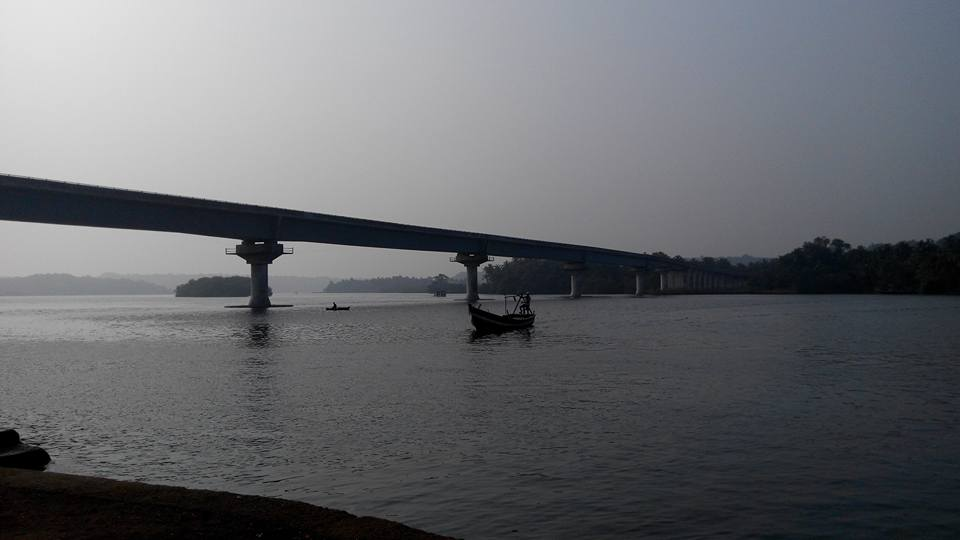

Jaitapur was one of the important ports in ancient and early medieval times.

== Geography ==
Jaitapur is located at 16.59°N 73.35°E. It has an average elevation of 80 metres. Jaitapur is on the Arabian Sea coast in Ratnagiri district in the southwestern part of Maharashtra, India.

== Nuclear Power Project ==
Jaitapur came into limelight due to the proposed Jaitapur Nuclear Power Project by Nuclear Power Corporation of India. The Nuclear Power Plant was approved during Nicolas Sarkozy's trip to India in December 2010 thus giving French multinational Areva the contract to construct 6 reactors, each of 1650 MW capacity totaling to 9,900 MW. The actual plant site is situated at Madban, a village besides Jaitapur. However, the project has been named after Jaitapur, as it is the port for the project.

If commissioned, the 9,900 MW Jaitapur Nuclear Power Station will be the largest in the world, overtaking the current largest 8,200 MW Kashiwazaki-Kariwa Nuclear Power Plant in Japan.

== Opposition of the power plant ==
Jaitapur is considered to be prone to seismic activity. According to a leading Daily it falls under the Zone 3 category. Data collected by the Geological Survey of India has suggested that there have been over 92 quakes in 20 years, the biggest of them being 6.2 on the Richter scale. Keeping this in view and the recent Fukushima I nuclear accidents in Japan, massive protests are being organized by the locals and the tribes in this area who do not trust the Indian Government of providing them with adequate safeguards and preserving the Biodiversity of the region.

On 18 April 2011, one person was killed and at least seven others were injured on Monday when police opened fire on a mob protesting the proposed 9,900 MW Jaitapur Nuclear Power Project. A youth was killed when police attempted to control the protesters who were on a rampage, attacking the Nate police station, a few kilometers from Jaitapur.

On 19 April 2011, in an act of pursuing economic development via nuclear energy colliding with politics, Shiv Sena, a prominent political Party in Maharashtra, declared a bandh (strike) in Ratnagiri, about two hours away from Jaitapur. In the ensuing strike, a hospital was attacked and buses were set on fire. There was no word from the party high command regarding this destruction of public Property.

Greenpeace India has been vehemently supporting the people of Jaitapur against the construction of the Nuclear Power Plant.
