= The Civil Liability for Nuclear Damage Act, 2010 =

Act of the Parliament of India

Civil Liability for Nuclear Damage Act, 2010

Parliament of India
- Long title: An Act to provide for civil liability for Nuclear Damage and prompt compensation to the victims of a Nuclear accident through a No Fault Liability Regime channeling liability to the operator, appointment of Claims Commissioner, establishment of Nuclear Damage Claims commission and for matters connected therewith or incidental thereto.
- Citation: Act No. 38 of 2010
- Enacted by: Parliament of India
- Enacted: 25 August 2010
- Assented to: 21 September 2010
- Commenced: 11 November 2011
- Status: Repealed

The Civil Liability for Nuclear Damage Act, 2010 or Nuclear Liability Act was a highly debated Act which was passed by both houses of the Parliament of India. The Act legislates for civil liability in the event of a nuclear accident. The act was repealed by the Sustainable Harnessing and Advancement of Nuclear Energy for Transforming India Act, 2025 (SHANTI Act).

This was one of the last steps needed to activate the Indo-U.S. civilian nuclear agreement, as the United States nuclear reactor manufacturing companies require the liability bill to get insurance in their home state. The government encountered fierce opposition while trying to push this bill through parliament on several occasions. This was because it contained several controversial clauses that the opposition parties claimed to be 'unconstitutional'. The opposition believed the bill was pushed through due to US pressure though this was later denied by the government.

The Act effectively caps the maximum amount of liability in case of each nuclear accident at ₹15 billion (US$160 million) to be paid by the operator of the nuclear plant, and if the cost of the damages exceeds this amount, special drawing rights up to 300 million will be paid by the Central Government.

The Act made amendments to the Atomic Energy Act 1962 allowing private investment in the Indian nuclear power program. The Act came into force from 11 November 2011.

== Necessity of the Nuclear Liability Act ==
India had an ambitious goal to increase 5-fold the amount of electricity produced from nuclear power plants to 20,000 MWe by 2020. This would be further increased to 27,000 MWe by 2032. In this way, India aims to produce 25 percent of its electricity from nuclear power plants by 2050. India's present production of electricity through nuclear power is 6780 MW. To increase the share of nuclear power, foreign companies would need to be involved in the manufacture and supply of nuclear reactors.

Although there was no international obligation for such a bill, in order to attract the US companies involved in nuclear commerce, such as General Electric and Westinghouse, it was necessary to introduce a liability bill which would help these private companies in getting insurance cover. Thus, the bill helped in the realization of the Indo-U.S. Nuclear deal.

Another motive for the bill was to legally and financially bind the operator and the government to provide relief to the affected population in the case of a nuclear accident. In consideration of the long-term costs related to clean-up and shut-down activities if a nuclear accident were to occur, prominent members of the civil society in India had called on the Government and political parties to hold nuclear suppliers responsible and liable for nuclear accidents.

A major point of debate was the amount of financial assistance to be provided under such circumstances, as some considered it insufficient and unsatisfactory. Additionally, the bill contained certain clauses which would reduce the legal and financial responsibilities of manufacturers and suppliers.

The Atomic Energy Act 1962 empowered the Indian Government to produce, develop, use and dispose of atomic energy either by itself or through any authority or Corporation established by it or a Government company. In this regard, an indigenous sequential three-stage nuclear power programme based on optimum utilization of the country's nuclear resources of modest uranium and abundant thorium is being pursued. Large capacity nuclear power reactors based on foreign cooperation are also being implemented as additionalities, for faster capacity addition.

== Criticism ==
=== Clause 6 ===
Clause 6 defines the share of financial liability. It states that the liability of an operator for each nuclear incident shall be:

(a) for nuclear reactors having power equal to 10 MW or above Rs. 1,500 crores (i.e. Rupees 15 billion)

(b) in respect of spent fuel reprocessing plants, rupees three hundred crores

(c) in respect of the research reactors having thermal power below ten MW, fuel facilities other than spent fuel reprocessing plants and transportation of nuclear materials, Rupees one hundred crores (Rupees 1 billion).

However, the Central government may review the operator's liability from time to time and specify a higher amount. If the total liability stemming from an accident exceeds the maximum amount of liability of an operator, the remaining amount will be paid by the Indian government.

=== Clause 17 ===
This clause deals with the legal binding of the culpable groups in case of a nuclear accident. It allows only the operator (NPCIL) to sue the manufacturers and suppliers. Victims will not be able to sue anyone. In reality, no one will be considered legally liable because the recourse taken by the operator will yield only₹15 billion (US$160 million). RIGHT TO RECOURSE: After paying amounts to the victims operator has the right to recourse to the suppliers. SECTION 17(A):Right to recourse will apply in case it is already mentioned in the contract. SECTION 17(B):Right to recourse in case of a nuclear damage because of the patent or latent defects in the materials or his employee. It also includes defects in sub-standard services. SECTION 17(C):If damage is by a particular act of an individual with an intention to cause damage.

=== Clause 18 ===
Clause 18 of the nuclear liability bill limits the time to make a claim within 10 years. This is considered to be too short as there may be long term damage due to a nuclear accident.

=== Clause 35 ===
Clause 35 extends the legal binding that the responsible groups may have to face. The operator or the responsible persons in case of a nuclear accident will undergo the trial under Nuclear Damage Claims Commissions and no civil court is given the authority. The country will be divided into zones with each zone having a Claims Commissioner. This is in contrast to the US counterpart – the Price Anderson Act, in which lawsuits and criminal proceedings proceed under the US courts.

=== Constitutionality of this Act ===
A public interest litigation (PIL) had also been filed against the Act at the Supreme Court of India in 2011, examining the constitutionality of the Act regarding the Right to Life as enshrined in the Constitution of India.

=== Environmental impact and liability ===
The Bhopal Gas tragedy was another accident where an inherently dangerous substance was leaked and caused havoc. Despite the scale and impact of the tragedy, low liability and compensation resulted, after several delays. Victims were not sufficiently or effectively compensated and rehabilitated. Additionally, the environmental impact of nuclear activity is far reaching. A nuclear accident is disastrous for the environment. A nuclear accident is equally, if not more, harmful. The Act does not properly address liability in the face of an accident or even day to day risks.

== See also ==
- Nuclear power in India
- Indo-U.S. civilian nuclear agreement
