= K. Balagopal =

Indian lawyer and activist (1952 – 2009)

K Balagopal
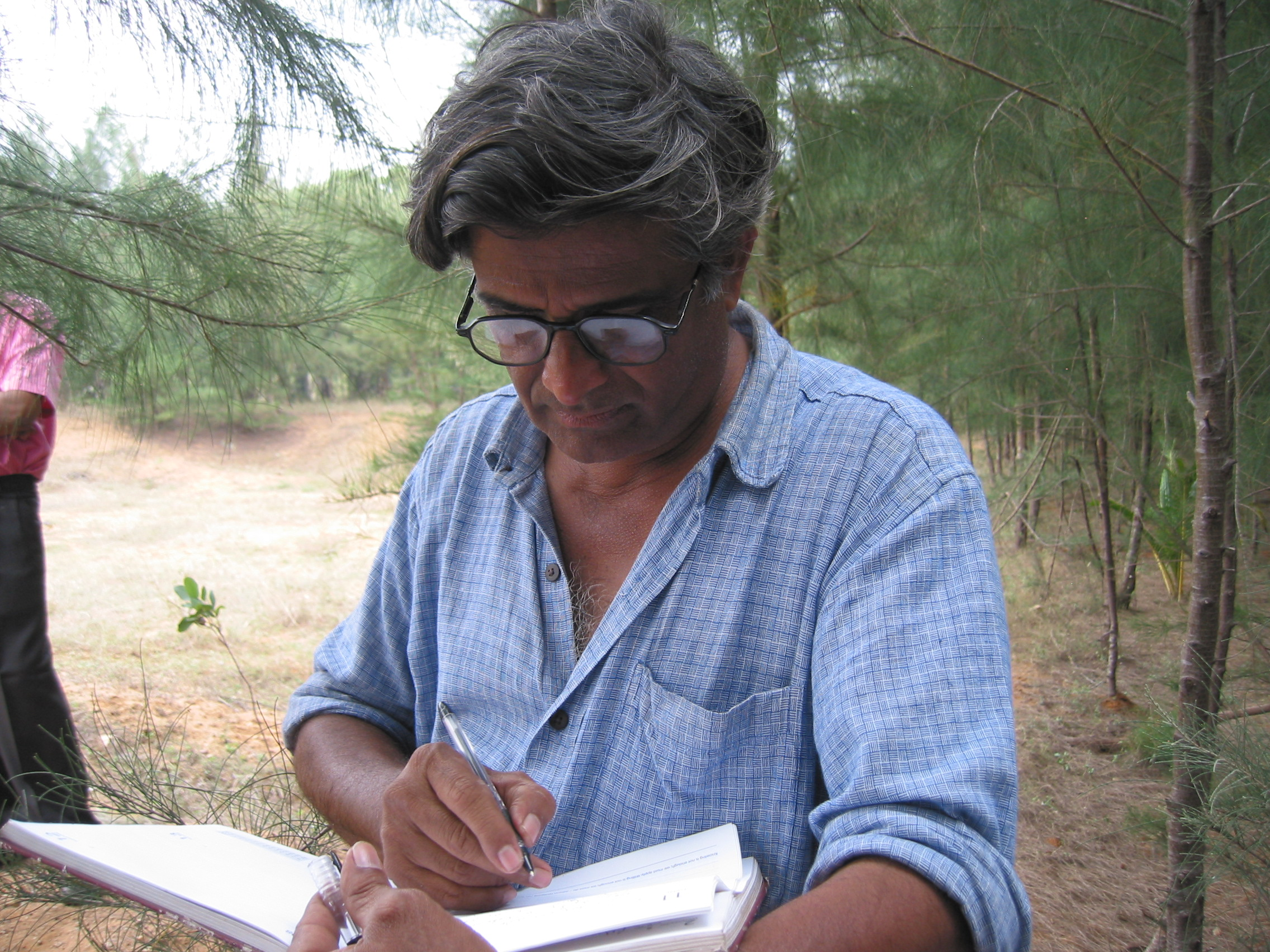
- Born: 10 June 1952; Bellary
- Died: 8 October 2009 (aged 57); Hyderabad
- Movement: Civil Liberties, Human Rights
- Website: balagopal.org

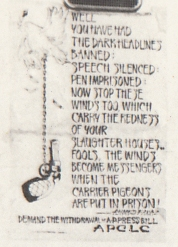
Wall poster of APCLC from 1980s demanding withdrawal of AP Press bill

Kandalla Balagopal (10 June 1952 – 8 October 2009) was a human rights activist, mathematician and lawyer who was known for his work on the issue of civil liberties and human rights. He was a civil liberties activist in Andhra Pradesh. He had broken away from the Andhra Pradesh Civil Liberties Committee (APCLC), with which he was associated since its inception in 1980's, on the issue of violence perpetrated by the erstwhile CPI(ML) People's War. He was a writer on people's issues and had written about the developments on the Maoist front in West Bengal.

== Early life ==
Balagopal was the fifth child of eight children of a middle class Telugu Brahmin couple, Kandalla Parthanatha Sarma and Rallapalli Nagamani. One of his brothers, Anantha, was a doctor in the Indian Army. His father's job in the insurance sector entailed frequent transfers and Balagopal's education was in several towns of AP, from Nellore to Vizianagaram. After Pre-University education in Kavali and BSc in Tirupati, he took an MSc and PhD in mathematics from the Regional Engineering College in Warangal (now NIT Warangal) before proceeding to Delhi for a post-doctoral at the Indian Statistical Institute. He returned to Warangal in 1981, where he started teaching Maths at the Kakatiya University. This was also the time when he decided on social activism and joined the Andhra Pradesh Civil Liberties Committee.

== Career ==
Balagopal was a mathematician, he began his career as a teacher in Warangal but soon turned full-time human rights activist. He was a Mathematics professor at Kakatiya University before quitting in 1985. He did his PhD in Kakatiya University. He chose to become a lawyer much later, after getting fully associated with the human rights movement.

Balagopal served as the general secretary of Andhra Pradesh Civil Liberties Committee (APCLC) between 1983 and 1998. Following differences of opinion within the APCLC on how to respond to revolutionary violence he left APCLC and formed the Human Rights Forum.

Over a period of 26 years, he documented and took up cases of thousands of extrajudicial killings by government forces in Andhra Pradesh and elsewhere. During a series of kidnapping committed by the Maoists in the late 1980s, the vigilante organisation Praja Bandhu (transl. Friends of the People) abducted him and demanded that two police officers be released from naxalite custody. The organisation, which was suspected to have ties with the state police, released him only after the abducted policemen were returned.

First introduced to Marxism through reading D.D. Kosambi, K. Balagopal followed a dialectical Marxist method in scores of articles published in the Economic and Political Weekly until the early 90s. Deeply disturbed by the collapse of the Soviet Union, Balagopal began to explore humanist traditions in Marxism for answers. His articles in the 90s reflect this shift. Many of his major essays were published in the book Ear to the Ground: Selected Writings on Class and Caste (Navayana Books, 2011). One of these, 'Rich Peasant, Poor Peasant', originally published in the journal Seminar (issue no 352, 'Farmer Power', December 1988) was reprinted in the book The Hunger of the Republic: Our Present in Retrospect, part of the series India Since the 90s published by Tulika Books. An article written by him in Andhra Jyothi, a popular Telugu newspaper on 23 February 2002 was translated into English by Anant Maringanti and published by The Wire on 15 April 2016.

=== Human Rights Forum ===
Balagopal founded the Human Rights Forum in Andhra Pradesh on 11 October 1998.

His public criticism of the acts of violence by Maoists attracted severe criticism from the naxalites. Following his comments on the violence in Lalgarh in West Bengal, Maoist Central Committee member, Mallojula Koteshwar Rao had challenged Balagopal to visit Lalgarh resistance area to know the real picture.

He served as a member of the Expert Group on Development Challenges in Extremist Affected Areas, set up by Planning Commission of India in 2008. He believed that human rights are indivisible. He was known for his simple living and his analytical articles that appeared regularly in Economic and Political Weekly. His articles in EPW included issues ranging from the regime of Indira Gandhi, Reservations issue, human rights violations from time to time in different places, the Gujarat riots, Special Economic Zones, land acquisition, sub-categorisation of Scheduled Castes in Andhra Pradesh, the failure of talks between the YSR Government and the CPI-Maoists and so on.

His Telugu essay 'Cheekati Konaalu' directly questioned the violation of human rights by those who claimed that they were working for a radical revolution. After the formation of Human Rights Forum, he expanded his activities and visited areas undergoing intense social turmoil in Jammu and Kashmir, Gujarat, West Bengal and Orissa. In Orissa his fact-finding teams visited Rayagada district and documented the perspective of people displaced by Utkal Allumina Project, Jagatsinghpur district in respect of people affected by proposed Posco steel plant and Kandhamal district, which was affected by communal and ethnic clashes in 2007/2008. He analysed and exposed the hypocrisy in the functioning of most of the mainstream political parties.

Balagopal started practicing law nearly a decade ago and has argued dozens of cases pertaining to encounter killings by the police.

He died in Hyderabad on 8 October 2009.

== Personal life ==
Balagopal was married to Vasanta Lakshmi, a journalist who was working in Andhra Jyothy newspaper. They have a son, Rigobertha Prabhatha.

== Legacy ==
Ramachandra Guha praised Balagopal for his non-partisan commitment to human rights.
