= SHANTI Act, 2025 =

Act of the Parliament of India

Parliament of India
- Long title: An Act to provide for the promotion and development of nuclear energy and ionising radiation for nuclear power generation, application in healthcare, food, water, agriculture, industry, research, environment, innovation in nuclear science and technology, for the welfare of the people of India, and for robust regulatory framework for its safe and secure utilisation and for matters connected therewith or incidental thereto
- Citation: Act No. 39 of 2025
- Territorial extent: India
- Considered by: House of the People
- Passed: 17 December 2025
- Considered by: Council of States
- Passed: 18 December 2025
- Assented to by: Droupadi Murmu (President of India)
- Assented to: 20 December 2025

Initiating chamber: House of the People
- Introduced by: Jitendra Singh
- Introduced: 15 December 2025

Repeals
- Atomic Energy Act, 1962; Civil Liability for Nuclear Damage Act, 2010
- Status: In force

The Sustainable Harnessing and Advancement of Nuclear Energy for Transforming India Act, 2025, commonly known as the SHANTI Act, 2025, is an Act of the Parliament of India governing nuclear energy and ionising radiation. The Act opens up the nuclear industry to private participation, reforms nuclear liablity provisions and regulatory architecture, and allows patents for inventions related to nuclear energy and radiation.

The Act repeals and replaces the Atomic Energy Act, 1962 and the Civil Liability for Nuclear Damage Act, 2010. It was introduced in the Lok Sabha on 15 December 2025 and subsequently passed in both houses of parliament. It received presidential assent on 20 December 2025. From 14 August to 4 September 2026, the Department of Atomic Energy released the draft rules while the Atomic Energy Regulatory Board released the draft regulations of the Act for public consultation.

The Act supports India's Nuclear Energy Mission (NEM), announced in 2025, that has an objective of 100 gigawatt (GWe) of nuclear capacity by 2047. In 2026 the country had a nuclear power capacity of 8.8 GW. The total electricity capacity in 2025 was approximately 450 GW. The NEM supports the government's vision of Viksit Bharat and the goal of net zero carbon emissions by 2070.

== Background ==
The Atomic Energy Act, 1962 was the foundational legislation that provided "for the development, control and use of atomic energy for the welfare of the people of India and for other peaceful purposes." It repealed the Atomic Energy Act of 1948. An amendment to the 1962 Act in 1987 cleared the way for the formation of the Nuclear Power Corporation of India which helped in consolidating the monopoly of the state in the nuclear sector.

The Civil Liability for Nuclear Damage Act, 2010 provided "for civil liability for nuclear damage and prompt compensation to the victims of a nuclear incident through a no-fault liability regime channeling liability to the operator". The 2010 Act, specifically Section (§) 17(b) and §46, were controversial; §17b covered supplier liabilty and a "right to recourse" while §46 allowed claims under other domestic acts in addition to this Act.

== Contents ==
=== Preamble ===
India has developed indigenous capabilities in nuclear energy production and utilization and considers nuclear power an important component of its future energy strategy. India is committed to increasing the share of nuclear energy in the country's energy mix as a clean and dependable source of electricity, particularly important for supporting emerging technologies such as artificial intelligence, quantum computing, and semiconductor manufacturing. India's nuclear programme follows a closed fuel cycle and incorporates radioactive waste management, while its three-stage nuclear power programme seeks to utilize its thorium resources. The wider applications of nuclear science and technology require a new legal framework promoting research and innovation in the private sector. The proposed framework aims to involve both the public and private sectors, and both the domestic industry and global ecosystem. The legislation also seeks to strengthen the legal and regulatory framework to sustain India's record in nuclear and radiation safety.

=== Private participation ===
Section (§) 3 under "Grant of Licence and Safety Authorisation" covers those that are eligible to apply for a licence, namely not only the Government as was the case before according to the Atomic Energy Act of 1962, but also companies and joint ventures. The licence shall cover "building, owning, operating or decommissioning a nuclear power plant or reactor" among other things. This effectively allows private participation throughout the nuclear energy production process. For a foreign company to take advantage of this change, they must first set up a company in India. §2.9 of the Act defines "company" by reference to the Companies Act, 2013. §3 further reserves certain nuclear activities for the Central Government such as enrichment or isotopic separation of prescribed or radioactive substance, unless otherwise notified.

=== Liability ===
§12 states that the operator will not be liable in certain circumstances such as where the nuclear damage caused by a nuclear incident is due to an act of God or violence such as armed conflict or terrorism. §13 covers limits of liability for nuclear incidents. As was the case in the Civil Liability for Nuclear Damage Act 2010, "The maximum amount of liability in respect of each nuclear incident shall be the rupee equivalent of three hundred million Special Drawing Rights or such higher amount as the Central Government may, by notification, specify." §13.2 offers a graded liability regime where the limit of operator's liability (INR) in crore varies from 100 to 3000 according to the category of nuclear installation. §14 covers "Liability of Central Government". It states that in certain cases where the liability amount exceeds that stipulated in the Act, the government may utilize a Nuclear Liability Fund, as established under the Act.

§16 covers an operators "right of recourse" in two cases— where the right has been "provided for in a contract in writing", or "the nuclear incident has occurred as a result of commission or omission of an individual with an intention to cause nuclear damage". This differs from the Civil Liability for Nuclear Damage Act, 2010, which had also allowed a right of recourse in a case of "supply of equipment or material with patent or latent defects or sub-standard services". This means that automatic supplier liability no longer exists. This brings the Act closer to the Convention on Supplementary Compensation for Nuclear Damage (CSC). As a party to CSC India can access international funds for compensation in case of a nuclear incident.

=== Atomic Energy Regulatory Board ===
§17 gives statutory regulatory authority to the Atomic Energy Regulatory Board. (The Board was constituted in 1983 by the President of India "by exercising the power under section 27 of the Atomic Energy Act, 1962". Since the 1980s there were demands to give the board statutory powers.) There is a dispute redressal mechanism if concerned parties are not staisfied with the Boards decision. The Act grants review by the Atomic Energy Redressal Advisory Council. Further §49 states that the Appellate Tribunal for Electricity established under the Electricity Act, 2003, shall be the Appellate Tribunal for the purposes of the Act. Following this §52 stipulates that the Supreme Court comes into the picture. In addition to the Atomic Energy Regulatory Board, another regulatory body, the Central Electricity Regulatory Commission, is involved in the regulatory process of a nuclear project.

=== Electricity tariffs ===
§37 states that "the Central Government shall fix the tariff for supply of electricity from nuclear power plants". This is in contrast to the Electricity Act where the tariffs for electricity are to be decided by the Central and State Electricity Regulatory Commissions.

=== Patents ===
§4 of the Patents Act, 1970 states "Inventions relating to atomic energy not patentable". The SHANTI Act changes this; §38 of the Act reads "The Central Government may grant patents for inventions which in its opinion are for the peaceful uses of nuclear energy and radiation". Now applications in areas such as nuclear medicine and food irradiation can be protected through patents. §38.5 states that an invention must be disclosed to the Central Government before any third party. When read together with §9, the Act attempts to balance "scientific progress with security oversight".

=== Restricted information ===
§39 states that the Central Government may declare certain nuclear domain related information as restricted. This information which is restricted shall continue to be so even when taking Right to Information Act, 2005 into consideration.

=== Compensation ===
Chapter eight (§53 onwards) covers compensation for nuclear damage. The Act provides for the appointment of a Claims Commissioner and Nuclear Damage Claims Commission for adjudicating compensation claims. The Civil Liability for Nuclear Damage Act, 2010 also provided for a similar framework for claims.

== Constitutional challenge ==
EAS Sarma v Union of India is a case which challenges the provisions of the SHANTI Act 2025. The petition, filed in February 2026, challenges the liability framework, the changes to the regulatory architecture, and the need for a deep geological repository among other things. The petitioners include Union Power and Finance Secretary E.A.S. Sarma, former Finance Secretary S.P. Shukla, and Council of Scientific and Industrial Research Chief Scientist Professor Dinesh Abrol. They are being represented by Advocate Prashant Bhushan. The bench includes Chief Justice of India Surya Kant, Justice Joymalya Bagchi and Justice Vipul M Pancholi. The petition challenges sections 11, 12, 13, 14, 16, 17, 19, 39, 44, 67, 81, and 87 of the SHANTI Act under Articles 14, 19, and 21 of the Constitution, as well as the doctrine of absolute liability, polluter pays principle, the doctrine of public trust, principles of inter-generational equity, and the precautionary principle. In February 2026, CJI Kant said that before taking up the matter, "Let us not create a scene that anyone before coming to the country thinks whether or not to". Justice Bagchi said, "Now we are in a global village. The regulatory regimes have to be comparable now."

== See also ==
The dictionary definition of shanti at Wiktionary
