= Ravindra Pinge =

Marathi writer

Ravindra Pinge (13 March 1926 – 17 October 2008) was a Marathi writer.

== Early life ==
Ravindra Pinge's family hailed from Upale-Prindavan area near Kharepatan, in the Konkan region of Maharashtra, India. Though he grew up in Mumbai, his writings depicted his love for Konkan. He retired as an official at All India Radio.

Both his parents were teachers, and he claimed that it created in him a soft corner for the profession of teachers. He had a son named Sambaprasad Pinge and a daughter named Chitra Pinge (Now Chitra Wagh). He was loosely associated with Socialist Party while growing up in Mumbai in 1940s.

Pinge was fond of travelling, and before travel became commonplace in India, he visited, often in the company of his wife Kamal Pinge, places like Shankaracharya's Kaladi in Kerala, the desert of Kachchha near India's western border, area of West Bengal state near India's eastern border next to the then East Pakistan just before the Bangladesh war erupted in 1971, and Assam when Indira Gandhi was assassinated in 1984. He wrote articles detailing his visits.

He was diagnosed with cancer in 2008 and died after a brief illness.

== Authorship ==
Pinge wrote a large number of travelogues and articles introducing contemporary well-known people in different fields and foreign writers to Marathi readers. Collections of many of them were subsequently published in book form. He tried his hand at writing short stories as well.

He had said that Durga Bhagwat and Narayan Ganesh Gore had influenced him.
