= Kovvada Atomic Power Project =

Proposed Indian nuclear power station

Kovvada Atomic Power Project is a proposed 6,600 MW nuclear power station in the state of Andhra Pradesh, India. The project is planned over an area of 2,067 acres. According to GV Ramesh, the project director at NPCIL, close to 485 acres of land has already been handed over for the project by the Srikakulam district administration. The acquisition of the remaining 1,582 acres of land is expected to be completed by October 2017.

== See also ==
- Kovvada, Srikakulam
