= Vatul (village) =

Village in Maharashtra

Coordinates: 16°45′N 73°36′E

Vatul Map

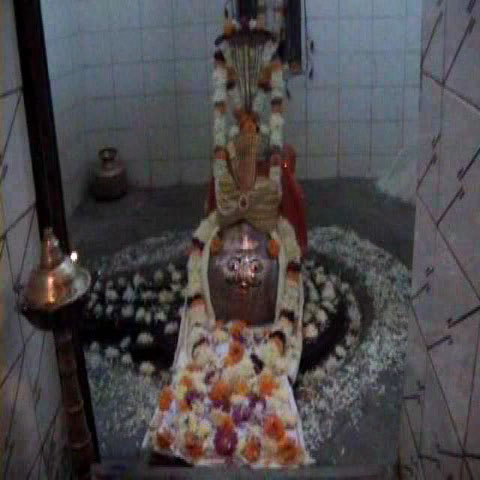
Photo of Swayambhu Mahadeo Mandir at Vatul

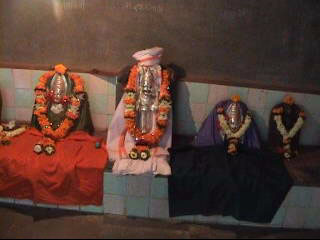
Photo of ADHISTHI & RAVALNATH MANDIR VATUL

Vatul is a village in the State of Maharashtra in India with a population 1349-Male-657-Females-692 (census 2011). 339 houses are in Vatul village. Child population - 124-Male-64-Female-60. Schedule Caste - 91-Male-45-Female-46. Schedule Tribe - 3-Male-2-Female-1. Literacy - 85.39%-Male-94.60%-Female-76.74%. The closest tourism destination to Vatul is Ratnagiri. Other close by tourism destinations include Panhala, Dajipur and Kunkeshwar. The nearest major railway station to Vatul is Ratnagiri (RN) which is at a distance of 23.3 kilometres. The nearest airport is at Goa which is at a distance of 154 kilometres.

== Climate ==
Vatul has distinct seasons, with significant variations in temperature throughout the year. October, March, April and May are the hottest months of the year in Vatul. The temperatures reach their highest in the month of October. November, January, February are the pleasant months of the year, with temperatures reaching their lowest in November. It rains heavily in the month of July, August and September.

== Houses ==
In Vatul, houses are nestled amidst the trees and the paddy fields. There is abundant land available to build upon and yet, the houses lie snugly next to each other. The roofs are built in timber understructure with mangalore tiles. The walls are in brick and verandahs are created with brick arches that offer structural support. The plan of the house is primarily square. The square tiled roof is seen as a common element throughout the Vatul.

== Temples ==
- Swayambhu Mahadeo Mandir
- Adhisthi Devi & Ravalnath Mandir
- Pavana Devi & Jakadevi Mandir
- Vitthal Rukmini tample at kadekar vadi
- Shri Dev Gango Akari Mandir
- Shantidutt BUDHA VIHAR at WALANJU VADI

== Schools and colleges ==
- AADARSH VIDYAMANDIR & Jr.College

== Languages spoken ==
Most of the populace speaks Marathi and Hindi. English is spoken by some, and a few people are fluent in English.

== Cooperative Society ==
Vatul Gram Seva Sangh Sahakari Patpedi Ltd. Estd. 1945 Reg.No.9028 (वाटुळ ग्राम सेवा संघ सहकारी पतपेढी मर्यादीत)
