= IPWR-900 =

Indian nuclear reactor design

- Generation: Generation III+ reactor
- Reactor concept: pressurized water reactor
- Reactor line: IPWR (Indian Pressurized Water Reactor)
- Designed by: Bhabha Atomic Research Centre
- Manufactured by: NPCIL
- Status: Under development

Main parameters of the reactor core
- Fuel (fissile material): ^{235}U (LEU)
- Fuel state: Solid
- Neutron energy spectrum: Thermal
- Primary control method: control rods
- Primary moderator: Light Water
- Primary coolant: Light Water

Reactor usage
- Primary use: Generation of electricity
- Power (thermal): 2700 MWth
- Power (electric): 900 MWe

The Indian Pressurized Water Reactor-900 (IPWR-900) is a class of pressurized water reactors being designed by the Bhabha Atomic Research Centre (BARC) in partnership with the Nuclear Power Corporation of India Limited to supplement the Indian three-stage nuclear power programme.

== History ==
BARC has developed an 83 MW compact light water reactor known as CLWR-B1 for the Indian Navy's Arihant-class submarine program which includes a prototype reactor operating at Kalpakkam since 2002 and was made operational in the INS Arihant in 2013. The experience gained in the naval reactor program is being used to develop a commercial electricity generation reactor of 900 MWe capacity.

To support the industrial capacity to fabricate the large forgings for a reactor pressure vessel, a heavy forge unit has been set up as a joint venture by the Nuclear Power Corporation of India Limited (NPCIL) and Indian engineering conglomerate Larsen & Toubro's subsidiary L&T Special Steels and Heavy Forgings Limited in Hazira, Gujarat. The joint venture has set up a 9000-ton forging press and plans to increase it to 17,000 tons. BARC reported the completion of manufacture of test forgings in August 2021 and confirmed the technological know-how and capability to manufacture forgings of thicknesses 350 mm to 750 mm essential to manufacturing of reactor pressure vessels for pressurized water reactor program.

Indian nuclear activities regulator Atomic Energy Regulatory Board carried out the Pre-Consenting design review for the design in the fiscal year 2015–16.

India is planning to reduce import dependence and to enter the export chain through this effort.

== Design ==
The IPWR design is planned to retain commonality of majority of non-nuclear island components of the design with the IPHWR-700 pressurized heavy-water reactors currently in use to limit design timelines and construction costs. The steam generator design and configuration will also be adopted from the IPHWR-700 design.

The IPWR core consists of 151 fuel assemblies arranged in a hexagonal pitch with 331 lattice locations wherein 311 locations are occupied by fuel pins, 18 by control guide tubes and 1 by instrumentation tube and the remaining location at centre is occupied by central water rod. The fuel pins have an outer diameter 9.4 mm with a wall thickness of 0.7 mm. The core contains 103 rod cluster assemblies with each cluster containing 18 rods which have B_{4}C and Dy_{2}O_{3}·TiO_{2} as the control material. The control rods have been designed to provide negative reactivity coefficients with a shutdown margin of 10 mk at hot zero power state for a prolonged time.

IPWR utilises Gadolinium(Gd) compound Gd_{2}O_{3}(Gadolinia) as a neutron absorber for suppression of initial reactivity which is a prominent feature of modern PWR designs including EPR and AP1000. The use of Gd reduces concentration of dissolved boron required at the beginning of the fuel cycle and helps keep the coolant temperature coefficient of reactivity sufficiently negative in all operating conditions.

The reactor will utilise a reactor pressure vessel made of 20MnMoNi55 steel also known as “APURVA” (Advanced Purified Reactor Vessel Alloy). BARC disclosed in January 2020 that a Core catcher design has been validated that can manage a 100% core melt accident.

The design will include Generation III+ safety features like Passive Decay Heat Removal System, Emergency Core Cooling System (ECCS), Corium Retention and Core Catcher System.

== Reactor fleet ==
The Government of India or NPCIL have not disclosed any locations or timeline for the construction of the first IPWR-900 reactor.

== Technical specifications ==
Specifications	IPWR-900
Thermal output, MW	2700
Electrical output, MW	900
Efficiency, net %	33.33%
Vapor pressure, in 100 kPa	
in front of the turbine	-
in the first circuit	-
Water temperature, °C:	
core coolant inlet	307.5
core coolant outlet	320
Equivalent core diameter, m	—
Active core height, mm	3600
Outer diameter of fuel rods, mm	13.16
Number of fuel rods in assembly	311
Number of fuel assemblies	151
Uranium loading, tons	-
Average uranium enrichment, %	4.22
Average fuel burnup, MW · day / kg	30
Maximum fuel burnup, MW · day / kg	50
Average linear heat generation rate in a pin (W/cm)	159.6
Power density (MW/m^{3} or KW/litre)	87.4
System pressure (MPa)	15.7
Cycle length (FPDs)	410
Burnable neutron absorber material in fuel (IFBA)	Gd_{2}O_{3}(Gadolinia)
Reactivity control	Soluble boron (H_{3}BO_{3} in water)
Control rod material	B_{4}C and Dy_{2}O_{3}·TiO_{2}

== See also ==
- IPHWR, a class of Indian PHWRs.
- AHWR-300, thorium fuelled PHWR design for the Indian Three stage nuclear power programme
- India's three-stage nuclear power programme
- Nuclear power in India
- VVER, similar reactor of Russian origin
- AP1000, similar reactor of US origin
- EPR, similar reactor of European origin
- Hualong One, similar reactor of Chinese origin
- APR-1400, similar reactor of South Korean origin
