= IPHWR =

Indian nuclear reactor design

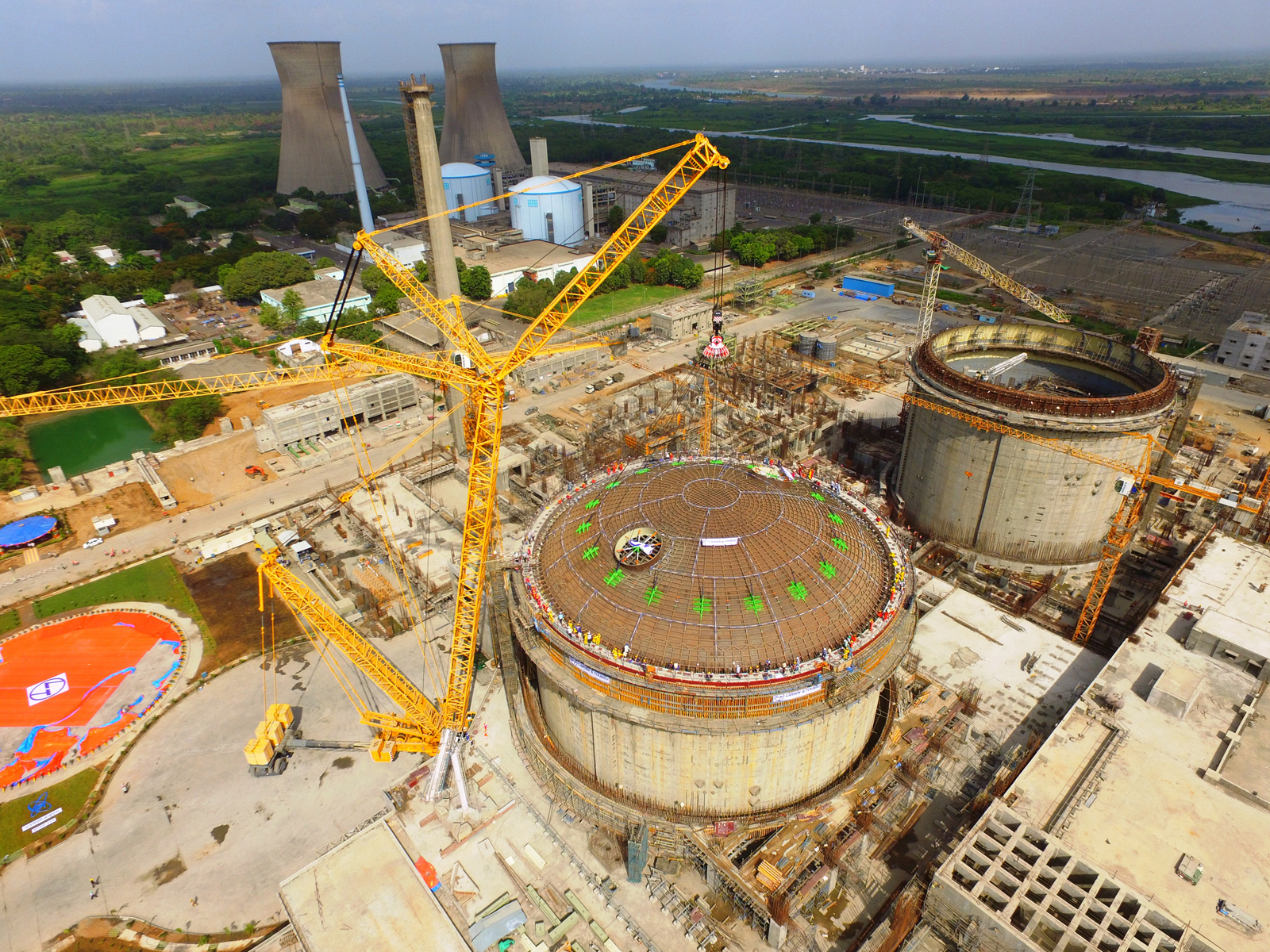
Kakrapar Atomic Power Station with two IPHWR-700 units under construction in the Indian state of Gujarat

The IPHWR (Indian Pressurized Heavy Water Reactor) is a class of Indian pressurized heavy-water reactors designed by the Bhabha Atomic Research Centre. The baseline 220 MWe design was developed from the CANDU based RAPS-1 and RAPS-2 reactors built at Rawatbhata, Rajasthan. Later the design was indigenised and scaled to 540 MWe and 700 MWe. Currently there are 19 units of various types operational at various locations in India (14 IPHWR-220, 2 IPHWR - 540 and 3 IPHWR-700) and 13 more IPHWR-700 reactors planned or under construction.

== Design ==
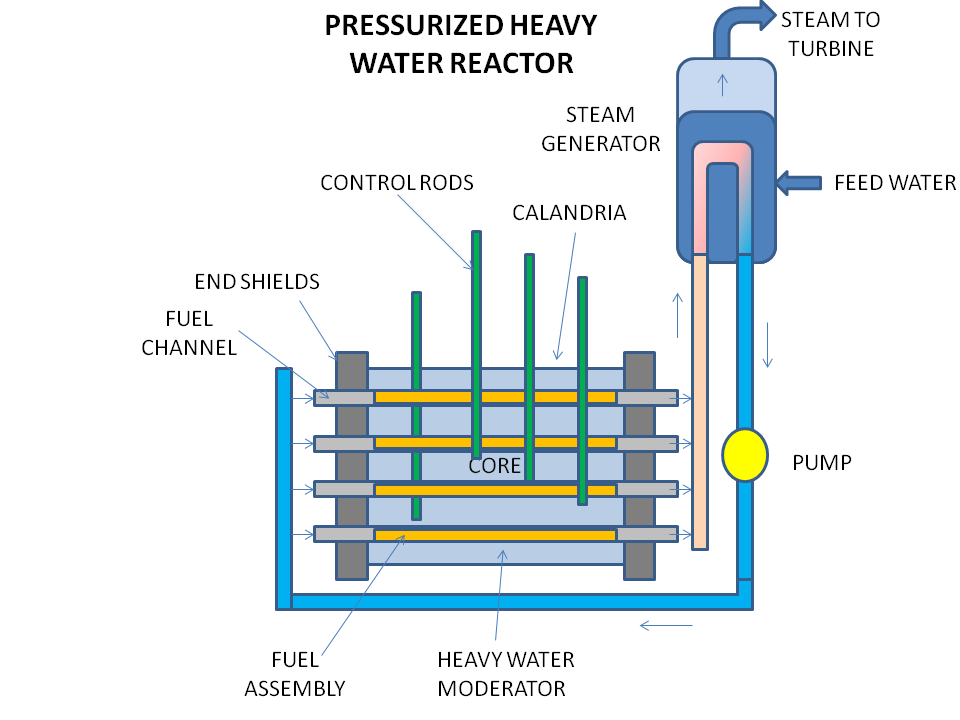
Primary circuit diagram of Pressurized Heavy Water Reactor

The IPHWR reactor is a horizontal pressure tube type. It is derived from the CANDU reactor. These tubes are housed in a horizontal vessel called Calandria. It is filled with heavy water moderator. The each independent tubes are in tubes with circulating carbon dioxide gas. The tubes contain 12 fuel assemblies each and circulating pressurized heavy water coolant. This coolant collects heat from the fuel (natural uranium dioxide) and transfers it to the secondary coolant water to generate steam in the steam generators. This steam turns the turbine coupled to a AC synchronous generator producing 11kV or 20kV 50 Hz AC current. This steam is then condensed, reheated, deaerated and pumped back to the reactor. The moderator heavy water is kept circulating and is maintained at around 70 degrees Celsius. The fission chain reaction is controlled using control rods of cadmium or boron. There is a scram system to inject a poison called gadolinium nitrate in the moderator. The reactors can be refuelled while on full power giving additional advantages. The reactor has a efficiency of around 29 to 30 % gross. These reactors are highly safe. They have many innovative safety systems. They form the first stage of India's three stage nuclear power program.

== IPHWR-220 ==
The first PHWR units built in India (RAPS-1 and RAPS-2) are of Canadian CANDU design similar to the first full-scale Canadian reactor built at Douglas point, Ontario. The reactors were set up in collaboration with Government of Canada. Starting in 1963, 100 MWe RAPS-1 was mostly built with equipment and technology supplied by AECL, Canada. RAPS-1 was commissioned in 1973 but the cessation of Canadian cooperation in light of successful development of nuclear weapons by India as part of Operation Smiling Buddha the RAPS-2 commissioning could only be completed by 1981. Later on higher capacity derivatives were developed by Bhabha Atomic Research Centre in partnership with Indian manufacturers Larsen & Toubro and Bharat Heavy Electricals Limited. Successively, a totally Indian design of 220 MWe power capacity was designed and two units were built at Kalpakkam in Tamil Nadu state christened MAPS-1 and MAPS-2. MAPS-1&2 design was evolved from RAPS-1&2, with modifications carried out to suit the coastal location and also introduction of suppression pool to limit containment peak pressure under loss of coolant accident (LOCA) in lieu of dousing tanks in RAPS-1&2. In addition, MAPS-1&2 have partial double containment. This design was further improved and all subsequent PHWR units in India have double containment.

With experience of design and operation of earlier units and indigenous R&D efforts, major modifications were introduced in NAPS-1&2. These units are the basis of standardized Indian PHWR units later designated as IPHWR-220.

The design of subsequent units i.e. KGS-1, KGS-2, RAPS-3, RAPS-4, RAPS-5, RAPS-6, KGS-3 and KGS-4 is of standard Indian PHWR design. The major improvements in these designs include valve-less primary heat transport system and a unitized control room concept. In addition, the design of these units included improvements in Control and Instrumentation system and incorporation of computer based systems to match with the advancement in technology.

== IPHWR-540 ==
Upon completion of the design of IPHWR-220, a larger 540 MWe design was started c. 1984 under the aegis of the Bhabha Atomic Research Centre (BARC) in partnership with the Nuclear Power Corporation of India Limited (NPCIL). Two reactors of this design were built in Tarapur, Maharashtra starting in the year 2000 and the first was commissioned on 12 September 2005. Only two such reactors i.e. Tarapur-3 & Tarapur-4 were built. The design was later upgraded to a 700 MWe design.

== IPHWR-700 ==
The IPHWR-540 design was later upgraded to 700 MWe with the main objective to improve fuel efficiency and develop a standardized design to be installed at many locations across India as a fleet-mode effort. The design was also upgraded to incorporate Generation III+ features.

The 700 MWe PHWR design includes some features, which are introduced for the first time in Indian PHWRs which include partial boiling at the coolant channel outlet, interleaving of primary heat transport system feeders, passive decay heat removal system, regional over power protection, containment spray system, mobile fuel transfer machine, and a steel liner on the inner containment wall.

By 2031–2032, NPCIL plans to construct 18 more nuclear power reactors, which together have the potential to produce 13,800 MWe of electricity. This will bring the total amount of atomic power in the energy mix to 22,480 MWe.

== Reactor fleet ==
IPHWR Reactors
Location	Type	Online	Status	Net capacity (MWe)	Gross capacity (MWe)	Note
Narora-1	IPHWR-220	1991	Operational	202	220	
Narora-2	IPHWR-220	1992	Operational	202	220	
Kakrapar-1	IPHWR-220	1993	Operational	202	220	
Kakrapar-2	IPHWR-220	1995	Operational	202	220	
Kaiga-1	IPHWR-220	2000	Operational	202	220	
Kaiga-2	IPHWR-220	2000	Operational	202	220	
Kaiga-3	IPHWR-220	2007	Operational	202	220	
Kaiga-4	IPHWR-220	2011	Operational	202	220	
Madras-1	IPHWR-220	1984	Operation suspended (under maintenance)	202	220	
Madras-2	IPHWR-220	1986	Operational	202	220	
Rajastan-3	IPHWR-220	2000	Operational	202	220	
Rajastan-4	IPHWR-220	2000	Operational	202	220	
Rajastan-5	IPHWR-220	2010	Operational	202	220	
Rajastan-6	IPHWR-220	2010	Operational	202	220	
Tarapur-3	IPHWR-540	2006	Operational	490	540	
Tarapur-4	IPHWR-540	2005	Operational	490	540	
Kakrapar-3	IPHWR-700	2023	Operational	630	700	
Kakrapar-4	IPHWR-700	2024	Operational	630	700	
Kaiga-5	IPHWR-700		Under construction	630	700	
Kaiga-6	IPHWR-700		Under construction	630	700	
Gorakhpur-1	IPHWR-700		Under construction	630	700	
Gorakhpur-2	IPHWR-700		Under construction	630	700	
Gorakhpur-3	IPHWR-700		Planned	630	700	
Gorakhpur-4	IPHWR-700		Planned	630	700	
Rajastan-7	IPHWR-700	2025	Operational	630	700	
Rajastan-8	IPHWR-700		Under construction	630	700	
Mahi Banswara-1	IPHWR-700		Planned	630	700	
Mahi Banswara-2	IPHWR-700		Planned	630	700	
Mahi Banswara-3	IPHWR-700		Planned	630	700	
Mahi Banswara-4	IPHWR-700		Planned	630	700	

== Technical specifications ==
Technical specifications of IPHWR
Parameters	IPHWR-220	IPHWR-540	IPHWR-700
Reference			
Thermal output, MWth	754.5	1730	2166/2177
Active power, MWe	220	540	700
Efficiency, net %	27.8	28.08	29.08
Coolant temperature, °C:			
core coolant inlet	249	266	266
core coolant outlet	293.4	310	310
Primary coolant material	Heavy Water		
Secondary coolant material	Light Water		
Moderator material	Heavy Water		
Reactor operating pressure, kg/cm^{2} (g)	87	100	100
Active core height, cm	508.5	594	594
Equivalent core diameter, cm	451	-	638.4
Average fuel power density	9.24 KW/KgU	-	235 MW/m^{3}
Average core power density, MW/m^{3}	10.13	-	12.1
Fuel	Sintered Natural UO_{2} pellets		
Cladding tube material	Zircaloy-2	Zircaloy-4	
Fuel assemblies	3672	5096	4704 fuel bundles in 392 channels
Number of fuel rods in assembly	19 elements in 3 rings	37	37 elements in 4 rings
Enrichment of reload fuel	0.7% U-235		
Fuel cycle length, Months	24	12	12
Average fuel burnup, MW · day / ton	6700	7500	7050
Control rods	SS/Co	Cadmium/SS	
Neutron absorber	Boric Anhydride	Boron	
Active residual heat removal system	Shutdown cooling system		
Passive residual heat removal system	Natural circulation through steam generators		
Passive residual heat removal system	-	Passive Decay heat removal system	
Safety injection system	Emergency core cooling system		

== Further development ==
NPCIL is developing the Bharat Small Modular Reactor (BSMR) and has asked for orders from private companies for construction of BSR at their manufacturing sites to which till now six companies have responded. It is a 220MWe compact PHWR Small modular reactor derived from the larger IPHWR-220.

== See also ==
- IPHWR-220, first version of the IPHWR class of reactors
- IPHWR-700, Generation III+ successor to the IPHWR-220 design
- CANDU, predecessor to Indian PHWR designs
- AHWR-300, thorium fuelled PHWR design for the Indian Three stage nuclear power programme
- India's three-stage nuclear power programme
- Nuclear power in India
