= IPHWR-700 =

Indian nuclear reactor design

IPHWR-700 Reactor Class
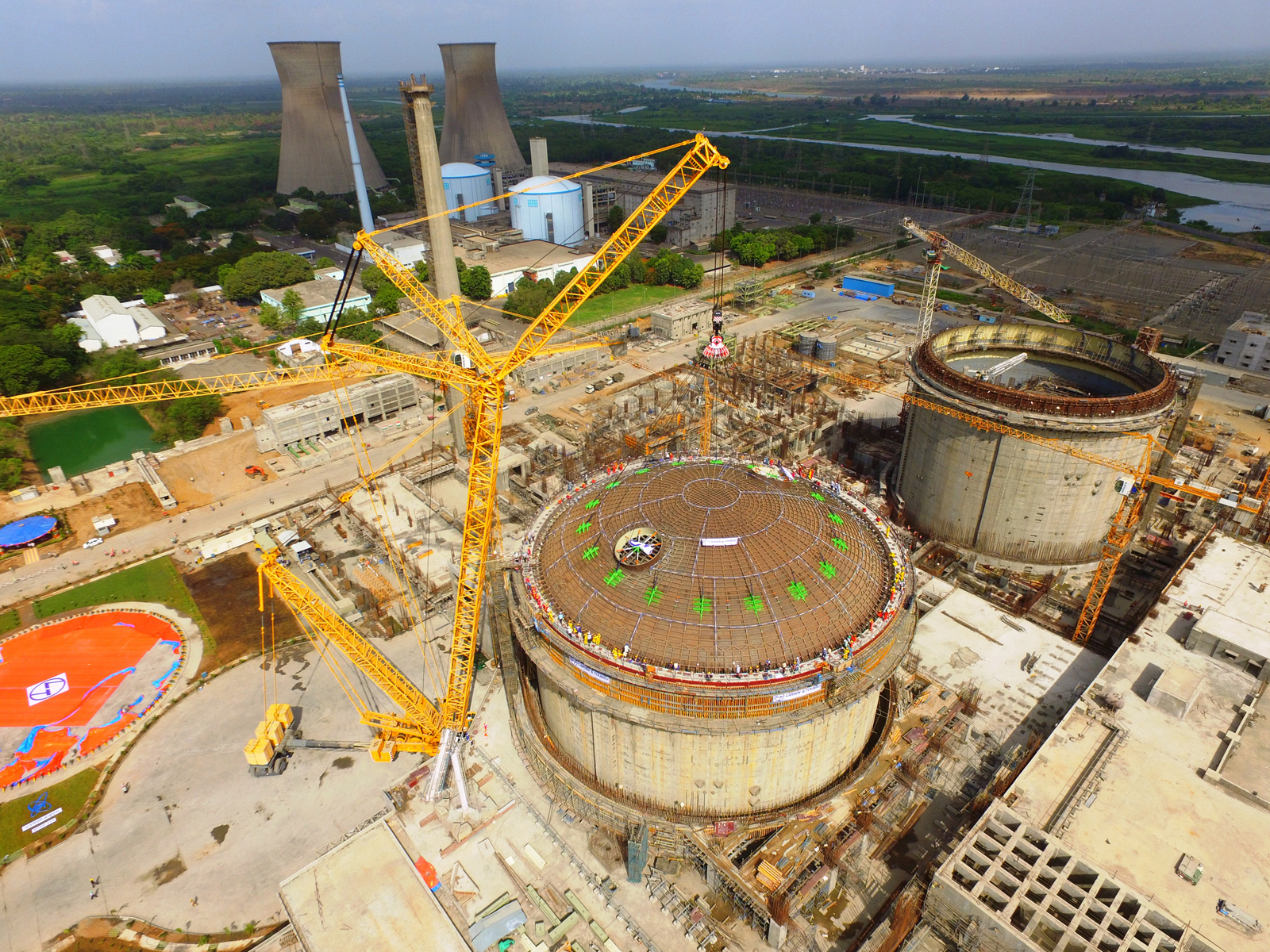
- Kakrapar Atomic Power Station reactor units 3 and 4, under construction in the Indian state of Gujarat
- Generation: Generation III+ reactor
- Reactor concept: pressurized heavy-water reactor
- Reactor line: IPHWR (Indian Pressurized Heavy-water Reactor)
- Designed by: NPCIL
- Manufactured by: NPCIL
- Status: 3 operational; 5 under construction; 12 planned

Main parameters of the reactor core
- Fuel (fissile material): ^{235}U (NU/SEU/LEU)
- Fuel state: Solid
- Neutron energy spectrum: Thermal
- Primary control method: Control rods
- Primary moderator: Heavy water
- Primary coolant: Heavy water

Reactor usage
- Primary use: Generation of electricity
- Power (thermal): 2166 MWth
- Power (electric): 700 MWe

The IPHWR-700 (Indian Pressurized Heavy Water Reactor-700) is an Indian pressurized heavy-water reactor designed by the Nuclear Power Corporation of India (NPCIL). It is a Generation III+ reactor developed from earlier CANDU based 220 MW and 540 MW designs. It can generate 700 MW of electricity. Currently there are 3 units operational, 3 unit under construction and 12 more units planned, at a combined cost of ₹1.05 lakh crore (US$11 billion).

== Development ==
PHWR technology was introduced in India in the late 1960s with the construction of RAPS-1, a CANDU reactor in Rajasthan. All the main components for the first unit were supplied by Canada. India did the construction, installation and commissioning. In 1974, after India conducted Smiling Buddha, its first nuclear weapons test, Canada stopped their support of the project. This delayed the commissioning of RAPS-2 until 1981.

After Canada withdrew from the project, research, design and development work in the Bhabha Atomic Research Centre and Nuclear Power Corporation of India (NPCIL) enabled India to proceed without assistance. Some industry partners did manufacturing and construction work. Over four decades, fifteen 220-MW reactors of indigenous design were built. New safety systems were incorporated. Reliability was enhanced, bringing better capacity factors and lower costs.

To get economies of scale, NPCIL developed a 540 MW design. Two of these were constructed at the Tarapur Atomic Power Station.

After a redesign to utilise excess thermal margins, the 540 MW PHWR design achieved a 700 MW capacity without many design changes. Almost 100% of the parts of these indigenously designed reactors are manufactured by Indian industry.

== Design ==
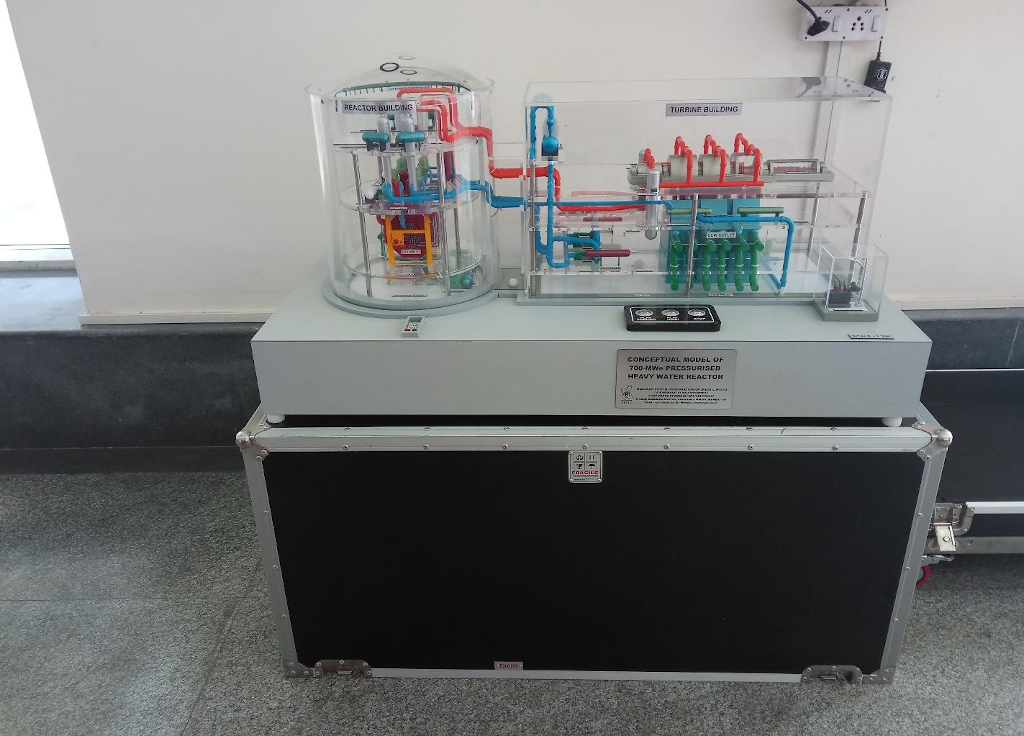
I-PHWR700 Model installed in GCNEP Office, Haryana

Like other pressurized heavy-water reactors, IPHWR-700 uses heavy water (deuterium oxide, D_{2}O) as its coolant and neutron moderator. The design retains the features of other standardized Indian PHWR units, which include:

- Two diverse and fast acting shutdown systems
- Double containment of reactor building
- A water filled calandria vault
- An integral calandria – end shield assembly
- Zr-2.5% Nb pressure tubes separated from respective calandria tubes
- A calandria tube filled with carbon dioxide (which is recirculated) to monitor pressure tube leak

It also has some new features as well, including:

- Partial boiling at the coolant channel outlet
- Interleaving of primary heat transport system feeders
- A system to remove passive decay heat
- Regional protection from over power
- A containment spray system
- A mobile fuel transfer machine
- A steel lined containment wall

The reactor has less excess reactivity. Therefore, it does not need neutron poison inside the fuel or moderator. These designs handle the case of a loss of coolant accident such as occurred in the Fukushima Daiichi nuclear disaster.

== Operation ==
The reactor fuel uses natural uranium fuel with Zircaloy-4 cladding. The core produces 2166 MW of heat which is converted into 700 MW of electricity at a thermal efficiency of 32%. Because there is less excess reactivity inside the reactor, it needs to be refuelled continually during operation. The reactor is designed for an estimated life of 40 years.

Unit 3 of Kakrapar Atomic Power Station was connected to the grid on 10 January 2021.

== Reactor fleet ==
IPHWR-700 Reactor fleet
Power station	Location	Operator	Units	Total capacity	Status	Operation start
In Operation
KAPS-3	Kakrapar, Gujarat	NPCIL	700 x 2	1400	Operational	2021
KAPS-4	Kakrapar, Gujarat	NPCIL	700 x 2	1400	Operational	2024
RAPS-7	Rawatbhata, Rajasthan	NPCIL	700 x 1	700	Operational	2025
Under Construction
RAPS-8	Rawatbhata, Rajasthan	NPCIL	700 x 1	700	Under construction	2026
GHAVP-1	Gorakhpur, Haryana	NPCIL	700 x 2	1400	Under construction	2028
GHAVP-2	Gorakhpur, Haryana	NPCIL	700 x 2	1400	Under construction	2029
KGS-5	Kaiga, Karnataka	NPCIL	700 x 2	1400	Under construction	2030
KGS-6	Kaiga, Karnataka	NPCIL	700 x 2	1400	Under construction	2031
Mahi Banswara 1	Banswara, Rajasthan	ASHVINI JV - Anushakti Vidhyut Nigam	700 x 4	2800	Planned	~2032
Mahi Banswara 2	Banswara, Rajasthan	ASHVINI JV - Anushakti Vidhyut Nigam	700 x 4	2800	Planned	~2032
Mahi Banswara 3	Banswara, Rajasthan	ASHVINI JV - Anushakti Vidhyut Nigam	700 x 4	2800	Planned	~2032
Mahi Banswara 4	Banswara, Rajasthan	ASHVINI JV - Anushakti Vidhyut Nigam	700 x 4	2800	Planned	~2032
Chutka 1	Chutka, Madhya Pradesh	NPCIL	700 x 2	1400	Planned	~2032
Chutka 2	Chutka, Madhya Pradesh	NPCIL	700 x 2	1400	Planned	~2032
GHAVP-3	Gorakhpur, Haryana	NPCIL	700 x 2	1400	Planned	~2032
GHAVP-4	Gorakhpur, Haryana	NPCIL	700 x 2	1400	Planned	~2032
Rajastan 9	Rawatbhata, Rajasthan	NPCIL	700 x 2	1400	Planned	
Rajastan 10	Rawatbhata, Rajasthan	NPCIL	700 x 2	1400	Planned	
Kakrapar 5	Kakrapar, Gujarat	NPCIL	700 x 2	1400	Planned	
Kakrapar 6	Kakrapar, Gujarat	NPCIL	700 x 2	1400	Planned	
Narora 3	Narora, Uttar Pradesh	NPCIL	700 x 2	1400	Planned	
Narora 4	Narora, Uttar Pradesh	NPCIL	700 x 2	1400	Planned	

== Technical specifications ==
Specifications	IPHWR-220	IPHWR-540	IPHWR-700
Thermal output, MWth	754.5	1730	2166
Active power, MWe	220	540	700
Efficiency, net %	27.8	28.08	29.00
Coolant temperature, °C:			
core coolant inlet	249	266	266
core coolant outlet	293.4	310	310
Primary coolant material	Heavy Water		
Secondary coolant material	Light Water		
Moderator material	Heavy Water		
Reactor operating pressure, kg/cm^{2} (g)	87	100	100
Active core height, cm	508.5	594	594
Equivalent core diameter, cm	451	–	638.4
Average fuel power density	9.24 KW/KgU	–	235 MW/m^{3}
Average core power density, MW/m^{3}	10.13	–	12.1
Fuel	Sintered Natural UO_{2} pellets		
Cladding tube material	Zircaloy-2	Zircaloy-4	
Fuel assemblies	3672	5096	4704 fuel bundles in 392 channels
Number of fuel rods in assembly	19 elements in 3 rings	37	37 elements in 4 rings
Enrichment of reload fuel	0.7% U-235		
Fuel cycle length, Months	24	12	12
Average fuel burnup, MW · day / ton	6700	7500	7050
Control rods	SS/Co	Cadmium/SS	
Neutron absorber	Boric Anhydride	Boron	
Residual heat removal system	Active: Shutdown cooling system Passive: Natural circulation through steam generators	Active: Shutdown cooling system Passive: Natural circulation through steam generators and Passive Decay heat removal system	
Safety injection system	Emergency core cooling system		

== See also ==
- IPHWR, a class of Indian PHWRs.
- IPHWR-220, earlier lower power variant of IPHWR-700
- CANDU, predecessor to Indian PHWR designs
- AHWR-300, thorium fuelled PHWR design for the Indian Three stage nuclear power programme
- India's three-stage nuclear power programme
- Nuclear power in India
