= Gorakhpur (disambiguation) =

Gorakhpur is a city in Uttar Pradesh, India.

Gorakhpur may also refer to:

- Administrative units centred on the city:
  - Gorakhpur district
  - Gorakhpur division
  - Gorakhpur (Lok Sabha Constituency)
- Gorakhpur, Palghar, a village in Maharashtra, India
- Gorakhpur, Haryana, a village in Fatehabad district of Haryana
