= Gorakhpur Nuclear Power Plant =

Nuclear power station in Haryana, India

- Location of Gorakhpur Nuclear Power Plant in Haryana
- Official name: Gorakhpur Haryana Anu Vidyut Pariyojana
- Country: India
- Location: Gorakhpur village, Fatehabad district, Haryana
- Coordinates: 29°26′29″N 75°37′56″E
- Status: Under Construction
- Construction began: Unit 1 & 2: 2022
- Commission date: Unit 1 & 2: 2028 and 2029 respectively(planned)
- Construction cost: ₹20,594 crore (equivalent to ₹330 billion or US$3.42 billion in 2023)
- Owner: NPCIL
- Operator: NPCIL

Nuclear power station
- Reactor type: IPHWR-700
- Reactor supplier: NPCIL/BARC
- Cooling source: Bhakra Main Line Canal (via Nangal hydel Channel from Bhakra Nangal Dam)

Power generation
- Units planned: 2 x 700 MW
- Units under const.: 2 x 700 MW

External links
- Commons: Related media on Commons

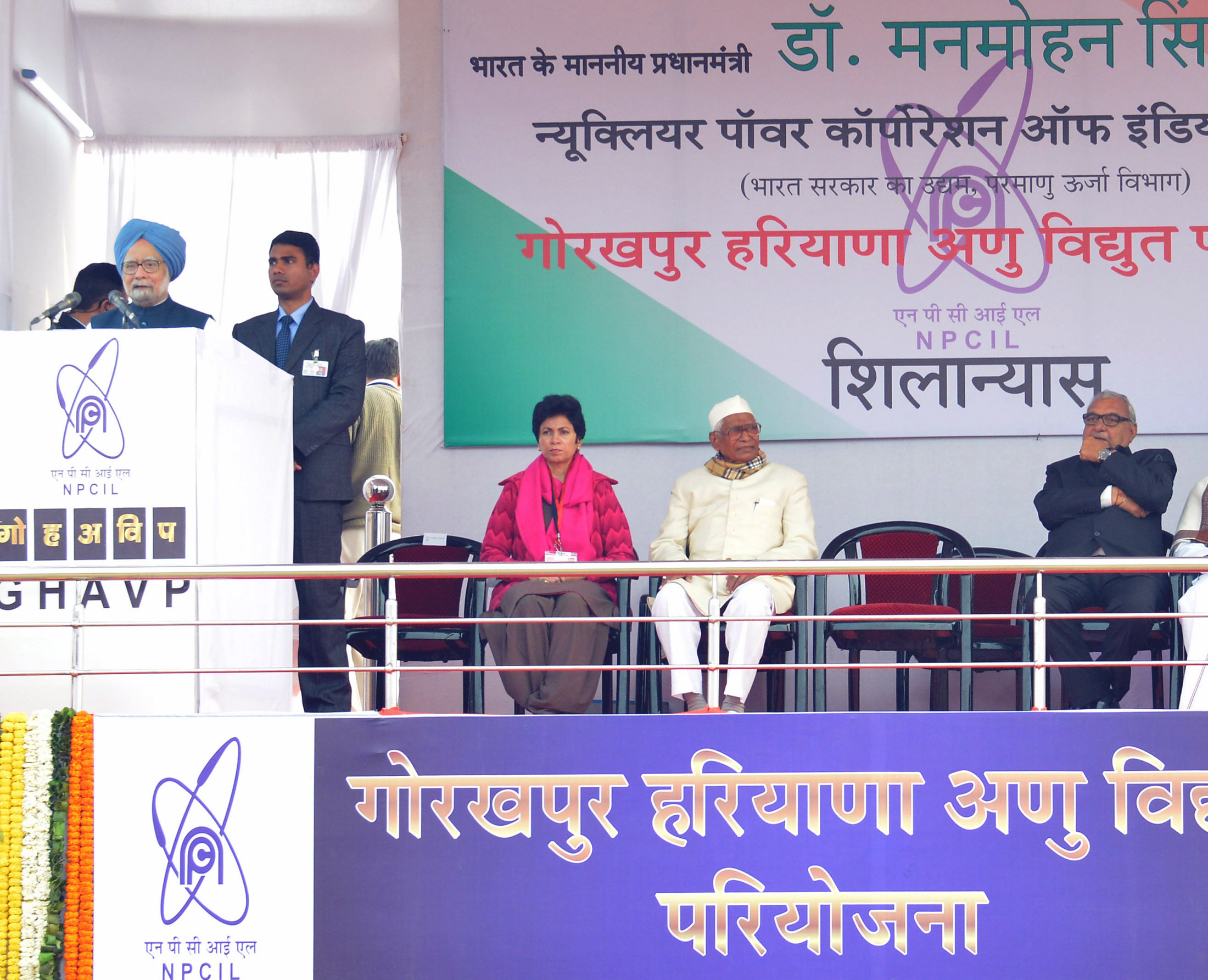
The Prime Minister, Dr. Manmohan Singh addressing at the foundation stone laying ceremony of the Gorakhpur Haryana Anu Vidyut Pariyojana (Nuclear Power Project), in Fatehabad, Haryana on January 13, 2014. The Governor of Haryana, Shri Jagannath Pahadia, the Chief Minister of Haryana, Shri Bhupinder Singh Hooda and the Union Minister for Social Justice & Empowerment, Kumari Selja are also seen.

The Gorakhpur Nuclear Power Plant or the Gorakhpur Haryana Anu Vidyut Pariyojana (GHAVP) is a nuclear power plant under construction on a 560 hectares (1,400 acres) area west of Gorakhpur village of Fatehabad district of Haryana.

The foundation stone of the 2800 megawatt nuclear power plant was laid on 13 January 2014, however actual construction began in 2022. The first phase of the project will have an installed capacity of 1400 MW and was expected to be completed by 2025, however the deadline has been now extended to 2029. The construction of second phase will gather pace afterwards, which will double the capacity to 2800 MW and has a deadline of 2036.

== History ==
One year after laying the foundation stone, there was no reactor construction activity. NPCIL carried out only certain pre-project activities on the land. There were problems with the Environment Court at Kurukshetra and over the possession of 28 acres, as owners of the land refused to accept compensation and to vacate the land. Officials said that the government was suffering a financial loss of Rs 7 to 8 crore per day for the delay of the project.

On May 27, 2015, a police force evicted farmers living on a piece of land acquired by the NPCIL. Houses were razed, crops destroyed, and the farmers belongings and cattle carted away. In 2012, NPCIL acquired over 1,503 acres (608 ha) of land in Gorakhpur, Kajal Heri and Badopal for the setting up of nuclear power plant. The corporation had taken possession of the major part of land, but farmers owning 28 acres had refused the compensation and were not vacating the land.

In March 2016, still only preparatory activities were made. By 2018, NPCIL had started the procurement activities for this project, as BHEL secured the order for supply of steam generators to this project.

As of April 2022, the foundation piles have been completed for units 1 and 2 (but not nuclear island concrete pour), while the excavation work for other structures such as cooling towers are in progress. Only pre-project activities had been carried out for units 3 and 4.

== Design and specification ==
The proposed 700 MW IPHWR-700 pressurized heavy water reactors are indigenous and similar to the ones currently under construction in Kakrapar Atomic Power Station (KAPP-3 &4) and Rajasthan Atomic Power Station (RAPP-7 & 8). Also, the reactor size and the design features of 700 MW are similar to that of 540 MWe of Tarapur Atomic Power Station 3 & 4 Units, except that partial boiling of the coolant is up to about 3% (nominal) at the coolant channel exit has been allowed.

== Cost and economics ==
Being built by the Nuclear Power Corporation of India, the project is estimated to cost ₹20,594 crore (equivalent to ₹330 billion or US$3.42 billion in 2023) as of January 2014.

== Units ==
Phase	Unit No.	Reactor		Status	Capacity in MWe		Construction start	First criticality	Grid Connection	Commercial operation	Closure	Notes
Phase	Unit No.	Type	Model	Status	Net	Gross	Construction start	First criticality	Grid Connection	Commercial operation	Closure	Notes
I	1	PHWR	IPHWR-700	Under construction	630	700	2022	—N/a	—N/a	2028 (planned)	—N/a	
I	2	PHWR	IPHWR-700	Under construction	630	700	2022	—N/a	—N/a	2029 (planned)	—N/a	
II	3	PHWR	IPHWR-700	Planned	630	700		—N/a	—N/a	—N/a	—N/a	
II	4	PHWR	IPHWR-700	Planned	630	700		—N/a	—N/a	—N/a	—N/a	

== Updates ==
- (Mar 2021) First end-shield for pressurized heavy water reactor delivered.
- (July 2021) Godrej & Boyce gets ₹468 Cr order to supply generators for PHWR project
- (July 2021) BHEL awarded steam generator contract for domestic PHWRs
- (Aug 2021) L&T delivers second end-shield for pressurized heavy water reactor
- (Sep 2021) BHEL wins order for turbine islands
- (July 2025) L&T delivers steam generator for reactor ahead of schedule.

== See also ==
- Nuclear power in India
