= India's three-stage nuclear power programme =

India's nuclear energy programme envisioned by Homi J. Bhabha

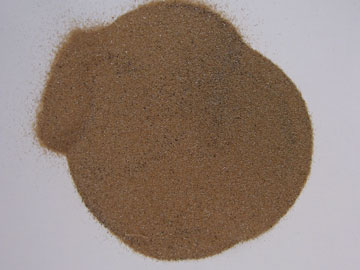
Monazite powder, a rare earth and thorium phosphate mineral, is the primary source of the world's thorium

India's three-stage nuclear power programme is an Indian nuclear program focused on enabling the utilisation of India's thorium reserves in meeting the country's energy requirements through the use of nuclear power. It was planned by physicist Homi J. Bhabha in the 1950s to secure the country's long term energy independence, through the use of uranium and thorium reserves found in the monazite sands of coastal regions of South India.

Thorium is particularly attractive for India, as India has only around 1–2% of the global uranium reserves, but one of the largest shares of global thorium reserves at about 25% of the world's known thorium reserves. However, thorium is more difficult to use than uranium as a fuel because it requires breeding, and global uranium prices remain low enough that breeding is not cost effective.

India published about twice the number of papers on thorium as its nearest competitors, during each of the years from 2002 to 2006. The Indian nuclear establishment estimates that the country could produce 500 GWe for at least four centuries using just the country's economically extractable thorium reserves.

The first Prototype Fast Breeder Reactor has been repeatedly delayed – and was commissioned in March 2024 – and India continues to import thousands of tonnes of uranium from Russia, Kazakhstan, France, and Uzbekistan. The 2005 Indo–US Nuclear Deal and the NSG waiver, which ended more than three decades of international isolation of the Indian civil nuclear programme, have created many hitherto unexplored alternatives for the success of the three-stage nuclear power programme.

== Origin and rationale ==
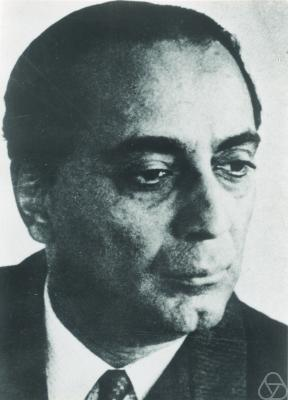
Homi Jehangir Bhabha, the founding Chairman of India's Atomic Energy Commission and the architect of Indian three-stage (thorium) programme

Homi Bhabha conceived of the three-stage nuclear programme as a way to develop nuclear energy by working around India's limited uranium resources. Thorium itself is not a fissile material, and thus cannot undergo fission to produce energy. Instead, it must be transmuted to uranium-233 in a reactor fueled by other fissile materials. The first two stages, natural uranium-fueled heavy water reactors and plutonium-fueled fast breeder reactors, are intended to generate sufficient fissile material from India's limited uranium resources, so that all its vast thorium reserves can be fully utilised in the third stage of thermal breeder reactors.

Bhabha summarised the rationale for the three-stage approach as follows:

The total reserves of thorium in India amount to over 500,000 tons in the readily extractable form, while the known reserves of uranium are less than a tenth of this. The aim of long range atomic power programme in India must therefore be to base the nuclear power generation as soon as possible on thorium rather than uranium… The first generation of atomic power stations based on natural uranium can only be used to start off an atomic power programme… The plutonium produced by the first generation power stations can be used in a second generation of power stations designed to produce electric power and convert thorium into U-233, or depleted uranium into more plutonium with breeding gain… The second generation of power stations may be regarded as an intermediate step for the breeder power stations of the third generation all of which would produce more U-233 than they burn in the course of producing power.

In November 1954, Bhabha presented the three-stage plan for national development at the conference on "Development of Atomic Energy for Peaceful Purposes" which was also attended by India's first Prime Minister Jawaharlal Nehru. Four years later, the Indian government formally adopted the three-stage plan. Indian energy resource base was estimated to be capable of yielding a total electric power output of the order shown in the table below. Indian government recognised that thorium was a source that could provide power to the Indian people for the long term.

Energy resource type	Amount (tonnes)	Power potential (TWe-year)
Coal	54 billion	11
Hydrocarbons	12 billion	6
Uranium (in PHWR)	61,000	0.3–0.42
Uranium (in FBR)	61,000	16–54
Thorium	~300,000	155–168 or 358

== Fuel reserves and research capability ==
According to a report issued by the IAEA, India has limited uranium reserves, consisting of approximately 54,636 tonnes of "reasonably assured resources", 25,245 tonnes of "estimated additional resources", 15,488 tonnes of "undiscovered conventional resources, and 17,000 tonnes of "speculative resources". According to NPCIL, these reserves are only sufficient to generate about 10 GWe for about 40 years. In July 2011, it was reported that a four-year-long mining survey done at Tummalapalle mine in Kadapa district near Hyderabad had yielded confirmed reserve figure of 49,000 tonnes with a potential that it could rise to 150,000 tonnes. This was a rise from an earlier estimate of 15,000 tonnes for that area.

Although India has only around 1–2% of the global uranium reserves, thorium reserves are bigger; around 12–33% of global reserves, according to IAEA and US Geological Survey. Several in-depth independent studies put Indian thorium reserves at 30% of the total world thorium reserves. Indian uranium production is constrained by government investment decisions rather than by any shortage of ore.

As per official estimates shared in the country's Parliament in August 2011, the country can obtain 846,477 tonnes of thorium from 963,000 tonnes of ThO_{2}, which in turn can be obtained from 10.7 million tonnes of monazite occurring in beaches and river sands in association with other heavy metals. Indian monazite contains about 9–10% ThO_{2}. The 846,477 tonne figure compares with the earlier estimates for India, made by IAEA and US Geological Survey of 319,000 tonnes and 290,000 to 650,000 tonnes respectively. The 800,000 tonne figure is given by other sources as well.

It was further clarified in the country's parliament on 21 March 2012 that, "Out of nearly 100 deposits of the heavy minerals, at present only 17 deposits containing about 4 million tonnes of monazite have been identified as exploitable. Mine-able reserves are ~70% of identified exploitable resources. Therefore, about 225,000 tonnes of thorium metal is available for nuclear power program."

India is a leader of thorium based research. It is also by far the most committed nation as far as the use of thorium fuel is concerned, and no other country has done as much neutron physics work on thorium. The country published about twice the number of papers on thorium as its nearest competitors during each of the years from 2002 to 2006. Bhabha Atomic Research Centre (BARC) had the highest number of publications in the thorium area, across all research institutions in the world during the period 1982–2004. During this same period, India ranks an overall second behind the United States in the research output on Thorium. According to Siegfried Hecker, a former director (1986–1997) of the Los Alamos National Laboratory in the United States, "India has the most technically ambitious and innovative nuclear energy programme in the world. The extent and functionality of its nuclear experimental facilities are matched only by those in Russia and are far ahead of what is left in the US."

However, conventional uranium-fueled reactors are much cheaper to operate; so India imports large quantities of uranium from abroad. Also, in March 2011, large deposits of uranium were discovered in the Tummalapalle belt in the southern part of the Kadapa basin in Andhra Pradesh.

== Stage I – Pressurised Heavy Water Reactor ==
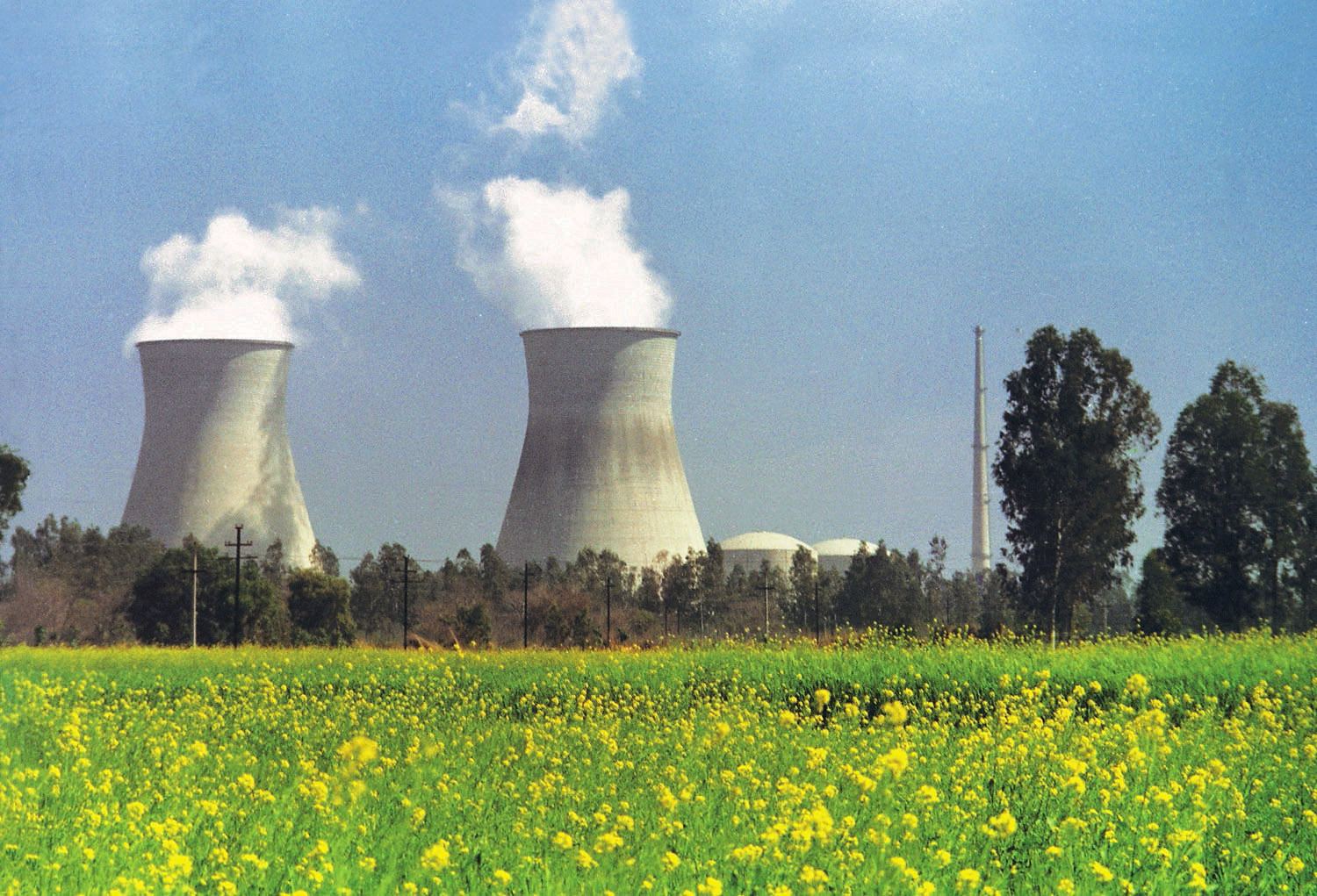
The Narora Atomic Power Station has two IPHWR reactors, the first stage of the three stage program

In the first stage of the programme, natural uranium fueled pressurised heavy water reactors (PHWR) produce electricity while generating plutonium-239 as by-product. PHWRs was a natural choice for implementing the first stage because it had the most efficient reactor design in terms of uranium utilisation, and the existing Indian infrastructure in the 1960s allowed for quick adoption of the PHWR technology. India correctly calculated that it would be easier to create heavy water production facilities (required for PHWRs) than uranium enrichment facilities (required for LWRs). Natural uranium contains only 0.7% of the fissile isotope uranium-235. Most of the remaining 99.3% is uranium-238 which is not fissile but can be converted in a reactor to the fissile isotope plutonium-239. Heavy water (deuterium oxide, D_{2}O) is used as moderator and coolant. Since the program began, India has developed a series of sequentially larger PHWR's under the IPHWR series derived from the original Canadian supplied CANDU reactors. The IPHWR series consists of three designs of 220 MWe, 540 MWe and 700 MWe capacity under the designations IPHWR-220, IPHWR-540 and IPHWR-700 respectively.

Indian uranium reserves are capable of generating a total power capacity of 420 GWe-years, but the Indian government limited the number of PHWRs fueled exclusively by indigenous uranium reserves, in an attempt to ensure that existing plants get a lifetime supply of uranium. US analysts calculate this limit as being slightly over 13 GW in capacity. Several other sources estimate that the known reserves of natural uranium in the country permit only about 10 GW of capacity to be built through indigenously fueled PHWRs. The three-stage programme explicitly incorporates this limit as the upper cut off of the first stage, beyond which PHWRs are not planned to be built.

Almost the entire existing base of Indian nuclear power (4780 MW) is composed of first stage PHWRs of the IPHWR series, with the exception of the two Boiling Water Reactor (BWR) units at Tarapur. The installed capacity of Kaiga station is now 880 MW consisting of four 220 MWe IPHWR-220 reactors, making it the third largest after Tarapur (1400 MW) (2 x BWR Mark-1, 2 x IPHWR-540) and Rawatbhata (1180 MW) (2 x CANDU, 2 x IPHWR-220). The remaining three power stations at Kakrapar, Kalpakkam and Narora all have 2 units of 220 MWe, thus contributing 440 MW each to the grid. The 2 units of 700 MWe each (IPHWR-700) that are under construction at both Kakrapar and Rawatbhata, and the one planned for Banswara would also come under the first stage of the programme, totalling a further addition of 4200 MW. These additions will bring the total power capacity from the first stage PHWRs to near the total planned capacity of 10 GW called for by the three-stage power programme.

Capital costs of PHWRs is in the range of Rs. 6 to 7 crore ($1.2 to $1.4 million) per MW, coupled with a designed plant life of 40 years. Time required for construction has improved over time and is now at about five years. Tariffs of the operating plants are in the range of Rs. 1.75 to 2.80 per unit, depending on the life of the reactor. In the year 2007–08 the average tariff was Rs. 2.28.

India is also working on the design of reactors based on the more efficient Pressurized Water Reactor technology derived from the work on the Arihant-class submarine program to develop a 900 MWe IPWR-900 reactor platform to supplement the currently deployed PHWR's of the IPHWR series.

== Stage II – Fast Breeder Reactor ==
In the second stage, fast breeder reactors (FBRs) would use a mixed oxide (MOX) fuel made from plutonium-239, recovered by reprocessing spent fuel from the first stage, and natural uranium. In FBRs, plutonium-239 undergoes fission to produce energy, while the uranium-238 present in the mixed oxide fuel transmutes to additional plutonium-239. Thus, the Stage II FBRs are designed to "breed" more fuel than they consume. Once the inventory of plutonium-239 is built up thorium can be introduced as a blanket material in the reactor and transmuted to uranium-233 for use in the third stage.

The surplus plutonium bred in each fast reactor can be used to set up more such reactors, and might thus grow the Indian civil nuclear power capacity till the point where the third stage reactors using thorium as fuel can be brought online, which is forecasted as being possible once 50 GW of nuclear power capacity has been achieved. The uranium in the first stage PHWRs that yield 29 EJ of energy in the once-through fuel cycle, can be made to yield between 65 and 128 times more energy through multiple cycles in fast breeder reactors.

The design of the country's first fast breeder, called Prototype Fast Breeder Reactor (PFBR), was done by Indira Gandhi Centre for Atomic Research (IGCAR). Bharatiya Nabhikiya Vidyut Nigam Ltd (Bhavini), a public sector company under the Department of Atomic Energy (DAE), has been given the responsibility to build the fast breeder reactors in India. The construction of this PFBR at Kalpakkam was due to be completed in 2012. It is not yet complete. The date of commission has been delayed to October 2022 from the previous date in 2019.

=== Doubling time ===
Doubling time refers to the time required to extract as output, double the amount of fissile fuel, which was fed as input into the breeder reactors. (Note: For analysis purposes, "doubling time" can be defined in three separate ways: Reactor Doubling Time (RDT) – which is the doubling that takes place within the reactor, System Doubling Time (SDT) – which is the doubling that takes into account all fuel losses that take place outside the reactor and Compounded System Doubling Time (CSDT) – which is the doubling that takes into account the fact that net gain in fissile material is promptly used to start up other reactors.(Tongia & Arunachalam 1997).) This metric is critical for understanding the time durations that are unavoidable while transitioning from the second stage to the third stage of Bhabha's plan, because building up a sufficiently large fissile stock is essential to the large deployment of the third stage. In Bhabha's 1958 papers on role of thorium, he pictured a doubling time of 5–6 years for breeding U-233 in the Th–U233 cycle. This estimate has now been revised to 70 years due to technical difficulties that were unforeseen at the time. Despite such setbacks, according to publications done by DAE scientists, the doubling time of fissile material in the fast breeder reactors can be brought down to about 10 years by choosing appropriate technologies with short doubling time.

Fuel type	U238–Pu cycle	Th–U233 cycle
oxide	17.8	108
carbide-Lee	10	50
metal	8.5	75.1
carbide	10.2	70

Another report prepared for U.S. Department of Energy suggests a doubling time of 22 years for oxide fuel, 13 years for carbide fuel and 10 years for metal fuel.

== Stage III – Thorium Based Reactors ==
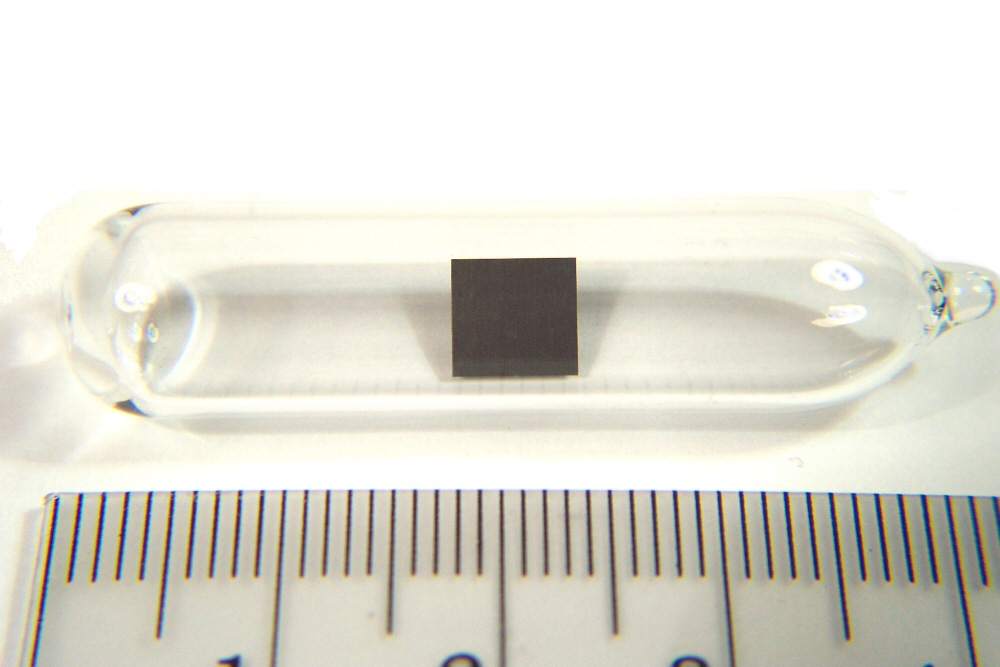
A sample of thorium

A Stage III reactor or an Advanced nuclear power system involves a self-sustaining series of thorium-232–uranium-233 fuelled reactors. This would be a thermal breeder reactor, which in principle can be refueled – after its initial fuel charge – using only naturally occurring thorium. According to the three-stage programme, Indian nuclear energy could grow to about 10 GW through PHWRs fueled by domestic uranium, and the growth above that would have to come from FBRs till about 50GW. (Note: An earlier version of the three-stage plan called for 15 GWe to be generated through PHWRs and 25GWe to be generated through FBRs fueled by the plutonium reprocessed from PHWRs, before the introduction of thorium was to be done.(Subramanian 1998).) The third stage is to be deployed only after this capacity has been achieved.

According to replies given in Q&A in the Indian Parliament on two separate occasions, 19 August 2010 and 21 March 2012, large scale thorium deployment is only to be expected "3–4 decades after the commercial operation of fast breeder reactors with short doubling time". Full exploitation of India's domestic thorium reserves will likely not occur until after the year 2050.

=== Parallel approaches ===
As there is a long delay before direct thorium utilisation in the three-stage programme, the country is looking at reactor designs that allow more direct use of thorium in parallel with the sequential three-stage programme. Three options under consideration are the Indian Accelerator Driven Systems (IADS), Advanced Heavy Water Reactor (AHWR) and Compact High Temperature Reactor. Molten Salt Reactor may also be under consideration based on some recent reports and is under development.

==== Advanced Heavy Water Reactor (AHWR) ====
Of the options, the design for AHWR is ready for deployment. AHWR is a 300 MWe vertical pressure tube type, boiling light water cooled and heavy water moderated reactor, using uranium233–thorium MOX and plutonium–thorium MOX. It is expected to generate 65% of its power from thorium and can also be configured to accept other fuel types in full core including enriched uranium and uranium–plutonium MOX. There was a plan for constructing such an AHWR with a plutonium–thorium core combination in 2007. This AHWR design was sent for an independent pre-licensing design safety review by the Atomic Energy Regulatory Board (AERB), the results of which were deemed satisfactory. AHWR would offer very little growth for the fuel build up that is essential for wide deployment of the third stage, and perhaps the impact on the accumulated fissile material could even be negative.

The AHWR design that will be taken up for construction is to be fueled with 20% low enriched uranium (LEU) and 80% thorium. The low enriched uranium (LEU) for this AHWR design is readily available on the world market. As of November 2011, construction will start after the site is identified in 6 months time. It will take another 18 months to get clearances on regulatory and environmental grounds. Construction is estimated to take six years. If everything goes according to plan, AHWR could be operational in India by 2020. In Aug 2017 the AHWR location was still not announced.

==== Accelerator Driven System ====
India's Department of Atomic Energy and US's Fermilab are designing accelerator driven systems, which no other country currently uses for power.

==== Indian Molten Salt Breeder Reactor (IMSBR) ====
The Indian Molten Salt Breeder Reactor (IMSBR) is under development. Studies on conceptual design of the Indian Molten Salt Breeder Reactors (IMSBR) have been initiated.

== Linkages with the Indo–US nuclear deal ==
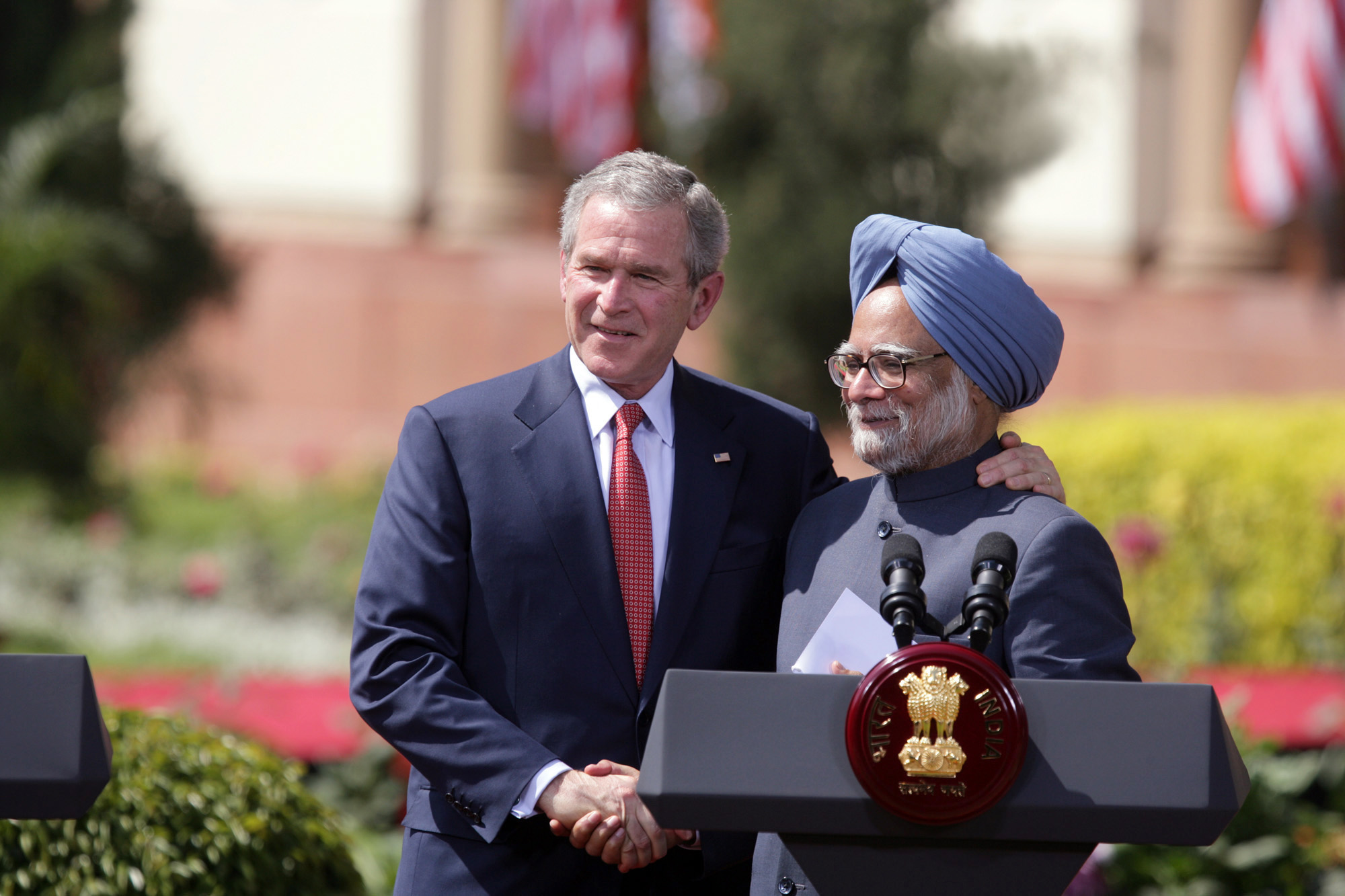
U.S. President George W. Bush and India's Prime Minister Manmohan Singh exchange greetings in New Delhi on 2 March 2006

In spite of the overall adequacy of its uranium reserves, Indian power plants could not get the necessary amount of uranium to function at full capacity in the late 2000s, primarily due to inadequate investments made in the uranium mining and milling capacity resulting from fiscal austerity in the early 1990s. One study done for U.S. Congress in that time period reaches the conclusion, "India's current fuel situation means that New Delhi cannot produce sufficient fuel for both its nuclear weapon programme and its projected civil nuclear programme." An independent study arrives at roughly the same conclusion, "India's current uranium production of less than 300 tons/year can meet at most, two-thirds of its needs for civil and military nuclear fuel." This uranium shortfall during the deal negotiations was understood by both players to be a temporary aberration that was poised to be resolved with requisite investments in India's uranium milling infrastructure.

=== Drivers for the deal from the Indian side ===
It was estimated that after attaining 21 GW from nuclear power by 2020, further growth might require imported uranium. This is problematic because deployment of third stage requires that 50 GW be already established through the first and second stages. If imported uranium was made available, Department of Atomic Energy (DAE) estimated that India could reach 70 GW by 2032 and 275 GW by 2052. In such a scenario, the third stage could be made operational following the fast breeder implementation, and nuclear power capacity could grow to 530 GW. The estimated stagnation of the nuclear power at about 21GW by 2020 is likely due to the fact that even the short "doubling time" of the breeder reactors is quite slow, on the order of 10–15 years. Implementing the three-stage programme using the domestic uranium resources alone is feasible, but requires several decades to come to fruition. Imports of fissile material from outside would considerably speed up the programme.

As per research data, the U238–Pu cycle has the shortest doubling time by a large margin, and that technology's compounded yearly fissile material growth rate has been calculated as follows, after making some basic assumptions about the operating features of the fast breeder reactors.

Type	Fissile Material Growth %
oxide	1.73%
carbide-Lee	2.31%
metal	4.08%
carbide	3.15%

Indian power generation capacity has grown at 5.9% per annum in the 25-year period prior to 2006. If Indian economy is to grow at 8–9% for the next 25-year period of 2006 to 2032, total power generation capacity has to increase at 6–7% per annum. As the fissile material growth rate does not meet this objective, it becomes necessary to look at alternative approaches for obtaining the fissile material. This conclusion is mostly independent of future technical breakthroughs, and complementary to the eventual implementation of the three-stage approach. It was realised that the best way to get access to the requisite fissile material would be through uranium imports, which was not possible without ending India's nuclear isolation by U.S. and the NSG.

U.S. analyst Ashley J. Tellis argues that the Indo–US nuclear deal is attractive to India because it gives it access to far more options on its civil nuclear programme than would otherwise be the case, primarily by ending its isolation from the international nuclear community. These options include access to latest technologies, access to higher unit output reactors which are more economical, access to global finance for building reactors, ability to export its indigenous small reactor size PHWRs, better information flow for its research community, etc. Finally, the deal also gives India two options that are relatively independent from the three-stage programme, at least in terms of their dependencies on success or failure. The first option is that, India can opt to stay with the first stage reactors as long as the global supply of uranium lasts. The plus side of this is that it covers any risk from short term delays or failures in implementing the three-stage programme. On the negative side, this is an option that is antithetical to the underlying objective of energy independence through the exploitation of thorium.

The second option, and perhaps the more interesting one, is that India can choose to access the third stage of thorium reactors by skipping the more difficult second stage of the plan through some appropriately selected parallel approach such as the high-temperature gas-cooled reactor, the molten salt reactor, or the various accelerator driven systems.

=== Stakeholder views on the linkages ===
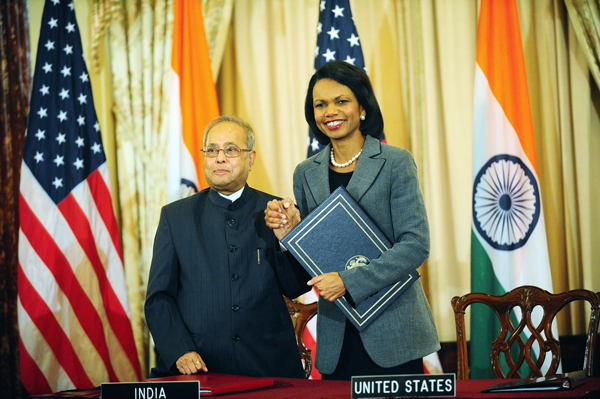
United States Secretary of State Condoleezza Rice and Indian External Affairs Minister Pranab Mukherjee, after signing the 123 Agreement in Washington, D.C., on 10 October 2008

Indian commentators welcomed the opportunity simply because they could see that India would be able end its international isolation on the nuclear front and obtain a de facto acknowledgement of it as a nuclear weapon state to some degree, in addition to it being able to obtain the uranium that would increase the success potential of its three-stage programme as well as its efforts to build a "minimum credible nuclear deterrent". It was estimated that the power produced by imported reactors could be 50% more expensive than the country's existing nuclear power cost. However, this was perceived as a minor point in the larger context of the deal. In a U.S. Senate Foreign Relations Committee hearing, Under Secretary for Political Affairs Nicholas Burns' prepared remarks stated that "India had made this the central issue in the new partnership developing between our countries". Indian government proceeded to negotiate and execute the Indo–US Nuclear Deal, which then paved the way for the NSG waiver on international uranium imports to India in 2008.

According to one foreign analyst, the deal could "over time… result in India being weaned away from its… three-phase nuclear program involving FBRs and advanced PHWRs. This would occur should India become confident that it would have assured supplies of relatively cheap natural uranium, including from Australia. Of course, nobody in the Indian nuclear establishment would yet admit to that possibility."

Anil Kakodkar, then Chairman of the Atomic Energy Commission, went to the extent of making public, the milder position of keeping the country's indigenous fast breeder programme out of the ambit of international safeguards, saying "in the long run, the energy that will come out from the nuclear fuel resources available in India (from domestic uranium and thorium mines) should always form the larger share of the nuclear energy programme..." and "our strategy should be such that the integrity and autonomy of our being able to develop the three-stage nuclear power programme, be maintained, we cannot compromise that." The full demand of the Indian scientists, to have the ability to reprocess plutonium from spent fuel of the imported reactors (goes beyond the defensive position of Kakodkar), appears to have been met in the final deal.

According to the Indian government's official position, India's indigenous three-stage nuclear power programme is unaffected by the Indo–US Nuclear Deal; "Its full autonomy has been preserved." Both right and left-wing political parties opposed the deal in the Parliament. The left feared the deal would make the country subservient to U.S. interests, while the right felt it would limit further nuclear testing.

According to one view within the Indian defence establishment, the deal "has for all practical purposes capped Indian ability to field test and proof high yield nuclear weapons till some time in future (about 20 years) when Indian three-stage nuclear fuel cycle based on Thorium fuel matures into mainstream power production, thus eliminating Indian dependence on imported nuclear fuel from NSG countries or if there is a breakout in global nuclear test moratorium."

== Indian nuclear energy forecasts ==
Nuclear power stations in India (view)
Active plants
Under construction
Planned plants

On the basis of the three-stage plan and assuming optimistic development times, some extravagant predictions about nuclear power have been made over the years:

Bhabha announced that there would be 8,000 MW of nuclear power in the country by 1980. As the years progressed, these predictions were to increase. By 1962, the prediction was that nuclear energy would generate 20,000–25,000 MW by 1987, and by 1969, the AEC predicted that by 2000 there would be 43,500 MW of nuclear generating capacity. All of this was before a single unit of nuclear electricity was produced in the country. Reality was quite different. Installed capacity in 1979–80 was about 600 MW, about 950 MW in 1987, and 2720 MW in 2000.

In 2007, after five decades of sustained and generous government financial support, nuclear power's capacity was just 3,310 MW, less than 3% of India's total power generation capacity.

The Integrated Energy Policy of India estimates the share of nuclear power in the total primary energy mix to be between 4% and 6.4% in various scenarios by the year 2031–32. A study by the DAE, estimates that the nuclear energy share will be about 8.6% by the year 2032 and 16.6% by the year 2052. The possible nuclear power capacity beyond the year 2020 has been estimated by DAE is shown in the table. The 63 GW expected by 2032 will be achieved by setting up 16 indigenous Pressurised Heavy Water Reactors (PHWR), of which ten is to be based on reprocessed uranium. Out of the 63 GW, about 40 GW will be generated through the imported Light Water Reactors (LWR), made possible after the NSG waiver.

Year	Pessimistic (GWe)	Optimistic (GWe)
2030	48	63
2040	104	131
2050	208	275

Indian Prime Minister Manmohan Singh stated in 2009 that the nation could generate up to 470 GW of power by 2050 if it managed the three-stage program well. "This will sharply reduce our dependence on fossil fuels and will be a major contribution to global efforts to combat climate change", he reportedly said. According to plan, 30% of the Indian electricity in 2050 will be generated from thorium based reactors. Indian nuclear scientists estimate that the country could produce 500 GWe for at least four centuries using just the country's economically extractable thorium reserves.

== Thorium energy forecasts ==
According to the Chairman of India's Atomic Energy Commission, Srikumar Banerjee, without the implementation of fast breeders the presently available uranium reserves of 5.469 million tonnes can support 570 GWe till 2025. If the total identified and undiscovered uranium reserves of 16 million tonnes are brought online, the power availability can be extended till the end of the century. While calling for more research into thorium as an energy source and the country's indigenous three-stage programme, he said, "The world always felt there would be a miracle. Unfortunately, we have not seen any miracle for the last 40 years. Unless we wake up, humans won't be able to exist beyond this century."

== See also ==
Nuclear and energy related

- Energy security
- Energy policy of India
- Nuclear Liability Act
- Nuclear power in India
- Thermal reactor

Weapons of mass destruction

- India–United States Civil Nuclear Agreement
- Weapons of mass destruction
- Nuclear Command Authority (India)
- Indian weapons of mass destruction

== Sources ==
=== Books ===
- Diwan, Parag; Sarkar, A.N. (2009), "Energy Security", Volume 5, Pentagon Press, ISBN 978-81-8274-352-6
- Ferguson, Charles D. (2007), "Assessing the Vulnerability of the Indian Civil Nuclear Programme to Military and Terrorist Attack", in Henry D. Sokolski (ed.), Gauging U.S.–India Strategic Cooperation, Army War College (U.S.). Strategic Studies Institute, ISBN 978-1-58487-284-9
- Venkataraman, Ganesan (1994), Bhabha and His Magnificent Obsessions, Universities Press (India) Ltd., ISBN 978-81-7371-007-0
- Iyengar, P.K.; Prasad, A.N.; Gopalakrishnan, A.; Karnad, Bharat (2009), Strategic Sell-Out: Indian–US Nuclear Deal, Pentagon Press, ISBN 978-81-8274-432-5
- Ramana, M.V. (2007), "Nuclear Power in India: Failed Past, Dubious Future" (PDF), in Henry D. Sokolski (ed.), Gauging U.S.–India Strategic Cooperation, Army War College (U.S.). Strategic Studies Institute, ISBN 978-1-58487-284-9, archived from the original (PDF) on 22 July 2016
- Krivit, Steven; Lehr, Jay H.; Kingery, Thomas B. (2011), Nuclear Energy Encyclopedia: Science, Technology and Applications, Wiley Series on Energy, John Wiley & Sons, ISBN 978-0-470-89439-2
- Noronha, Ligia (2009), Ligia Noronha; Anant Sudarshan (eds.), India's Energy Politics, Taylor and Francis, ISBN 978-0-203-88436-2
- Stephenson, John; Tynan, Peter (2007), "Will the U.S.–India Civil Nuclear Cooperation Initiative Light India?", in Henry D. Sokolski (ed.), Gauging U.S.–India Strategic Cooperation, Army War College (U.S.). Strategic Studies Institute, ISBN 978-1-58487-284-9
- Rai, Ajai K. (2009), India's Nuclear Diplomacy After Pokhran II, Pearson Education India, ISBN 978-81-317-2668-6
- Raven, Peter H.; Hassenzahl, David M.; Berg, Linda R. (2012), Environment (8 ed.), John Wiley & Sons, ISBN 978-0470-94570-4, archived from the original on 14 August 2024
- Woddi, Taraknath V.K.; Charlton, William S.; Nelson, Paul (2009), India's nuclear fuel cycle: Unraveling the impact of the US–India nuclear accord, Synthesis Lectures on Nuclear Technology and Society, Morgan & Claypool Publishers, ISBN 978-1-59829-984-7, archived from the original on 14 August 2024

=== Official government disclosures ===
- Right to Reprocess Nuclear Fuel (PDF), Department of Atomic Energy, 19 August 2010
- Second Stage Development of Atomic Energy (PDF), Department of Atomic Energy, 19 August 2010
- Thorium Based NPP (PDF), Department of Atomic Energy, 21 March 2012
- Availability of Thorium, Press Information Bureau, Government of India, 10 August 2011, archived from the original on 10 September 2012
- FAQs on the India–US Agreement for Co-operation concerning Peaceful Uses of Nuclear Energy, Ministry of External Affairs, Government of India, archived from the original on 16 November 2011
- Burns, Nicholas (2 November 2005), "Hearing on U.S.–India Civil Nuclear Cooperation Initiative" (PDF), Remarks as Prepared for the Senate Foreign Relations Committee, U.S. Department of State, archived from the original (PDF) on 5 March 2013

=== Studies, papers and reports ===
- Majumdar, S. (1999), "Experience of thorium fuel development in India", BARC, Vienna: IAEA, archived from the original on 7 October 2011
- Bucher, R.G. (January 2009), India's Baseline Plan for Nuclear Energy self-sufficiency stage (PDF), Argonne National Laboratory, archived from the original (PDF) on 27 December 2016
- Gordon, Sandy (September 2008), "Implications of the Sale of Australian Uranium to India" (PDF), Working Paper No. 410, Canberra: Strategic and Defence Studies Centre, archived from the original (PDF) on 18 May 2013
- Hargraves, Robert, Aim High (PDF), Thorium Energy Alliance, archived from the original (PDF) on 22 April 2014
- Jayaram, K.M.V., An Overview of World Thorium Resources, Incentives for Further Exploration and Forecasts for Thorium Requirements in the Near Future (PDF), Hyderabad: IAEA, archived from the original (PDF) on 28 June 2011
- Kalidas, R. (2007), "Indo–US Nuclear Deal", The IUP Journal of Governance and Public Policy, II (1), archived from the original on 17 August 2024
- Banerjee, Srikumar (September 2010), Thorium Utilisation for Sustainable Supply of Nuclear Energy (PDF), Virginia Tech, archived (PDF) from the original on 15 May 2013
- Jain, S.K. (2009), Nuclear Power – An alternative (PDF), NPCIL, archived from the original (PDF) on 3 September 2013
- Maitra, Ramtanu (23 January 2009), "Indian Nuclear Program at a Crossroads" (PDF), Executive Intelligence Review, archived from the original (PDF) on 22 May 2013
- Mian, Zia; Nayyar, A.H.; Rajaraman, R.; Ramana, M.V. (September 2006), Fissile Materials in South Asia: The Implications of the U.S.–India Nuclear Deal (PDF), International Panel on Fissile Materials, archived from the original (PDF) on 12 January 2012
- Mukherjee, A.B. (25 October 2018). "IPWR Indian Pressurized Water Reactor". India Energy Forum (10th Nuclear Conclave). Archived from the original on 12 April 2021.
- Raj, Devesh; Kannan, Umasankari (10 March 2020). "Estimation of safety parameters of equilibrium cycle of Indian Pressurized Water Reactor (IPWR)". Life Cycle Reliability and Safety Engineering. 9 (2): 129–134. doi:10.1007/s41872-020-00115-2. S2CID 216161923. Archived from the original on 19 February 2023.
- Rethinaraj, T.S. Gopi (5 June 2006), U.S.–India Nuclear Deal (PDF), Washington D.C.: Lee Kuan Yew School of Public Policy, National University of Singapore.
- Kademani, B.S. (12 September 2006), World literature on thorium research: A scientometric study based on Science Citation Index, Scientometrics
- Gadekar, Surendra (6 August 2008), India's nuclear fuel shortage, Bulletin of the Atomic Scientists, archived from the original on 7 March 2012
- Sethi, Manpreet, The Nuclear Energy Imperative (PDF), IDFC, archived from the original (PDF) on 14 February 2019
- Tongia, Rahul; Arunachalam, V.S. (15 December 1997), "India's Nuclear Breeders: Technology, Viability and Options", 75(6), Pittsburgh: Current Science, pp. 549–558, archived from the original on 28 June 2017
- Nuclear Power in India, World Nuclear Association, March 2012, archived from the original on 18 September 2012
- Kerr, Paul K. (11 December 2011), U.S. Nuclear Cooperation with India: Issues for Congress (PDF), Congressional Research Service, archived (PDF) from the original on 1 March 2012
- Puri, Raman (2007), "Indo–US Nuclear Deal: The Technology Dimension", vol. II, issue 4, The IUP Journal of Governance and Public Policy, archived from the original on 17 February 2015
- Gupta, Arvind (May 2011), "India's Nuclear Energy Programme: Prospects and Challenges", vol 35, issue 3, vol. 35, no. 3, Strategic Analysis, pp. 373–380, doi:10.1080/09700161.2011.559963, S2CID 153516024
- Harvey, Cole J. (5 May 2010), "The U.S.–India Reprocessing Agreement and Its Implications", James Martin Centre for Nonproliferation Studies at the Monterey Institute of International Studies, Nuclear Threat Initiative, archived from the original on 12 June 2014
- Tellis, Ashley J. (2006), Atoms for War? U.S.–Indian Civil Nuclear Cooperation and India's Nuclear Arsenal (PDF), Carnegie Endowment for International Peace, archived (PDF) from the original on 2 March 2012
- Vishwakarma, Arun S. (January–March 2009), "Way to a Credible Deterrent", Vol 24.1, Indian Defence Review, archived from the original on 15 March 2012

=== News articles ===
- "India leading research on Thorium: US official", The Economic Times, Press Trust of India, 20 May 2010, archived from the original on 14 August 2024
- A future energy giant? India's thorium-based nuclear plans, Physorg.com, 1 October 2010, archived from the original on 17 January 2012
- "India's thorium success", The Financial Express, 13 May 2008, archived from the original on 14 August 2024
- McHugh, Liam, India Seeks Energy Security from Thorium, Australia: Future Directions International, archived from the original on 26 March 2015
- Fin, Al (1 July 2011), A Brief Overview of Thorium Energy, oilprice.com, archived from the original on 11 March 2012
- Patel, Sonal (1 November 2009), India Designs Thorium-Fueled Reactor for Export, powermag.com, archived from the original on 3 February 2012
- Bromby, Robin (16 November 2011), "Thorium a safer option", The Australian, archived from the original on 2 June 2012
- Bedi, Rahul (19 July 2011), "Largest uranium reserves found in India", The Telegraph, archived from the original on 12 January 2022
- Dharur, Suresh (22 April 2012), "AP houses one of world's largest uranium reserves", The Tribune, Hyderabad, archived from the original on 26 April 2012
- "India's 20th nuclear reactor connected to power grid", The Times of India, Press Trust of India, 19 January 2011, archived from the original on 18 November 2011
- "L&T bags Rs 844 crore order for Kakrapar Atomic Power Station", Business Standard, Mumbai/Ahmedabad, 9 December 2009, archived from the original on 14 August 2024
- "BARC begins work on 900 MW pressurised water reactor". Business Standard. Indo-Asian News Service. 12 August 2013. Archived from the original on 11 April 2021.
- "Start-up of India's PFBR delayed". Nuclear Engineering International. 11 August 2014. Archived from the original on 14 August 2024.
- Sasi, Anil (27 August 2014). "India widens N-fuel base, signs up Uzbek firm for uranium supplies". The Indian Express. Archived from the original on 31 August 2014.
- Jayan, T.V. (21 March 2011), "Fuelling Fear", The Telegraph, archived from the original on 17 February 2015
- Jha, Saurav (25 March 2019). "Waiting for the Fast Breeder Reactor". Deccan Herald.
- Construction started for 2 700MW PHWRs at Kakrapar, World Nuclear News, 22 November 2010
- Construction starts on 2 700 MWe PHWRs in Rajasthan, World Nuclear News, 18 July 2011
- "Nuclear power plant will be a big boon for Rajasthan", The Hindu, Jaipur, 10 August 2011, archived from the original on 5 July 2014
- "India's first PFBR to go critical early 2013", ZeeNews, Chennai, Indo-Asian News Service, 21 January 2012
- Srikanth (27 November 2011), "80% of work on fast breeder reactor at Kalpakkam over", The Hindu, Kalpakkam
- Jaganathan, Venkatachari (11 May 2011), "India's new fast-breeder on track, nuclear power from September next", TNN, Chennai, archived from the original on 13 May 2013
- "Development work on 300 MW advanced heavy water reactor at advanced stage", The Times of India, Chennai, 20 December 2008, archived from the original on 11 August 2011
- Bilbao y León, Sama (27 March 2012), Mumbai engages ADS for nuclear energy, Mumbai: Cern Courier
- Kalam, A.P.J. Abdul (6 November 2011), "Nuclear power is our gateway to a prosperous future", The Hindu
- "India to begin construction of AHWR", The Economic Times, Chidambaram (TN, India), Press Trust of India, 4 January 2007, archived from the original on 17 February 2015
- "AHWR undergoes design changes to increase safety, security", OneIndia News, Mumbai, Press Trust of India, 20 April 2011
- India designs new version of AHWR for thorium use, Mumbai: ZeeNews, 16 September 2009
- India Turns to Thorium As Future Reactor Fuel, Nuclear Energy Institute, 2012
- "Work on thorium-based reactor to commence soon", Business Line, Chennai, Press Trust of India, 21 February 2012
- Kamat, Nandkumar (31 May 2010), "Redefining Energy Security for India", The Navhind Times, archived from the original on 3 June 2010
- Rahman, Maseeh (1 November 2011a), "How Homi Bhabha's vision turned India into a nuclear R&D leader", The Guardian, Mumbai
- Rahman, Maseeh (1 November 2011b), "India plans 'safer' nuclear plant powered by thorium", The Guardian, Mumbai
- Subramanian, T.S. (December 1998), "A debate over breeder reactors", Vol. 15, No. 25, Frontline
- Subramanian, T.S. (25 February 2006), "Indo-US nuke deal will help launch thorium reactors", The Times of India, Press Trust of India, archived from the original on 10 September 2011
- Subramanian, T.S. (21 April – 4 May 2007), "Total self-sufficiency in PHWR programme", Frontline, vol. 24, no. 8, Mumbai, archived from the original on 12 October 2007
- Subramaniam, Kandula (11 June 2008), "Now, fuel crunch takes toll on Kalpakkam unit", The Indian Express, New Delhi
- Subrahmanyam, K. (12 December 2005), "India and the nuclear deal", The Times of India
- Bagla, Pallava (6 February 2006), "US shifting goalpost on n-deal: Atomic Energy chief", Indian Express Review, New Delhi, Press Trust of India
- "India eyeing 63,000 MW nuclear power capacity by 2032: NPCIL", The Economic Times, Chennai, Press Trust of India, 11 October 2011, archived from the original on 12 August 2011
- Ramesh, Randeep (29 September 2009), "India plans to cut carbon and fuel poverty with untested nuclear power", The Guardian, Delhi
- Dikshit, Sandeep (9 March 2010), "Revive R&D in thorium, says India", The Hindu, Paris, archived from the original on 28 October 2012

=== Primary sources ===
- Founder's Day 2007 Address by Chairman of Atomic Energy Commission – Anil Kakodkar, BARC, 2007, archived from the original on 12 December 2010
- IEEE Spectrum Q&A With: Sudhinder Thakur
- IEEE Spectrum Q&A: Thorium Reactor Designer Ratan Kumar Sinha

=== Further reading ===
==== Studies, papers and reports ====
- Rhodes, Prof. Chris (26 February 2012), The Thorium Age Waits in the Wings, Energy Balance Blog, archived from the original on 15 April 2012
- Sorensen, Kirk (25 July 2007), Thorium-based Nuclear Power: The Road to Green, Sustainable Nuclear Power (PDF), NASA, archived from the original (PDF) on 18 October 2011
- Hore-Lacy, Ian (6 December 2009), Thorium, The Encyclopedia of Earth, archived from the original on 14 August 2024

==== News articles ====
- Jha, Alok (9 September 2011), "UK public confidence in nuclear remains steady despite Fukushima", The Guardian, archived from the original on 14 August 2024
- Clark, Duncan (13 July 2009), "Thorium nuclear power", The Guardian, archived from the original on 14 August 2024
- Rodricks, Dan (9 May 2011), "Thor's nuclear-powered hammer", The Baltimore Sun, archived from the original on 21 June 2011

==== Web books ====
- MacKay, David J.C. (2009), "Thorium", Sustainable Energy – Without the Hot Air, p. 166, archived from the original on 4 June 2016
