= Mahi Banswara Atomic Power Plant =

Nuclear power plant near Banswara, Rajasthan

Mahi Banswara Rajasthan Atomic Power Plant (MBRAPP)
- Country: India
- Location: Banswara, Rajasthan
- Coordinates: 23°31′46″N 74°35′26″E
- Construction began: April 2026
- Construction cost: ₹50,000 crore (US$5.2 billion)
- Owners: ASHVINI JV - Anushakti Vidhyut Nigam (NPCIL - 51% and NTPC - 49%)
- Operator: ASHVINI

Nuclear power station
- Reactor type: IPHWR-700
- Reactor supplier: NPCIL/BARC
- Cooling source: Mahi Bajaj Sagar Dam, Mahi River

Power generation
- Units planned: 4 x 700 MW
- Nameplate capacity: 2800 MW

The Mahi Banswara Rajasthan Atomic Power Plant (MBRAPP) is a under construction nuclear power plant to be built on a 1,366.49 acres (553.00 ha) area, near Banswara district of Rajasthan.

The project will have an installed capacity of 2800 Megawatts (MW). On 9 May 2025, the Atomic Energy Regulatory Board gave permission for the project.

Prime minister Narendra Modi laid the foundation stone for the plant on September the 25th, 2025 during his visit to Rajasthan. The first unit will commence construction soon thereafter and is expected to be operational in six and a half years according to sources. Ground breaking and excavation work started in late April 2026.

NPCIL is to float a tender worth ₹28,000 crore in 2026 for the construction of the nuclear island.

== History ==
Nestled in the tribal areas of Rajasthan, the Mahi Banswara project aims to kick start the region by providing jobs and investment opportunity and alleviating the power shortage in the state. The plant construction was scheduled for 2024 and will be jointly developed by NTPC and NPCIL. Along with Chutka Nuclear Power Plant, NTPC aims to generate 3500 MW of electricity from nuclear sources.

On 9 May 2025 the Atomic Energy Regulatory Board of India published siting consent for the proposed plant.

On 25th September 2025, Prime Minister Narendra Modi laid the foundation stone at the site, during his visit to Banswara district of Rajasthan. All the clearances have been granted, and the construction started with excavation work in April 2026.

== Design and specification ==
The proposed 700 MW IPHWR-700 reactors are indigenous and similar to the ones in operation at Kakrapar Atomic Power Station (KAPP-3 &4) and Rajasthan unit 8 and the unit currently under construction in Rajasthan Atomic Power Station (RAPP-8).

== Cost and economics ==
The plant is jointly built by the Nuclear Power Corporation of India and National Thermal Power Corporation Limited, the project is estimated to cost ₹50,000 crore (US$5.2 billion). The project is a part of the fleet mode reactor program of the Government of India under which 10 indigenous IPHWR-700 reactors are being built and the goal of 100 GWe nuclear capacity till 2047. The construction is to be started in 2025 and planned to be competed within 4-5 year.

== Units ==
Phase	Unit No.	Reactor		Status	Capacity in MWe		Construction start	First criticality	Grid Connection	Commercial operation	Closure	Notes
Phase	Unit No.	Type	Model	Status	Net	Gross	Construction start	First criticality	Grid Connection	Commercial operation	Closure	Notes
I	1	PHWR	IPHWR-700	Planned	630	700	—N/a	—N/a	—N/a	2031 (Planned)	—N/a	
I	2	PHWR	IPHWR-700	Planned	630	700	—N/a	—N/a	—N/a	—N/a	—N/a	
I	3	PHWR	IPHWR-700	Planned	630	700	—N/a	—N/a	—N/a	—N/a	—N/a	
I	4	PHWR	IPHWR-700	Planned	630	700	—N/a	—N/a	—N/a	—N/a	—N/a	

== See also ==
- IPHWR-700
- Nuclear power in India
