= Chutka Nuclear Power Plant =

Proposed nuclear power plant in Madhya Pradesh, India

- Country: India
- Location: Chutka Village, Mandla district, Madhya Pradesh
- Coordinates: 22°46′50″N 80°05′23″E
- Status: Proposed
- Construction cost: ₹25,000 crore (US$2.6 billion)
- Owner: NPCIL
- Operator: NPCIL

Nuclear power station
- Reactor type: IPHWR-700
- Reactor supplier: NPCIL/BARC
- Cooling source: Bargi Dam Reservoir, Narmada River

Power generation
- Units planned: 2 x 700 MW

The Chutka Nuclear Power Plant is a proposed nuclear power plant to be built on a 1,200 acres (490 ha) area, near Chutka Village of Mandla district of Madhya Pradesh. The site is near Kanha National Park, one of the tiger reserves of India and the largest national park of Madhya Pradesh state in India.

The project will have an installed capacity of 1400 megawatts (MW).

== History ==
After the government allotted 42 acres (17 ha) of land for the project, the Chutka, Tatighat, Kunda, Bhaliwara and Patha villagers decided to start an indefinite agitation from 25 October 2015. Most of them were displaced by the Bargi Dam in 1984. Meanwhile, within the 30-kilometre radius (19 mi) of the site, a survey was completed in the 2,828 square kilometres (1,092 sq mi) area, which is almost 60% covered with water, the remaining barren land and a small area of cultivated land with poor soil conditions. The survey was started in December 2012.

== Design and specification ==
The proposed 700 MW IPHWR-700 reactors are indigenous and similar to the ones currently under construction in Kakrapar Atomic Power Station (KAPP-3 &4) and Rajasthan Atomic Power Station (RAPP-7 & 8).

== Cost and economics ==
The plant will be built by the Nuclear Power Corporation of India, at an estimated cost of ₹25,000 crore (US$2.6 billion). The project is a part of the fleet mode reactor program of the Government of India under which 10 indigenous IPHWR-700 reactors are being built. The construction will start in 2025 and is planned to be completed within 6-7 years.

== Units ==
| Phase | Unit No. | Reactor | | Status | Capacity in MWe | | Construction start | First criticality | Grid Connection | Commercial operation | Closure | Notes |
| Phase | Unit No. | Type | Model | Status | Net | Gross | Construction start | First criticality | Grid Connection | Commercial operation | Closure | Notes |
|---|---|---|---|---|---|---|---|---|---|---|---|---|
| I | 1 | PHWR | IPHWR-700 | Planned | 630 | 700 | —N/a | —N/a | —N/a | —N/a | —N/a | |
| I | 2 | PHWR | IPHWR-700 | Planned | 630 | 700 | —N/a | —N/a | —N/a | —N/a | —N/a | |

== See also ==
- Nuclear power in India
