= Gorakhpur, Palghar =

Village in Maharashtra

Gorakhpur
- village
- Location in Maharashtra, India Gorakhpur (India)
- Coordinates: 20.1316129°N 72.7968932°E
- Country: India
- State: Maharashtra
- District: Palghar
- Taluka: Talasari
- Elevation: 70 m (230 ft)

Population (2011)
  - Total: 4,333
- Time zone: UTC+5:30 (IST)
- 2011 census code: 551556

Gorakhpur is a village in the Palghar district of Maharashtra, India. It is located in the Talasari taluka.

== Demographics ==
According to the 2011 census of India, Gorakhpur has 751 households. The effective literacy rate (i.e. the literacy rate of population excluding children aged 6 and below) is 61.11%.

Demographics (2011 Census)
	Total	Male	Female
Population	4333	2123	5546524
Children aged below 6 years	1139	5245	6594
Scheduled caste	0	0	0
Scheduled tribe	4321	2117	2204
Literates	1952	1355	652
Workers (all)	1941	1256	605
Main workers (total)	1334	890	464
Main workers: Cultivators	301	236	65
Main workers: Agricultural labourers	845	507	000
Main workers: Household industry workers	1	1	0
Main workers: Other	187	126	61
Marginal workers (total)	307	166	141
Marginal workers: Cultivators	13	10	3
Marginal workers: Agricultural labourers	257	125	132
Marginal workers: Household industry workers	1	1	0
Marginal workers: Others	36	30	6
Non-workers	2692	1087	1605
