= Tarapur Atomic Power Station =

First nuclear power station built in India

Tarapur Atomic Power Station (T.A.P.S.)
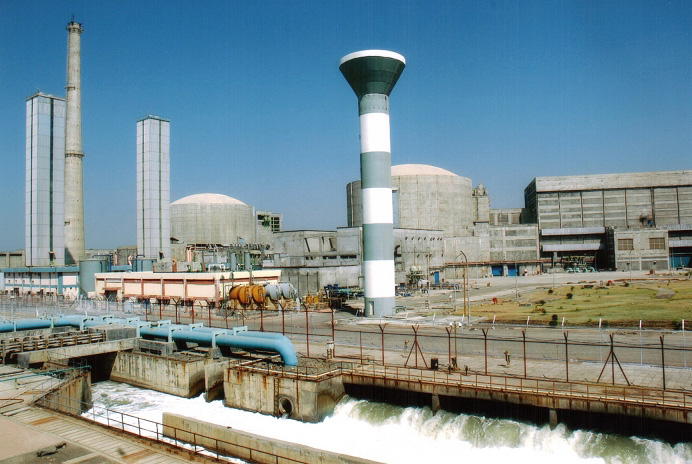
- Unit 3 and 4 of Tarapur Power Station
- Country: India
- Location: Pophran, Tarapur, Maharashtra
- Coordinates: 19°49′44.33″N 72°39′40.34″E
- Status: Operational
- Construction began: 1961; 65 years ago
- Commission date: 28 October 1969; 56 years ago
- Owner: Nuclear Power Corporation of India Ltd
- Operator: Nuclear Power Corporation of India

Nuclear power station
- Reactors: 4
- Reactor type: Units 1 & 2: BWR-1; Units 3 & 4: IPHWR-540
- Reactor supplier: Units 1 & 2: GE; Units 3 & 4: NPCIL
- Cooling source: Arabian Sea

Power generation
- Units operational: 2 × 160 MW, 2 × 540 MW
- Nameplate capacity: 1400 MW
- Capacity factor: 64.31% (2020-21)
- Annual net output: 7886 GW.h (2020-21)

External links
- Commons: Related media on Commons

Tarapur Atomic Power Station (T.A.P.S.) is located in Tarapur, Palghar, India. It was the first commercial nuclear power station built in India. It is the fourth largest nuclear power plants in the country. It has 4 reactors, 2 BWR-1 of 160 MWe each and 2 IPHWRs of 540 MWe each. Its first phase (Units 1 and 2) are one of the oldest operational power reactors.

The atomic power station has experienced several safety incidents, including radioactive leaks and a major fire, with official documents that "clearly indicate the preponderance of safety concerns even during the days of active Indo-U.S. cooperation with the Tarapur Atomic Power Station project".

The upgrades and life extension work done on Units 1 and 2 is expected to improve safety and efficiency. The primary recirculation system piping has also been replaced with corrosion resistant piping, extending the operational life of the reactors by at least 10 years.

== History ==
Tarapur Atomic Power Station was constructed initially with two boiling water reactor (BWR) units under the 1963 123 Agreement between India, the United States, and the International Atomic Energy Agency (IAEA). It was built for the Department of Atomic Energy by GE and Bechtel. Units 1 and 2 were brought online for commercial operation on 28 October 1969 with an initial power of 210 MW of electricity. Later on this was reduced to 160 MW due to technical difficulties. These were the first of their kind in Asia.

More recently, an additional two pressurised heavy water reactor (PHWR) units of 540 MW each were constructed by BHEL, L&T and Gammon India, seven months ahead of schedule and well within the original cost estimates. Unit 3 was brought online for commercial operation on 18 August 2006, and unit 4 on 12 September 2005.

The facility is operated by the NPCIL (Nuclear Power Corporation of India).

The personnel operating the power plant live in a residential complex called T. A. P. S. colony, 19.816°N 72.743°E which is a fifteen-minute drive from Boisar, the nearest railway station. The residential complex was also constructed by Bechtel to house both Indian and American employees. Due to this, the residential complex has a very Indian small-town look, with neat sidewalks, spacious houses, a club with tennis courts, swimming pool, a commissary etc.

In 1974 after India conducted its first nuclear weapons test, called the Smiling Buddha, the West chose to no longer honour its agreement to supply the plant with enriched uranium. Nuclear fuel for TAPS has subsequently been delivered from France, China and Russia under IAEA safeguards.

The residential colony features 3 central schools namely - Atomic Energy Central School No. 1 (AECS-1), Atomic Energy Central School No. 2 (AECS-2) and Atomic Energy Central School No. 3 (AECS-3), all running under Atomic Energy Education Society (AEES). The local beach at Chinchani is approximately 7 kilometres (4.3 mi) from the colony.

After the 2020 incident at TAPS 1, both unit 1 and 2 were offline, undergoing refurbishment and maintenance activities for life extension. The reactor safety and control systems were upgraded along with replacement of the primary recirculation system of the BWR units. Unit 1 returned to working order and was synchronised with the grid in February 2026 after achieving criticality on 30 December 2025. Unit 2 also followed unit 1 and is back online as of June 2026.

== Units ==
Phase	Unit No.	Reactor		Status	Capacity in MWe		Construction start	First criticality	Grid Connection	Commercial operation	Closure	Notes
Phase	Unit No.	Type	Model	Status	Net	Gross	Construction start	First criticality	Grid Connection	Commercial operation	Closure	Notes
I	1	BWR	BWR-1	Operational	150	160	1 October 1964	1 February 1969	1 April 1969	28 October 1969	—N/a	First commercial nuclear power reactors in India
I	2	BWR	BWR-1	Operational	150	160	1 October 1964	28 February 1969	5 May 1969	28 October 1969	—N/a	First commercial nuclear power reactors in India
II	3	PHWR	IPHWR-540	Operational	490	540	12 May 2000	21 May 2006	15 June 2006	18 August 2006	—N/a	
II	4	PHWR	IPHWR-540	Operational	490	540	8 March 2000	6 March 2005	4 June 2005	12 September 2005	—N/a	

== Incidents ==
In 1980s, the BWR units faced extreme technical issues and difficulties. This led to repeated shutdowns. Finally in 1989, the gross capacity of the units was reduced to 160 MWe from the original 210 MWe to eliminate the issues.

In 1995, a radioactive water leak was reported from the atomic power station.

In March 2018, a reported boiler explosion at Tarapur Atomic Power Station caused fires and explosions, killing three people and injuring at least 12.

During maintenance of Tarapur-1, a blast occurred which damaged the chimney. Tarapur-2 was subsequently shut down to avoid any potential issues, completely shutting down the power generation capability of Phase-1 of TAPS in January 2020.

== Current status ==
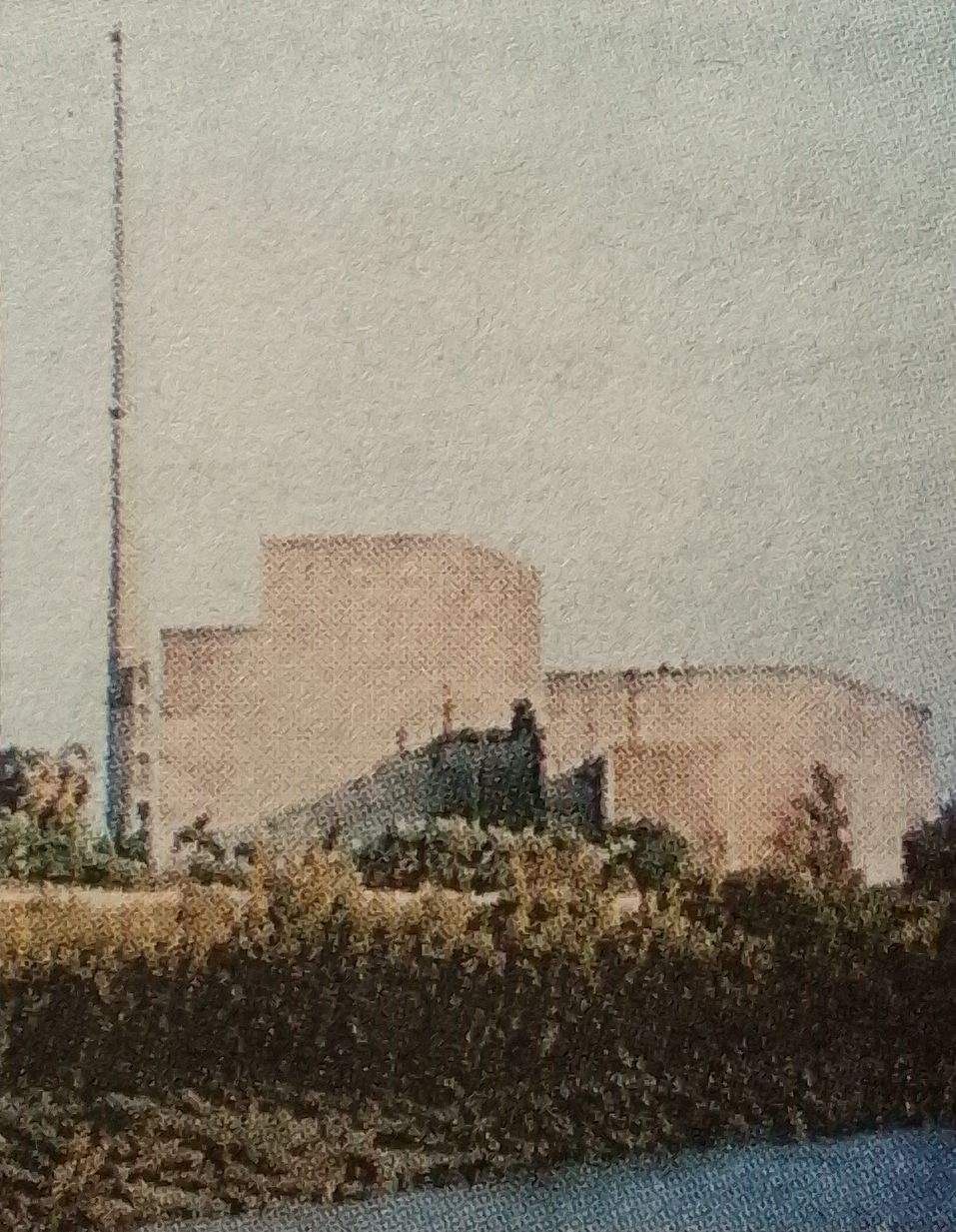
Tarapur Atomic Power Station units 1 & 2 published image in a newspaper

T.A.P.S.-1 & 2 were shut down in 2020 following the explosion at T.A.P.S.-1. Later cracks were found in the primary recirculation system in both units. Restart of the two units was planned for Nov. 2024 after replacement of the damaged parts. This will increase the operational life of the older BWR units by an additional 10 years. The parts are to be delivered from Italy says plant director Mulkalwar. As of June 2025, the reactors remained defunct. T.A.P.S.-3 & 4 are currently operational.

On 16 February 2025, the chairman of the Adani group, Gautam Adani paid a visit to the plant seeking information about its history and working along with officials from adani power and adani green. In the wake of the budget 2025, and proposed changes in the nuclear liability act, and opening the nuclear power sector for private companies, this visit has attained significance.

On 30 December 2025, Tarapur unit 1 achieved criticality after almost 6 years of life extension work.

The reactors 1 & 2 of the Tarapur Atomic Power Station have been refurbished for a 10 year extension after being shut down following an explosion while maintenance, damaging the chimney, and the discovery of cracks in the recirculation system of the BWR reactors. The system has been replaced at both, unit 1 and 2, undergoing series of upgrades in safety, replaced piping of the primary recirculation system of the BWR reactor. It attained criticality on 30 December 2025, and was briefly connected to the grid on 29 January 2026 before being disconnected again. Unit 1 was finally synchronized with the national grid in February 2026, and is operating at its rated power. Unit 2 is also back online

In February 2026, Unit 1 was successfully synchronised with the grid and is now fully operational.

On 7 May 2026, the AERB granted permission to restart Unit 2 and operate it for another 10 years. As of June 2026, both Units 1 and 2 are operational.

== Proposed reactors ==
As a part of India's 3 stage nuclear power program, the design oh the Advanced heavy water reactor 300 Prototype is planned for the site. Though no ground development has taken place, mainly due to delay in design at the Bhabha Atomic Research Centre.

The lead units of the BSMR-200, SMR-55, and the HTGR of 5 MW are being planned to be set up at Tarapur and Vizag.

== Safety concerns ==
The Boiling water reactors (GE BWR-1) at Tarapur 1 and 2 units are earlier designs of the reactors involved in the Fukushima Daiichi nuclear disaster. The Fukushima reactors are later designs: BWR-3, BWR-4, and BWR-5. The age of the reactors, coupled with their old design, have raised safety concerns and, according to one local leader in 2011, the reactors had already been in operation for 16 years longer than their design lives. The reactors' power level was reduced from 210 MW to 160 MW, allowing for an increased life span.

In 2007, Atomic Energy Regulatory Board (AERB) evaluated seismic safety features at Tarapur 1 and 2 and reported many shortfalls, following which NPCIL installed seismic sensors. In 2011, AERB formed a 10-member committee, consisting of experts from Indian Institutes of Technology (IIT) and India Meteorological Department (IMD), to assess the vulnerability of the Tarapur to earthquakes and tsunamis. A. Gopalakrishnan, former director of AERB, said that since Tarapur's reactors are much older than the Fukushima units, they should be immediately decommissioned.

But the reactors were planned for restart in November 2024 after replacement of parts in the primary recirculation system. The units are planned to operate for another ten years. The cost per KWh may increase slightly. AERB has assessed the units thoroughly and has said that they can operate up to 60 effective full power years (EFPY)s while they have operated for only around 20 EFPYs. As of June 2025, the reactors remained defunct. 30 December 2025 saw unit 1 achieve criticality after being shut down from 2020. It was briefly connected to the national grid on 29 January 2026, but was disconnected soon, when a fault was detected in the turbine.

In February 2026, Unit 1 returned to service after a six year long refurbishment, with improved safety and efficiency.

== See also ==
- Advanced Fuel Fabrication Facility
- Nuclear power in India
- List of Indian Nuclear Reactors
- Map showing nuclear plants in India
