= Gorakhpur, Haryana =

Gorakhpur
- Village
- Location in Haryana, India Gorakhpur (India)
- Coordinates: 29.4467168°N 75.6723583°E
- Country: India
- State: Haryana
- District: Fatehabad

Population (2011)
  - Total: 13,068

Languages
  - Official: Hindi, Haryanvi
- Time zone: UTC+5:30 (IST)

Gorakhpur is a village in Fatehabad district of Haryana, India. It is part of Fatehabad tehsil and 27 km (17 mi) from Fatehabad, which is both the district and tehsil headquarters.
