= Thermal-neutron reactor =

Nuclear reactor that uses moderated neutrons

A thermal-neutron reactor is a nuclear reactor that uses slow or thermal neutrons. ("Thermal" does not mean hot in an absolute sense, but means in thermal equilibrium with the medium it is interacting with, the reactor's fuel, moderator and structure, which is much lower energy than the fast neutrons initially produced by fission.)

Most nuclear power plant reactors are thermal reactors and use a neutron moderator to slow neutrons until they approach the average kinetic energy of the surrounding particles, that is, to reduce the speed of the neutrons to low-velocity, thermal neutrons. Neutrons are uncharged, this allows them to penetrate deep in the target and close to the nuclei, thus scattering neutrons by nuclear forces, some nuclides are scattered large.

The nuclear cross section of uranium-235 for slow thermal neutrons is about 1000 barns, while for fast neutrons it is in the order of 1 barn. Therefore, thermal neutrons are more likely to cause uranium-235 to nuclear fission than to be captured by uranium-238. If at least one neutron from the U-235 fission strikes another nucleus and causes it to fission, then the chain reaction will continue. If the reaction will sustain itself, it is said to be critical, and the mass of U-235 required to produce the critical condition is said to be a critical mass.

Thermal reactors consist of the following:

- Neutron moderator to slow down the neutrons. In light water reactors and heavy water reactors it doubles as the nuclear reactor coolant.
- Nuclear fuel, which is a fissile material, usually uranium.
- Reactor vessel that is a pressure vessel containing the coolant and reactor core.
- Radiation shielding to protect people and the environment from the harmful effects of ionizing radiation.
- Containment buildings which are designed to contain the escape of radiation in an emergency.
- Instrumentation to monitor and control the reactor's systems.

== Types of thermal-neutron reactor ==
=== Light-Water Reactor, LWR ===
The light-water reactor (LWR) is a type of thermal-neutron reactor that uses normal water, as opposed to , as both its coolant and ; furthermore a solid form of fissile elements is used as fuel. Thermal-neutron reactors are the most common type of , and light-water reactors are the most common type of thermal-neutron reactor.

There are three varieties of light-water reactors: the (PWR), the (BWR), and (most designs of) the (SCWR).

=== Heavy Water Reactor, HWR ===
A heavy water reactor (HWR) is a type of which uses (D_{2}O, oxide) as a . It may also use this as the coolant, in the case of s. Due to heavy water's low neutron absorption cross section, HWRs can operate with fuel.

=== Gas-Cooled Reactor, GCR ===
A gas-cooled reactor (GCR) is a that uses as a and a gas ( or in extant designs) as . Although there are many other types of reactor cooled by gas, the terms GCR and to a lesser extent gas cooled reactor are particularly used to refer to this type of reactor.

== Examples by generation ==
=== Generation I (1950s–1960s) ===
These were early prototypes and demonstration reactors.

- Shippingport Atomic Power Station (USA): The world’s first full-scale PWR.
- Magnox reactors (UK): Used natural uranium and graphite moderation.
- Obninsk Nuclear Power Plant AM-1 (USSR): The first grid-connected nuclear power plant.

=== Generation II (1970s–1990s) ===
Commercial reactors with standardized designs and improved safety.

- Pressurized Water Reactor (PWR) – e.g., Westinghouse and Framatome designs.
- Boiling Water Reactor (BWR) – e.g., GE BWR series.
- CANDU reactor – Canadian heavy water reactors using natural uranium.
- Advanced Gas-cooled Reactor (AGR) – UK graphite-moderated, CO_{2}-cooled.

All of these are thermal reactors using moderators like water or graphite.

== Generation III / III+ (1990s–present) ==
Enhanced safety, longer lifespans, and passive safety systems.

- AP1000 (USA): A Gen III+ PWR with passive cooling.
- EPR (European Pressurized Reactor): High-output PWR used in France and Finland.
- VVER-1200 (Russia): Modernized version of Soviet PWRs.
- CANDU 6 Enhanced: Updated heavy water reactor with improved safety.

== See also ==
- Thermal breeder reactor
- Enriched uranium
- Fast-neutron reactor
- Liquid fluoride thorium reactor
- India's three-stage nuclear power programme
