= Advanced heavy-water reactor =

Indian nuclear reactor design

AHWR-300
- Generation: Generation III+ reactor
- Reactor concept: Pressurised heavy-water reactor
- Designed by: Bhabha Atomic Research Centre
- Manufactured by: NPCIL (planned)
- Status: Under development

Main parameters of the reactor core
- Fuel (fissile material): ^{232}Th/^{233}U (MOX) and ^{232}Th/^{239}Pu (MOX)
- Fuel state: Solid
- Neutron energy spectrum: Thermal
- Primary control method: Control rods
- Primary moderator: Heavy water
- Primary coolant: Light water

Reactor usage
- Primary use: Generation of electricity
- Power (thermal): 920 MW_{th}
- Power (electric): 304 MW_{e}

The Advanced Heavy-Water Reactor (AHWR) or AHWR-300 is an Indian Generation III+ reactor design developed by the Bhabha Atomic Research Centre and intended to use thorium and plutonium as fuel.

The AHWR is an advanced pressurised heavy-water reactor (PHWR), that is designed to require much less mined uranium than present-generation reactors. It is slated to form the third stage in India's three-stage fuel-cycle plan. The AHWR was supposed to be built starting with a 300 MW_{e} prototype in 2016. However, as of 2026 no AHWRs have started construction.

== Background ==
The Bhabha Atomic Research Centre (BARC) has set up a large infrastructure to facilitate the design and development of PHWRs in areas including materials technologies, critical components, reactor physics, and safety analysis. Several facilities have been set up to experiment with these reactors.

Thorium is three times more abundant in the Earth's crust than uranium, though less abundant in terms of economically viable to extract proven reserves, with India holding the largest proven reserves of any country. Thorium is also contained in the tailings of mines that extract rare earth elements from monazite which usually contains both rare earth elements and thorium. As long as demand for thorium remains low, these tailings present a chemical (thorium is a toxic heavy metal) and - to a lesser extent - radiological issue which would be solved at least in part by use of thorium in nuclear power plants. Thorium lacks a fissile isotope; unlike uranium, which contains 0.72% of fissile ^{235}U, thorium is composed almost only out of fertile ^{232}Th which can be transmutated into fissile ^{233}U. Unlike ^{238}U, which is transmutable into ^{239}Pu, thorium is capable of producing large quantities of fissile material in a thermal reactor. This allows a much larger share of the original material to be used without the need for fast breeder reactors and while producing orders of magnitude less minor actinides. However, as thorium itself is not fissile, it has to be "bred" first to obtain a ^{233}U, which can then be used in the same reactor that "bred" the ^{233}U or chemically separated for use in a separate reactor. The Prototype Fast Breeder Reactor is intended to breed fissile plutonium for use with thorium.

== Design ==
The AHWR is a pressure-tube reactor moderated by heavy water and cooled by boiling light water. Its core consists of a calandria filled with heavy water, with pressure tubes containing fuel, however unlike most PHWRs the tubes are vertical rather than horizontal. The reactor core contains 452 coolant channels, of which 424 contain a fuel cluster. Each cluster contains 54 fuel pins containing a mixed oxide of ThO2 and either ^{233}U or ^{239}Pu. Each fuel element also contains an amorphous carbon moderator. The use of the heterogenous carbon and heavy-water moderator combined with the mixed oxide fuel enables the reactor to achieve a negative void coefficient. The remaining 37 channels are occupied by the shutdown system. This consists of 37 shut-off rods including 8 absorber rods, 8 shim rods, and 8 regulating rods. Each channel has a square pitch of 225 mm. The light-water primary coolant boils in the channels around the fuel.

The AHWR incorporates several features of the existing Indian PHWRs, including the pressure tube-type design, online refueling, and the availability of a large heat sink around the reactor core. It also incorporates passive safety through its boiling water coolant, which circulates via natural circulation and eliminates the need for primary coolant pumps. It also incorporates a large inventory of borated water in an overhead gravity-driven water pool to facilitate decay heat removal during a loss-of-coolant accident, as well as a passive containment cooling system.

=== Fuel cycle ===
The AHWR is planned to use a closed nuclear fuel cycle, both for reduced environmental impact and to utilise India's large thorium reserves. Recycled thorium recovered from the AHWR's spent fuel is recovered and fabricated into new fuel elements, while recycled plutonium is stored for use in a fast breeder reactor. The AHWR is also capable of using a once-through fuel cycle using low-enriched uranium (LEU). The fuel is a collection of fuel pins made up of a mix of Thorium-Uranium-233 oxide and Plutonium-Thorium oxide. It is designed to achieve high burnup using LEU and thorium. The fuel for AHWR would be manufactured by the Advanced Fuel Fabrication Facility, which is under the direction of Bhabha Atomic Research Centre (BARC) Tarapur.

== Future plans ==
The Indian Government announced in 2013 it would build an AHWR of 300 MWe with its location to be decided. As of 2017, the design was in the final stages of validation. However, as of 2025, no AHWR reactors are under construction.

== Safety features ==
The AHWR is designed to incorporate passive and inherent safety features, as part of its Defence-in-Depth strategy. Defence-in-Depth is a strategy used in reactor design, that incorporates multiple independent safety features to protect against release of radioactive materials during an accident.

The AHWR design has several inherent safety characteristics, including a negative void coefficient and natural circulation-driven decay heat removal during both normal operation and shutdown. It also features passive injection of emergency coolant and a fail-safe passive shutdown system that injects a neutron poison into the core in the case of a technical failure. It also contains a passive system to cool the containment structure in the event of a severe accident. The AHWR has features that help reduce the probability of this occurrence through its negative temperature and void coefficients, low core power density, low excess reactivity in the core, and proper selection of material attributes built in. The AHWR's gravity-driven water pool allows it to resist a long-term (100 day) station blackout condition without temperature rise.

== Technical specifications ==
| Specifications | AHWR-300 |
|---|---|
| Thermal output, MWth | 920 |
| Active power, MWe | 304 |
| Efficiency, net % | 33.1 |
| Coolant temperature, °C: | |
| core coolant inlet | 259.5 |
| core coolant outlet | 285 |
| Primary coolant material | Boiling light water |
| Secondary coolant material | Light Water |
| Moderator material | Heavy water |
| Reactor operating pressure, MPa(a) | 7 |
| Active core height, m | 3.5 |
| Equivalent core diameter, mm | - |
| Average fuel power density, MW/m^{3} | - |
| Average core power density, MW/m^{3} | 10.1 |
| Fuel | (Th, ^{233}U)MOX and (Th, ^{239}Pu)MOX |
| Cladding tube material | Zircaloy-4 |
| Fuel assemblies | 452 |
| Number of pins in assembly | 54 |
| Enrichment of reload fuel, wt % | Ring 1: (Th, ^{233}U)MOX/3.0 Ring 2: (Th, ^{233}U)MOX/3.75 Ring 3: (Th, ^{239}Pu)MOX/ 4.0 (Lower half) 2.5 (Upper half) |
| Fuel cycle length, Effective Full Power Days (EFPD) | 250 |
| Average discharge fuel burnup, MW · day / kg | 38 |
Core averaged reactivity coefficients in operating range
| Fuel temperature, Δk/k/°C | -2.1 × 10^{−5} |
| Channel temperature, Δk/k/°C | +2.5 × 10^{−5} |
| Void coefficient, Δk/k / % void | -5.0 × 10^{−5} |
| Coolant temperature, Δk/k/°C | +4.9 × 10^{−5} |
| Control rods | Boron Carbide in SS |
| Neutron absorber | Gadolinium nitrate solution |
| Residual heat removal system | Active : Condenser Passive : Isolation Condenser in Gravity Driven Water Pool |
| Safety injection system | Passive : Emergency Core Cooling System |

== See also ==
- Advanced CANDU reactor
- Breeder reactor
- Generation IV reactor
- Pressurised heavy-water reactor
- Thorium fuel cycle
- India's three-stage nuclear power programme
  - Parallel approaches
