= Kakrapar Atomic Power Station =

Indian atomic power plant

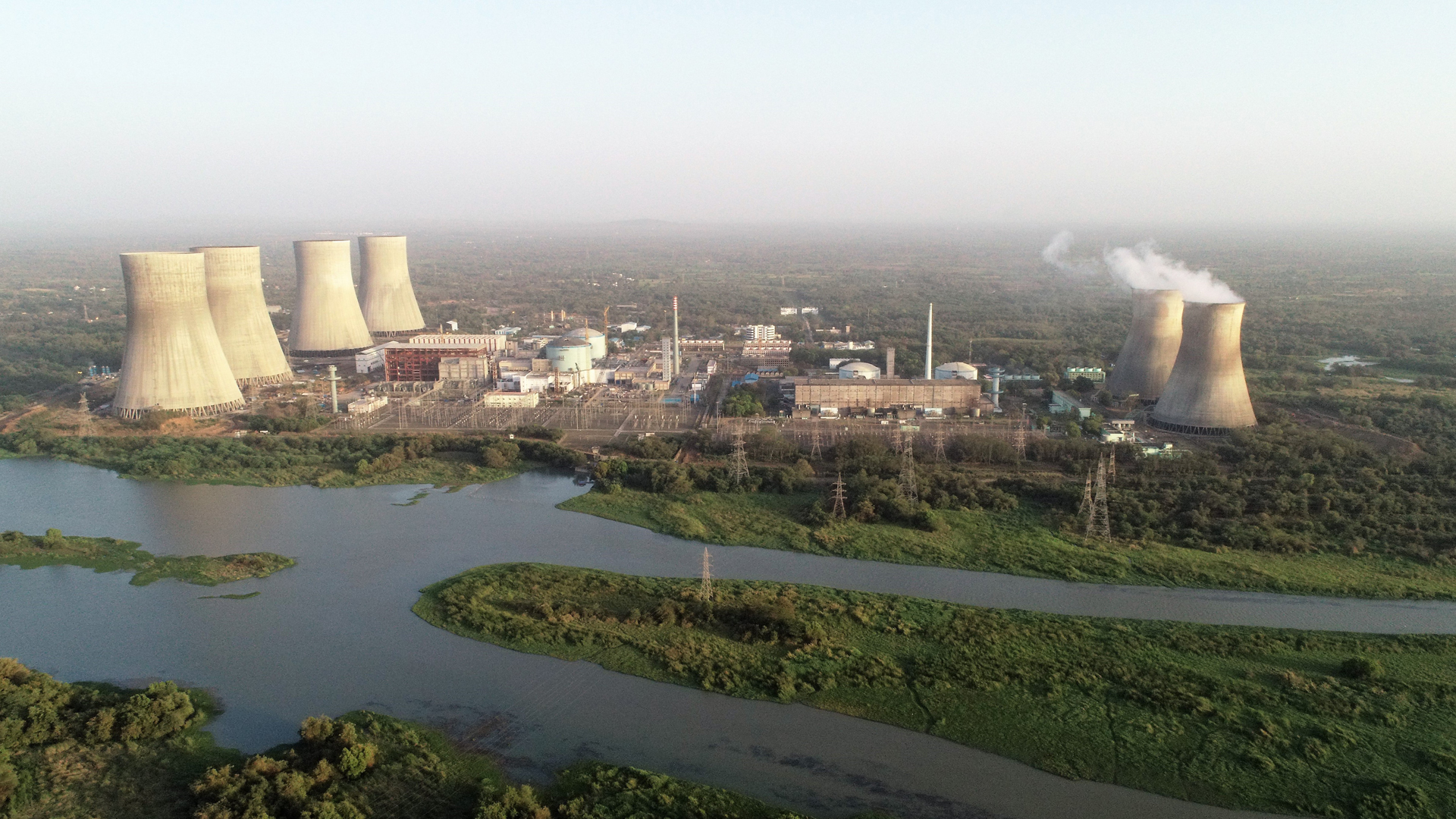
- Country: India
- Coordinates: 21°14′19″N 73°21′00″E
- Status: Operational
- Construction began: 1984
- Commission date: 6 May 1993
- Operator: Nuclear Power Corporation of India

Nuclear power station
- Reactors: 4
- Reactor type: PHWR
- Reactor supplier: NPCIL/BARC
- Cooling towers: 6 × Natural Draft
- Cooling source: Ukai Dam, Tapti River
- Thermal capacity: 2 × 754 MW_{th} 2 × 2166 MW_{th}

Power generation
- Units operational: 2 × 220 MW; 2 × 700 MW
- Make and model: Units 1 & 2: IPHWR-220; Units 3 & 4: IPHWR-700
- Nameplate capacity: 1840 MW
- Capacity factor: 91%
- Annual net output: 12302 GW·h

External links
- Website: www.npcil.nic.in/main/ProjectOperationDisplay.aspx?ReactorID=86
- Commons: Related media on Commons

Kakrapar Atomic Power Station is a nuclear power station in India, which lies in the proximity of Mandvi, Surat and Tapi river in the state of Gujarat. After commissioning units 3 and 4, the power plant has become the second largest nuclear power plant in the country after the Kudankulam Nuclear Power Plant in terms of installed capacity.

== Phase I ==
Phase I consist two 220 MW pressurised water reactor with heavy water as moderator (PHWR). KAPS-1 went critical on 3 September 1992 and began commercial electricity production a few months later on 6 May 1993. KAPS-2 went critical on 8 January 1995 and began commercial production on 1 September 1995. In January 2003, CANDU Owners Group (COG) declared KAPS as the best performing pressurised heavy water reactor.

KAPS-2 was shut down after a coolant channel leak in July 2015 and a similar issue forced the shutdown of KAPS-1 in March 2016. After a replacement of coolant channels and feeder tubes, KAPS-2 attained criticality in September 2018. Maintenance on KAPS-1 was completed ahead of schedule and was brought to operation on 19 May 2019.

The construction costs were originally estimated to be ₹382.52 crore; the plant was finally finished at a price of ₹1,335 crore.

== Phase II ==
In 2007 the First Manmohan Singh ministry approved outline plans to build two Indian-designed IPHWR-700 reactors, with two sister reactors a little later at Rajasthan Atomic Power Station. In 2009 approval was confirmed, and site preparation was completed by August 2010. The first concrete for Kakrapar 3 and 4 was in November 2010 and March 2011 respectively with operation originally expected by early and late 2018 respectively.

The project over-ran largely due to tuning of the IPHWR-700 design and slow delivery of supplies.

Unit 3 achieved the first criticality on 22 July 2020. It was connected to the grid on 10 January 2021. This unit began commercial operation on 30 June 2023. Unit 3 achieved operations at full load on 31 August 2023.

Unit 4 was commissioned after many tests. Hot functional testing was scheduled around June 2023 and criticality was initially planned around September 2023. The Initial Fuel Loading (IFL) commenced on 20 October 2023 after permission was granted by the Atomic Energy Regulatory Board. Unit 4 achieved first criticality on 17 December 2023. The reactor was connected to the grid on 20 February 2024. Unit 4 started commercial operation from 31 March, 2024.

== Units ==
Phase	Unit No.	Reactor		Status	Capacity in MWe		Construction start	First criticality	Grid Connection	Commercial operation	Closure	Notes
Phase	Unit No.	Type	Model	Status	Net	Gross	Construction start	First criticality	Grid Connection	Commercial operation	Closure	Notes
I	1	PHWR	IPHWR-220	Operational	202	220	1 December 1984	3 September 1992	24 November 1992	6 May 1993	—N/a	
I	2	PHWR	IPHWR-220	Operational	202	220	1 April 1985	8 January 1995	4 March 1995	1 September 1995	—N/a	
II	3	PHWR	IPHWR-700	Operational	630	700	22 November 2010	22 July 2020	10 January 2021	30 June 2023	—N/a	
II	4	PHWR	IPHWR-700	Operational	630	700	22 November 2010	17 December 2023	20 February 2024	31 March 2024	—N/a	
III	5	PHWR	IPHWR-700	Planned	630	700	—N/a	—N/a	—N/a	—N/a	—N/a	
III	6	PHWR	IPHWR-700	Planned	630	700	—N/a	—N/a	—N/a	—N/a	—N/a	

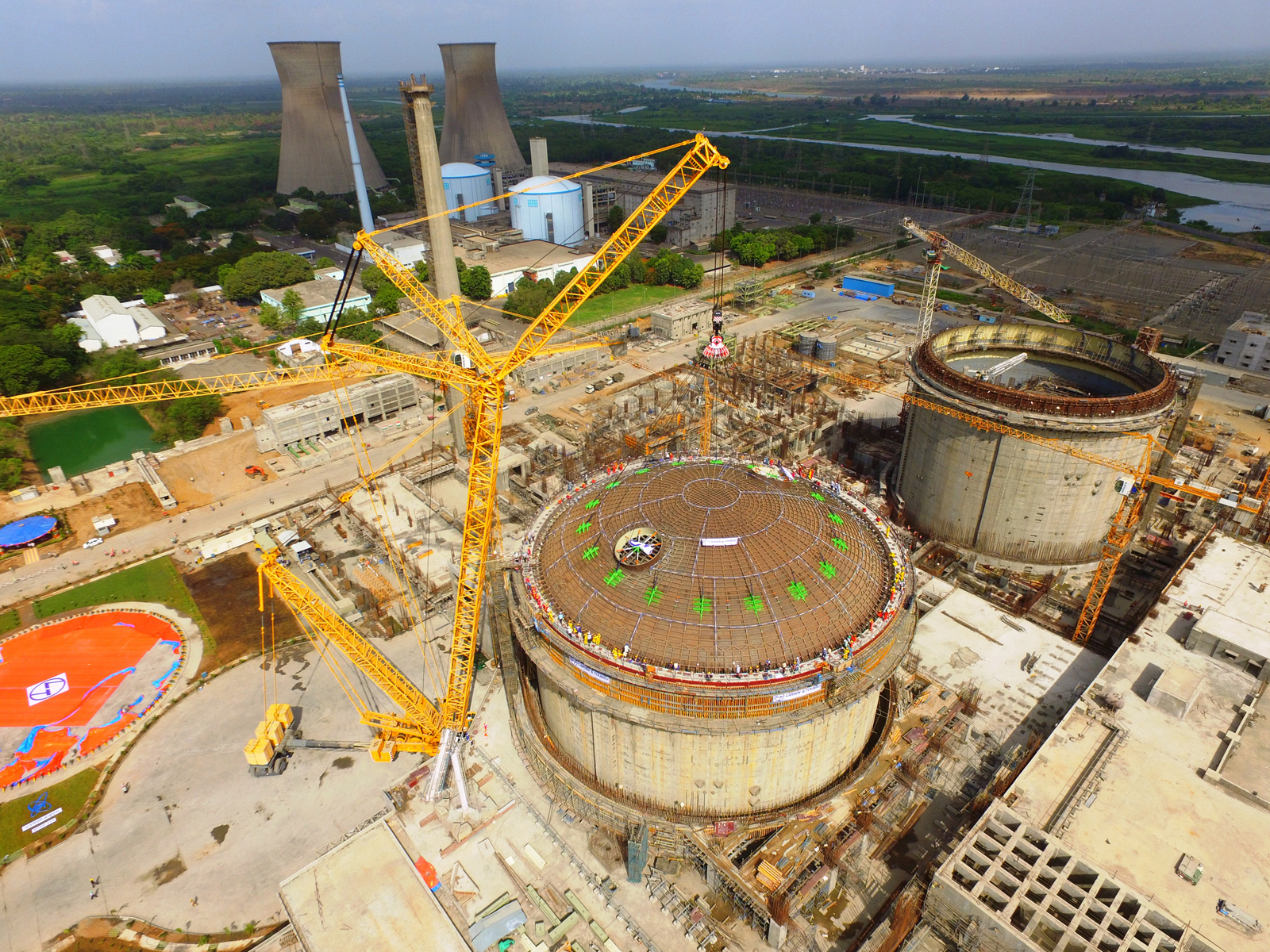
PHWR under Construction at Kakrapar Gujarat India

== Incidents ==
- 1998 KAPS-1 was switched off because of a leakage in the cooling loop for 66 days.
- 10 March 2004 the (at the time of) supply for the control rods were irreparably damaged during maintenance work. In response, poisons were added to the system and the reactor was shut off.
- On 22 August 2006 it was reported by village inhabitants the area around the power station had been penetrated. A search by the police did not result in any findings.
- On 11 March 2016, KAPS-1 automatically shut down due to a leak of heavy coolant water, leaving both reactors non-operational. The leak was plugged ten days later. Corrosion and cracks were found on the coolant channel and similar corrosion spots were found in KAPS-2 which had been non-operational since July 2015 after a coolant channel leak. KAPS-2 attained criticality on 17 September 2018 after a replacement of its coolant channels and feeder tubes. KAPS-1 became operational ahead of schedule on 19 May 2019

== See also ==
- Nuclear power in India
- List of commercial nuclear reactors#India
