= List of Padma Shri award recipients in science and engineering =

Recipients of a civilian award in India

This is a list of recipients of the Padma Shri award, the fourth-highest civilian award of the Republic of India, in the field of Science and Engineering. As of 2025, a total of 342 individuals have been awarded Padma Shri for their contributions to science and engineering.(Actually, the list contains all Padma awardees including Bharat Ratna; in fact, the very first entry, C V Raman, is for Bharat Ratna. Followed by next five Padma Bhushan and then four Padma Shri)

== 1950–1959 ==
Year	Name	State	Field
1954	Chandrasekhara Venkata Raman	Tamil Nadu	Science and Engineering
1954	Homi Jehangir Bhabha	Maharashtra	Science and Engineering
1954	Jnan Chandra Ghosh	West Bengal	Science and Engineering
1954	Kariamanikkam Srinivasa Krishnan	Tamil Nadu	Science and Engineering
1954	Shanti Swarup Bhatnagar	Uttar Pradesh	Science and Engineering
1954	Ajudhia Nath Khosla	Delhi	Science and Engineering
1954	Akhil Chandra Mitra	Uttar Pradesh	Science and Engineering
1954	kshitish Ranjan Chakravarty	West Bengal	Science and Engineering
1954	Govind Lal	Punjab	Science and Engineering
1954	Khushi Ram Sharma	Punjab	Science and Engineering
1955	Rahman Shri Habib-ur	Delhi	Science and Engineering
1956	Tiruvadi Sambasiva Venkatraman	Tamil Nadu	Science and Engineering
1956	Satish Chandra Majumdar	West Bengal	Science and Engineering
1957	Boshi Sen	West Bengal	Science and Engineering
1957	Krishnaswami Ramiah	Andhra Pradesh	Science and Engineering
1957	L. M. Chitale	Maharashtra	Science and Engineering
1957	Ram Parkash Gehlote	Delhi	Science and Engineering
1958	Darashaw Nosherwan Wadia	Maharashtra	Science and Engineering
1958	Salim Ali	Maharashtra	Science and Engineering
1958	Bal Raj Nijhawan	Jharkhand	Science and Engineering
1958	Benjamin Peary Pal	Delhi	Science and Engineering
1958	Navalpakkam Parthasarathy	Odisha	Science and Engineering
1958	Lakshminarayanapuram Ananthakrishnan Ramdas	Delhi	Science and Engineering
1959	Badri Nath Uppal	Chandigarh	Science and Engineering
1959	Homi Nusserwanji Sethna	Maharashtra	Science and Engineering
1959	Om Prakash Mathur	West Bengal	Science and Engineering
1959	Surendra Nath Kar	West Bengal	Science and Engineering

== 1960–1969 ==
Year	Name	State	Field
1960	Anil Kumar Das	West Bengal	Science and Engineering
1960	Ayyagiri Sambasiva Rao	Andhra Pradesh	Science and Engineering
1961	Verrier Elwin	United Kingdom	Science and Engineering
1961	Lakshnaswamy Aiyar Venkatakrishna Iyer	Andhra Pradesh	Science and Engineering
1961	Brahm Prakash	Punjab	Science and Engineering
1961	Mambillikalathil Govind Kumar Menon	Maharashtra	Science and Engineering
1961	Man Mohan Suri	Punjab	Science and Engineering
1962	Radha Kamal Mukerjee	Uttar Pradesh	Science and Engineering
1963	Bishan Man Singh	Uttar Pradesh	Science and Engineering
1964	Jnanendra Nath Mukherjee	West Bengal	Science and Engineering
1964	Tiruvengadu Narayanayajwa Ramachandran	Tamil Nadu	Science and Engineering
1964	Gadde Ramakoteswar Rao	Andhra Pradesh	Science and Engineering
1964	Paramananda Acharya	Odisha	Science and Engineering
1965	Jayant Vishnu Narlikar	Maharashtra	Science and Engineering
1965	Kalpathi Ramakrishna Ramanathan	Tamil Nadu	Science and Engineering
1965	Vishnu Madava Ghatage	Karnataka	Science and Engineering
1965	Mrityanjaya Vaidyanathan	Tamil Nadu	Science and Engineering
1965	Jashbhai Shankarbhai Patel	Gujarat	Science and Engineering
1966	Vikram Ambalal Sarabhai	Gujarat	Science and Engineering
1966	Satish Dhawan	Karnataka	Science and Engineering
1967	Anekal Ramaswamiengar Gopal-Ayengar	Maharashtra	Science and Engineering
1967	Guduru Venkata Chalam	Tamil Nadu	Science and Engineering
1967	Hermenogild Santapau	Spain	Science and Engineering
1967	Monkombu Sambasivan Swaminathan	Tamil Nadu	Science and Engineering
1967	Lt. Col. Lal Singh	Uttarakhand	Science and Engineering
1967	Ajit Singh	Punjab	Science and Engineering
1967	Chandi Dan	Rajasthan	Science and Engineering
1967	Harischandra Gopal Patil	Maharashtra	Science and Engineering
1967	Maganbhai Ranchhodbhai Patel	Gujarat	Science and Engineering
1967	Syed Fareeduddin	Telangana	Science and Engineering
1968	Subrahmanyan Chandrasekhar	United States of America	Science and Engineering
1968	Benjamin Peary Pal	Punjab	Science and Engineering
1968	Brahm Prakash	Punjab	Science and Engineering
1968	Calyampudi Radhakrishna Rao	Delhi	Science and Engineering
1968	Prabhu Lal Bhatnagar	Karnataka	Science and Engineering
1968	Waman Bapuji Metre	Maharashtra	Science and Engineering
1968	Govind Pandurang Kane	Maharashtra	Science and Engineering
1968	Raja Ramanna	Tamil Nadu	Science and Engineering
1968	Lakshman Dev	Uttar Pradesh	Science and Engineering
1968	Man Sinh Mahobat Sinh Rana	Delhi	Science and Engineering
1968	Sirkazhi Ramaswamy Iyer Balasubrahmanyam	Kerala	Science and Engineering
1968	Sudheer Sojwal	Haryana	Science and Engineering
1969	Hargobind Khorana	United States of America	Science and Engineering
1969	Adinath Lahiri	West Bengal	Science and Engineering
1969	Vatakke Kurupath Narayana Menon	Kerala	Science and Engineering
1969	Mohanlal Lalloobhai Dantwala	Maharashtra	Science and Engineering
1969	Amrik Singh Cheema	Punjab	Science and Engineering
1969	Nautam Bhagwanlal Bhatt	Delhi	Science and Engineering
1969	Ramakrishna Ananthakrishnan	Maharashtra	Science and Engineering
1969	Teralundur Venkatarama Mahalingam	Tamil Nadu	Science and Engineering
1969	Holenarsipuram Govindrao Srinivasa Murthy	United States of America	Science and Engineering
1969	Yogeshwar Dayal	Delhi	Science and Engineering
1969	Savitri Sahni	Uttar Pradesh	Science and Engineering

== 1970–1979 ==
Year	Name	State	Field
1970	Krishnaswami Ramiah	Tamil Nadu	Science and Engineering
1970	Maharajapuram Sitaram Krishnan	Tamil Nadu	Science and Engineering
1970	Ghulam Ahmed Bandey	Jammu and Kashmir	Science and Engineering
1970	Pisharoth Rama Pisharoty	Gujarat	Science and Engineering
1970	Ramesh Tribhuwandas Doshi	Maharashtra	Science and Engineering
1970	Shantilal Balashanker Pandya	Delhi	Science and Engineering
1971	Pandurang Vasudeva Sakhatme	Italy	Science and Engineering
1971	Satish Dhawan	Karnataka	Science and Engineering
1971	Harbhajan Singh	Delhi	Science and Engineering
1971	Moti Lal Dhar	Uttar Pradesh	Science and Engineering
1971	Sishta Venkata Seetharama Shastry	Telangana	Science and Engineering
1971	Devendra Lal	Maharashtra	Science and Engineering
1971	Tiruvadi Venkataraman Ramamurti	Delhi	Science and Engineering
1972	Vikram Ambalal Sarabhai (Posthumous)	Gujarat	Science and Engineering
1972	Bal Dattatriya Tilak	Maharashtra	Science and Engineering
1972	Monkombu Sambasiva Swaminathan	Tamil Nadu	Science and Engineering
1972	Mohinder Singh Randhawa	Punjab	Science and Engineering
1972	Dattatraya Yeshwant Phadke	Maharashtra	Science and Engineering
1972	L.A.Krishna Iyer	Kerala	Science and Engineering
1972	Ram Narayan Chakravarti	West Bengal	Science and Engineering
1972	Ayyagiri Sambasiva Rao	Andhra Pradesh	Science and Engineering
1972	M. B. Ramachandra Rao	Delhi	Science and Engineering
1972	K. Kirpal Singh	Punjab	Science and Engineering
1972	Pran Nath Mehra	Chandigarh	Science and Engineering
1972	Charles Mark Correa	Maharashtra	Science and Engineering
1972	Puran Lal Batra	Haryana	Science and Engineering
1972	Ved Prakash Agnihotri	Punjab	Science and Engineering
1973	Daulat Sinyh Kothari	Delhi	Science and Engineering
1973	Om P. Bahl	United States of America	Science and Engineering
1973	Raja Ramanna	Tamil Nadu	Science and Engineering
1973	Nedumangattu Kesava Panikkar	Tamil Nadu	Science and Engineering
1973	Govind Swarup	Karnataka	Science and Engineering
1973	Krishnan Raghavachari	Maharashtra	Science and Engineering
1973	Prabhashankar Ogadhbhai Sompura	Gujarat	Science and Engineering
1974	Arunachala Sreenivasan	Karnataka	Science and Engineering
1974	Toppur Seethapathy Sadasivan	Tamil Nadu	Science and Engineering
1974	Habibur Rahman	Delhi	Science and Engineering
1974	Chintamani Nagesh Ramachandra Rao	Uttar Pradesh	Science and Engineering
1974	Sitaram Rao Valluri	Karnataka	Science and Engineering
1974	Achyut Purshottam Kanvinde	Delhi	Science and Engineering
1974	Ram Prasad Choudhary Jaiswal	Bihar	Science and Engineering
1974	Suchitra Mitra	West Bengal	Science and Engineering
1975	Raja Ramanna	Karnataka	Science and Engineering
1975	Dilbagh Singh Athwal	United States of America	Science and Engineering
1975	Madhav Sadashiv Gore	Maharashtra	Science and Engineering
1975	Padmanabha Krishnagopala. Iyengar	Maharashtra	Science and Engineering
1975	Dr.(Smt.) Asima Chatterjee	West Bengal	Science and Engineering
1975	Anil Kumar Ganguly	West Bengal	Science and Engineering
1975	Pranab Rebatiranjan Dastidar	Maharashtra	Science and Engineering
1975	Rajagopala Chidambaram	Tamil Nadu	Science and Engineering
1975	Sekharipuram Narayana Aiyer Seshadri	Tamil Nadu	Science and Engineering
1975	Shambhu Dayal Singhal	Uttarakhand	Science and Engineering
1975	Pradip Ranjan Roy	West Bengal	Science and Engineering
1975	Sudhakar Dwarkanath Soman	Maharashtra	Science and Engineering
1976	Kalpathi Ramakrishna Ramanathan	Kerala	Science and Engineering
1976	Salim Ali	Maharashtra	Science and Engineering
1976	Udipi Ramachanda Rao	Karnataka	Science and Engineering
1976	Yash Pal	Punjab	Science and Engineering
1976	Atmaram Bhalrav Joshi	Delhi	Science and Engineering
1976	Brajendra Kisore Banerjea	West Bengal	Science and Engineering
1976	Gurbachan Singh Sidhu	Uttar Pradesh	Science and Engineering
1976	Balkrishna Vithaldas Doshi	Gujarat	Science and Engineering
1977	Mysore Narasimhachar Srinivas	Karnataka	Science and Engineering
1977	(Miss) Edavaleth Kakkat Janaki Ammal	Kerala	Science and Engineering
1977	Ramamoorthy Belagaje	United Kingdom	Science and Engineering
1977	Vishwa Gopal Jhingran	Uttarakhand	Science and Engineering
1977	Prafulla Kumar Jena	Odisha	Science and Engineering
1977	Sibte Hasan Zaidi	Uttar Pradesh	Science and Engineering
1977	Jugal Kishore Chowdhury	Delhi	Science and Engineering
1977	Mohd. Fayazuddin Nizami	Telangana	Science and Engineering

== 1980–1989 ==
Year	Name	State	Field
1981	Satish Dhawan	Karnataka	Science and Engineering
1981	Manali Kallat Vainu Bappu	Tamil Nadu	Science and Engineering
1981	Dinkar Gangadhar Kelkar	Maharashtra	Science and Engineering
1981	Gurcharn Singh Kalkat	United States of America	Science and Engineering
1981	Hari Krishan Jain	Delhi	Science and Engineering
1982	Ajit Ram Verma	Delhi	Science and Engineering
1982	Grace L.Mc Cann Morley	Delhi	Science and Engineering
1982	Krishnaswamy Kasturirangan	Karnataka	Science and Engineering
1982	Satya Prakash	Gujarat	Science and Engineering
1982	Rear Adm. Francis Leslie Fraser	Uttarakhand	Science and Engineering
1982	Ramaswamy Manica Vasagam	Kerala	Science and Engineering
1982	Vakkaleri Narayana Rao	Karnataka	Science and Engineering
1983	Arun Kumar Sharma	Delhi	Science and Engineering
1983	Hassan Nasiem Siddiquie	Goa	Science and Engineering
1983	Saroj Raj Choudhury (Posthumous)	Odisha	Science and Engineering
1984	Obaid Siddiqi	Maharashtra	Science and Engineering
1984	Malur Ramaswamy Srinivasan	Maharashtra	Science and Engineering
1984	Vasant Ranchhod Gowariker	Maharashtra	Science and Engineering
1984	Prof.(Miss) Maria Renee Cura	Argentina	Science and Engineering
1984	K. Narayanan	Gujarat	Science and Engineering
1984	Myneni Hariprasada Rao	Maharashtra	Science and Engineering
1984	Nilambar Pant	Karnataka	Science and Engineering
1984	Pramod Kale	Gujarat	Science and Engineering
1985	Chintamani Nagesa Ramachandra Rao	Tamil Nadu	Science and Engineering
1985	Bernard Peters	Denmark	Science and Engineering
1985	Bhalchandra Madhav Udgaonkar	Maharashtra	Science and Engineering
1985	Eknath Vasant Chitnis	Gujarat	Science and Engineering
1985	Sivaraj Ramaseshan	Karnataka	Science and Engineering
1985	Virender Lal Chopra	Delhi	Science and Engineering
1985	Dinamani Shridhar Kamat	Uttarakhand	Science and Engineering
1985	Predhiman Krishan Kaw	Gujarat	Science and Engineering
1986	S. Dillon Ripley	United States of America	Science and Engineering
1986	Chokkanathapuram Venkataraman Sundaram	Tamil Nadu	Science and Engineering
1987	Benjamin Peary Pal	Delhi	Science and Engineering
1987	Manmohan Sharma	Maharashtra	Science and Engineering
1987	Roddam Narasimha	Karnataka	Science and Engineering
1987	Ramadas Panemangalore Shenoy	Karnataka	Science and Engineering
1987	Paranandi Venkata Suryanarayana Rao	Maharashtra	Science and Engineering
1988	Ashok Sekhar Ganguly	Maharashtra	Science and Engineering
1988	Badanaval Venkata Sreekantan	Maharashtra	Science and Engineering
1988	Ram Prakash Bambah	Chandigarh	Science and Engineering
1988	Ramanatha Venkata Ramani	Tamil Nadu	Science and Engineering
1989	Mankombu Sambasivan Swaminathan	Delhi	Science and Engineering
1989	Ashes Prosad Mitra	Delhi	Science and Engineering
1989	Narinder Singh Randhawa	Delhi	Science and Engineering
1989	Palle Rama Rao	Telangana	Science and Engineering
1989	Saroj Ghose	West Bengal	Science and Engineering

== 1990–1999 ==
Year	Name	State	Field
1990	Avul Pakir Jainulabdeen Abdul Kalam	Telangana	Science and Engineering
1990	Vallampadugai Srinivasa Raghavan Arunchalam	Delhi	Science and Engineering
1990	Laxmangudi Krishnamurthy Doraiswamy	United States of America	Science and Engineering
1990	Malur Ramaswamy Srinivasan	Maharashtra	Science and Engineering
1990	Bimal Kumar Bachhawat	Delhi	Science and Engineering
1990	Prof.(Dr.) Mudumbai Seshachalu Narasimhan	Maharashtra	Science and Engineering
1990	Dinkarrao Govindrao alias Appasaheb Pawar	Maharashtra	Science and Engineering
1990	Jatish Chandra Bhattacharyya	Telangana	Science and Engineering
1990	Laurence Wilfred Baker	Kerala	Science and Engineering
1990	Madhavan Pillai Ramakrishna Kurup	Kerala	Science and Engineering
1990	Ram Narain Agarwal	Telangana	Science and Engineering
1991	Leslie Denis Swindale	New Zealand	Science and Engineering
1991	Alla Venkata Rama Rao	Telangana	Science and Engineering
1991	Bangalore Puttaiya Radhakrishna	Karnataka	Science and Engineering
1991	Genesan Venkataraman	Andhra Pradesh	Science and Engineering
1991	Raghunath Anant Mashelkar	Maharashtra	Science and Engineering
1991	Bulusu Lakshamana Deekshatulu	Telangana	Science and Engineering
1991	Govindarajan Padmanaban	Karnataka	Science and Engineering
1991	Narinder Kumar Gupta	Delhi	Science and Engineering
1991	Shri Krishna Joshi	Delhi	Science and Engineering
1991	Rakesh Bakshi	Delhi	Science and Engineering
1992	Khem Singh Gill	Punjab	Science and Engineering
1992	Krishnaswamy Kasturirangan	Karnataka	Science and Engineering
1992	Triloki Nath Khoshoo	Delhi	Science and Engineering
1992	Ranjan Roy Daniel	Tamil Nadu	Science and Engineering
1992	Vinod Prakash Sharma	Delhi	Science and Engineering
1992	Zal Sohrab Tarapore	Maharashtra	Science and Engineering
1992	Gjanardhana Puranik Narayana Rao	Bhutan	Science and Engineering
1992	Joseph Allen Stein	Delhi	Science and Engineering
1992	Madhava Ashish	Uttarakhand	Science and Engineering
1997	Avul Pakir Jainulabdeen Abdul Kalam	Delhi	Science and Engineering
1998	Rajendra Singh Paroda	Delhi	Science and Engineering
1998	Sivaramakrishna Chandrasekhar	Karnataka	Science and Engineering
1998	Vaidyeswaran Rajaraman	Karnataka	Science and Engineering
1998	G. Madhavan Nair	Kerala	Science and Engineering
1998	Manmohan Attavar	Karnataka	Science and Engineering
1998	Aditya Narain Purohit	Uttarakhand	Science and Engineering
1998	Prof.(Smt) Priyambada Mohanty Hejmadi	Odisha	Science and Engineering
1998	Anil Kakodkar	Maharashtra	Science and Engineering
1998	Pradhan Shambu Saran	Delhi	Science and Engineering
1998	Vijay Kumar Saraswat	Telangana	Science and Engineering
1999	Rajagopala Chidambaram	Maharashtra	Science and Engineering
1999	Verghese Kurien	Gujarat	Science and Engineering
1999	George Joseph	Gujarat	Science and Engineering
1999	Anil Kakodkar	Maharashtra	Science and Engineering
1999	Krishnamurthy Santhanam	Delhi	Science and Engineering
1999	Mangina Venkateswara Rao	Telangana	Science and Engineering
1999	Satinder Kumar Sikka	Maharashtra	Science and Engineering
1999	Mallasamudram Subramanyam Ramakumar	Maharashtra	Science and Engineering
1999	Virendra Singh Sethi	Chandigarh	Science and Engineering

== 2000–2009 ==
Year	Name	State	Field
2000	Krishnaswamy Kasturirangan	Karnataka	Science and Engineering
2000	Raghunath Anant Mashelkar	Delhi	Science and Engineering
2000	Vasudev Kalkunte Aatre	Delhi	Science and Engineering
2000	Late Dr. Suryanarayana Srinivasan (Posthumous)	Kerala	Science and Engineering
2000	Braj Basi Lal	Delhi	Science and Engineering
2000	Pavagada Venkata Indiresan	Delhi	Science and Engineering
2000	Prof.(Dr.) Pakkiriswamy Chandra Sekharan	Karnataka	Science and Engineering
2000	Ram Narain Agarwal	Telangana	Science and Engineering
2000	Dilip Devidas Bhawalkar	Madhya Pradesh	Science and Engineering
2000	Gurdev Singh Khush	Philippines	Science and Engineering
2000	Parasu Ram Mishra	Jharkhand	Science and Engineering
2000	Vijay Pandurang Bhatkar	Maharashtra	Science and Engineering
2000	Gopalasamy Govindarajan	Maharashtra	Science and Engineering
2001	Calyampudi Radhakrishna Rao	United States of America	Science and Engineering
2001	Man Mohan Sharma	Maharashtra	Science and Engineering
2001	Arun Netravali	United States of America	Science and Engineering
2001	Palle Rama Rao	Telangana	Science and Engineering
2001	Raj Reddy	United States of America	Science and Engineering
2001	(Ms.) Ketayun Ardeshir Dinshaw	Maharashtra	Science and Engineering
2001	Chandrathil Gouri Krishnadas Nair	Karnataka	Science and Engineering
2001	Dasika Durga Prasada Rao	Telangana	Science and Engineering
2001	Madabusi Santanam Raghunathan	Maharashtra	Science and Engineering
2001	Paul Ratnasamy	Maharashtra	Science and Engineering
2001	Prem Shanker Goel	Karnataka	Science and Engineering
2001	Sandip Kumar Basu	Delhi	Science and Engineering
2001	Sanjaya Rajaram	Mexico	Science and Engineering
2001	Thirumalachari Ramasami	Tamil Nadu	Science and Engineering
2001	Ashoke Sen	Uttar Pradesh	Science and Engineering
2001	Bikash Chandra Sinha	West Bengal	Science and Engineering
2001	Goverdhan Mehta	Karnataka	Science and Engineering
2001	Mohammad Shafi	Uttar Pradesh	Science and Engineering
2001	Suhas Pandurang Sukhatme	Maharashtra	Science and Engineering
2001	Tiruppattur Venkatachalamurti Ramakrishnan	Karnataka	Science and Engineering
2001	Bisweswar Bhattacharjee	Maharashtra	Science and Engineering
2001	Vijay Kumar Chaturvedi	Maharashtra	Science and Engineering
2002	Vangalampalayam Chellappagounder Kulandaiswamy	Tamil Nadu	Science and Engineering
2002	Faquir Chand Kohli	Maharashtra	Science and Engineering
2002	Guri Ivanovich Marchuk	Russia	Science and Engineering
2002	Ramanujam Varatharaja Perumal	Kerala	Science and Engineering
2002	Anand Swarup Arya	Uttarakhand	Science and Engineering
2002	Apathukatha Sivathanu Pillai	Delhi	Science and Engineering
2002	Ashok Jhunjhunwala	Tamil Nadu	Science and Engineering
2002	Byrana Nagappa Suresh	Kerala	Science and Engineering
2002	Chaitanyamoy Ganguly	Telangana	Science and Engineering
2002	Idupuganti Venkata Subba Rao	Telangana	Science and Engineering
2002	Kota Harinarayana	Karnataka	Science and Engineering
2002	Amitav Mallik	Delhi	Science and Engineering
2002	Dorairajan Balasubramanian	Telangana	Science and Engineering
2002	Narayanaswamy Balakrishnan	Karnataka	Science and Engineering
2002	Padmanabhan Balaram	Karnataka	Science and Engineering
2002	Ramanath Cowsik	Karnataka	Science and Engineering
2002	Hirebettu Sadananda Kamath	Maharashtra	Science and Engineering
2002	Katuru Narayana	Andhra Pradesh	Science and Engineering
2002	Virendra Kumar Sharma	Maharashtra	Science and Engineering
2003	Arcot Ramachandran	Karnataka	Science and Engineering
2003	Herbert Alexandrovich Yefremov	Russia	Science and Engineering
2003	Bagicha Singh Minhas	Delhi	Science and Engineering
2003	Rajinder Kumar	Karnataka	Science and Engineering
2003	Ram Badan Singh	Delhi	Science and Engineering
2003	Shri Krishna Joshi	Haryana	Science and Engineering
2003	Narayanan Srinivasan	Tamil Nadu	Science and Engineering
2003	Gyan Chandra Mishra	Maharashtra	Science and Engineering
2003	Jai Bhagwan Chowdhury	Haryana	Science and Engineering
2003	Jai Pal Mittal	Maharashtra	Science and Engineering
2003	Sarvagya Singh Katiyar	Uttar Pradesh	Science and Engineering
2003	Baburao Govindrao Shirke	Maharashtra	Science and Engineering
2003	Asok Kumar Barua	West Bengal	Science and Engineering
2003	Gopal Chandra Mitra	Odisha	Science and Engineering
2003	Mahendra Singh Sodha	Uttar Pradesh	Science and Engineering
2003	Manthiram Natarajan	Delhi	Science and Engineering
2003	Nagarajan Vedachalam	Kerala	Science and Engineering
2003	Shivram Baburao Bhoje	Tamil Nadu	Science and Engineering
2003	Sundaram Ramakrishnan	Kerala	Science and Engineering
2003	Vadiraj Raghavendra Katti	Karnataka	Science and Engineering
2004	Jayant Vishnu Narlikar	Maharashtra	Science and Engineering
2004	Govindarajan Padmanaban	Karnataka	Science and Engineering
2004	Sardara Singh Johl	Punjab	Science and Engineering
2004	Kudli Nanjunda Ghanapathi Shankara	Gujarat	Science and Engineering
2004	Lalji Singh	Telangana	Science and Engineering
2004	Tumkur Seetharamiah Prahlad	Karnataka	Science and Engineering
2004	Vishweshwaraiah Prakash	Karnataka	Science and Engineering
2004	Mamannamana Vijayan	Karnataka	Science and Engineering
2004	Rajpal Singh Sirohi	Delhi	Science and Engineering
2004	Nalini Ranjan Mohanty	Karnataka	Science and Engineering
2004	Nampally Divakar	Telangana	Science and Engineering
2004	Satish Kumar Kaura	Delhi	Science and Engineering
2005	Narasimhiah Seshagiri	Karnataka	Science and Engineering
2005	Dr.(Smt.) Kiran Mazumdar Shaw	Karnataka	Science and Engineering
2005	Valangiman Subramanian Ramamurthy	Delhi	Science and Engineering
2005	Koduru Iswara Varaprasad Reddy	Telangana	Science and Engineering
2005	Dipankar Banerjee	Delhi	Science and Engineering
2005	Srikumar Banerjee	Maharashtra	Science and Engineering
2005	Bhagavatula Dattaguru	Karnataka	Science and Engineering
2005	Madappa Mahadevappa	Karnataka	Science and Engineering
2005	Madhu Sudan Kanungo	Uttar Pradesh	Science and Engineering
2005	Banwari Lal Chouksey	Madhya Pradesh	Science and Engineering
2005	K.C. Reddy	Karnataka	Science and Engineering
2005	Sushil Sahai	Uttar Pradesh	Science and Engineering
2005	Vasudevan Gnana Gandhi	Kerala	Science and Engineering
2006	Norman E. Borlaug	Mexico	Science and Engineering
2006	Obaid Siddiqi	Karnataka	Science and Engineering
2006	Charles Correa	Maharashtra	Science and Engineering
2006	Madhav Gadgil	Maharashtra	Science and Engineering
2006	Kunnath Puthiyaveetil Padmanabhan Nambiar	Karnataka	Science and Engineering
2006	Nandan Mohan Nilekani	Karnataka	Science and Engineering
2006	S. Sivaram	Maharashtra	Science and Engineering
2006	(Dr.) Harsh Kumar Gupta	Telangana	Science and Engineering
2006	Narendra Kumar	Karnataka	Science and Engineering
2006	Ramachandran Balasubramanian	Tamil Nadu	Science and Engineering
2006	Seyed E. Hasnain	Telangana	Science and Engineering
2006	Banbehari Vishnu Nimbkar	Maharashtra	Science and Engineering
2007	Ennackal Chandy George Sudarshan	United States of America	Science and Engineering
2007	(Smt.) Manju Sharma	Delhi	Science and Engineering
2007	Gurcharan Singh Kalkat	Chandigarh	Science and Engineering
2007	Saroj Ghose	West Bengal	Science and Engineering
2007	Vilayanur Subramanian Ramachandran	United States of America	Science and Engineering
2007	Baldev Raj	Tamil Nadu	Science and Engineering
2007	Rabi Narayan Bastia	Maharashtra	Science and Engineering
2007	Thekkethil Kochandy Alex	Karnataka	Science and Engineering
2007	(Dr.) Khadg Singh Valdiya	Karnataka	Science and Engineering
2007	Ananda Mohan Chakrabarty	United States of America	Science and Engineering
2007	Dilip Biswas	Delhi	Science and Engineering
2007	Sudhir Kumar Sopory	Haryana	Science and Engineering
2007	Thanu Padmanabhan	Maharashtra	Science and Engineering
2007	Kiran Sharadchandra Karnik	Delhi	Science and Engineering
2008	E. Sreedharan	Delhi	Science and Engineering
2008	Rajendra Kumar Pachauri	Delhi	Science and Engineering
2008	Vasant Ranchhod Gowariker	Maharashtra	Science and Engineering
2008	(Dr.) Sukh Dev	Delhi	Science and Engineering
2008	Asis Datta	Delhi	Science and Engineering
2008	Sant Singh Virmani	United States of America	Science and Engineering
2008	(Dr.) Kasturi Lal Chopra	Delhi	Science and Engineering
2008	Joseph H. Hulse	Canada	Science and Engineering
2008	Bhavarlal Hiralal Jain	Maharashtra	Science and Engineering
2009	Anil Kakodkar	Maharashtra	Science and Engineering
2009	G. Madhavan Nair	Karnataka	Science and Engineering
2009	Bhakta Bhushan Rath	United States of America	Science and Engineering
2009	G.S. Randhawa	Delhi	Science and Engineering
2009	Conjeeveram Srirangachari Seshadri	Tamil Nadu	Science and Engineering
2009	(Dr.) Sarvagya Singh Katiyar	Uttar Pradesh	Science and Engineering
2009	Thomas Kailath	United States of America	Science and Engineering
2009	Satyan Pitroda	Delhi	Science and Engineering
2009	Pramod Tandon	Meghalaya	Science and Engineering
2009	Goriparthi Narasimha Raju Yadav	Andhra Pradesh	Science and Engineering

== 2010–2019 ==
Year	Name	State	Field
2010	Venkatraman Ramakrishnan	United Kingdom	Science and Engineering
2010	Arogyaswami Joseph Paulraj	United States of America	Science and Engineering
2010	Bikash Sinha	West Bengal	Science and Engineering
2010	Jagdish Chandra Kapur	Delhi	Science and Engineering
2010	Vijay Prasad Dimri	Telangana	Science and Engineering
2010	(Dr.) Palpu Pushpangadan	Kerala	Science and Engineering
2010	M.R. Satyanarayana Rao	Karnataka	Science and Engineering
2010	Ponisseril Somasundaran	United States of America	Science and Engineering
2010	Pucadyil Ittoop John	Gujarat	Science and Engineering
2010	Vijayalakshmi Ravindranath	Karnataka	Science and Engineering
2011	Palle Rama Rao	Telangana	Science and Engineering
2011	S. Ramachandran	Tamil Nadu	Science and Engineering
2011	M. H. Mehta	Gujarat	Science and Engineering
2011	Mani Bhaumik	United States of America	Science and Engineering
2011	Subra Suresh	United States of America	Science and Engineering
2011	Suman Sahai	Delhi	Science and Engineering
2011	E. A. Siddiq	Telangana	Science and Engineering
2011	M. Annamalai	Karnataka	Science and Engineering
2011	C. N. Raghavendran	Tamil Nadu	Science and Engineering
2011	Gopalan Nair Shankar	Kerala	Science and Engineering
2012	Madabusi Santanam Raghunathan	Maharashtra	Science and Engineering
2012	Shashikumar Madhusudan Chitre	Maharashtra	Science and Engineering
2012	Adimurthy Vipparthi	Kerala	Science and Engineering
2012	Krishan Lal Chadha	Delhi	Science and Engineering
2012	Lokesh Kumar Singhal	Haryana	Science and Engineering
2012	Vijaipal Singh	Uttar Pradesh	Science and Engineering
2012	Jagadish Shukla	United States of America	Science and Engineering
2012	Rameshwar Nath Koul Bamezai	Jammu and Kashmir	Science and Engineering
2012	Virander Singh Chauhan	Delhi	Science and Engineering
2012	Yagnaswamy Sundara Rajan	Karnataka	Science and Engineering
2013	Roddam Narasimha	Karnataka	Science and Engineering
2013	Yash Pal	Uttar Pradesh	Science and Engineering
2013	Apathukatha Sivathanu Pillai	Delhi	Science and Engineering
2013	Byrana Nagappa Suresh	Karnataka	Science and Engineering
2013	Vijay Kumar Saraswat	Delhi	Science and Engineering
2013	Ashoke Sen	Uttar Pradesh	Science and Engineering
2013	Jogesh Chandra Pati	United States of America	Science and Engineering
2013	Satya Nadham Atluri	United States of America	Science and Engineering
2013	Deepak Bhaskar Phatak	Maharashtra	Science and Engineering
2013	J. Gowrishankar	Telangana	Science and Engineering
2013	Mudundi Ramakrishna Raju	Andhra Pradesh	Science and Engineering
2013	Ajay Kumar Sood	Karnataka	Science and Engineering
2013	Krishnaswamy Vijayraghavan	Delhi	Science and Engineering
2013	Manindra Agrawal	Uttar Pradesh	Science and Engineering
2013	Mustansir Barma	Maharashtra	Science and Engineering
2013	Sanjay Govind Dhande	Maharashtra	Science and Engineering
2013	Sankar Kumar Pal	West Bengal	Science and Engineering
2013	Sharad Pandurang Kale	Maharashtra	Science and Engineering
2013	Avinash Chander	Delhi	Science and Engineering
2014	Chintamani Nagesa Ramachandra Rao	Karnataka	Science and Engineering
2014	Raghunath Anant Mashelkar	Maharashtra	Science and Engineering
2014	Anumolu Ramakrishna (Posthumous)	Tamil Nadu	Science and Engineering
2014	Koppillil Radhakrishnan	Karnataka	Science and Engineering
2014	Madappa Mahadevappa	Karnataka	Science and Engineering
2014	Thirumalachari Ramasami	Delhi	Science and Engineering
2014	Vinod Prakash Sharma	Delhi	Science and Engineering
2014	Jyeshtharaj Bhalchandra Joshi	Maharashtra	Science and Engineering
2014	P. Balaram	Karnataka	Science and Engineering
2014	Ajay Parida	Tamil Nadu	Science and Engineering
2014	Brahma Singh	Delhi	Science and Engineering
2014	Govindan Sundararajan	Telangana	Science and Engineering
2014	Malapaka Yejneswara Satyanarayana Prasad	Andhra Pradesh	Science and Engineering
2014	Eluvathingal Devassy Jemmis	Karnataka	Science and Engineering
2014	Jayanta Kumar Ghosh	West Bengal	Science and Engineering
2014	Ramakrishna Vijayacharya Hosur	Maharashtra	Science and Engineering
2014	Ramaswamy R. Iyer	Delhi	Science and Engineering
2014	Vinod Kumar Singh	Madhya Pradesh	Science and Engineering
2014	Alur Seelin Kiran Kumar	Gujarat	Science and Engineering
2014	M. Chandradathan	Kerala	Science and Engineering
2014	Ravi Bhushan Grover	Maharashtra	Science and Engineering
2014	Sekhar Basu	Maharashtra	Science and Engineering
2015	Prof.i Malur Ramaswamy Srinivasan	Tamil Nadu	Science and Engineering
2015	Vijay Bhatkar	Maharashtra	Science and Engineering
2015	Khadg Singh Valdiya	Karnataka	Science and Engineering
2015	Manjul Bhargava	United States of America	Science and Engineering
2015	N. Prabhakar	Delhi	Science and Engineering
2015	Prahlada	Karnataka	Science and Engineering
2015	S.K. Shivakumar	Karnataka	Science and Engineering
2015	Jacques Blamont	France	Science and Engineering
2015	S. Arunan	Karnataka	Science and Engineering
2015	Vasanth Sastri	Karnataka	Science and Engineering
2016	Vasudev Kalkunte Aatre	Karnataka	Science and Engineering
2016	Alla Venkata Rama Rao	Telangana	Science and Engineering
2016	Mylswamy Annadurai	Karnataka	Science and Engineering
2016	Satish Kumar	Delhi	Science and Engineering
2016	Dipankar Chatterji	Karnataka	Science and Engineering
2016	Onkar Nath Srivastava	Uttar Pradesh	Science and Engineering
2016	Prof.(Dr.) Ganapati Dadasaheb Yadav	Maharashtra	Science and Engineering
2016	(Prof.) Veena Tandon	Uttar Pradesh	Science and Engineering
2017	Udipi Ramachandra Rao	Karnataka	Science and Engineering
2017	Ajoy Kumar Ray	West Bengal	Science and Engineering
2017	Chandrakant Pithawa	Telangana	Science and Engineering
2017	Jitendra Nath Goswami	Gujarat	Science and Engineering
2017	Chintakindi Mallesham	Telangana	Science and Engineering
2018	Amitava Roy	West Bengal	Science and Engineering
2018	Vikram Chandra Thakur	Uttarakhand	Science and Engineering
2018	Rajagopalan Vasudevan	Tamil Nadu	Science and Engineering
2018	Manas Bihari Verma	Bihar	Science and Engineering
2019	Sankaralingam Nambi Narayanan	Kerala	Science and Engineering
2019	Uddhab Kumar Bharali	Assam	Science and Engineering
2019	Baldev Singh Dhillon	Punjab	Science and Engineering
2019	Rohini Madhusudan Godbole	Karnataka	Science and Engineering
2019	Subhash Kak	United States of America	Science and Engineering

== 2020–2029 ==
Year	Name	State	Field
2020	Raman Gangakhedkar	Maharashtra	Science and Engineering
2020	Sujoy Kumar Guha	Bihar	Science and Engineering
2020	Sudhir Jain	Gujarat	Science and Engineering
2020	Naveen Khanna	Delhi	Science and Engineering
2020	Kattungal Subramaniam Manilal	Kerala	Science and Engineering
2020	Vashishtha Narayan Singh (Posthumous)	Bihar	Science and Engineering
2020	T. Pradeep	Tamil Nadu	Science and Engineering
2020	Harish Chandra Verma	Uttar Pradesh	Science and Engineering
2021	Narinder Singh Kapany (Posthumous)	United States of America	Science and Engineering
2021	Rattan Lal	United States of America	Science and Engineering
2022	Sanjaya Rajaram (Posthumous)	Mexico	Science and Engineering
2022	Subbanna Ayyappan	Karnataka	Science and Engineering
2022	Sanghamitra Bandyopadhyay	West Bengal	Science and Engineering
2022	Aditya Prasad Dash	Odisha	Science and Engineering
2022	Motilal Madan	Haryana	Science and Engineering
2022	Anil K. Rajvanshi	Maharashtra	Science and Engineering
2022	Ajay Kumar Sonkar	Uttar Pradesh	Science and Engineering
2022	Jyantkumar Maganlal Vyas	Gujarat	Science and Engineering
2023	S. R. Srinivasa Varadhan	United States of America	Science and Engineering
2023	Deepak Dhar	Maharashtra	Science and Engineering
2023	Khadar Valli Dudekula	Karnataka	Science and Engineering
2023	Modadugu Vijay Gupta	Telangana	Science and Engineering
2023	Nagappa Ganesh Krishnarajanagar	Andhra Pradesh	Science and Engineering
2023	Arvind Kumar	Uttar Pradesh	Science and Engineering
2023	Mahendra Pal	Gujarat	Science and Engineering
2023	Bakshi Ram	Haryana	Science and Engineering
2023	Sujatha Ramdorai	Karnataka	Science and Engineering
2023	Abbareddy Nageswara Rao	Andhra Pradesh	Science and Engineering
2024	Narayan Chakrabarty	West Bengal	Science and Engineering
2024	Ram Chet Chaudhary	Uttar Pradesh	Science and Engineering
2024	Shailesh Nayak	Gujarat	Science and Engineering
2024	Hari Om	Haryana	Science and Engineering
2024	Eklabya Sharma	West Bengal	Science and Engineering
2024	Ram Chander Sihag	Haryana	Science and Engineering
2024	Ravi Prakash Singh	Mexico	Science and Engineering
2025	Vinod Dham	United States of America	Science and Engineering
2025	Ajay V Bhatt	United States of America	Science and Engineering
2025	Ashutosh Sharma	Uttar Pradesh	Science and Engineering
2025	Chetan E Chitnis	France	Science and Engineering
2025	M D Srinivas	Tamil Nadu	Science and Engineering
2025	Sethuraman Panchanathan	United States of America	Science and Engineering
2025	Surinder Kumar Vasal	Delhi	Science and Engineering
2026	Shubha Venkatesha Iyengar	Kamataka	Science and Englineering
