= Sandip =

Sandip is a given name. Notable people with the name include:

- Sandip Banerjee (born 1983), Indian first-class cricketer
- Sandip Basu, Indian physician of Nuclear Medicine, Head of Nuclear Medicine Academic Program at the Bhabha Atomic Research Centre
- Sandip Kumar Basu (born 1944), Indian molecular biologist and the holder of the J. C. Bose Chair of the National Academy of Sciences, India
- Sandip Bhattacharjee (born 1980), Indian classical singer belonging to the Kirana gharana style of singing
- Sandip Burman, tabla player from West Bengal, India
- Sandip Chakrabarti, Indian astrophysicist
- Sandip Chakravarty, tabla player, musician, DJ and TV presenter (stage name Sandyman)
- Sandip Das, Indian corporate executive in the telecom business
- Sandip Gupta (born 1967), former Kenyan cricketer
- Sandip Mandi (born 2002), Indian professional footballer
- Sandip Maniar (born 1977), Indian cricketer
- Sandip Nandy (born 1975), former Indian professional footballer
- Sandip Rai, former defender playing for Three Star Club in Martyr's Memorial A-Division League
- Sandip Ray (born 1953), Indian film director and music director who mainly works in Bengali cinema
- Sandip Roy (cricketer) (born 1989), Bangladeshi cricketer
- Sandip Sen (born 1966), Indian business executive
- Sandip Soparrkar (born 1964), Indian Latin and ballroom dancer, Bollywood choreographer, actor
- Sandip Ssingh, Indian film maker
- Sandip Trivedi (born 1963), Indian theoretical physicist working at TIFR, Mumbai, India
- Sandip Verma, Baroness Verma (born 1959), Indian-British politician in the United Kingdom

== See also ==
- Sandeep, an alternative spelling of Sandip
  - Sandeep (given name)
- Sandip University, Nashik, private university and UGC recognised, located in Nashik, Maharashtra, India
- Sandip University, Sijoul, private university located in Sijoul, Madhubani district, Bihar, India
- Saandip
- Sandwip
- Sawndip
