= Sandip University =

Sandip University may refer to one of two universities in India:

- Sandip University, Nashik
- Sandip University, Sijoul
