= Sandeep (given name) =

Sandeep (Devanagari: सन्दीप् or संदीप् Sandīp, Saṃdīp) is a common Indian given name, primarily male. The name may be derived either from the Sanskrit saṃdīpa, referring to a burning flame or lamp, or from the name of Sandipani (Sandīpanī Muni), the guru of Krishna. Other spelling variations include Sandip and Sundeep.

== Notable persons ==
- Sandeep Acharya, Indian singer
- Sandeep Baswana (born 1973), Indian television actor
- Sandeep Bavanaka, Indian first-class cricketer
- Sandeep Bakhshi, Indian banker
- Sandeep Chakravorty, Indian ambassador
- Sandeep Chowta, Indian music director
- Sandeep Das, Indian tabla player and composer
- Sandeep Dikshit, Indian politician, development manager and educator
- Sundeep Jora, Nepalese cricketer
- Sandeep Joshi (Assam cricketer), Indian cricketer
- Sandeep Joshi (Haryana cricketer), Indian cricketer
- Sandeep Jyoti, Indian-born Canadian cricketer
- Sandeep Kandola, Indian Kabaddi player
- Sandeep Khare, Marathi poet, performing artist, actor, singer-songwriter, copywriter
- Sandeep Khosla, Indian fashion designer
- Sundeep Kishan, Indian actor and producer
- Sandeep Kulkarni, Indian film actor
- Sandeep Kumar (disambiguation)
- Sandeep Lamichhane, Nepalese International cricketer
- Sundeep Malani (born 1971), Indian film director, screenwriter and actor
- Sandeep Mathrani (born 1962), Indian-American real estate executive
- Sandeep Mukherjee (born 1964), Indian-American artist
- Sandeep Naik, Indian politician
- Sandeep Nath, Indian lyricist, composer, screenwriter and director
- Sandeep Pampally, Indian film director
- Sandeep Pandey, Indian social activist
- Sandeep Parikh, American writer, director, actor and producer of comedy
- Sandeep Pathak (born 1978), Indian film, television and theatre actor
- Sandeep Pathak (born 1979), Indian politician and Rajya Sabha member
- Sandeep Patil, Indian cricketer, cricket manager and coach
- Sandeep Prayag, Mauritian politician
- Sandeep Rajora (born 1967), Indian television actor
- Sandeep Sejwal, Indian swimmer
- Sandeep Sharma (born 1993), Indian cricketer
- Sandeep Shetty, Indian actor
- Sandeep Shirodkar, Indian film score composer, music director and record producer
- Sandeep Singh, Indian field hockey player
- Sandeep Singh Brar, Sikh historian and photographer
- Sandeep Unnikrishnan AC, Major in the Indian Army
- Sandeep Reddy Vanga, Indian film director, screenwriter and editor
- Sundeep Waslekar (born 1959), Indian author
- Sandeep Warrier, Indian international cricketer

== See also ==
- Sandeep (disambiguation)
- Sandip, an alternative spelling of the given name Sandeep
- Sandeepa Dhar, Indian actress
