= Sandeep =

Sandeep may refer to:

- Sandeep (given name), an Indian given name, primarily male

== People ==
- Sandeep, indian para athlete

== See also ==
- Sandip, an alternative spelling of the given name Sandeep
- Sandeepa Dhar, Indian actress
- Sandwip, an island in Sandwip Upazila
- Sandwip Upazila, a sub-district in Bangladesh
