= Joseph Hulse =

Joseph Hulese may refer to:

- Joe Hulse (1899-1963), English footballer, see List of Bury F.C. players (1–24 appearances)
- Joseph H. Hulse (1923-2013), Canadian biochemist, food technologist, writer
