= Vishweshwaraiah Prakash =

Indian structural biologist and food technologist

- Born: 23 November 1951 (age 74); Karnataka, India
- Occupations: Structural biologist Food technologist
- Known for: Food technology
- Awards: Padma Shri; Shanti Swarup Bhatnagar Prize; MY Golden Jubilee Award; P. S. Sarma Memorial Award; Laljee Godhoo Smarak Nidhi Award; Rajyotsava Prashasthi; Independence Golden Jubilee Award; Prof. V. Subramanyan Industrial Achievement Award; CFTRI Best Alumnus YayAward; Soilendra Krishna Mitra Memorial Award; DuPont Protein Technologies International Award; FICCI Award; Kashalkar Memorial Award; GoK Lifetime Achievement Award; SCI Lifetime Achievement Award; IUoFST Lifetime Achievement Award

Vishweshwaraiah Prakash is an Indian structural biologist, food technologist and a former director-general designate of the Council of Scientific and Industrial Research (CSIR). He is a former director of the Central Food Technological Research Institute (CFTRI), Mysore and was involved with the International Union of Food Science and Technology as the chairman of its International Academy during 2008-10. He received the Shanti Swarup Bhatnagar Prize, the highest Indian award in the science and technology category in 1996. The Government of India awarded him the fourth highest civilian honour of the Padma Shri in 2004,

== Biography ==
Prakash was born in the south Indian state of Karnataka on 23 November 1951, graduated (BSc) from Mysore University and followed it up with a master's degree (MS) from the same institution. Later, he secured his doctoral degree (PhD) from University of Mysore in 1976 and, obtaining a fellowship, he moved to US in 1976 and did post-doctoral research at Texas Medical Centre in Houston and Brandeis University, Boston till 1980. He returned to India in 1981 and joined Council of Scientific and Industrial Research (CSIR) as a Pool Officer at their Mysore research unit, Central Food Technological Research Institute (CFTRI). He served the organization for several years and became its director in 1994. He headed the centre for 13 years till his appointment as the director-general of CSIR in December 2006 and was supposed to take charge in January 2007, but did not assume office. In 2008, he was selected as the president of the International Academy of the International Union of Food Science and Technology (IAFoST), a global association of food technologists and held the office till 2010.

Prakash is known to have done extensive research in structural homology of seed proteins and the association-dissociation and denaturation profiles of these proteins. His work is reported to have assisted in the understanding of the behaviour of several seed proteins from a stability perspective and revealed more about their structural biology. His research findings have been documented by way of over 200 articles published in CFTRI publications and other peer reviewed national and international journals. His researches are known to have wide-ranging applications in commercial food industry and he holds 50 patents, some of them on preserved sugar cane juice, coconut sap (Neera) and baked snacks. Besides, he has written six books and 20 review chapters; Leafy spices, a reference guide on the botanical and agricultural aspects of agro-products yielding essential oils of leafy spices, is one among them. During his tenure as the head of CFTRI, he established the Advanced School of Protein Chemistry and Technology, for advanced research. His contributions are also reported behind the CFTRI initiative to supply 200,000 food packages to the victims of the 2004 Indian Ocean earthquake and tsunami that hit the Indian coasts, along with other areas.

Prakash serves as the president of two major food-related organizations, namely, the International Society of Nutraceuticals And Nutritionals (ISNAN), and Indian Academy of Nutraceuticals and Nutritionals (IANAN), and is a former president of the Nutrition Society of India (NSI). During his stint at CFTRI, he coordinated the activities of the United Nations University at the institution and chaired the Food and Agriculture Organization (FAO) panel on Food Losses and Food Wastes as well as the FAO High Level Panel of Experts on Food Security and Nutrition (HLPE). He serves as a member of the Editorial Board of Comprehensive Reviews in Food Science and Food Safety, a journal published by the Institute of Food Technologists, chairs the Advisory Board of the NuFFooDS Magazine, and sits in the executive editorial Board of the Journal of the Science of Food and Agriculture, published by John Wiley & Sons. He is an IUoFST visiting faculty at Saigon Technology University and an adjunct professor of Nutrition at the Tufts University, Boston. He chairs the Task Force on Nutritionals and Nutraceuticals of International Union of Nutritional Sciences and Technology and the Research Advisory Committee of the Central Institute of Fisheries Technology (CIFT), Kochi. He is also a member-at-large of the Global Harmonization Initiative (GHI), a scientific community facilitating scientific advancement in food technology.

== Awards and honours ==
Indian Academy of Sciences elected Prakash as their fellow in 1995 and National Academy of Agricultural Sciences followed suit in 1998. The National Academy of Sciences, India honoured him with Fellowship in 2002 and the next year, the Royal Society of Chemistry elected him as a Fellow. He is also an elected Fellow of the International Union of Food Science and Technology, Indian National Academy of Engineering, Indian Academy of Social Sciences and the Association of Food Scientists and Technologists, India (2008).

Prakash, a Distinguished Scientist of the Council of Scientific and Industrial Research, is reported to have received over 55 awards including award lectures, starting with the 1988 Golden Jubilee Award of Mysore University, followed by P. S. Sarma Memorial Award of the Society of Biological Chemists (India) in 1989 and Laljee Godhoo Smarak Nidhi Award of the Association of Food Scientists and Technologists, India in 1992. He was awarded the Shanti Swarup Bhatnagar Prize of the CSIR, the highest Indian science award, in 1996 and the Government of Karnataka awarded him the second highest civilian award of the state, Rajyotsava Prashasthi, the same year. He received the Indian Independence Golden Jubilee Award in 1997 and two awards, Prof. V. Subramanyan Industrial Achievement Award and CFTRI Best Alumnus Award, in 1999. All India Food Processors' Association (AIFPA) honoured him with Soilendra Krishna Mitra Memorial Award in 2000 and the year 2001 brought him two more awards, DuPont Protein Technologies International Award and FICCI Award in Life Sciences and Agriculture, followed by Kashalkar Memorial Award in 2003.

The Government of India included Prakash in the 2004 Republic Day honours list for the civilian honour of the Padma Shri. The Government of Karnataka honoured him again with Lifetime Achievement Award in 2012 and the Lifetime Achievement Award of SCI, UK reached him in 2013, the same year as he received the Lifetime Achievement Award of the International Union of Food Science and Technology. 38th B.C. Guha Memorial Lecture Award of the Indian Science Congress (2001), 6th Golden Jubilee Commemorative Talk Award of the Central Institute of Fisheries Technology (2007), 19th Srikantia Memorial Lecture Award of Nutrition Society of India (2007), C. Ramachandran Memorial Lecture Award of NFI (2007) and Dr. Rajammal P. Devdas's Oration Lecture Award of the Avinashilingam University for Women, (2009) are some of the notable orations delivered by him.

== See also ==
- Central Food Technological Research Institute
- Council of Scientific and Industrial Research
