= Sandeep Joshi =

Sandeep Joshi may refer to:

- Sandeep Joshi (Assam cricketer), former Assam cricketer
- Sandeep Joshi (Haryana cricketer), former Haryana cricketer
