= Journal of Food Science and Technology =

- Discipline: Food science, biotechnology
- Language: English
- Edited by: N. Bhaskar

Publication details
- History: 1964-present
- Publisher: Springer Science+Business Media
- Frequency: Bimonthly
- Impact factor: 3.117 (2021)

Standard abbreviations
- ISO 4: J. Food Sci. Technol.

Indexing
- CODEN: JFSTAB§
- ISSN: 0022-1155 (print); 0975-8402 (web)
- LCCN: sa65001040
- OCLC no.: 01800339

Links
- Journal homepage; Online archive

The Journal of Food Science and Technology is a bimonthly peer-reviewed scientific journal covering food science and food technology. It was established in 1964 and is published by Springer Science+Business Media on behalf of the Association of Food Scientists and Technologists of India, of which it is the official journal. The editor-in-chief is N. Bhaskar (Central Food Technological Research Institute). According to the Journal Citation Reports, the journal has a 2021 impact factor of 3.117 .
