= Aditya Prasad Dash =

Renowned biologist specializing in malaria and vector-borne diseases

Aditya Prasad Dash (born 23 March 1951), who hails from the Indian State of Odisha, is an Indian biologist with special interest in malaria and vector borne diseases. His areas of interest include biomedical science, transmission biology of tropical disease, and modern biology of disease vectors. According to Vidwan, the national network for researchers and experts, Dash has authored 320 publications co-authored 699 publications. Since September 2020, Dash has been serving as the Vice Chancellor of Asian Institute of Public Health (AIPH) in Bhubaneswar. Before joining AIPH, he was the Vice Chancellor of Central University of Tamil Nadu during the period from August 2015 to August 2020. He had also worked at the World Health Organization (WHO) as the Regional Advisor for the South-East Region. He has also worked as the Director of the National Institute of Malaria Research (NIMR), New Delhi, of the Institute of Life Sciences (ILS), Bhubaneswar and of the National Institute for Research on Tribal Health, Jabalpur.

== Contributions to biomedical science ==
Dash's work helped in showing that Anopheles annularis is an important vector in rural areas and in the identification of telomerase activity in gametocytes of Plasmodium falciparum. Through his research, Dash demonstrated the efficacy of drug combinations and also of Mass Drug Administration (MDA) in India. His finding that supplementing MDA with integrated vector management can prevent Lymphatic filariasis transmission more efficiently than MDA alone has been included in the Lymphatic filariasis elimination plan of the WHO. He developed an animal model for chemotherapeutic and immunological studies for parasitic diseases. Dash has also developed a simple technique for detecting dengue virus antigens in desiccated mosquitoes. He did some fundamental research correlating the change in vector borne disease epidemiology to the change in climate parameters.

His work employing multiple genetic fragments with DNA sequencing studies corroborated the inferences on the phylogenetic interrelationships among Indian malaria vectors with the inferences based on the traditional cyto-taxonomical approaches. Dash has also worked in comparative genomic studies of genomes of malaria parasites and the results he obtained revealed genomic similarities between the genomes of the parasites. Dash's contribution in scanning the whole genome of the African malaria vector revealed interesting genomic organization of this species. Dash has also contributed in developing novel genomic markers to understand the population structure and demographic history of Indian P. vivax. This information has provided baselines for the study of genetic pattern of drug resistance and virulence associated genes in field populations of this species.

He has undertaken several field trials of various intervention measures and these trials helped to translate laboratory findings into deliverable products.

== Recognition: Padma Shri ==
- In the year 2022, Govt of India conferred the Padma Shri award, the third highest award in the Padma series of awards, on Aditya Prasad Dash for his distinguished service in the field of science and engineering. The award is in recognition of his service as a "Distinguished Biologist specializing in vector-borne tropical diseases like dengue, malaria, kala-azar, chikungunya".

== Other recognitions ==
Many awards have been conferred upon Dash for his contributions to the development of public health programmes. These include:

- Dr. T.R. Rao award of ICMR (1991) for Young Scientists
- Oration Award of Indian Society for Communicable Diseases (2002)
- Rajiv Gandhi Foundation Award (2005) from His Excellency the Governor of Orissa
- Dr A.P. Ray award for outstanding contributions in malaria research (2012) from Director General Health Services, Govt. of India
- INBUSH award for outstanding scientific contribution by Amity University Delhi, 2016
- Lifetime Achievement award at the Skill and Vocational Education Summit in 2017
- Rashtriya Gaurav Award by the India International Friendship Society, New Delhi in 2018

== Fellowships/Memberships ==
- Fellow of the National Academy of Sciences (F.N.A.Sc)
- Fellow and Life Member of the Academy of Medical Sciences, India (F.A.M.S)
- Fellow and Life Member of the Indian Society for Malaria & Other Communicable Diseases (F.I.S.C.D.)
- Fellow and Life Member of the Zoological Society of India (F.Z.S.I.)
- Fellow and Life Member of the Environmental Science Academy (F.N.E.S.A.)
- Life Member of the Indian Parasitological Society
- Life Member of the Indian Society of Microbiologists
- Founder Life member of the National Academy of Vector Borne Diseases

== See also ==
- Padma Shri Award recipients in the year 2022
