= International Review of Food Science and Technology =

The International Review of Food Science and Technology is a British yearly food science and technology publication done by Sovereign Publications in the United Kingdom for the International Union of Food Science and Technology (IUFoST).

Its publication deals with issues on food science and technology, including food allergy, food chemistry, food engineering, food processing, and product development.

The editor-in-chief in 2007 was Peter Berry Ottaway.
