= Shubha V. Iyengar =

Indian aerospace scientist

Shubha Venkatesha Iyengar (born 1954) is an Indian scientist. She is best known for her contributions to the civil aviation, defence and indigenous technology sectors in India. She served at the CSIR-National Aerospace Laboratories for almost five decades (46 years).

== Biography ==
Shubha Venkatesha Iyengar was born in Bengaluru on 14 May 1954 as the youngest in a family of nine children. She faced barriers to continue her higher education in science, at a time when girls in India faced severe societal restrictions when wishing to pursue their preferred education and career. However, she was encouraged by her father to pursue her studies in science.

== Career ==
Iyengar made outstanding progress in her higher education, achieving distinctions in both her graduation and post-graduation studies at the Bangalore University. She received gold medals in physics and obtained first rank in the MSc physics examination in 1974. As a result of her distinction, she received a Government of India merit scholarship. She became a research scientist at the National Aerospace Laboratories in 1974, assigned to the Material Science Division and the Airport Instrument Division. While with the National Aerospace Laboratories, her role centred on designing and improving devices that support safer aircraft operations. She focused on developing gadgets to combat challenging weather and low-visibility conditions, which were central to the aviation industry and was engaged in creating devices incorporating portable, FPGA-based humidity and temperature sensors.

In 2011, Iyengar collaborated with the Indian Meteorological Department and conceptualised a unique model to monitor aviation weather and runway visibility measurement, which was later named as "Drishti". The innovative Drishti transmissometer has since been approved by the Government of India and has been predominantly used in various international airports in India as well as by the Indian Air Force. Prior to her innovation, the aviation industry had to make arrangements to ensure safe landings on fog-covered runways. Iyengar pioneered a cost-effective, indigenous homegrown system which could measure runway visibility and weather conditions and could detect possibilities for planes to land safely even in poor visibility. Before Drishti, Indian airports had had to purchase expensive runway visibility measuring instruments from Finland and Australia. Over the years, Drishti gained widespread international attention, as prominent organizations such as the World Meteorological Organization and the International Civil Aviation Organization recommended its usage. She was actively involved in India's defense system and on one occasion served as chief architect to solve complex technical issues that had prevented the Agni missile from reaching its intended target.

She devised a blueprint for developing indigenous components able to withstand temperatures of 3000K, while operating at optimum speed levels of Mach 5. Eventually her indigenous components were required for use in missile systems and ramjet-scramjet engines. The components have been vital in India's satellite launch initiatives over the years. Some of her research papers were published as official reports by NASA, taking insights from Iyengar's technical knowledge on aviation and space.

In 2015, Iyengar received the "Make in India" award, in recognition of her contributions to indigenous technological development and self-reliance. She retired from National Aerospace Laboratories in 2020 after having served for 46 years. In 2026, she was a recipient of the Padma Shri award, India’s fourth-highest civilian honour, in the category of Science and Engineering, in recognition of her contributions to aerospace technology.

== See also ==
- List of Padma Shri award recipients (2020–2029)
- List of Padma Shri award recipients in science and engineering
