= N. Prabhakar =

Indian missile scientist (1954–2015)

- Born: 18 April 1954; Tamil Nadu, India
- Died: 15 August 2015 (aged 61)
- Occupation: Missile scientist
- Awards: Padma Shri; DRDO Scientist of the year Award; DRDO Path Breaking Technology Award; DRDO Performance Excellence Award; Astronautical Society of India Award

N. Prabhakar was an Indian scientist and the Chief Controller, System Analysis and Modelling Centre (SAM-C) of the Defence Research and Development Organization (DRDO). He graduated in Electrical and Electronics Engineering (BE) from Annamalai University and enrolled at the Indian Institute of Science, Bengaluru from where he obtained his master's degree (ME). He pursued his research at Shanmugha Arts, Science, Technology & Research Academy, secured a doctoral degree in Air Defence Systems and joined the Defence Research and Development Laboratory (DRDL) in 1980.

Prabhakar worked at DRDO in various capacities including Project Director AD (Mission), Program Director (ASTRA) and Associate Director of Defence Research and Development Laboratory (DRDL). He is known to have contributed to the development of Trajectory Optimization for Prithvi, AD Weapon System Design and Optimal Guidance Algorithms for Ballistic Missile Intercept Missions besides preparing the feasibility report for all Indian tactical missile programmes.

A Fellow of the Institution of Engineers (India), the Operational Research Society (UK) and the Aeronautical Society of India, Prabhakar is a recipient of three DRDO awards such as DRDO Scientist of the year Award in 2001, the Path Breaking Technology Award in 2007 and Performance Excellence Award in 2009 as well as the ASI Award from the Astronautical Society of India in 2009. The Government of India honoured him in 2015, with the award of Padma Shri, the fourth highest Indian civilian award for his contributions to Indian missile programme.

== See also ==
- Institution of Engineers (India)
- Operational Research Society
- Aeronautical Society of India
- Defence Research and Development Organization
- Defence Research and Development Laboratory
- Annamalai University
- Indian Institute of Science
- Shanmugha Arts, Science, Technology & Research Academy
