= Ponisseril Somasundaran =

Mineral engineer

- Born: 28 June 1939 (age 87); Kerala, India
- Occupation: Mineral engineer
- Awards: Padma Shri; Member, National Academy of Engineering; Antoine M. Gaudin Award; Robert H. Richards Award; Arthur F. Taggart Award; Ellis Island Medal of Honor; Senate Leadership Citation; Frank F. Aplan Award; Mill Man of Distinction Award; SME Publication Board Award; Most Distinguished Achievement in Engineering Award

Ponisseril Somasundaran (born 28 June 1939) is an American mineral engineer of Indian origin and a LaVon Duddleson Krumb Professor of Mineral Engineering at Columbia University, New York.

In 2010 the Government of India honoured him with the award of Padma Shri, the fourth highest civilian award, for his contributions to the fields of science and technology.

== Biography ==
Ponisseril Somasundaran hails from Kerala, India, and did his graduate studies (BSc) in 1958 from the University of Kerala. Opting to pursue a career in engineering, he joined the Indian Institute of Science, Bangalore and completed the degree of Bachelor of Engineering (BE) in 1961. Further studies were in the US, where he passed MS in 1962 followed by doctoral degree (PhD) in 1964 from the University of California, Berkeley.

Somasundaran started his career by joining the National Chemical Laboratory, Pune, India, as a senior laboratory assistant in 1958, where he stayed only for one year. After migrating to the US, he joined the faculty of University of California, Berkeley as a research cum teaching assistant in 1961, a job which lasted till 1964, when he moved to Illinois to work for the International Minerals and Chemicals Corporation, Libertyville, as a research engineer. The next move was to R. J. Reynolds Industries, Inc., Winston-Salem in 1967 as a research chemist.

In 1970, Somasundaran returned to teaching as an associate professor of mineral engineering at the Columbia University, got promoted as the professor in 1978, a post he held till 1983. In between, he served as the acting chairman of the school of mines, there in May–July 1976, visiting professor at the Indian Institute of Science from January till April and later, at the University of Melbourne from May till July in 1977. In 1983, Somasundaran was conferred the title of La Von Duddleson Krumb Professor of Mineral Engineering of the University, the first person to receive the title. He was also made the director of the Langmuir Center for Colloids and Interfaces in 1987.

A year later, in 1988, Somasundaran was appointed as the chairman of Henry Krumb School of Mines, under the department of minerals, metals and mineral engineering and held the post till 1997. He is the incumbent director of the National Science Foundation, at the Center for Advanced Studies in Novel Surfactants and the Center for Particulate and Surfactant Systems (since 2008).

Somasundaran has been a member of the planning board and is the member of the Piermont Board of Appeals. He has also been a member of the National Research Council and the National Science Foundation Advisory Committees. A former chairman of the board of the Engineering Foundation from 1993 to 1995, He serves on the board of the United Engineering Foundation.

Somasundaran has published several publications, reportedly fifteen books, over 700 scientific articles and holds many patents. ResearchGate has listed 339 articles by him in their online repository.

Somasundaran is the honorary editor-in-chief of Colloids and Surfaces, an international scientific journal published by Elsevier.

== Awards and recognitions ==
Ponisseril Somasundaran is a member of the National Academy of Engineering since 1985, the highest professional honour given by the Academy. He received the Antoine M. Gaudin Award in 1982 and five years later, in 1987, he received two awards, the Robert H. Richards Award and the Arthur F. Taggart Award. He has also received the Ellis Island Medal of Honor (1990), Senate Leadership Citation from New Jersey senate, (1991) the Frank F. Aplan Award from the Engineering Foundation in 1992, Mill Man of Distinction Award and SME Publication Board Award Holder of the Most Distinguished Achievement in Engineering citation from AINA, Somasundaran was honoured by the Government of India with the Padma Shri award, in 2010, when he was included in the Republic Day honours.

Somasundaran is a member of the National engineering academies of India, China and Russia and has held the positions of the Honorary Professor of Central University of Technology, China and the Honorary Research Advisor of Beijing Research Institute of Mining and Metallurgy, Beijing.

== See also ==
- National Academy of Engineering
