= Sandip Chakravarty =

Tabla player, musician, DJ and tv presenter

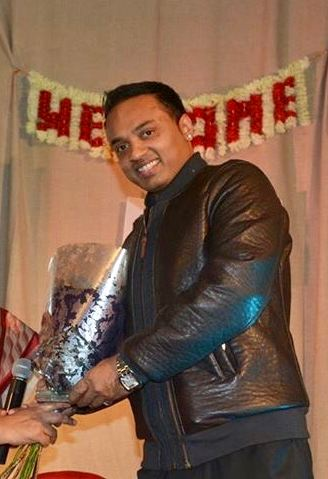

Background information
- Born: London
- Genres: World music, Jazz Fusion, Bollywood
- Occupations: Musician, DJ
- Instruments: Tabla, World percussion, octopads
- Years active: 1993 - present
- Website: sandyman.tv

Sandip Chakravarty, better known by his stage name Sandyman, is a tabla player, musician, DJ and tv presenter.

== Early life and career ==
Chakravarty was born in London to a family of musicians. His interest in tabla was aroused when he first heard tabla player Ustaad Zakir Hussain. At the age of 7, Chakravarty was brought to India by her mother to learn classical musical genre. He moved back to London due to his father's illness and completed a diploma in Computer Science there.

He made his public appearance at the Royal Albert Hall, London at the age of 16 and was nominated to be part of "Asians in the Millenium". His debut album is Mangu Dua featuring Bollywood singer Shaan. Sandyman has collaborated with numerous playback singers like, Bappi Lahiri, Kumar Sanu, Anup Jalota, Shaan, Ustad Rahat Fateh Ali khan and others. He has performed for Sir Paul McCartney. He also has performed at the Royal Albert hall with The Bootleg Beatles.

He has also performed and toured with the UK based Jazz band, John Mayers Indo Jazz Fusions. He earned the reputation as Beatle Tabla player and performed tabla shows on Bollywood and English songs.
