= Mahendra Pal =

Indian scientist and academician

- Born: April 10, 1946 (age 80)
- Citizenship: India
- Education: Kumaon University; Utkal University
- Occupations: Scientist, Academician
- Known for: Veterinary Public Health, Microbiology
- Awards: Padma Shri; Jawaharlal Nehru Award

Mahendra Pal (born 10 April 1946) is an Indian scientist and academician who is known for his contribution to Veterinary public health and Microbiology. He is known as the father of Veterinary Mycology in India for his research on the role of fungi in diseases. He is a former professor of Veterinary public health at Addis Ababa University. In 2023, the Government of India awarded him the Padma Shri for his contributions in science.

== Education ==
In 1969, Prof. Pal obtained his BVSc and AH degree from the College of Veterinary Science in Mathura, followed by MVPH from the All India Institute of Hygiene and Public Health in Kolkata in 1975. He completed his Ph.D. from the Faculty of Science at Kumaon University in Nainital in 1981. Later, he did his D.Sc. from the Faculty of Science at Utkal University in Bhubaneshwar in 2008. He received the ICAR Merit Scholarship from Indian Council of Agricultural Research during BVSc & AH and the ICAR Junior Fellowship during MVPH.

== Career ==
He has served in Veterinary and Medical Colleges in India and abroad. As a researcher, he has published over 575 papers and authored 8 books. His work elucidated the etiologic role of many fungi in various animal diseases and established the prevalence of these fungi worldwide.

He served as the Deputy Editor of the International Journal of Medical and Veterinary Mycology in Germany. He holds positions as honorary editor in chief, editor, associate editor, and member of the editorial board for several peer-reviewed online scientific journals. He has advised numerous online scientific publications and assisted them with research, publication, or education.

His research interests includes veterinary public health, infectious diseases, food microbiology, epidemiology of zoonoses, fungal infection diagnosis, dermatology, ecology of mycotic pathogens, food hygiene, occupational zoonoses, environmental health, and food safety.

He is credited for developing the Sunflower seed agar (Pal's medium), APRM medium, PHOL stain, and Narayan stain, specifically designed for the study of fungi.

He received the title of Fellow from both the National Academy of Veterinary Sciences and the Korean Society of Veterinary Clinical Medicine in Seoul, South Korea. The Indian Association of Veterinary Public Health Specialists (IAVPHS) has established an annual award named the "Prof. Mahendra Pal Zoonosis Award" in his honor.

== Awards and recognition ==
He has received several awards including

- Padma Shri, by Government of India in 2023
- Jawaharlal Nehru Award
- Sandoz Medical Times Prize
- Lifetime Achievement Award by the Indian Association of Veterinary Public Health
- In 2023, Mahendra Pal received the national "Outstanding Veterinarian Award" from Union Minister Parshottam Rupala during the World Veterinary Day ceremony on April 29, 2023, held at Vigyan Bhawan, New Delhi.
