= Molecular Nutrition & Food Research =

- Discipline: Nutrition science
- Language: English
- Edited by: Hans-Ulrich Humpf

Publication details
- Former name: Die Nahrung
- History: 1957-present
- Publisher: Wiley-Blackwell
- Impact factor: 6.575 (2021)

Standard abbreviations
- ISO 4: Mol. Nutr. Food Res.

Indexing
- ISSN: 1613-4125 (print); 1613-4133 (web)
- LCCN: 2004243775

Links
- Journal homepage; Online access; Online archive

Molecular Nutrition & Food Research is a peer-reviewed academic journal which focuses on molecular aspects of nutrition science. It was established in 1957 as Die Nahrung and obtained its current name in 2004. It was originally published by Akademie Verlag, but is now published by Wiley-Blackwell. The editor-in-chief is Hans-Ulrich Humpf (University of Münster).

== Abstracting and indexing ==
The journal is abstracted and indexed in:

- Science Citation Index
- PubMed/MEDLINE
- Scopus
- Chemical Abstracts Service
- Current Contents/Agriculture, Biology & Environmental Sciences
- PASCAL

According to the Journal Citation Reports, the journal has a 2013 impact factor of 4.909, ranking it 3rd out of 123 journals in the category "Food Science & Technology".
