= Mahiravani =

Village in Maharashtra

Coordinates: 19°58′N 73°40′E

- Village
- Interactive map of Mahiravani
- Country: India
- State: Maharashtra
- District: Nashik

Population (2015)
  - Total: 2,000
- Time zone: UTC+5:30 (IST)
- ZIP code(s): 422 213
- Area code: +91-2594
- Vehicle registration: MH-15

Mahiravani is a historical village in Nashik district of Maharashtra state of India. It is on the way from Nashik to Trimbakeshwar. The population of the village is around two thousand. Spoken language is Marathi.

== History ==
As per mythology of Indian Ramayana, Mahiravana [महिरावण] and Ahiravana [अहिरावण] was two brothers of devil Ravana [रावण]. They kidnapped Shrirama and his brother Lakshmana to sacrifice their goddess. God Hanumana who was devotee of Shriram kill both devil brothers Ahiravana, Mahiravana and rescued Shrirama and his brother. The village Mahiravani is named after devil Mahiravana and village Ahiravani was named after devil Ahiravana. The village Ahiravani is no more there and local people of village Mahiravani says that it was destroyed in some natural calamities like earthquake or flood. There are enough proofs to prove village Mahiravani as a historical village.

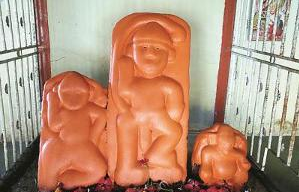
Two Maruti sculpture in village Mahiravani temple

== Geography ==
The village Mahiravani is exactly at the center of city Nashik & Trimbakeshwar, roughly 15 km from both the ends on the national highway 848 google map. The village is surrounded by high mountains and valleys. The weather is very healthy and supportive to crops. There are many temples and places to visit in and around village.

== Economy ==
The majority of the people are farmers and farm workers. Major population is mostly dependent on farming economy. In recent time, many educated people either started their own businesses or doing job. Grapes, tomato, cauliflower, soybean, wheat, rice are main crops. The village economy is boosting due to education and new technologies in farming. The national banks such as SBI, Central Bank of India, HDFC have set up their banking facilities in village.

== Education ==
The village Mahiravani has a pre-school facility in Marathi as well as English medium school, government primary school, private secondary school. Dr. Kalpana Chawla Memorial School, Sandip foundation's college of polytechnic, engineering, pharmacy and management college. Sandip University is another wing of Sandip Foundation which has started junior college, senior college, law college, and bachelor's degrees in computer science.

== People ==
Over 50% of the village population is youth under 30. Major last-name of people is Mande Khandbahale. Others are Wagh and Gorale. Professions can be seen from postman, engineers, doctors, teacher, businessman, professors, advocates, judge to social services such, police and as IPS officers. Major population of the village is engage in agriculture, thus agriculture is the main occupation of the village.

== Resources ==
Mahiravani dam is main source of water for drinking and irrigation. Also few farmers have their private well and bore-wells.
