= Palle Rama Rao =

Indian scientist (1937–2026)

- Born: 30 June 1937
- Died: 3 October 2026 (aged 89); Hyderabad, Telangana, India
- Education: IISc, Institute of Technology, Banaras Hindu University (now Indian Institute of Technology (BHU) Varanasi)
- Scientific career
- Fields: Physical & Mechanical Metallurgy

Palle Rama Rao (30 June 1937 – 3 October 2026) was an Indian scientist known for his contribution to the field of Physical and Mechanical Metallurgy. He was awarded Padma Vibhushan, India's second-highest civilian award, in 2011 by the President of India for his contributions to scientific community. He has collaborated and conducted research activities for over dozen universities and associations all over India and abroad and was a Fellow of the Royal Academy of Engineering. He was the acting chairman of the Governing Council, International Advanced Research Centre for Powder Metallurgy & New Materials (ARCI), Hyderabad.

== Education ==
Palle Rama Rao graduated with an MA (Physics) from Madras University, MSc (Nuclear Physics) from Andhra University; and PhD (Metallurgy) from the Institute of Technology, Banaras Hindu University (now Indian Institute of Technology (BHU) Varanasi). During 1966–67, he was postdoctoral research associate in the University of Pennsylvania.

He joined the Faculty, Department of Metallurgy, Indian Institute of Science (IISc), Bangalore in 1960, moved to Indian Institute of Technology (BHU) Varanasi in 1962 as Lecturer where he became the Professor of Physical Metallurgy (1975–82). Thereafter he was appointed Director, Defence Metallurgical Research Laboratory, Secretary to the Government of India, Department of Science and Technology and Ocean Development & Chairman, Atomic Energy Regulatory Board.

Rao was honoured as Fellow, INSA, National Academy of Science, Indian National Academy of Engineering, Andhra Pradesh Academy of Sciences; President, Indian Institute of Metals, Materials Res. Soc. of India.

== Career ==
=== Academic and research achievements ===
Rao began his research career with X-ray diffraction study of structural imperfections including development of new methods of analysis of X-ray line-broadening and prediction and experimental verification of fault configurations in double hexagonal close–packed crystals. He then turned to high temperature mechanical behaviour of metallic materials (tensile, creep, fatigue and fracture characteristics) some of which were undertaken for the first time in the country. He became involved in research-based alloy development during his tenure at the Hyderabad defence laboratory. Notable among these efforts is the development of an ultrahigh strength high fracture toughness low alloy steel. His current research interest is in understanding the effects of solutes on mechanical properties of magnesium and its hot workability. A major recent research programme addressed basic issue of fracture toughness in single phase and dilute alloys. He has to his credit nearly 160 journal papers, 30 edited volumes and over 50 publications in conference proceedings.

=== Other contributions ===
Rao contributed to setting up the Heavy Alloy Penetrator Plant, Tiruchirapalli, the first full-fledged ordnance factory to come up in India based on indigenous R&D, the International Advanced Research Center for Powder Metallurgy & New Materials, Hyderabad, Non-Ferrous Materials Technology Development Center, Hyderabad, National Institute of Ocean Technology, Chennai, Safety Research Institute, Kalpakkam and the Technology Development Board of DST. He was Editor of the Transactions of the Indian Institute of Metals and the Bulletin of Materials Science and served on the Editorial boards of Materials Science and Engineering (an international journal), International Journal of Fatigue and International Journal of Pressure Vessels and Piping. He also served as INSA Council Member.

== Death ==
Rao died in Hyderabad on 3 October 2026, at the age of 89.

== Awards and recognition ==
Rao was conferred the Shanti Swarup Bhatnagar Prize for Engineering Science in 1979, Homi J. Bhabha Award for Applied Sciences (1986), Padma Shri (1989), Prize for Materials Science by INSA (1989), Tata Gold Medal (1992) by Indian Institute of Metals (IIM), Platinum Medal (1994), National Metallurgist by the Union Ministry of Steel (1999), Jawaharlal Birth Centenary Award by the Indian Science Congress Association (ISCA) (1999), Padma Bhushan (2001), Sisir Kumar Mitra Memorial Lecture Award (2001), Meghnad Saha Medal (2004), Millennium Plaque of Honour (2003), Life Time Achievement Award" instituted by the Ministry of Steel, Government of India, Ashutosh Mukherjee Memorial Award (2009), G. M. Modi Award For Innovative Science, 2011 & Technology and Padma Vibhushan, 2011.

He was elected International Fellow of the Royal Academy of Engineering (UK), the Academy of Sciences for the Developing World, Ukrainian Academy of Sciences, Kyiv, Indian Academy of Sciences, Bangalore, US National Academy of Engineering (2012), National Academy of Sciences, India, Allahabad and Indian National Academy of Engineering.

Rao was president, Indian Academy of Sciences, Bangalore (1995–98), Indian National Academy of Engineering (2001–02), ISCA (General President) (1997–98), IIM (1990–91), Materials Research Society of India (1992–94), Indian Nuclear Society (2008–09), and International Congress on Fracture (1989–93); and vice-president, International Union of Materials Research Societies (2002–03). American Society of Materials awarded him their Distinguished Life Membership in 2004.

== See also ==
- Department of Science and Technology, Government of India
