= Sandip University, Nashik =

Private university in Nashik, India

- Motto: Simply World class
- Type: Private
- Established: 2017
- Accreditation: NAAC
- Affiliations: UGC , MAHARASHTRA GOV. ACT NO. XXXVIII OF 2015
- Chairman: Dr. Sandip N. Jha
- President: Nityanand Jha
- Vice-Chancellor: Dr. Pawan Bhaladhare
- Administrative staff: 1000+
- Location: Maharashtra, Mahiravani, Nashik, Maharashtra, India
- Campus: 250 acre; Urban
- Website: https://www.sandipuniversity.edu.in/

Sandip University is a private university, located in Nashik, Maharashtra, India. The university was established in 2017. Formerly a campus in Sijoul, Madhubani district, Bihar, it became a separate private university, Sandip University, Sijoul. It offers various undergraduate and postgraduate courses. * Sandip university is established by Government of Maharashtra Act No. XXXVIII of 2015 and is also recognised by UGC & Accredited 'A' grade by NAAC.

== Schools ==
- School of Engineering and technology (SOET)
- School of Computer Sciences & engineering
- School of Design (UX Design)
- School of Law
- School of Commerce & Management Studies
- School of Pharmaceutical Science
- School of Sciences
- School of Fashion Design & Beauty Cosmetology
- School of Interior Design
