= Sandip Basu =

Indian physician of Nuclear Medicine

- Known for: Studies on Positron emission tomography Diagnostics and Radionuclide Therapy
- Awards: 2010 SNM USA Alavi-Mandell Award; 2012 Shanti Swarup Bhatnagar Prize in Medical Sciences; 2017 DAE Homi Bhabha Science and Technology Award; 2019 Homi Bhabha Memorial Oration by the Society of Nuclear Medicine India
- Scientific career
- Fields: Nuclear medicine
- Institutions: Radiation Medicine Centre, Bhabha Atomic Research Centre, Tata Memorial Hospital Annexe, Parel, Mumbai; Homi Bhabha National Institute

Sandip Basu is an Indian physician of Nuclear Medicine and the Head, Nuclear Medicine Academic Program at the Radiation Medicine Centre (Bhabha Atomic Research Centre). He is also the Dean-Academic (Health-Sciences), BARC at Homi Bhabha National Institute and is known for his services and research in Nuclear Medicine, particularly on Positron emission tomography diagnostics and Targeted Radionuclide Therapy in Cancer. The Council of Scientific and Industrial Research, the apex agency of the Government of India for scientific research, awarded him the Shanti Swarup Bhatnagar Prize for Science and Technology, one of the highest Indian science awards for his contributions to Nuclear Medicine in 2012. (Note: Long link - please select award year to see details)

== Biography ==
Whole-body PET scan using 18F-FDG to show liver metastases of a colorectal tumor

Sandip Basu, is a Professor of Nuclear Medicine at the Radiation Medicine Centre, and Head, Nuclear Medicine Academic Programme, affiliated to the Health Sciences, BARC. He also serves as the dean-academics (Health Sciences), BARC at Homi Bhabha National Institute of the Department of Atomic Energy. He pursues his clinical patient services, academics and research interests at the Radiation Medicine Centre Bhabha Atomic Research Centre housed at Tata Memorial Hospital Annexe Building at Parel, Mumbai. (Note: Unstable link - you may need to copy paste the URL in address bar to see details) He is known for his clinical and applied research in the field of Nuclear Medicine, especially on positron emission tomography-based diagnostics and Targeted Radionuclide therapy. One major area of his research interests and clinical work has been the integration of functional radionuclide imaging and targeted radionuclide treatment which assisted in developing personalized management model and providing individualized treatment to patients of cancer. His studies have been documented by way of a number of articles (Note: Please see Selected bibliography section) of which many have been listed by online article repositories such as Google Scholar and ResearchGate. Besides, he has guest-edited six books viz. Breast Cancer Imaging I: Number 3, Breast Cancer Imaging II: Pet Clinics, Radiation Therapy Planning with PET: Number 2, Modern Quantitative Techniques for PET, PET Imaging of Brain Tumors, An Issue of PET Clinics and PET-Based Molecular Imaging in Evolving Personalized Management Design, An Issue of PET Clinics and has contributed chapters to books published by others.

Basu served as the national project coordinator of the IAEA-Regional Co-operative Agreement project at Bhabha Atomic Energy Centre on Strengthening the Applications of Nuclear Medicine in the Management of Cardiovascular Diseases. He serves as a member of the editorial boards of a number of journals including European Journal of Nuclear Medicine and Molecular Imaging, Nuclear Medicine Communications and Hellenic journal of Nuclear Medicine. He is also a former editor of World Journal of Radiology. He has been an author of more than 400 peer-reviewed papers and delivered several invited speeches in national/international conferences and symposiums.

In his capacity as the Dean-Academics, Medical and Health Sciences, BARC, Dr Basu took pivotal role in initiating the M.D. (Nuclear Medicine) course for doctors and the M.Sc.(Nuclear Medicine and Molecular Imaging Technology) and M.Sc. (Hospital Radiopharmacy) courses for science graduates, at the Radiation Medicine Centre (BARC) under the aegis of HBNI University, aimed at developing trained manpower in the field of Nuclear Medicine. The M.Sc. (Hospital Radiopharmacy) course at the Centre was first of its kind in India, providing structured training in the subject.

== Awards and honors ==
The Society of Nuclear Medicine and Molecular Imaging selected him for the Alavi-Mandell Award in 2010. The Council of Scientific and Industrial Research awarded Basu the Shanti Swarup Bhatnagar Prize, one of the highest Indian science awards in 2012. Dr. Basu was recipient of the DAE Homi Bhabha Science and Technology Award 2017 and the Homi Bhabha Memorial Oration 2019 at the 51st Annual Meeting of the Society of Nuclear Medicine India.

== Selected bibliography ==
=== Books ===
- Sandip Basu; Abass Alavi (9 July 2016). PET-Based Molecular Imaging in Evolving Personalized Management Design, An Issue of PET Clinics. Elsevier Health Sciences. ISBN 978-0-323-44871-0.
- Sandip Basu; Rakesh Kumar; Abass Alavi (1 December 2009). Breast Cancer Imaging I: Number 3. W.B. Saunders Company. ISBN 9781437709643.
- Sandip Basu; Rakesh Kumar; Ayse Mavi, Abass Alavi (28 January 2010). Breast Cancer Imaging II: Pet Clinics. Elsevier - Health Sciences Division. ISBN 978-1-4377-1402-9.
- Roger M. Macklis; Sushil Beriwal; Sandip Basu (13 June 2011). Radiation Therapy Planning with PET: Number 2. W.B. Saunders Company.
- Babak Saboury; Abass Alavi; Mateen Moghbel, Sandip Basu (2012). Modern Quantitative Techniques for PET. INTECH Open Access Publisher. ISBN 978-953-51-0359-2.
- Sandip Basu; Wei Chen (22 April 2013). PET Imaging of Brain Tumors, An Issue of PET Clinics. Elsevier Health Sciences. ISBN 978-1-4557-7221-6.
- Thomas, Wagner; Basu, Sandip (2018). PET/CT in Infection and Inflammation. Springer International Publishing. ISBN 978-3-319-90412-2.

=== Articles ===
- Basu S (November 2010). "Personalized versus evidence-based medicine with PET-based imaging". Nature Reviews Clinical Oncology. 7 (11): 665–8. doi:10.1038/nrclinonc.2010.121. PMID 20700107. S2CID 12124668.
- Sandip Basu, Narendra Nair (2006). "Relapse of cervical cancer presenting as symptoms of Collet-Sicard syndrome with metastatic subcutaneous and adrenal deposits". The Lancet Oncology. 7 (7): 610. doi:10.1016/S1470-2045(06)70764-1. PMID 16814215.
- Basu S, Chen W, Tchou J; et al. (March 2008). "Comparison of triple-negative and estrogen receptor-positive/progesterone receptor-positive/HER2-negative breast carcinoma using quantitative fluorine-18 fluorodeoxyglucose/positron emission tomography imaging parameters: a potentially useful method for disease characterization". Cancer. 112 (5): 995–1000. doi:10.1002/cncr.23226. PMID 18098228.
- Basu S, Sirohi B, Shrikhande SV (2014). "Dual tracer imaging approach in assessing tumor biology and heterogeneity in neuroendocrine tumors: its correlation with tumor proliferation index and possible multifaceted implications for personalized clinical management decisions, with focus on PRRT". Eur J Nucl Med Mol Imaging. 41 (8): 1492–6. doi:10.1007/s00259-014-2805-8. PMID 24863431.
- Basu S, Houseni M, Bural G, Chamroonat W, Udupa J, Mishra S, Alavi A. "Magnetic resonance imaging based bone marrow segmentation for quantitative calculation of pure red marrow metabolism using 2-deoxy-2-[F-18]fluoro-D-glucose-positron emission tomography: a novel application with significant implications for combined structure-function approach. Mol Imaging Biol. 2007 Nov-Dec;9(6):361-5.
- Sandip Basu, Mitali Dandekar, Amit Joshi, Anil D’Cruz (2015). "Defining a rational step-care algorithm for managing thyroid carcinoma patients with elevated thyroglobulin and negative on radioiodine scintigraphy (TENIS): considerations and challenges towards developing an appropriate roadmap". European Journal of Nuclear Medicine and Molecular Imaging. 42 (8): 1167–1171. doi:10.1007/S00259-015-3058-X. PMID 25989850.
- Basu S, Alavi A (2008). "Unparalleled contribution of 18F-FDG PET to medicine over 3 decades". J Nucl Med. 49 (10): 17N–21N, 37N. PMID 18832112.
- Basu S, Nair N, Awasare S, Tiwari BP, Asopa R, Nair C (2004). "99Tc(m)(V)DMSA scintigraphy in skeletal metastases and superscans arising from various malignancies: diagnosis, treatment monitoring and therapeutic implications". Br J Radiol. 77 (916): 347–61. doi:10.1259/bjr/72600472. PMID 15107330.
- Basu S, Zaidi H, Houseni M, Bural G, Udupa J, Acton P, Torigian DA, Alavi A.Novel quantitative techniques for assessing regional and global function and structure based on modern imaging modalities: implications for normal variation, aging and diseased states. Semin Nucl Med. 2007 May;37(3):223-39
- Basu S, Ranade R, Thapa P (2015). "Correlation and discordance of tumour proliferation index and molecular imaging characteristics and their implications for treatment decisions and outcome pertaining to peptide receptor radionuclide therapy in patients with advanced neuroendocrine tumour: developing a personalized model". Nucl Med Commun. 36 (8): 766–74. doi:10.1097/MNM.0000000000000321. PMID 25920048. S2CID 10252214.
- Thapa P, Nikam D, Das T, Sonawane G, Agarwal JP, Basu S (October 2015). "Clinical Efficacy and Safety Comparison of 177Lu-EDTMP with 153Sm-EDTMP on an Equidose Basis in Patients with Painful Skeletal Metastases". J Nucl Med. 56 (10): 1513–9. doi:10.2967/jnumed.115.155762. PMID 26315829.
- Basu S, Alavi A (2007). "Bone marrow and not bone is the primary site for skeletal metastasis: critical role of [18F]fluorodeoxyglucose positron emission tomography in this setting". J Clin Oncol. 25 (10): 1297, author reply 1297–9. doi:10.1200/JCO.2006.10.0123. PMID 17401027.
- Basu S, Nair N, Banavali S (2007). "Uptake characteristics of fluorodeoxyglucose (FDG) in deep fibromatosis and abdominal desmoids: potential clinical role of FDG-PET in the management". Br J Radiol. 80 (957): 750–6. doi:10.1259/bjr/53719785. PMID 17709361.
- Basu S, Ranade R, Thapa P (January 2016). "177Lu-DOTATATE versus 177Lu-EDTMP versus cocktail/sequential therapy in bone-confined painful metastatic disease in medullary carcinoma of the thyroid and neuroendocrine tumour: can semiquantitative comparison of 68Ga-DOTATATE and 18F-fluoride PET-CT aid in personalized treatment decision making in selecting the best therapeutic option?". Nucl Med Commun. 37 (1): 100–2. doi:10.1097/mnm.0000000000000397. PMID 26587985. S2CID 8869032.
- Basu S, Parghane RV. "Designing and Developing PET-Based Precision Model in Thyroid Carcinoma: The Potential Avenues for a Personalized Clinical Care. PET Clin. 2017 Jan;12(1):27-37.
- Basu S, Ranade R, Ostwal V, Shrikhande SV (July 2016). "PET-Based Molecular Imaging in Designing Personalized Management Strategy in Gastroenteropancreatic Neuroendocrine Tumors". PET Clin. 11 (3): 233–41. doi:10.1016/j.cpet.2016.02.004. PMID 27321028.
- Basu S, Kwee TC, Gatenby R, Saboury B, Torigian DA, Alavi A (June 2011). "Evolving role of molecular imaging with PET in detecting and characterizing heterogeneity of cancer tissue at the primary and metastatic sites, a plausible explanation for failed attempts to cure malignant disorders". Eur J Nucl Med Mol Imaging. 38 (6): 987–91. doi:10.1007/s00259-011-1787-z. PMID 21451997.
- Rani D, Kaisar S, Awasare S, Kamaldeep Abhyankar A, Basu S (September 2014). "Examining recombinant human TSH primed ¹³¹I therapy protocol in patients with metastatic differentiated thyroid carcinoma: comparison with the traditional thyroid hormone withdrawal protocol". Eur J Nucl Med Mol Imaging. 41 (9): 1767–80. doi:10.1007/s00259-014-2737-3. PMID 24687139. S2CID 33396401.
- Basu S, Torigian D, Alavi A (March 2008). "Evolving concept of imaging bone marrow metastasis in the twenty-first century: critical role of FDG-PET". Eur J Nucl Med Mol Imaging. 35 (3): 465–71. doi:10.1007/s00259-007-0593-0. PMID 17955239. S2CID 12675914.
- Basu S, Kand P, Mallia M, Korde A, Shimpi H (October 2013). "Gratifying clinical experience with an indigenously formulated single-vial lyophilized HYNIC-TOC kit at the radiopharmaceutical division of BARC: a pivotal boost for building up a peptide receptor radionuclide therapy programme in an Indian setting". Eur J Nucl Med Mol Imaging. 40 (10): 1622–4. doi:10.1007/s00259-013-2501-0. PMID 23857460. S2CID 36829829.
- Basu S, Alavi A (January 2008). "Staging with PET and the "Will Rogers" effect: redefining prognosis and survival in patients with cancer". Eur J Nucl Med Mol Imaging. 35 (1): 1–4. doi:10.1007/s00259-007-0506-2. PMID 17828536. S2CID 30453830.
- Basu S, Alavi A (April 2007). "Defining co-related parameters between 'metabolic' flare and 'clinical', 'biochemical', and 'osteoblastic' flare and establishing guidelines for assessing response to treatment in cancer". Eur J Nucl Med Mol Imaging. 34 (4): 441–3. doi:10.1007/s00259-006-0264-6. PMID 17072613. S2CID 5928921.
- Basu S, Banerjee S (February 2017). "Developing a dedicated comprehensive α-radionuclide therapy program: should this be the vision of the atomic energy programs in the next decade?". Nucl Med Commun. 38 (2): 103–105. doi:10.1097/MNM.0000000000000626. PMID 27906780. S2CID 1815387.
- Basu S, Banerjee S (July 2017). "Envisaging an alpha therapy programme in the atomic energy establishments: the priorities and the nuances". Eur J Nucl Med Mol Imaging. 44 (7): 1244–1246. doi:10.1007/s00259-017-3686-4. PMID 28364163. S2CID 3868711.

== See also ==
- Medical imaging
- Radiopharmaceuticals
- Fludeoxyglucose (18F)
- Standardized uptake value
