= Govind Lal =

Indian politician

Member of the Uttarakhand Legislative Assembly
- In office 2002–2012
- Preceded by: Constituency established
- Succeeded by: Constituency abolished
- Constituency: Pindar

Govind Lal is an Indian politician and member of the Bharatiya Janata Party. Lal was a member of the Uttarakhand Legislative Assembly from the Pindar constituency in Chamoli District.

== Electoral performance ==
2007 Uttarakhand Legislative Assembly election: Pindar
Party	Candidate	Votes	%	±%
BJP	Govind Lal	11,695	32.06%	▼4.70
INC	Bhupal Ram Tamta	8,562	23.47%	▼7.08
NCP	Dr. Jeet Ram	7,090	19.43%	New
UKD	Magan Lal Shah	3,543	9.71%	▲0.71
Samata Party	Baliram	1,692	4.64%	▲0.95
BSP	Khem Ram	1,422	3.90%	▲1.46
Independent	Harish Panchwal	1,059	2.90%	New
SP	Prem Ram Arya	717	1.97%	▼1.23
BJSH	Dhumi Lal	701	1.92%	New
Margin of victory		3,133	8.59%	▲2.38
Turnout		36,481	54.29%	▲2.81
Registered electors		67,484		▲19.40
BJP hold		Swing	▼4.70	

2002 Uttarakhand Legislative Assembly election: Pindar
Party	Candidate	Votes	%	±%
BJP	Govind Lal	10,647	36.75%	New
INC	Prem Lal Bharti	8,849	30.55%	New
UKD	Kishan Lal	2,607	9.00%	New
Independent	Jas Ram	2,543	8.78%	New
Independent	Shankar Lal	1,622	5.60%	New
Samata Party	Mahesh Shankar	1,069	3.69%	New
SP	K. D. Kanyal	927	3.20%	New
BSP	Khem Ram	705	2.43%	New
Margin of victory		1,798	6.21%	
Turnout		28,969	51.40%	
Registered electors		56,521		
BJP win (new seat)				
