= Sandip Banerjee =

Indian cricketer (born 1983)

Personal information
- Full name: Sandip Tanpan Banerjee
- Born: 20 December 1983 (age 42); Agartala, Tripura
- Batting: Right-handed
- Bowling: Right-arm medium
- Role: Batsman

Domestic team information
- Years: Team
- 2001/02–2005/06: Tripura
- Source: ESPNcricinfo, 20 April 2016

Sandip Tanpan Banerjee (born 20 December 1983) is an Indian first-class cricketer who plays for Tripura. He was born in Agartala.
