= Sandeep Kumar =

Sandeep Kumar may refer to:

- Sandeep Kumar (archer), Indian archer
- Sandeep Kumar (politician) (born 1980), Indian minister in Delhi government
- Sandeep Kumar (racewalker) (born 1986), Indian racewalker
- Sandeep Kumar (rower) (born 1988), Indian rower
- Sandeep Kumar (weightlifter) (born 1975), Indian weightlifter
- Sandeep Kumar (wrestler) (born 1983), Indian wrestler
