= AIPH University =

Public health university in Odisha, India

- Motto: Vidyayā'mritamașnute (Sanskrit)
- Motto in English: Knowledge Imparts Immortality
- Type: Private
- Established: 7 March 2018 (8 years ago)
- Affiliations: UGC
- Vice-Chancellor: A. P. Dash
- Director: Ranjan Mishra
- Location: City Campus- Pahala, NH 5 754001, Bhubaneswar, Odisha, India; 20.350264°N 85.889946°E
- Campus: Urban
- Website: www.aiph.ac.in

Asian Institute of Public Health University is a privately operated public health university located in Bhubaneswar, Odisha, India. It was established in 2008 to bring the much needed expertise in various domains of public health to Odisha, emerging from close to two decades of community, hospital, and laboratory-based research and training in public health & expanding its contribution to a larger audience in the rest of country and in the neighboring Asian countries sharing population health problems of similar nature and magnitude. It was received university status after the AIPH University, Odisha Bill, 2017 was passed by the Odisha Legislative Assembly. It is the first public health institute of India & the only entity in the country conducting public health education, research and service with expertise in all major domains of public health as well as the only institution that imparts required education at Masters and PhD levels in the major domains of public health and conducts population-based hospital and laboratory research. The university has collaborated with well known Indian & global healthcare associations like AIIMS New Delhi, ICMR, WHO, UNICEF, London School of Hygiene & Tropical Medicine etc.

== Campuses ==
=== City Campus ===
EAST Campus, Prachi Vihar, Anantapur, Phulnakhara, Pin-754101

=== Main Campus ===
1001 Haridamada, Jatani

Near IIT Bhubaneswar

== Academics ==
=== Undergraduate Courses ===
- Business administration
- Operation Theatre Technology
- Optometry
- Radiation & Imaging Technology

=== Postgraduate Courses ===
- Public health
- Microbiology
- Life Science
- Zoology
- Botany
- Virology
- Healthcare Management
- Hospital information system
- Physiotherapy

=== Ph.D Courses ===
- Cancer Epidemiology
- Environmental Health
- Child Health
- Infectious Diseases
- Molecular Biology
- Data Analytics and Disease Modeling

== Research Centres ==
- One Health Center for Surveillance and Disease Dynamics
- Center for Disease Epidemiology and Surveillance
- Center for Environment and Occupational Health
- Center for Elderly Health
- Center for Health and Public Policy
- Health Promotion and Behavioral Health Center

== Collaborations ==
=== National ===
- AIIMS New Delhi
- Govt Of Odisha
- ICMR
- NHM
- ICMR- NICPR
- Department of Scientific & Industrial Research

=== International ===
- WHO
- UNICEF
- Emory Rollins school of Public Health
- London School of Hygiene & Tropical Medicine
- UC Davis
- Duke University
- Bill & Melinda Gates Foundation
- National Institutes of Health
- Department for International Development
- University of Oklahoma
