= Joseph H. Hulse =

Canadian biochemist, food technologist and writer

- Born: 1923; Great Britain
- Died: October 22, 2013 (aged 89–90); Ottawa, Ontario, Canada
- Other name: Joe Hulse
- Occupations: Biochemist food technologist
- Years active: 1943–2013
- Known for: Food nutrition Social service
- Awards: Padma Shri; UMIST Outstanding Alumnus Award; PAS Distinguished Service Medal; Conservation of the Environment Award

Joseph H. Hulse (1923–2013) was a Canadian biochemist, food technologist, writer, and the president of the International Union of Food Science and Technology. He chaired the Committee of the Canadian chapter of the Freedom From Hunger, presided over the Canadian Institute of Food Science and Technology and was the assistant director of nutrition at the Food and Agriculture Organization, besides serving as the vice president of the International Development Research Centre (IDRC). He was the author of several texts and monographs on nutrition and allied sciences, including a 991-page treatise, Sorghum and the Millets: Their Composition and Nutritive Value. The Government of India awarded him the fourth highest civilian honour of the Padma Shri, in 2008, for his contributions to Science and for his humanitarian activities in India.

== Biography ==
With an increasing urban population that has to be fed and fewer people on land producing food, India faces a problem. The solution lies in helping farmers get out of subsistence farming into producing crops that they can sell and that can be processed locally. This would take care of the whole food chain – from producing and processing to marketing and consuming, said Joseph H. Hulse.

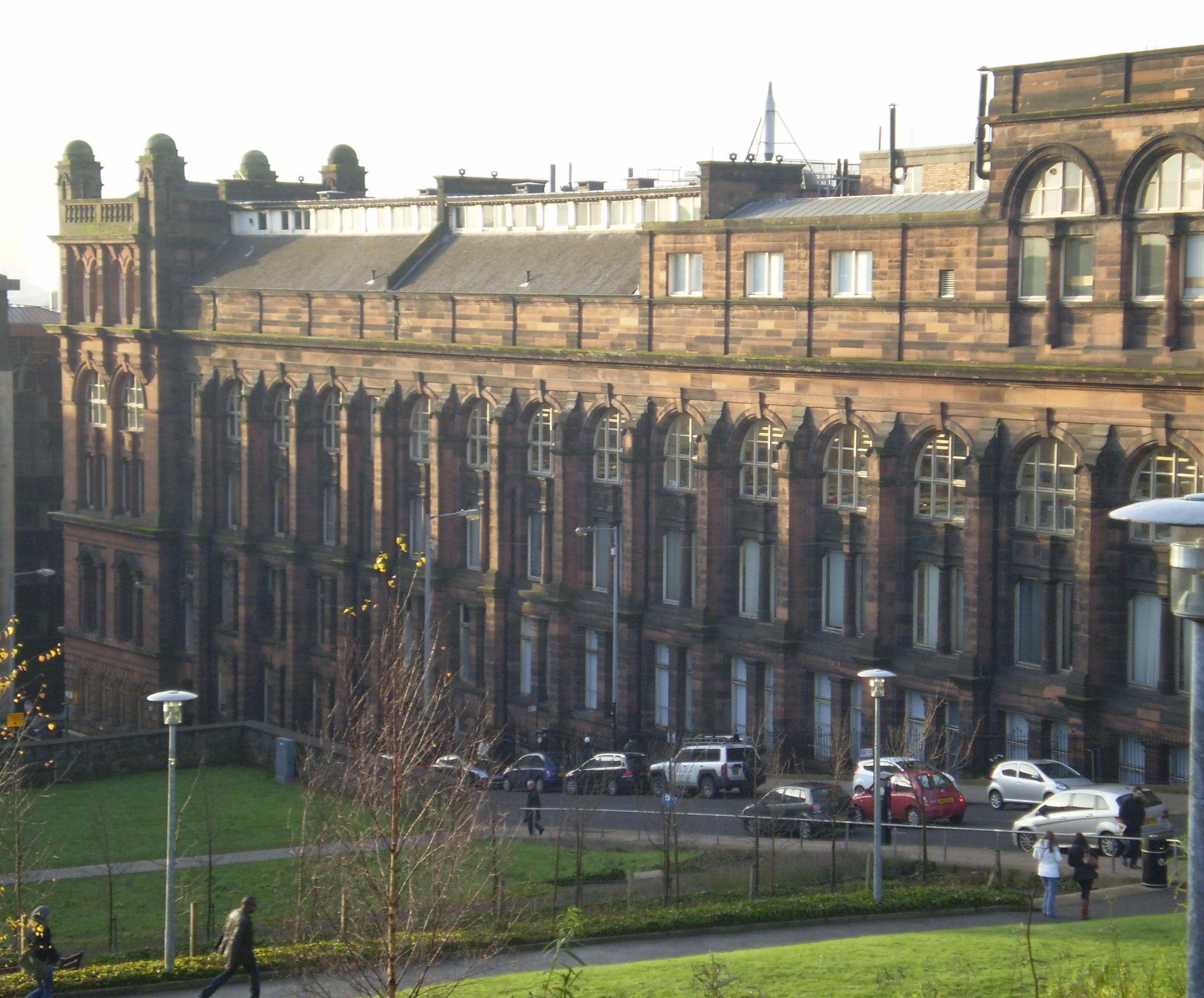
Royal College of Science and Technology.

Joseph Hulse was born in Great Britain as the son of a baker and started assisting his father from the age of 4. He graduated in Industrial Biochemistry from the University of Manchester in 1943 during which time, he also worked as a farm hand at a local pig and poultry farm. He started his career by joining the Royal Air Force as a Trainee Officer and worked at the Bomber Command till 1947, serving as the in-charge of the educational and vocational training of the air force personnel at the Command. Retiring from the RAF in 1947, he became associated with the British Baking Industries Research Association (BBIRA) and obtained a research fellowship for higher studies in pharmaceutical and food chemistry with which he joined the Royal College of Science and Technology of the Glasgow University, involving in research on baking, specifically on biochemical and biophysical mechanics of bread staling. During this period, he also served as a technical adviser to Scotland and Ireland chapters of BBIRA and his researches at RCST lasted till 1951.

In 1952, Hulse moved to Canada to join the Defence Research Medical Laboratories (DRML) of the Canadian Research Board, as a research biochemist, where he became the director of the Food and Nutrition Division, the youngest person to reach the position. He held the post till 1960 when he moved to the Maple Leaf Mills (MLM) as the Director of Research and worked there till 1966. During this time, he held two posts at the Canadian National Research Council; the vice-chair of the Committee on Fats and Oils, and the chair of the Food and Beverage Industries Committee. He was also a member of the Commission for the restructuring of the Winnipeg Grain Research Laboratories and worked on the Freedom from Hunger Canada (FFHC), as a committee member, chair of the Canada-Mysore Project and as the chair of the FFHC. He moved to Rome in 1967 to Food and Agriculture Organization as the assistant director where he was associated with the United Nations Development Program (UNDP), with the responsibility for developing nine large food industries. He was also involved in the Codex Alimentarius project, a global standard and set of guidelines related to food safety. He also worked as the Scientific Adviser to the Secretary-General of the United Nations on Food and Nutrition and as the adviser to the United Nations Economic and Social Council (ECOSOC). He stayed in Rome for two years but was invited back to Canada by Maurice Strong, the then president of the Canadian International Development Agency (CIDA), as the scientific adviser to the organization, where he oversaw agricultural projects including the storage of food and grain.

Hulse spent the next decade and half at International Development Research Centre (IDRC) where he started as the Director of the Agriculture, Food and Nutrition Sciences division (AFNS) while continuing his role as an adviser to CIDA for one more year. His stayed at the post in IDRC till 1984 when he was made the vice president with three divisions, AFNS, Health Sciences and Social Sciences divisions, reporting to him. It was during this period that he was involved in the establishment of the Consultative Group on International Agricultural Research (CGIAR) and remained involved in its activities as a founding member till his departure from IDRC in 1987. When CGIAR established five new International Agricultural Research Centers, Hulse acted as the executing agent of the program. In 1980, the African inter-governmental consortium of the Southern African Development Community (SADC) utilised his services as the chairman of its mission to set guidelines for food security. After his resignation from IDRC, he served as the member of a World Bank committee for the establishment of the International Centre on Forestry Research and as an adviser, delegated by the Government of Canada, to the West Bank and Gaza Strip for the establishment of an agro-industries institute for assisting the small farmers. He turned his focus to India in the 1990s which hosted many of his activities for the better part of the next two decades. During this period, he was known to have visited India over 60 times for stays of varying duration, and was involved with the Bio-villages Programme of M. S. Swaminathan Research Foundation. He was a visiting professor of the M. S. Swaminathan Research Foundation, Chennai and the Central Food Technological Research Institute, Mysore.

Joseph Hulse, who was associated with the Siemens-Hulse International Development Consultants, as its president, died on October 22, 2013, aged 90, at his residence in Ottawa, Ontario, Canada.

== Legacy ==
I personally can think of no Canadian active in the development field who has had more practical impact on the lives of the poor than Dr. Hulse, says David M. Malone, former president of the International Development Research Centre, Canada.

While working at the Royal Air Force at the educational and vocational training centre, Hulse was reported to have designed a free-fall dropping storage container for flour for use in food distribution at the famine-affected areas of the Netherlands. Later, during his researches at the Royal College of Science and Technology, he is known to have contributed in the development of Chorleywood Bread Process, a project the British Baking Industries Research Association (BBIRA) completed in 1961. He also spent time at the low temperature stations of Cambridge during his days at RCST and developed a new method of blood collection from bovines using cannula, to replace the slit-throat method in practice at that time. He also proposed the concept of using animal blood albumins in baked cakes. He was a part of the Committee on Fats and Oils of the Canadian National Research Council, which promoted the development of Canola oil.

In 1960, the Freedom from Hunger Canada (FFHC) accepted a proposal by Hulse for a joint venture project in India, under the name, Canada-Mysore Project (CMP) and he was made the chair of the project. Under the aegis of the project, he set up a committee with representation from 20 food companies and many non-governmental organizations such as Save the Children Fund, and established an institute, International Food Technology Training Centre (IFTTC), Mysore, in collaboration with Mysore University, which accredited the 2-year course food technology offered by the institute. The institution grew to become the Central Food Technological Research Institute (CFTRI), presently working under the Council for Scientific and Industrial Research (CSIR), a Government of India agency. Simultaneously, he was also a part of scientists who conceptualized the International Committee of Food Science and Technology (ICFoST), the latter day International Union of Food Science and Technology (IUFoST), and was involved with its activities till his death, serving as its president from 1979 to 1983.

His association with the M. S. Swaminathan Research Foundation brought him to India in the 1990s and he worked among the tribal women of Kerala, Tamil Nadu and Karnataka for introducing new food processing techniques and for training them in the trade. His contributions have also been reported in the identification and documentation of over 60 forest plant extracts, which have since been registered with the Indian Council of Medical Research. He was a part of a Government of Karnataka project for the rehabilitation of sexually exploited women where he initiated programs for training the women in horticulture, handicrafts and dairy farming.

Hulse, who is credited with over 250 articles, published his first book, The Science, Raw Materials and Hygiene of Baking, in 1952 which was co-authored by Alexander Urie. While working at the International Development Research Centre, he wrote a 997-page treatise, Sorghum and the Millets: Their Composition and Nutritive Value, co-authored by Evangeline Laing, Odette Pearson and published in 1980. Sustainable Development at Risk: Ignoring the Past, another book of Hulse published by IDRC in 2007, traces the history of the evolution of sustainable development as a concept and comments on the various aspects related to it. Polyphenols in Cereals and Legumes (1980) and Science, Agriculture, and Food Security (1995) are two other notable books published by him. Besides, he has also written monographs such as Triticale and Nutritive value of triticale protein (and the proteins of wheat and rye) and several reports including The Canadian Food Industries in National Survival, Nutritional Standards and Methods of Evaluation for Food Legume Breeders, World Food Resources – an Overview and Agriculture International Engine of Economic Advance.

== Awards and honours ==
Joseph Hulse, in his capacity as one of the founders of the International Committee of Food Science and Technology (ICFoST), delivered the inaugural Founder's Lecture at the IUFoST World Congress of 1991. He was an Outstanding Alumnus awardee (1998) and an elected Honorary Fellow of the University of Manchester Institute of Science and Technology (1978) and served as the Visiting Professor of Industrial Biotechnologies at the university. He was also elected as an Honorary Fellow by the national Institutes of Food Science and Technology of the UK, Australia and New Zealand, all in 1980 and the International Academy of Food Science and Technology (1997). A Life Fellow of the Association of Food Scientists and Technologists, India, he was elected as a Foreign Fellow of the National Academy of Sciences, India in 2006.

The Polish Academy of Sciences awarded him their Distinguished Service Medal in 1983. The Earth Society of India and the Rotary Club International selected him for the Conservation of the Environment Award in 1998 and he was the only non-Indian to receive the award. The Government of India awarded him the fourth highest civilian honour of the Padma Shri in 2008, placing him among the few foreigners to have received the award.

== Bibliography ==
- J. H. Hulse, A. Urie (1952). The Science, Raw Materials and Hygiene of Baking. Macdonald and Evans. p. 458. ASIN B0000EGLBE.
- Joseph H.. Hulse; Jane White (1960). The Canadian Food Industries in National Survival. Defence Research Board. p. 91.
- Joseph H. Hulse; David Spurgeon (1974). Triticale. Scientific American. p. 10.
- Joseph H. Hulse; Evangeline M. Laing (1974). Nutritive value of triticale protein (and the proteins of wheat and rye). International Development Research Centre (Canada) International Development Research Centre. p. 183.
- Joseph H. Hulse; Kenneth O. Rachie; L. W. Billingsley (1977). Nutritional Standards and Methods of Evaluation for Food Legume Breeders. International Development Research Centre. p. 100. ISBN 9780889361379.
- Joseph H. Hulse; Evangeline M. Laing; Odette E. Pearson (1980). Sorghum and the Millets: Their Composition and Nutritive Value. Academic Press. p. 997. ISBN 9780123613509.
- Joseph H. Hulse (1980). Polyphenols in Cereals and Legumes. International Development Research Centre. p. 72. ISBN 9780889362345.
- Joseph H. Hulse (1980). World Food Resources – an Overview. Australian Academy of Technological Sciences. p. 27.
- Joseph H. Hulse (1985). Agriculture International Engine of Economic Advance. Agricultural Institute of Canada. p. 27.
- Joseph H. Hulse (1995). Science, Agriculture, and Food Security. National Research Council Canada. p. 242. ISBN 9780660162102.
- Joseph H. Hulse (2007). Sustainable Development at Risk: Ignoring the Past. International Development Research Centre. p. 390. ISBN 9781552503683.

== See also ==
- International Union of Food Science and Technology
- Freedom From Hunger
- International Development Research Centre
- Codex Alimentarius
