= International Union of Food Science and Technology =

NGO based in Toronto

- Abbreviation: IUFoST
- Formation: 1962; 64 years ago
- Type: INGO
- Headquarters: Canada
- Region served: Worldwide
- Official language: English, French
- President: Aman Wirakartakusumah
- Parent organization: International Science Council (ISC)
- Website: www.iufost.org

The International Union of Food Science and Technology (IUFoST) (/ˈaɪjuːfɒst/ EYE-yoo-fost) is the global scientific organization and voice for food science and technology representing more than 300,000 food scientists, engineers and technologists through its work in more than 100 countries. It is a voluntary, non-profit association of national food science organizations. IUFoST is the only elected scientific representative of Food Science and Technology in the International Science Council (ISC), elected by its peers across scientific disciplines. It is the only global representative of food science and technology to notable organizations such as the World Health Organization (WHO), Food and Agriculture Organization (FAO) of the United Nations, United Nations Development Programme and (UNDP), CODEX Alimentarius.

== Background ==
The feasibility of establishing an international organization of food scientists and technologists dedicated to the nutritional needs of the people of the world was informally explored during the First International Congress of Food Science and Technology (1962) held in London. The President of the Congress was Lord Rank who crystallised informal discussions that had already been taking place among a number of food scientists from around the world when he stated in his presidential message: "If the potentialities of ... food science and technology are to ... culminate and nutritionally adequate, then there must be international collaboration." From the Congress emerged the International Committee of Food Science and Technology.

The work of this Committee culminated in the formal inauguration of the International Union of Food Science and Technology during the Third International Congress of Food Science and Technology convened in 1970 in Washington, DC, USA. The 1970 meeting in Washington, DC, USA was referred to as "SOS/70" with SOS referring to Science and Survival.

== NATO's Involvement in the Conception of IUFoST ==
In 1960, several British scientific societies and the UK Government organised a conference in London in recognition of the Centenary of the 1860 Food and Drugs Act (UK). It was also the 150th anniversary of Appert's publication on the preservation of foods in sealed containers.

In the week prior to the Food and Drugs conference, Professor John Hawthorn convened a symposium on Recent Advances in Food Science at the Glasgow Royal College of Science and Technology, which later metamorphosed into Strathclyde University. [The proceedings, edited by Professor Hawthorn and a colleague J. Muil Leitch, were published in 1962 by Butterworths]. The Glasgow symposium, to which food scientists from many nations were invited, was financed by a substantial grant from the Office of the Science Adviser to the North Atlantic Treaty Organization, NATO. During the 1950s and 1960s NATO evinced a significant interest in food technology. The food and nutrition research laboratory in Toronto, of which I was director, carried out an extensive study for NATO on the bulk storage of food grains examining alternative methods conducive to stockpiling at dispersed sites.

One evening following dinner during the Glasgow symposium, Professors Hawthorn and EC Bate-Smith invited a group to meet to discuss the concept of an international food science society. The discussion was splendidly stimulated by Professor Hawthorn's supply of malt whiskey from a Hebridean distillery. The group included Emil Mark and George Stewart from Davis, California, a fellow Canadian Bill Geddes, Dean of Agricultural Biochemistry at the University of Minnesota, Professor H D Kay from the dairy research institute at Reading, Tim Anson, an American employed with the Lever Organisation. Sadly I am the last survivor of that Glasgow group.

The notion of international scientific societies was not unique. ICSU, its predecessor and the supporting family of national academies and scientific unions had existed since 1919. The Glasgow group was of the opinion, however, that the time was ripe to create an international food science society, since several national food science and technology institutes were in existence. Our British hosts undertook to pursue the idea and the result was the food science congress convened in London in 1962, the first of the series of which China will be the host to the 14th.

The subsequent history of IUFoST is amply recorded in the archives, but perhaps not everyone is aware of NATO's early intervention.

By Joseph H. Hulse, Past President, IUFoST

== The Budapest Declaration ==
In response to a shift in research focus among food scientists and technologists towards combating chronic hunger problems in the less developed world, IUFoST released its ‘Budapest Declaration’ during its 9th General Assembly in Budapest, Hungary, 1995. Referencing the Joint FAO/WHO International Conference on Nutrition (Rome, 1992) and its World Declaration on Nutrition, IUFoST declared its determination to minimize hunger and to reduce all forms of malnutrition throughout the world. To do this, IUFoST declared its commitment to work with all other organisations to ensure sustained nutritional well-being for all people in a peaceful, just and environmentally safe world. The declaration further recognised the central role of food science and technology in ensuring the year-round availability of the quantity and variety of safe and wholesome foods necessary to meet the nutritional needs of the world's growing population. This declaration would guide IUFoST's working policy for the next fifteen years.

== The Cape Town Declaration ==
During 2010's 13th General Assembly of IUFoST in Cape Town, South Africa, the IUFoST General Assembly adopted the "Cape Town Declaration" setting out its commitments to food safety, food security and food science education. It recognized the previous work that had been conducted since the Budapest Declaration while outlining a policy for IUFoST future work with the global food science and technology industry.

== Programmes and Achievements: IUFoST Missions consist of ==
As the global food science and technology organization IUFoST has special consultative status with FAO. Similarly IUFoST works closely with related departments in the World Health Organization, United National International Development Organization (UNIDO), and many other international organisations in the course of 'strengthening food science and technology for humanity' • Stimulating exchange of knowledge in the international food science and technology community through the electronic magazine "The World of Food Science," the annual review of the state of global food science and technology, textbooks, world congress review papers and the Hunger Handbook applying food science and technology to improve nutrition and promote national development. IUFoST publishes the core food science and technology textbook for food science and technology, "Food Science and Technology", published by Wiley-Blackwell.

== IUFoST's Key Activities ==
The Biennial World Food Congress

IUFoST is holding its next World Food Congress in Rimini, Italy in 2024 from September 8 to September 12.

Involvement in regional symposia (2011-2012)

IUFOST is active in regional symposia across the globe. IUFoST Scientific Information Bulletins (SIBs)

== Disciplinary Groups ==
International specialist bodies form Disciplinary Groups under the IUFoST umbrella. These currently include the International Society of Food Engineers (ISFE), the International Society for Nutraceuticals and Functional Foods (ISNFF), the International Symposium on the Properties of Water (ISOPOW), the International Food Research Collaboration (IFRC) and the International Society of Food Applications of Nanoscale Sciences (ISFANS).

== Publications ==
- e-News in Brief
- Textbook, Food Science and Technology - Wiley Blackwell
- International Review of Food Science and Technology
- Lebensmittel-Wissenschaft & Technologie (lwt - food science and technology in (in German)), an official journal of IUFoST, published by Elsevier in Amsterdam.
- Trends in Food Science and Technology (TIFS) an official publisher of IUFoST (Elsevier)
- Nature Journal - Science of Food
- Food Control, an official publication of IUFoST
- Proceeding from over 200 scientific meetings published in book form, journal and also through electronic publishing

== IUFoST World Congresses ==
Nr.	Year	City	Country
22.	2024	Rimini	Italy
21.	2022	Singapore	Singapore
20.	2020	Auckland	New Zealand (cancelled due to pandemic)
19.	2018	Mumbai	India
18.	2016	Dublin	Ireland
17.	2014	Montreal	Canada
16.	2012	Foz do Iguassu	Brazil
15.	2010	Cape Town	South Africa
14.	2008	Shanghai	China
13.	2006	Nantes	France
12.	2003	Chicago, Illinois	United States
11.	2001	Seoul	South Korea
10.	1999	Sydney	Australia
9.	1995	Budapest	Hungary
8.	1991	Toronto	Canada
7.	1987	Singapore	Singapore
6.	1983	Dublin	Ireland
5.	1978	Kyoto	Japan
4.	1974	Madrid	Spain
3.	1970	Washington, DC	United States
2.	1966	Warsaw	Poland
1.	1962	London	United Kingdom

== Headquarters ==
The IUFoST secretariat is headquartered in Canada.
