= Ram Narain Agarwal =

Indian aerospace engineer (1940–2024)

Ram Narain Agarwal (1940 – 15 August 2024) was an Indian aerospace engineer, known for his contributions to the Agni series of surface-to-surface missiles. He is regarded as the "father of the Agni series of missiles" and the creative force behind Indian MIRV (Multiple Independently-targetable Reentry Vehicle) technology.

== Life and career ==
Agarwal was born to a family of traders in Jaipur, Rajasthan. He completed his masters in Aerospace engineering from Indian Institute of Science, Bangalore. Agarwal has worked as Program Director (AGNI) and as Director Advanced Systems Laboratory of the Defence Research and Development Organisation (DRDO).

== Death ==
Agarwal died on 15 August 2024, at the age of 84.

== Awards ==
- Padma Shri (1990)
- Padma Bhushan (2000)
