= Sandip University, Sijoul =

Private University in Bihar, India

- Type: State Private University
- Established: 2017
- Affiliations: UGC
- Chairman: Sandip N. Jha
- Chancellor: Nityanand Jha
- Vice-Chancellor: Dr. Arun Kumar Dwivedi
- Location: Sijoul, Madhubani, Bihar, India
- Website: sijoul.sandipuniversity.edu.in

Sandip University, Sijoul is a state private university located in Sijoul, Madhubani district, Bihar, India. The university was established in 2017 by Sandip Foundation under the Bihar Private Universities Act, 2013, one of the two first private universities in Bihar, the other being K. K. University. Both universities were approved by the Bihar Government in May 2017 following the passing of Private Universities (Amendment) Bill, 2017 in March 2017. The 2017 law relaxed the rules for establishment of private universities in Bihar, including the minimum premises area they were permitted to operate in (5,000 m²) before shifting to the place designated in the project report.. This decision gave autonomous status to what was previously the Sandip Foundation Sijoul campus which houses the Shri Nityanand Jha College of Education (SNJCOE) and the Shri Ram Polytechnic (SRP). This is the second university to be established by the foundation, following the establishment Sandip University, Nashik in 2015.

== Schools ==
- School of Engineering & Technology
- School of Computing Sciences & Engineering
- School of Commerce & Management Studies
- School of Sciences
- School of Education
