= Sandeep Joshi (Assam cricketer) =

Indian cricketer

Sandeep Joshi was an Indian cricketer. He was a right-handed batsman and leg-break bowler who played for Assam.

Joshi made a single one-day appearance for the team during the 1998–99 season, and, the following day, made his only first-class appearance, both games coming against Orissa.

In both games, Joshi finished not out, for 8 and 0 runs respectively.
