= Sandip Kumar Basu =

Indian molecular biologist

- Born: 1944 (age 81–82); Kolkata, West Bengal, India
- Years active: since 1975
- Awards: Padma Shri; Ranbaxy Medical Sciences Award; FICCI Life Sciences Award; Bhasin Foundation Biotechnology Award; ICMR B. R. Ambedkar Award; ISCA R. K. Dutt Memorial Award; Goyal Prize

Sandip Kumar Basu (born 1944) is an Indian molecular biologist and the holder of the J. C. Bose Chair of the National Academy of Sciences, India, who is credited with innovations in the treatment protocols of leishmaniasis, tuberculosis, viral infections, multidrug resistant cancer and arterosclerosis. He was honored by the Government of India, in 2001, with the fourth highest Indian civilian award of Padma Shri.

== Biography ==
Sandip Kumar Basu was born in Kolkata in the Indian state of West Bengal. He graduated in 1962 from the Presidency College, Calcutta and secured his master's degree in 1964 from the University College of Science. His doctoral research was at the Calcutta University which he successfully completed in 1968 on the topic, regulation of microbial metabolism and moved to USA for post doctoral research at Keck School of Medicine of USC, Los Angeles, University of California, Irvine School of Medicine, Public Health Research Institute, New York and Michael Reese Hospital, Chicago. In 1975, he started his professional career by joining the University of Texas Southwestern Medical School as a faculty member and stayed there till 1983 when he returned to India to join the Indian Institute of Chemical Biology, Kolkata. His next move was as the director of the Institute of Microbial Technology, Chandigarh in 1986. He became the director of the National Institute of Immunology, New Delhi in 1991, a post he held till 2005 when he became the Professor of Eminence of the institute and continued there till 2010. He is the J. C. Bose Chair Professor of the National Academy of Sciences, India, placed at the National Institute of Science Communication and Information Resources of the Council of Scientific and Industrial Research.

Basu has been involved with research on the receptor based intracellular delivery of drugs. He is known to have introduced a new approach of scavenger receptor-mediated targeting of therapeutic agents which has been demonstrated to be more effective than conventional chemotherapy, in the treatment of leishmaniasis, tuberculosis, viral infections, and multidrug resistant cancer. His research has led to the discovery of new drug targets and also demonstrated the therapeutic effect of immunomodulator muramyl dipeptide on salmonella by diverting the route the pathogens follow so as to survive within the macrophages. He is credited with the establishment of the pathway of low density lipoprotein receptors. It is reported that Basu's work assisted Michael Stuart Brown and Joseph L. Goldstein, 1985 Nobel Prize winners and his co-authors, in their research and in the development of statins, the cholesterol lowering drug.

Basu is also credited with administrative achievements such as the establishment of a permanent campus at the Institute of Microbial Technology, Chandigarh. A former member of the Scientific Advisory Committee to the Government of India, he has served as the council member of Indian National Science Academy, the Indian Academy of Sciences and National Academy of Sciences, India and has also been the general secretary and vice president of NASI.

== Awards and honors ==
Sandip Kumar Basu is an elected Fellow of the Indian National Science Academy, the Indian Academy of Sciences (FASc), The World Academy of Sciences (FTWAS), and the National Academy of Sciences, India (FNASc). He delivered the Professor MRN Prasad Memorial Award Lecture in 1995, the Dr. Yellapragada SubbaRow Memorial Award Lecture in 2002 and the B. K. Bachhawat Award Lecture in 2006. He received the Ranbaxy Medical Sciences Award in 1995 followed by FICCI Life Sciences Award in 1996 and Bhasin Foundation Biotechnology Award, the next year. The year 1999 brought him two awards, the B. R. Ambedkar Award of the Indian Council of Medical Research and the R. K. Dutt Memorial Award of the International Science Congress Associations. A recipient of the Goyal Prize in 2003, Basu was awarded the civilian honour of Padma Shri by the Government of India in 2001.

== See also ==
- Michael Stuart Brown
- Joseph L. Goldstein
