= Central Food Technological Research Institute =

Food technology research lab in India

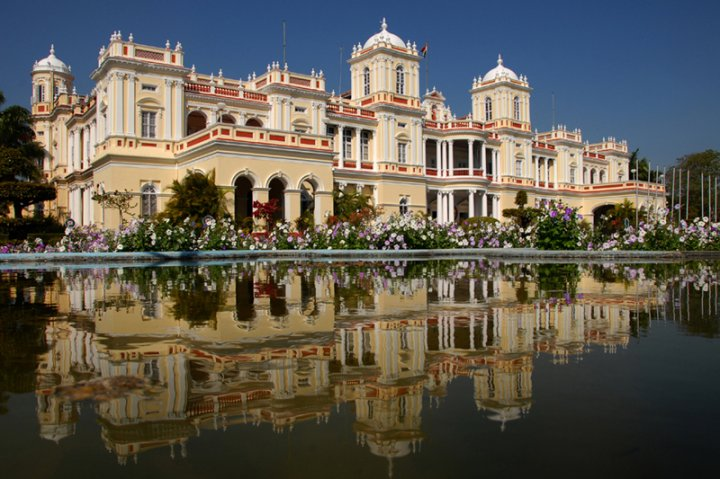
- Main facade of Cheluvambavilas Palace at Mysore, India, the headquarters of CFTRI
- Established: October 21, 1950; 75 years ago
- Research type: A constituent laboratory of CSIR, India
- Director: Dr. Giridhar Parvatam
- Location: Mysuru, Karnataka
- Campus: 200 acres (0.81 km^{2})
- Operating agency: CSIR
- Website: cftri.res.in

The Central Food Technological Research Institute (CFTRI) is an Indian food research institute and laboratory headquartered in Mysore, India. It is a constituent laboratory of the Council of Scientific and Industrial Research.

India is the world's second largest food grain, fruit and vegetable producer, and the institute is engaged in research in the production and handling of grains, pulses, oilseed, along with spices, fruits, vegetables, meat, fish, and poultry.

== Establishment ==
CFTRI was established on 21 October 1950, soon after the Dominion of India was constituted into a republic, under the Council of Scientific and Industrial Research, a research and development organisation co-founded by Sir A. R. Mudaliyar.

Maharaja Jayachamaraja Wadiyar donated Cheluvambavilas Palace and its vast campus to house the institute, where it is headquartered. It also has its resource centres at Hyderabad, Lucknow, and Mumbai, rendering technical assistance to numerous entrepreneurs.

== Institute ==
The institute has nearly two hundred scientists, technologists, and engineers, and over a hundred technicians, skilled workers, and support staff. There are sixteen research and development departments, including laboratories focussing on food engineering, food biotechnology, microbiology, grain sciences, sensory science, biochemistry, molecular nutrition, and food safety. It is a major hub of bioNEST scheme of Govt of India under BIRAC(Biotechnology Industry Research Assistance Council)

The institute has developed over 300 products, processes, and equipment designs, and most of these technologies have been released to over 4000 licensees for commercial application. The institute develops technologies to increase efficiency and reduce post-harvest losses, add convenience, increase export, find new sources of food products, integrate human resources in food industries, reduce costs, and modernise. It holds several patents and has published findings in reputed journals.

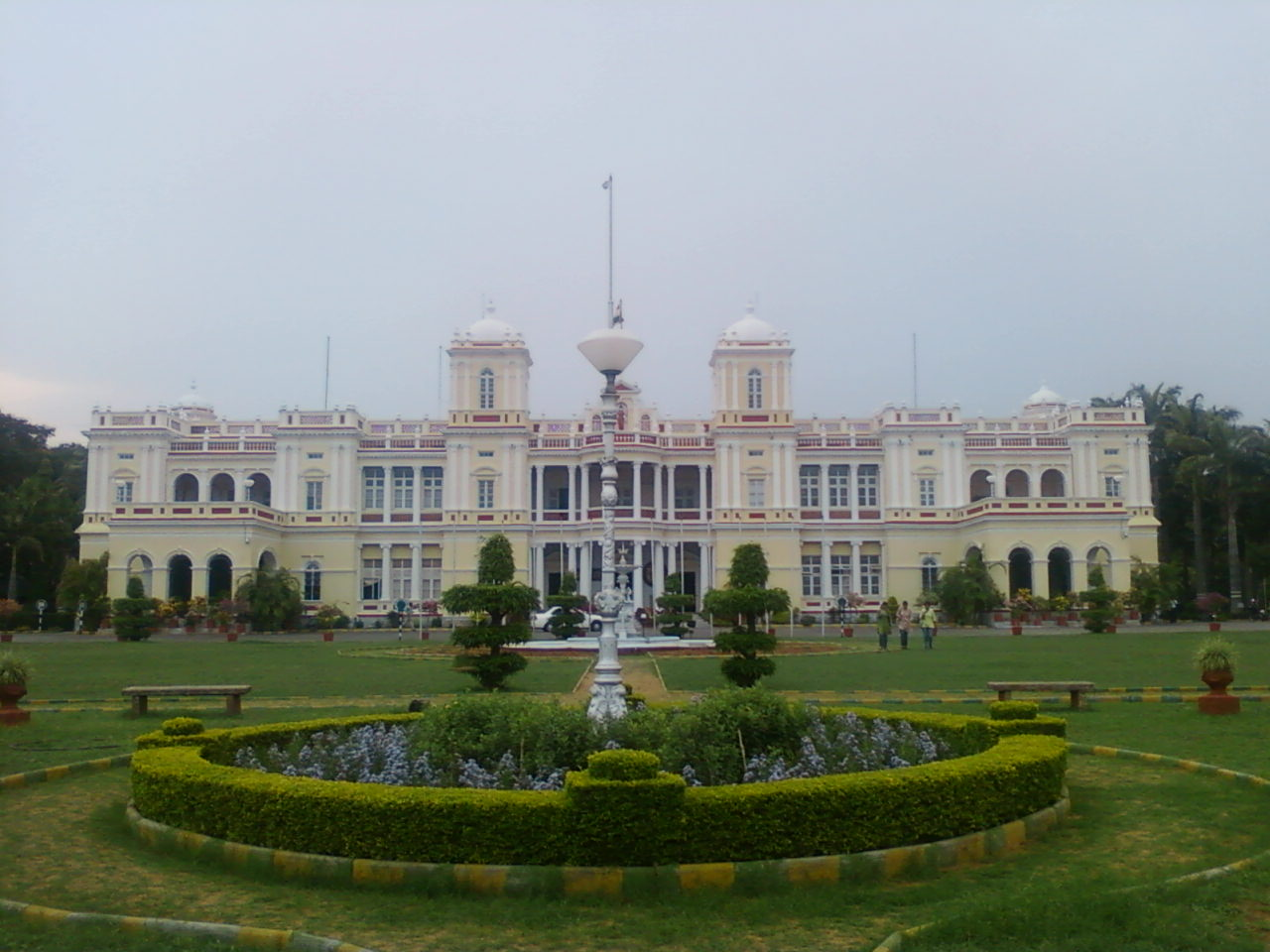
A view of Cheluvambavilas Palace on a winter morning fog

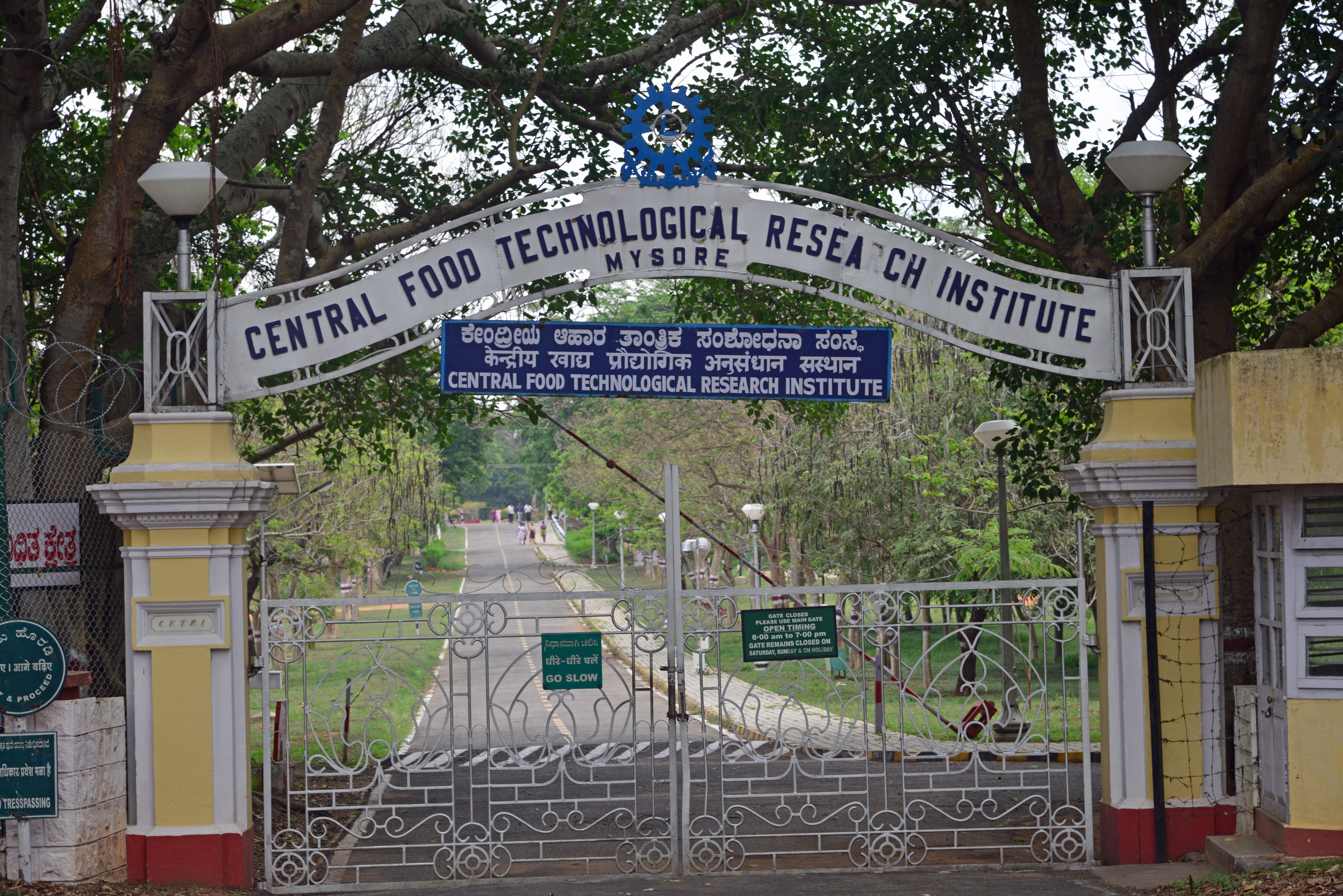
The main gate

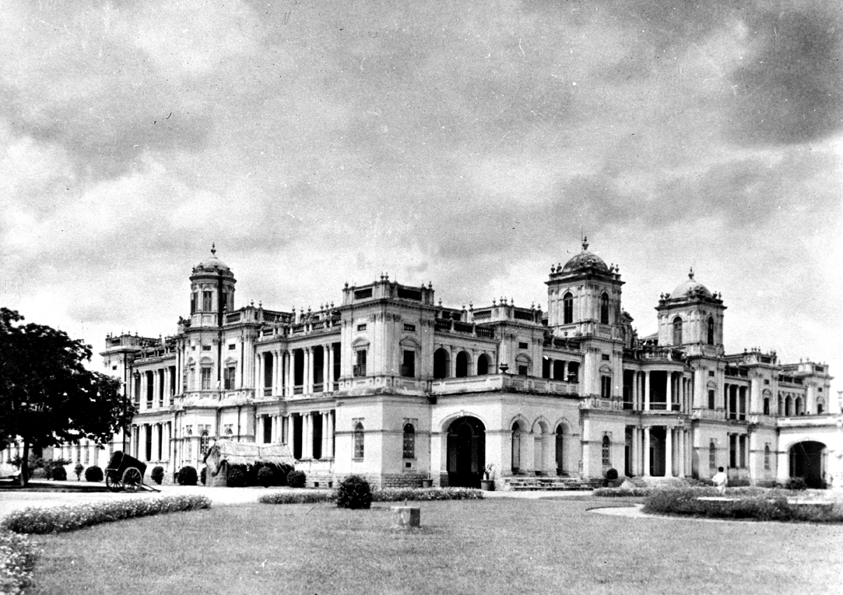
The palace in 1951

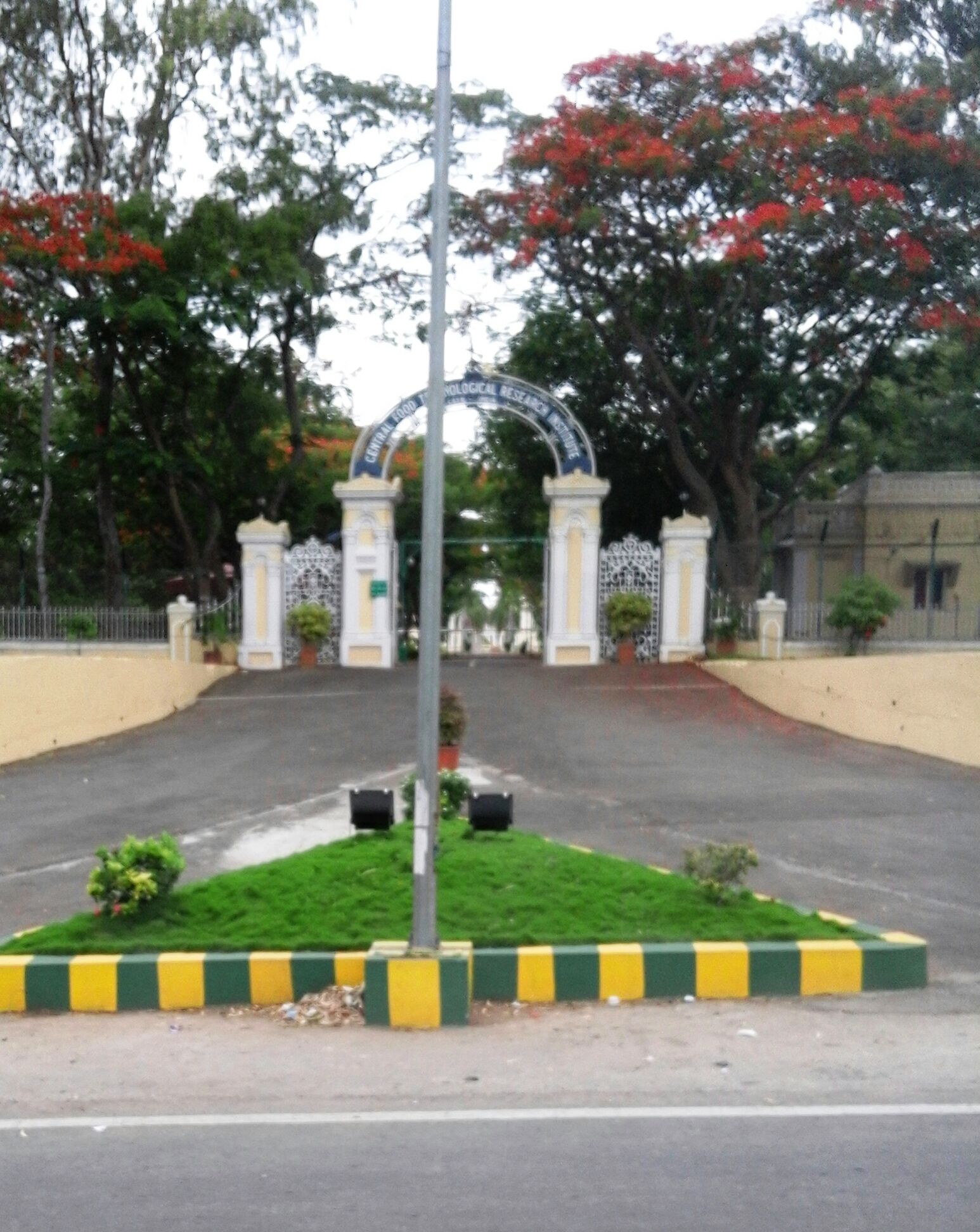
The gate facing Mysore Railway Station
