= List of IIT (BHU) Varanasi people =

This is a list of notable alumni and faculty of Indian Institute of Technology (BHU) Varanasi.

== Notable alumni ==
=== Business ===
Name	Notability	Degree and Class Year	References
Nikesh Arora	CEO at Palo Alto Networks, former president at Softbank, ex-Senior Vice President and Chief Business Officer at Google	B.tech (Electrical), 1989	
Anil Chakravarthy	President, Customer Experience Orchestration Business at Adobe Inc.	B.tech (Computer Science), 1989	
Deepak Ahuja	Former CFO at Tesla, Inc.	B.tech (Ceramic), 1985	
Jay Chaudhry	CEO and Founder of ZScalar	B.tech (Electronics)	
Ram Charan (consultant)	Renowned management consultant and Global Indian of the Year 2010 by Economic Times	B.tech (Mechanical)	
Sahu Ramesh Chandra Jain	Former Executive Director of Bennett, Coleman & Co. Ltd., Chairman of Press Trust of India and the Indian Newspaper Society and the only person to edit both The Times of India and Navbharat Times	B.Sc. (Industrial Chemistry)	
Vinod Kumar Bansal	Indian educationist and founder of Bansal Classes at Kota, a test preparation company	B.tech (Mechanical)	
Sanjay Sethi	Co-founder and CEO of ShopClues, a Gurgaon-based online marketplace for unbranded goods	B.tech (Mechanical), 1983	
Bhupendra Kumar Modi	Chairman of Smart Group and Singapore-based India business conglomerate Spice Global	B.tech (Chemical)	
Late Krishan Kumar Modi	Former chairman, Modi Group		
Salil Prabhakar	President and CEO, Delta ID Inc.	B.tech (Computer Science), 1996	
Late Sadhan Dutt	Founder-chairman of Development Consultants, a member of the Kuljian Group of Companies	B.tech	
Anirudh Mishra	Entrepreneur and owner of IMR resources, a global company headquartered in Switzerland.	B.Tech(Civil),1986	His company IMR group has an annual turnover of over $3 billion.
Vinod Kumar Menon	CEO&Whole time director of IRB Infrasturcture Pvt Ltd.	BTech(Civil),1986	He heads the largest private infra company in India.Market Cap of over ₹55,000 Crore.
Raj Yavatkar	CTO of Juniper Networks	BTech(Electronics)	Former fellow of Intel and VMware and current CTO of Juniper Networks, a $14 Billion, high end core routing and AI company
Bimlendra Jha	Former MD and CEO of Ambuja Cements and former CEO of Tata Steel UK.	BTech(Ceramic),1990	

=== Politics and civil services ===
Name	Notability	Degree and Class Year	References
Late Krishan Kant	Former vice-president of India, Governor of Andhra Pradesh (1990–97), member of Lok Sabha from Chandigarh (1977–80), and Member of Rajya Sabha from Haryana (1966–1972, 1972–1977)	M.Sc. (Chemical)	
Manoj Sinha	2nd Lieutenant Governor of Jammu and Kashmir and Former Minister of State, Railways and Communication.	B.tech, M.tech (Civil)	
Late Ashok Singhal	former president, Vishva Hindu Parishad	B.tech (Metallurgy), 1950	
Late Ved Prakash Goyal	Former Treasurer of the Bharatiya Janata Party and Union Minister of Shipping		
Rajiv Dogra	Indian diplomat, author and commentator. Former Indian Ambassador to Italy and Romania and Consul General to Karachi, Pakistan	B.tech (Electronics), 1969	
Tribhuvan Ram	Indian politician and member of the Sixteenth Legislative Assembly of Uttar Pradesh as a Bahujan Samaj Party candidate representing Ajagara constituency of Uttar Pradesh	B.tech	
Ajoy Mehta	Chief Secretary of Maharashtra, Former Municipal Commissioner of Mumbai	B.tech	
Indu Bhushan	First CEO of Ayushman Bharat	B.tech (Electrical), 1981	
R.N. Parbat	IRS and retired member of Central Board of direct taxes	B.Tech(Civil),1986	About him

=== Science and technology ===
Name	Notability	Degree and Class Year	References
Naresh Chandra Murmu	Director at Central Mechanical Engineering Research Institute and Dean (Engineering Sciences) at Academy of Scientific and Innovative Research.	PhD (2010)	
Thomas Anantharaman	One of the 3-member team at IBM who developed IBM Deep Blue supercomputer.		
Pulickel Ajayan	Pioneering scientist in the field of carbon nanotubes	B.tech (Metallurgy), 1985	
Kota Harinarayana	Padma Shri awardee, Programme director and chief designer of India's Light Combat Aircraft (LCA) Tejas Programme.	B.tech (Mechanical), 1964	
Late Narla Tata Rao	Padma Shri awardee. Doyen of power sector in India, played a pivotal role in development of NTPC and PowerGrid Corporation of India		
Late Patcha Ramachandra Rao	Renowned Metallurgist, Shanti Swarup Bhatnagar Prize recipient and former vice chancellor of Benaras Hindu University	Ph.D, 1968	
Shrikant Lele	Renowned Metallurgist, Shanti Swarup Bhatnagar Prize recipient and former director of IIT BHU	Ph.D, 1968	
Palle Rama Rao	Renowned scientist. Padma Shri, Padma Bhushan and Padma Vibhushan awardee	Ph.D. (Metallurgy)	
Akhlesh Lakhtakia	Charles Godfrey Binder (Endowed) Professor at Penn State University, USA. and pioneer of sculptured thin films	B.tech (Electronics), 1979	
N. Ravishankar	Materials scientist, Shanti Swarup Bhatnagar laureate	B.tech (Metallurgy), 1991	
Laxmikant Kale	Professor of computer science at the University of Illinois at Urbana-Champaign	B.tech (Electrical), 1977	
Bir Bhanu	Electronics Engineering, Bourns Presidential Chair in Engineering and Distinguished Professor of Electrical and Computer EngineeringUniversity of California, Riverside, California	B.Tech. 1972	
Madisetti Anant Ramlu	Founder and first Head of the Department of Mining Engineering at IIT Kharagpur	B.tech Mining and Metallurgy	
Kamanio Chattopadhyay	Materials engineer, Shanti Swarup Bhatnagar Prize recipient, best known for his discovery of decagonal nanoquantum quasicrystals	M.tech and Ph.D.	
Suhas Pandurang Sukhatme	Padma Shri awardee and former chairman of the Atomic Energy Regulatory Board of the Government of India	B.tech (Mechanical), 1958	
Unnikrishna Pillai	Professor of electrical engineering at the New York University Tandon School of Engineering	B.tech (Electronics), 1977	
Pradeep Rohatgi	Distinguished professor at University of Wisconsin-Milwaukee, world leader in the field of composite materials, particularly metal matrix composites.	B.tech (Metallurgy), 1961	
Nikku Madhusudhan	Professor of Astrophysics and Exoplanetary Science at the Institute of Astronomy, University of Cambridge. He is credited with developing the technique of atmospheric retrieval to infer the compositions of exoplanets.	B.Tech (Mining)	
Anil Bhardwaj	Indian astrophysicist, Director of the Physical Research Laboratory, Government of India	Ph.D., 1992	
Sandeep Verma	Endowed Professor in the Department of Chemistry at the Indian Institute of Technology, Kanpur	M.tech, 1989	
K.A. Padmanabhan	Former Director of Indian Institute of Technology Kanpur (IIT Kanpur) and a former dean, academic research, IIT Madras	B.tech (Metallurgy), 1968	
Sachchida Nand Tripathi	Arjun Dev Joneja Faculty Chair at IIT Kanpur	B.tech, 1992	
Prem Jain	Father of Green Buildings in India	B.Sc. (Mechanical), 1952	
V.K. Raina	World-renowned bridge engineer, author, and Technical Advisor to the United Nations.	BTech(Civil)	

=== Other Academia ===
Name	Notability	Degree and Class Year	References
Dan Gode	Clinical Associate Professor of Accounting, Taxation, and Business law at New York University Stern School of Business	B.tech (Electrical), 1986	
Pankaj Chandra	Vice Chancellor, Ahmedabad University and former director, Indian Institute of Management Bangalore	B.tech 1983	
Devesh Kapur	Director of Asia Programs and Starr Foundation Professor of South Asian Studies at The Johns Hopkins University School of Advanced International Studies	B.tech (Chemical), 1983	

=== Arts ===
Name	Notability	Degree and Class Year	References
Varun Grover	National Film Award-winning Lyricist and Songwriter. Famous for writing the songs of Gangs of Wasseypur	B.tech (Civil), 2003	
Manick Sorcar	Award-winning artist and animator		
Nikhil Sachan	Indian author and columnist	B.tech (Electronics), 2009	
Puneet Krishna	Indian Author and Screen Writer and creator of famous 1 & 2 season of popular TV series Mirzapur, CA Topper	B.tech, 1998	

=== Humanities and society ===
Name	Notability	Degree and Class Year	References
Late Veer Bhadra Mishra	Professor, founder of Sankat Mochan Foundation and was a TIME Magazines "Hero of the Planet" recipient in 1999 for his work related to cleaning of the Ganges		
Sandeep Pandey	Ramon Magsaysay awardee who started the Asha for Education foundation		
Satinath Sarangi	Activist and founder and manager of Sambhavna Trust (a charitable trust for Bhopal disaster victims)		
Amartya Talukdar	Blogger and advocate of men's rights in the fields of alimony, dowry and marriage	M.tech (Mechanical)	

=== Others ===
Name	Notability	Degree and Class Year	References
Prem Saran Satsangi	Leader of Radhasoami Faith, Dayalbagh, Chairman ACE, DEI. Noted System Scientist and Physicist. (Ex Dean IIT Delhi, Ex Vice-Chancellor, Dayalbagh Educational Institute)		
Satyendra Dubey	former Assistant Project Director at the National Highways Authority of India who was murdered after exposing corruption		

== Notable faculty ==
Name	Notability	Term	References
Shrikant Lele	Shanti Swarup Bhatnagar laureate and former director of the institute from 2002 to 2005	Director, 2002–05	
Late Veer Bhadra Mishra	former professor of Civil Engineering; environmentalist; founder of Swatcha Ganga Campaign		
Palle Rama Rao	Renowned scientist. Padma Shri, Padma Bhushan and Padma Vibhushan awardee	1962-82	
Kamanio Chattopadhyay	Materials engineer, Shanti Swarup Bhatnagar Prize recipient, best known for his discovery of decagonal nanoquantum quasicrystals	Lecturer, 1975–78	
Prof. B. Mishra	Head of Department of Pharmaceutical Engineering & Technology and has published about 247 papers in peer-reviewed international & national journals. He has 3 patents, 6111 citations to his credit. He has been recognized as among the top 2% of the world's most-cited scientists by the prestigious Stanford University, on the basis of standardized citation indicators like information on citations, h-index, co-authorship, and a composite indicator.		
M.S. Muthu	An associate professor from the Department of Pharmaceutical Engineering & Technology, notable contribution in the nanomedicine, theranostics for cancer. He is among the top 2% scientists in the world list compiled by Stanford University.	2016-on going	
Ajit Kumar Chaturvedi	Former director of IIT Roorkee	1994-1996	
Ajit Ram Verma	Former director of the National Physical Laboratory, SS Bhatnagar Prize awardee	1959-65	
