= Vaibhav Taneja =

Chief financial officer of Tesla

- Born: 1977/1978 (age 48–49); India
- Education: Mata Jai Kaur Public School; Delhi University (BCom)
- Occupations: Chief financial officer and Chief accounting officer at Tesla

Vaibhav Taneja is an Indian-American executive and accountant who is currently serving as chief financial officer of Tesla, Inc., since 2023. He is also the company's chief accounting officer and one of the directors of Tesla India Motors and Energy Private Limited.

== Early life and education ==
Taneja was born in India and completed his schooling from Mata Jai Kaur Public School in New Delhi in 1996. Then he completed his undergraduate degree of Bachelor of Commerce from Delhi University in 1999. He qualified as a chartered accountant from the Institute of Chartered Accountants of India in 2000. He is also a Certified Public Accountant.

== Career ==
From July 1999 to March 2016, Taneja worked for PwC in India and the United States, ultimately holding the role of senior manager in assurance. In 2016, he joined SolarCity as its corporate controller.

In February 2017, Taneja joined Tesla, Inc. when SolarCity was acquired, as its assistant corporate controller. In May 2018, he was promoted to corporate controller. In March 2019, Taneja became the chief accounting officer, replacing Dave Morton. He was also made the director of Tesla India Motors and Energy Private Limited based in Bangalore in January 2021. In August 2023, he succeeded Zach Kirkhorn as the chief financial officer.

== Compensation ==
Taneja garnered significant attention when his compensation details were revealed in May 2025. Taneja received $139 million (~₹11,507,774,000) in 2024, which notably exceeded the pay of top tech leaders such as Microsoft's Satya Nadella ($79.1 million; ~₹6,548,668,000) and Google's Sundar Pichai ($10.73 million; ~₹888,334,000) in 2024. This substantial sum encompasses various forms of compensation beyond direct salary. Taneja's basic salary at Tesla was $400,000 (~₹33,116,000); the remainder consisted of stock options and equity linked to performance metrics.

== See also ==
- Deepak Ahuja — former CFO of Tesla (2017–19)
- Kevan Parekh — CFO of Apple Inc.
