= Bhogabir =

Bhogabir is a very large colony situated near Banaras Hindu University, in Varanasi in the state of Uttar Pradesh, India. It is near the very famous Sankat Mochan Hanuman Temple.

This colony named after the holy god bhogababa whose temple is also situated here. The colony has the largest water tank in the nearby area (capacity around 500000 lts).
