= Madaswamy S. Muthu =

Pharmaceutical engineer

M.S. Muthu
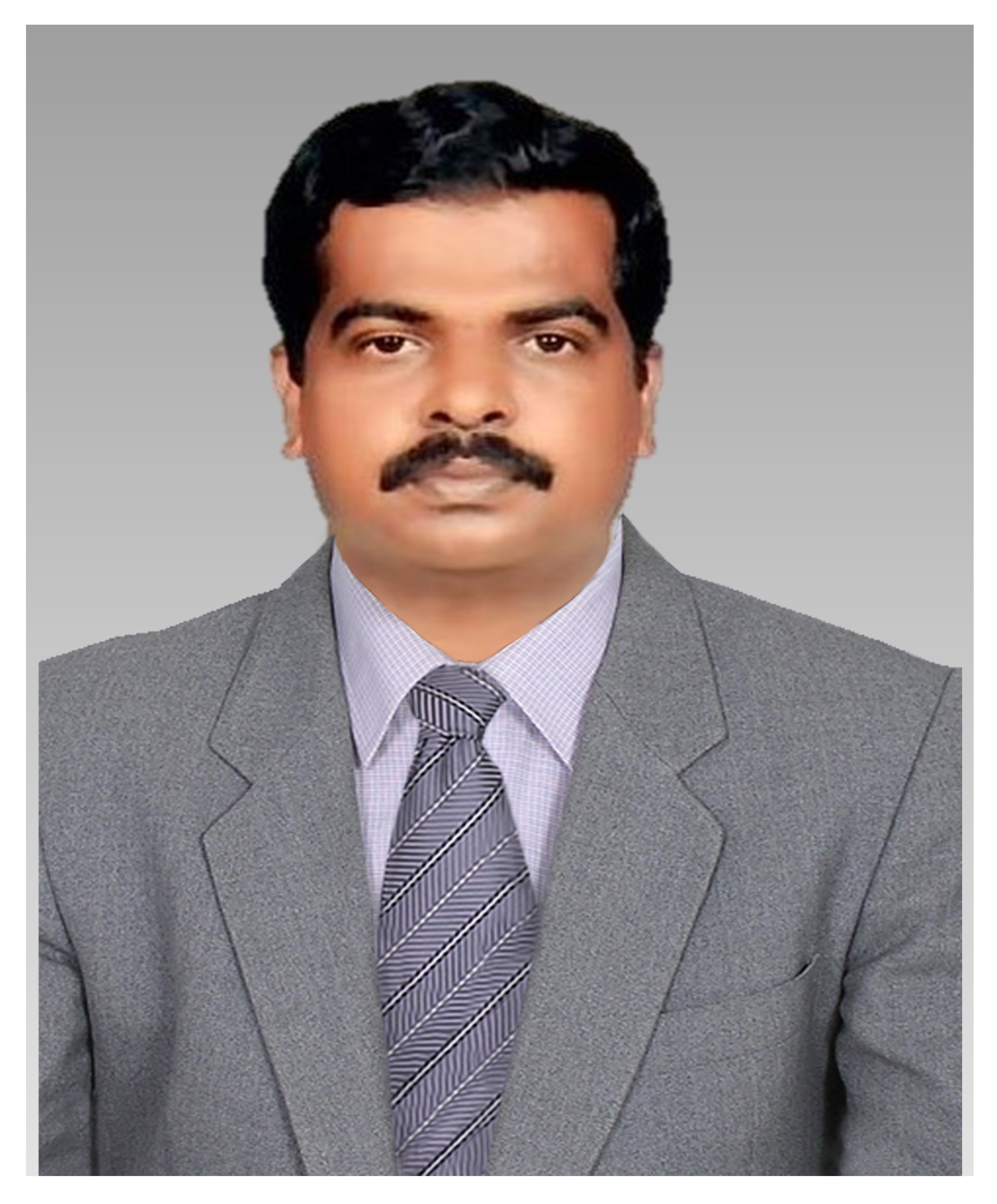
- Born: 20 July 1981 (age 45); India
- Education: Indian Institute of Technology (BHU), BITS-Pilani
- Known for: Cancer nanotechnology, Targeted drug delivery, Theranostics
- Scientific career
- Workplaces: Indian Institute of Technology (BHU), Varanasi, India
- Website: iitbhu.ac.in/dept/phe/people/msmuthuphe

M.S. Muthu (born 20 July 1981) is a Pharmaceutical engineer, Scientist, Inventor and one of the twenty Institute Professors at the Department of Pharmaceutical Engineering and Technology, Indian Institute of Technology (BHU), Varanasi, India. His research focuses on targeted nanomedicine, cancer theranostics, thrombolysis, and advanced drug delivery systems, with emphasis on translational and clinically relevant nanotechnologies.

== Education and Early Career ==
Dr. Muthu completed his Bachelor of Pharmacy (2002) from S.B. College of Pharmacy, Tamil Nadu, and his Master of Pharmacy (2004) from the Faculty of Pharmacy, Birla Institute of Technology and Science, Pilani. He earned his Ph.D. (2009) from the Department of Pharmaceutical Engineering and Technology, IIT (BHU), Varanasi under the supervision of Prof. Sanjay Singh. He subsequently pursued his post-doctoral research in cancer nanotechnology at the Department of Chemical and Biomolecular Engineering, Faculty of Engineering under the supervision of Prof. Feng Si-Shen from the National University of Singapore in 2010 & 2014 (2yrs).

== Research and Scientific Contributions ==
With over 18 years of academic and research experience, Prof. Muthu is a leading contributor to pharmaceutical nanotechnology and theranostics. His research lies at the interface of nanomaterials engineering and biomedical applications, particularly surface-modified polymers, polymer–ligand conjugates, and targeted nanoformulations.

His major research areas include:

- Cancer nanomedicine and nanotheranostics
- Targeted drug delivery for brain, breast, and lung cancers
- Nanoparticulate systems for thrombolysis
- Theranostic nanomedicine for tuberculosis
- Advanced wound-healing biomaterials

He is a widely recognized and cited researcher in drug delivery especially in the fields of nanotechnology and theranostics. He has published over 150 peer-reviewed research articles, book chapters, and reviews, accumulating more than 7,300 citations with an H-index of 46 (Scopus). His work has appeared in high-impact journals including Advanced Functional Materials, Theranostics, Biomaterials, and Carbohydrate Polymers. His research work is mainly focused on targeted nanomedicine and/or nanotheranostic drug delivery of anti-cancer agents, antipsychotics, antithrombotics and antimicrobials. He is an editor in chief for the international peer-reviewed journal ''Research & Reviews: Journal of Pharmacology and Toxicological Studies''. Additionally, he is the editorial board member of the "Diagnostics and Therapeutics" Journal published by Luminescience press is based in Hong Kong with offices in Wuhan and Xi’an, China. He is among the top 2% scientist globally, list compiled by the Stanford University. His profile has been listed at the 6th rank in IIT BHU as per Adscientific index.

Prof. Muthu holds five Indian patents and has led multiple government- and industry-funded research projects as Principal Investigator and Co-Principal Investigator, securing over ₹3.5 crore in competitive research funding from agencies such as DBT, DST, ICMR, SERB, and BIRAC.

Recently, he has developed targeted nanomedicine for breast cancer therapy with reduced systemic toxicity, which has successfully demonstrated its efficacy in preclinical studies.

== Awards and honors ==
Dr. Muthu received various scientific awards from government and non-government organization including the Academic Excellence Award, CREST Award, IMS-Research Publication Award, International Faculty Award etc. He is the recipient of the BIRAC-DBT-Gandhian Young Technological Innovation (GYTI) Award in 2017, from the President of India for advancing nanomedicine research. He has been elected as a Member of the National Academy of Sciences (NASI), India in 2019. Additionally, he is a fellow of the Royal Society of Chemistry (FRSC).

Dr. Muthu has received more than twelve major national and international awards, including:

- BOYSCAST Fellowship (2010), Department of Science and Technology, India
- DBT-CREST Award (2014), Department of Biotechnology, India
- Vice-Chancellor’s Medical Research Award (2014), Banaras Hindu University
- Best Young Scientist Award (2016)

He was ranked among the top 2% of scientists globally in lists compiled by Stanford University (2021–2024) and placed among the top 0.5% of pharmacy scholars worldwide by ScholarGPS (USA) in 2025.

== Academic Leadership and Service ==
Prof. Muthu has supervised doctoral, post-doctoral, postgraduate, and undergraduate researchers, contributing to academic mentorship and workforce development in pharmaceutical sciences. He has served in several academic leadership roles at IIT (BHU), including departmental coordination, curriculum development, and postgraduate governance.

He is a reviewer for leading international journals such as Biomaterials, Journal of Controlled Release, Molecular Pharmaceutics, and International Journal of Pharmaceutics. He also serves as Editor-in-Chief of Research and Reviews: Pharmacology and Toxicology Studies and is associated with multiple international editorial boards.

== Professional Affiliations ==
He is a lifetime member of:

- Pharmacy Council of India
- National Academy of Sciences, India
- American Nano Society
- British Society for Nanomedicine
- Royal Society of Chemistry

== Selected Recognition and Invited Lectures ==
Dr. Muthu has delivered invited lectures and keynote addresses at national and international conferences across India, Europe, and Asia, including scientific meetings on nanotheranostics, pharmaceutical biotechnology, and advanced drug delivery systems. He has also participated in leadership development programs organized by national science academies and policy institutions.
