= Veer Bhadra Mishra =

Personal details
- Born: 10 January 1939 Benares, Benares State, British India
- Died: 13 March 2013 (aged 74) Varanasi
- Website: sankatmochanfoundationonline.org

Veer Bhadra Mishra was the founding president of the Sankat Mochan Foundation.

== Career ==
He was a former professor of Hydraulic engineering and former Head of the Civil Engineering Department at the Indian Institute of Technology (BHU) Varanasi. He was also the Mahant (High Priest) of the Sankat Mochan Hanuman temple, Varanasi at Varanasi founded by poet-saint Goswami Tulsidas. Mishra was recognized on the United Nations Environment Programme's (UNEP) "Global 500 Roll of Honour" in 1992, and was a TIME Magazines "Hero of the Planet" recipient in 1999 for his work related to cleaning of the Ganges through the Sankat Mochan Foundation. He was a member of the National Ganga River Basin Authority (NGRBA) under Ministry of Environment, Govt. of India, which was set up in 2009, by the Government of India as an empowered planning, financing, monitoring and coordinating authority for the Ganges, in exercise of the powers conferred under the Environment (Protection) Act, 1986.

Mishra was conferred the title "Gangaikkaavalan", meaning the 'Protector of Ganga' on 21 August 2006 by the DRBCCC Hindu College, Pattabiram, Chennai-72, Tamil Nadu. On the occasion he was also decorated with a coronet of golden lotus, as per the Sangam Tamil tradition.

Mishra was awarded the prestigious "SaMaPa Vitasta Award 2009" in Delhi by "Sopori Academy of Music And Performing Arts" for his lifetime contribution and service to Indian music and culture.
