= Satinath Sarangi =

Indian human rights activist

Satinath (Sathyu) Sarangi was born in Chakradharpur, Jharkhand, India, on 25 September 1954. Since 1984 he has lived in Bhopal. Sarangi has been involved with the multiple activities run by a network of local, national, and international groups, pursuing health and economic needs, fighting legal claims, providing medical support, and working to ensure remembrance of the Bhopal disaster of 1984. Sarangi is the founder of several activist organizations and is also the founder and manager of Sambhavna Trust.

== Studies ==
Educational Qualification: Master of Technology (M Tech) (Metallurgical Engineering), Indian Institute of Technology (Banaras Hindu University), Varanasi. He enrolled for Ph.D. in 1980 but dropped out in 1984.

== Activism before 1984 ==
Sarangi's work as a campaigner started early as he became involved in various campaigns including indigenous people's struggle for self-determination in Bihar and the Society of Social Workers, students involved in organizing low-caste agricultural workers.

== Activism in Bhopal ==
Sarangi arrived in Bhopal the next day after the Bhopal disaster, when on the night of 2–3 December 1984 the gas was released. He immediately started exposing the issues of health care and defending the rights of the victims. Thus, he had to deal with the violence of the police and authorities. When other activists left Bhopal, he stood by. Being well-educated, he supported the victims, their organizations, and unions.

In December 1984, he was one of the founders of Zahareeli Gas Kand Sangharsh Morcha (Poisonous Gas Episode Struggle Front), an organization of survivors of the Union Carbide in the Bhopal disaster. In 1986, he founded the Bhopal Group for Information and Action (BGIA). In 1989, he made a campaign tour to the US, UK, Ireland, and The Netherlands.

He was a member of the organizing committee for the Bhopal session of the Permanent Peoples' Tribunal on Industrial and Environmental Hazards and Human Rights in 1992, and the National Organizing Secretary for the International Medical Commission on Bhopal in 1994.

== Awards ==
- The University Gold medal for topping M Tech exam.
- The Distinguished Alumnus Award, Department of Metallurgical Engineering, BHU 2008.
- Honorary graduate/Ph.D. at Queen Margaret University, Edinburgh 2009.
- Ground Zero Patriot, Tehelka magazine, 2009.
- Man of the year, The Week Magazine 2010.
- Award of Excellence 2010–11, Association of IT-BHU Alumni, New Delhi.
- The Sambhavna Trust was awarded the Japanese Tajiri Muneaki prize in 1999, the national ‘Inner Flame Award’ for outstanding humanitarian work in 2001, the international Margaret Mead Award in 2002, and the International Regenerative Health Care Award from CleanMed 2009/Health Care Without Harm (HCWH), USA in 2009

== Publications ==
- S. Sarangi, T. Zaidi, R.K. Pal, D. Katgara, V. G. Gadag, S. Mulay, and D.R. Varma, Effects of Exposure of Parents to Toxic Gases in Bhopal on the Offspring. American Journal of Industrial Medicine;53(8):836-41, 2010
- Satinath Sarangi. Global Industrial Disaster, National State Failure and Local Self-provision of Health Care. Global Social Policy, Vol. 9(3): pp 316–318; 2009
- Barn, S. Mulay, S. Sarangi; The Bhopal Gas Disaster twenty five years later British Columbia Centre for Disease Control, Vancouver, BC, Canada, Memorial University of Newfoundland, St. John's, NL, Canada, Sambhavna Trust Clinic, Bhopal, India 2009-A-246-ISES Minneapolis, 1–5 November 2009
- Daya R Varma, Ritesh Pal, Diana Katgara, Satinath Sarangi, Tasneem Zaidi, Steven Holleran, Rajashekhar Ramakrishnan and Shree Mulay. Catch-up growth in males affected by the Union Carbide disaster of 1984 in Bhopal, India. The Journal of the Federation of American Societies for Experimental Biology 22:1137.1, 2008
- Bridget Hanna, Ward Morehouse, Satinath Sarangi (2005) The Bhopal Reader, Other India Press, Goa, India and The Apex Press, New York, USA
- Satinath Sarangi, Medical Crime, Seminar 544, New Delhi, December 2004
- Nishant Ranjan, Satinath Sarangi, V. T. Padmanabhan, Steve Holleran, Rajasekhar Ramakrishnan and Daya R. Varma (October 2003). "Methyl isocyanate exposure and growth patterns of adolescents in Bhopal" (PDF). JAMA. 290 (14): 1856–7. doi:10.1001/jama.290.14.1856. PMID 14532313.
- Satinath Sarangi: The Bhopal aftermath: generations of women affected. Silent Invaders - Pesticides, Livelihoods and Women's Health, Edited by Miriam Jacobs and Barbara Dinham, Zed Books, London 2003
- Satinath Sarangi: Le de'sastre impuni de Bhopal, Pour Que Vive La Terre, Edited by Roger Cans and Benoit Hopquin, EPA-Hachette Livre, 2003
- Sarangi, Satinath (Fall 2002). "Crimes of Bhopal and the Global Campaign for Justice". Social Justice. 29 (3). Archived from the original on 13 September 2015 – via Questia.
- Barbara Dinham and Satinath Sarangi: The Bhopal gas tragedy-1984 to? The evasion of corporate responsibility, Environment and Urbanization IIED, London, Vol. 14 No. 1, April 2002
- Sarangi S: An industrial disaster becomes a medical nightmare. Issues in Medical Ethics. Vol. 9, No. 3, July–September 2001, Mumbai, India.
- Sarangi Satinath: Bhopal Gas Tragedy. India Disasters Report - Towards a Policy Initiative, Edited by Parasuraman S, Unnikrishnan P. V. Oxford University Press, New Delhi, 2000
- Satinath Sarangi, The Movement in Bhopal and Its Lessons, Environmental Victims, Edited by Christopher Williams, Earthscan Publications Limited, London, 1998
- Satinath Sarangi, "Health Care Plan for Bhopal Disaster Survivors, Going Nowhere" Economic and Political Weekly, XXXIII:16, 18 April 883–84, Mumbai, India, 1998.
- Satinath Sarangi, "Toxic Legacy of Union Carbide in Bhopal" Radical Journal of Health (New Series) Vol. II:I, 68–71, Mumbai, India, 1996.
- Satinath Sarangi, "Injured Psyches" Radical Journal of Health (New Series) Vol. I, 66–70, Mumbai, India, 1995.
- Satinath Sarangi "Bhopal Disaster : Judiciary’s Failure" Economic and Political Weekly, 18 November 2907 – 2909, Mumbai, India, 1995.

== Lectures ==
Addressed public meetings, seminars and conferences in Czechoslovakia, France, Hong Kong, Ireland, Italy, Japan, Malaysia, Netherlands, South Korea, Sweden, United Kingdom and United States of America, including at the following Universities: University of California, Berkeley, Massachusetts Institute of Technology, Boston, University of Massachusetts, Amherst, Stanford University, San Francisco, Columbia University, New York, University of Michigan, Ann Arbor, University of Maryland, College Park, Maryland, University of the District of Columbia, Washington DC, London School of Economics, London, University of Sussex, Brighton, School of Oriental and African Studies, London, London School of Hygiene and Tropical Medicine, London, International Institute of Social Studies, The Hague, Netherlands and other places.

== Websites ==
- The Bhopal Medical Appeal
- The International Campaign for Justice in Bhopal
- Students for Bhopal
- Chingari Trust
