= Zach Kirkhorn =

American business executive (born 1984)

- Born: 1984 or 1985 (age 41–42)
- Education: University of Pennsylvania; Harvard University
- Occupation: Chief financial officer
- Known for: Tesla, Inc.

Zach Kirkhorn (born 1984) is an American business executive working in the automotive manufacturing industry. He served as the chief financial officer (CFO) of Tesla, Inc. from 2019 until he stepped down in August 2023.

== Early life and education ==
Kirkhorn grew up in the suburbs of Washington, D.C.

From 2002 to 2006, Kirkhorn studied both Economics at The Wharton School and Mechanical Engineering and Applied Mechanics at the University of Pennsylvania as part of the Jerome Fisher Program in Management and Technology. In 2013, he received an MBA from Harvard Business School.

== Career ==
During his studies in 2005, Kirkhorn joined Microsoft as a financial analyst intern. In 2006, he did another four-month internship at Microsoft as program manager intern. After graduating in 2006, Kirkhorn worked at the consulting firm McKinsey & Company as a business analyst.

In 2010, Kirkhorn joined Tesla as a senior analyst in finance. In December 2014, he became director of finance, and in December 2018 he was appointed as vice president of finance. On January 30, 2019, Kirkhorn was announced to replace Deepak Ahuja as Tesla's new CFO on the fourth-quarter Tesla earnings call. In March 2021 he was given the title 'Master of Coin' within Tesla, a reference to the Game of Thrones title for a treasurer.

Kirkhorn stepped down from his role as CFO of Tesla in August 2023.

== Personal life ==
In April 2018, Kirkhorn married his partner Daniel Alexander Naughton, then a senior finance manager at OpenTable. Having met at McKinsey in 2010, the couple own homes in Oakland, California and Austin, Texas.
