= Salil Prabhakar =

Salil Prabhakar from OptiML Vision Inc., Newark, CA was named a Fellow of the Institute of Electrical and Electronics Engineers (IEEE) in 2012 for contributions to biometrics technology. He was named a Fellow of the Society of Photographic Instrumentation Engineers (SPIE) in 2014 and a Fellow of the International Association for Pattern Recognition (IAPR) in 2012.

Salil Prabhakar cofounded Delta ID Inc in the San Francisco Bay Area in 2011. Prior to that he was part of the initial core Aadhar team as a bio-metric expert, and was Chief Scientist and Director of Engineering at Digital Persona Inc. in Redwood City. Salil Prabhakar completed his Ph.D. from Michigan State University in 2001. He graduated in Computer Science and Engineering (CSE) from Indian Institute of Technology (BHU) Varanasi in 1996.
