= N. Ravishankar =

Indian materials engineer and professor

- Born: 12 February 1970 (age 56); India
- Education: IIT BHU; Indian Institute of Science; Toyohashi University of Technology; University of Minnesota
- Known for: Studies on Nanostructured materials
- Spouse: Vidya Ravishankar
- Children: Snehasri Ravishankar
- Awards: 2011 Materials Research Society of India Medal; 2012 Shanti Swarup Bhatnagar Prize
- Scientific career
- Fields: Nanostructured Materials; Electron microscopy
- Workplaces: Indian Institute of Science
- Doctoral advisor: Kamanio Chattopadhyay

Ravishankar Narayanan (born 12 February 1970) is an Indian materials engineer and a professor at the Materials Research Centre of the Indian Institute of Science. He is known for his studies on Nanostructured Materials and is an elected fellow of the Indian Academy of Sciences. The Council of Scientific and Industrial Research, the apex agency of the Government of India for scientific research, awarded him the Shanti Swarup Bhatnagar Prize for Science and Technology, one of the highest Indian science awards for his contributions to Engineering Sciences in 2012.

== Biography ==
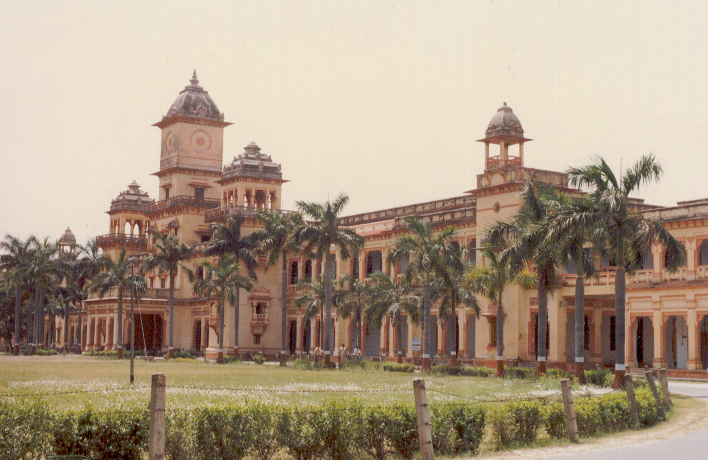
IIT BHU Varanasi

N. Ravishankar, born on 12 February 1970, did his graduate studies in metallurgical engineering at the Indian Institute of Technology, Varanasi from where he earned a BTech in 1991. Subsequently, he shifted his base to Bengaluru to continue his studies at the Indian Institute of Science (IISc) and earned his master's degree (MSc) in 1993 and followed it up with a doctoral degree (PhD) in 1998. During this period, he did research at the Toyohashi University of Technology as an exchange program scholar in 1996. His postdoctoral studies were at the laboratory of C. Barry Carter of the University of Minnesota from 1998 to 2002. On his return to India, he joined the IISc as a member of faculty at the Materials Research Centre (MRC). At the MRC, he serves as a professor and heads the Functional Inorganic Nanostructures Laboratory.

== Legacy ==
Ravishankar's research has been focused on the bottom-up paradigm for the synthesis and assembly of nanostructures. He is known to have done extensive work on the template free synthesis of nanowires and shape selection of low-dimensional nanostructured metals which has applications in the development of diagnostic and sensing devices. He led a team of scientists who developed, for the first time, ultrathin gold nanowires, with a diameter less than 2 nanometres and high angle boundaries, for use as reaction catalysts for cells. They have also developed a solvothermal process integrating synthesis and assembly. He has documented his researches by way of several articles; Google Scholar and ResearchGate, online article repositories of scientific articles, have listed many of them. He is a member of the Solar Energy Research Institute for India and the United States (SERIIUS), an Indo-US joint initiative for the development of solar energy technologies. He has also been a member of the Advisory Committee of the International Conference on Metals and Materials Research, organized by the Indian Institute of Metals, in association with a number of science organizations, in June 2016. He has delivered several keynote or invited lectures including those at the workshop on Advanced Tools for Nanoscopic Materials Characterization (2015), and Nanodays 2015.

== Awards and honors ==
Ravishankar was selected for the Swarnajayanthi Fellowship of the Department of Science and Technology for the year 2009–10. He received the MRSI Medal of the Materials Research Society of India in 2011 and the Council of Scientific and Industrial Research awarded him the Shanti Swarup Bhatnagar Prize, one of the highest Indian science awards in 2012. The Indian Academy of Sciences elected him as their fellow in 2015.

== See also ==
- Nanotechnology
