= Prem Jain =

Indian mechanical engineer (1936–2018)

Dr. Prem Jain
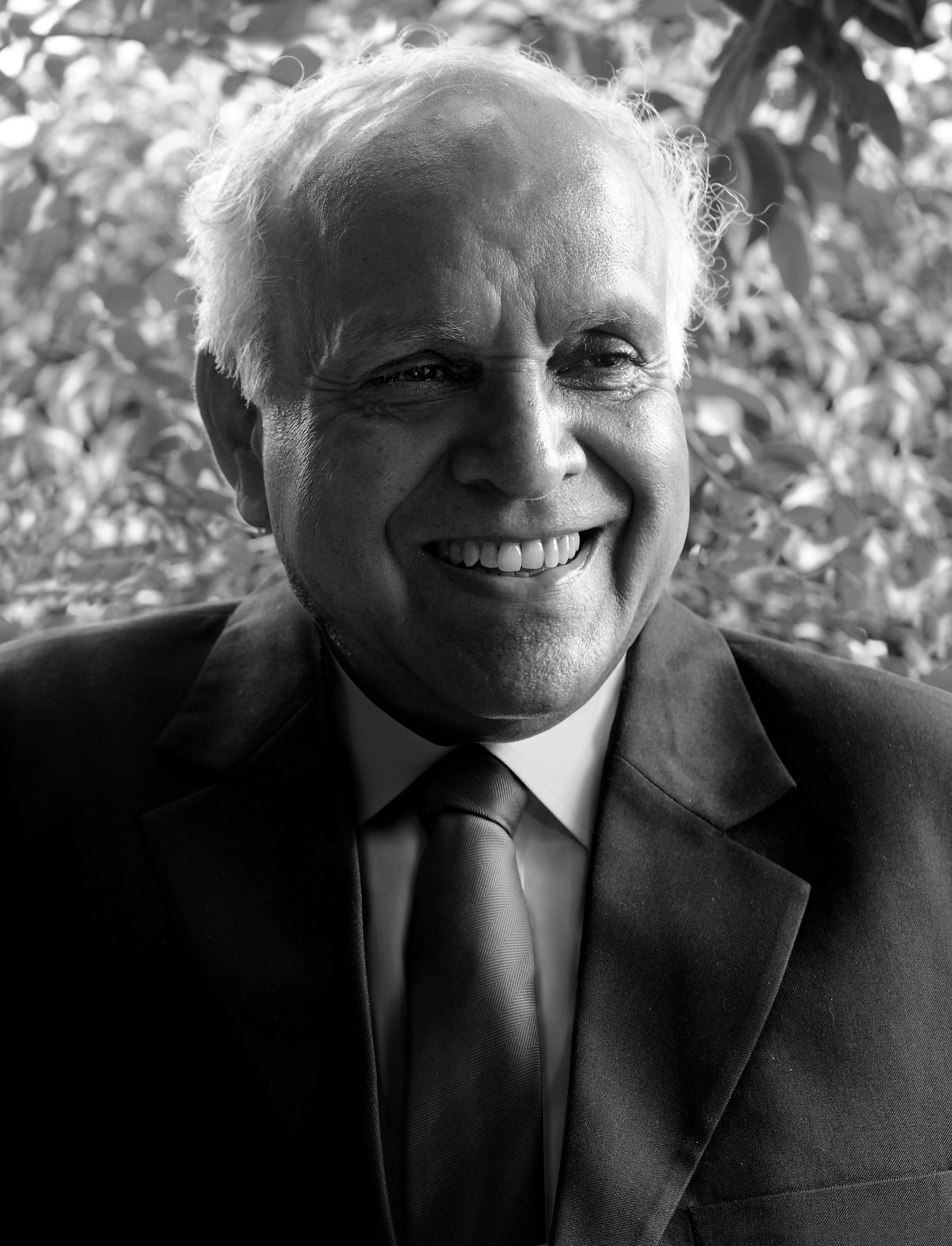
- Father of Indian Green Buildings
- Born: January 26, 1936
- Died: September 20, 2018 (aged 82)
- Education: Mechanical Engineering, PhD
- Alma mater: Banaras Hindu University (BHU), Rensselaer Polytechnic Institute; University of Minnesota
- Occupations: Engineer, Entrepreneur and Researcher
- Known for: Starting the revolution for Green Buildings in India
- Spouse: Renu Jain
- Children: Payal Jain
- Awards: Rashtriya Gaurav Award

Dr Prem Jain (26 January 1936 – 20 September 2018) was an Indian mechanical engineer, also known as the Father of Green Buildings in India. Jain served as the chairman of Indian Green Building Council (IGBC).

== Early life and education ==
Prem Jain did his BSC ME from IT BHU in 1957 and studied further to receive a master's MSME from University of Minnesota in 1960, and PhD in 1967 from the same institute. After returning to India, he was a visiting professor at IIT Kanpur. During his tenure, he set up a separate laboratory for Environmental Engineering. Jain was also on the faculty at School of Planning and Architecture Delhi.

== Career ==
He worked with Carrier Corp R&D USA and then with Stein Doshi Bhalla, an architectural firm. During his tenure with this firm, Jain worked for the design of IIC expansion, Ford Foundation & UNICEF (WWF) buildings on Lodi Road, Zakir Hussain Memorial in Okhla, Escorts Factory Building in Faridabad and Expansion of Triveni Kala Sangam in New Delhi. Alongside his professional achievements, he dedicated 47 years as Visiting Faculty at the School of Planning and Architecture, New Delhi.He Founded ISHRAE, which today has more than 14,000 members and 8,000 student members. In 1980 Jain founded Spectral Services Consultants Private Limited (now an AECOM company) to provide Mechanical, Electrical & Plumbing (MEP) designs. During his work at Spectral, As Founder he played a key role in revising the HVAC and sustainability sections of the National Building Code of India (NBC) in 2005 and 2016, serving as Convenor for HVAC (Chapter 8, Part 3) and Sustainability (Chapter 11).He took over as Chairman Emeritus for AECOM India in 2015, the world’s No. 1 Consultancy with 1 Lakh engineers & architects in 150 countries. He led his company to the world’s highest 60 platinum and 40 gold awards from IGBC & USGBC, for the design of services for Green Buildings in India.

== Notable Projects ==
- Rashtrapati Bhawan Darbar Hall
- Prime Minister's Office
- Vigyan Bhawan & AIIMS New Delhi (renovated after fire)
- Bahaii Temple (Lotus Temple) Extension New Delhi
- Siddhi Vinayak Temple Mumbai
- MoEF Headquarter Building
- Indira Pariyavaran Bhawan, New Delhi
- Goa, Hyderabad & Delhi International Airport Ltd. New Delhi
- World Heart Organization (WHO), New Delhi
- Goa Legislative Assembly
- All India Institute of Medical Sciences New Delhi
- Delhi Metro Rail Corporation Headquarters
- AP state New Legislative Assembly & Annexe, Hyderabad
- Darbar Hall, Rashtrapati Bhawan, New Delhi
- Indian Institute of Management, Ahmedabad
- Indira Gandhi National Centre for Arts, New Delhi
- Indira Paryavaran Bhawan, Jorbagh, New Delhi
- North South University, Dhaka, Bangladesh
- ISRO Shar Mission Control Centre Building, Srihari Kota
- Patna Vidhan Sabha, Bihar
- Kokilaben Dhirubhai Ambani Hospital, Mumbai
- Medanta Medicity Integrated Medical Facilities, Gurgaon
- Wockhardt Hospital, Mumbai, Bengaluru & Kolkata
- CII-Sohrabji Godrej Green Business Centre, Hyderabad
- India Exposition Mart, Part I & II, Greater Noida
- National Stock Exchange India Ltd. BKC, Mumbai
- Doha City Centre, Doha, Qatar

== Awards and recognition ==
- First practicing engineer in India to have been nominated in 1995 as Fellow of the Ashrae, USA
- Distinguished Leadership for Internationals Award by University of Minnesota

=== National Awards ===
- ASHRAE Lifetime Service Award (2013)
- Consulting Engineers Association of India Lifetime Achievement Award (2013)

=== International Awards ===
- World CSR Sustainability Gold Award (2016)
- University of Minnesota Distinguished Leadership Award for International alumnus (2011)
- ASHRAE USA Distinguished Fifty Year Member Award (2009)
- ASHRAE’s Louise & Bill Holladay Distinguished Fellow (First Indian) (2005)
- The Asia 500 Leaders for The New Century (2000)
- ASHRAE Fellow (First Indian) (1995

== Prem Jain Memorial Trust ==
Prem Jain died aged 82 on 20 September 2018 in Delhi. A trust called Prem Jain Memorial Trust was founded.
