= Kashiyatra =

Festival at the Indian Institute of Technology Varanasi

Kashiyatra काशीयात्रा
- Dates: 7–9 March 2025
- Frequency: Yearly
- Location: Varanasi
- Established: 1981
- Website: kashiyatra.org

Kashiyatra, also known as KY, is the annual socio-cultural festival of Indian Institute of Technology (BHU) Varanasi. It is a four-day long event held in January every year, and is one of the most prominent college festivals in India. Kashiyatra is one of the largest socio-culture festivals in Asia, with over 360 colleges and universities taking part.

Kashiyatra has over 90,000 participants across over 60 events, including performances by celebrities.

== History ==
Kashiyatra had its first edition in the year 1981. It has been named Sparsh and Spandan in the past. Over the years, Kashiyatra has seen the participation of prominent Indian cultural icons like classical singers Pandit Hariprasad Chaurasia, Ustad Bismillah Khan, and singers Shubha Mudgal, Shaan, Lucky Ali, Shibani Kashyap and Javed Ali. In 2006, Miss India Earth 2005 Niharika Singh took part in a fashion show organised as a part of it. Well known bands like Parikrama and Indian Ocean too have performed here.

== Events ==
=== Competitions ===
- Abhinay (dramatics competition) consists of stage plays, mono-acting, street-play. and mimes
- Bandish (Indian music competition) features singing competitions from across the country including contestants from popular reality shows such as "Indian Idol" and "Sa Re Ga Ma Pa". It encompasses solo, duet and group performance of light and classical Indian and Western vocals.
- Crosswindz (rock music competition) fuses an Inter-College Rock Rock Festival with a Professional Rock Band as the final act. In the past, Crosswindz has seen performances such as Parikrama, Indian Ocean, Orange Street etc.
- Enquizta (quiz competition) consists of multiple quizzes. It has hosted some of India's largest quizzes over the years with participation in excess of 5000, by prominent quizmasters such as Vikram Joshi.
- Mirage (fashion competition)
- Natraj (dance competition) comprises solo, duo and group performances
- Toolika (art competition) comprises sculptures, paintings on canvas, mehendi, tattoo and rangoli-making.
- Samwaad (literary competition) comprises debates, extempore speeches, just-a-minute, poetry, and storytelling events.
- Model United Nations has been held every year since 2013

=== Pronites ===
- Antarnaad is the final night of Kashiyatra which sees famous artists and bands from the Indian film industry such as Lucky Ali, Javed Ali, Indian Ocean, Underground Authority, Parikrama etc.
- Fusion Nite is a creative amalgamation of classical Western and Indian Music which has witnessed the presence of the Dunes of Rajasthan, Rishi Inc and others.
- Kavi Sammelan is a poetic symposium which has been graced by Kumar Vishwas, Surendra Sharma and others.
- Bollywood Night is the celebrity performances by most renowned artist like Darshan Raval, Raftar, Amit Trivedi
