= Sankat Mochan Foundation =

Indian environmental protection NGO

Sankat Mochan Foundation (SMF) is a non-governmental organization devoted to cleaning the pollution of the Ganges and protecting the Ganges river in India. The environmental mission is related to the religious mission of Sankat Mochan Temple and Late Veer Bhadra Mishra was manager of both organizations. Mishra was awarded the United Nations Environment Programme's (UNEP) the "Global 500 Roll of Honour" in 1992, The foundation has been working with Australia-based environmental group, Oz Greene, under a program called "Swatcha Ganga Abhiyan" for over 38 years. It celebrated its silver jubilee on 3–4 November 2007, with two-day event which concluded at the Tulsi Ghat, on the Ganges.

== History ==
Sankat Mochan Foundation was founded in 1982 as a non-profit, non-political organization under the "Societies Act" of the Government of India by Pandit Mishra. The vision of Sankat Mochan Foundation is to

1. Restore the Ganges by alleviating its fast deteriorating environmental conditions
2. Promote education and health care programs for the less privileged
3. Maintain and encourage the age-old cultural traditions of Varanasi, in tune with its current environmental needs

SMF runs the Swatcha Ganga (Clean Ganges) program, and so SMF is sometimes referred to as "Swatcha Ganga".

Historically, Sankat Mochan Foundation has managed support from both the Indian government and private foreign donors.

== Ganga Action Plan: Failures ==
The Ganga Action Plan launched in 1986 by the Government of India has not achieved any success despite expenditure of over five billion rupees. The government claims that the schemes under the Ganga Action Plan have been successful, but actual measurements and scientific data tell a different story. The failure of the GAP is evident but corrective action is lacking.

The ineffectiveness of the current Ganga Action Plan could be found based on the results observed in the following table:

Location / Parameters	Biochemical Oxygen Demand (mg/L)	Faecal Coliform Count / 100ml
At beginning of the Varanasi City ... Near Assi/Tulsi ghat	3–8 mg/L	20,000 - 100,000 per 100ml
Downstream of the Varanasi City ... Varuna confluence with the Ganges	20–50 mg/L	1,000,000-2,000,000 per 100ml
Permissible limits for bathing	Less than 3 mg/L	Less than 500 per 100ml

Note: The higher the Biochemical Oxygen Demand, the higher the pollution (conversely there is more dissolved oxygen needed to make the water safe).

== Advanced Integrated Wastewater Pond Systems ==
SMF is implementing a system called "Advanced Integrated Wastewater Pond Systems (AIWPS)". Each AIWPS facility designs and incorporates a series of low-cost ponds or earthwork reactors. A typical AIWPS facility consists of a minimum of four ponds in series. These systems would store sewage for 45 days, using bacteria and algae to eliminate waste and purify the water.

SMF's evaluations show AIWPS to be lower cost, more energy-efficient, more climate-appropriate, and more effective at treating sewage than other proposals submitted. Sankat Mochan Foundation, working alongside Oswald Green LLC now Oswald Green Technologies, Inc., had proposed this system for treating the sewage water that is being let in to the Ganges River near Varanasi. This solution has been supported by Varanasi Nagar Nigam (Varanasi Local Government Body, Municipal Corporation) but central and state government have not approved the budget.

Recently NGT directed NMCG to monitor the progress of implementation of action plan of Namami Gange project

== See also ==
- Pollution of the Ganges
