= Sankat Mochan Hanuman Temple =

Hindu temple in Varanasi, Uttar Pradesh, India

- संकट मोचन हनुमान मंदिर
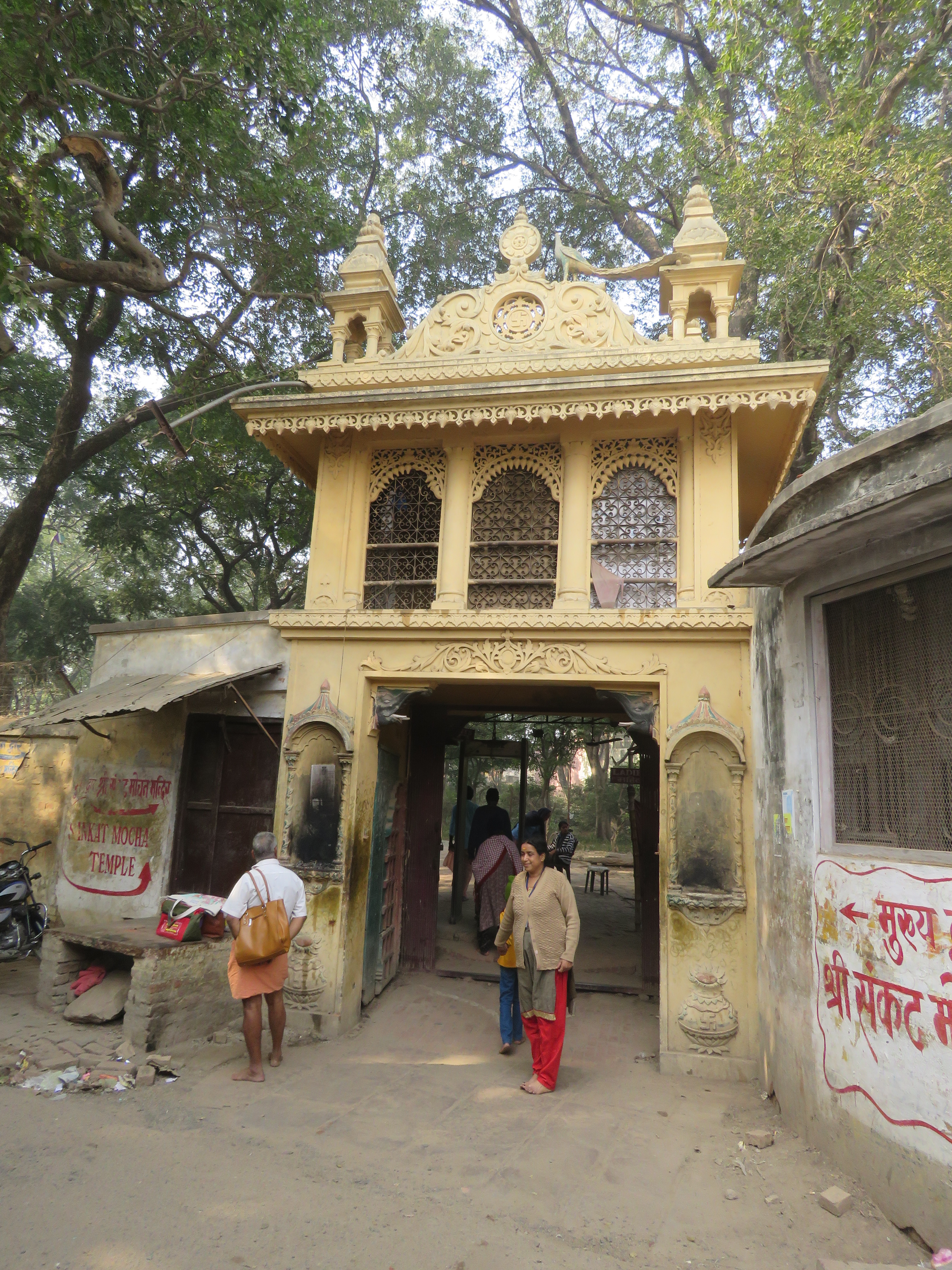
- The entrance to Sankat Mochan Hanuman Temple

- Temple location on Varanasi district map

Religion
- Affiliation: Hinduism
- Deity: Hanuman, Rama

Location
- Location: Varanasi
- State: Uttar Pradesh
- Country: India
- Coordinates: 25.2821062°N 82.9999769°E

Architecture
- Type: Hindu architecture
- Creator: Tulsidas
- Completed: 16th century

The Sankat Mochan Hanuman Temple is a Hindu temple in Varanasi, Uttar Pradesh, India dedicated to the Hindu deity Hanuman, in his form as sankat mochan (saṅkaṭamocana), meaning the "reliever from troubles". The temple was established by the Hindu preacher and poet-saint Tulsidas in the early 16th century. It is situated on the banks of the Assi river.

== History ==
The temple was founded by the poet-saint Tulsidas, author of the Ramcharitmanas, on the site where he is believed to have had a vision of Hanuman. According to tradition, Tulsidas composed a substantial portion of the epic at this shrine. The temple attracts thousands of worshippers, particularly on Tuesdays and Saturdays, days considered auspicious for Hanuman. In Hindu astrology, Hanuman is believed to protect devotees from the malefic influences of planets, particularly Shani (Saturn) and Mangala (Mars); consequently, many pilgrims visit the temple seeking astrological remedies.

The legend of Tulsidas's meeting with Hanuman—who attended the poet's katha disguised as an elderly leper before leading him to the wooded clearing where the temple stands—was first recorded in the Bhaktirasa bodhini, Priyadas's commentary on the Bhaktamal (c. 1713). According to Philip Lutgendorf, the inner shrine houses a stone image of Hanuman attributed to Tulsidas's era. Most of the complex's modern structures were built in the mid 20th century as the site grew in prominence following the southward expansion of Varanasi and the establishment of Banaras Hindu University. An eight-and-a-half-acre semi-wild preserve, home to troops of monkeys, surrounds the temple grounds.

The temple is an important centre for performances of the Ramcharitmanas. Philip Lutgendorf, describing it in the early 1980s, noted that devotees recite the epic before the main shrine every morning and evening—especially the Sundar Kand, which celebrates Hanuman's exploits. Professional expounders discourse on the poem in the temple courtyard every afternoon, the temple holds twice-yearly exposition (katha) festivals, and on Hanuman Jayanti, groups from across the city sing the epic through the night. The temple also sponsors the Tulsi Ghat Ramlila, an eighteen-day production of the epic staged during the Dussehra season, whose organising committee dates from 1933 but which claims to continue a tradition begun by Tulsidas himself.

=== Terrorist incident ===
On 7 March 2006, one of three explosions hit the temple while the aarti was in progress in which numerous worshippers and wedding attendees were participating. The crowd helped each other in the rescue operation after the explosion. The next day a large number of devotees resumed their worship as usual.

== Temple today ==
The temple still continues to be attended by thousands of Rama and Hanuman devotees who chant Hanuman Chalisa and Sundarkand (also provided in the form of a booklet in the temple for free). After the terrorist incident of 2006, a permanent police post was set up inside the temple.

== Visiting Time ==
- Temple Timings: Opens at 4:30 AM and closes at 10:30 PM. On Tuesday and Saturday, the temple stays open until midnight.
- Afternoon Closing: Please note that Darshan is closed between 12:00 Noon and 3:00 PM daily.
- Facilities: The temple provides its own locker facility for mobile phones and cameras, as these are not allowed inside.
- Prashad: It is highly recommended to buy 'Besan Ke Laddu' (Prashad) from the shops located inside the temple premises for authenticity.

== Sankat Mochan Foundation ==
The Sankat Mochan Foundation (SMF) was established in 1982 by Veer Bhadra Mishra, the Mahant (High priest) of the temple, and has been working for cleaning and protecting the Ganges river. Its projects are funded in part by aid from the U. S. and Swedish governments. Mishra was formerly former Head of the Civil Engineering Department at the Indian Institute of Technology (BHU) Varanasi [IIT(BHU)] and was awarded United Nations Environment Programme (UNEP) established the "Global 500 Roll of Honour" in 1992, and later the TIME magazine's "Hero of the Planet" award in 1999.

The foundation has been working with Australia-based environmental group, Oz Greene, under a programme called "Swatcha Ganga Abhiyan" for over 25 years. It celebrated its silver jubilee on 3–4 November 2007, with two-day event which concluded at the Tulsi Ghat, on the Ganges.

== Sankat Mochan Sangeet Samaroh ==
Each year in the month of April, the temple organizes a classical music and dance concert festival titled "Sankat Mochan Sangeet Samaroh", in which musicians and performers from all over India take part. The first festival was organized 88 years ago, and it has invited musicians and dancers including Odissi guru Kelucharan Mahapatra, who was associated since its early days. In fact he was instrumental in starting women's participation in the festival with Sanjukta Panigrahi, Swapna Sundari and Kankana Banerjee.

In 2009, the six-day concert saw over 35 artists including, vocalist Jasraj and Kathak exponent Birju Maharaj.

The 2010 concert was spread over five days, during which artists such as Jasraj, Sunanda Patnaik, Channulal Mishra, Rajan-Sajan Mishra and Amar Nath Mishra performed.

In 2015 concert Pakistani-ghazal singer Ghulam Ali performed at Sankat Mochan Sangeet Samaroh.

== See also ==
- Sankat Mochan Temple, Shimla
- Hindu temples in Varanasi
