= Sandeep Pandey =

Indian activist

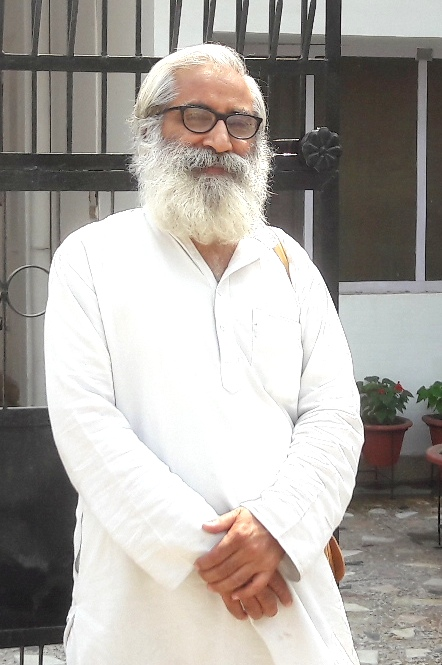
- Dr. Pandey at his residence in Lucknow in 2019
- Born: 22 July 1965 (age 61)
- Education: Institute of Technology, Banaras Hindu University (now Indian Institute of Technology (BHU) Varanasi), Syracuse University, University of California, Berkeley
- Occupation: Social Activist
- Known for: Asha for Education and NAPM and PUCL
- Political party: Socialist Party (India)
- Awards: Ramon Magsaysay award, 2002

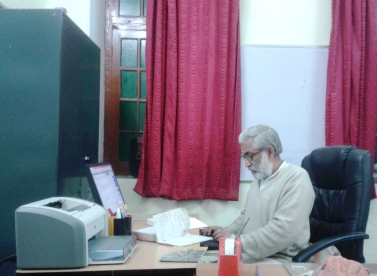
Dr. Pandey in his chamber in the Chemical Engineering department, IIT (BHU), Varanasi before his expulsion.

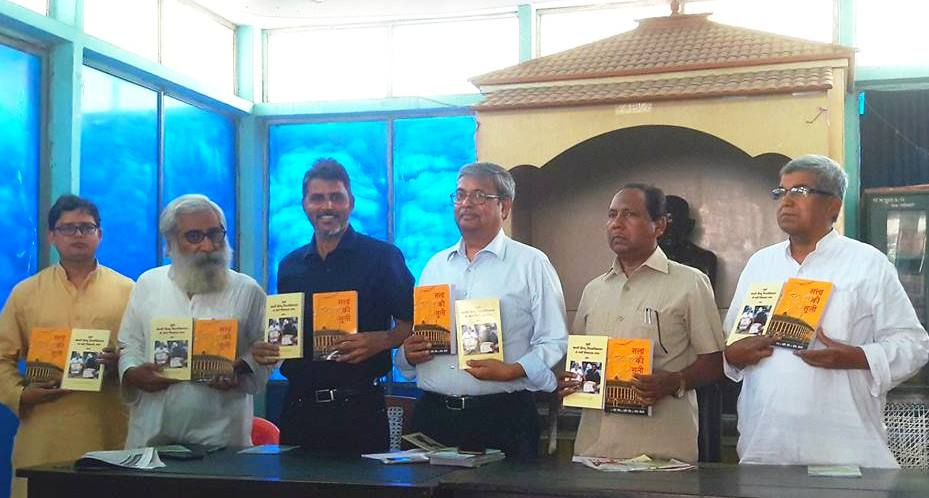
At the launch event of his book "Mujhe Kashi Hindu Vishwavidyalaya Se Kyun Nikala Gaya" at Lucknow on April 22, 2019.

Sandeep Pandey (born 22 July 1965) is an Indian social activist and the present General Secretary of the Socialist Party (India). He co-founded Asha for Education with Dr. Deepak Gupta (presently Professor at IIT Kanpur) and V.J.P Srivastava while working on his Ph.D. in Mechanical Engineering at the University of California, Berkeley. He has taught as a visiting professor at Indian Institute of Management Bangalore, Indian Institute of Management Ahmedabad, Indian Institute of Technology Gandhinagar, NALSAR University of Law and Indian Institute of Technology (BHU) Varanasi.

== Early life ==
Pandey is an alumnus of the Institute of Technology, Banaras Hindu University (now Indian Institute of Technology (BHU) Varanasi). Thereafter he did his Master's in manufacturing and computer science from Syracuse University, followed by a doctorate in control theory at the University of California, Berkeley, which he completed in 1992.

== Career ==
After completing his education, he moved back to India and started teaching at the Indian Institute of Technology Kanpur in 1992 and later founded a registered organisation named Asha Trust which currently has several centres/chapters across India. His team has launched a people's group named Asha Parivar in 2008 that focuses on strengthening democracy at the grassroots in Hardoi district of Uttar Pradesh.

Pandey's work at Asha Parivar is focused on Right to Information and other forms of citizen participation in removing corruption and improving the efficiency of governance. He leads the National Alliance of People's Movements (NAPM), the largest network of grassroots people's movements in India.

He was awarded the Ramon Magsaysay Award (often termed the 'Asian Nobel prize') in 2002 for the emergent leadership category. Pandey led an Indo-Pakistan peace march from New Delhi to Multan in 2005.

He has served as an adviser to the Indian government's Central Advisory Board for Education (CABE). His idea of education is based on empowerment by imbibing the spirit of co-operation instead of competition.

Sandeep Pandey's contract as a visiting faculty in the Chemical Engineering department at Indian Institute of Technology (BHU), Varanasi was prematurely terminated in January, 2016.

Statement issued by Sandeep Pandey after being sacked from IIT-BHU

"My contract at IIT, BHU Varanasi as a visiting faculty has prematurely ended after teaching there for 2.5 years due to a decision of Board of Governors. In a recent Board meeting the Vice Chancellor of BHU, who was made the Chairman of IIT BoG by Minister of HRD, GoI, bypassing the panel of five names recommended by a resolution of BoG, Prof. G.C. Tripathi, and Dean of Faculty Affairs, IIT, BHU, Prof. Dhananjay Pandey, both gentlemen associated with RSS, primarily forced the decision. The charges against me are that I'm a naxalite, showed a banned documentary on Nirbhaya case and am involved in anti-national activities.

I wish to clarify that I'm not a naxalite. The ideology that I would consider myself closest to is Gandhian. But I do identify with the causes taken up by naxalites even though I may not agree with their methods. I also think that it requires a lot of courage and sacrifice to be a naxalite and I certainly don't have that kind of resolve. The banned documentary on Nirbhaya made by BBC was to be screened in my Development Studies class during the even semester of academic year 2014-15 but the decision was withdrawn after intervention of Chief Proctor of BHU and S.O. of Lanka Police Station just before the class. However, a discussion on the issue of violence against women in our society was conducted after screening a different documentary.

I don't believe in the idea of a nation or national boundaries, which I think are responsible for artificial divisions among human beings similar to ones on the basis of caste or religion. Hence I cannot be anti or pro-nation. I am pro-people. I'm not a nationalist but am a universalist."

— Sandeep Pandey,

Later in April 2016, the Allahabad High Court quashed the decision citing the violation of principal of natural justice.

In April, 2019 he launched his book titled "Mujhe Kashi Hindu Vishwavidyalaya Se Kyun Nikala Gaya" at New Delhi, Lucknow and Varanasi. This book throws light on the work he did during his stint as professor at IIT (BHU), the reasons and events leading to his expulsion and the elaborate Allahabad High Court judgement clearing him of all the false accusations resulting in his expulsion.

== Controversies ==
In 2002, he attended the opening session of a conference organised by the Communist Party of India, Marxist Leninist Liberation, (CPI-MLL). Several prominent social activists, environmentalists, and writers-turned-activists like Mahashweta Devi, Arundhati Roy, Sandeep Pandey, Rajinder Sachar, Praful Bidwai, and Anand Patwardhan attended only the opening session of the six-day congress. Sandeep Pandey and other social activists did not attend the closing session in which the kin of about 1000 Naxalites who were killed in police action in Bihar were reportedly honoured.

Upon receiving the Ramon Magsaysay Award, he returned the cash portion of the award on being challenged to do so by a Philippine newspaper for his earlier remarks describing America as "the biggest terrorist state in the world." Pandey later clarified that he had never meant to criticise the people of the United States but its government.

In 2010, he visited Dantewada district in Chhattisgarh for a Jan Sunvayi (people's hearing) on atrocities by the local government. His visit was seemingly opposed by some members of local tribal community, where some local tribals were shown to be protesting against him and his team. It was said by Medha Patkar, that the protest was "stage managed" by the district administration officials themselves and the government was rousing the locals rural folk against the civil rights workers. Patkar also added that their team is not in favour of government responding to the violence perpetrated by Maoists by further violence by the state. She referred to Salwa Judum as an example of excesses by the state.

== Personal life ==
Sandeep is the eldest of the three children of Sri U S Pandey who was an engineer in Railways and retired as member Railway Board. His younger brother Rahul who is an IIT Kanpur and IIM Ahmedabad alumnus lives in Bengaluru. His sister Priyanka lives in USA.

Pandey lives in Indira Nagar, Lucknow, Uttar Pradesh. He is married to Arundhati Dhuru and has two children, Anandi Pandey and Chaitanya Pandey. He is a vegan and thus resents the consumption of milk and other dairy products.

== See also ==
- Right to Information Act
