= Jay Chaudhry =

Indian-American businessman (born 1958)

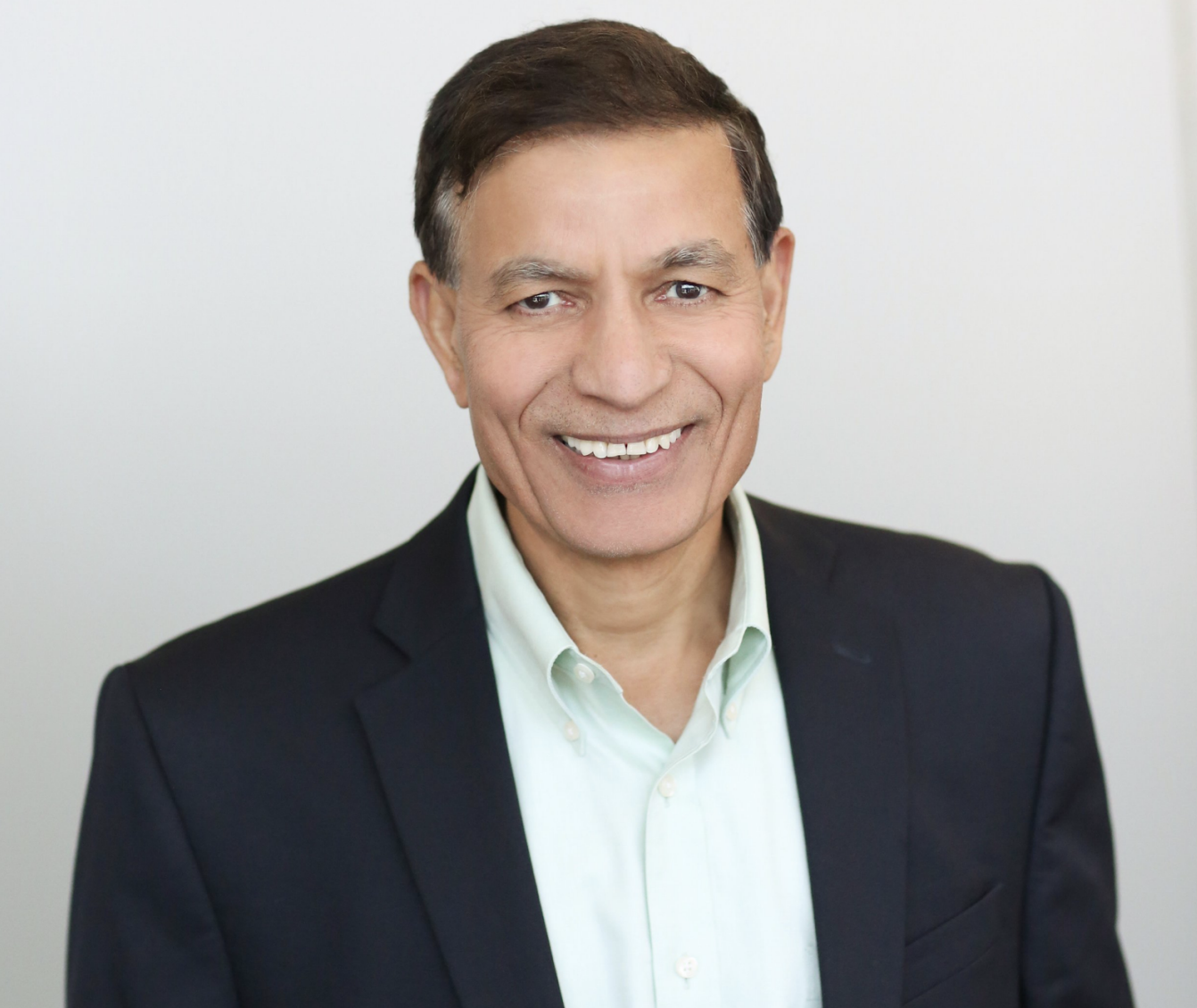
- Born: 1958 (age 67–68); Panoh, Punjab, India (now in Himachal Pradesh, India)
- Citizenship: United States
- Education: IIT (BHU) Varanasi; University of Cincinnati
- Occupations: Chairman, CEO and founder of Zscaler
- Spouse: Jyoti Chaudhry
- Children: 3
- Website: zscaler.com/company/leadership/jay-chaudhry

Jay Chaudhry (born August 26, 1958) is an Indian-American technology entrepreneur and the CEO and founder of cloud security company Zscaler.

== Early life and education ==
Chaudhry was born in Panoh, a village in the Una district of Punjab (now Himachal Pradesh), India with a population of 800. The village did not have running water or electricity until he was a teenager. His parents, Bhagat and Surjeet Chaudhry, were small-scale farmers, and he was the youngest of three sons.

In an interview, Chaudhry recalled that he used to walk nearly 4 km every day to attend high school in Dhusara, the neighboring village and, because there was no electricity, he often studied outside under a tree.

Following the completion of high school, he earned a bachelor's degree in electronics engineering from Indian Institute of Technology, Banaras Hindu University.

In 1980, at age 22, he moved to the United States to attend the University of Cincinnati, where he received master's degrees in industrial engineering, computer engineering, and marketing.

He also completed the executive management program at Harvard Business School.

== Career ==
Chaudhry started out working in engineering, sales, marketing and management at IBM, Unisys, and NCR. He went on to become the founder of five security software startups.

=== SecureIT (1996–1998) ===
In 1996, he and his wife Jyoti founded Internet security service SecureIT, using their life savings to do so. After SecureIT was acquired by Verisign in 1998, Chaudhry moved to San Francisco to lead Verisign's security services division. He left Verisign in 1999.

=== CipherTrust and CoreHarbor (2000–2006) ===
In 2000, Chaudhry launched email security company CipherTrust. The idea for CipherTrust came from his work at SecureIT, where he became familiar with the types of security issues, vulnerabilities and attacks that were possible. The technology was built from scratch and was later acquired by Secure Computing Corporation in 2006 for $274 million.

In 2000, Chaudhry launched CoreHarbor, a managed e-commerce platform. It was later acquired by USi/AT&T.

=== AirDefense (2002–2008) ===
In 2002, Chaudhry launched wireless security company AirDefense, which operates as a provider of a wireless intrusion prevention system that monitors airwaves and traffic between laptops and WiFi access points. AirDefense was acquired by Motorola in 2008.

=== Zscaler (2007–present) ===
Chaudhry founded Zscaler, a zero trust cloud security company, in 2007. His goal was to build the Salesforce of cloud security, inspired by Marc Benioff.

== Recognitions ==
Chaudhry is the recipient of three awards by Indian Institute of Technology (Banaras Hindu University), Varanasi: Alumnus of the Year (2015), Alumnus of the Century in Making (2019), the Distinguished Alumnus/Alumna Awards (2021–22), and the American India Foundation's Corporate Leadership Award (2022).

In 2018, he was a finalist for the EY Entrepreneur of the Year Award program in Northern California.

== Personal life ==
Chaudhry and his wife, Jyoti, have three children and live in Reno, Nevada, U.S. Chaudhry is a vegetarian.

Chaudhry enjoys hiking, white-water raft and “bonding walks” around his neighborhood with his family. Jay likes reading and favors books on history, global politics and psychology.

== Philanthropy ==
Chaudhry makes regular trips to Panoh, India. In 2011, he arranged for a mobile medical lab to give older residents blood tests and other checkups.

In 2022, Chaudhry gifted $1 million to his alma mater, IIT-BHU, to fund the school's Entrepreneurship Center and its Software Innovation Center. That year, he also donated $3 million to the Bay Area Chapter of the American India Foundation (AIF), an organization committed to improving the lives of India's underprivileged, to support COVID relief efforts.

In 2023, he donated $1 million to the Sankara Eye Foundation, an organization seeking to eradicate curable blindness in India.
