= Sambhavna Trust Clinic =

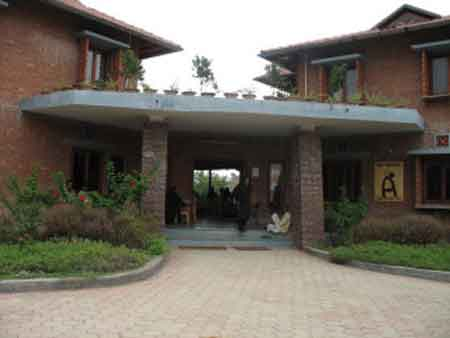
The entrance to the Sambhavna Trust Clinic.

The Sambhavna Trust Clinic, or Bhopal People's Health and Documentation Clinic, is a charitable trust run by a group of doctors, scientists, writers and social workers who have been involved with various aspects of the Union Carbide disaster (Bhopal disaster) in Bhopal, India, ever since its occurrence in December 1984.

The Clinic in Bhopal, run by the Sambhavna Trust and initiated by Satinath Sarangi, opened its doors on 2 September 1996 as an independent, community based, non-governmental medical initiative concerned with the long-term welfare of the survivors. It offers modern and traditional therapies free of cost to the disaster affected victims.

== Location ==
The Sambhavna Clinic is located 400 meters south of the former Union Carbide plant. The Clinic is also in proximity to communities affected by chemical contamination of the ground water.

== Patient profile ==
Patients with a history of gas exposure from the disaster and those who have proved exposure to contaminated ground water are eligible for treatment at the Clinic free of charge. In addition, children born to gas affected parents before December 1986 are also registered for care at the Clinic since research conducted at Sambhavna has shown these children also exhibit symptoms of exposure related health problems. As of 2006, the Sambhavna Trust Clinic remains the only institution to provide free health care to gas affected victims. Furthermore, the Clinic is the only health care provider in Bhopal to have a special classification for those who are suffering from ongoing contamination of the ground water and provide care to these persons at no cost as well.

== Allopathic care ==
Sambhavna's allopathic care team consists of general physicians, a pediatrician, a gynecologist, and a consultant in pathology. Their work is supported by an in-house pathology laboratory with facilities for biochemical, endocrinological, cytological, and microbiological investigation and diagnosis.

Careful records are kept of each patient's ailments, treatment, and outcome in detail for an investigatory database to establish the efficacy of different treatment protocols. These records are stored both in paper and pen format and an in-house electronic health record system on over 15 networked computers; this system is developed, programmed, and maintained by staff within the Sambhavna Trust Clinic.

== Ayurveda care ==
In conjunction with allopathic treatment, the Sambhavna Clinic provides Ayurveda care: A traditional medicine system of India. Two Ayurveda physicians and two Panchakarma therapists provide treatment through herbal medicines and through procedures of detoxification such as medicated oil massage, steam bath, medicinal oil stream, and medicinal enema.

=== Herbal medicine growth and production ===
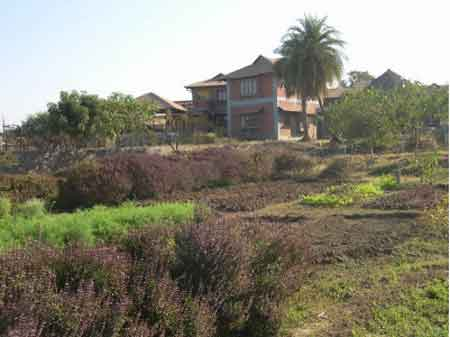
The lower area of the sloping herbal garden found at Sambhavna.

More than 150 species of medicinal plants are grown on a 1-acre garden next to the Clinic building. Instead of synthetic fertilizers and pesticides, Sambhavna utilizes vermicompost and bio pesticides for cultivation. More than eighty different kinds of Ayurvedic powders, oils, decoction, and pills are manufactured at the medicine making unit in Sambhavna using tools such as a pulverizer, pill press, and granulator. Significant features of the Ayurvedic health care at Sambhavna include predominant use of herbal drugs over mineral preparations (Rasa Shastra) and use of modern investigative facilities and techniques for objective assessment of efficacy.

=== Yoga ===
Yoga therapy has been found to be particularly useful for treatment of common gas exposure related health problems including breathlessness, backache, joint pains, menstrual irregularities, anxiety, and insomnia. Some of the research efforts at Sambhavna focus on demonstrating the efficacy of yoga therapy in management of gas exposure symptoms. Four objective studies have been conducted on the positive effects of yoga therapy within the patient population at the Clinic.

== Community outreach ==
Sambhavna community health workers fulfill many roles in the surrounding gas affected and water contaminated areas of Bhopal. First, the community health workers identify over a thousand patients in need of follow-up care at the Clinic each month and continue to visit these patients to monitor their health and adherence to treatment protocols.

Furthermore, they educate communities about common health issues and their treatments and preventions, run comprehensive TB, malaria, anemia control programs, and also organize community based screenings for cervical cancer. In addition, the health workers also collect data on various health markers in the communities they serve for research and health monitoring purposes (see Documentation and Research).

The community health workers also have formed voluntary health committees in different neighborhoods around Bhopal. To run these committees, the health workers have inspired, trained, and equipped health volunteers from each community to carry out some biochemical investigations of blood and urine and also prepare slides for examination for the malaria parasite. Starting in 2008, the health workers began to train people to grow and use various medicinal plants in their own neighborhoods. Six small but flourishing herbal gardens have been established in two communities.

== Documentation and research ==
Sambhavna maintains what is probably the most comprehensive collection of original source material related to the Bhopal disaster. The Clinic's library materials include newspaper clippings from December 1984 onwards, medical and scientific research papers, legal transcripts, government publications, corporate documents, pamphlets and posters from local and international campaigns, as well as books on a variety of health related subjects. The library is frequently used by researchers, journalists, activists, survivors, and Sambhavna staff.

=== Research ===
Research on the health consequences of exposure to toxic gases was terminated in 1994 by the Indian Council of Medical Research, and much of their findings remain unpublished to date. With limited staff and financial resources, Sambhavna has made significant contributions to the understanding of long-term health consequences of the disaster and the medical interventions which are effective in ameliorating these problems.

Over 8000 families affected by the gas disaster and control families matched for socio-economic status are currently used to establish cohorts for further investigation of specific health problems. Over the course of the conducted research at Sambhavna, several studies have been published in national and international journals.

=== Clinical data ===
Since 1996, Sambhavna has registered over 23,000 chronically ill patients from affected communities. Data collected from the field and patient record system is electronically catalogued daily, providing important information to guide future research and provide better care to survivors. Currently, Sambhavna has a networked system of informed consent, registration, and follow-up with continual updates of clinical data.

== Organization and funding ==
The Sambhavna Clinic is run by an 8-member board of trustees composed of scientists, doctors, editors, and activists who for many years have been involved with medical and other aspects of the disaster. A steering committee, elected by the staff, and two coordinators, look after the day-to-day running of the Clinic. Decision making, evaluation, planning, and review of clinic activities are based on equality, full participation, and consensus at the weekly staff meetings.

Sambhavna does not accept money from corporations, governments, or large funding agencies. All funds required to run the Sambhavna Trust Clinic come from individual donations and from the royalties of the book "It Was Five Past Midnight in Bhopal", by Dominique Lapierre and Javier Moro. A large portion of Sambhavna's funds come from over 15000 individuals in the UK who respond to advertisements placed by the Bhopal Medical Appeal in British newspapers. Contributions are from a variety of people from different backgrounds and socioeconomic levels. For example, the herbal medicine making facilities was built with funds donated by litter pickers at a music festival in the UK. Accounts of the Sambhavna Trust are audited annually and are open to public scrutiny.

== Volunteering ==
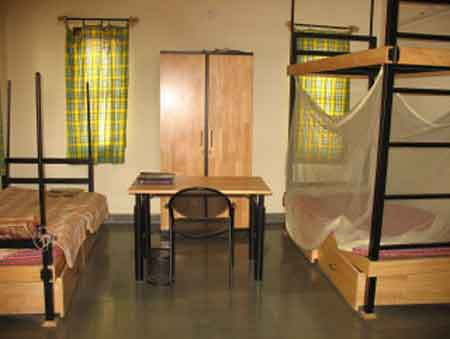
One of the dormitories for volunteers at the Sambhavna Trust Clinic.

Each year, more than two dozen volunteers from India and abroad extend services to Sambhavna during their stay, ranging from one week to two months. Volunteers have come from Canada, France, Germany, Japan, Switzerland, UK, USA, and other countries. These volunteers have offered a variety of services in their respective fields and applied their skills in medical work, social work, writing, research, gardening, photography, information systems, and more.

== Awards ==
- Tajiri Muneaki Prize for "meritorious services rendered to the victims of the Bhopal gas disaster" – July 1999
- Inner Flame Award by the Governor of Madhya Pradesh for "outstanding humanitarian work and excellence in deed" – September 2001
- Mead 2001 Centennial Award by the Margaret Mead Centennial Committee of the Institute for Intercultural Studies, New York and Whole Earth magazine, San Francisco. This international award honours organizations that reflect Margaret Mead's statement: "Never doubt that a small group of thoughtful, committed citizens can change the world" – January 2002
- International Regenerative Health Care Award by "Health Care Without Harm" an organization based in the US and Europe for "outstanding community healing work" and the Cleanmed Conference in Chicago – May 2009

== Material from Sambhavna ==
=== Medical ===
- Gupta A, Durgvanshi N. Yoga therapy in the care of chronic respiratory disorders among survivors of the December 1984 Union Carbide disaster in Bhopal. Presentation at the 3rd International Conference on "Yoga Research Traditions", Kaivalyadhjama, Lonavia, 1–4 Jan 1999.
- Gupta A, Durgavanshi S, Eckerman I. Effects of Yoga Practices for Respiratory Disorders related to the Union Carbide Gas Disaster in 1984 Presentation at the World Congress of Asthma on 19 October 1999
- Menstrual Problems Reported by Teenagers Registered at Sambhavna Clinic. Bhopal: Sambhavna Trust, 2000.
- Carlsten C. Critical Issues in Diagnosis and Treatment of Common Presentations in Bhopal India. Bhopal: Sambhavna Trust, 2000.
- Ranjan N et al. Methyl Isocyanate Exposure and Growth Patterns of Adolescents in Bhopal JAMA 2003;290:1856–57
- Assessing Exposure to Toxic Gases in Bhopal (Response) JAMA 2004;291:422
- Eckerman, Ingrid (2005). "Combining complementary medicine with western medicine - do we gain something?".
- Eckerman, Ingrid. "Combining "complementary medicine" with western medicin – do we gain something?" (PDF). Poster at 12th Regional Conference of Wonca Europe Florence, Italy 27–30 August 2006
- Markwardt R. Adding Injustice to Injury - Health Perceptions, Plurality and Power in the Ongoing Bhopal Disaster SIT India Health and Human Rights, spring 2013

=== Other ===
- The Bhopal Gas Tragedy 1984 – ? A report from the Sambhavna Trust, Bhopal, India. Bhopal: Bhopal People's Health and Documentation Clinic (1998)
- Dinham B, Sarangi S (2002). "The Bhopal gas tragedy 1984 – ? The evasion of corporate responsibility". Environment&Urbanization. 2002:14;89-99
- The Bhopal Marathon (2012) - produced by the Sambhavna Trust and the Bhopal Medical Appeal in the aftermath of the London Olympics, which attracted sponsorship from Dow Chemical. Contains much information and many personal stories of those affected. www.bhopalmarathon.org

== See also ==
- Bhopal disaster The Union Carbide Gas Tragedy in Bhopal, India 1984
- International Medical Commission on Bhopal (IMCB) 1994
- Satinath Sarangi
