= IIT Council =

Governing body of all the IITs

The Council of Indian Institutes of Technology, or IIT Council, is the governing body responsible for all of the Indian Institutes of Technology.

== Composition and Structure ==
The IIT Council comprises the minister-in-charge of technical education in the Union Government (as Chairman), three Members of Parliament, the Chairmen of all IITs, the Directors of all IITs, the Chairman of the University Grants Commission, the Director General of CSIR, the Chairman of IISc, the Director of IISc, the Joint Council Secretary of Ministry of Education, and three appointees each of the Union Government, AICTE and the Visitor. Under the IIT council are the Boards of Governors of each IITs.
