= Asha for Education =

Non-profitable organisation in the USA

- Formation: 1991
- Founder: V.J.P.Srivatsavoy, Deepak Gupta, Sandeep Pandey
- Type: 501(c)3 non-profit organization
- Registration no.: 77-0459884
- Headquarters: Walnut, CA
- Region served: USA
- President: Binay Pathak
- Revenue: $3.3MM (2019)
- Disbursements: $3.27MM
- Staff: 0
- Volunteers: 1,500+
- Website: https://ashanet.org/

Asha for Education ("Asha") is a registered 501(c)3 non-profit organization based in the United States.

== History and Mission ==
Asha was founded in 1991 by V.J.P.Srivatsavoy, Deepak Gupta, and Sandeep Pandey at the University of California, Berkeley.

The mission of Asha is "To catalyze socio-economic change in India through the education of underprivileged children."

As of 2019, there were 46 active Asha chapters globally, across the U.S., Canada, Europe and India.

Asha for Education is a 100% volunteer-driven organization. The Board of Directors are elected every two years and their names are available on the organization's website.

== Programs ==
Asha for Education works with 180 projects across 22 states in India. The projects vary in their focus areas, ranging from pre-primary schooling to professional education, and in locations ranging from urban slums to isolated rural areas.

Asha's programs for fundraising vary across chapters, and include the Team Asha training programs – which train Asha participants in distance running, biking, and completing triathlons and climbing treks. Since 2013, Asha has also put on an annual "Work An Hour" fundraiser across the organization, for which donors are requested to symbolically "work an hour" towards the cause of children's education by donating an hour's worth or more of their salary.

In 2020, Asha for Education disbursed $128K for its COVID-19 relief efforts and another $245K for the Amphan Cyclone relief efforts to Asha projects in India after raising funds for these causes through online fundraisers.

Since 1997, Asha for Education has disbursed over $45 million to date to over 400 project partners. In 2019, Asha for Education raised $3.3 million in revenue and disbursed $3.27 million to projects in India.

One of the founders of Asha for Education, Sandeep Pandey, started Asha Parivar in India.

== Awards and recognition ==
Asha for Education has attained a 98.59 score and 4-star rating on Charity Navigator, America’s largest and most-utilized independent evaluator of charities. Asha topped Charity Navigator's lists of 10 Slam Dunk Charities and 10 Charities Worth Watching in 2005 and 2007 respectively.

In 2013, the Indo-American Chamber of Commerce (IACC) awarded Asha for Education the 'Best Indian NGO in the US' award as part of the 2013 Indo-American Corporate Excellence awards (IACE). Asha for Education was also awarded the '2015 Times of India Social Impact Award' in the International Category.

In 2020, Asha was listed as a top nonprofit on Charity Navigator's 'COVID-19 Top Nonprofits' list.
