= Kota Harinarayana =

Indian aviation engineer (born 1943)

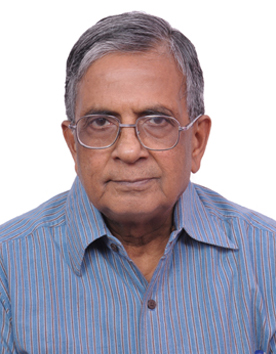
- Portrait of Dr. Kota
- Born: 1943 (age 82–83); Brahmapur, Odisha, British Raj

Kota Harinarayana (born 1943 in Brahmapur, Odisha) is an Indian aviation engineer. He was appointed as chairman of the board of governors of IIT (BHU), Varanasi by Hon'ble President of India on 25 August 2020 till 25 August 2023. He was the vice-chancellor of the University of Hyderabad and the president of the Aeronautical Society of India.

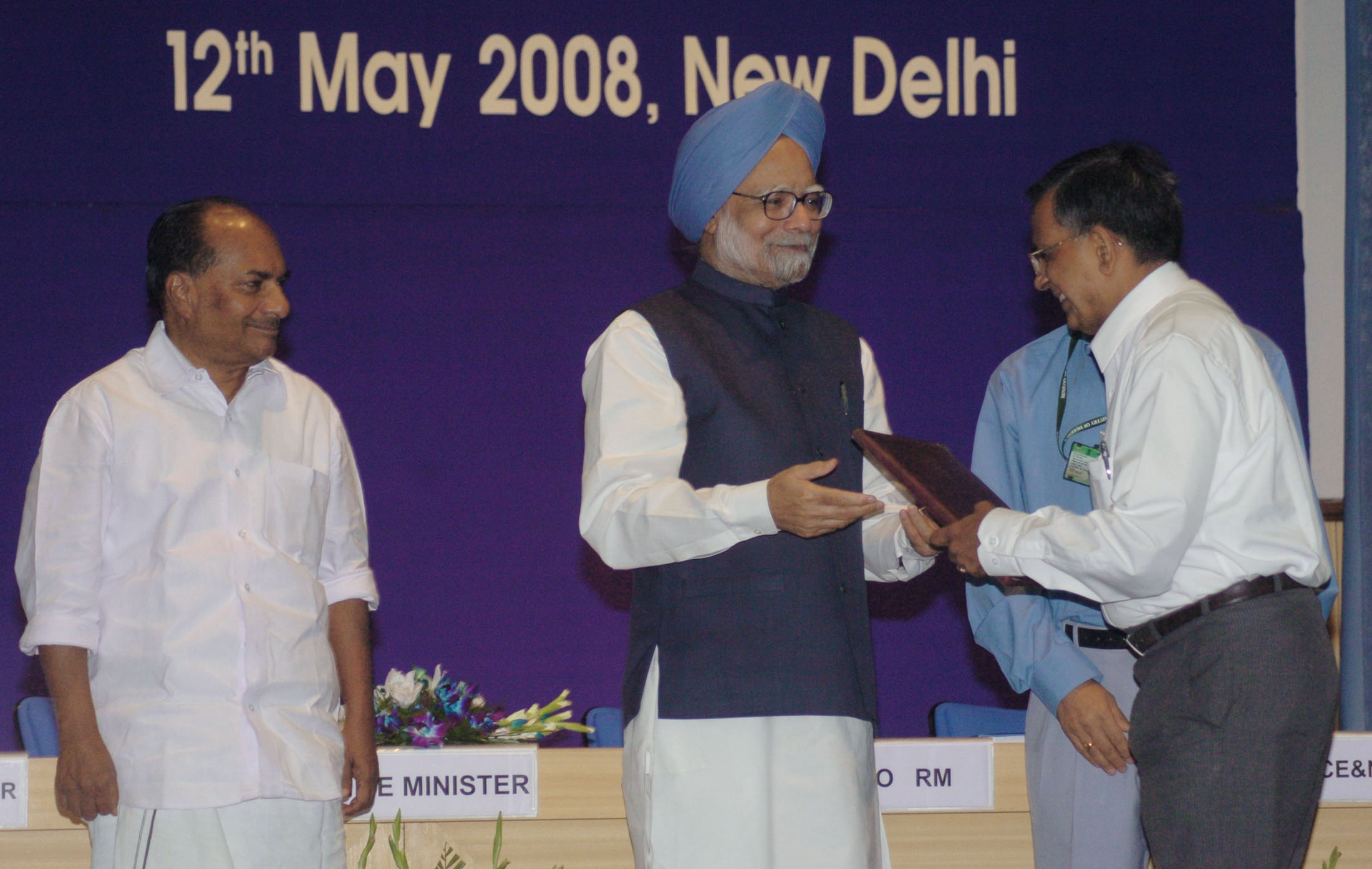
The prime minister, Dr. Manmohan Singh, presenting the Life Time Achievement Award-2007 to Dr. Kota Harinarayana at the DRDO award presentation ceremony, in New Delhi on 12 May 2008

He completed his schooling from City High School, Brahmapur. He obtained his bachelor's degree in mechanical engineering from Indian Institute of Technology (BHU) Varanasi in 1964, and received master's degree in aerospace engineering from Indian Institute of Science. He obtained his PhD from IIT Bombay. He also holds a bachelor's degree in law.

He was programme director and chief designer of India's Light Combat Aircraft (LCA) Tejas Programme.

== Startups ==
He is the Founder Chairman of General Aeronautics, a UAV startup incubated at Indian Institute of Science.

== Awards and honours ==
- Distinguished Scientist Award, Defence Research Development Organization, India
- Padma Shri, 2002
