= Zscaler =

American cybersecurity company

Zscaler, Inc.
- Formerly: SafeChannel, Inc.
- Type: Public
- Traded as: Nasdaq: ZS; Russell 1000 component
- Industry: Network security, computer security, Internet security
- Founded: 2007; 19 years ago
- Founders: Jay Chaudhry; Kailash Kailash
- Headquarters: San Jose, California, U.S.
- Area served: Worldwide
- Key people: Jay Chaudhry (CEO); Remo Canessa (CFO)
- Revenue: ▲US$2.17 billion (2024)
- Operating income: ▲US$−121 million (2024)
- Net income: ▲US$−58 million (2024)
- Total assets: ▲US$4.70 billion (2024)
- Total equity: ▲US$1.27 billion (2024)
- Number of employees: 7,348 (2024)
- ASN: 22616
- Website: www.zscaler.com

Zscaler, Inc. (/ˈziːˌskeɪlər/) is an American cloud security company based in San Jose, California. The company offers cloud-based services to protect enterprise networks and data.

== History ==
Zscaler was founded in 2007 by Jay Chaudhry and K. Kailash. The company launched its cybersecurity platform in 2008. In August 2012, Zscaler secured $38 million in funding from investors. The company's second funding round, led by TPG Capital, raised $100 million in August 2015. In March 2018, the company had an initial public offering (IPO) in which it raised $192 million. The company is traded on the Nasdaq using the symbol ZS. Zscaler stock was added to the Nasdaq-100 index on December 17, 2021.

== Zero Trust Exchange ==
Zscaler's Zero Trust Exchange platform features cyberthreat protection, data protection, zero trust connectivity, and business analytics. It was first announced at Zenith Live in June 2023.

In January 2024, the company announced Zscaler Zero Trust SASE (secure access service edge), enabling it to offer its first single-vendor SASE. It is built on the company's AI-powered SSE platform to securely connect users, locations, and cloud services through its Zero Trust Exchange. It also offers a cloud-based cybersecurity platform, Zscaler Internet Access.

== Acquisitions ==
Zscaler acquired the AI and machine-learning technology of TrustPath in August 2018; the browser security company Appsulate for $13 million in May 2019; cloud security posture management startup Cloudneeti in April 2020; and microsegmentation firm Edgewise Networks in May 2020. The company purchased cybersecurity startup Trustdome in April 2021; Indian cybersecurity startup Smokescreen Technologies in May 2021; and cloud security firm ShiftRight for $25.6 million in September 2022.

On February 14, 2023, Zscaler announced it would acquire Israeli application security company Canonic, a company focused on protecting against attacks that target software as a service. In March 2024, the company acquired Israel-based data security startup Avalor, which uses AI to analyze data in search of identifying security vulnerabilities, for $310 million; and network segmentation startup Airgap Network, for an undisclosed amount.

On May 17, 2025, Zscaler announced it would acquire Red Canary for an undisclosed amount. Red Canary is a US based provider of Managed Detection and Response services. In February 2026, the company announced it the acquisition of browser security company SquareX for an undisclosed amount.
