= Deepak Ahuja =

Indian-American executive (born 1963)

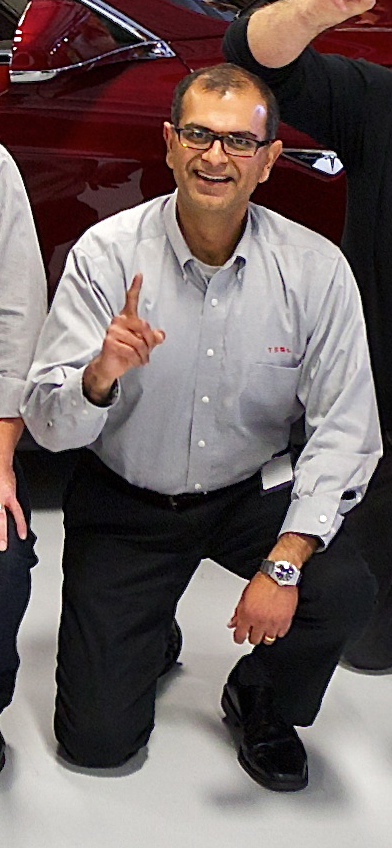
- Deepak Ahuja in 2012
- Born: January 1963 (age 63); Mumbai, India
- Education: IIT BHU; Northwestern University; Carnegie Mellon University
- Occupation: Chief Financial Officer
- Known for: CFO of Tesla, Inc.

Deepak Prabhu Ahuja (born on January 1963) is an Indian-American executive working in the life sciences industry who previously worked in the automotive manufacturing industry. He is best known for serving as the chief financial officer of Tesla for eleven years.

== Early life and education ==
Deepak Ahuja was born in the month of January in 1963 in Mumbai, India. He holds a bachelor's degree in ceramic engineering from the IIT BHU and a master's degree from the Northwestern University. Ahuja enrolled at Northwestern University in 1985, with his first class being taught by Morris E. Fine. He then also obtained an MBA from Carnegie Mellon University.

== Career ==
Initially Ahuja spent six years working for Kennametal near Pittsburgh. After completing his MBA in 1993 Ahuja moved to Woodhaven, Michigan, to accept a job with the Ford Motor Company. He became chief financial officer (CFO) of the AutoAlliance International joint-venture between Ford and Mazda. Ahuja then moved to become CFO of Ford in Southern Africa. He then returned to Michigan to act as controller of Ford's fuel-efficient small cars product development programme.

On 13 June 2008 Ahuja was offered the position of chief financial officer at Tesla Motors, reporting to CEO and president Ze'ev Drori. In 2015 Ahuja retired from Tesla, and then returned as chief financial officer again in February 2017 to replace Jason Wheeler. His retirement from Tesla after 11 years was announced on the Q4 2018 Tesla earnings call on January 30, 2019.

In January 2020, Ahuja joined Verily as its chief financial officer. In September 2022, it was announced that Ahuja would leave Verily and join Zipline as its first chief business and financial officer from September 30.
