= IIT (BHU) Varanasi =

Research Institute in Varanasi, India

Coordinates: 25°16′7″N 82°59′25″E

Indian Institute of Technology (BHU) Varanasi
- Seal of the IIT-BHU
- Former names: Banaras Engineering College (BENCO) (1919); College of Mining and Metallurgy (MINMET) (1923); College of Technology (TECHNO) (1932); Institute of Technology (IT-BHU) (1968)
- Motto: Saṃskāra hī śikṣā (Sanskrit)
- Motto in English: Education is Character
- Type: Public technical university
- Established: 1919; 107 years ago
- Chairman: Kota Harinarayana
- Director: Amit Patra
- Academic staff: 381
- Students: 7,980
- Undergraduates: 6,107
- Postgraduates: 828
- Doctoral students: 1,045
- Location: Varanasi, Uttar Pradesh, India
- Campus: 425 acres (172 ha) part of larger 1,300 acres (530 ha) BHU Campus; Urban
- Colours: Cannon Pink; Totem Pole
- Website: www.iitbhu.ac.in

The Indian Institute of Technology (Banaras Hindu University) Varanasi (IIT-BHU) is a public technical university located in Varanasi, Uttar Pradesh, India. It is ranked amongst the most prestigious engineering institutions in India. Founded in 1919 as the Banaras Engineering College, it became the Institute of Technology, Banaras Hindu University in 1968. It was later designated an Indian Institute of Technology in 2012. IIT (BHU) Varanasi has 16 departments, 4 inter-disciplinary schools and a Humanities & Social Sciences Section. It is located inside the Banaras Hindu University Campus.

== History ==
IIT (BHU) Varanasi has formerly been known as the Banaras Engineering College (BENCO), the College of Mining and Metallurgy (MINMET), the College of Technology (TECHNO) and the Institute of Technology, Banaras Hindu University (IT-BHU). Its establishment is intimately linked with that of the Banaras Hindu University (BHU). The first convocation ceremony at BHU was held on 2 December 1920. BHU has the credit of first starting degree classes in Mechanical Engineering, Electrical Engineering, Metallurgical Engineering, Mining Engineering and Pharmaceutics, thanks to the foresight of its founder, Pt. Madan Mohan Malaviya.

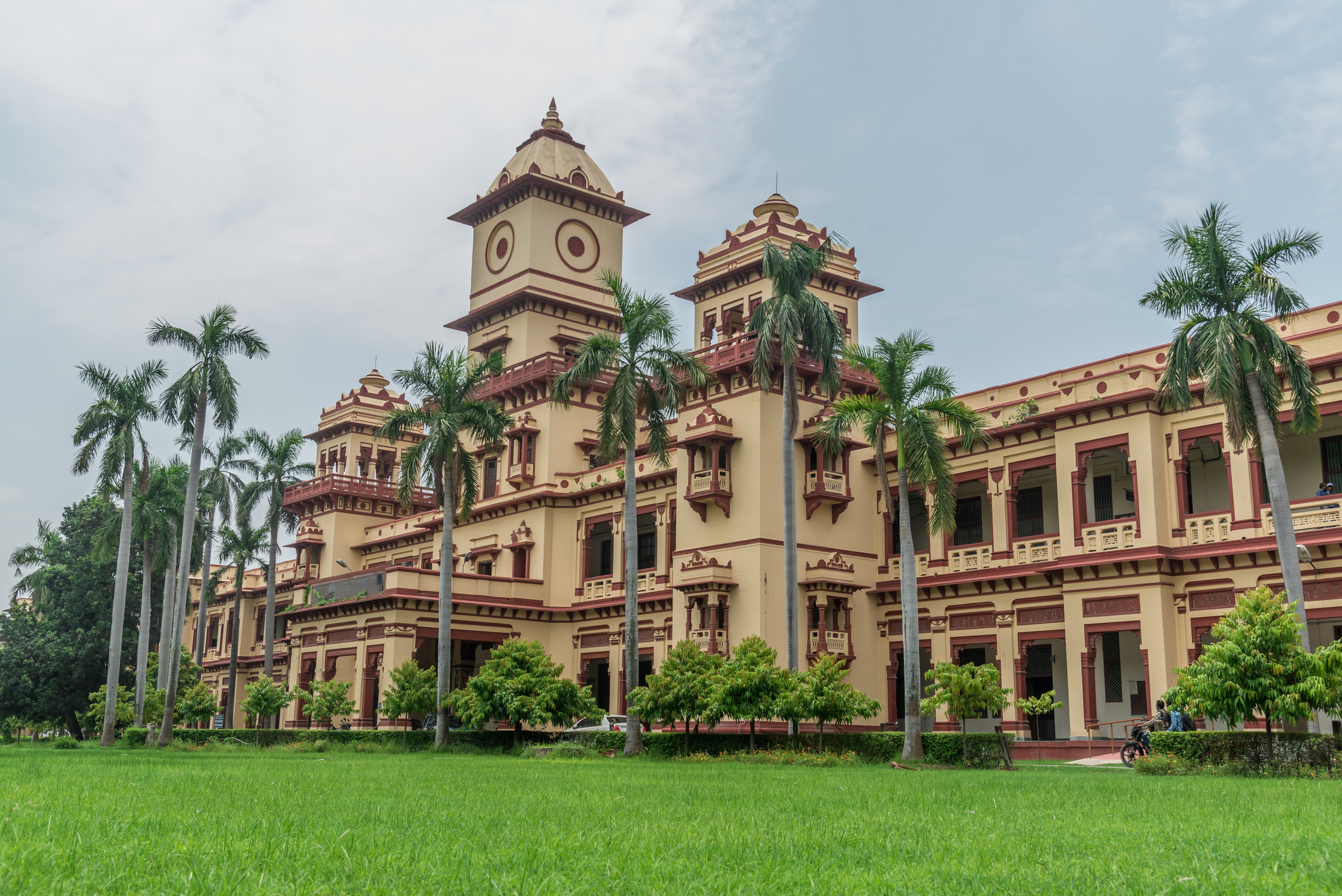
Department of Electrical Engineering IIT(BHU), Varanasi

The Department of Geology was started under BENCO in 1920. The Geology Department introduced courses in Mining and Metallurgy. The Department of Industrial Chemistry was started in July 1921. In 1923, Mining and Metallurgy were established as separate departments and in 1944, they were raised to the status of a college forming the College of Mining and Metallurgy (MINMET).

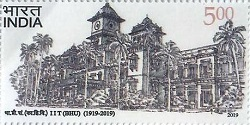
IIT (BHU) commemorated on a 2019 stamp of India.

In 1968, BENCO, TECHNO and MINMET were merged and the Institute of Technology (IT-BHU) was established integrating the departments of Mechanical Engineering, Electrical Engineering, Civil and Municipal Engineering, Mining Engineering, Metallurgical Engineering, Chemical Engineering and Technology, Silicate Technology and Pharmaceutics. The Department of Silicate Technology subsequently became the Department of Ceramic Engineering. A Department of Electronics Engineering was also established. The departments of Applied Physics, Applied Mathematics and Applied Chemistry were established in 1985.

The earlier system of regional admission based on merit lists was replaced in 1972 by admission through Indian Institute of Technology Joint Entrance Examination (IIT-JEE) for undergraduate courses and Graduate Aptitude Test in Engineering (GATE) for postgraduate courses. In the tenth meeting of the IIT Council in 1972, it was also proposed to convert the then IT-BHU into an IIT and a committee was appointed by the IIT Council for the purpose but because of political reasons, the desired conversion could not be achieved then.

In 2003, Committees constituted by MHRD (Professors Joshi and Anand Krishnan Committees) had recommended for the conversion of the Institute into an Indian Institute of Technology (IIT). On 17 July 2008, the government of India issued a press release granting "In principle approval for taking over the Institute of Technology, Banaras Hindu University – a constituent unit of the Banaras Hindu University, a Central University, its conversion into an Indian Institute of Technology and integrating it with the IIT system in the country." The BHU Executive Council approved the proposal of the HRD ministry to convert IT-BHU to IIT (BHU) Varanasi, retaining academic and administrative ties to BHU.

On 4 August 2010 a bill seeking to amend the Institutes of Technology Act 1961 to declare IT-BHU an IIT was introduced in the Lok Sabha by Minister of State for HRD, D. Purandeswari. The Lok Sabha passed The Institutes of Technology (Amendment) Act, 2011 on 24 March 2011 and the Rajya Sabha on 30 April 2012, thereby formalizing the IIT status of the institute. The Bill was signed by the President of India on 20 June 2012 and notified in the gazette on 21 June. The Department of Architecture, Planning and Design was set up in the Institute in collaboration with IIT Roorkee, beginning its academic activities in the session 2019–2020. The first cohort of students consisted of 20 students admitted into the five-year programme through the JEE Advanced exam.

The institute celebrated its centenary year in 2019–2020. It organized a global alumni meet and other cultural events during the celebration. The 80-year-old BENCO chimney was also re-erected to commemorate the institute's completion of a century.

== Organisation and administration ==
=== Governance ===
All IITs follow the same organisational structure which has the president of India as the visitor at the top of the hierarchy. Directly under the president is the IIT Council. Under the IIT Council is the board of governors of each IIT. Under the board of governors is the director, who is the chief academic and executive officer of the IIT. Under the director, in the organizational structure, comes the deputy director. Under the director and the deputy director, come the deans, the heads of various departments, and the registrar.

However, IIT-BHU has special provisions under The Institutes of Technology Act, 1961, where the executive council of Banaras Hindu University can nominate the Vice Chairman, as well as two members of the board. According to Kapil Sibal, the then HRD Minister, the purpose of such a system was to maintain the integrity of the Banaras Hindu University, and to maintain the linkage between the two (the university and IIT), and ensuring the cross-disciplinary research.

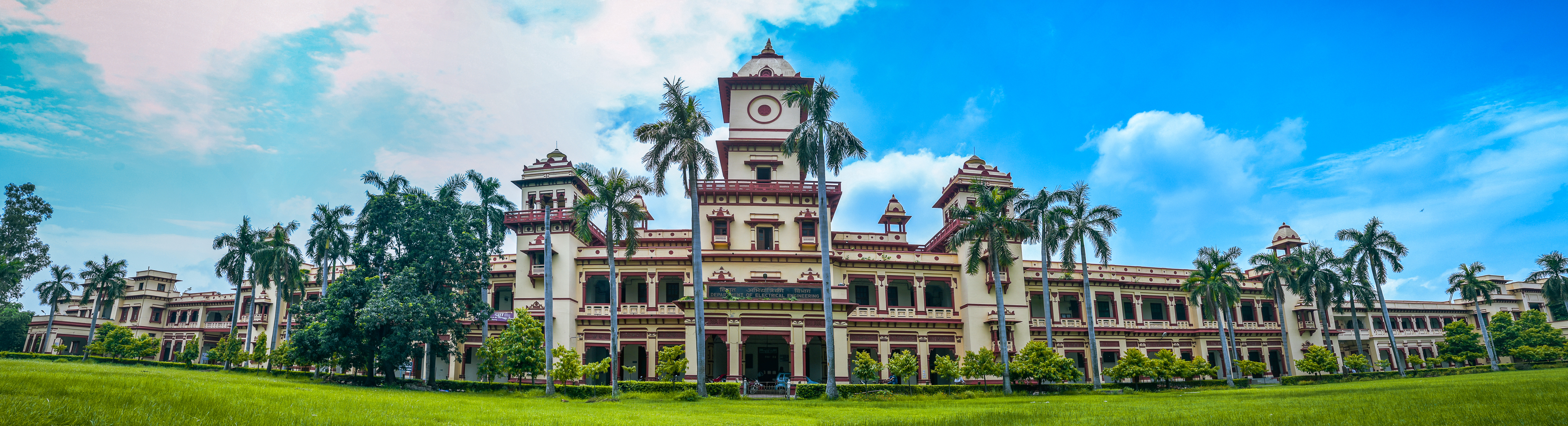
Department of Electrical Engineering IIT(BHU) Varanasi Panoramic View

=== Departments ===
Indian Institute of Technology (BHU) has 11 engineering departments, 3 science departments, 4 schools, and a humanities department:

Engineering Departments	Schools	Science Departments	Humanities Department
Architecture, Planning and Design; Ceramic Engineering; Chemical Engineering; Civil Engineering; Computer Science and Engineering; Electrical Engineering; Electronics Engineering; Mechanical Engineering; Metallurgical Engineering; Mining Engineering; Pharmaceutical Engineering & Technology	Biochemical Engineering; Biomedical Engineering; Materials Science and Technology; Naresh C Jain School of Decision Sciences and Engineering	Chemistry; Physics; Mathematical Sciences	Department of Humanistic Studies.; Courses are offered in: 1. English; 2. History; 3. Philosophy; 4. Linguistics; 5. Sociology

== Academics ==
=== Undergraduate programme ===
IIT (BHU) Varanasi offers four-year instructional programs for the degree of Bachelor of Technology (BTech) and five-year programs for Integrated Dual Degree (IDD). The IDD program offers both BTech and MTech degrees. Admission to all programs is expressly through the Joint Entrance Examination – Advanced conducted by the Indian Institutes of Technology. Earlier half of the intake for Pharmaceutical sciences was through JEE and the other half through BHU-PMT. But after the college was converted into an IIT, intake for BTech and the IDD in Pharmaceutical sciences (now Pharmaceutical Engineering and Technology) is exclusively through Joint Entrance Examination - Advanced.

=== Postgraduate programme ===
Postgraduate courses offer Master of Technology (MTech) and PhD degrees. Admissions to the MTech program are made through the Graduate Aptitude Test in Engineering (GATE) conducted jointly by Indian Institute of Science and Indian Institutes of Technology. For admission into the various PhD courses, one can apply through the official institute website. The application brochure is released on the same.

=== Admission ===
The admission of students to the institute is through JEE Advanced for undergraduate courses and Graduate Aptitude Test in Engineering (GATE) or Graduate Pharmacy Aptitude Test (GPAT) for postgraduate courses. From 2013, admission to undergraduate programs is based on a two-tier test called (1) Mains and (2) Advanced. In addition, the students qualifying through JEE (Advanced) need to be in the top 20 percentile of the respective categories and/or have secured 75% or above in the qualifying exam conducted by the boards of their respective state/UT.

=== Rankings ===
University rankings

General – international
- QS (World) (2025): 531
- QS (Asia) (2024): 271-280

General – India
- NIRF (Overall) (2024): 30

Engineering – India
- NIRF (2024): 10

Internationally, IIT (BHU) Varanasi was ranked 566th in the world by the QS World University Rankings of 2026 and 8th in India. It has shown exceptional performance in QS subject ranking 2026 with 7 of its subjects being ranked in top 300 in the world(including Civil,CSE,Chemical,etc.)

IIT (BHU) Varanasi was also ranked 10th among engineering colleges and 31st overall (in India), by the National Institutional Ranking Framework (NIRF) in 2025.

=== Library facilities ===
IIT (BHU) Varanasi Main Library comprises the Shreenivas Deshpande Library and five departmental libraries. The main library has a collection of books across streams in engineering, science, and technology, along with a host of books in humanities, social sciences, and literary fiction.

The library has about 1,42,000 volumes of books, journals, theses, reports, and pamphlets. Basic facilities like circulation, scanning, printing, and photocopying amenities are also available in this Wi-Fi-enabled library. The library has a sitting capacity of more than 600 students. The faculty and students can have access to these facilities by registering themselves.

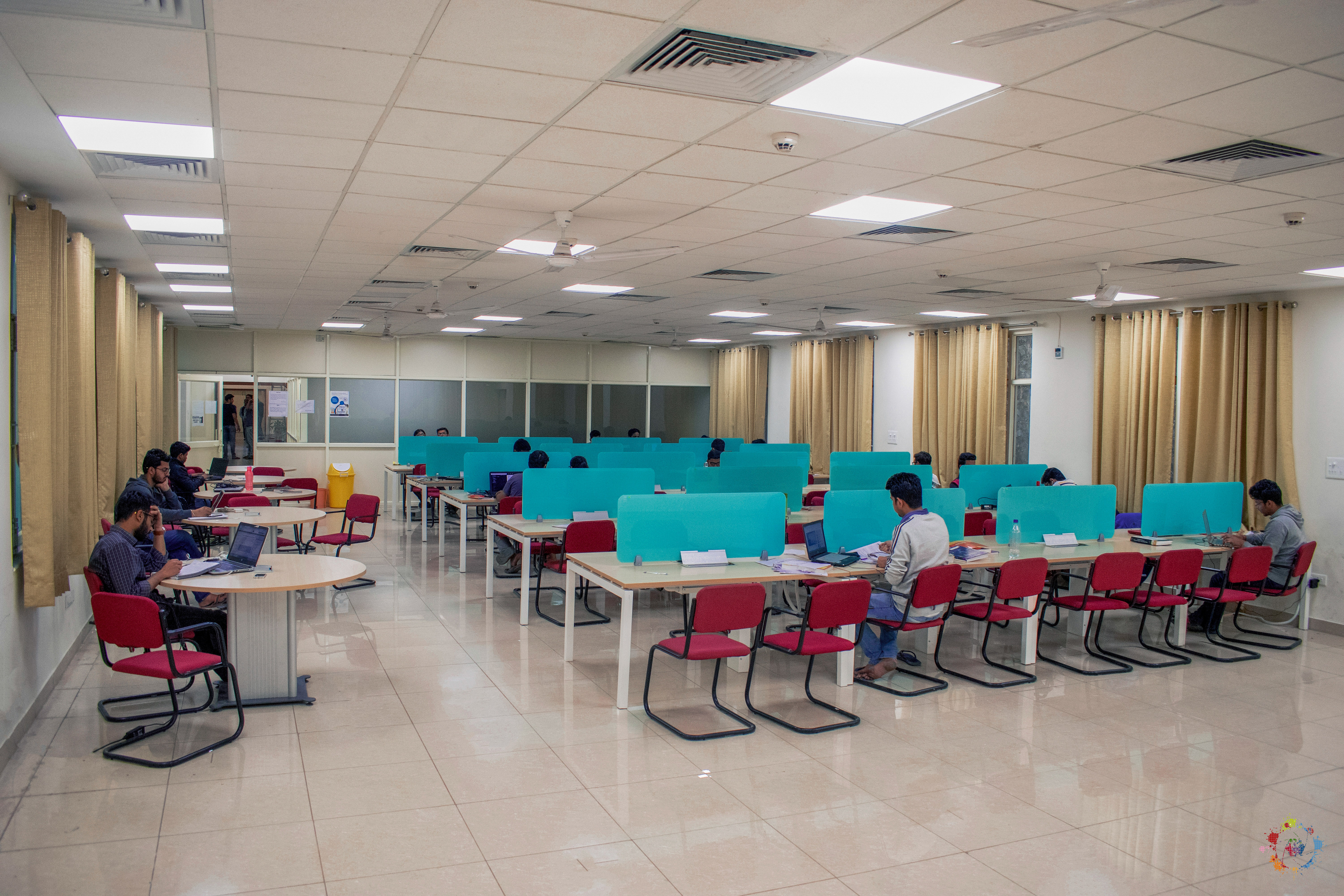
Reading Hall-I, Main Library, IIT (BHU)

The library permits access to nearly 10000 e-journals, 25,000 standards and more than 3,500 electronic books and databases. It has an excellent collection of bound volumes of old (Since 1918) and new periodicals, codes standards, etc. The library also maintains an online repository containing student thesis and publications, transcripts and event videos, available on the Institute intranet. Apart from this, students also enjoy access to the central and cyber library of Banaras Hindu University.

== Student life ==
=== Gymkhana ===
The IIT (BHU) Gymkhana, housed in Kings' Pavilion, is the primary hub of all extracurricular activities in the institute.

The Gymkhana functions through its five councils:

1. Games and Sports Council
2. Cultural Council
3. Science and Technology Council
4. Film and Media Council
5. Social Service Council

These councils are headed by their respective Counsellors who work in close coordination with the Dean (Student Affairs). On the student side, each council has a General Secretary and two Joint General Secretaries, with each club being headed by a Secretary and two Joint Secretaries. The councils also organize different festivals in the college annually.

=== Festivals ===
IIT BHU has four main student-organised festivals:

- Technex is the annual techno-management festival of IIT BHU and Asia's oldest techno-management fest.
- Kashiyatra is the annual socio-cultural festival
- Spardha is the annual sports festival
- FMC Weekend is the annual film and media festival

Apart from these, there are several departmental festivals, and events organized by student-run clubs. IIT BHU also participates in Banaras Hindu University's Inter-college festival Spandan which is held annually in February.

=== Institute Magazine ===
The institute newsletter, IIT BHU Connect is a bi-yearly magazine that features in-depth cover stories, recently organized events, adopted proposals, and technical advances and helps promote the Institute beyond the boundaries of the university. Having been initiated in 2016, six editions have been published so far which received mostly positive reviews. It is run by a student team of around twenty students with one Student Editor.

=== MCIIE ===
Malaviya Centre for Innovation, Incubation and Entrepreneurship (MCIIE) was established in 2008. The objective of MCIIE is to produce successful firms that will leave the program financially viable. Incubator tenants benefit from business and technical assistance and official affiliation with the incubator, a supportive community with an entrepreneurial environment, a direct link to entrepreneurs, and immediate networking and commercial opportunities with other tenant firms. The various programmes under MCIIE include:

- Open Learning Programme in Entrepreneurship (OLPE)
- Entrepreneurship Development and Awareness Programs
- Technology Business Incubator (TBI) sponsored by National Science and Technology Entrepreneurship Development Board, DST, New Delhi.

== Alumni ==
IIT (BHU) Varanasi has produced alumni who made a mark for themselves in the fields of technology, business, politics, and arts, among other fields. Alumni interactions are maintained by the Student Alumni Interaction Cell (SAIC) under the aegis of the Dean of Resources and Alumni. IIT BHU has multiple alumni organisations including IIT BHU Global Alumni Association (IBGAA) and the Association of IITBHU Alumni (AIBA).

Some notable alumni include:

- Nikesh Arora, CEO at Palo Alto Networks, Former President at Softbank, Ex-Senior Vice President and Chief Business Officer at Google.
- Anil Chakravarthy, incoming CEO of Adobe Inc.
- Deepak Ahuja, Former CFO at Tesla, Inc.
- Jay Chaudhry, CEO and Founder of ZScaler
- Krishan Kant, former Vice-President of India.
- Manoj Sinha, 2nd Lieutenant Governor of Jammu and Kashmir and Former Minister of State, Railways and Communication.
- Varun Grover, National Film Award-winning Lyricist and Songwriter. Famous for writing the songs of Gangs of Wasseypur.
- Thomas Anantharaman, one of the 3-member team at IBM who developed IBM Deep Blue supercomputer.
- Kota Harinarayana, a Padma Shri awardee and distinguished scientist at DRDO
- A B Pandit, Vice Chancellor Of Institute of Chemical Technology Mumbai
- Nikku Madhusudhan, Professor of Astrophysics and Exoplanetary Science of Institute of Astronomy, University of Cambridge

=== Alma Communiqué ===
The Alma Communiqué is the official alumni newsletter of IIT (BHU), Varanasi prepared by the Office of Dean (Resource and Alumni) and the Student Alumni Interaction Cell (SAIC). It is a monthly newsletter (previously bi-annual), which aims to apprise the alumni of the varioushappenings in IIT (BHU), Varanasi.

=== IIT (BHU) Chronicle ===
The IIT (BHU) Chronicle is a monthly e-magazine published by the IITBHU Global Alumni Association. It was first published in May 2005. It provides an account of events at the institute as well as notable achievements of members of the alumni community. It also publishes news and articles, sourced from several published sources, stating recent developments around the world. The magazine is published around the 25th of each month. It is emailed to over 11,000 alumni, students and faculty of the institute.

== Suicides ==
Several incidents of suicides have occurred at the IIT (BHU) in recent years.

- February 2024: A final-year B.Arch student was found dead in his hostel room, with the cause of death attributed to suicide. The student was reportedly suffering from depression.
- August 2023: A student of Pharmaceutical Engineering was found hanging in his room.
- June 2023: A research scholar of Mathematical Sciences committed suicide. His fellowship was about to end next month and his research work was in its final stages. The police reported that the reason behind his suicide was not clear.
- June 2022: An M.Tech. student of Mechanical Engineering was found dead in his hostel room, with the cause of death attributed to suicide. Police reported that he was worried because of not finding a job in campus placement.
- April 2017: A Dalit B.Tech. student of Mining Engineering self-immolated and subsequently jumped from the hostel building. Raju's family members suspected that his caste might have played a role in his death and feared that he may have been murdered.

== Controversies ==
IIT (BHU) has faced several controversies over the years, reflecting broader challenges in maintaining institutional standards and addressing systemic issues.

In October 2012, seven second-year students from IIT (BHU) were suspended following a ragging complaint filed by a first-year electrical engineering student. The complaint alleged that the student was subjected to severe harassment, including being made to strip. Cases of ragging in the institute have been reported earlier, too. In a similar case of ragging in June 2009, ten students were booked.

In April 2014, a professor from the Civil Engineering Department of IIT (BHU) was removed from service following allegations of sexual harassment by a final-year student. The student reported the incident to the women's grievance cell immediately. The professor challenged his removal, but in February 2015, the Allahabad High Court dismissed his plea, ruling that a broad establishment of facts was sufficient for termination.

In January 2016, a distressing incident emerged involving a Dalit student from IIT (BHU), who, faced with severe financial constraints, attempted to sell his kidney to cover his education loans. This case drew significant media attention and raised concerns about the systemic issues students from marginalized backgrounds face in prestigious institutions. Sensing trouble, a few of his friends told their former teacher Sandeep Pandey about the incident. Pandey collected money from IIT (BHU) alumni and paid off Mahesh's loan.

In January 2016, IIT (BHU) dismissed Professor Sandeep Pandey, a Magsaysay Award winner, citing national interest. The institute justified the expulsion by alleging that Pandey was influencing students in a manner deemed Anti-National and Pro-Naxal. Pandey contested this decision, arguing that his dismissal was politically motivated and linked to the Vice-Chancellor's alignment with RSS ideology. The dismissal followed a complaint from an M.A. Student of BHU, who was not related to any course Pandey taught at the IIT. The situation reached a legal resolution in April 2016 when the Allahabad High Court quashed Pandey's termination, declaring it unjustified and against natural justice. The court's ruling emphasized that the dismissal lacked proper adherence to legal and administrative procedures.

In October 2019, three IIT (BHU) students were arrested for allegedly attacking a fellow student with a rod. The incident was reported as a result of an altercation between the students, and the accused were taken into custody by the local police.

In February 2023, a controversy arose when it was revealed that the Department of Humanistic Studies rejected the only Other Backward Class candidate and did not admit any candidates from the Scheduled Castes and Scheduled Tribes categories in its PhD admissions for the Even semester of 2022–23. This raised concerns about the institution's adherence to the reservation policy, prompting discussions on potential biases in the selection process.

On 2 November 2023, around 01:30 AM, three men on a motorcycle harassed and gang-raped a girl student. Following this, massive protests broke out at IIT (BHU) demanding safety and security for students. On 31 December 2023, Varanasi Police arrested three accused who are said to be the officials of the BJP IT Cell.

In 2024, a case of corruption was unearthed in the Civil Engineering Department of IIT (BHU), Varanasi, involving fake meetings and cash incentives. Reports revealed misuse of funds and fraudulent activities in official proceedings, raising concerns over financial irregularities.

== See also ==
- Indian Institutes of Technology
- Indian Institute of Technology, Kanpur, another IIT in Uttar Pradesh
- List of educational institutions in Varanasi
- Banaras Hindu University(B.H.U.)
- Institutes of National Importance
