= C. Venkataraman Sundaram =

Indian chemical metallurgist

- Born: 7 November 1929; Ottapalam, Kerala, India
- Died: 15 August 2008 (aged 78); India
- Education: Indian Institute of Science
- Known for: Fast Breeder Test Reactor
- Awards: 1967 IIM Kamani Gold Medal; 1970 National Metallurgists' Day Award; 1979 VASVIK Award; 1985 IIM Platinum Medal; 1985 IISc Distinguished Alumnus Award; 1985 Sanjay Gandhi Award; 1985 INSA Syed Husain Zaheer Medal; 1986 Padma Bhusan; 2001 INS Homi Bhabha Lifetime Achievement Award; 2006 MoM Lifetime Achievement Award
- Scientific career
- Fields: Chemical metallurgy
- Workplaces: Department of Atomic Energy; Bhabha Atomic Research Centre; Indira Gandhi Centre for Atomic Research; National Institute of Advanced Studies; Institute of Minerals and Materials Technology
- Doctoral advisor: Brahm Prakash

Chokkanathapuram Venkataraman Sundaram (7 November 1929 – 15 August 2008) was an Indian chemical metallurgist, best known for the commissioning of the Fast Breeder Test Reactor at Kalpakkam. He was the director of the Indira Gandhi Centre for Atomic Research (IGCAR). He was a recipient of the Sanjay Gandhi Award for Science and Technology as well as the National Metallurgists Day Award and an elected fellow of the Indian National Science Academy, the Indian Academy of Sciences and the Indian National Academy of Engineering. The Government of India awarded him the Padma Bhushan, the third highest civilian award, in 1986.

== Biography ==
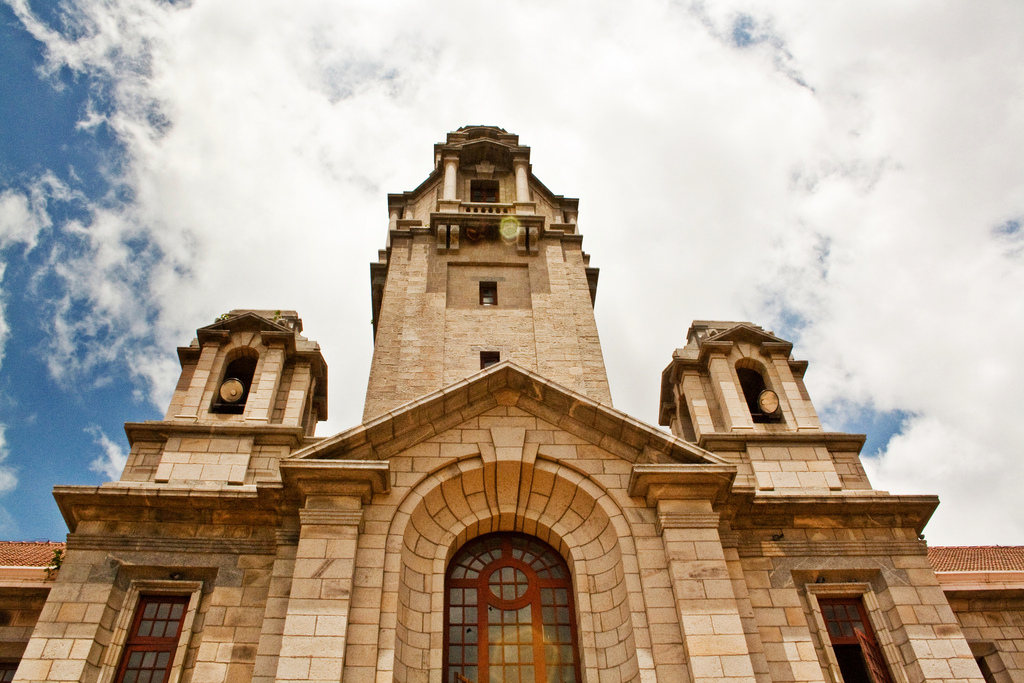
Indian Institute of Science

C. V. Sundaram was born on 7 November 1929 at Ottappalam, in Palakkad district of the south Indian state of Kerala. His doctoral research was at the Indian Institute of Science under the guidance of Brahm Prakash, a noted metallurgist who was a recipient of such honors as Padma Shri, Shanti Swarup Bhatnagar Prize and Padma Bhushan, which earned him a doctoral degree (DIISc) in 1952. (Note: His PhD reseacrh was in chemical metallurgy) In 1956, he joined the Department of Atomic Energy (DAE) where he was entrusted with the responsibility of the production of refractory metals. His next move was to Bhabha Atomic Research Centre as the head of the department of metallurgy in 1975 where he worked until 1982, when he was appointed as the director of Indira Gandhi Centre for Atomic Research (IGCAR). He served out his regular career at IGCAR and after retirement from official service in 1989, he continued his association with DAE as a consultant to the Nuclear Fuel Complex. Later, he moved to the National Institute of Advanced Studies, a centre of higher learning, as the Homi Bhabha visiting professor until his full retirement in 2001. In between, he did a short stint at the Regional Research Laboratory (present-day) Institute of Minerals and Materials Technology, as the chairman of its research council.

Sundaram died on 15 August 2008, at the age of 78.

== Professional profile ==
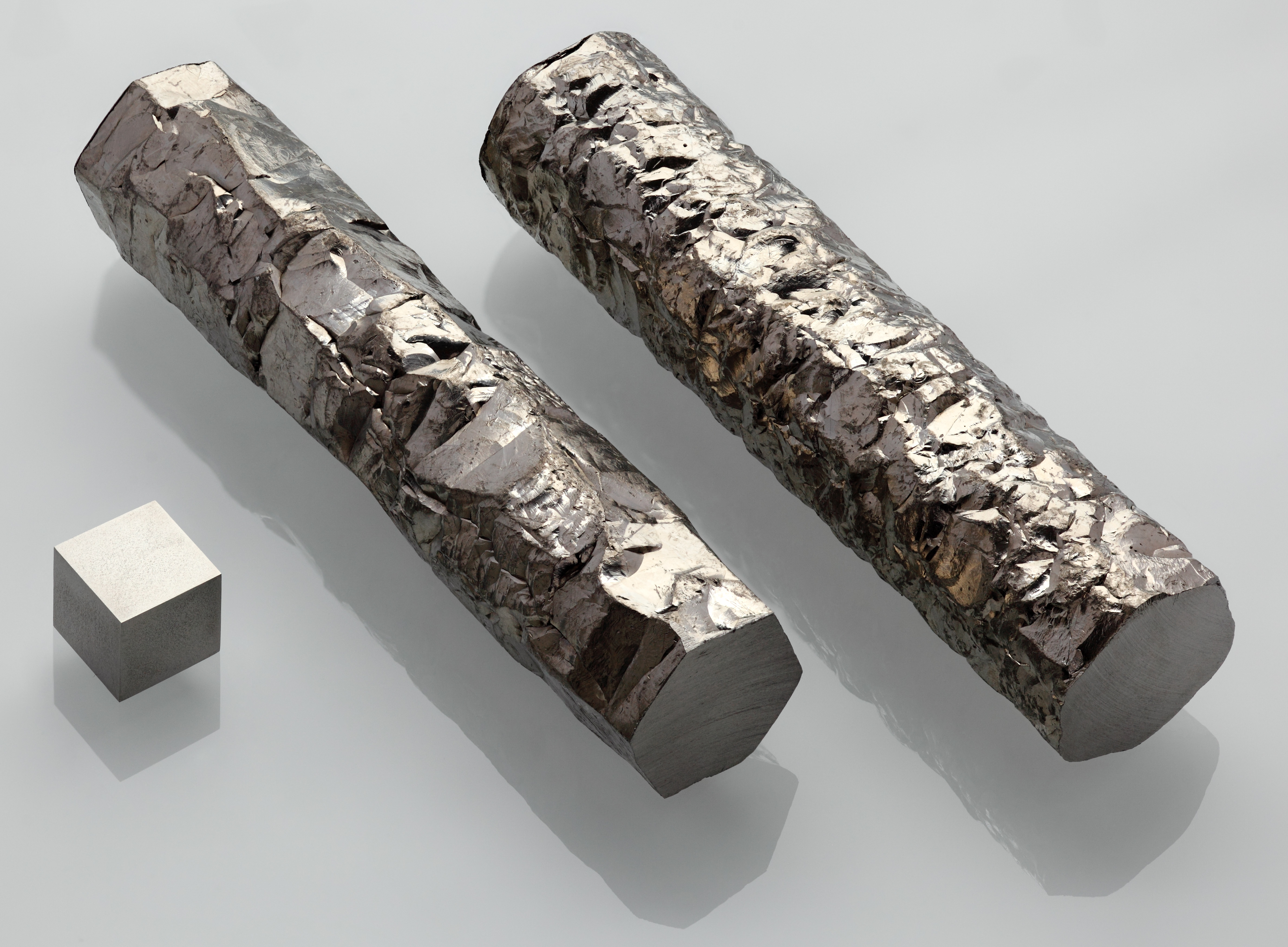
Zirconium crystal bar and cube

During his early years at the DAE, Sundaram was in charge of the production of zirconium, beryllium, titanium, tantalum and other refractory metals and he contributed to the establishment of a production facility at Nuclear Fuel Complex which produced zirconium sponge, niobium and tantalum metal products. He oversaw the project from research to production, including the setting up of a pilot plant. Later, when he moved to IGCAR, he took over the Fast Breeder Test Reactor (FBTR) project (Note: Fast Breeder Test Reactor is a sodium-cooled, plutonium-fuelled fast breeder test reactor) and it was during his tenancy as the director, the reactor reached criticality, in 1985. Subsequently, he guided the Prototype Fast Breeder Reactor project until his retirement.

Sundaram was a pioneer of extractive metallurgy in India. His studies have been documented by way of a number of articles. (Note: Please see Selected bibliography section) Besides, he published two books on science, Materials Technology: Challenges and Opportunities, published in 1995 and Atomic Energy in India, 50 Years, published by the Department of Atomic Energy in 1998. He also translated the Shivananda Lahari of Adi Shankaracharya into English. He was an honorary member of the Indian Institute of Metals and a regular member of the Metallurgical Society (USA). He served as the chief editor of the Transactions journal of the Indian Institute of Metals from 1972 to 1980 as well as the Metals Materials and Processes journal and sat in the editorial board of the Journal of Nuclear Materials. He also served as the president of the Indian Nuclear Society and the Indian Institute of Metals (1981–82).

== Awards and honors ==
The Indian Institute of Metals (IIM) awarded Sundaram, the Kamani Gold Medal in 1967; IIM honored him again in 1985 with the Platinum Medal in 1985, the same year as he received the Distinguished Alumnus Award of the Indian Institute of Science. In between, he received the National Metallurgists' Day Award in 1970 and the VASVIK Industrial Research Award in 1979. He received two more awards in 1985, the Sanjay Gandhi Award for Science and Technology of the Government of India and the Syed Husain Zaheer Medal of the Indian National Science Academy. The next year, he received the third highest civilian honor from the Government of India, the Padma Bhusan. The Indian Nuclear Society awarded him the INS Homi Bhabha Lifetime Achievement Award in 2001 and the Ministry of Mines of the Government of India selected him for the Lifetime Achievement Award in 2006. He was an elected fellow of the Indian Academy of Sciences (1974), the Indian National Science Academy (1979) and the Indian National Academy of Engineering.

== Selected bibliography ==
=== Books ===
- C. V. Sundaram; Srinivasa Ranganathan (1995). Materials Technology: Challenges and Opportunities. New Delhi: Indian National Academy of Engineering. ISBN 8170235677.
- C. V. Sundaram; L. V. Krishnan; T. S. Iyengar (1998). Atomic Energy in India, 50 Years. Government of India, Department of Atomic Energy.
- Shivananda Lahari. Translated by Sundaram, C. V. Gandhi Centre of Science and Human Values of Bharatiya Vidya Bhavan. 1999.

=== Articles ===
- C. V. Sundaram; N. Saratchandra. "Rare Metals Extraction in India". Bhabha Atomic Research Centre.
- C. V. Sundaram (1997). "Rare Metal Metallurgy in the Indian Atomic Energy Programme". Minerals and Metals Review. 23 (5): 87–90.
- C. V. Sundaram (1995). "Aspects of Beryllium Metallurgy - the Indian Experience". Journal of the Electrochemical Society of India. 44 (3): 7–18.

== See also ==
- Mineral processing
- Non-ferrous extractive metallurgy
