= Patcha Ramachandra Rao =

Indian metallurgist (1942–2010)

- Patcha Ramachandra Rao
- Born: 21 March 1942; Kavutavaram, Andhra Pradesh, British India
- Died: 10 January 2010 (aged 67); Madurai, India
- Education: Institute of Technology, Banaras Hindu University (now Indian Institute of Technology (BHU) Varanasi); Indian Institute of Science; Osmania University
- Spouse: Sudha Rao
- Children: Suparna Patcha Dandamudi; Animesh Patcha
- Awards: Shanti Swarup Bhatnagar Prize (1985); National Metallurgist Award (2004); Shanti Swarup Bhatnagar Gold Medal, INSA (2005)
- Scientific career
- Fields: Metallurgy, Material Science and Engineering,
- Workplaces: Institute of Technology, Banaras Hindu University (now Indian Institute of Technology (BHU) Varanasi); National Metallurgical Laboratory; Defence Institute of Advanced Technology
- Doctoral advisor: T.R. Anantharaman
- Doctoral students: Kamanio Chattopadhyay

Patcha Ramachandra Rao (21 March 1942 – 10 January 2010) was a metallurgist and administrator. He has the unique distinction of being the only vice-chancellor (2002–05) of the Banaras Hindu University (BHU) who was also a student (1963–68) and faculty (1964–92) at that institution. From 1992 to 2002, Rao was the director of the National Metallurgical Laboratory, Jamshedpur. After his tenure as vice-chancellor of B.H.U., in 2005, he took the reins of the Defence Institute of Advanced Technology (DIAT) as its first vice-chancellor. He was to serve DIAT until his superannuation in 2007. From 2007 till the end, Rao was a Raja Ramanna Fellow at the International Advanced Research Centre for Powder Metallurgy and New Materials, in Hyderabad, Andhra Pradesh.

== Early years ==
Rao was born on 21 March 1942 to S. R. Narayanaswamy Naidu and Laxmi Bai at Kavutavaram in the Krishna District of Andhra Pradesh. His father Narayanaswamy Naidu, was a government servant and retired as Deputy Registrar of Co-operative Societies while his mother, Laxmi Bai was also educated and studied up to matriculation when very few women were going to school. From his mother's side, Rao is the nephew of Narla Venkateswara Rao, a Telugu language writer, journalist and politician from Andhra Pradesh, Narla Gowri Shankar Rao, an assistant accountant-general (retired) in the Central Government of India, and Narla Tata Rao, a doyen of the power sector in India and a former chairman of the Andhra Pradesh State Electricity Board.

For the early part of his life, Rao's parents home-schooled him and admitted him to the seventh grade directly. He completed formal school at the early age of 13. Thereafter, he went on to study intermediate at the newly established Andhra Loyola College at Vijayawada and moved over to Osmania University, Hyderabad for higher education. At the young age of 19 years, in 1961, Rao graduated with a master's degree in physics from the Osmania University in Hyderabad India. Thereafter, in 1963, Rao graduated from the Indian Institute of Sciences, Bangalore, with a B.E. degree in metallurgy. During his second year at I.I.Sc Bangalore, Rao was supported by the Dorabji Tata Trust. His long association with the Banaras Hindu University (B.H.U) began soon afterwards, when his mentor T.R. Anantharaman encouraged him to enroll in the doctoral program at the Department of Metallurgical Engineering at B.H.U (now Indian Institute of Technology (BHU) Varanasi). Rao's pioneering doctoral dissertation in Rapid Solidification laid the foundation for the research in this area in India. He obtained his MSc in 1965 and PhD in 1968.

== Research contributions ==
Rao pioneered research activities in the area of rapid solidification, an area pertaining to the solidification of liquids at the rate of a million degrees per second, in India in the mid-1960s. Such a process leads to the formation of extensive solid solutions, metastable intermediate phases and metallic glasses. He was the first outside the United States of America to conduct research in this technologically important area. Rao discovered novel intermetallic phases and also the hitherto unexpected phases with 5-fold rotational symmetry. His interests then shifted to identifying the theoretical basis of the formation of such phases and he began to model their formation from a thermodynamic standpoint. Some of the expressions developed for the free energy of undercooled liquids are being used extensively by modellers. The techniques of rapid solidification which were once a matter of scientific curiosity have now been industrially exploited by the advanced countries in the form of novel metallic glass-based transformer core materials, fine grained high strength alloys, new hard magnetic materials etc. Many noteworthy contributions made by Rao, his students and erstwhile colleagues at the Banaras Hindu University have brought immense recognition to India as an important centre for rapid solidification studies.

In the past decade, Rao's interests shifted to the synthesis of materials by following routes which are very similar to those practised by living organisms. This new area of investigation aptly called biomimetics has the potential of avoiding environmental pollution and energy expenditure. Most methods operate at room temperature and ambient pressure. Prof. Ramachandra Rao and his students and colleagues have successfully synthesised calcium carbonate, calcium hydroxy apatite and some metallic nanocrystals through this route. The calcium hydroxy apatite has the potential for prosthetic applications. Animal studies involving rabbits have been conducted at the Banaras Hindu University. One of Rao's students has commercialised the apatite powders for dental applications.

Besides biomimetics he has also worked on ceramic materials and their production by self-propagating high temperature synthesis (SHS). Other routes for nanomaterial synthesis were also explored. Studies were also conducted on natural composite materials like bamboo and synthetic composites and steels.

Since retirement Rao had been pursuing theoretical studies involving the specific heats of about eleven metals which undergo the hexagonal to body centred cubic phase transformation. He and his associates had discovered some systematics in the thermodynamic properties of these metals but a real solution to the problem has evaded them for over 25 years.

=== Association with national and international bodies ===
Rao was a fellow of all four science and engineering academies of the country: Indian Academy of Sciences, Indian National Science Academy, National Academy of Sciences, India, and Indian National Academy of Engineering. He was also a fellow of The Academy of Sciences for the Developing World. He served in the council of Indian National Science Academy from 1996 to 1998 and was serving vice-president when he died.

He was also a fellow of the Institution of Engineers. He played pivoted role in the societies associated with his profession. He had served as president of the Indian Institute of Metals and vice-president of the Materials Research Society of India.

=== Awards and honours ===
Rao received numerous honours and awards. The prominent among them are Shanti Swarup Bhatnagar Prize for Science and Technology of CSIR in 1985, INSA Prize for Materials Science in 1997, National Metallurgist Award in 2004 and Shanti Swarup Bhatnagar Gold Medal of INSA in 2005. He received the Distinguished Alumnus Award of Indian Institute of Science as well as that of the Department of Metallurgy, Banaras Hindu University. He was a recipient of Nayudamma Award of CSIR in 1999. The engineering profession has recognised his contribution with Vasvik Award in 1997, Distinguished Engineer Award of Institution of Engineers and Om Prakash Bhasin Award in 1998. For his contribution to the first Indian space experiment, he was awarded Inter Cosmos Medal of USSR in 1984.

Rao was a Platinum Jubilee lecturer of Materials Science Section of Indian Science Congress at Goa in 1993, Prof. Brahm Prakash Memorial Lecturer at Indian Institute of Science in 2000 and both Daya Swarup and N.P. Gandhi Memorial Lecturer of the Indian Institute of Metals in 1998 and 2004 respectively.

== Personal life ==
=== Family ===
Dr. Rao was married to Sudha Rao in 1966. In his own words, "she has been a great support to me and let me pursue my professional life without any worry of running the family. She was herself an employee of Andhra Bank. She joined the Bank when it opened a branch in Varanasi at the beginning of 1980 and rose to become an officer."

== Positions held ==
- Professor, Department of Metallurgical Engineering and Coordinator School of Materials Science and Technology, Banaras Hindu University, Varanasi. (Now Indian Institute of Technology (BHU) Varanasi)
- Director, National Metallurgical Laboratory (CSIR), Jamshedpur
- Vice-chancellor, Banaras Hindu University, Varanasi
- Vice-chancellor, Defence Institute of Advanced Technology, Pune
- Emeritus scientist and Raja Ramanna Fellow at the International Advanced Research Centre for Powder Metallurgy and New Materials, Hyderabad

== Honors and awards ==
=== Awards ===
- Commonwealth Academic Staff Fellowship, 1970–71.Universities of Cambridge &Sussex
- National Metallurgist's Day Award, Min. of Steel & Mines, Govt of India, 1979;
- Interkosmos Medal, USSR 1984;
- Shanti Swarup Bhatnagar Prize, CSIR 1985
- Distinguished Alumnus Award, Metallurgy Department, BHU 1994;
- Distinguished Materials Scientist Award, IE(India) (1995)
- Indian National Science Academy Prize for Materials Science 1997;
- VASVIK Award 1997
- Om Prakash Bhasin Award 1998
- Distinguished Engineer Award, IE(India) (1998)
- Nayudamma Award (1999)
- Distinguished Lecturership Award, Materials Research Society of India, 1999–2001;
- Distinguished Alumnus Award, Indian Institute of Science 2001
- Federation of Indian Chambers of Commerce and Industry (FICCI), 1999–2000;
- Nijhawan Award for Best Technical Paper Published from NML in the year 2001
- MRSI-ICSC Superconductivity & Materials Science Prize, MRSI, 2002;
- Best Paper Award LERIG-2002
- Prof. P. Banerjee Award for best technical paper (Ferrous) published in Indian Foundry Journal (2001–2002)
- Loyola Ratna – Awarded by Andhra Loyola College, Vijayawada 2003;
- National Metallurgist Award, Min. of Steel & Mines, Govt of India, 2004;
- MRSI-ICSC Superconductivity & Materials Science Sr. Award, MRSI, 2005;
- Shanti Swarup Bhatnagar Gold Medal, INSA, 2005;
- Dr. Ramineni Foundation (USA) Vishishta Puraskar, 2007

=== Honors ===
- Platinum Jubilee Lecturer (1993), Materials Science Section, Indian Science Congress, Goa
- Dr.S.Roy Memorial Lecturer (1993), Jadavpur University, Calcutta
- Golden Jubilee Commemoration Lecturer (1996), Dept of Metallurgy, Indian Institute of Science, Bangalore
- 22nd Bhaikaka Memorial Lecturer (1996), The Institution of Engineers (India), Bangalore
- Prof. Brahm Prakash Memorial Lecturer (2000), Indian Institute of Sciences, Bangalore
- Prof.A.K.Seal Memorial Lecturer (1997), Indian Institute of Metals, Calcutta
- Prof.Daya Swarup Memorial Lecturer (1998), Indian Institute of Metals, Bangalore
- Professor N.P. Gandhi Memorial Lecturer (2004) of The Indian Institute of Metals.

=== Fellow ===
- Indian National Science Academy
- National Academy of Sciences
- Indian Academy of Sciences
- Indian National Academy of Engineering
- Institution of Engineers (India)
- Institute of Materials, Minerals and Mining
- The World Academy of Sciences, Italy
- Indian Institute of Metals
- Maharashtra Academy of Sciences

=== Member ===
- Materials Research Society of India
- Indian Science Congress Association
- Materials Research Society, USA

=== Honorary positions held ===
- President, The Asia-Pacific Academy of Materials (APAM), India Chapter
- President, Indian Institute of Metals
- Vice-president, Materials Research Society of India
- Vice-president, Indian National Science Academy, New Delhi.
- Sectional President, Materials Science Section, Indian Science Congress

== Patents ==
- A process for the production of nano-sized neodymium-iron –boron permanent magnet alloy powder (No.374/Del/94, dated 31.3.94) Patent filed in the USA also.
- An improved process for recovery of gold from aqueous pregnant solution using the protein of Strychnos potatorum (No.894/Del/95, dated 17.5.95)
- An improved process for production of aluminium dry cell (No.1809/Del/96, dated 14.8.96)
- An improved process to produce ceramic tiles using industrial waste such as iron ore tailings (No.1800/Del/96, dated 14.8.96)
- An improved cooling grate for use in oil/gas melting furnaces (No.1653/Del/97, dated 20.6.97)
- An improved composition for the preparation of refractory materials useful in oil/gas based melting furnaces and a process for the preparation of said refractory materials (No.1654/Del/97, dated 20.6.97)
- An improved furnace for melting metals (No.1652/Del/97, dated 20.6.97)
- An improved process for the preparation of zirconium boride (No.2129/Del/97, dated 31.7.97) Patent filed in the USA also.
- An improved process for the preparation of ceramic matrix composition (No.2267/Del/97, dated 13.8.97)
- An eco-friendly process for the enrichment of nickel, cobalt and iron content in lateritic nickel ore (No.3510/Del/97, dated 8.12.97)
- An improved process for the extraction of nickel, cobalt and iron from lateritic nickel ores (No.3511/Del/97, dated 8.12.97)
- An improved process for the production of high purity nano-crystalline alumina powders (No.1116/Del/98, dated 27.4.98)
- An improved process for the production of neodymium-iron-boron permanent magnet alloy powder (No.287/Del/99, dated 19.2.99)
- An improved process for super concentration of iron ore fines useful for making ferrites (No.334/Del/99, dated 25.2.99)
- A process for the recovery of gallium from Bayer process liquors (United States Patent 7338589, )
- A process for preparation of Fe-based ultrasoft Ferromagnetic alloys. (Indian Patent 267/DEL/2002) Patent filed in the USA also.

== Books & Publications ==
=== Books ===
- P. Ramachandra Rao, Shrikant Lele (1992). Thermodynamics of Materials. Cambridge Solid State Science Series. ISBN 978-0521373470.

== Sources ==
- Biography of the First Vice-Chancellor of DIAT Pune
- Chronicle Interview for Prof. P Ramachandra Rao
- List of Winners of S.S. Bhatnagar Award
- List of Winners of the VASVIK Award for excellence in Material Science and Technology
- History of Banaras Hindu University
- From the Vice Chancellors Desk
- Alumni Association Obituary Page
- Profile of Dr. Patcha Ramachandra Rao
- Obituary Notice
