= Kamanio Chattopadhyay =

Indian materials engineer

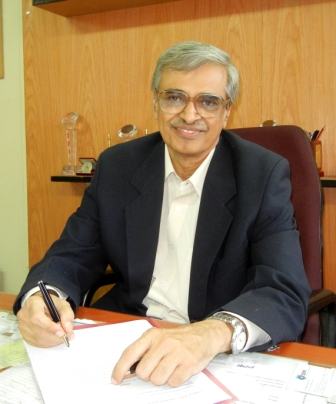
- Born: 3 March 1950 (age 76); West Bengal, India
- Education: National Institute of Technology, Durgapur; Indian Institute of Technology (BHU) Varanasi
- Known for: Discovery of decagonal nanoquantum quasicrystals
- Awards: 1979 INSA Young Scientists Medal; 1990 Materials Research Society of India Medal; 1995 Shanti Swarup Bhatnagar Prize; 1998BHU Platinum Jubilee Award; 2002 IISc Alumni Award; 2003 IIM G. D. Birla Gold medal; 2009 National Metallurgists' Day Award; 2011 EMSI Lifetime Achievement Award
- Scientific career
- Fields: Physical metallurgy; Material engineering
- Workplaces: Indian Institute of Technology (BHU) Varanasi; Carnegie Mellon University; Indian Institute of Science; Tohoku University; Kyoto University; Oxford University; Cambridge University; University of Illinois
- Doctoral advisor: Patcha Ramachandra Rao

Kamanio Chattopadhyay (born 3 March 1950) is an Indian materials engineer and an honorary professor at the Indian Institute of Science, Bengaluru. He is the chair of the Mechanical Sciences Division of IISc and a former chair of the Department of Materials Engineering.

Chattopadhyay is best known for his discovery of decagonal nanoquantum quasicrystals which he accomplished in 1985, along with L. Bendersky and S. Ranganathan. He is also credited with researches on synthesis and characterization of quasicrystals and nanocomposites and is an elected fellow of all the three major Indian science academies viz. Indian Academy of Sciences, Indian National Science Academy and National Academy of Sciences, India as well as the Indian National Academy of Engineering. The Council of Scientific and Industrial Research, the apex agency of the Government of India for scientific research, awarded him the Shanti Swarup Bhatnagar Prize for Science and Technology, one of the highest Indian science awards for his contributions to Engineering Sciences in 1995. (Note: Long link - please select award year to see details)

== Biography ==
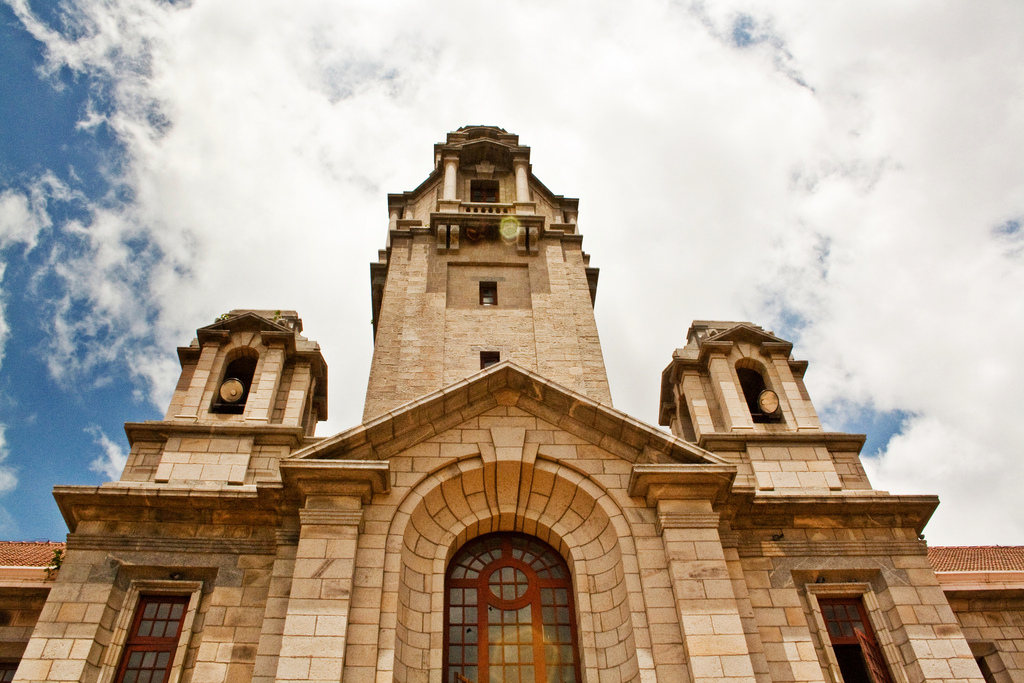
Indian Institute of Science

Born on 3 March 1950 in the Indian state of West Bengal, K. Chattopadhyay completed his graduate studies in mechanical engineering from the Regional Engineering College, Durgapur (present-day National Institute of Technology, Durgapur) of Burdwan University in 1974 and moved to Indian Institute of Technology (BHU) Varanasi where he did his master's degree in 1973. Subsequently, he enrolled for his doctoral studies there under the guidance of Patcha Ramachandra Rao, a Shanti Swarup Bhatnagar laureate, and during the course of his research, he joined BHU as a lecturer in 1975. After securing a PhD in 1978, he relocated to the US for his post-doctoral studies which he completed at the laboratory of Hubert Aaronson of Carnegie Mellon University. Returning to India in 1983, he joined the Indian Institute of Science as an assistant professor where he served out his regular service till his superannuation in 2015. During this period, he served as the chair of the Materials Research Centre from 2000 to 2004, as the chair of the Department of Materials Engineering from 2004 to 2008, as the convenor of the Institute Nano Science Initiative from 2007 to 2010 and as the chair of the Division of Mechanical Sciences during 2008–2015. Post-retirement, he continues his association with IISc in various capacities; he is associated with the research activities of the Centre for Nano Science and Engineering (CeNSE), heads the Advanced Facility for Electron Microscopy as its convenor since 2010, serves as the convenor of Interdisciplinary Centre for Energy Research since 2012, and is the head of the Non Equilibrium Processing and Nano Materials Group. In between, he had several stints abroad and the visiting research professorship at Carnegie Mellon University, visiting professorships at the Cooperative Research and Development Center for Advanced Materials of Tohoku University and Kyoto University and visiting scientist assignments at University of Oxford, University of Cambridge and University of Illinois are some of them.

Chattopadhyay is married to Sukanya and the couple lives in Bengaluru.

== Legacy ==
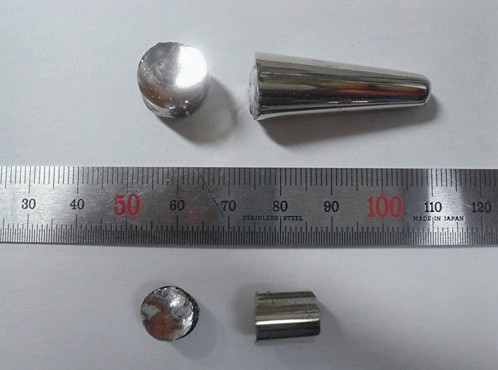
Bulk Metallic Glass Samples

The early researches of Chattopadhyay during his doctoral studies with Ramachandra Rao were on rapid solidification of aluminum alloys and it was during this time he is reported to have discovered aluminum-based binary glass and nanodispersed composites. Later, at Carnegie Mellon University, he worked along with Hubert Aaronson, on growth of bainite in Cu-Zn system and the related controversy and he continued his work after his return to India, collaborating with L. Bendersky and S. Ranganathan which led to the discovery of decagonal quasicrystals in 1985. His work, both experimental and theoretical, assisted in the synthesis and characterization of several quasicrystals and nanocomposites. He is also credited with wider studies in synthesis of nanocomposites, phase transformations, large superheating phenomenon during melting, dissimilar joining processes, surface modifications and nanostructured magnetic alloys. Later, he shifted his focus to the development of high temperature aluminum alloys and steel which has applications in aerospace and energy industries as well as ultrahigh strength multi-component alloys like bulk metallic glasses that are ductile. His researches have been documented in several peer-reviewed articles; (Note: Please see Scientific articles section) Google Scholar and ResearchGate, online repositories of scientific articles, have listed 407 and 360 of them respectively. Besides, he has authored one book, Aluminum Based Nanoeutectics: Synthesis and Microstructure and has contributed chapters to books edited by others. He also holds a number of patents which include those on Solder compositions, Nickel-Aluminium-Zirconium alloys and High Impact Solder Toughness Alloy.

Chattopadhyay is the co-director of Solar Energy Research Institute for India and United States (SERIIUS), an Indo-US joint venture for the development of low cost solar electric technologies, and has conducted a number of seminars and symposia on behalf of the consortium. He is involved in many inter-institutional exchange programs which include the research associations of Indian Institute of Science with Cambridge University and Exeter University. He is the coordinator of the National Microgravity Research Programme (NMRP), a multidisciplinary research forum of the Indian Space Research Organization for advanced research in Microgravity science. He is a member of the National Steering Committee of the Indian Institute of Metals and served as its vice president during 2012-13 and as the president for the term 2013–14. He co-chaired the 11th Asian Microgravity Symposium–2016 held at Hokkaido University, Japan and sat in the advisory committees of the International Conference on Metals and Materials Research organized by the Indian Indian Institute of Science, held in June 2016 and the International Symposium on Energy Materials : Opportunities and Challenges (ISEM-2011) held at Central Glass and Ceramic Research Institute, Kolkata in March 2011. Besides mentoring a number of master's and doctoral scholars in their studies, he has delivered invited or keynote addresses at several conferences which include Fifth International Conference on Solidification Science and Processing, International Workshop on Advanced Co-based Superalloys: 3.0 and International Conference on Functional Nanomaterials and he is a speaker designate at the TMS Annual Meeting and Exhibition to be held in March 2017 at San Diego, California. He is a former editor of the Journal of Materials Science of Springer Science+Business Media and is a member of the Board of Trustees of T. R. Anantharaman Education and Research Foundation, a Hyderabad-based non-profit organization promoting human resource development in engineering sciences.

=== Books ===
- Kamanio Chattopadhyay (2010). Aluminum Based Nanoeutectics: Synthesis and Microstructure. PN. ASIN B00R90079I.

=== Chapters ===
- Kamanio Chattopadhyay; Prajina Bhattacharya (2003). "Studies on Materials with Embedded Nanoscale Particles". Materials Research: Current Scenario and Future Projections. Allied Publishers. pp. 130–. ISBN 978-81-7764-450-0.
- Kamanio Chattopadhyay; Vitoria Bhattacharya (2003). "Nano-embedded Materials: A Canvas for New Materials Design". Advanced Materials Proceedings of the Indo-Malaysian Joint Workshop(WAM-2002). Allied Publishers. pp. 1–. ISBN 978-81-7764-479-1.

=== Scientific articles ===
- Vidya Kochat, Chandra Sekhar Tiwary, Tathagata Biswas, Gopalakrishnan Ramalingam, Kimberly Hsieh, Kamanio Chattopadhyay, Srinivasan Raghavan, Manish Jain, Arindam Ghosh (2016). "Magnitude and Origin of Electrical Noise at Individual Grain Boundaries in Graphene". Nano Letters. 16 (1): 562–567. Bibcode:2016NanoL..16..562K. doi:10.1021/acs.nanolett.5b04234. PMID 26632989.
- Chandra Sekhar Tiwary, Sharan Kishore, Suman Sarkar, Debiprosad Roy Mahapatra, Pulickel M. Ajayan, Kamanio Chattopadhyay (May 2015). "Morphogenesis and mechanostabilization of complex natural and 3D printed shapes". Science Advances. 1 (4) e1400052. Bibcode:2015SciA....1E0052T. doi:10.1126/sciadv.1400052. PMC 4640649. PMID 26601170.
- Chandra Sekhar Tiwary, Akash Verma, Sanjay Kashyp, Krishanu Biswas, Kamanio Chattopadhyay (April 2013). "Preparation of Freestanding Zn Nanocrystallites by Combined Milling at Cryogenic and Room Temperatures". Metallurgical and Materials Transactions A. 44 (4): 1917–1924. Bibcode:2013MMTA...44.1917T. doi:10.1007/s11661-012-1508-7. S2CID 135540902.
- Kirtiman Deo Malviya, Chandan Srivastava and K. Chattopadhyay (April 2015). "Phase formation and stability of alloy phases in free nanoparticles: some insights". RSC Advances. 5 (4): 35541–35550. Bibcode:2015RSCAd...535541M. doi:10.1039/C5RA03924J.
- Byung Joo Park, Hye Jung Chang, Do Hyang Kim, Won Tae Kim, Kamanio Chattopadhyay, T. A. Abinandanan, Saswata Bhattacharyya (June 2006). "Phase Separating Bulk Metallic Glass: A Hierarchical Composite". Physical Review Letters. 96 245503. Bibcode:2006PhRvL..96x5503P. doi:10.1103/PhysRevLett.96.245503. PMID 16907253.
- Gandham Phanikumar, Pradip Dutta, Rolf Galun, Kamanio Chattopadhyay (2004). "Microstructural evolution during remelting of laser surface alloyed hyper-monotectic Al–Bi alloy". Materials Science and Engineering A. 371 (1–2): 91–102. doi:10.1016/j.msea.2003.09.071.
- Tania Bhatia, Kamanio Chattopadhyay, Vikram Jayaram (August 2001). "Effect of Rapid Solidification on Microstructural Evolution in MgO–MgAl2O4". Journal of the American Ceramic Society. 84 (8): 1873–1880. doi:10.1111/j.1151-2916.2001.tb00929.x.
- K. Chattopadhyay, S. Ranganathan, G.N. Subbanna, N. Thangaraj (June 1985). "Electron microscopy of quasi-crystals in rapidly solidified Al-14% Mn alloys". Scripta Metallurgica. 19 (6): 767–771. doi:10.1016/0036-9748(85)90042-0.
- Kirtiman Deo Malviya and Kamanio Chattopadhyay (2014). "Synthesis and Mechanism of Composition and Size Dependent Morphology Selection in Nanoparticles of Ag–Cu Alloys Processed by Laser Ablation Under Liquid Medium". J. Phys. Chem. C. 118 (24): 13228–13237. doi:10.1021/jp502327c.

=== General articles ===
- Kamanio Chattopadhyay (18 August 2016). "Innovations in Science and Engineering: Lessons from History and Personal experience from the perspective of a Materials Engineer" (PDF). Beyond the Walls - A lecture series by distinguished alumni members. NIT Durgapur Alumni Association.
- Kamanio Chattopadhyay (January 2006). "Training Young Minds for Nanoscience and Technology: Issues and Challenges". MRS Proceedings. 931 (KK05–07): 129–143. doi:10.1557/PROC-0931-KK05-07.

=== Patents ===
- Ranjit Pandher, Bawa Singh, Siuli Sarkar, Sujatha Chegudi, Anil K.N. Kumar, Kamanio Chattopadhyay, Dominic Lodge, Morgana de Avila Ribas (26 May 2016). "High Impact Solder Toughness Alloy". Patent No. 20160144462. Justia Patents.
- Chandrasekhar Tiwary, Sanjay Kashyap, Olu Emmanuel Femi, Dipankar Banerjee, Kamanio Chattopadhyay (15 October 2015). "Nickel-Aluminium-Zirconium alloys". Patent No. 20150292062. Justia Patents.
- Morgana de Avila Ribas, Dominic Lodge, Ranjit Pandher, Bawa Singh, Ravindra M. Bhatkal, Rahul Raut, Siuli Sarkar, Kamanio Chattopadhyay, Proloy Nandi (17 July 2014). "Solder compositions". Patent No. 20140199115. Justia Patents.

== Awards and honors ==
Chattopadhyay received the first major award of his career in 1979 when he was chosen for the Young Scientists Medal by the Indian National Science Academy. He received the MRSI Medal of the Materials Research Society of India in 1990 and the Council of Scientific and Industrial Research awarded him the Shanti Swarup Bhatnagar Prize, one of the highest Indian science awards in 1995. He received the Platinum Jubilee Award of Banaras Hindu University in 1998 and the Alumni Award for Excellence in Research in Science/Engineering of the Indian Institute of Science in 2002. A year later, the Indian Institute of Metals chose him for the 2003 G. D. Birla Gold medal. The Government of India awarded him the National Metallurgists' Day Award in R&D and Academia category in 2009 and he received the Lifetime Achievement Award of the Electron Microscope Society of India in 2011.

The Indian Academy of Sciences elected Chattopadhyay as a fellow in 1995 and he became a fellow of the Indian National Science Academy in 1996 with the National Academy of Sciences, India following suit in 1999. The Electron Microscope Society of India chose him as a fellow in 2009 and the Indian Institute of Metals made him an honorary life member in 2014. He is also an elected fellow of the Indian National Academy of Engineering. Non-Equilibrium Processing and Nanomaterials Laboratory of the Indian Institute of Science felicitated him in 2015, on his retirement from service, with a seminar and the screening of a Metallurgist's Diary, a 20-minute long documentary on the life and work of Chattopadhyay made by his students at IISc.

== See also ==
- Amorphous metal
- Nanomaterials
- Arindam Ghosh
- Dan Shechtman
