= Dipankar Banerjee (metallurgist) =

Indian physical metallurgist and materials engineer (born 1952)

- Born: 15 February 1952 (age 74); West Bengal, India
- Education: IIT Madras; Indian Institute of Science; Carnegie Mellon University
- Known for: Studies on Titanium alloys
- Awards: 1987 IIM National Metallurgist's Day Award; 1987 DRDO Scientist of the Year Award; 1993 Shanti Swarup Bhatnagar Prize; 2001 MRSI Superconductivity Prize; 2003 IITM Distinguished Alumnus Award; 2005 Padma Shri; 2008 DRDO Technology Leadership Award; 2011 INAE Professor Jai Krishna Memorial Award; 2014 DRDO Life time Achievement Award
- Scientific career
- Fields: Physical metallurgy; Material engineering
- Workplaces: Los Alamos National Laboratory; General Electric Research Laboratory; Defence Research & Development Organization

Dipankar Banerjee (born 15 February 1952) is an Indian physical metallurgist, materials engineer and a former chief controller of R&D at the Defence Research and Development Organization (DRDO). Known for his studies on titanium alloys, Banerjee is an elected fellow of all the three major Indian science academies namely Indian Academy of Sciences, Indian National Science Academy and National Academy of Sciences, India as well as the Indian National Academy of Engineering. The Council of Scientific and Industrial Research, the apex agency of the Government of India for scientific research, awarded him the Shanti Swarup Bhatnagar Prize for Science and Technology, one of the highest Indian science awards for his contributions to Engineering Sciences in 1993. (Note: Long link - please select award year to see details) He received the fourth highest Indian civilian honour of Padma Shri from the Government of India in 2005.

== Biography ==
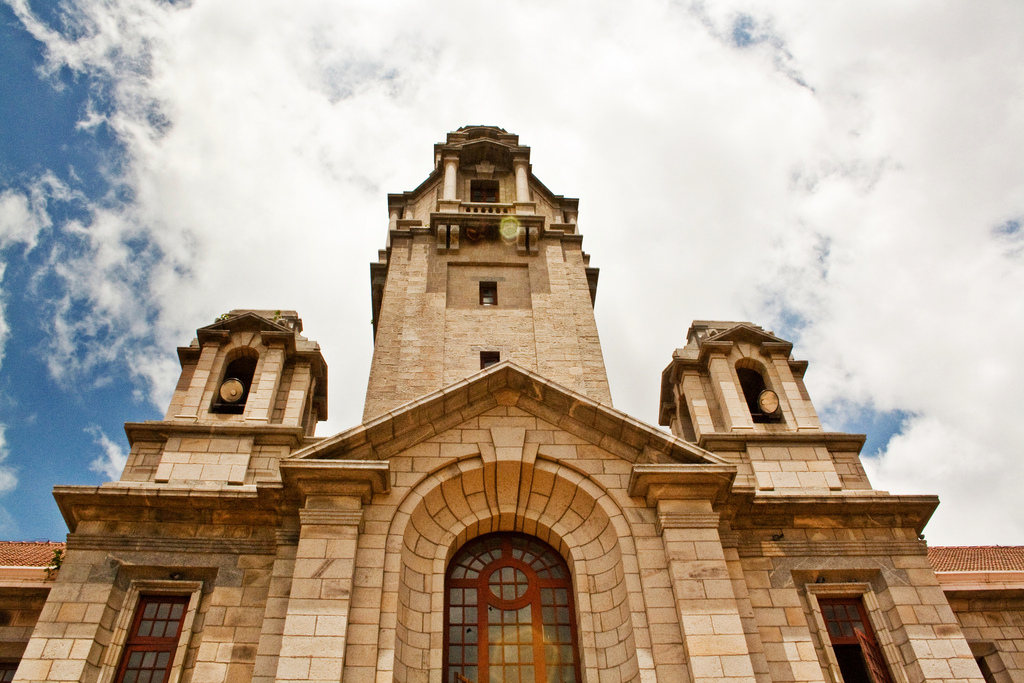
IISc - Main Building

Born on 15 February 1952, Dipankar Banerjee graduated in metallurgical engineering from the Indian Institute of Technology, Madras in 1974. After gaining a master's degree, he pursued his doctoral studies at the Indian Institute of Science (IISc) to earn a PhD in 1979. His post-doctoral work was at the Aeronautical Research and Development Board of India of the Defence Research and Development Organization (DRDO) as a research fellow and after completing the work, he started his career at the Defence Metallurgical Research Laboratory (DMRL) of DRDO in 1979. He became the director of DMRL in 1996 and held the position until 2003 when he was appointed as the chief controller of research and development of DRDO, overseeing the aeronautical and materials programs of the organization. In 2010, he returned to his alma mater, the IISc, as a professor at the Department of Materials Engineering and heads the Processing, Structure and Properties of Materials Laboratory (PSPM) as its group leader. During this period, he had several stints on research assignments in the US which included those at the Carnegie Mellon University, the Los Alamos National Laboratory and the General Electric Research Laboratory. He is a former chair of the research council of the National Institute of Interdisciplinary Science and Technology and the incumbent chair of the research council of Central Glass and Ceramics Research Institute of CSIR and the Gas Turbine Materials (GTMAP) program of the Aeronautics Research and Development Board of DRDO. He is a former president and the incumbent member of the council of the Indian Institute of Metals and sits in the governing board of the Indian Institute of Technology, Madras. The memberships of the board of governors of Mishra Dhatu Nigam and the strategic advisory committee of the Mining and Metallurgical Society of America were some of his other past assignments.

== Legacy ==
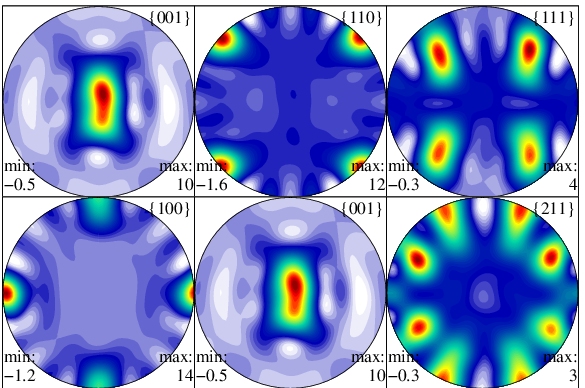
Pole figures displaying crystallographic texture of gamma-TiAl in a rolled sheet of alpha2-gamma alloy, as measured by high energy X-rays

Banerjee, whose research has been focusing on the structure and properties of titanium alloys, is known to have made significant contributions in the field of the physical metallurgy of titanium aluminides and his studies are reported to have assisted in developing alloy systems for high-temperature applications such as those in gas turbine engines. The group led by him employed advanced electron microscopy techniques to study the physical metallurgy of the alloys and was successful in discovering the Ti2AlNb phase which eventually helped other scientists in developing a new generation of alloys. During his days at DMRL, he contributed to initiating programs like the development of special naval steels for use in aircraft carriers and titanium alloys for aircraft engines. Later, at the research and development division of DRDO, he was instrumental in introducing programs in airborne electronic warfare, unmanned vehicle and airborne early warning systems. His studies have been documented in a number of articles; (Note: Please see Selected bibliography section) Google Scholar and ResearchGate, online repositories of scientific articles, have listed 141 and 109 of them respectively.

== Awards and honors ==
Banerjee received the Metallurgist of the Year Award of the Indian Institute of Metals and the Scientist of the Year award of the Defence Research and Development Organization in 1987. The Council of Scientific and Industrial Research awarded him the Shanti Swarup Bhatnagar Prize, one of the highest Indian science awards in 1993. He received the Superconductivity Prize of the Materials Research Society of India in 2001, followed by the Distinguished Alumnus Award of the Indian Institute of Technology, Madras in 2003. The Government of India awarded him the fourth highest civilian honor of the Padma Shri in 2005 and three years later, he received the Technology Leadership Award of the DRDO in 2008. The Indian National Academy of Engineering selected him for the Professor Jai Krishna Memorial Award in 2011 and he was chosen for the Lifetime Achievement Award of the DRDO in 2014.

Banerjee, who has held the J. C. Bose National Fellowship of the Science and Engineering Research Board, was elected by the Indian Academy of Sciences as their fellow in 1992. The Indian National Science Academy followed suit in 1995 with an elected fellowship and the third of the major Indian science academies, the National Academy of Sciences, India elected him as a fellow in 2001. In between, he also received the elected fellowship of the Indian National Academy of Engineering in 1999. (Note: Long link - please search for Dipnakr Banerjee to see details)

== Selected bibliography ==
- Kumar, A.; Jayakumar, T.; Raj, B.; Banerjee, D. (21 January 2008). "A new methodology for identification of β-transus temperature in α + β and β titanium alloys using ultrasonic velocity measurement". Philosophical Magazine. 88 (3): 327–338. Bibcode:2008PMag...88..327K. doi:10.1080/14786430701837015. ISSN 1478-6435. S2CID 135513991.
- Gogia, A. K.; Baligidad, R. G.; Banerjee, D. (1 June 2003). "Toughening and creep in multiphase intermetallics through microstructural control". Sādhanā. 28 (3–4): 677–693. doi:10.1007/bf02706453. ISSN 0256-2499. S2CID 53991984.
- Mohandas, T; Banerjee, D; Rao, V.V Kutumba (2000). "Microstructure and mechanical properties of friction welds of an α+β titanium alloy". Materials Science and Engineering: A. 289 (1–2): 70–82. doi:10.1016/s0921-5093(00)00914-x.

== See also ==
- Intermetallics
- Superalloy
