= Vikram Kirloskar =

Indian businessman

- Born: 19 November 1958; Bangalore, India
- Died: 29 November 2022 (aged 64); Bangalore, India
- Citizenship: Indian
- Education: The Lawrence School, Ooty; Massachusetts Institute of Technology
- Occupations: Businessman, industrialist
- Known for: Vice Chairman of Toyota Kirloskar Motor
- Spouse: Geetanjali Kirloskar
- Children: 1 (Manasi Tata)
- Awards: Suvarna Karnataka Award; JRD Tata Award (2020)

Vikram Kirloskar (19 November 1958 – 29 November 2022) was an Indian businessman and industrialist who served as the Vice Chairman of Toyota Kirloskar Motor. He was a fourth generation member of the Kirloskar business family and is credited with bringing Toyota's business to India in the late 1990s.

He died on 29 November 2022, at the age of 64, due to a heart attack.

== Early life and education ==
He was born in November 1958 in Bengaluru, India. He attended The Lawrence School in Ooty for his schooling. After school, Kirloskar went on to study at the Massachusetts Institute of Technology (MIT), where his grandfather had also studied. He graduated with a degree in Mechanical engineering from MIT. He was the son of Shreekant Kirloskar and the grandson of S.L. Kirloskar.

== Career ==
In the 1990s, Vikram was key in bringing Toyota's business to India. He initiated a partnership between Toyota and the Kirloskar Group, which led to the establishment of Toyota Kirloskar Motor in 1997. Over the next two decades, Toyota Kirloskar Motor launched successful models like the Qualis, Innova, Fortuner and Corolla in India.

He served as President of the Central Manufacturing Institute in Bengaluru and was a member of the Government of India's Development Council for Automobiles and the National Council for Electric Mobility.

He served as the President of the Society of Indian Automobile Manufacturers (SIAM) from 2013 to 2015. He also held the presidency of the Confederation of Indian Industry (CII) during 2019–2020. Vikram also served as the president of Automotive Research Association of India.

== Personal life ==
Vikram Kirloskar lived in Bengaluru with his wife Geetanjali Kirloskar. They have a daughter named Manasi Tata, who is married to Neville Tata, the son of Noel Tata.

Vikram was a wine connoisseur with a large collection of wines. He also loved cooking and described it as his favourite hobby.

== Awards and recognition ==
He was given the Suvarna Karnataka award by the Government of Karnataka. He was given the Indian Institute of Metals (IIM) JRD Tata Award in 2020, in recognition of his excellence in corporate leadership in the metallurgical industries, at the National Metallurgists' Day Awards by the Government of India, Ministry of Steel & Mines.

In 2021 he was elected a Fellow of the Indian National Academy of Engineering (INAE) and affiliated with its Engineering Section III (Mechanical Engineering). He was posthumously awarded the India Business Leader Award by CNBC-TV18 in 2023.

In March 2023, Vikram Kirloskar was posthumously conferred an honorary doctorate by Visvesvaraya Technological University.

In December 2023, the Confederation of Indian Industry (CII) established the CII Vikram Kirloskar Memorial Lecture Series in his memory. The inaugural lecture was held in Bengaluru on 12 December 2023 and delivered by Union Minister Nitin Gadkari. It focused on green mobility and alternative fuels.

In February 2025, the Government of Karnataka posthumously awarded Kirloskar the Industrial Legacy Award at the Invest Karnataka 2025 Global Investors Meet.
