= Prafulla Kumar Jena =

Indian metallurgist (1931–2023)

- Born: 27 December 1931; Odisha, British India
- Died: 7 March 2023 (aged 91); Bhubaneswar, Odisha, India
- Occupation: Metallurgist
- Awards: Padma Shri

Prafulla Kumar Jena (27 December 1931 – 7 March 2023) was an Indian metallurgist who served as director of the National Institute for Interdisciplinary Science and Technology (formerly Regional Research Laboratory) of the Council for Scientific and Industrial Research, Bhubaneshwar. He previously held the TATA Chair for the Distinguished Professor of Metallurgical Engineering at the Indian Institute of Technology, Kharagpur. He was awarded the Padma Shri, India's fourth highest civilian award, in 1977.

== Biography ==
Jena was born on 27 December 1931 in Taliha, Jajpur, Odisha. He completed his graduate degree in chemistry with honors and a master's degree in physical chemistry from Utkal University. He remained at the university for his doctoral research to secure a Ph.D. and shifted his studies to University of British Columbia at which he completed his M.S. in metallurgical engineering. He started his career as a senior scientist at the metallurgy division of the Bhabha Atomic Research Centre, Trombay, but later moved to Banares Hindu University as a professor of metallurgical engineering. Before holding the Tata Chair of the Distinguished Professor at the Indian Institute of Technology, Kharagpur, department of metallurgical engineering, Jena served as the director of the Regional Research Laboratory (RRL) of the Council for Scientific and Industrial Research (CSIR) (1972) and as the director general of CSIR (1986). He had also been a senior visiting professor at two overseas universities, Pontifical Catholic University of Rio de Janeiro, Brazil and Tohoku University, Sendai, Japan. A former president of the Natural Resources Development Foundation, Jena held the chair of the Institute of Advanced Technology and Environmental Studies, an organization engaged in technical consultancy and training in the fields of mining and mineral processing, management of waste and water resources, and material development.

== Research ==
Jena's research focused on the upgradation of ores and minerals, and the recovery of value resources from industrial wastes and is known to have developed methods for recovery of coal fines from slime, iron values from tailings and the beneficiation of low-grade iron and manganese ores. He is reported to have developed metallothermic reduction processes for Niobium, Tantalum, Vanadium, Tungsten, and Molybdenum. He had also contributed in the areas of chloride metallurgy of non-ferrous ores and extraction of nickel, cobalt, copper, lead, zinc, vanadium, and manganese. His research helped develop new waste management processes as well as value recovery processes from industrial and mining wastes. Over his career he published 240 research papers and held 55 patents.

Jena's contributions are noted in the establishment of Odisha’s Science Park. He had also been the founder president of the Natural Resources Development Foundation (NRDF), Bhubaneswar and was the founder chairman of the Institute of Advance Technology & Environmental Studies (IATES), Bhubaneswar. He was the founder editor-in-chief of the quarterly journal, Journal of Sustainable Planet of the IATES, started in 2010.

== Awards and honours ==
Jena was an elected fellow of the Indian Academy of Sciences and the Institution of Engineers, India and a fellow of the Indian Institute of Metals. He was a life member and former president of the Indian Science Congress Association, a former member of the Planning Board of Orissa and a former president of Orissa Bigyan Academy.

Jena received the National Metallurgist Award in 1969 from the Indian Institute of Metals and the civilian honour of Padma Shri from the Government of India in 1977. He is a recipient of the Federation of Indian Chamber of Commerce and Industries Award (1982), Institution of Engineers (India) Award (1998), Odisha Bigyan Academy Senior Scientist Award (1999), BHU Distinguished Services Award (2008), Times of India Think Odisha Leadership Award (2010), Rajiv Gandhi Professional Award (2012), and Indian Institute of Engineering Science and Technology, Shibpur Distinguished Scientist Award (2012). He has also received lifetime achievement awards from Ravenshaw Chemistry Alumni Association, Ravenshaw University (2008), and Institute of Minerals and Materials Technology.

== Death ==
Jena died on March 7, 2023, at his house in Bhubaneswar at age 91. The Odisha government announced that his funeral would be held with state honors.
