= Anupam Basu =

Indian academic and researcher

Prof. Anupam Basu
- Citizenship: Indian
- Education: Ph.D. in Computer Science and Engineering, Indian Institute of Technology (IIT) Kharagpur
- Occupations: Academic, Professor

Anupam Basu is an Indian academic and researcher specializing in computer science and engineering.

== Education and Early Career ==
After completing his schooling with St. Lawrence High School, Kolkata, Basu earned his Bachelor of Engineering in Electronics and Telecommunication Engineering in 1980 and his Master of Engineering in Computer Engineering in 1982, both from Jadavpur University. He completed his Ph.D. in Computer Science and Engineering from the Indian Institute of Technology (IIT) Kharagpur in 1988.

== Academic Positions ==
Basu worked as a professor in the Department of Computer Science and Engineering and later as the Chairman and Head of the Centre for Educational Technology at IIT Kharagpur. He served as the Director at the National Institute of Technology, Durgapur. Additionally, he has been an Honorary Professor at the School of Engineering, Shiv Nadar University since June 2021. He is also a Raja Ramanna Chair professor at Jadavpur University. He was a visiting professor at the University of California, Irvine, and the University of Guelph, Ontario, Canada. He has also acted as the Chairperson of the AICTE Curriculum Revision Committee for Computer Science & Engineering and has been a member of several committees of the Government of India and the State of West Bengal.

== Research ==
Basu's research interests include cognitive and intelligent systems, artificial intelligence, assistive technologies, embedded systems, and language processing. He has led projects focused on technology-enabled education, and initiatives assisting people with physical disabilities. He has been involved in the development of embedded system-based tools designed to empower the physically challenged and has led several national projects in this domain.

== Awards and honors ==
Basu has received several awards recognizing his contributions to technology and assistive devices:

- Young Scientist Award (1992) from the Department of Science & Technology, Government of India, for contributions to the R&D of technologies for the visually handicapped.
- Jaycee Award for Outstanding Persons (1996) from the Calcutta Chamber of Commerce, for research on assistive devices for the physically handicapped.
- Humboldt Fellowship (1997) from the Alexander von Humboldt Stiftung, Germany, for work in embedded systems.
- Fellow of the Indian National Academy of Engineering (FNAE)
- Fellow of the National Academy of Sciences, India (FNASc)
- Da Vinci Award (2004) from the Engineering Society of Detroit and Multiple Sclerosis Society of Michigan, for technology aiding communication by the speech impaired and people with cerebral palsy.
- National Award for Technology Development for Empowering Persons with Disability (2007) from the Ministry of Social Justice and Youth Empowerment, India
- Mphasis Universal Design Award (2011) from the National Council for Promotion of Employment of Disabled Persons, India, for contributions in design for the disabled.
- State Award for the Best Contribution to the Cause of Empowerment of the Disabled (2014).
