= Govindan Sundararajan =

Indian materials engineer

- Born: 11 December 1953 (age 72); Andhra Pradesh, India
- Occupation: Materials engineer
- Awards: Padma Shri; Shanti Swarup Bhatnagar Prize; Best Metallurgist Award; FICCI Materials Science Award; Indian Academy of Sciences Fellow; Indian National Science Academy Fellow; Indian National Academy of Engineering Fellow; National Academy of Sciences Fellow; Indian Institute of Metals Fellow; ASM International Fellow; J. C. Bose Fellow

Govindan Sundararajan is an Indian materials engineer, known for his contributions in the areas of Surface Engineering and Ballistics. The Government of India honoured him, in 2014, by awarding him the Padma Shri, the fourth highest civilian award, for his contributions to the fields of science and technology.

== Biography ==
Govindan Sundararajan was born in Andhra Pradesh on 11 December 1953. He graduated in metallurgical engineering from the Indian Institute of Technology, Madras in 1976, followed by master's degree (MS) in 1979 and doctoral degree of PhD from the Ohio State University, Columbus, USA in 1981. He returned to India the next year to start his career as a scientist with the Defence Metallurgical Research Laboratory (DMRL), in 1982. In 1997, he joined the International Advanced Research Centre for Powder Metallurgy and New Materials (ARCI) as its Director and currently holds the position.

== Legacy ==
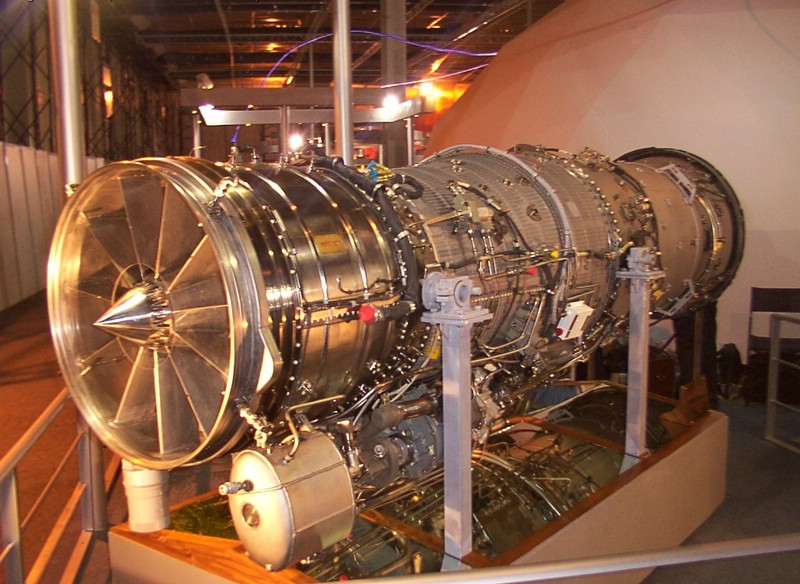
GTX-35VS Kaveri

Sundararajan is credited with extensive research on tribological behavior of materials and composites. An expert in specialty coatings, Sundararajan's research findings have assisted in developing advanced thermal spray coating for the Kaveri Engine Programme (GTRE GTX-35VS Kaveri). He has been instrumental in the establishment of many advanced research facilities such as the ARCI Center for Laser Processing of Materials, ARCI Surface Engineering Division, Center for Fuel Cell Technology, Chennai and the ARCI Centre for Sol-Gel Nanocomposite Coatings, all of which bear testimony to Sundararajan's design and fabrication abilities. It was under his leadership, the Advanced Materials Technology Incubator (AMT), an ARCI venture which at present, is home to five companies, was established. He is reported to have been successful in commercializing the technologies on behalf of ARCI, all the five companies under the Incubator programme being beneficiaries of technology transfer from ARCI.

Sundararajan is credited with many inventions for which he holds 5 patents.

- Lingamaneni Rama Krishna; Nitin Pandurang Wasekar; Govindan Sundararajan (14 October 2009). "Process for continuous coating deposition and an apparatus for carrying out the process" (Press release). International Advanced Research Centre for Powder Metallurgy and New Materials (ARCI).
- Lingamaneni Rama Krishna; Nitin Pandurang Wasekar; Govindan Sundararajan (17 August 2012). "Process for Continuous Coating Deposition and an Apparatus for Carrying Out the Process" (Press release). International Advanced Research Centre for Powder Metallurgy and New Materials (ARCI).
- Lingamaneni Rama Krishna; Nitin Pandurang Wasekar; Govindan Sundararajan (14 October 2009). "Process for Continuous Coating Deposition and an Apparatus for Carrying Out the Process" (Press release). International Advanced Research Centre for Powder Metallurgy and New Materials (ARCI).
- Lingamaneni Rama Krishna; Alexander Vasilyevich Rybalko; Govindan Sundararajan (2 August 2002). "Process for forming coatings on metallic bodies and an apparatus for carrying out the process" (Press release). International Advanced Research Centre for Powder Metallurgy and New Materials (ARCI).
- Lingamaneni Rama Krishna; Alexander Vasilyevich Rybalko; Govindan Sundararajan (2 August 2002). "Process for forming coatings on metallic bodies and an apparatus for carrying out the process" (Press release). International Advanced Research Centre for Powder Metallurgy and New Materials (ARCI).

Sundararajan has attended many seminars and conferences where he has delivered keynote addresses. He has also published several articles, over 170 in number, in national and international peer-reviewed journals.

- Ibram Ganesh; Susana M Olhero; Aurora B Araújo; Maria R Correia; Govindan Sundararajan; José M F Ferreira (2008). "Chemisorption of phosphoric acid and surface characterization of As passivated AlN powder against hydrolysis". Langmuir.
- Ibram Ganesh; Govindan Sundararajan (7 June 2010). "Hydrolysis-Induced Aqueous Gelcasting of β-SiAlON–SiO2 Ceramic Composites: The Effect of AlN Additive". Journal of the American Ceramic Society. 93 (10): 3180–3189. doi:10.1111/j.1551-2916.2010.03885.x.
- Ibram Ganesh; Polkampally P. Kumar; Ibram Annapoorna; Jordan M. Sumliner; Mantripragada Ramakrishna; Neha Y. Hebalkar; Gade Padmanabham; Govindan Sundararajan (2013). "Preparation and characterization of Cu-doped TiO2 materials for electrochemical, photoelectrochemical, and photocatalytic applications". Applied Surface Science. 293: 229–247. doi:10.1016/j.apsusc.2013.12.140.
- Sudharshan Phani Pardhasaradhi (2008). "Optical Diagnostics Study of Gas Particle Transport Phenomena in Cold Gas Dynamic Spraying and Comparison with Model Predictions". Journal of Thermal Spray Technology. 17 (4): 551–563. doi:10.1007/s11666-008-9206-0. S2CID 137592983.

== Awards and recognitions ==
Govindan Sundararajan is a winner of many awards and honours including the Government of India honour of Shanti Swarup Bhatnagar Prize in 1994. He has also received Best Metallurgist award in 1995 and the FICCI award for Materials Science in 2004. Institutions such as Indian Academy of Sciences in 1992, Indian National Science Academy in 1996, Indian National Academy of Engineering in 1999, National Academy of Sciences in 2002, Indian Institute of Metals in 2002, and ASM International in 2005, honoured Sundararajan with fellowships. He has also received J. C. Bose fellowship during 2006–2011. The Government of India honored Sundararajan again with the Padma Shri by including him in the 2014 Republic Day Honours.

== See also ==
- GTRE GTX-35VS Kaveri
- Defence Metallurgical Research Laboratory
