= Bal Raj Nijhawan =

Indian metallurgist (1915–2014)

- Born: 22 September 1915; Lyallpur, British India
- Died: 6 April 2014 (aged 98)
- Resting place: Manasota Funeral Home and Crematorium, Bradenton, Florida; 27°48′33″N 82°58′33″E
- Occupation: Metallurgist
- Spouse: Pushpa
- Children: 2 sons
- Parent(s): Lala Sukh Diyal; Rajwanti
- Awards: Padma Shri; Shanti Swarup Bhatnagar Prize; Iron and Steel Institute of Japan Gold Medal; Government of Yugoslavia Award; International Award Government of Poland; Government of Czechoslovakia Award of Honour and Gold Medal; Banaras Hindu University Distinguished Alumnus Award

Bal Raj Nijhawan (22 September 1915 – 6 April 2014) was an Indian metallurgist, author and the first Director of Indian origin of the National Metallurgical Laboratory, Council of Scientific and Industrial Research (CSIR). He was a recipient of Shanti Swarup Bhatnagar Prize, the highest Indian science award, which he received in 1964 in the Engineering sciences category. The Government of India honoured him in 1958, with the award of Padma Shri, the fourth highest Indian civilian award for his services to the nation.

== Biography ==
Bal Raj Nijhawan was born to Rajwanti and Lala Sukh Diyal Nijhawan, as one of their six children, four boys and two girls, on 22 September 1915 in Lyallpur, presently known as Faisalabad, in the erstwhile British India. His early years were spent in the present day Pakistan and did his graduate studies at Banares Hindu University in metallurgy to get a BSc degree in 1936. Later, he moved to London and secured a doctorate in Metallurgy from University of Sheffield in 1941.

Nijhawan moved to India with his family during the Partition of India in 1947 and joined the National Metallurgical Laboratory (NML), which was in its infancy at that time, in the fifties. Over the years, he became the Director of NML, the first Indian to reach the position. He worked there till 1966 when he moved to Vienna, Austria to join the United Nations Industrial Development Organization (UNIDO) as the Senior Inter-Regional Advisor (Metallurgical Industries). He worked with UNIDO for 28 years till his retirement in 1986.

After retirement from UNIDO, Bal Raj Nijhawan shifted his residence to Kokomo, Indiana and later, in 2013, he moved again to Florida. He was married to Pushpa and the couple had two sons, Pradeep and Pramodh. He died, aged 98, on 6 April 2014 at his home in Sun City Center, Florida and was cremated on 11 April 2014 at Manasota Funeral Home and Crematorium, Bradenton, Florida.

== Legacy ==
Nijhawan is one of the pioneers of engineering metallurgy in India and has done extensive research in the subject. He was one of the first Indian scientists to do advanced research on defence related technologies such as armour plate technology, armour failures and control of austenitic grain size of steels. He is credited with the development of nickel-free austenitic stainless steels from Cr, Mn, and N systems and indigenous raw materials. He led a research and development project on low-shaft ironmaking/steelmaking technologies which are in popular use the world over. He was also reported to have developed several substitute families of ferrous and non-ferrous alloys. His researches have been documented by way of a book, a monograph, several edited works and over 500 technical publications and he held over 55 patents for his researches.

Nijhawan was the first director of Indian origin at the National Metallurgical Laboratory. As the director, he contributed in setting up of several pilot plants and in the initiation of research programs. During his tenure at UNIDO, he assisted countries such as UK, US, Poland, Czechoslovakia and many developing countries in their metallurgical technology development. His contributions are noted in the establishment of 25 metallurgical engineering centres and mineral and metallurgical RampD replica watches centres in developing countries.

== Publications ==
- B. R. Nijhawan, A. B. Chatterjea (2007). Austenitic grain-size control of steel. Council of Scientific and Industrial Research. p. 58. ASIN B0007K2PTW.
- B. R. Nijhawan (1992). Production of iron, steel, and high quality product mix: latest technological innovations and processes. ASM International. p. 315. ISBN 9780871704573.
- B. R. Nijhawan, P. K. Gupte (1958). Symposium on Production, Properties and Applications of Alloy and Special Steels, Held on 1-4 February 1956. National Metallurgical Laboratory.
- B. R. Nijhawan. Development of Corrosion Resistant Alloys.
- P. H. Kutar, B. R. Nijhawan. Some Problems of Iron- and Steelmaking in the Hindustan Steel Plants.

== Awards and recognitions ==
Bal Raj Nijhawan, an elected fellow of the Indian National Science Academy since 1957, was awarded the civilian honour of Padma Shri in 1958. Six years later, in 1964, he received the Shanti Swarup Bhatnagar Prize, the highest Indian award in the science category, for his services to the engineering sector. He was accorded the honorary membership and gold medal of the Iron and Steel Institute of Japan in 1980, the same year as he received an award from the Government of Yugoslavia. The Government of Poland honoured him with an award in 1986 and the Government of Czechoslovakia followed suit with their award of honour in 1989.

Winner of the Distinguished Alumnus award from the Banares Hindu University in 1973, Nijhawan was an elected fellow of Institute of Metallurgists, London, ASM International (society), (former American Society of Metals) (1988) and the National Academy of Sciences, India. He was a member of the British Iron and Steel Institute (UK) and an honorary member of the Society Francoise de Metallurgies, Paris. He held the life membership of ASM International and the senior membership of Iron and Steel Society of USA during his lifetime.

== See also ==
- United Nations Industrial Development Organization
- National Metallurgical Laboratory
- Austenite
- Council of Scientific and Industrial Research
