= Tanjore Ramachandra Anantharaman =

Indian metallurgist and materials scientist (1927–2009)

- Born: 25 November 1927; Tanjore, Tamil Nadu, British India
- Died: 19 June 2009 (aged 81)
- Education: Madras University; Indian Institute of Science; Oxford University
- Awards: Shanti Swarup Bhatnagar Prize (1967)
- Scientific career
- Fields: Metallurgy, Material Science and Engineering,
- Workplaces: Indian Institute of Science; Banaras Hindu University; Thapar Institute of Engineering and Technology

Tanjore Ramachandra Anantharaman (25 November 1927 – 19 June 2009) was one of India's pre-eminent metallurgists and materials scientists.

== Early life and education ==
Anantharaman was born in Tamil Nadu, India, on 25 November 1927. He obtained his BSc (Hons.) in chemistry from Madras University in 1947, D.I.I.Sc. in Metallurgy from the Indian Institute of Science (Bangalore) in 1950 and an MSc degree in metallurgical chemistry from Madras University in 1951. After securing the first rank in all university examinations, he was awarded the only Indian Rhodes Scholarship of 1951 for his doctorate research in physical metallurgy at Oxford University (England). In 1954, he received a D.Phil. from Oxford and was in 1980 subsequently awarded the higher doctoral degree D.Sc. from the same university in recognition of his research output in many areas of metallurgy and materials science.

Starting with his two-month visit to Australia as Nuffield Scholar in extractive metallurgy in 1949, Anantharaman has traveled far and wide in the world during the last five decades. Apart from the three years (1951–1954) in England and two years (1954–1956) in Germany, he has been on many extended overseas visits on assignments ranging from a few weeks to several months, mostly as visiting scientist or visiting professor.

== Research and career ==
Anantharaman's professional career spanning over four decades included the following assignments: Research Associate, Max Planck Institute for Intelligent Systems, Stuttgart, Germany (1954–56), Assistant Professor of Metallurgy, Indian Institute of Science, Bangalore (1956–62), Professor of Metallurgy, Indian Institute of Technology (BHU) Varanasi (BHU), Varanasi (1962–87). He served BHU as Head, Department of Metallurgical Engineering, Dean, Faculty of Engineering and Technology; Director, Indian Institute of Technology (BHU) Varanasi, Member, Executive Council, Rector and Acting Vice-Chancellor. After retiring in 1987, he worked as Director, Thapar Institute of Engineering and Technology (Deemed University), Patiala (1989–92) and also as CSIR Emeritus Scientist (1987–89, 1993–95) and INSA Senior' Scientist (1995–2000), spending the 1993–2000 period at the National Physical Laboratory, New Delhi.

Anantharaman's research accomplishments encompass a broad spectrum of topics in physical metallurgy and material science. His most creative efforts have centered round pioneering contributions on rapidly solidified alloys and metallic glasses.

Anantharaman has over 250 scientific publications to his credit. He has edited along with his colleagues Proceedings of three International Conferences viz., Metal Sciences – the Emerging Frontiers (1978), Light Metals – Science & Technology (1985) & Advanced Techniques for Materials Characterization (1989). He edited a book Metallic Glasses in 1984 and co-authored Rapidly Solidified Metals: A Technological Overview in 1987, both books published by Trans Tech Publications, Switzerland. As part of his recent involvement in studies related to India's scientific and technological heritage, he wrote a monograph entitled The Rustless Wonder: A Study of the Iron Pillar at Delhi, published by Vigyan Prasar, Government of India, in 1996. This monograph has been translated into Hindi and Tamil, its CD-ROM has proved popular and it has stimulated further researches and publications on India's metallurgical heritage.

== Awards ==
- Kamani Gold Medal of the Indian Institute of Metals (UM) in 1960.
- National Metallurgists' Day Award of the Union Ministry of Steel and Mines in 1964.
- Shanti Swamp Bhatnagar Prize of the Council of Scientific and Industrial Research (CSIR) for Engineering Sciences in 1967.
- Federation of Indian Chambers of Commerce and Industry (FICCI) Award for individual Initiative in Science and Technology in 1972.
- Homi J. Bhabha Award for Applied Sciences by the University Grants Commission (DGC) and Hari Om Trust in 1974.
- VASVIK Award in Materials Science in 1978.
- Jawaharlal Nehru Fellowship of the Jawaharlal Nehru Memorial Fund (JNMF) during 1979–8 I.
- Election as President of the Indian Institute of Metals (IIM) in 1979.
- Bhatnagar Medal of the Indian National Science Academy (INS A) in 1982.
- Distinguished Alumnus Award of the Indian Institute of Science (IISc) In 1982.
- Tata Gold Medal of the Indian Institute of Metals (IIM) in 1983.
- Materials Science Prize of the Indian National Science Academy (INSA) in 1987.
- Henry Clifton Sorby Award, International Metallographic Society (IMS) in 1989.
- Eminent Teacher of Metallurgy Award on the occasion of the Golden Jubilee of the Department of Metallurgy, Bengal Engineering College, Howrah in 1990.
- Outstanding Teacher of an Engineering Institution – National A ward conferred by Indian Society of Technical Education (ISTE) and Uttar Pradesh Government in 1991.
- IIM Platinum Medal, the highest conferment of the Indian Institute of Metals, in 1996.
- Professor G.P. Chatterji Memorial Award of the Indian Science Congress Association (ISCA) in 1997.
- Distinguished Services Award of the Department of Metallurgical Engineering, BHU, Varanasi, on the occasion of its Platinum Jubilee in 1998.
- Dr. B.C. Roy National Award for "Eminence in Philosophy" in 2001.
- First-Ever "Lifetime Achievement Award in Metallurgy," instituted by Union Ministry of Steel and Mines in 2004.

In recognition of his numerous contributions to the Science of Metals as teacher and researcher, Anantharaman has been elected Fellow of the Indian Academy of Sciences (1964), the Indian National Science Academy (1972), the Institution of Metallurgists, London (1968), Indian National Academy of Engineering (1987 – its Foundation Year) and the American Society of Materials (1990). He is Honorary Member of the Indian Institute of Metals, Ehrenmitgleid Honorary Member) of the Deutsche Gesellschaft fuer Metallkunde (German Society for Metals) and Corresponding Member of the Royal Academy for Overseas Sciences. In 1989 he became the first Afro-Asian to be conferred the highly coveted Sorby Award of the 'International Metallographic Society' for his lifelong contributions to metallography.

To quote from a citation of his alma mater at Bangalore in 1982, "Through his distinguished contributions to metallurgical education and research, by nurturing the Centre for Advanced Study in Physical and Mechanical Metallurgy at Varanasi and by inspiring generations of students, Professor Anantharaman has had profound influence on the growth of metallurgy in independent India. The primary credit for the outstanding profile of present-day Indian metallurgical research rightly belongs to him".

== Other work ==
Another important dimension of Anantharaman's personality relates to Spirituality, Philosophy and Religion, particularly of the Vedic and Yogic traditions of India going back to over 4000 years. During the sixties and seventies, he participated in several programs of the Gandhian Sarvodaya Movement and drew inspiration from Mahatma Gandhi's spiritual heir Acharya Vinoba Bhave, the Initiator of Bhoodaan (Land Gifts) Movement. In 1974, he took steps to establish the Yoga Sadhana Kendra (Centre for Yoga) as an interdisciplinary academic unit of BHU and directed its activities for four years. This centre is still active and popular in the BHU Campus. He also took steps to launch the Indian Academy of Yoga as a Learned Society in 1981. He was founder-president of the academy during 1981–83 and has since been elected president for the 1984–86, 1987–89, 1997–99, 2002–04 and 2005–2007 triennia.

Apart from over 50 articles on Philosophy, Religion and Ethics, Anantharaman has authored two books in German, one on the Bhagavad-Gita (1961) published by Guenther Verlag, Stuttgart, and the other on Erkenntis durch Meditation (Knowledge through Meditation) published in 1977 by the Deutsch-Indische Gesellschaft, Stuttgart. His monograph entitled Ancient Yoga and Modern Science was brought out in 1997 by PHISPC, the National Project on History of Indian Science, Philosophy and Culture. His two condensed versions of the original Bhagavad-Gita of 700 slokas (verses) viz., Gita-Samgrah (The Gita Abridged) of 350 slokas and Gita-Sarah (Essence of the Gita) of 140 slokas (to facilitate reciting 20 slokas on every day of the week) have been in private circulation for some years now and have often been used for his discourses on the Gita in India and abroad. In recognition of his Sanskrit scholarship the Kashi Pandita Sabha (Scholars Guild of Varanasi) conferred on him in 1980 the title Vidya-Vachaspati, this conferment being equivalent to a Doctorate degree in Philosophy and Religion. In 2001, he was conferred the Dr. B. C. Roy National Award for "Eminence in Philosophy", the third person and the first scientist to receive it during the last four decades.

Anantharaman has also functioned as Kula Acharya (Chancellor) of Ashram, Atmadeep Research Institute for the Seculo-Spiritual Heritage of India (RISHI) & Headquarters of a Unique Movement for the Third Millennium to rejuvenate the Human Family through Secular Spirituality and Scientific Yoga. The Ashram is located just south of Delhi and has been given accreditation in 2004 as a Research Centre for Yoga and Allied Subjects by the Department of AYUSH, Ministry for Health and Family Welfare, Government of India.
