= Bikramjit Basu =

Indian professor

Bikramjit Basu is currently a full professor at Indian Institute of Science, Bangalore, specializing in Engineering Ceramics and Biomaterials Science. He was awarded the Shanti Swarup Bhatnagar Prize for science and technology, the highest science award in India, for the year 2013 in engineering science category. The prize was awarded for his "outstanding contributions encompassing theory and experiments to significantly expand our understanding of the in vitro cell functionality modulation on engineered bio-materials using electric field simulation approach". With a team of clinicians and entrepreneurs, he is actively involved in translating his research into implantable biomedical devices for orthopedic and dental restorative applications and currently leading a center of Excellence at IISc, Bangalore. In 2015, he received the National Bioscience award. Basu is also involved in development of Zirconum diboride based UHTCs.

== Education ==
Basu obtained his undergraduate and postgraduate degrees, both in Metallurgical Engineering from National Institute of Technology, Durgapur and Indian Institute of Science, Bangalore in 1995 and 1997, respectively. He secured PhD degree in Ceramics from Katholieke Universiteit Leuven, Belgium in 2001. After returning to India, he joined IIT Kanpur in 2001 as Assistant Professor and was promoted to full professor at IIT Kanpur in March, 2012. He joined Indian Institute of Science, Bangalore, in 2011.

== Research ==
Basu has authored/co-authored more than 200 peer-reviewed research papers with twenty three papers in Journal of American Ceramic Society. He has authored the first Indian textbook on Musculoskeletal Biomaterials (2016) published by Springer Nature Inc. and co-authored two textbooks, one on Structural Ceramics and the other on Tribology.

== Awards ==
Basu has received young scientists awards from the Indian Ceramic Society (2003), the Indian National Academy of Engineering (2004), and the Indian National Science Academy (2005). He was given the Metallurgist of the Year award (2010), instituted by Ministry of Steels, Government of India. He is the first Indian to receive (2008) the Coble Award for Young Scholars from the American Ceramic Society. He is an elected Fellow of Indian National Academy of Engineering; National Academy of Sciences, India; West Bengal Academy of Science and Technology; and Society for Biomaterials, India. In 2017, he is elected as a fellow of American Institute of Medical and Biological Engineering.
