= Lokesh Kumar Singhal =

Indian metallurgical engineer (born 1943)

- Born: 1943 (age 82–83); India
- Education: Banares Hindu University in Varanasi, University of Oxford
- Occupation: Metallurgical Engineer
- Awards: National Metallurgists' Day (NMD) Awards (1987), National Metallurgist – Industry award (2008), Padma Shri (2012)
- Website: Official web site

Lokesh Kumar Singhal is an Indian metallurgical engineer known for his expertise in steel making and for the innovations he brought into the steelmaking industry in India. He was honored by the Government of India in 2012 with the fourth highest Indian civilian award, the Padma Shri.

== Biography ==
Lokesh Kumar Singhal was born in February 1943 and received his degree in engineering from Banares Hindu University, Varanasi. In his postgraduate studies, he received a doctoral degree from the University of Oxford. He has served a few notable steelmaking enterprises in India, such as Alloy Steel Plant in Durgapur of the Steel Authority of India as the head of research and development, Tata Metals and Strips Limited, as the chief metallurgist of Navsari, and Salem Steel as the assistant general manager. He also worked in the Research and Development center of Steel Authority of India Limited as general manager, where he coordinated development of several special steels and high strength rails for which he received National Metallurgists' Day Award in 1987. He has also served as the chairman and managing director of Mecon Limited, wherein he contributed towards indigenous development of certain process technologies and the design development of plant equipment for the first time in the country. He received National Metallurgist-Industry award in 2008. He has worked for the boards of Hindustan Copper, NRDC, CMPDIL & Jindal Iron & Steel Company. During his tenure at Jindal Stainless Ltd., Singhal is known to have contributed to introduction of some process technologies for development of several high performance stainless steels which were earlier imported leading to saving of foreign currency and several novel stainless steels developed by him have been exported in large tonnages. He has published 60 scientific papers, presented 50 conference papers and co-authored two books.

== See also ==
- Steel Authority of India
- Jindal Steel and Power Limited
- Mecon Limited
