= Dipanwita Roy Chowdhury =

Indian computer scientist

Dipanwita Roy Chowdhury (born 1963, also published as Dipanwita RoyChowdhury) is an Indian computer scientist whose research interests include cellular automata, VLSI, and their applications in error correcting codes and cryptography. She is a professor of computer science and engineering at IIT Kharagpur.

Roy Chowdhury was a student at the University of Calcutta, where she received a bachelor's degree in 1987 and a master's degree in 1989. She completed a Ph.D. at IIT Kharagpur in 1994.

Roy Chowdhury became an associate member of the Indian Academy of Sciences in 1994. She is a member of the Indian National Academy of Engineering, elected in 2011, and a recipient of the Indian National Science Academy Medal for Young Scientists.
