= E. S. Dwarakadasa =

Indian academic

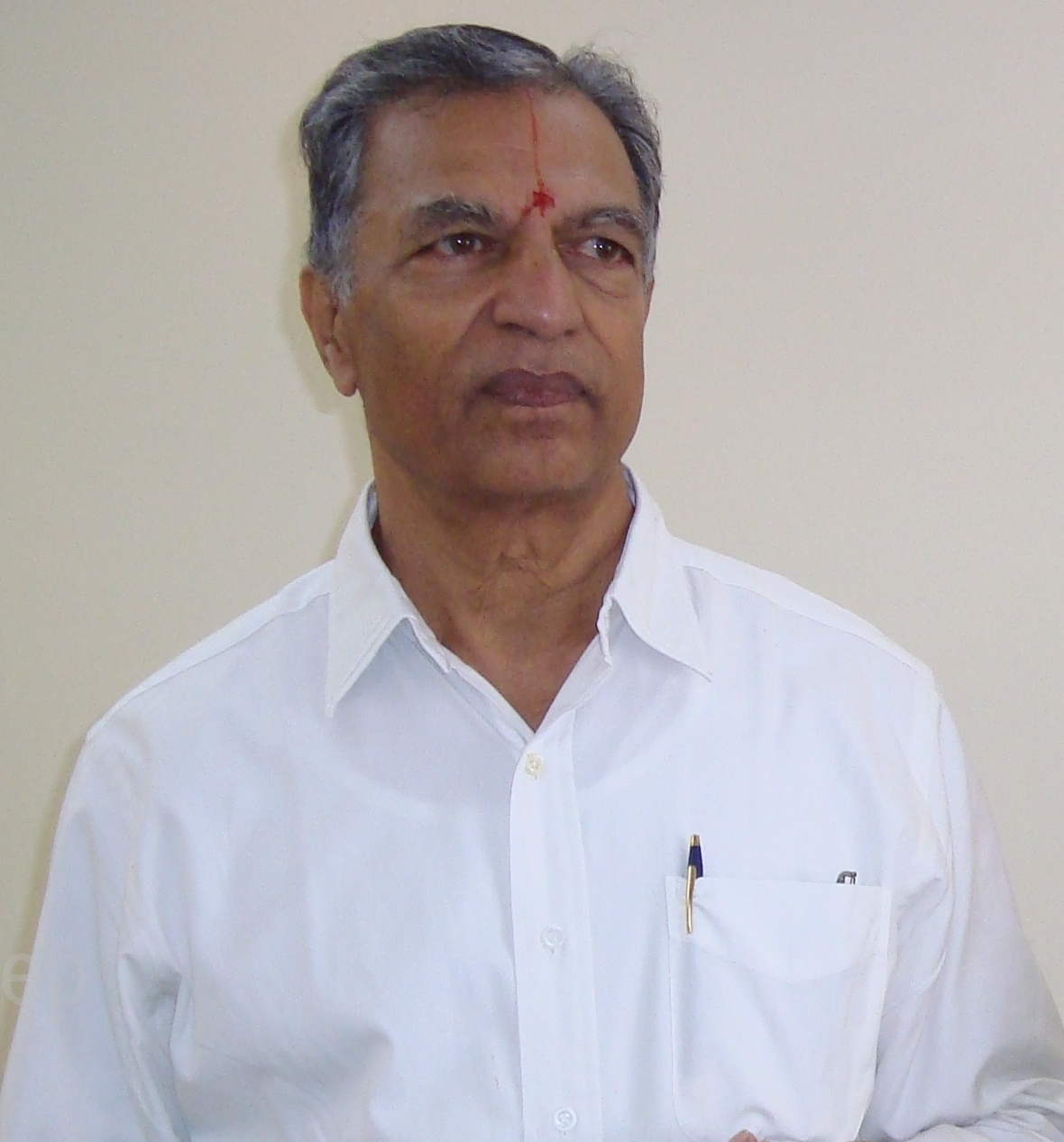
ESD

E.S. Dwarakadasa was formerly professor in the Department of Metallurgy at the Indian Institute of Science, Bangalore, and is currently the CEO & MD, Karnataka Hybrid Micro Devices Ltd. He was elected in 1998 to the Indian National Academy of Engineering.

== Selected awards and recognition ==
- 1990 Metallurgist of the year, IISc
- 1997 Zinc Gold Medal, Indian Institute of Metals
- 1998 Fellowship of the Indian National Academy of Engineering
- 1998 Member, Editorial Advisory Board, Anti-Corrosion Methods and Materials
- 1995-97 President of IISc Alumni Association
