= G. R. Bashforth =

English metallurgist and academic (1903–1982)

- Born: 18 January 1903; Rotherham, England
- Died: 1982 (aged 78–79); Devon, England
- Education: University of Sheffield
- Occupations: Metallurgist; academic; author
- Notable work: The Manufacture Of Iron And Steel
- Scientific career
- Fields: Metallurgy
- Workplaces: Banaras Hindu University; National Metallurgical Laboratory

George Reginald Bashforth (18 January 1903 – 1982) was an English metallurgist, academic, and author, primarily reputed for his work in India. He published numerous textbooks, including the various volumes of The Manufacture Of Iron And Steel. Additionally, he was a member of the National Metallurgical Laboratory, subsequent to his brief tenure as a professor in Banaras Hindu University, during which he invented a functioning prototype of the basic oxygen furnace.

In 1925, before the Sheffield University Metallurgical Society, Bashforth presented a paper concerned with "the reactions involved in the removal of impurities in the basic open-hearth process."
