= Jai Krishna =

Indian civil engineer

Jai Krishna (1912-1999) was a civil engineer from India with specialization in earthquake engineering. He served University of Roorkee for many years (1939-1971) and rose to become its Vice Chancellor.

== Early life ==
Jai Krishna was born on 27 January 1912 at Muzaffarnagar, in the United Provinces of Agra and Oudh. He got Bachelor in Science degree from Agra college and then studied engineering at Thomason College of Civil Engineering (now Indian Institute of Technology Roorkee ) passing with honours in 1935. As a student Jai Krishna won awards like Thomason Prize, Cautley Gold Medal and Calcott Reilly Memorial Gold Medal. He received his Doctoral Degree in Civil Engineering from University of London.

Jai Krishna joined Thomason College of Civil Engineering in 1939 as Lecturer and became Professor and the Vice Chancellor in 1969.

== Contribution ==
- Starting of a teaching and research program in Earthquake Engineering at University of Roorkee in 1945
- Introducing courses on Soil Mechanics in 1948 and on Structural Dynamics in 1945
- Formulation of Indian Standards for Earthquake Resistant Design of Structures that was brought out by the Indian Standards Institution (now Bureau of Indian Standards).
- Developed earthquake resistant design of a large number of major and important engineering projects in India.
- Initiated work on design, fabrication and installation of structural response recorders and accelerographs in India to collect data.
- Set up the School of Research and Training in Earthquake Engineering, at University of Roorkee.

== Awards ==
- Bhatnagar Award of CSIR 1966,
- National Design Award (1956) of the Institution of Engineers (India),
- Moudgil Award of Indian Standards Institution (1945),
- International Award of Japan Society of Disaster Prevention (1958) and
- Award for lifetime contributions in Earthquake Engineering by Indian National Academy of Engineering (1955)
- Padma Bhushan in 1972

Jai Krishna was awarded Honorary Degrees of Doctorate by Agra University and the University of Roorkee.

== Professional fellowships ==
He was a Fellow of many professional bodies and academies including:

- Indian National Science Academy,
- Indian National Academy of Engineering,
- Institution of Engineers (India),
- National Academy of Engineering,
- Third World Academy of Sciences and
- International Association of Earthquake Engineering — President during the period 1977-1980.
- Indian National Academy of Engineering- its founder President.

He died on 27 August 1999 in Roorkee.
