= Suvasish Mukhopadhyay =

Indian author and civil engineer (born 1963)

- Born: 8 September 1963 (age 63); Uttarpara, West Bengal, India
- Education: National Institute of Technology, Durgapur, Indian Institute of Engineering Science and Technology, Shibpur
- Notable work: The Rise of the Setting Sun, The Happiness Code, Indomitable Susan With HIV, 100 Decisions That Will Change Your Life
- Engineering career
- Discipline: Civil Engineering
- Institutions: MINCOLD, LMISTE, LMISTAM, LMISH, LMIWRS
- Employers: College of Engineering And Technology, College of Engineering, Pune
- Website: http://profsuvasish.com/

Suvasish Mukhopadhyay is an Indian author and civil engineer, who is currently Associate Professor at the Department of Civil Engineering, College of Engineering, Pune. Suvasish Mukhopadhyay has authored a technical book on fluid mechanics and 32 other non-fiction as well as fictional novels. The primary goal of his life is to inspire and enlighten the larger masses on achieving peace and happiness in life.

== Early years ==
Suvasish Mukhopadhyay was born on 8 September 1963 in Uttarpara, West Bengal, India, Mukhopadhyay was educated at the Uttarpara Amarendra Vidyapith (Secondary and Higher Secondary school). He graduated with a Bachelor of Engineering degree in 1986, from the National Institute of Technology, Durgapur, where he studied civil engineering. He then obtained a Master of Engineering degree in a Hydraulics in 1989, from Indian Institute of Engineering Science and Technology, Shibpur.

Mukhopadhyay's mother died when he was 12 years old. He grew up without fond memories of his childhood which taught him to look at various situations in his life in a positive way. Thus, all his books talk about peace, happiness and optimism.

== Career ==
=== Academic and engineering ===
Initially, Suvasish Mukhopadhyay moved to Jalgaon, Maharashtra and joined the Department of Civil Engineering in College of Engineering And Technology. In 1993, he joined the Department of Civil Engineering at the College of Engineering, Pune, as a member of faculty and has been teaching there ever since. Today he is an Associate Professor of Civil Engineering and teaches several subjects at the Undergraduate and Postgraduate level.

Mukhopadhyay has taught subjects such as management studies, fluid mechanics, dams and hydraulic structures, soil dynamics and numerical methods etc. He has also guided several students in their postgraduate level dissertation works. Over the years, Mukhopadhyay has handled several positions of responsibility at College of Engineering, Pune and other organisations. To name a few, Staff Advisor of T&P, Honorary Secretary of ISTE – Pune chapter, In charge of Civil Engineering Students’ Association, In charge of Transportation Lab, Member of F.E., S.E., M.E. Admission Committee, Ex–Executive council Member of Indian Society for Hydraulics, Member of Board of Studies of Civil Engineering, Elected Faculty member of Civil Engineering. In his 25 years of teaching experience, he has been in close contact with thousands of students.

Mukhopadhyay has reviewed many technical books about Fluid Mechanics and made significant contribution in the topic of Boundary Layer theory in most of books of McGraw-Hill Education and other publishers. He has done a considerable amount of consultancy related to the field of hydraulics, fluid mechanics and environmental engineering for several government and private agencies, such as PCMC (Pimpri-Chinchwad Municipal Corporation), DMC (Dhule Municipal Corporation), B.G. Shirke and Associates, PWD, Irrigation Dept, Finolex Cables, Normex Valves, NMC (Nagpur Municipal Corporation) among others.

=== Literary ===
Mukhopadhyay has always been a frequent reader and was encouraged by a colleague to start writing. In 2005, he published Tsunami: The Biggest Bane, which explains the occurrence and mechanism of a tsunami. He went on to write a series of academic books, namely You Can Score More, the national bestseller Motivating School Kids and How To Study And Succeed. He has also authored two books on the art of living and happiness called The Happiness Code and An Eternal Quest For Peace. He wrote My Students My Love, which talks of 108 students who were closely associated with him during his 25 years of teaching. Mukhopadhyay's most recent book is The Rise of the Setting Sun – Story of an Ordinary Indian. The book describes the struggles of a young student, Animesh, who is frustrated that his family is imposing the wrong vocation of Civil Engineering on him.
