= Aloke Paul =

Indian materials scientist (born 1973)

- Born: 4 October 1973 (age 52); Durgapur, West Bengal, India
- Education: NIT Durgapur; Indian Institute of Science; Eindhoven University of Technology; University of British Columbia; University of Vienna; Nanyang Technological University
- Known for: Studies on solid state diffusion
- Awards: 2010 MRI Outstanding Young Faculty Award; 2014 MoS Metallurgist of the Year Award; 2017 Shanti Swarup Bhatnagar Prize
- Scientific career
- Fields: Materials science
- Workplaces: Indian Institute of Science; University of Münster; Helsinki University of Technology
- Doctoral advisor: Frans J.J. van Loo; A. A. Kodentsov

Aloke Paul is an Indian materials scientist and a professor at the Department of Materials Engineering of the Indian Institute of Science. Known for his studies on solid-state diffusion, Paul is an Alexander von Humboldt Fellow. The Council of Scientific and Industrial Research, the apex agency of the Government of India for scientific research, awarded him the Shanti Swarup Bhatnagar Prize for Science and Technology, the highest Indian science award, for his contributions to engineering sciences in 2017. (Note: Long link – please select award year to see details)

== Biography ==
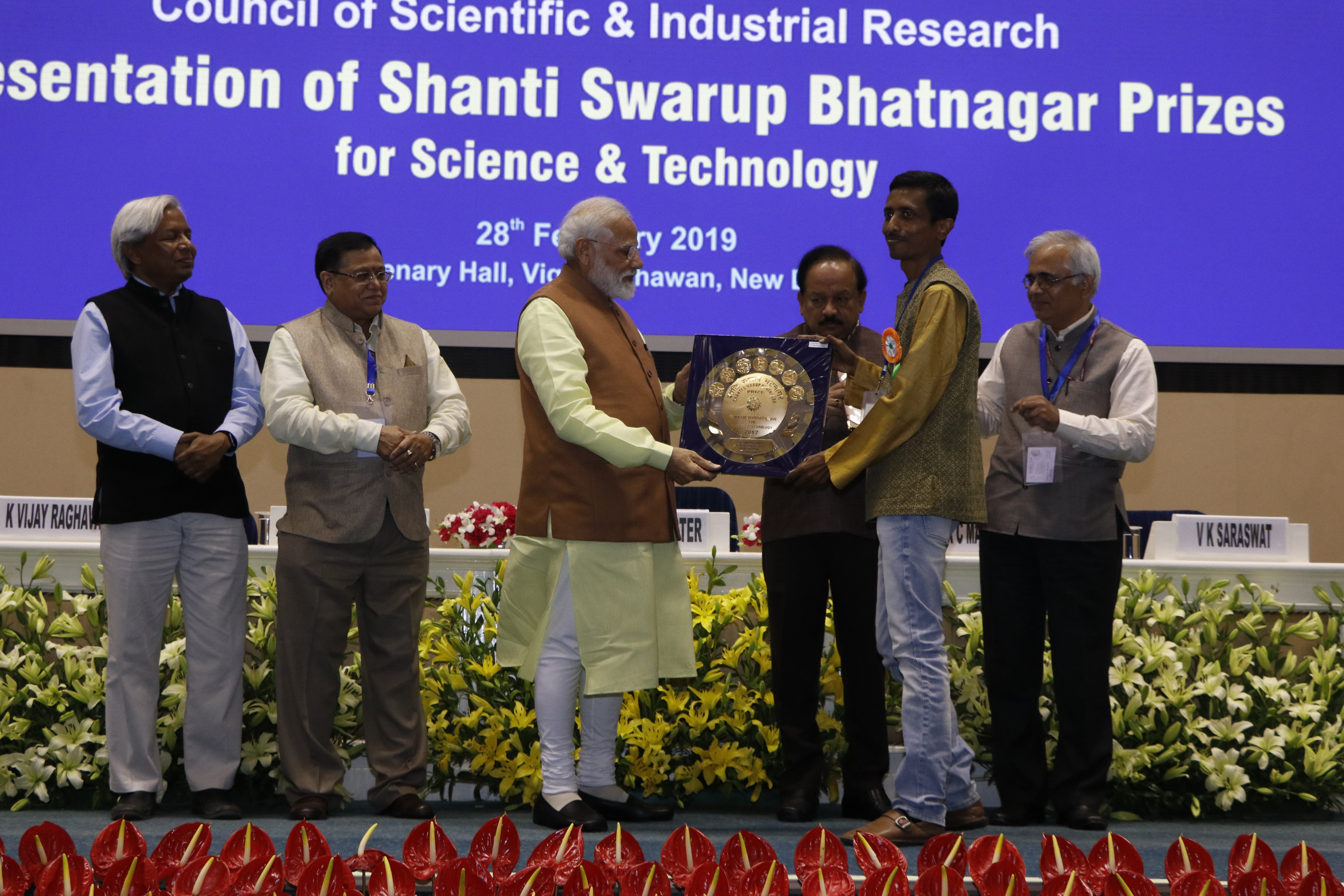
Indian Institute of Science

Aloke Paul did his schooling at B-zone Boys Multipurpose High School and Bidhan Chandra Institution, Durgapur. His undergraduate studies were at the Regional Engineering College (currently known as the National Institute of Technology), Durgapur, from which he earned the degree of BE in metallurgical engineering in 1996, and he subsequently completed his ME at the Indian Institute of Science, Bengaluru, in 1998. Subsequently, he had a stint at Nanyang Technological University, Singapore, as a research associate, which lasted until 1999. In 2001, he moved to Eindhoven University of Technology, in the Netherlands, for his doctoral studies under the guidance of Frans J.J. van Loo and A. A. Kodentsov earning a PhD in 2004. In between, he had a brief stay at the Institut für Anorganische Chemie of the University of Vienna, Austria, in February 2004. He did his postdoctoral work at the University of British Columbia, Vancouver, Canada, at their Advanced Materials and Process Engineering Laboratory (AMPEL) during 2004–05 and returned to India in 2005 to take up the position of an assistant professor at his alma mater, the Indian Institute of Science. He has been serving IISc ever since, becoming an associate professor in 2010 and a full-time professor in 2016, where he heads the Diffusion in Solids Group. He served Helsinki University of Technology (presently known as Aalto University), Finland, as a visiting professor in 2008 and the University of Münster, Germany, in 2012 as an Alexander von Humboldt Fellow.

== Legacy and honours ==
Aloke Paul is known to have made a notable contribution to the field of solid-state diffusion. While at Eindhoven University of Technology, he was part of a group of scientists who made a pathbreaking discovery of previously unknown phenomena related to the Kirkendall effect, leading to a deeper understanding through new models that are included in textbooks.

After joining the Department of Materials Engineering at the Indian Institute of Science, his group established a mathematical formalism for a physico-chemical approach that quantitatively relates diffusion rates of components to microstructural evolution, an important aspect for understanding many physical and mechanical properties of materials.

Prof. Paul's group is currently developing new quantitative models to estimate meaningful composition-dependent diffusion coefficients in multicomponent systems by tailoring experiments to address the complications of mathematical formalisms based on the Onsager formalism. This was considered impossible otherwise during the last several decades.

Paul has published four books, including a two-volume work, Handbook of Solid State Diffusion, Diffusion in Ni and Fe-Aluminides, Thermodynamics, Diffusion and the Kirkendall Effect in Solids. He is an editorial board member of the Journal of Electronic Materials, Diffusion Foundations, and Scientific Reports. He is a member of the international advisory panel of the Diffusion in Materials (DIMAT) series.

In 2010, Paul received the Outstanding Young Faculty Award of the Indian chapter of Microsoft Research and four years later, the Ministry of Steel of the Government of India selected him as the Metallurgist of the Year Award in 2014. The Council of Scientific and Industrial Research awarded him the Shanti Swarup Bhatnagar Prize in 2017, the highest Indian science award. In 2018, he became a laureate of the Asian Scientist 100. In 2020, he was elected a fellow of the Indian Academy of Sciences, and in 2023, he was elected a fellow of the Indian National Science Academy. In 2025, he received the prestigious Jagadish Chandra Bose Research grant from ANRF.

== Bibliography ==
=== Books ===
- Paul, Aloke; Divinski, Sergiy, eds. (2017). Handbook of Solid State Diffusion: Volume 1: Diffusion Fundamentals and Techniques. Elsevier Science. ISBN 9780128043608.
- Paul, Aloke; Divinski, Sergiy, eds. (2017). Handbook of Solid State Diffusion: Volume 2: Diffusion Analysis in Material Applications. Elsevier Science.
- Aloke Paul, ed. (2017). Diffusion in Ni and Fe-Aluminides. Trans Tech Publications Ltd.
- Aloke Paul; Tomi Laurila; Vesa Vuorinen, Sergiy V. Divinski (2014). Thermodynamics, Diffusion and the Kirkendall Effect in Solids. Springer. doi:10.1007/978-3-319-07461-0. ISBN 978-3-319-07460-3.

== See also ==
- List of Shanti Swarup Bhatnagar Prize recipients
