= National Institute of Technology, Durgapur =

Public technical university in Durgapur, West Bengal

- Motto: udyogaḥ puruśasya lakśanam
- Motto in English: Work Maketh A Man
- Type: Public technical university
- Established: c. 1960; 66 years ago
- Parent institution: Council of NITSER
- Accreditation: NBA
- Academic affiliations: AIU; INI
- Budget: ₹192.67 crore (US$20 million) (FY2024–25 est.)
- Chairperson: S. N. Subrahmanyan
- Director: Arvind Choubey
- Academic staff: 266 (2025)
- Students: 4,973 (2025)
- Undergraduates: 3,571 (2025)
- Postgraduates: 718 (2025)
- Doctoral students: 684 (2025)
- Location: Durgapur, West Bengal, India; 23°32′54″N 87°17′29″E
- Campus: Industrial city 190 acres (77 ha)
- Language: English
- Website: nitdgp.ac.in

National Institute of Technology Durgapur (also known as NIT Durgapur or NITDGP), formerly known as Regional Engineering College, Durgapur (also known as REC Durgapur or RECDGP), is a public technical university in the city of Durgapur in West Bengal, India. Founded in 1960, it is one of India's oldest technical universities. It is located on a campus of 187 acres (0.75 km²).

== History ==
The Regional Engineering College, Durgapur was first established under the direct control of The University of Burdwan in Burdwan.

Later, The National Institute of Technology, Durgapur (formerly Regional Engineering College, Durgapur) was established in 1960 under an Act of the Parliament of India as one of the eight such colleges, as a co-operative venture between the Government of India and the Government of West Bengal aimed to advance engineering education in the country and to foster national integration. Later in 1999, The University Institute of Technology (UIT) was established in replace of REC Durgapur to fill the void of engineering faculty of BU.

In 2003, the institution was granted Deemed University status with the approval of the University Grants Commission / All India Council for Technical Education; it was renamed the National Institute of Technology Durgapur and started granting degrees under its name. It became a fully-funded institution administered by an autonomous Board of Governors under the Ministry of Human Resource Development, Government of India.

National Institute of Technology Durgapur is one of the institutes in Eastern India to be selected as a Lead Institute under the Technical Education Quality Improvement Programme (TEQIP) of the Govt. Of India funded by the World Bank. In 2007, the Union Government of India declared it an "Institute of National Importance".

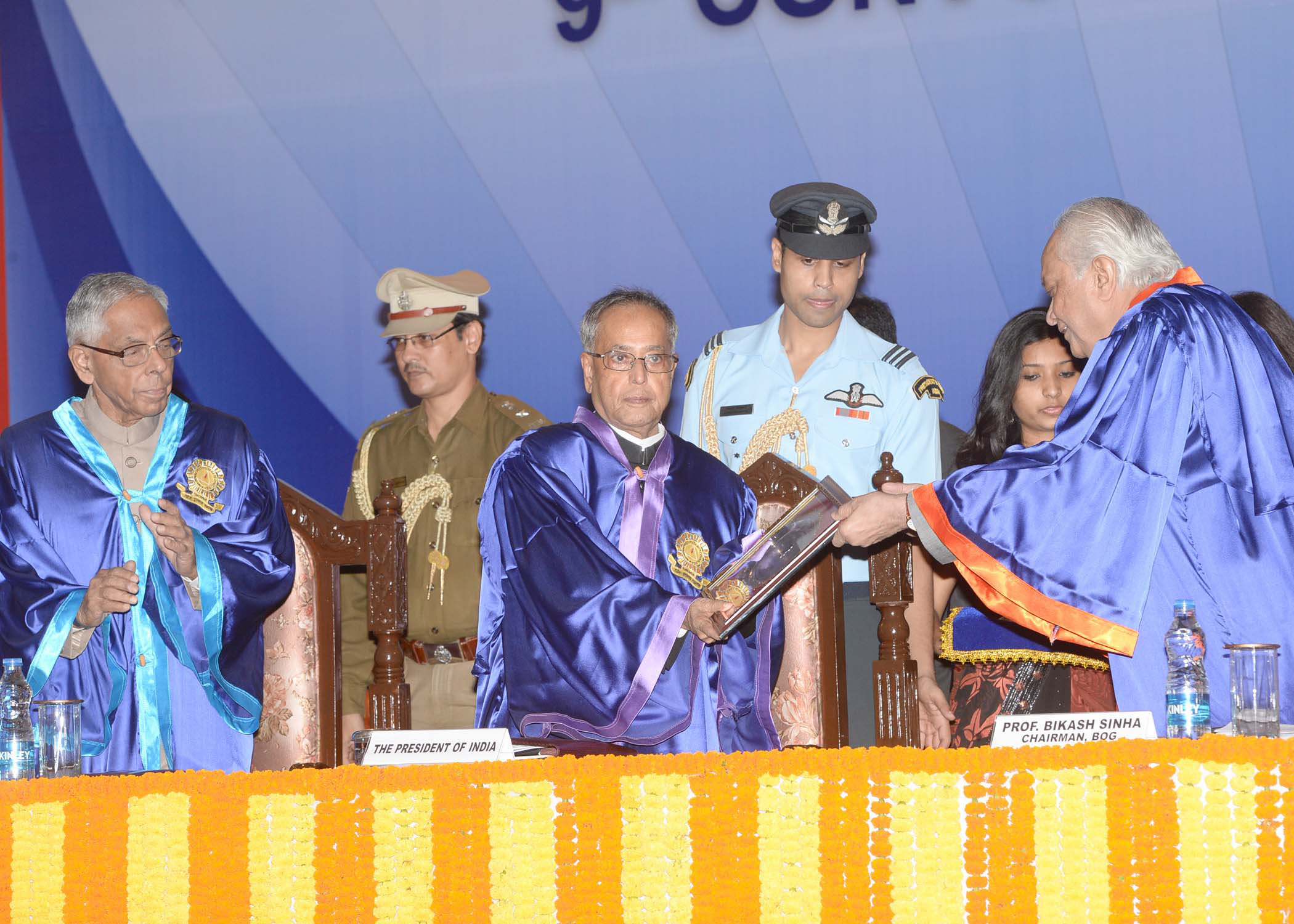
The President Pranab Mukherjee and Professor Bikash Sinha at 9th Convocation of NIT Durgapur on 22 Nov 2013

On 22 November 2013, during the institute's 9th convocation, Shri Pranab Mukherjee, President of India, addressed the Institution and appreciated its efforts towards research and innovation.

=== 2025 laboratory Blast ===
Professor Indrajit Basak, a senior faculty member and former officiating Director of the Institute, passed away on April 21, 2025, following a severe laboratory explosion. The blast occurred on April 15 during a thermit welding project supervision, when an unexpected chemical explosion inflicted critical burns on the 64-year-old educator. Despite receiving specialized intensive medical treatment at Safdarjung Hospital in New Delhi, he succumbed to his injuries. The academic community deeply mourned the loss of the veteran mechanical engineering expert.

== Campus ==
=== Overview ===
The campus spans 187 acres (0.75 km2). The main entrance is located on the eastern end of the campus, facing Mahatma Gandhi Road. The institute's academic facilities are located in the eastern half of the campus; these include the department buildings, laboratories and workshops, lecture halls, computer centres, and the central library. The campus has separate buildings for the departments of Computer Science Engineering, Electronics and Communication Engineering, management, Chemistry, Biotechnology. Each department has its own library, in addition to the central library, which holds more than one lakh resources including books, periodicals, and journals in print and electronic format.

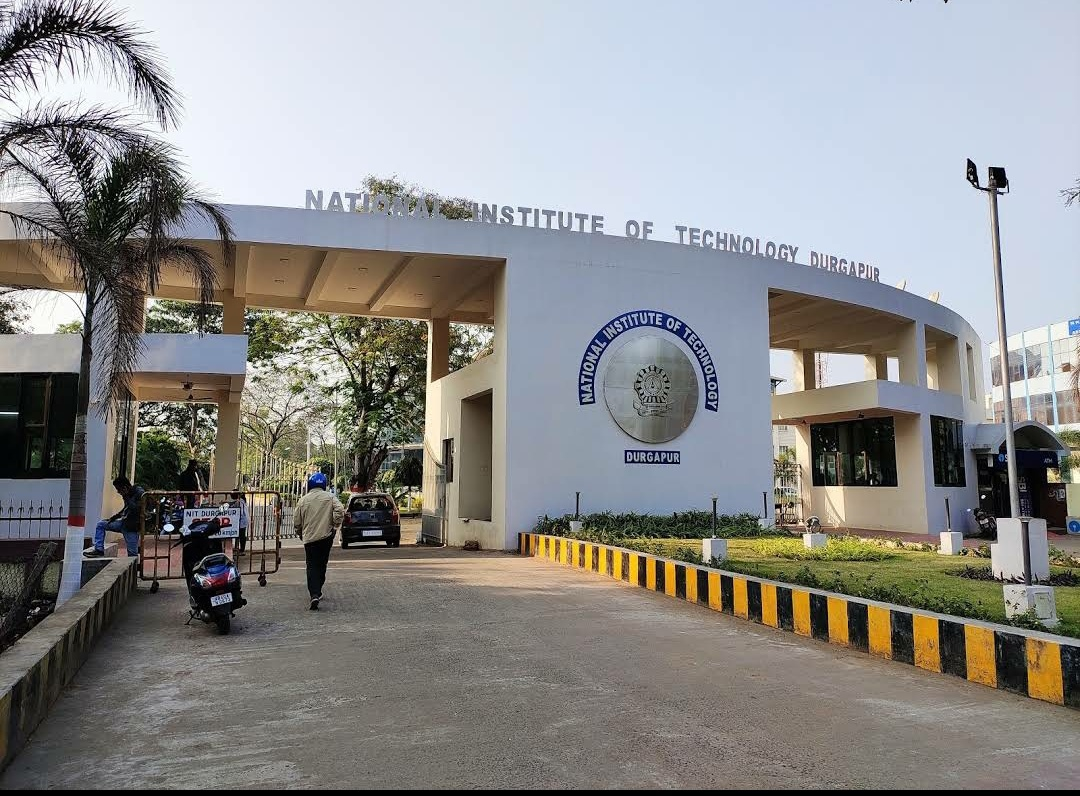
NIT DGP Campus Front Gate

=== Library ===
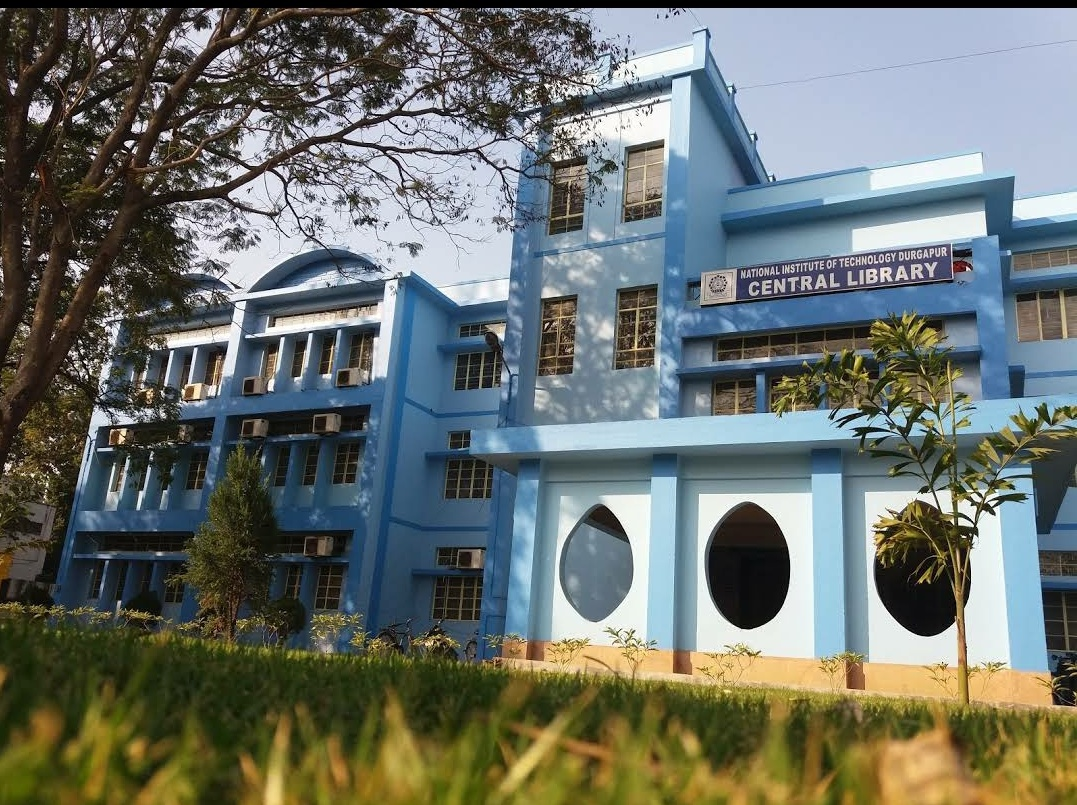
Central Library

NIT Durgapur has a modern central library with more than 1.7 lakh volumes of print resources consisting of technical books, reports, standards, compact disks, and back volumes of journals. The library also provides air-conditioned and Wi-Fi-enabled reading halls. It is situated opposite the High Voltage Laboratory. The library is an institutional member of DELNET (Developing Library Network), American Centre Library, Kolkata, National Programme on Technology Enhanced Learning (NPTEL), and Current Science Association, Bangalore. It is also a beneficiary Member of INDEST-AICTE (Indian National Digital Library in Engineering, Science & Technology) Consortium, which provides Desktop Access to high-quality e-resources (online journals) like IEL Online (IEEE/IEE Electronic Library), Springer Verlag's Link, Proquest, ACM journals, ASCE, ASME, Nature Magazine, Indian Standards (Intranet version) and ASTM journals & Standards, etc. It has a collection of several thousand E-Books on computer science (published by Springer).

== Organisation and administration ==
=== Departments ===
Departments of NIT Durgapur
- Biotechnology
- Civil engineering
- Chemical engineering
- Computer science and engineering
- Chemistry
- Electronics and communication engineering
- Electrical engineering
- Earth and Environmental studies
- Humanities and Social sciences
- Mathematics
- Mechanical engineering
- Metallurgical and Materials Engineering
- Management studies
- Physics

=== Centres ===
CENTRE OF EXCELLENCES
1	Centre of Excellence in Advanced Materials
2	Centre of Biomedical Engineering & Assistive Technology
3	Centre for Advanced Research on Energy
4	Centre for Research on Environment and Water
5	Centre of Excellence on IoT and Intelligent Systems

== Academics ==
NIT Durgapur offers undergraduate and postgraduate programs in disciplines spanning engineering, science, architecture and management. The institute has 14 departments with about 224 faculty members and more than 4,000 enrolled students.

=== Partnerships ===
NIT Durgapur and IIT Roorkee’s iHUB DivyaSampark signed an MoU in June 2025 to advance cyber-physical systems. The collaboration focuses on research, entrepreneurship, and commercializing patents to address societal technological needs.

=== Ranking and reputation ===
University rankings

General – India
- NIRF (Overall) (2024): 93

Engineering – India
- NIRF (2024): 44

NIT Durgapur was ranked 44th among engineering colleges in India by the National Institutional Ranking Framework (NIRF) in 2024.

== Student life ==
=== Cultural and non-academic activities ===
The annual Techno-management festival of National Institute of Technology Durgapur, Aarohan is usually held in the month of February every year. It comprises various events like competitions, exhibits, workshops and talks from guest speakers. Aarohan 2021 was conducted in virtual mode.

== Alumni ==
- Bikramjit Basu, Indian materials scientist
- Kamanio Chattopadhyay, Indian materials engineer
- Suvasish Mukhopadhyay, Indian author
- Aloke Paul, Indian materials scientist

== See also ==
- Indian Institutes of Technology
- National Institutes of Technology
- Ministry of Education (India)
