= National Metallurgical Laboratory =

Indian laboratory dedicated to research on minerals, metals and materials

Coordinates: 22.778°N 86.205°E

- Established: 1946
- Location: Jamshedpur, Jharkhand, India
- Operating agency: Council of Scientific and Industrial Research
- Website: https://www.nml.res.in/

National Metallurgical Laboratory is an Indian research center based in Jamshedpur that functions under the aegis of the Council of Scientific and Industrial Research. It was inaugurated on 26 November 1950 by Jawaharlal Nehru.

== History ==
In 1944, the then Government released ₹10 million (US$103,843) to set up National Physical Laboratory, National Chemical Laboratory and National Metallurgical Laboratory (NML). This was seen as a step by the Government to develop industry in pre-independent India, and also as an incentive to private firms to support industrial research. As a result, the Tata Trust promised to donate ₹1.17 million (US$12,000) to NML. A year later, Ardeshir Dalal – the then member of planning and development for the government – confirmed the location of NML to be Jamshedpur. In 1946, the governing body approved the final plans for NML. As per that, the laboratory was to be set up with an initial capital expenditure of ₹4.28 million (US$44,000).

On 21 November 1946, Honorable Mr. C. Rajagopalachari laid the foundation stone of the laboratory in front of representatives from the iron and steel industry. Dr. George Sachs, an American metallurgist was appointed as the first director of the laboratory. Since October 1949, the technological block of the laboratory started functioning effectively. On 26 November 1950, the country's first prime minister Pandit Jawaharlal Nehru inaugurated the laboratory. This was followed by a two-day conference that was held in the presence of the directors of National Physical Laboratory, National Chemical Laboratory, Central Road Research Laboratory, Fuel Research Institute, NML and Central Glass and Ceramic Research Laboratory. The conference noted the essential articles that were not produced in the country, but will be required during emergencies.

== R&D ==
- NML played a significant role in developing a ‘Direct Reduction Technology’ for producing sponge iron with solid fuel like non-metallurgical coal. This formed the basis of the first commercial sponge iron plant of India in 1975.
- NML had developed a technology for extraction of zinc by the hydrometallurgical route for Hindustan Zinc Ltd. In this process, nitrogen was used as an inert gas to prevent oxidation of zinc, and in a once through mode rather than recovery and recycling.
- Column flotation technology for the beneficiation of sillimanite was successfully developed and demonstrated first at the Indian Rare Earths plant in Orissa. Today it is commercially operating with consistent recovery and grades, both at Chatrapur and Chavara.
- NML had developed an eco-friendly cokeless cupola for foundries, particularly for the Taj Mahal area in Agra. This was based on CNG instead of conventional coke
- NML had developed models to capture and predict the process phenomenon occurring in different zones of the blast furnace. Lack of operational data was a great handicap. To overcome this, a Real Time Process Simulator was developed for online monitoring and prediction of internal process dynamics. At TISCO, the productivity of blast furnace G increased from 2.04t/m3/d to 2.46t/m3/d because of the inputs from NML. At Bhilai Steel Plant, the blast furnace productivity was enhanced from 1.6 t/m3/d to 1.88 t/m3/d upon implementation of the RTPS system.
- NML has developed a range of softwares, test protocols, sensors and devices for structural integrity assessment and residual life evaluation of materials and components used in power plants and petrochemical industries. NDE sensors and devices based on ultrasonics, magnetic and acoustics which have been implemented extensively in the industries.
- NML establishing a pilot plant to produce magnesium using indigenous technology in Jamshedpur. The plant will produce 120 kg of magnesium daily, NML has developed a new indigenous "Highly Guarded Magnetherm" process, this electrothermal process produces at pilot scale of 300-450 kg raw material producing ~40 kg Magnesium/batch.
- NML has developed Anti-tarnishing lacquer is a one-component fast-drying interior lacquer for use on Brass, Copper, Bronze, and Silver surfaces. It prevents tarnishing (blackening) and provides a durable finish resistant to water, acid, and alkali environments.

== See also ==
- Defence Metallurgical Research Laboratory
- Central Glass and Ceramic Research Institute
- Institute of Minerals and Materials Technology
- Central Electro Chemical Research Institute
