= Institute of Minerals and Materials Technology =

Indian research institute

- Former names: Regional Research Laboratory, Bhubaneswar
- Type: Public technical university
- Established: 1964; 62 years ago
- Parent institution: Council of Scientific and Industrial Research
- Chairman: Dr.Nallathamby Kalaiselvi
- Director: Dr. Ramanuj Narayan
- Location: IMMT, Sachivalaya Marg, RRL Campus, Acharya Vihar, 751013, Bhubaneshwar, Odisha, India
- Website: www.immt.res.in

Institute of Minerals and Materials Technology (IMMT) (formerly, Regional Research Laboratory, Bhubaneswar) is an advanced research institute in the field of mineralogy to materials engineering, established in Bhubaneswar, Odisha. It was established in 1964 by the Council of Scientific and Industrial Research (CSIR), New Delhi. The main focus area of research of IMMT is mining and mineral/bio-mineral processing, metal extraction and materials characterization, process engineering, industrial waste management, pollution monitoring and control, marine and forest products development, utilization of medicinal and aromatic plants, colloids and Materials Chemistry and environmental sustainability. Dr. Ramanuj Narayan is the Director of this Institute at present where 140 scientists are working towards nation building programme.
