= National Metallurgists' Day Awards =

Award given by India to encourage metallurgy in India

National Metallurgists' Day (NMD) Award is an Award Scheme that was instituted in 1962 by the Government of India Ministry of Steel & Mines, in order to encourage metallurgy in India. The Indian Institute of Metals (IIM), Kolkata has been assigned the task of calling for the applications for the awards, providing secretarial assistance for selection of the awardees and organising the function to present the awards.

The Awards are presented every year on 14 November for outstanding contributions in the metallurgical fields, including operation, research, design, education, waste management, energy conservation, et cetera.

The award money is provided from the annual budget of Ministry of Steel. A selection committee under the Chairmanship of Secretary (steel), composed of eminent members of the profession, selects the awardees.

At present annually 13 awards are presented which are as follows :

Sr. No	Description of Award	No. of Awards	Prize money (Rs.)
1	Lifetime Achievement Award	1	4,00,000/-
2	National Metallurgist Award (Industry)	1	3,00,000/-
3	National Metallurgist Award (Research & Academia)	1	3,00,000/-
4	Metallurgist of the Year (Ferrous)	2	1,25,000/- each
5	Metallurgist of the Year (Non Ferrous)	1	1,25,000/-
6	Metallurgist of the Year (Metal Science)	2	1,25,000/- each
7	Metallurgist of the Year (Environment)	1	1,25,000/-
8	Young Metallurgist of the year (Ferrous)	1	75,000/-
9	Young Metallurgist of the year (Non Ferrous)	1	75,000/-
10	Young Metallurgist of the year (Metal Science)	1	75,000/-
11	Certificate of Excellence	Example	50,000/-
	Total	13	20,25,000/-

While Indian Institute of Metals (IIM), Kolkata is the secretariat dealing with the routine work, Technical Wing of MOS, is the Nodal Point in the Ministry, in pursuing the following activities:

Co-ordination with the Sectt. i.e. Indian Instituteof Metals, Kolkata, arranging approval of budgetary fund from the Ministry for the Award money Constitution of the NMD Awards Selection Committee for assessment/selection of awardees in consultation with IIM. Selection of Awardees under different categories as per laid down procedure.

== 53rd National Metallurgists' Day ==
The 53rd National Metallurgists' Day (NMD) was celebrated for four days from 13 to 16 November 2015 at Coimbatore, Tamilnadu . The highlight of this year's NMD was a one-day International Symposium on "Vision 2025 - Global Challenges & Opportunities in Steel Industry" which was organized on 13 November as a part of the event. Under this initiative, eminent speakers from India and abroad delivered Plenary Lectures on specific themes.

As a tribute to the important role played by metallurgists in the country's economic development, the National Metallurgists' Day (NMD) Awards Scheme, instituted by the Ministry of Steel & Mines, Govt. of India in 1962, presently under the aegis of the Ministry of Steel, Govt. of India, serves to honor distinguished metallurgists and materials scientists of India for their invaluable contributions. The NMD Awards were presented on 14 November 2015. As a part of the proceedings, the NMD awardees presented the highlights of their work and showcased their technical achievements before the metallurgical community.

The NMD proceedings on 14 November 2015 also featured enlightening talks from the doyens of metallurgical education and research in the form of Prof. N. P.Gandhi Memorial, Dr. Daya Swarup Memorial and G D Birla Medal (Ghanshyam Das Birla) lectures. The IIM recognizes and rewards outstanding contributions from Metallurgists, Material Scientists, Professionals, Researchers, Teachers and Students engaged in diverse areas of specialization.
