= Indian Institute of Metals =

Indian professional body

IIM Logo

Indian Institute of Metals (IIM) was formed in Kolkata in 1946 under the leadership of a few metallurgists of Indian Aluminum Company.

The IIM is a professional institute set up to promote and advance the study and practice of the science and the art of making and treating of metals and alloys and to promote the practice in metallurgical profession. The space for its office at Calcutta was provided by Tata Steel. The Institute was inaugurated on 29 December 1947 at the Royal Asiatic Society Hall, Calcutta

The institute has chapters in almost all important towns and cities of India including in Keonjhar, Odisha.

This institute is popular for providing distance courses for those who want to pursue BTech in metallurgy by distance mode. Normally exams are taken in twice per year (end of June and December).

In July 2025, IIT Hyderabad director BS Murty was appointed as its president.
