= Indian National Academy of Engineering =

Indian Scientific Organization

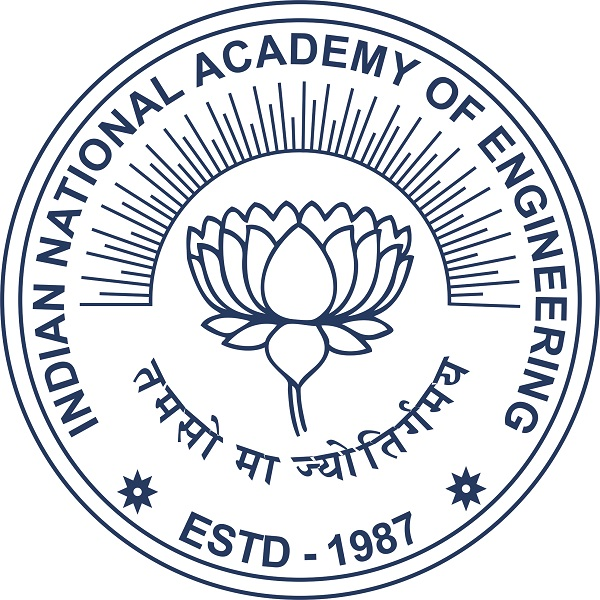
- Motto: Tamoso Maa Jyotirgamaya
- Established: 21 April 1987
- President: Mr. JD Patil
- Head: Lt Col Shobhit Rai (Retd)
- Address: Ground Floor, Block-II, Technology Bhavan, New Mehrauli Road, New Delhi-110016
- Location: New Delhi, India
- Website: https://www.inae.in/

The Indian National Academy of Engineering (INAE) was founded in 1987. It consists of India's engineers, engineer-scientists and technologists covering the entire spectrum of engineering disciplines. The academy is registered under the Societies Registration Act 1860 and is an autonomous institution supported partly through grant-in-aid by Department of Science & Technology, Government of India. As the only engineering Academy of the country, INAE represents India at the International Council of Academies of Engineering and Technological Sciences (CAETS).

INAE functions as an apex body and promotes the practice of engineering and technology and the related sciences for their application to solving problems of national importance. The academy also provides a forum for futuristic planning for the country's development, requiring engineering and technological inputs and brings together specialists from such fields as may be necessary for comprehensive solutions to the needs of the country.

== History ==
The Indian National Academy of Engineering was registered on 20 April 1987 on the recommendation of the Ministry of Civil Supplies. Jai Krishna was appointed its first President.

The academy was formally inaugurated by the Prime Minister Rajiv Gandhi on 11 April 1988 at a Foundation Function in New Delhi.

== See also ==
- Indian National Science Academy
- Department of Science and Technology (India)
