= H. K. Firodia Awards =

Indian science and technology awards

- Award for individual contributions to science and technology
- Sponsored by: H. K. Firodia Foundation
- Rewards: ₹2 lakhs and ₹1 lakh
- First award: 1996
- Website: hkfirodiaawards.org

H. K. Firodia Awards for excellence in science and technology are given annually by the H. K. Firodia Foundation. The awards were initiated in 1996 to recognize achievements by Indian scientists in any field of science. The awards are given at a ceremony in Pune.

There are two awards every year:

- Award I: The main award is presented to an individual in recognition of their lifetime achievements and contributions to the fields of science and technology.
- Award II: The second award is given to young and promising innovators, scientist and technologists.

== List of awardees ==
Source: H K Firodia Foundation

Year	Name	Subject
1996	A. P. J. Abdul Kalam	Engineering & Space
1996	Vijay P. Bhatkar	Computer Science
1997	C. N. R. Rao	Chemistry
1997	Anil Kakodkar	Nuclear
1998	Rajagopala Chidambaram	Nuclear
1998	S. K. Sikka	Nuclear
1999	Krishnaswamy Kasturirangan	Engineering & Space
1999	Paul Ratnasamy	Chemistry
1999	Man Mohan Sharma	Chemistry
2000	Raghunath Anant Mashelkar	Engineering & Space
2000	D. D. Bhawalkar	Nuclear
2001	Govind Swarup	Astronomy & Astrophysics
2001	Ramanujam Varatharaja Perumal	Engineering & Space
2002	M. S. Valiathan	Life Sciences, Medicine & Genomics
2002	Ashok Jhunjhunwala	Computer Science
2003	Prakash Narain Tandon	Life Sciences, Medicine & Genomics
2003	Padmanabhan Balaram	Chemistry
2004	Obaid Siddiqi	Life Sciences, Medicine & Genomics
2004	T. S. Prahlad	Engineering & Space
2005	M. S. Swaminathan	Agriculture
2005	G. Madhavan Nair	Engineering & Space
2005	Ashoke Sen	Mathematics
2006	Jayant Narlikar	Astronomy & Astrophysics
2006	Shivram Bhoje	Nuclear
2007	Madhav Gadgil	Ecology
2007	Samir K. Brahmachari	Life Sciences, Medicine & Genomics
2008	Raghavendra Gadagkar	Ecology
2008	C. S. Seshadri	Mathematics
2009	Yash Pal	Physics
2009	Mylswamy Annadurai	Engineering & Space
2010	Goverdhan Mehta	Chemistry
2010	Ajay K. Sood	Physics
2011	Roddam Narasimha	Engineering & Space
2011	Manindra Agrawal	Mathematics
2012	T. V. Ramakrishnan	Physics
2012	K. Vijayraghavan	Life Sciences, Medicine & Genomics
2013	Dipankar Das Sarma	Nano Technology
2013	M. S. Narasimhan	Mathematics
2014	Maharaj Kishan Bhan	Life Sciences, Medicine & Genomics
2014	Devang Khakar	Chemistry
2015	Baldev Raj	Nuclear
2015	Krishna N. Ganesh	Chemistry
2016	Sriram Ramaswamy	Physics
2016	Sanjeev Dhurandhar	Astrophysics
2017	A. S. Kiran Kumar	Aeronautics
2017	Ashutosh Sharma	Nanotechnology
2018	Sandip Trivedi	Theoretical physics
2018	Satyajit Mayor	Biology
2019	K. Sivan	Aerospace engineering
2019	Shekhar Mande	Structural and Computational Biology

== See also ==
- List of general science and technology awards
