= S. K. Sikka =

Indian nuclear physicist (1941–2023)

- Born: 22 November 1941; Jhang Maghiana, Punjab, British India
- Died: 21 June 2023 (aged 82)
- Occupations: Nuclear Condensed Matter physicist Crystallographer
- Known for: Indian Nuclear Weapons Programme
- Awards: Padma Shri; H. K. Firodia award MRSI-ISCS Superconductivity and Materials Science Annual Prize; M. M. Chugani Award of Indian Physics Association for applied physics Homi Jehangir Bhabha Medal of INSA; Homi Bhabha Lifetime Achievement Award of Indian Nuclear Society; Meghnad Saha Medal of National Academy Sciences; DAE Lifetime Achievement Awards

Satinder Kumar Sikka (22 November 1941 – 21 June 2023) was an Indian nuclear condensed matter physicist, crystallographer and a former Scientific Secretary to the Principal Scientific Advisor to the Government of India. He was known to have played a crucial role, along with Raja Ramanna, Rajagopala Chidambaram and Basanti Dulal Nagchaudhuri, in the design and development of a hydrogen bomb by India, which was tested at the Pokhran Test Range in May 1998, under the code name, Operation Shakthi. He was also involved in the Smiling Buddha tests, conducted in 1974. He was awarded the fourth highest civilian award of the Padma Shri, by the Government of India, in 1999.

== Biography ==
Satinder Kumar Sikka was born in Jhang Maghiana (now in Pakistan) in undivided India on 22 November 1942, three months after the Quit India Movement was launched. He graduated (BSc) from the Punjab University in 1960 after which he started his career by joining the Bhabha Atomic Research Centre Training School. While at BARC, he did research under Rajagopala Chidambaram, the renowned nuclear physicist who would later become his associate in the Pokhran tests, and secured a doctoral degree (PhD) from Mumbai University in 1970. His research during this period were centered around the topics of neutron diffraction, X-ray crystallography, and high pressure and shock wave physics. He served BARC till 2002, holding several key positions such as that of the Director of Atomic and Condensed Matter Physics Group. In 2002, he was appointed as the Scientific Secretary to Principal Scientific Adviser to the Union Government and he continued his association with the office, even after his superannuation, first as a Scientific consultant to the Principal Scientific Adviser and then, as a member of the Scientific Advisory Committee to the Cabinet (SAC-C). He was the Homi Bhabha Chair Professor at the Bhabha Atomic Research Centre from 2010 to 2013. He died on 21 June 2023.

== Legacy ==
Sikka's early research on neutron diffraction and his studies of the Phase problem employing anomalous and direct scattering methods have been accepted by the International Union of Crystallography and has been incorporated in their teaching aids. In 1969, he was included in the team of scientists for the Indian Nuclear Weapons Programme and was a member of the Smiling Buddha team which successfully tested the first Indian nuclear bomb on 18 May 1974. He continued his involvement with the team and was the head of the thermonuclear device development team of the Pokhran-II test of 1998. It is reported that Rajagopala Chidambaram, his mentor at BARC, entrusted the responsibility of the development of the thermonuclear test device to Sikka, after consultation with the then Prime Minister of India, P. V. Narasimha Rao. Sikka, receiving the instructions, set up a laboratory with facilities for static pressure generation employing diamond anvil cells and shock waves generation with gas guns, the first such laboratory in India. The research here assisted in the development of computer codes for design, simulation and yield estimates of nuclear explosives and, aided by these work, he is known to have developed a freshly designed device using a boosted fission bomb primary, to be used on a ballistic missile. His research has been documented by way of over 150 articles, published in national and international peer reviewed journals.

Sikka served as a member of the Executive Committee of the International Association for Advancement of Research and Technology under High Pressure from 1997 to 2000 and as a consultant to the Commission on High Pressure of International Union of Crystallography from 2002 to 2006. He has chaired the INSA committees for the International Union of Crystallography and Committee on Data for Science and Technology and has served as a member of the Asia Pacific Academy of Materials and the editorial board of High Pressure Research journal.

== Awards and honours ==
Sikka holds the honorific title of the Distinguished Scientist of the Bhabha Atomic Research Centre. The Indian National Science Academy elected him as their Fellow in 1988. Two years later, the Indian Academy of Sciences followed suit and elected him as a Fellow. In 1998, he was awarded the H. K. Firodia award for Excellence in Science and Technology, one year before he received the fourth highest Indian civilian award of the Padma Shri. He was selected for the MRSI-ISCS Superconductivity and Materials Science Annual Prize in 2001 and the Indian Physics Association awarded him the M. M. Chugani Award for Excellence in Applied Physics in 2002, before the National Academy of Sciences, India elected him as their Fellow in 2003. Indian National Science Academy honoured him with Homi Jehangir Bhabha Medal for Experimental Physics in 2005. Indian Nuclear Society gave him the Homi Bhabha Lifetime Achievement Award of in 2007. The National Academy of Sciences, Allahabad gave him Meghnadh Saha Medal in 2010. The Department of Atomic Energy awarded him the Lifetime Achievement Award in 2011.

== See also ==
- Smiling Buddha
- Pokhran-II
- Raja Ramanna
- Rajagopala Chidambaram
- Basanti Dulal Nagchaudhuri
