= Ashutosh Sharma (chemical engineer) =

Indian chemical engineer and scientist (born 1961)

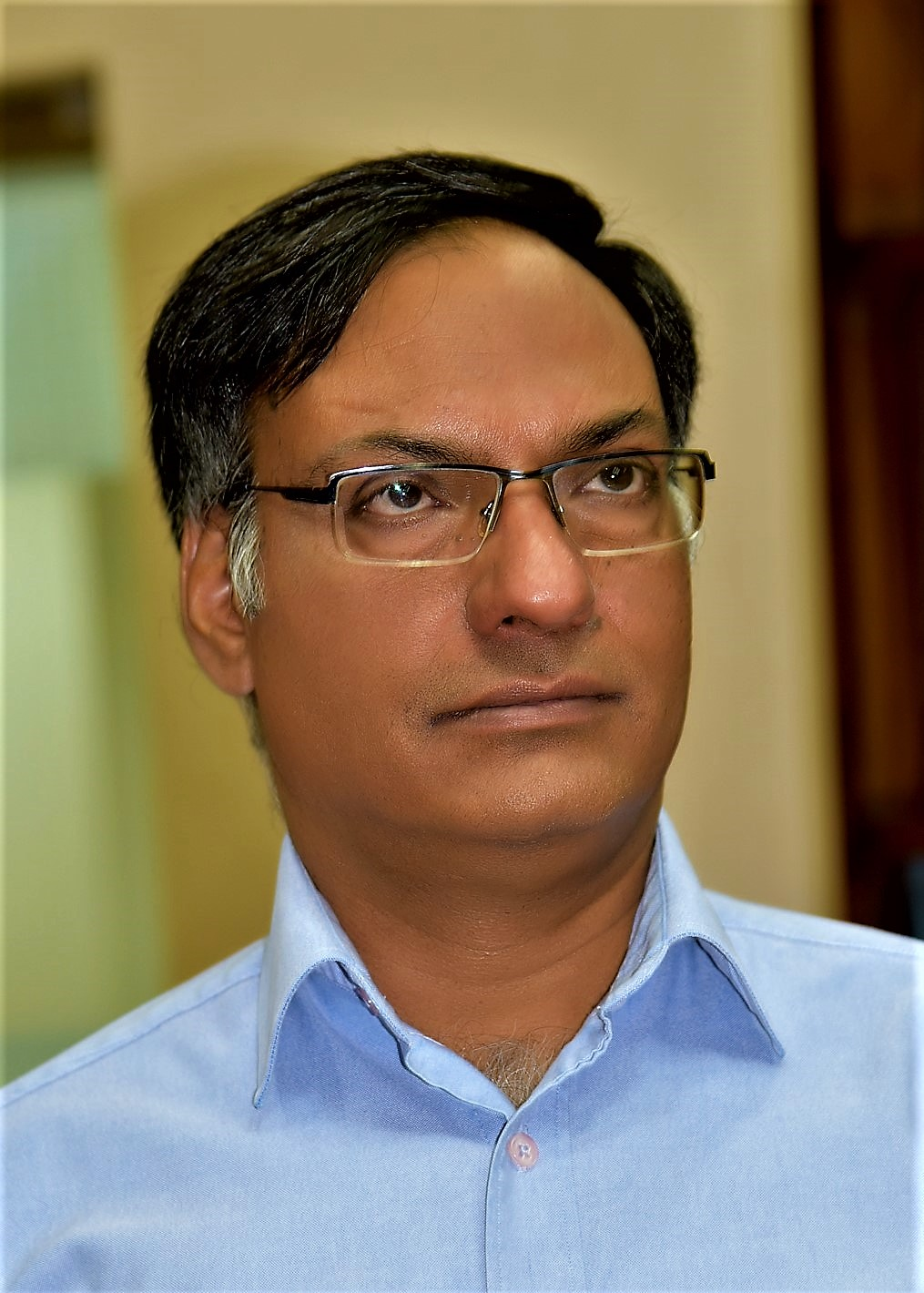
- Born: 22 August 1961 (age 65); Ajmer, Rajasthan, India
- Education: Indian Institute of Technology Kanpur; Pennsylvania State University; University at Buffalo
- Awards: * 2025 Padma Shri; * 2017 H. K. Firodia Award; * 2010 Infosys Prize; * 2008 TWAS Prize; * Bessel Research Award; * S. S. Bhatnagar Prize; * J. Bhabha Award of UGC; * The Syed Husain Zaheer Medal; * The Meghnad Saha Medal of INSA; * The Life-time Achievement Award of the Indian Science Congress
- Scientific career
- Fields: Chemical engineering, nanotechnology
- Workplaces: IIT Kanpur
- Doctoral advisor: Eli Ruckenstein

Ashutosh Sharma (born 22 August 1961) is an Institute Chair Professor and C V Seshadri Chair Professor at the Department of chemical engineering of Indian Institute of Technology Kanpur. He is the founding Coordinator of DST Thematic Unit of Excellence on Soft Nanofabrication and Chairman of Centre for Environmental Science and Engineering at IIT Kanpur. He is best known for his pioneering research work in the areas of colloids, thin film, interfaces, adhesion, patterning and in the fabrication and application of self-assembled nano-structures.

== Early life ==
Ashutosh Sharma got his B.Tech degree in chemical engineering from Indian Institute of Technology Kanpur (IIT Kanpur), India, in 1982. Sharma graduated with a master's degree from Pennsylvania State University in 1984 and three years later obtained his Ph.D. in chemical engineering from the University at Buffalo, where he worked with Prof Eli Ruckenstein.

== Career ==
He was a member of the editorial board of Chemical Engineering Science from 2007 to 2010. Prior to it, he served on the editorial board of the Journal of Colloid and Interface Science (2000–2002) and Canadian Journal of Chemical Engineering (2006–2008). Then, from 2011 to 2013, he was in the editorial board of Nanomaterials and Energy journal. From 2012 to 2014, he served as an associate editor of the Journal of Micro - and Nano-Manufacturing. From 2013 to date, he has been serving as an associate editor of ACS Applied Materials & Interfaces journal.

He was appointed as the secretary, Department of Science and Technology, Government of India on 9 January 2015 and served there till 31 August 2021. He also served as President of Indian National Science Academy from 2023 till 2025.

== Honours and awards ==
He is an elected fellow of prestigious societies such as the Academy of Sciences for the Developing World, Indian National Science Academy, Indian National Academy of Engineering, Indian Academy of Sciences and the National Academy of Sciences, India. In 2002, he received the Shanti Swarup Bhatnagar award in engineering sciences for his "original pioneering contribution to the understanding of the behaviour of thin films and other highly confined nanoscale systems". In the next year, he was awarded Herdillia Award by the Indian Institute of Chemical Engineers. Again, in 2007, he was awarded Distinguished Alumnus Award from the Indian Institute of Technology in Kanpur. And in the year of 2010, Infosys Science Foundation have awarded him with Infosys Prize in Engineering and Computer Science for his "scholarly scientific contributions in the broad areas of nanoscale surface pattern evolution, instability, and the dynamics of thin liquid and solid films and soft matter.".

He is also a recipient of the 2008 TWAS Prize and in 2017 of the H K Firodia award for his pioneering work on colloids, film interfaces, adhesion etc. He is a recipient of the Padma Shri award in 2025, India's fourth-highest civilian award, for Contributions to Science and Public Service by the Government of India.
