= D. D. Bhawalkar =

Indian Optical Physicist

- Born: 16 October 1940 (age 85); Sagar, Madhya Pradesh, India
- Occupation: Laser physicist
- Years active: 1962-present
- Known for: Lasers
- Awards: Padma Shri; Shanti Swarup Bhatnagar Prize; Goyal Prize; Firodia Award; Homi Bhabha Award

Dilip Devidas Bhawalkar is an Indian optical physicist and the founder director of the Raja Ramanna Centre for Advanced Technology (CAT), an institute under the Department of Atomic Energy, serving as a centre for higher studies in the fields of lasers and particle accelerators. He is credited with pioneering research in optics and lasers in India and is reported to have contributed in making CAT a partner in the International Linear Collider and Large Hadron Collider experiments of the European Organization for Nuclear Research (CERN). He is a recipient of the Shanti Swarup Bhatnagar Prize, the highest Indian award in science and technology. The Government of India awarded him the fourth highest civilian award of the Padma Shri in 2000.

== Biography ==
Bhawalkar, born on 16 October 1940 at Sagar city of Dr. Hari Singh Gour University, in the Central Indian state of Madhya Pradesh, completed his graduate (BSc) in 1959 and postgraduate (MSc) studies in 1961 at Sagar University, topping the examinations for which he received Chintamanrao Gold Medal from the university. He continued his studies at Southampton University, securing a master's degree (MSc) in electronics and a doctoral degree (PhD) in lasers and started his career as a member of faculty at the same university in 1966. His career at Southampton was short-lived as he returned to India in 1967 and accepted the job of a scientific officer at the Bhabha Atomic Research Centre (BARC) to continue his work on lasers. He stayed at BARC mainstream till 1987 during which period, he became the section head in 1973 and the division head in 1984.

Bhawalkar was appointed as the founder director when Centre for Advanced Technology was started by the Department of Atomic Energy in 1987. In 2000, when he was due for his statutory superannuation, the government extended his service for a further period of two years, till October 2002. After his retirement in 2002, he joined Quantalase, an organization manufacturing industrial and medical lasers, as its director and holds the post till date.

== Legacy ==
Bhawalkar is one of the pioneers of laser in India and one of the early doctoral scholars in the technology when the discipline was at its nascent stage. He initiated research on lasers at BARC, has been one of the key figures in the establishment of the Centre for Advanced Technology of the DAE at BARC and was involved with the institution from its beginning till his superannuation. During this period, he was instrumental in setting up of various laboratories and facilities of CAT and developing a National Laser Programme for the country. His efforts are reported behind the establishment of research infrastructure and courses on lasers and particle accelerators at BARC training school and behind the introduction of R&D programmes at the Laser Division of BARC. He also mentored 18 research scholars, including two from Southampton University, in their studies.

Bhawalkar is credited with pioneering research on Lasers in India and was the initiator of a new method for measuring weak lensing in gases by employing a Gaussian beam which has since been incorporated in Photothermal spectroscopy. His development of an Nd Glass laser chain for generating 10GW of pulsed power has assisted the subsequent experiments on laser-produced plasmas. He has also contributed to the development of biological and medical applications of lasers. He founded a prototype production facility at CAT which is reported to have supplied over 50 lasers for DAE researches and to the industry. The team led by him is known to have contributed for the setting up of INDUS 1, the first Synchrotron Radiation Source in India and the precursor of Indus 2. It was during his tenure as the director, CAT started its participation in the International Linear Collider and Large Hadron Collider experiments of European Organization for Nuclear Research (CERN). His researches have been documented by over 80 scientific and organizational articles, published in national and international peer reviewed journals.

== Positions ==
Bhawalkar is a distinguished scientist of the Centre for Advanced Technology and a distinguished honorary professor of the Indian Institute of Technology, Kanpur. He served as the coordinator of DAE=CERN collaboration and the Integrated Long Term Programme of Cooperation, an Indo-Russian joint venture on lasers and accelerators and as a member of the steering committee of the International Linear Collider programme. He is the founder president of the Indian Laser Association. He is a member of the Indian Physics Association, and a former member of the Asian Committee for Future Accelerators and the International Committee for Future Accelerators. He chaired the Asian Committee for Future Accelerators (ACFA) and the Advanced Technology Committee of Board of Research in Nuclear Sciences of the Department of Atomic Energy and is a member of C-13 Committee of International Union of Pure and Applied Physics.

== Awards and honours ==
The Indian Academy of Sciences elected Bhawalkar as its Fellow in 1986. The Indian National Science Academy (INSA) and the National Academy of Sciences, India (NASI) followed suit in 1990. He was elected as a Fellow of the Optical Society of America in 1998 and was, subsequently, selected as the Foreign Fellow of the Russian Academy of Natural Sciences. The Council of Scientific and Industrial Research (CSIR) awarded him the Shanti Swarup Bhatnagar Prize, the highest Indian award in the science and technology category in 1984, the same year, as he was selected as the UGC lecturer by the University Grants Commission of India. He received the Goyal Prize of the Kurukshetra University in 1999 and he was included in the 2000 Republic Day honours list for the civilian award of the Padma Shri, by the Government of India. He received one more award, H. K. Firodia Award, in 2000.

== See also ==
- Large Hadron Collider
- Raja Ramanna Centre for Advanced Technology
- Synchrotron Radiation Source
- International Linear Collider
- Large Hadron Collider
- International Union of Pure and Applied Physics
