= Kotcherlakota Rangadhama Rao Memorial Lecture Award =

Prof. Kotcherlakota Rangadhama Rao Memorial Lecture Award
- Civilian award for contributions to Spectroscopy in Physics
- Sponsored by: Indian National Science Academy
- Reward: Rs. 25,000
- First award: 1979

Highlights
- First winner: Prof. R.K.Asundi

Prof. Kotcherlakota Rangadhama Rao Memorial Lecture Award is given for the outstanding contributions in the subject of Spectroscopy in Physics. The award was established by the Indian National Science Academy of Calcutta in the year 1979. The honour is awarded to Indian citizens.

== History ==
The Memorial Lecture Award was established in the year 1979 in the honour of Professor Kotcherlakota Rangadhama Rao by the students of Prof. K.Rangadhama Rao and Indian National Science Academy, formerly National Institute of Sciences of India, Calcutta. The lecture is awarded for outstanding contributions in the field of Spectroscopy. The award carries an honorarium of Rs. 25,000/- and a citation.

The below lists the recipients of the Memorial Award since its inception in the year 1979.

== Recipients ==
Source: Indian National Science Academy

S.No	Name	Birth / death	Awarded	Contribution	Indian state or country of origin
1.	R. K. Asundi	1895 - 1982	1979	Molecules In Interstellar Space	Karnataka
2.	K. Narahari Rao	1921 - 2001	1981	High-resolution infrared spectroscopy. He pioneered improvements in wavelength standards and advanced methods of achieving higher resolution	Andhra Pradesh
3.	Nishtala Appala Narasimham	1922 - 2002	1983	A Search For Organic Molecules In Space : High Resolution Infrared Laser Diode And Radio Frequency Spectroscopic Studies	Andhra Pradesh
4.	V. G. Bhide	1940 - 2006	1985	Research on solid state physics. Research in Mössbauer spectroscopy and its applications to Materials Science.	Nagpur, Maharastra
5.	P. T. Manoharan		1987		
6.	Mihir Chowdhury	1937 -	1989	Work on Two-Photon processes in biomolecules and dynamics of excited state proton transfer.	Kolkata, West Bengal
7.	V. B. Kartha		1991	Laser Spectroscopy In Atomic And Molecular Physics	
8.	Anil Kumar		1996		Bangalore, Karnataka
9.	Ajay K. Sood	1951 -	2000		Gwalior, Madhya Pradesh
10.	N. Chandrakumar		2004	Coherence Transformations and their Applications in NMR Spectroscopy and Imaging	
11.	Dipankar Das Sarma	1955 -	2008	X-ray spectroscopy elucidating the novel physics of strongly correlated systems	Kolkata, West Bengal
12.	Ajit Chand Kunwar		2011		

== See also ==
- List of physics awards
