= K. Vijayraghavan =

Indian scientist

Krishnaswamy Vijayraghavan FRS
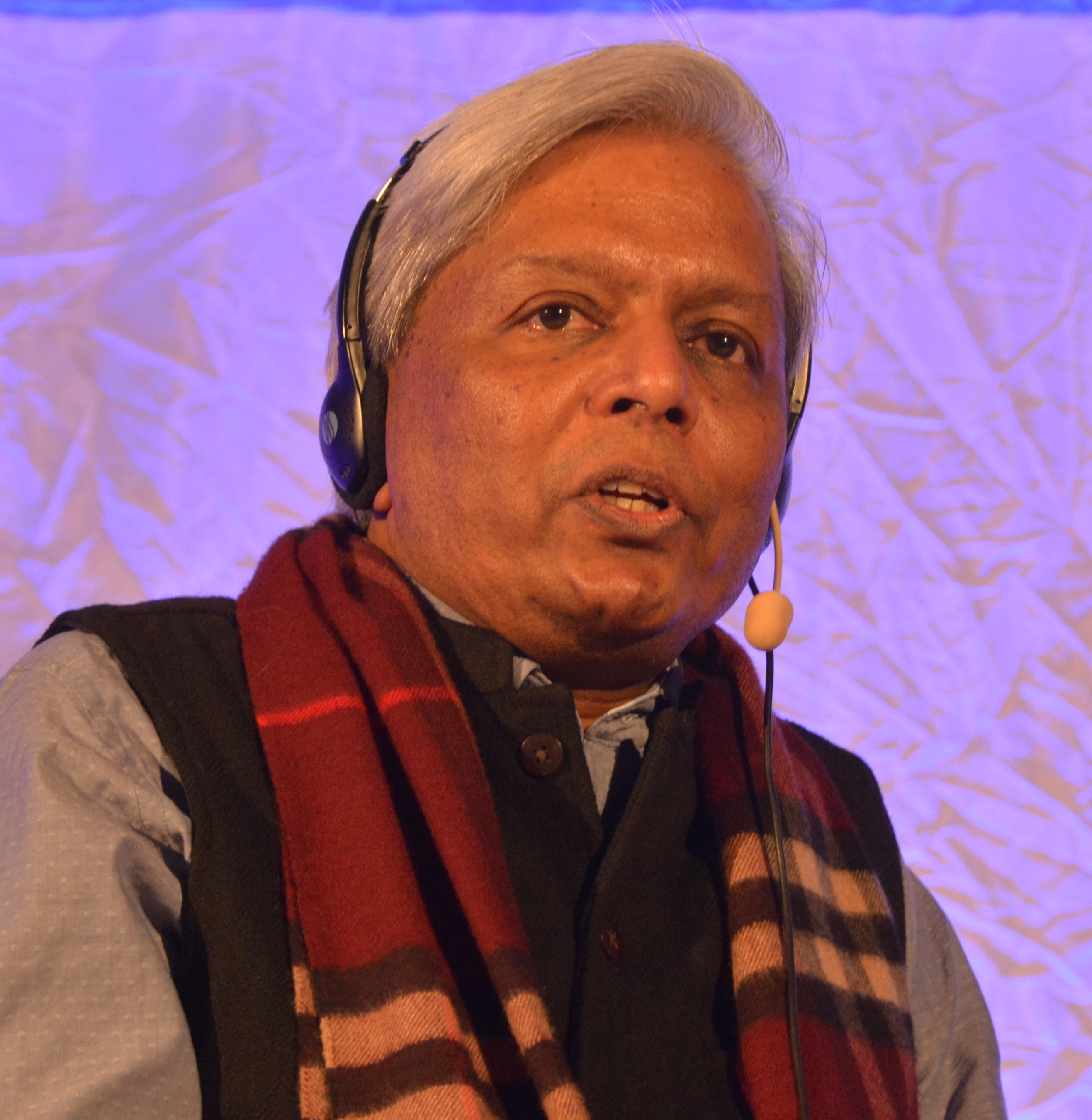
- Vijayraghavan in December 2017

3rd Principal Scientific Adviser to the Government of India
- In office April 2018 – 2 April 2022
- President: Ram Nath Kovind
- Prime Minister: Narendra Modi
- Preceded by: Rajagopala Chidambaram
- Succeeded by: Ajay K. Sood

Personal details
- Born: 3 February 1954 (age 72)

Krishnaswamy Vijayraghavan (born 3 February 1954) is an emeritus professor and former director of the National Centre for Biological Sciences. On 26 March 2018, the Government of India appointed him as the Principal Scientific Adviser to succeed Dr. R Chidamabaram. His term as Principal Scientific Adviser ended on 2 April 2022. In 2012, he was elected a fellow of The Royal Society and in April 2014 he was elected as a foreign associate of the US National Academy of Sciences. He was conferred the Padma Shri on 26 January 2013 and is also a recipient of the Infosys Prize in the life sciences category in 2009.

== Education and early career ==
Vijayraghavan graduated with a Bachelor of Technology degree in chemical engineering from IIT Kanpur in 1975 and a master's in 1977. He completed his doctoral research in 1983 in the field of molecular biology and holds a Ph.D. from the Tata Institute of Fundamental Research. During his post-doctoral work, from 1984 to 1985, he was a research fellow and then, from 1986 to 1988, a senior research fellow at the California Institute of Technology.

== Career in India ==
In 1988, he joined the Tata Institute of Fundamental Research as a Reader and in 1992, when the National Centre for Biological Sciences (NCBS), which is under the aegis of Tata Institute of Fundamental Research was founded, joined NCBS. In August 1991, he moved to Bangalore and was instrumental in the establishment of NCBS in Bangalore. He is an emeritus professor in the field of developmental genetics and former director of the National Centre of Biological Sciences.

His fields of specialization are developmental biology, genetics and neurogenetics. His research primarily focuses on the important principles and mechanisms that control the nervous system and muscles during development and how these neuromuscular systems direct specific locomotor behaviours. This was achieved by using the fruit fly Drosophila melanogaster as a model system. By patterning the segmental organization of the fly body plan, his research was able to shed more light on the functions of Hox genes in directing neuromuscular connectivity and motor behaviours.

Vijayraghavan is a member of the board of governors of the Okinawa Institute of Science and Technology, and a senior editor of the journal eLife. Vijayraghavan was the secretary of Department of Biotechnology (DBT), India, from January 2013 replacing Maharaj Kishan Bhan. to February 2018.

Vijayraghavan led a 9-member committee, under the Prime Minister's Office, to advise on reforms for the DRDO, and the committee submitted its report in January 2024.

== Honors and achievements ==
In 1997, he was elected fellow of the Indian Academy of Sciences.

In 1998, Bhatnagar Prize for Science and Technology award by the Council of Scientific and Industrial Research. In 1999, he became an honorary faculty member of the Jawaharlal Nehru Centre for Advanced Scientific Research. In the same year, he became a fellow of the Indian National Science Academy. He became a member of the editorial board of Journal of Genetics in the year 2000 and a member of the Asia-Pacific International Molecular Biology Network in the year 2001.

In 2003, he received the Distinguished Alumnus Award of IIT Kanpur.

In 2006, he was awarded the J. C. Bose Fellowship.

In 2010, he was elected fellow of TWAS, the Academy of Sciences for the Developing World.

In 2012, he received the H. K. Firodia Award "for his original contributions to the field of life sciences, particularly to developmental biology, genetics and neurogenetics." In the same year he became Fellow of Royal Society.

In 2013, he was conferred the Padma Shri by the President of India.

In April 2014, he was elected a Foreign Associate of the US National Academy of Sciences.

In March 2018, he was appointed as Principal Scientific Adviser to the Government of India.

In 2021 he was elected to the American Philosophical Society.
