= M. S. Ramakumar =

Indian engineer

- Born: India
- Occupations: Roboticist; Nuclear engineer
- Known for: Robotics
- Awards: Padmashri

Mallasamudram Subramanyam Ramakumar was an Indian mechanical engineer, scientist and roboticist, known for developing robotic and automation technologies for Indian nuclear and defence purposes. He was the director of Nuclear Fuels, Automation and Manufacturing Group of the Bhabha Atomic Research Centre (BARC), Trombay. He was the first Head of Division of Remote Handling of Robotics (DRHR) at the organization. He pioneered robotic technology in India. Ramakumar was one of the key persons behind the Pokhran-II test, conducted by India in 1998. It was his team, which developed the online fuelling and coolant channel inspection systems for the power reactors for the 1998 tests.

Ramakumar published several articles on Robotics and Remote handling technologies and peer reviewed a few journals of international repute. He was a member of the advisory board of the Indian Conference on Computer Vision, Graphics and Image Processing, organised by Space Applications Centre of the Indian Space Research Organization (ISRO) at Ahmedabad, in 2002 and was an external examiner of the Indian Institute of Technology, Mumbai. Government of India awarded him the fourth highest civilian award of the Padmashri in 1999.
