= T. S. Prahlad =

Indian scientist

- Born: 21 May 1940 (age 86); India
- Occupation: Aerospace scientist
- Known for: Aerodynamics, Aerospace Design
- Awards: Padma Shri; H K Firodia Award; IISc Distinguished Alumni Award; IE Eminent Engineer Award

Tumkur Seetharamaiah Prahlad (born 21 May 1940) is an Indian aerospace scientist and the former director of the National Aerospace Laboratories (NAL), Bengaluru, known as a specialist in Aerodynamics and Aerospace Design. His contributions are reported in Indian civil aircraft development programmes of Hansa and NAL Saras and light combat aircraft development programme. The Government of India awarded him the civilian honour of the Padma Shri in 2004, The same year, he received the H. K. Firodia Award from H. K. Firodia Memorial Foundation.

== Biography ==
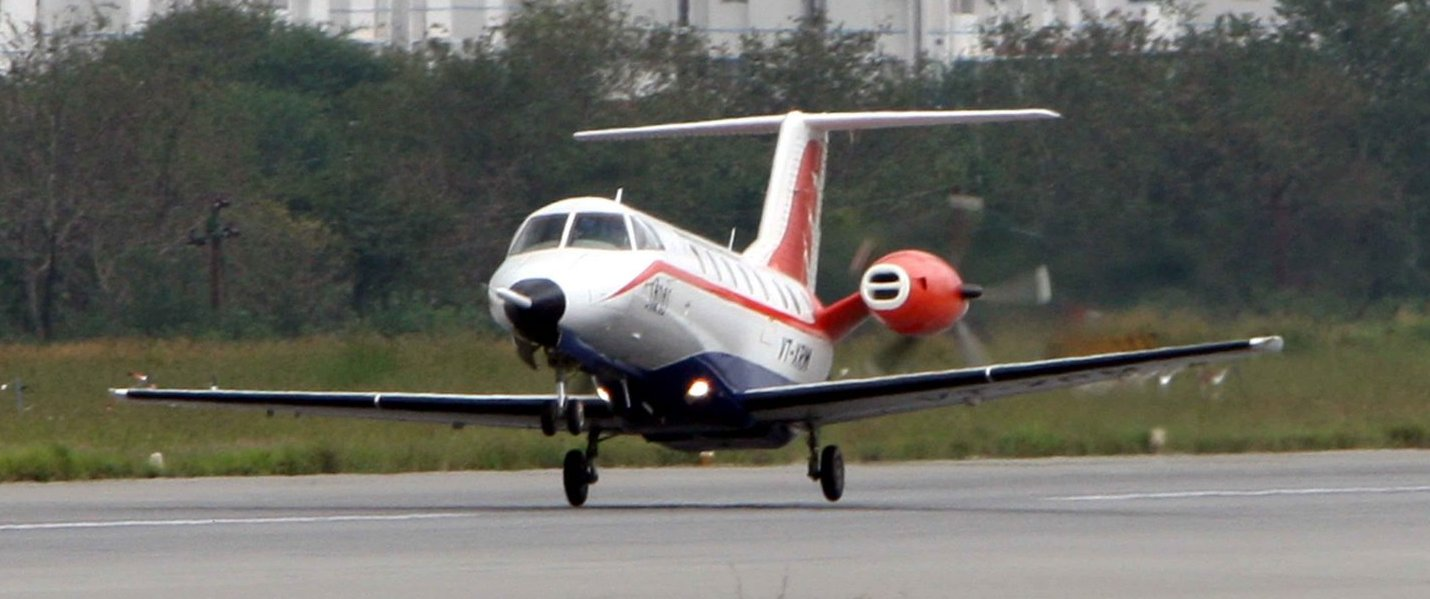
Saras taking off

After graduating in mechanical engineering from the Indian Institute of Science, Bengaluru (IISc), Prahlada continued his studies there to complete his master's degree in mechanical engineering and secured a doctoral degree (PhD) in aeronautical engineering. He started his career by joining Indian Space Research Organization (ISRO) and worked at Vikram Sarabhai Space Centre, Thiruvananthapuram (VSSC), as the head of various divisions such as Aerodynamics Division, Aerospace Dynamics and Design Group, and the Flight Dynamics Group. During his tenure at VSSC, he was involved with development of such space programmes as SLV-3, ASLV, PSLV and GSLV. Later he moved to the Aeronautical Development Agency of the Ministry of Defence where he served as the project director of Light Combat Aircraft development programme.

In 1996, Prahlada joined the National Aerospace Laboratories (NAL) as its director when the civil aircraft programme of the organization was facing difficulties. With encouragement from Raghunath Anant Mashelkar, then director general of the Council of Scientific and Industrial Research (CSIR), he revived the NAL Saras programme and obtained the approval of the Cabinet Committee on Economic Affairs in 1999. Under his leadership, which lasted till 2002, NAL is known to have developed its infrastructure and transformed into a cohesive unit.

Prahlad, whose researches have been documented by several articles, has participated in many scientific projects and workshops and has delivered orations, including the Satish Dhawan Memorial Lecture of 2013. He is the chairman of the Asian Fluid Mechanics Committee, an organization promoting advanced research in Fluid Mechanics. He is a Fellow of the Aeronautical Society of India (AeSI) and the Indian National Academy of Engineering (INAE). The Government of India awarded him the civilian honour of the Padma Shri in 2004 and H. K. Firodia Award of the H. K. Firodia Memorial Foundation also reached him the same year. Five years later, he received two more awards; the Indian Institute of Science Alumni Association honoured him with the 2009 Distinguished Alumni Award and he received the Eminent Engineer Award of the Institution of Engineers. He continues to be associated with the National Aerospace Laboratories is its advisor and lives in the south Indian city of Bengaluru.

== See also ==
- NAL Saras
- National Aerospace Laboratories
