= United Nations Security Council Resolution 1172 =

United Nations Security Council resolution

UN Security Council Resolution 1172
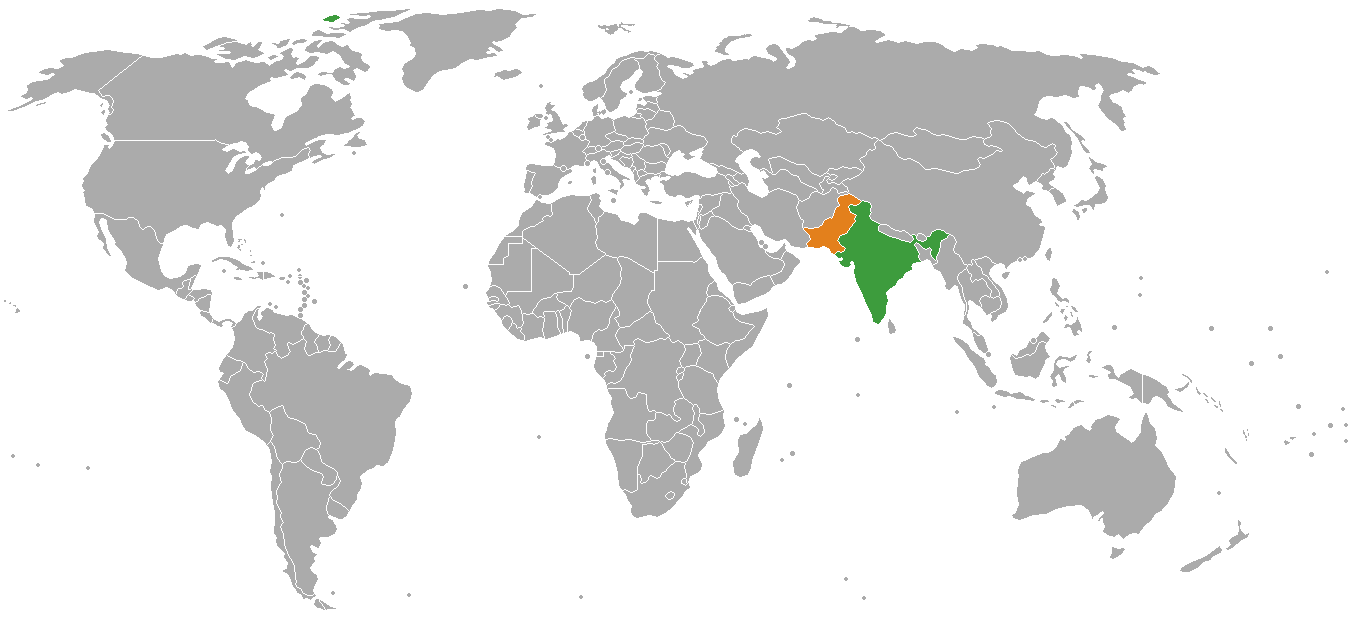
- India (green) and Pakistan (orange)
- Date: 6 June 1998
- Meeting no.: 3,890
- Code: S/RES/1172 (Document)
- Subject: International peace and security
- Voting summary: 15 voted for; None voted against; None abstained
- Result: Adopted

Security Council composition
- Permanent members: China; France; Russia; United Kingdom; United States
- Non-permanent members: Bahrain; Brazil; Costa Rica; Gabon; Gambia; Japan; Kenya; Portugal; Slovenia; Sweden

United Nations Security Council resolution 1172, adopted unanimously on 6 June 1998, after hearing of nuclear tests conducted by India and Pakistan in May 1998, the Council condemned the tests and demanded that both countries refrain from engaging in further tests.

== Resolution ==
The Security Council began by stating that all the proliferation of nuclear weapons posed a threat to international peace and security. It was concerned at the tests conducted by India and Pakistan and of a potential arms race in South Asia. The importance of the Nuclear Non-Proliferation Treaty (NPT), the Comprehensive Nuclear-Test-Ban Treaty (CTBT) and the dismantling of nuclear weapons was emphasised.

The Security Council condemned the Indian Pokhran-II test on 11 and 13 May and the Pakistani Chagai-I test on 28 and 30 May. It demanded that both countries stop testing immediately and asked all countries to no longer carry out nuclear weapons tests. India and Pakistan were also asked to show restraint, refrain from provocative moves and to resume dialogue. Both countries were also called upon to cease their nuclear weapons programmes, cease developing ballistic missiles and fissile material. All countries were urged to prohibit the export of equipment, materials or technology that could in any way assist programmes in either country. The resolution recognised that the tests constituted a serious threat towards global non-proliferation and disarmament.

In return for ending their nuclear programmes, the Security Council had offered to help in the settlement of the Kashmir conflict.

== Reaction ==
The two countries involved reacted angrily to the adoption of the resolution, with the Indian Foreign Ministry describing it as "coercive and unhelpful" while Pakistan said the presence of nuclear weapons in South Asia is now a fact. However, the Government of India noted that the "UN Security Council has recognised that bilateral dialogue has to be the basis of India–Pakistan relations and mutually acceptable solutions have to be found for outstanding issues including Kashmir. This is in keeping with our position."

== See also ==
- India–Pakistan relations
- India and weapons of mass destruction
- List of United Nations Security Council Resolutions 1101 to 1200 (1997–1998)
- Pakistan and weapons of mass destruction
