= Dipankar Das Sarma =

Indian scientist

- Born: 15 September 1955 (age 71); Kolkata, West Bengal, India
- Occupations: Solid State and Structural Chemist
- Spouse: Abha Das Sarma
- Awards: S. S. Bhatnagar Prize; INSA Young Scientist Medal; UNESCO Biennial Javed Husain Prize; Materials Research Society of India Medal; Sir C. V. Raman Award; UGC Hari Om Ashram Trust Award; G. D. Birla Award; IISc Alumni Award; FICCI Award; TWAS Prize in Physics; IITK Distinguished Alumni Award; H. K. Firodia Award; Knight of "The Order of the Star of Italy"; Honorary Doctorate, Uppsala University
- Website: Profile on Indian Institute of Science

Dipankar Das Sarma, popularly known as D.D. Sarma, is an Indian scientist and structural chemist, known for his researches in the fields of Solid State Chemistry, Spectroscopy, Condensed Matter Physics, Materials Science, and Nanoscience. He is a former MLS Chair Professor of Physics and Chairman of the Centre for Advanced Materials and the GAST Professor of Uppsala University, Sweden, A recipient of TWAS Physics Prize and the UNESCO Biennial Javed Husain Prize, Sarma was honored by the Council for Scientific and Industrial Research (CSIR), Government of India, in 1994, with the Shanti Swarup Bhatnagar Prize for Science and Technology.

== Early life and education ==
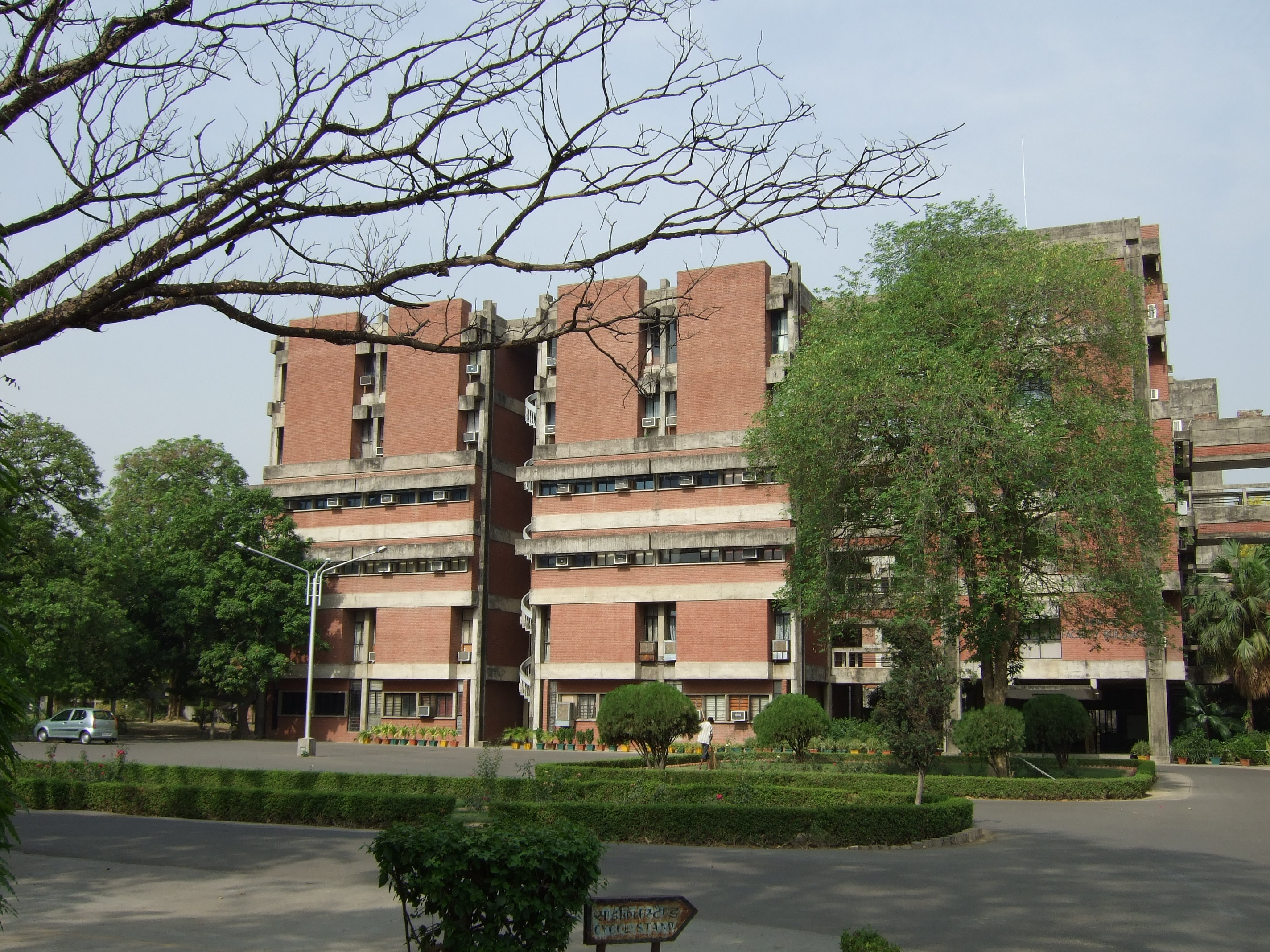
IIT Kanpur-Sarma's alma mater

Dipankar Das Sarma was born on 15 September 1955 in Kolkata, in West Bengal. He did a five-year integrated masters course in Physics from the Indian Institute of Technology, Kanpur in 1977 and enrolled for research at the Indian Institute of Science, (IISc) Bengaluru from where he secured his PhD in 1982 under the tutelage of renowned solid state chemist, C. N. R. Rao.

== Work ==
He worked as a research associate at IISc for one year (1982–83), moved to Forschungszentrum Jülich, (Jülich Research Centre) Germany as a guest scientist in 1984 and returned to IISc as a lecturer in 1986. He stayed at IISc where he became the assistant professor in 1989, associate professor in 1993 and a professor in 1999. He remains a professor at Solid State and Structural Chemistry Unit at the institution. He also served as a visiting professor at the University of Tokyo (2001–02) and at the Istituto di Struttura della Materia, CNR at their Rome and Trieste centres in 2002.

== Positions ==
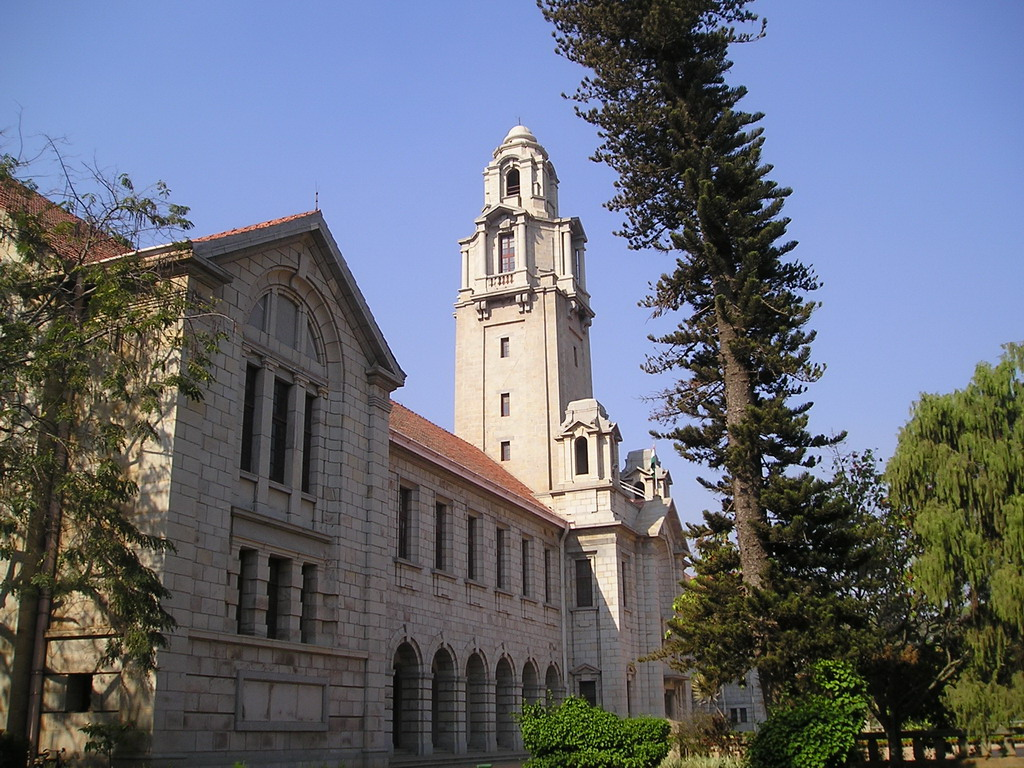
Indian Institute of Science.

Prof. Sarma holds a number of academic positions in India and abroad. Presently, he is J.N. Tata Chair Professor at the Solid State and Structural Chemistry Unit of the Indian Institute of Science. Besides heading the Solid State and Structural Chemistry Unit, he served as a guest professor at the Uppsala University, Sweden, a Distinguished Scientist at the CSIR-Network Institutes of Solar Energy, an honorary professor at the Jawaharlal Nehru Centre for Advanced Scientific Research, Bengaluru and a distinguished visiting professor at the Indian Association for the Cultivation of Science, Kolkata. He has also been an adjunct professor at the Tata Institute of Fundamental Research, Mumbai till October 2014 for a second term, the initial tenure being a six-year period from 2003 to 2009. He also held the position of the distinguished visiting professor at the Indian Association for the Cultivation of Science, Kolkata for two terms, from 2004 to 2006 and from 2009 to 2014. He has also been the adjunct professor of the Indian Institute of Science Education and Research, Kolkata (2007–09), a senior associate at the S.N. Bose National Centre for Basic Sciences (2003-2006), a member of faculty at the UGC-DAE Consortium for Scientific Research. and an MLS Chair professor of the Centre for Advanced Materials.

Prof. Sarma is a member of many professional bodies such as the Council of Raja Ramanna Centre for Advanced Tachnology, Indore, the Steering Committee for the Sophisticated Analytical Instrument Facilities (SAIF) programme of the Department of Science and Technology, Government of India and the Academic Advisory Committee of the Jawaharlal Nehru Centre for Advanced Scientific Research and is the coordinator of the group set up by the Government of India for India's collaboration with the International Centre for Synchrotron-Light for Experimental Science Applications in the Middle East (SESAME). He sits in various committees of the Department of Science and Technology and the Council for Scientific and Industrial Research. He holds the chair of the Research Council of the National Chemical Laboratory, Pune and has held the chairs of the Proposal Review Committee of Elettra Synchrotron Centre, Trieste and the Scientific Advisory Committee of the UGC-DAE Consortium for Scientific Research of which he has also served as a member of the governing body and the governing council.

D. D. Sarma is a former member of the Scientific Advisory Boards of CRANN and Trinity College Dublin, the Scientific Advisory Committees of the Inter University Consortium, Departamento de Asistencia Económica y Financiera, (DAEF) and the Inter University Accelerator Centre, New Delhi, the Academic Program Advisory Committee of the S.N. Bose National Centre for Basic Sciences, Kolkata and the councils of the Indian National Science Academy and the Raja Ramanna Centre for Advanced Technology, Indore. He has also served the scientific council of the Indo-French Centre for the Promotion of Advanced Research (IFCPAR), the general council of the Asia Pacific Centre for Theoretical Physics, Pohang, Korea, and the working group of the Department of Scientific and Industrial Research (DSIR) for the formulation of the 12th Five Year Plan, 2011 as a member.

Prof. Sarma is a Senior Editor of ACS Energy Letters and a member of the editorial boards of several peer reviewed journals such as J. Electron Spectroscopy and Related Phenomena, Solid State Communication, Indian Journal of Physics, and Surface and Interface Analysis. He has also been associated with Advances in Physical Chemistry, Pramana – Journal of Physics, Journal of Physical Chemistry, The Open Condensed Matter Physics Journal and Research Letters in Physical Chemistry, as an editorial board member. He is the Series Editor of Advances in Condensed Matter Science, the South Asian regional Editor for J. Experimental Nanoscience and the Associate Editor of Applied Physics. He is a reviewer for many scientific magazines and the American Physical Society selected him as an Outstanding Referee in 2009.

== Legacy ==
Dipankar Das Sarma is credited with extensive research on nanomaterials and strongly correlated materials. His contribution is reported in discovering the existence of a new phase in solid state materials through high-energy spectroscopies and theory. His researches have been documented by way of several articles published in various peer reviewed journals. Google Scholar, an online repository of scientific articles has listed 656 of Sarma's articles and has accorded him an h-index of 43 (since 2015) and an i10-index of 167 (since 2015) and his articles have been cited over 20000 times. He holds many patents and Justia Patents has an online record of 16 of them.

Sarma is credited with the establishment of the Centre for Advanced Materials, a centre for advanced research on nanomaterials, smart materials, functional polymers, spintronics, strongly correlated electron systems, biomaterials and biology-inspired materials at the Indian Association for the Cultivation of Science. He has attended many national and international seminars and conferences where he has delivered plenary lectures and keynote addresses. He has also mentored many research students for their PhD theses.

== Awards and recognitions ==
Sarma received the Sir J. C. Ghosh Medal in 1981 and the Young Scientist Medal from the Indian National Science Academy in 1983. UNESCO awarded him the Biennial Javed Hussain Prize in 1989 and a year later, in 1990, he received the medal of excellence from the Materials Research Society of India. The Government of India awarded him the Shanti Swarup Bhatnagar Prize in 1994 and he received the C. V. Raman Award in 2004. The year 2005 brought him three awards, the Hari Om Ashram Trust Award by the University Grants Commission, G. D. Birla Award and the Alumnus Award for Excellence in Research from the Indian Institute of Science. He received FICCI Award in 2006, TWAS Prize in Physics in 2007, the National Research Award in 2009 and H. K. Firodia Award in 2013. He was honored with the Knight of "The Order of the Star of Italy" in 2014, and an Honorary Doctorate from the Faculty of Science and Technology at Uppsala University in 2015.

Sarma, an elected Fellow of the Indian National Science Academy, delivered three INSA lectures in 2006, Dr. Jagdish Shankar Memorial Award Lecture, Professor R. P. Mitra Memorial Award Lecture and A. V. Rama Rao Foundation Lecture. Two years later, he delivered the INSA Kotcherlakota Rangadhama Rao Memorial Lecture in 2008. Some of the other lectures delivered by Das Sarma are CSIR Foundation Day Lecture, Distinguished Public Lecture, 8th Atma Ram Memorial Lecture and the Joy Kissen Memorial Lecture, CNR Rao Prize Lecture.

He is an elected Fellow of the American Physical Society, The Academy of Sciences for the Developing World, the National Academy of Sciences, India, and the Indian Academy of Sciences and holds the fellowship of the Asia-Pacific Academy of Materials (APAM). He is also a J. C. Bose National Fellow and Homi Bhabha Fellow.

== See also ==
- Indian Institute of Science
- Indian Institute of Technology, Kanpur
- Spintronics
- Nanotechnology
