= Nishtala Appala Narasimham =

Indian physicist (1922–2002)

- Born: 15 August 1922; Parlakimidi, British India
- Died: 8 April 2002 (aged 79); Mumbai, India
- Education: Andhra University, Visakhapatnam; Banaras Hindu University, Varanasi
- Scientific career
- Fields: Physics, spectroscopy
- Workplaces: University of Wisconsin, University of Oklahoma
- Doctoral advisor: Prof. R.K.Asundi

Nishtala Appala Narasimham, shortly N. A. Narasimham (15 August 1922 – 8 April 2002) was an Indian physicist and spectroscopist.

He was born at Parlakimidi on 15 August 1922. He was graduated in physics (B.Sc.) from Andhra University in 1942 and M.Sc. in physics from Banaras Hindu University (BHU) in 1945. He passed both the examinations with first-class. He has worked as lecturer in physics in Mrs. A.V.N. College, Visakhapatnam and at Bijapur between 1945 and 1949.

He has joined with R. K. Asundi at BHU in 1949 and obtained his Ph.D. in 1952.

He died in Mumbai on 2002 at the age of 79 years. He is survived by wife Kamala and son Prasad.

== Awards and honours ==
- Kotcherlakota Rangadhama Rao Memorial Lecture Award in 1983
- INSA Senior Scientist Award 1985-87
- Sir C. V. Raman Birth Centenary Medal in 1988
- Silver Jubilee Lecture of Andhra Pradesh Academy of Sciences in 1988
- Sanjeevaiah Memorial Lecture of Sri Venkateswara University in 1990
