= Pokhran-II =

1998 series of Indian nuclear weapons tests

Pokhran-II Operation Shakti
- Shakti I prior to its detonation

Information
- Country: India
- Test site: Pokhran Test Range, Rajasthan
- Coordinates: 27°04′44″N 71°43′20″E
- Period: 11–13 May 1998
- Number of tests: 3 (5 devices fired)
- Test type: Underground
- Device type: fission and fusion
- Max. yield: 45 kilotons of TNT (190 TJ)

Test chronology

Pokhran-II (Operation Shakti) was a series of five nuclear weapon tests conducted by India in May 1998. The bombs were detonated at the Indian Army's Pokhran Test Range in Rajasthan. It was the second instance of nuclear testing conducted by India, after the first test, Smiling Buddha, in May 1974.

The test consisted of five detonations, the first of which was claimed to be a two-stage fusion bomb while the remaining four were fission bombs. The first three tests were carried out simultaneously on 11 May 1998 and the last two were detonated two days later on 13 May 1998. The tests were collectively called Operation Shakti, and the five nuclear bombs were designated as Shakti-I to Shakti-V.

The chairman of the Atomic Energy Commission of India described each of the explosions to be equivalent to several tests carried out over the years by various nations. While announcing the tests, the Indian government declared India as a nuclear state and that the tests achieved the main objective of giving the capability to build fission bombs and thermonuclear weapons with yields up to 200 kilotons. While the Indian fission bombs have been documented, the design and development of thermonuclear weapons remains uncertain after the tests.

As a consequence of the tests, United Nations Security Council Resolution 1172 was enacted and economic sanctions were imposed by countries including Japan and the United States.

== History ==
=== Early nuclear programme (1944–1965) ===
Efforts towards building a nuclear bomb, infrastructure, and research on related technologies have been undertaken by India since the end of Second World War. The origins of India's nuclear programme go back to 1945 when nuclear physicist Homi Bhabha established the Tata Institute of Fundamental Research (TIFR) with the aid of Tata Group. After Indian independence, the Atomic Energy Act was passed on 15 April 1948, that established the Indian Atomic Energy Commission (IAEC). In 1954, the Department of Atomic Energy (DAE) was established which was responsible for the atomic development programme and was allocated a significant amount of the defence budget in the subsequent years. In 1956, the first nuclear reactor became operational at Bhabha Atomic Research Centre (BARC), becoming the first operating reactor in Asia. In 1961, India commissioned a reprocessing plant to produce weapon grade plutonium. In 1962, India was engaged in a war with China, and with China conducting its own nuclear test in 1964, India accelerated its development of nuclear weapons.

With two reactors operational in the early 1960s, research progressed into the manufacture of nuclear weapons. With the unexpected deaths of then Prime Minister Jawaharlal Nehru in 1964 and Bhabha in 1966, the programme slowed down. The incoming prime minister Lal Bahadur Shastri appointed physicist Vikram Sarabhai as the head of the nuclear programme and the direction of the programme changed towards using nuclear energy for peaceful purposes rather than military development.

=== Development of nuclear bomb and first test (1966–1972) ===
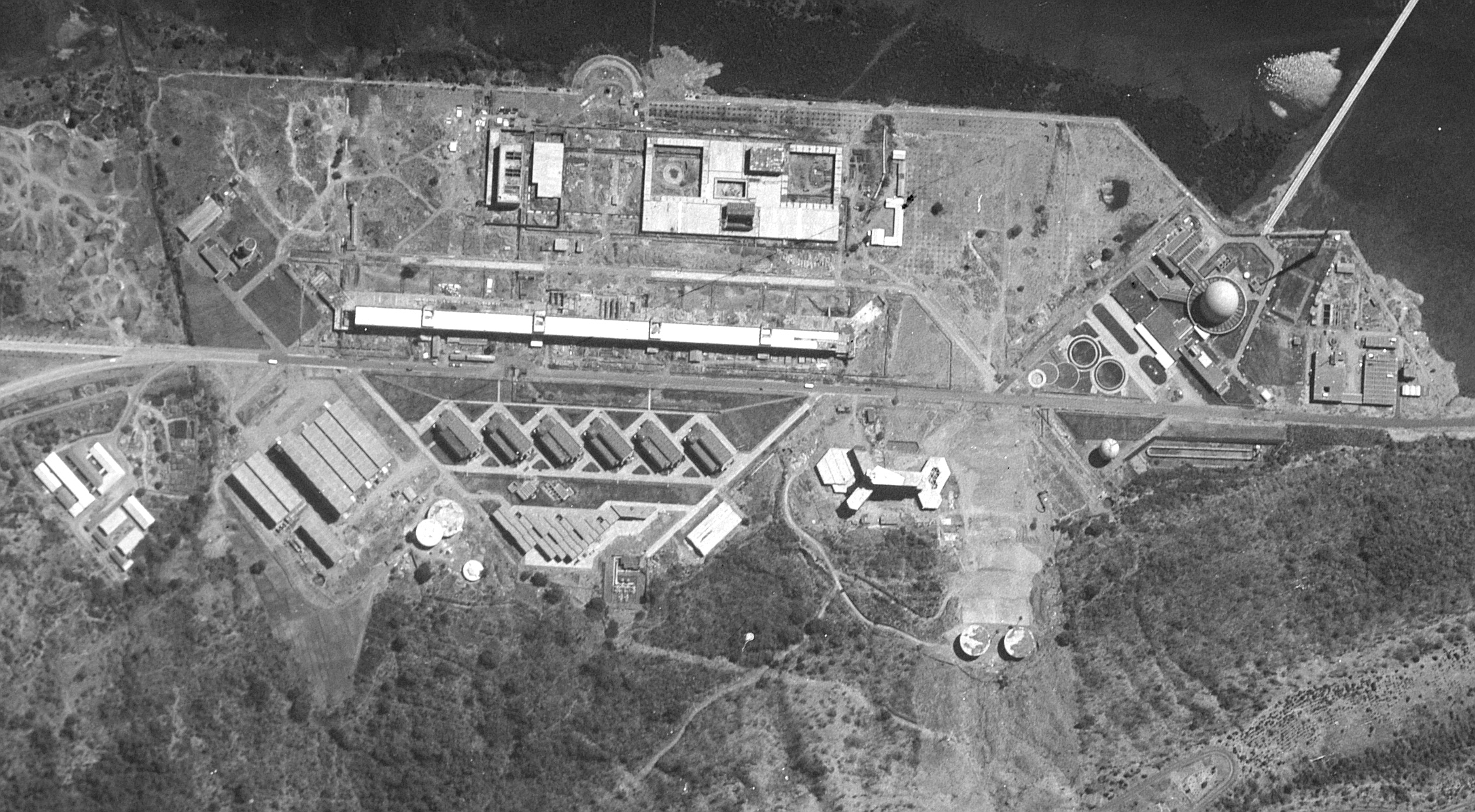
APSARA reactor and plutonium reprocessing facility at BARC as photographed by a US satellite on 19 February 1966

After Shastri's death in 1966, Indira Gandhi became the prime minister and work on the nuclear programme resumed. The design work on the bomb proceeded under physicist Raja Ramanna, who continued the nuclear weapons technology research after Bhabha's death in 1966. The project employed 75 scientists and progressed in secrecy. During the Indo-Pakistani War, the US government sent a carrier battle group into the Bay of Bengal in an attempt to intimidate India, who were aided by the Soviet Union, who responded by sending a submarine armed with nuclear missiles. The Soviet response underlined the deterrent value and significance of nuclear weapons to India. After India gained military and political initiative over Pakistan in the war, the work on building a nuclear device continued. The hardware began to be built in early 1972 and the Prime Minister authorised the development of a nuclear test device in September 1972.

On 18 May 1974, India tested a implosion-type fission device at the Indian Army's Pokhran Test Range under the code name Smiling Buddha. The test was described as a peaceful nuclear explosion (PNE) and the yield was estimated to be between 6 and 10 kilotons.

=== Aftermath of nuclear tests (1973–1988) ===
While India continued to state that the test was for peaceful purposes, it encountered opposition from many countries. The Nuclear Suppliers Group (NSG) was formed in reaction to the Indian tests to check international nuclear proliferation. The technological embargo and sanctions affected the development of India's nuclear programme. It was crippled by the lack of indigenous resources and dependence on imported technology on certain areas. Though India declared to the International Atomic Energy Agency (IAEA) that India's nuclear program was intended only for peaceful purposes, preliminary work on a fusion bomb was initiated. In the aftermath of the state emergency in 1975 that resulted in the collapse of the Second Indira Gandhi ministry, the programme continued under M.R. Srinivasan, but made slow progress. Though the nuclear programme did not receive much attention from incoming Prime Minister Morarji Desai at first, it gained impetus when Ramanna was appointed to the Ministry of Defence.

With the discovery of Pakistan's clandestine atomic bomb program, India realised that it was very likely to succeed in its project in a few years. With the return of Indira Gandhi in 1980, the nuclear programme gained momentum. Two new underground shafts were constructed at the Pokhran test range by 1982 and Gandhi approved further nuclear tests in 1982. But the decision was reversed owing to pressure from the United States as it might end up in nuclear brinksmanship with Pakistan and potential foreign policy implications. Work continued towards weaponizing the nuclear bomb under V. S. R. Arunachalam and the Indian missile programme was launched under A. P. J. Abdul Kalam. Ramanna pushed forward with a uranium enrichment program and despite the sanctions, India imported heavy water required as a neutron moderator in the nuclear reactors, from countries like China, Norway and Soviet Union through a middleman. Though Rajiv Gandhi, who became the Prime Minister in 1984, supported technological development and research, he was sceptical about nuclear testing as he believed it would result in further technological alienation from the developed countries. Dhruva, a new reactor with a capability to produce larger quantities of weapon grade material, was commissioned at BARC in 1985. Other components for a nuclear fusion bomb were developed during the time with capabilities to air drop nuclear weapons. In late 1985, a study group commissioned by the Prime Minister outlined a plan for the production of 70 to 100 nuclear warheads and a strict no first use policy.

=== Building towards second nuclear test (1989–1998) ===
In 1989, V.P. Singh formed the government, which collapsed within two years and this period of instability caused a snag in the nuclear weapons programme. Foreign relations between India and Pakistan severely worsened when India accused Pakistan of supporting the Insurgency in Jammu and Kashmir. During this time, the Indian Missile Program succeeded in the development of the Prithvi missiles. India decided to observe the temporary moratorium on the nuclear tests for fear of inviting international criticism. The NSG decided in 1992 to require full-scope IAEA safeguards for any new nuclear export deals, which effectively ruled out nuclear exports to India.

Though India had stock-piled material and components to be able to construct a dozen nuclear fission bombs, the deliverance mechanism was still under development. With the successful testing of Agni missile and successful trials involving dropping of similar bombs without fissionable material from bomber aircraft in 1994, the weaponization became successful. With the Comprehensive Nuclear-Test-Ban Treaty (CTBT) under discussion and global pressure pushing India to sign, then Indian Prime Minister Narasimha Rao ordered preparations for further nuclear tests in 1995. Based on the direction of the director of DAE R. Chidambaram, S. K. Sikka was tasked with the development of a thermo-nuclear fusion device. In August, K. Santhanam, the chief technical adviser of DRDO, was appointed the director for carrying out the tests.

On 10 September 1996, India voted against a resolution on the CTBT treaty at the United Nations. The resolution passed with a vote of 158–3 with only Bhutan, and Libya joining India in opposing the same. At the planned test site, while water was being pumped out of the shafts constructed more than ten years earlier, American spy satellites picked up the signs in October 1996. After pressure from US President Bill Clinton, the test never progressed as planned, and India withdrew the people from the test area by December. Though the test did not happen, it was estimated that India had enough nuclear fuel to build 20-50 Atomic weapons.

With Rao's term ending in 1996, the next two years saw multiple governments being formed. Atal Bihari Vajpayee, who was a strong advocate of nuclear weaponization, came to power following the 1998 general elections. Vajpayee had earlier declared that if re-voted to power, his government would induct nuclear weapons and declare India's might to gather respect. Soon after assuming power in March 1998, Vajpayee organized a discussion with Abdul Kalam and Chidambaram to conduct nuclear tests. On 28 March 1998, he asked to make preparations for a test.

== Nuclear test ==
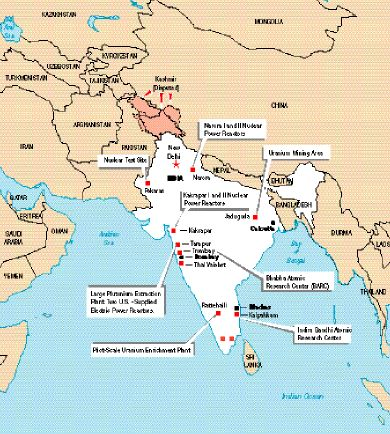
US Marine Intelligence maps showing the Indian test site in 1997

=== Preparation ===
India's Intelligence Bureau had been aware of the capability of the United States spy satellites in detecting Indian test preparations. Therefore, the tests required complete secrecy and the 58th Engineer Regiment of the Indian Army Corps of Engineers was tasked with preparing the test sites without being detected. Work was mostly done during night, and equipment was returned to the original place during the day to give the impression that it was never moved. Bomb shafts were dug under camouflage netting and the dug-out sand was shaped like natural sand dunes. Cables and sensors were either covered with sand or concealed using native vegetation. A select group was involved in the detonation process with all personnel required to wear uniforms to preserve the secrecy of the tests. They were given pseudo-names and they traveled in smaller groups to avoid detection.

Scientists and engineers of BARC, the Atomic Minerals Directorate for Exploration and Research (AMDER), and DRDO were involved in the development and assembly of the bombs. Three laboratories of the DRDO were involved in designing, testing and producing components for the bombs, including the detonators, the implosion and high-voltage trigger systems. These were also responsible for systems engineering, aerodynamics and safety. The bombs were transported moved from BARC at 3 am on 1 May 1998 to Bombay airport, then flown in an Indian Air Force's AN-32 aircraft to Jaisalmer Airport. It was then transported to Pokhran in an army convoy of four trucks, and this required three trips. The devices were delivered to the device preparation building, which was designated as Prayer Hall.

=== Personnel ===
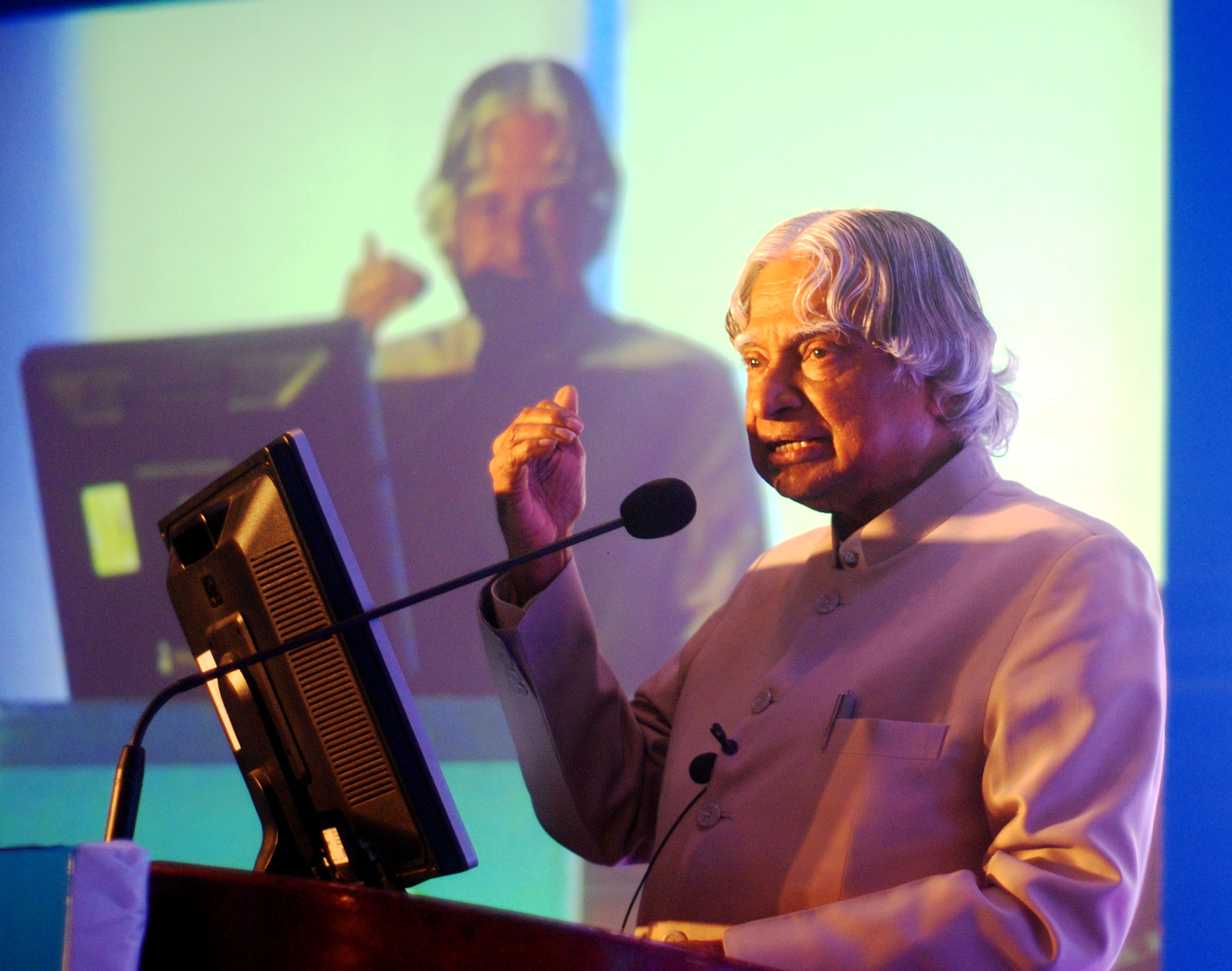
A. P. J. Abdul Kalam was one of the co-ordinators for the test.

Following were the main personnel involved in the testing:

- Chief Coordinators :
  - A.P.J. Abdul Kalam, scientific adviser to the defence minister and chairman of the DRDO
  - R. Chidambaram, chairman of the Atomic Energy Commission and the Department of Atomic Energy
- Defence Research & Development Organization (DRDO):
  - K. Santhanam, director of test site preparations
- Bhabha Atomic Research Centre (BARC) :
  - Anil Kakodkar, director
  - Satinder Kumar Sikka, lead for thermonuclear weapon development
  - M. S. Ramakumar, director of Nuclear Fuel and Automation Manufacturing Group; lead for manufacture of nuclear components
  - D.D. Sood, director of Radiochemistry and Isotope Group; director of nuclear materials acquisition
  - S.K. Gupta, Solid State Physics and Spectroscopy Group; director of device design and assessment
  - G. Govindraj, associate director of Electronic and Instrumentation Group; director of field instrumentation

=== Testing ===
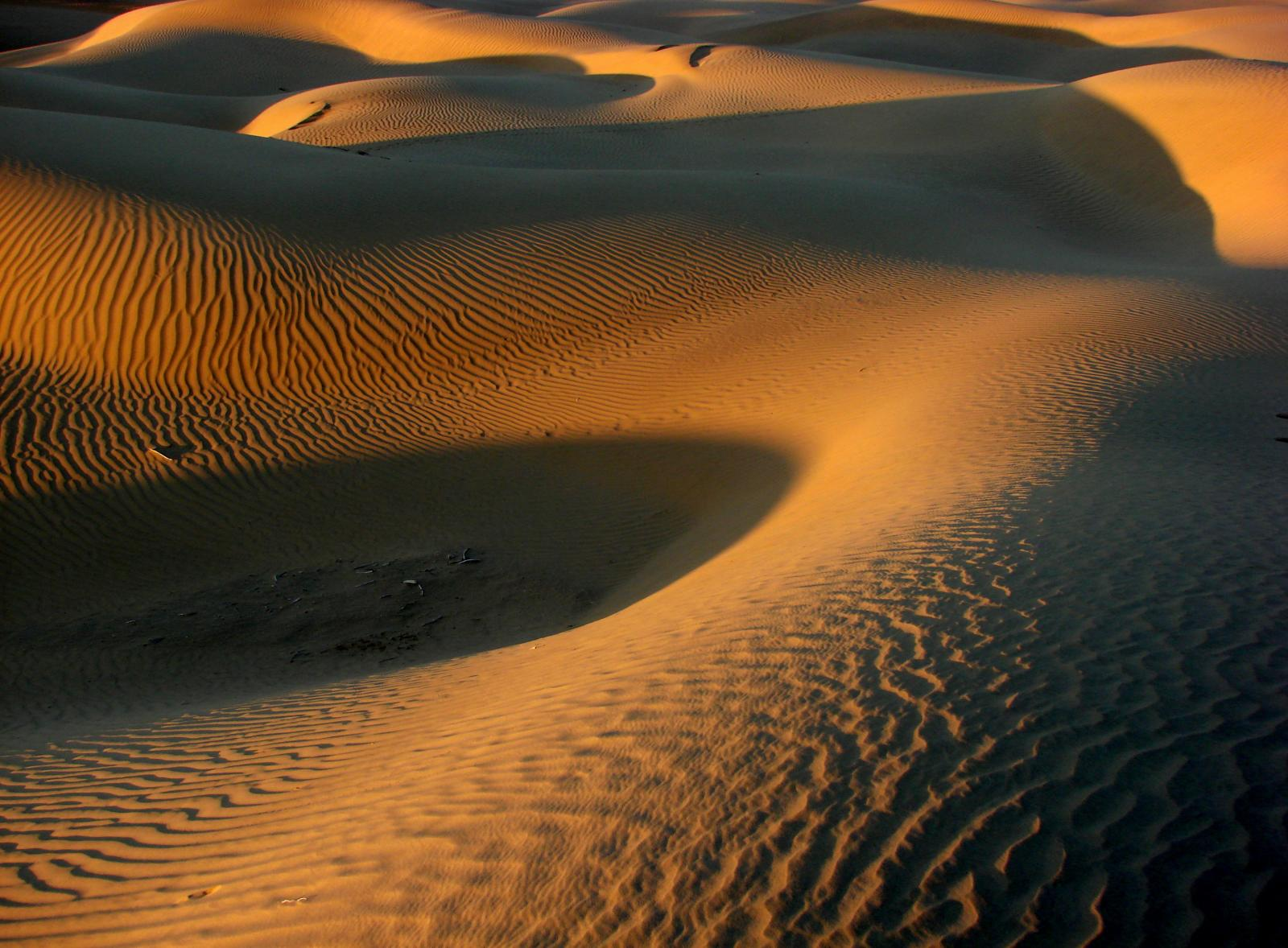
The Thar Desert in the state of Rajasthan where the nuclear site, the Pokhran Test Range, is located

The test was organized into two groups to be fired separately, with all devices in a group fired at the same time. Five nuclear devices were tested during the operation.
Group-I:

- Shakti I: Two stage thermonuclear device with fusion boosted primary, test design yield 45 kt, but designed for up to 200 kt deployed yield
- Shakti II: A light-weight plutonium implosion fission device yielding 12 kt and intended as a warhead that could be delivered by bomber or missile
- Shakti III: An experimental linear implosion fission device that used reactor-grade plutonium, yielding 0.3 kt

Group-II:

- Shakti IV: A 0.5 kt experimental fission device
- Shakti V: A 0.2 kt thorium/U-233 experimental fission device

An additional, sixth device (Shakti VI) was developed but not detonated. The first test was planned on 11 May. The thermonuclear device was placed in a shaft code named White House, which was approximately 230 metres [m] (750 ft) deep, the fission bomb was placed in a 150 metres (490 ft) deep shaft code named Taj Mahal, and the first sub-kiloton device in shaft Kumbhkaran. The first three devices were placed in their respective shafts on 10 May. The first device to be placed was the sub-kiloton device, which was sealed by the army engineers by 8:30 PM. The thermonuclear device was lowered and sealed by 4 AM on the next day with the fission device being placed by 7:30 AM. The shafts were L-shaped, with a horizontal chamber used for the test devices. The timing of the tests was pursuant to the local weather conditions, and the test sequence was initiated in the afternoon. Santhanam, in-charge of the test site, handed over the site to M. Vasudev, the range safety officer, who was responsible for verifying the test indicators. After the safety clearance, the countdown system was activated and at 3:45 PM IST, the three devices were detonated simultaneously. On 13 May, at 12.21 PM IST, two sub-kiloton devices (Shakti IV and V) were detonated. Due to their very low yield, these explosions were not detected by any seismic station.

=== Announcement ===
Having tested weaponized nuclear warheads, India became the sixth country to join the nuclear club. Shortly after the tests, Prime Minister Atal Bihari Vajpayee appeared before the press corps and made the following short statement:

Today, at 15:45 hours, India conducted three underground nuclear tests in the Pokhran range. The tests conducted today were with a fission device, a low yield device and a thermonuclear device. The measured yields are in line with expected values. Measurements have also confirmed that there was no release of radioactivity into the atmosphere. These were contained explosions like the experiment conducted in May 1974. I warmly congratulate the scientists and engineers who have carried out these successful tests.

On 13 May 1998, India declared the series of tests to be over after this.

== Reactions to tests ==
=== Domestic ===
News of the tests were greeted with jubilation and large-scale approval by general public in India. The Bombay Stock Exchange registered significant gains. The media praised the government for its decision and advocated the development of an operational nuclear arsenal for the country's armed forces. The opposition led by the Indian National Congress criticized the Vajpayee Government for carrying out the series of nuclear tests, accusing the government of trying to use the tests for political ends rather than to enhance the country's national security.

By the time India had conducted tests, the country had a total of $44bn in loans in 1998, from the IMF and the World Bank. The industrial sectors of the Indian economy were likely to be hurt by sanctions with the foreign companies, which had invested heavily in India, facing consequences of impending sanctions. The Indian government announced that it had factored the economic response and was willing to take the consequences.

=== International ===
The United States issued a statement condemning India and threatened economic sanctions. The intelligence community felt humiliated for its failure to detect the preparations for the test. In keeping with its preferred approach to foreign policy in recent decades, and in compliance with the 1994 anti-proliferation law, the United States imposed economic sanctions on India. The sanctions on India consisted of cutting off all assistance to India except humanitarian aid, banning the export of certain defense material and technologies, ending American credit and credit guarantees to India, and requiring the US to oppose lending by international financial institutions to India. The United States held talks with India over the issue of India becoming a part of the CTBT and NPT and pressurized to rollback India's nuclear program. India did not accede to the request stating that it was not consistent with her national security interest.

China stated that it was seriously concerned about the tests which are not favorable to the peace and stability in the region and called for the international community to pressure India to cease the development of nuclear weapons. It further rejected claims of India's stated rationale of needing nuclear capabilities to counter a Chinese threat as unfounded. However, the other permanent members of the United Nations Security Council– the United Kingdom, France, and Russia refrained from making any statements condemning the tests.

Few other nations also imposed sanctions on India, primarily in the form of suspension of foreign aid and government-to-government credit lines. Canada criticized India's actions, and Japan imposed economic sanctions which included freezing all new loans and grants except for humanitarian aid.

Pakistan issued a statement blaming India for instigating a nuclear arms race in the region with prime minister Nawaz Sharif stating that his country will take appropriate action. It later carried out six nuclear tests under the code name Chagai-I on 28 May 1998 and Chagai-II on 30 May 1998. Pakistan's leading nuclear physicist, Pervez Hoodbhoy, held India responsible for Pakistan's nuclear test experiments. Pakistan's tests invited similar condemnation and economic sanctions. On June 6, the UN Security Council adopted Resolution 1172, condemning the Indian and Pakistani nuclear tests.

== Aftermath ==
Though the test was carried out in an uninhabited area, the residents of the villages–Odhaniya, Chacha, Loharki, and Khetolai, which were within a five-kilometre radius, felt the effects of the test. The tremors resulted in damage to the houses, and water storage facilities in the villages. The government compensated the villagers whose houses were damaged. A later study found traces of radiation in the water, soil, and vegetation. While the villagers complained of an increase in the rate of cancers and genetic disorders in the years following the explosion, it had not been established with certainty that these were due to radiation exposure.

== Legacy and popular culture ==
The Government of India declared 11 May as National Technology Day in India to commemorate the first of the five successful nuclear weapon tests that were carried out on 11 May 1998. The day is celebrated by giving awards to various individuals and industries in the field of science and technology.

Parmanu: The Story of Pokhran is a 2018 Bollywood movie was based on the nuclear tests. War and Peace is a documentary by Anand Patwardhan, which details the events of the tests.

== See also ==
- India and weapons of mass destruction
- Pokhran-I
