= Krishnamurthy Santhanam =

Indian nuclear scientist (died 2021)

- Born: Tamil Nadu, India
- Died: April 26, 2021
- Occupation: Nuclear scientist
- Known for: Pokhran-II
- Awards: 1999 Padma Bhushan

Krishnamurthy Santhanam was an Indian nuclear scientist and the field director of Defence Research and Development Organization during the tests of Pokhran-II. He was in the news in 2009 when he disclosed that the 1998 tests at Pokhran was not a total success, despite claims by several scientists including Anil Kakodkar and A. P. J. Abdul Kalam. The Indian government, subsequent to these statements & the public pressure that mounted for further tests, ended up not signing the CTBT test ban treaty. Santhanam's statement was subsequently endorsed by P. K. Iyengar, the former chairman of the Atomic Energy Commission of India.

Santhanam is the editor of three books, United Nations: Multilateralism and International Security, India and Central Asia: Advancing the Common Interest and Asian Security and China 2000-2010 and the author of a number of articles. The Government of India awarded him the Padma Bhushan, the third highest civilian award, in 1999.

== See also ==
- Smiling Buddha
