= Principal Scientific Adviser to the Government of India =

Advisor on scientific policy

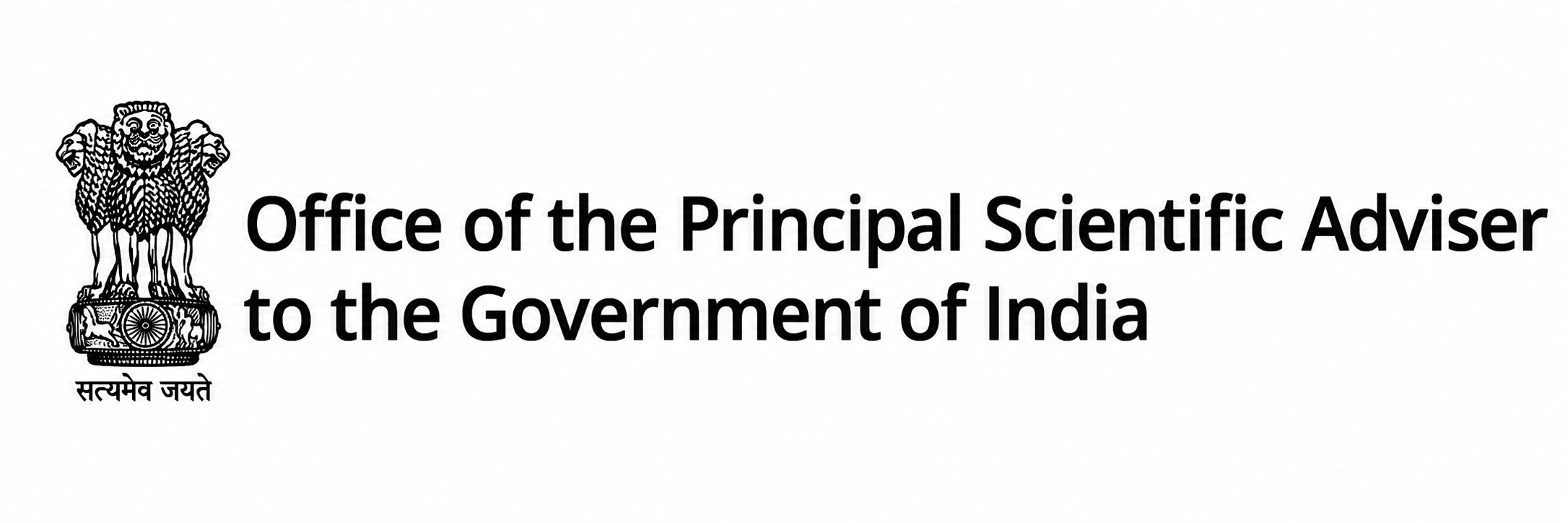
Office of the Principal Scientific Adviser to the Government of India.

The Principal Scientific Adviser (PSA) is the chief advisor to the Government of India on matters related to scientific policy. It is currently a Cabinet Secretary level position created in 1999 by the Atal Bihari Vajpayee government. The first appointed Principal Scientific Adviser was A. P. J. Abdul Kalam. This was followed by Rajagopala Chidambaram who held the rank of a Minister of State and was the PSA for 16 years. The current PSA is Ajay Kumar Sood.

The 'Office of the Principal Scientific Adviser', through the Prime Minister's Science, Technology and Innovation Advisory Council (PM-STIAC) helps scientific cross-sectoral synergy across ministries, institutions, and the industry.

== Appointees ==
There have been a total of four PSAs so far:

No.	Portrait	Principal Scientific Adviser	Took office	Left office	Ref.
1	A. P. J. Abdul Kalam	A. P. J. Abdul Kalam (1931–2015)	1999	2002	
2	Rajagopala Chidambaram	Rajagopala Chidambaram (1936–2025)	2002	2018	
3	K. Vijayraghavan	K. Vijayraghavan (born 1954)	April 2018	April 2022	
4	Ajay K. Sood	Ajay K. Sood (born 1951)	April 2022	Incumbent	

== Office of the Principal Scientific Adviser ==
The Office of the Principal Scientific Adviser to the Government of India advises the government in science and technology policies and interventions that are of strategic socio-economic importance to the country. This is done in collaboration with various ministries, institutions, academia, and industry. The PM-STIAC is one of the catalysts for such tasks and also oversees the implementation of the tasks.

== Agencies ==
1. Society for Electronic Transactions and Security (SETS), Chennai

=== Nine National Missions ===
On 6 March 2019, the PSA announced nine new science and technology missions with a focus on 'Science for People and People for Science':

- Natural Language Translation
- Quantum Frontier
- Artificial Intelligence
- National Biodiversity Mission
- Electric Vehicles
- Bio-science for Human Health
- Waste to Wealth
- Deep Ocean Exploration
- Accelerating Growth of New India's Innovations (AGNIi)

Other major projects include Research Clusters, Earth Museum, Brahmaputra River System, I-STEM Facilities Map, and Energy Security.

== Prime Minister's Science, Technology and Innovation Advisory Council (PM-STIAC) ==
The Council allows the Office of the Principal Scientific Adviser to ascertain the status, challenges and interventions needed in the science and technology domain so as to advise the PM is as best a manner as possible. The PM's STIAC increases the collaboration and focus needed to answer complex problems in appropriate time periods. One of the ways this is done is through various missions.

=== Members ===
Members include:

- V. K. Saraswat, Member, NITI Aayog & former Chairman, DRDO
- A. S. Kiran Kumar, former Chairman, ISRO
- Ajay Kumar Sood, Professor, Indian Institute of Science, Bengaluru
- Lieutenant General Madhuri Kanitkar, Dean, Armed Forces Medical College, Pune
- Sanghamitra Bandyopadhyay, Director, Indian Statistical Institute, Kolkata
- Manjul Bhargava, Professor, Princeton University, USA
- Subhash Kak, Professor, Oklahoma State University, USA
- Baba Kalyani, Chairman and Managing Director, Bharat Forge, Pune

== See also ==
- List of office-holders in India
- Chief Economic Advisor to the Government of India
