= Eli Ruckenstein =

American chemist (1925–2020)

Eli Ruckenstein (August 13, 1925 – September 30, 2020) was an American distinguished professor at the department of chemical and biological engineering, The State University of New York at Buffalo. His main research areas were catalysis, surface science, colloids and emulsions, and bio-compatible surfaces and materials.

== Biography ==
Ruckenstein received his PhD from the Polytechnic University of Bucharest in 1949 and started his academic career as an assistant professor there. In 1969, he was invited to spend six weeks in London at University College and Imperial College. After that he received an invitation as a National Science Foundation senior scientist at Clarkson College. Subsequently, he joined the University of Delaware in 1970 and the University at Buffalo in 1973 as a full professor. He continued to work as a full-time member of the UB faculty and to conduct original research, published in peer-reviewed journal articles, until his death at the age of 95.

== Awards ==
Ruckenstein was the recipient of many awards. The most prominent honors are his induction into the National Academy of Engineering in 1990, and his award of the National Medal of Science in 1998, which is the highest scientific honor bestowed by the United States.
