= Ramanujam Varatharaja Perumal =

Indian scientist

Ramanujam Varatharaja Perumal is an aeronautical scientist and an aerospace engineer of India. He was a director at LPSC, a unit of Indian Space Research Organisation (ISRO).

He was responsible for the flight integration and launch operations of the first three PSLV flights. From 1996 to 2001, he was Project Director of the Geo-Synchronous Launch Vehicle Programme (GSLV). From May 2001 he has been the associate director (projects), Vikram Sarabhai Space Centre (VSSC), Thiruvananthapuram.

He was awarded the Padma Bhushan award by Government of India in 2002.
