= Indus 2 =

Synchrotron located in India

Indus-2 is a synchrotron radiation source with a nominal electron energy of 2.5 GeV and a critical wavelength of about 1.98 angstroms. It is one of the most important projects in progress at the Raja Ramanna Centre for Advanced Technology. It is designed to cater to the needs of X-ray users, material scientists and researchers. Indus-1 has the distinction of being the first synchrotron generator of India with a 450 Mev storage ring. Indus-2 is an improvement over Indus-1.

Indus-2 lattice has been designed in such a way as to give low beam emittance and high brightness. The lattice is a Double Bend Acromat with zero dispersion function along the long straight section. It has eight super periods each having two dipole bending magnets, four focusing and five defocusing quadrupoles and six sextupoles. Of the eight long straight section, three will be used for injection and RF cavities respectively. The remaining five will be used for insertion devices.

The radiation source Indus-2 is in an advanced stage of construction near Indore, Madhya Pradesh.

== Technical specification ==
With a critical wavelength of 1.98 angstroms from bending magnets, it has been designed to cater to the needs of x-ray users. The ring has provisions for insertion of high field wigglers for the production of radiation of shorter wavelengths. It is planned to build a 5 tesla superconducting wiggler to provide radiation with critical wavelength of 1A. In addition, a 1.8 tesla multiple wiggler is also planned.

The storage ring of Indus-2 consists of eight unit cells each providing a 4.5 m long straight section. The unit cell has two 22.5 degree bending magnets, a triplet of quadrupoles for the control of dispersion in the achromat section, two quadrupole triplets for the adjustment of beam sizes in the long straight sections, and four sextupoles in the achromat section for the correction of chromaticities. An additional advantage of this lattice is that the two long gaps between the focussing and defocussing quadrupoles in the achromat section provide a lot of space for accommodating beam diagnostics and vacuum devices. The dynamic aperture with achromaticity correcting sextupoles is more than 30mm in horizontal plane and 20mm in the vertical plane.

The injection energy for Indus-2 is 700 MeV and the electrons in this energy will be injected into it from the 700 MeV synchrotron which is also the injector for Indus-1. The beam lifetime at 700 MeV will be about 30 minutes, adequate to store a 300 mA current. After injection, the energy of the beam will be raised to 2.5 GeV within a few minutes. The beam half lifetime at 2.5 GeV is expected to be about 24 hours. This will be achieved using six RF cavities operating at a total voltage of 1.5 MV at a frequency of 505.812 MHz. One of the straight sections will be used for beam injection, two for RF cavities, and remaining five for insertion devices, which include two wigglers.

As an x-ray source, Indus-2 is envisaged to provide radiation from bending magnets and wigglers. The magnetic field of 1.502 tesla in the bending magnets will generate a radiation at a critical wavelength of 2 angstroms. One wiggler with an 11 pole electromagnet (1.8 tesla) will provide radiation with critical wavelength of 1.66 angstroms. Other wiggler with superconducting magnets with 5 poles and peak field of 5 tesla will provide radiation at 0.6 angstroms. It will be possible to operate Indus-2 at any energy between 700 MeV to 2.5 GeV. It is designed to have more than 15 beam lines for various studies including EXAFS, XANES, x-ray diffraction, x-ray imaging, XRF, and photoemission, Soft and Deep X-ray Lithography etc.
