= Rajagopala Chidambaram =

Indian physicist (1936–2025)

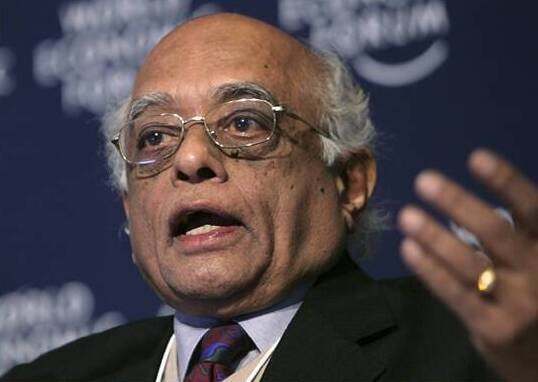
- Chidambaram at the 2008 annual meeting of the World Economic Forum in Davos, Switzerland.

2nd Principal Scientific Adviser to the Government of India
- In office 2002–2018
- President: A. P. J. Abdul Kalam; Pratibha Patil; Pranab Mukherjee; Ram Nath Kovind
- Prime Minister: Atal Bihari Vajpayee; Manmohan Singh; Narendra Modi
- Preceded by: A. P. J. Abdul Kalam
- Succeeded by: K. Vijayraghavan

Personal details
- Born: 11 November 1936 Madras, Madras Province, British India (now Chennai, Tamil Nadu, India)
- Died: 4 January 2025 (aged 88) Mumbai, Maharashtra, India
- Education: University of Madras, Indian Institute of Science
- Known for: Nuclear weapons programme: Smiling Buddha (Pokhran-I); Operation Shakti (Pokhran-II)
- Awards: Padma Shri (1975), Padma Vibhushan (1999)
- Scientific career
- Fields: Physics
- Workplaces: Atomic Energy Commission (India); Atomic Research Centre, Mumbai; Department of Atomic Energy; International Atomic Energy Agency; Defence Research and Development Organisation; Indian Institute of Technology; University of Hyderabad

Rajagopala Chidambaram (11 November 1936 – 4 January 2025) was an Indian physicist who is known for his integral role in India's nuclear weapons program; he coordinated test preparation for the Pokhran-I (1974) and Pokhran-II (1998).

Chidambaram previously served as the principal scientific adviser to the federal Government of India, the director of the Bhabha Atomic Research Centre (BARC)— and later as chairman, Atomic Energy Commission of the Government of India and he contributed in providing national defence and energy security to India. Chidambaram was chairman of the board of Governors of the International Atomic Energy Agency (IAEA) during 1994–95. He was also a member of the Commission of Eminent Persons appointed by the Director-General, IAEA, in 2008 to prepare a report on "The Role of the IAEA to 2020 and Beyond".

Throughout his career, Chidambaram played a key role in developing India's nuclear weapons, being a part of the team conducting the first Indian nuclear test (Smiling Buddha) at Pokhran Test Range in 1974. He gained international fame when he led and represented the team of the Department of Atomic Energy (DAE) while observing and leading efforts to conduct the second nuclear tests in May 1998.

== Academic life ==
Chidambaram was born into a Brahmin Hindu family and completed his early education in Meerut and Chennai, completing his B.Sc. with honors in physics, having stood first rank at the departmental and the university level of the Madras University in 1956. After enrolling in master's program, Chidambaram taught introductory physics laboratory courses and obtained M.Sc. in physics, writing a fundamental thesis on analog computers from the same institution, in 1958. He was accepted for the doctoral programme of the Indian Institute of Science (IISc), and was awarded the PhD in 1962. His thesis contained the research work on the development of Nuclear Magnetic Resonance, and was conferred with the Martin Forster Medal for the best doctoral thesis submitted to the Indian Institute of Science. Chidambaram was a versatile scholar, interested first in physics. After graduating, his interest in nuclear physics diminished and his research interest in physics did not keep him motivated to contribute in his field. Instead, Chidambaram found himself interested in crystallography and condensed matter physics, writing scientific articles which later played an influential role in the development of modern materials science. His contribution to the enhancement of condensed matter physics and material science led him to be conferred with a D.Sc., in physics by the IISc after submitting his doctoral thesis on experiments which he conducted at IISc. He is also a recipient of D.Sc. from MKU, Madurai. He has been conferred doctoral degrees in physics by eight Indian universities. After the test of the nuclear device at Pokharan in 1974, Chidambaram started 'open research' in the area of high pressure physics. For this a complete range of instrumentation such as diamond anvil cells, and gas-gun for launching projectiles were indigenously built. He also laid the foundation of theoretical high-pressure research for calculation of equation of state and phase stability of materials by first principles techniques. The papers published by his high pressure group are also well cited. The one on 'Omega Phase in Materials' is considered a textbook by researchers in Condensed Matter Physics/ Materials Science.

== Nuclear program ==
After receiving his doctorate in physics, Chidambaram joined the Bhabha Atomic Research Centre (BARC). He served as the director of the physics group initiating research on physical aspects of nuclear weapons. At BARC, he rose to become one of the senior nuclear scientists involved in various classified projects, and was one of the central figures building the nuclear programme. In 1967, Chidambaram joined the nuclear weapon designing effort along with his fellow scientists in constructing and building the metallurgical and physical aspects of the nuclear weapons. He and his colleagues worked out the equation of state of plutonium, which is still classified by all nuclear weapon states. He chose the implosion method and initiated research at BARC in very close interaction with the Terminal Ballistics Research Laboratory (TBRL) of the Defence Research and Development Organisation (DRDO) to achieve this. Chidambaram also assisted the Indian Army to construct a nuclear test site at long-constructed Indian Army base, Pokhran Test Range in Rajasthan, Chidambaram was part of a team of scientists who participated in and supervised India's first nuclear test, codename Smiling Buddha, and was one of the scientists who were honoured by Indian Premier Indira Gandhi. Finally, in 1990, Chidambaram became Director of the BARC. His key participation in the design and successful execution of Operation Smiling Buddha saw him leading the DAE team of Operation Shakti in 1998. As the director of BARC, he initiated the development of super-computers, which now have multi-teraflop speed capability. During his chairmanship of the Atomic Energy Commission, he accelerated the development of nuclear power. Upset by the secret manner in which the test was conducted, and given his instrumental role in the test, Chidambaram was not positively reciprocated when he approached the US for a visa to attend the 1998 annual conference of the International Union of Crystallography, of which he was the then vice-president, which was followed by his withdrawal of the visa application.

== As Principal Scientific Adviser ==
Dr. R. Chidambaram was Principal Scientific Adviser to the Government of India (until Dr. Krishnasamy Vijay Raghavan, replaced him in March 2018) and Chairman of the Scientific Advisory to the Cabinet of the Federal Government. Some of his initiatives as Principal Scientific Adviser, including the setting up of the Core Advisory Group for R&D in the Automotive Sector (CAR) to increase academia-industry interaction, the creation of RuTAGs (Rural Technology Action Groups) for effective need based technology delivery in rural areas, the establishment of SETS (Society for Electronic Transactions and Security), are making significant impact. During the last few years, he along with National Informatic Center helped conceptualise and supervise the setting up of the high-speed 'National Knowledge Network' to connect about 1,500 educational and research institutions in India. He has emphasized the need for 'Coherent Synergy' (a phrase he has coined) in India's Science & Technology (S&T) efforts to take India on a sustained fast-growth path. He has also focused on the importance of 'Directed Basic Research' as an addition to (not a substitute for) self-directed basic research.

== Awards and honours ==
Chidambaram was the recipient a number of awards and honours. The Indian Government acknowledged his contribution to the successful nuclear tests by awarding the Padma Shri, the fourth highest Civilian honour of the nation, in 1975 and the Padma Vibushan, the second highest civilian honour, in 1999. His other prominent awards are the Distinguished Alumnus Award of the Indian Institute of Science (1991), the C.V. Raman Birth Centenary Award of the Indian Science Congress Association (1995), the Distinguished Materials Scientist of the Year Award of the Materials Research Society of India (1996), the R.D. Birla Award of the Indian Physics Association (1996), the H. K. Forodia Award for Excellence in S & T (1998), the Hari Om Prerit Senior Scientist Award (2000), the Meghnad Saha Medal of the Indian National Science Academy (2002), the INS Homi Bhabha Lifetime Achievement Award of the Indian Nuclear Society (2006), the Life Time Contribution Award in Engineering (2009) from Indian National Academy of Engineering, the C.V. Raman Medal of the Indian National Science Academy. Dr. R. Chidambaram was the recipient of the Rajiv Gandhi Outstanding Leadership National Award for the Year-2011 from the Academy of Grassroots Studies and Research of India (AGRASRI), Tirupati on 29 February 2012 at Tirupati. Dr. Chidambaram has delivered the 10th Rajiv Gandhi Memorial Lecture on 29 February 2012 at Tirupati. He has been awarded D.Sc. degrees (Honoris Causa) by more than twenty universities in India and abroad. Chidambaram was a Fellow of all the science Academies in India and The World Academy of Science (TWAS), Trieste (Italy). He has also served as a member, chairman and president of a number of organizations which, among others, include IIT-Madras, IIT-Bombay, the Materials Research Society of India, the Council of Scientific and Industrial Research (CSIR), and the International Union of Crystallography. In early 2008, the IAEA invited Chidambaram to be a member of the "Commission of Eminent Persons", for making recommendations to the Board of Governors, regarding long-term priorities and funding. He was Indian Fellow of Indian National Science Academy. Dr. Chidambaram was chairman of Board of Governance of IIT Jodhpur.

== Death ==
Chidambaram died on 4 January 2025, at the age of 88, in Mumbai.
