= Ajay K. Sood =

Indian physicist (born 1951)

Ajay Kumar Sood FRS
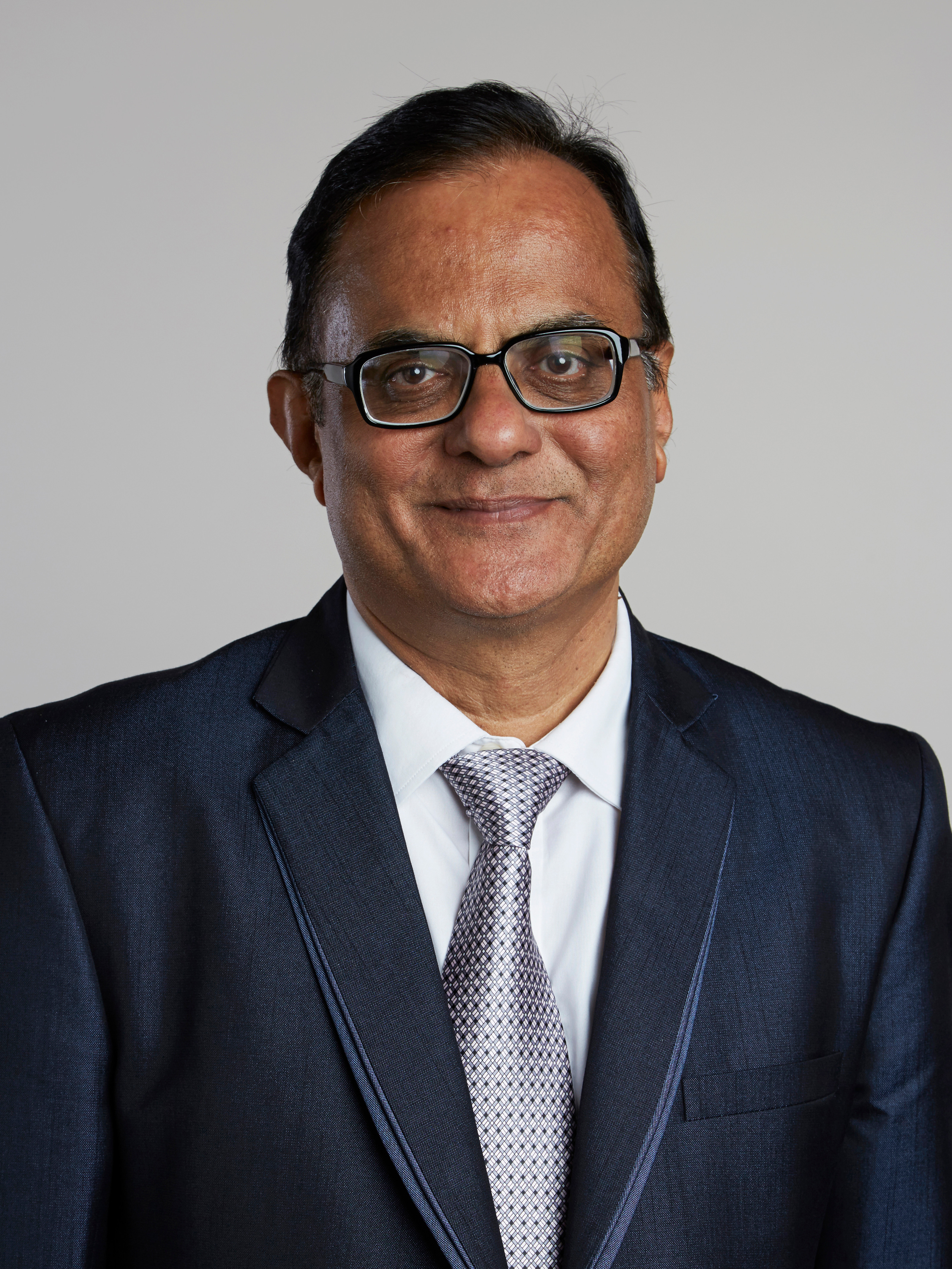
- Sood in 2015 (portrait from the Royal Society)

4th Principal Scientific Adviser to the Government of India
- Incumbent
- Assumed office April 2022
- Preceded by: K. Vijayraghavan

Personal details
- Born: Ajay Kumar Sood; 26 June 1951 (age 75) Gwalior, Madhya Pradesh, India
- Education: Indian Institute of Science
- Awards: Padma Shri; FRS (2015); Materials Research Society (India) Medal
- Website: physics.iisc.ernet.in/~asood

Ajay Kumar Sood (born 26 June 1951) is an Indian physicist and researcher currently serving as the 4th Principal Scientific Adviser to the Government of India.

He holds two United States and five Indian patents, and has contributed to research on graphene and nanotechnology. He is a Distinguished Honorary Professor of Physics at the Indian Institute of Science, Bangalore.

He was awarded the Padma Shri by the Government of India in 2013 for his contributions to science and technology. He was elected a Fellow of the Royal Society (FRS) in 2015.

Since 2019, he has served on the Physical Sciences jury for the Infosys Prize. He is an associate editor of ACS Nano.

== Biography ==
The sound of music is also deep physics. Of course, you don't need to know that to appreciate music says Dr. Ajay K. Sood.

Ajay Kumar Sood was born on 26 June 1951, in Gwalior, India. He obtained a BSc (Hons) degree in physics in 1971 and a MSc (Hons) degree in 1972 from Punjab University, Chandigarh.

In 1973, he joined the Indira Gandhi Centre for Atomic Research, Kalpakkam, where he worked until 1988. During this period, he pursued doctoral research at the Indian Institute of Science, obtaining a PhD in 1982. He subsequently carried out postdoctoral research at the Max Planck Institute für Festkörperforschung, Stuttgart, Germany, from 1983 to 1985.

The Indian Institute of Science (IISc) offered Sood the post of an associate professor at the institution in 1988, which he accepted. In 1994, he was promoted as the professor of the Department of Physics at IISc. Four years later, he rose to the position of the chairman of the Division of Physical and Mathematical Sciences, IISc, which he held until 2008. Sood has also been holding the position of the honorary professor at the Jawaharlal Nehru Centre for Advanced Scientific Research, Bengaluru since 1993.

Sood lives in Bengaluru, Karnataka state, India, associating himself with the Indian Institute of Science and the Jawaharlal Nehru Centre for Advanced Scientific Research.

== Research and legacy ==
Sood has done research on hard condensed matter and soft condensed matter physics, with special emphasis on Raman scattering and nanotechnology.

=== Research on resonance Raman studies ===
Sood, along with his team of scientists at the Indian Institute of Science, has done experiments on semiconductor superlattices, fullerenes, solid C60, C70 and single walled carbon nanotubes and optical phonons. They were successful in exciting squeezed phonon states in KTa03 crystals using femtosecond laser pulses and employing impulsive simulated Raman scattering. He has also shown that liquid flow in a singled walled carbon nanotube induces the voltage and current to flow along the floor direction of the tube.

=== Other research efforts ===
Sood has also experimented with soft condensed matter like micelle composed viscoelastic gels. He developed an ultrasensitive immunoassay by subjecting colloids to an electrical field, thus generating nonequilibrium phenomena. He has developed a medical diagnostic kit.

Sood is now working on the modalities of enhancing the viscosity of a material by adding nanotubes without increasing its weight.

== Academic fellowships and positions ==
Sood is a fellow of science academies and institutions such as the Indian Academy of Sciences (FASc) (1991), the Indian National Science Academy (FNA) (1996), The World Academy of Sciences (FTWAS) (2002) and the National Academy of Sciences, India (FNASc) (1995) and holds the Bhatnagar Chair of the Council of Scientific and Industrial Research. He is the incumbent secretary general of The World Academy of Sciences and a former president of the Indian Academy of Sciences from 2010 to 2012 and the vice-president of the Indian National Science Academy from 2008 to 2010. He also served as a member of the Asia-Pacific Academy of Materials in 2008.

Sood was an executive editor of Solid State Communications. He is also an editorial board member of the journals, Scientific Reports, Particle and EPL (Europhysics Letters).

Sood has served on the scientific advisory committee to the prime minister of India from 2009 to 2014, and is the chairman of the National Physical Laboratory, New Delhi.

== Awards and recognitions ==
He was awarded Shanti Swarup Bhatnagar Prize, in 1990, by the Government of India. In 2013, the Government of India followed it up with the fourth highest civilian award, Padma Shri.

The Third World Academy of Sciences (TWAS) recognised Sood's services by conferring on him the TWAS Prize in Physics, in 2000. The same year, he received four more awards viz. G. D. Birla Science Award, Federation of Indian Chambers of Commerce and Industry (FICCI) Award, Materials Research Society (India) Medal and Millennium Gold Medal of Indian Science Congress. Two years later, in 2002, he received the Homi Jehangir Bhabha Medal of Indian National Science Academy. The next year, in 2003, he was selected for the Indian Institute of Science (IISc) Alumni Award for Excellence in Research for Science. Three more awards came his way the same year, viz. M. N. Saha Birth Centenary Award of the Indian Science Congress, Sir C. V. Raman Award of the University Grants Commission and the Goyal Prize in Physics. Sood was elected a Fellow of the Royal Society (FRS) in 2015 and in 2026 was elected a Corresponding Member of the Australian Academy of Science.

== See also ==
- Graphene
- Soft matter
- Raman scattering
- Nanotechnology
- Indian Institute of Science
- Jawaharlal Nehru Centre for Advanced Scientific Research
