= OSP =

OSP or Osp may refer to:

== Places ==
- Osp, a valley and a village in Slovenia

== Biology ==
- Outer surface proteins (Osp), expressed in the outer membrane of some gram-negative bacteria, particularly Borrelia burgdorferi

== Organizations ==
- Oblate Sisters of Providence, a Roman Catholic women's religious institute
- Office of Special Plans, a U.S. intelligence unit (2002–2003)
- Onafhankelijke Socialistische Partij (Independent Socialist Party), a revolutionary socialist political party in the Netherlands
- Orchestra of St Paul's, a professional chamber orchestra resident at the Actors' Church, London
- Oregon Star Party, an annual event in the United States for observational astronomy
- Oregon State Police, an American law enforcement agency

== Technology ==
- Online service provider, a supplier of internet content
- Open Settlement Protocol, a standard for ISPs to exchange information on IP telephony
- Open Source Physics, a project to encourage open source code libraries for numerical simulation
- Open Specification Promise, a legal statement concerning use of Microsoft intellectual property
- Open Syllabus Project, an open-source syllabus database
- OpenShot, a free and open-source video editor for Windows, macOS, Linux, and ChromeOS
- Operating System Projects, an environment for teaching about computer systems
- Orbital Space Plane, a NASA concept to support the International Space Station
- Organic solderability preservative, a method for coating printed circuit boards
- Outside plant, the telecommunications or electrical cabling between supplier and customer

== Other ==
- Ovince St. Preux, an American martial artist known as OSP
- Orthosymplectic group
