= 1951 in radio =

The year 1951 saw a number of significant happenings in radio broadcasting history.

== Events ==
- 4 March – Sir John Gielgud appears in the role of Hamlet on The United States Steel Hour.
- 29 May – Radio Nacional de España opens its new transmitter in Sevilla.
- 9 June – Radiodiffusion-Télévision Française launches Radio-Cayenne, French Guiana's first radio station, which at first broadcasts for only two hours each week.
- 1 September – The Chubu-Nippon Broadcasting Company (CBC), Japan's first commercial radio station, begins regular broadcasts from Nagoya.
- 1 October – In Denmark, Statsradiofonien begins radiating Program II, a second, alternative radio service from six new medium-wave transmitters in various locations around the country. Statsradiofonien's existing long-wave service, broadcast from the Kalundborg transmitter, is known from this date as Program I.

== Debuts ==
- 1 January – The Archers production series debuts on the BBC Light Programme; it will still be broadcast 65 years later as the world's longest-running radio "soap".
- 21 January - Mr. and Mrs. Blandings debuts on NBC.
- 1 April – Paul Harvey News and Comment begins its 59-year-long run on the ABC Radio Network.
- 7 April – Alias Jane Doe debuts on CBS.
- 28 May – The Goon Show is first broadcast on the BBC Home Service in the UK. The first series is entitled "Crazy People".
- 2 July – The New Adventures of Dan Dare, Pilot of the Future is first broadcast on Radio Luxembourg, running for 5 years.
- 6 July – Defense Attorney debuts on ABC.
- 11 July – Alan Freed, the self-proclaimed "King of the Moondoggers," launches "The Moondog House" on WJW (AM) in Cleveland, Ohio (today WKNR). The nighttime program, dedicated to playing rhythm and blues records (of which Freed makes the first known usage of the term "rock 'n roll" to refer to the music), is sponsored by a local record shop owned by Leo Mintz.
- 18 August – ABC Dancing Party is first broadcast.
- 21 August – Black Night (a musical variety show) debuts on ABC.
- 3 October – Barrie Craig, Confidential Investigator debuts on NBC.
- 19 October – The CBS "Eye" logo debuts on TV shows and radio printed schedules.
- 21 October – WLOU, Louisville completes conversion to a full-time Rhythm and Blues format which lasts until 1995.

== Endings ==
- 5 January – The serial David Harum ends its run on network radio (CBS).
- 25 January – We, the People ends its run on network radio (NBC).
- 27 April – The Adventures of Sam Spade, Detective ends its run on network radio.
- 11 May – Hannibal Cobb ends its run on network radio (ABC).
- 20 May – Candy Matson ends its run on network radio (NBC West Coast).
- 11 June – Bob Elson on Board the Century ends its run on network radio (Mutual).
- 17 June - Mr. and Mrs. Blandings ends its run on network radio (NBC).
- 1 July – Charlie Wild, Private Detective ends its run on network radio (CBS).
- 19 July – I Fly Anything ends its run on network radio (ABC).
- 22 July – Meet Frank Sinatra ends its run on network radio CBS.
- 28 August – The Bickersons ends its run on network radio (CBS).
- 8 September Make Believe Town ends its run on network radio (CBS).
- 14 September – Death Valley Days ends its run on network radio (ABC).
- 15 September – The Adventures of Philip Marlowe ends its run on network radio (CBS).
- 22 September – Alias Jane Doe ends its run on network radio (CBS).
- 25 September – Black Night (musical variety show) ends its run on network radio (ABC).
- 26 September – American Agent ends its run on network radio (ABC).
- 26 September – The Fat Man ends its run on network radio (ABC).
- 28 September – Screen Directors Playhouse ends its run on NBC.
- 19 November – The American Album of Familiar Music ends its run on network radio (ABC).
- 16 December – The Tom Mix Ralston Straight Shooters ends its run on network radio (Mutual).
- 17 December - Murder by Experts ends its run on network radio (Mutual).
- 30 December – The Carnation Contented Hour ends its run on network radio (CBS).
- 31 December – Hashknife Hartley ends its run on network radio (Mutual).

== Births ==
- 12 January – Rush Limbaugh, American radio personality, conservative political commentator (died 2021).
- 2 February – Ken Bruce, Scottish radio presenter.
- 1 March – Deborah Byrd, American science journalist, creator and executive producer of internationally syndicated Earth & Sky radio series.
- 13 March – Angelo Cataldi, sports radio personality for WIP in Philadelphia.
- 22 April – Irwin Chusid, journalist, music historian and New Jersey radio personality.
- 13 May – James Whale, English radio presenter.
- 22 July – Richard Bey, American television and radio talk show host.
- 9 August – James Naughtie, Scottish journalist and radio presenter.
- 27 August – Skip Bayless, American sports media personality.
- 20 September – John Lloyd, English comedy producer.
- 7 November – Tom Barnard, Minneapolis-St. Paul radio talk show host and voice-over talent.
