= Star party =

Gathering of amateur astronomers

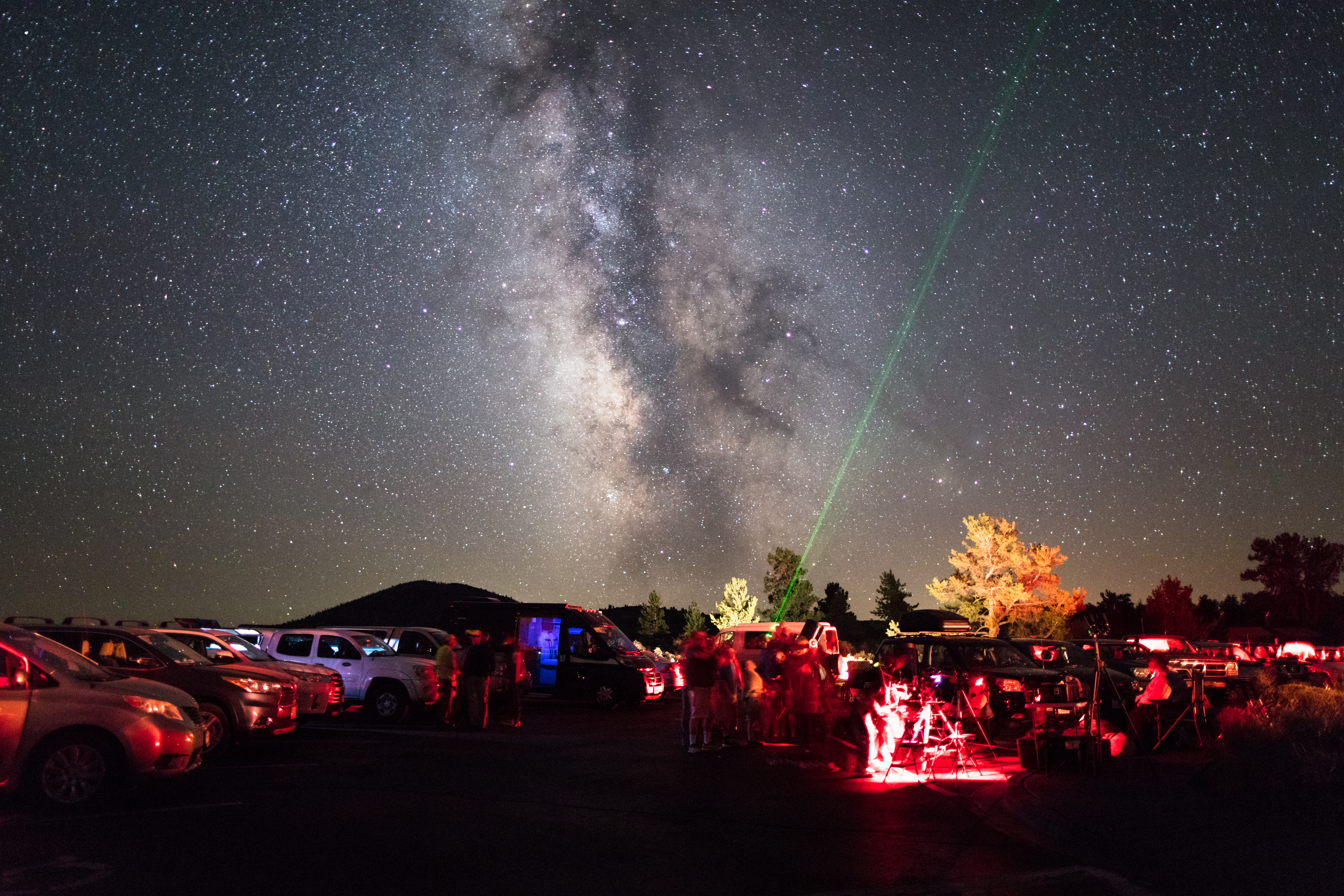
Star party in Idaho

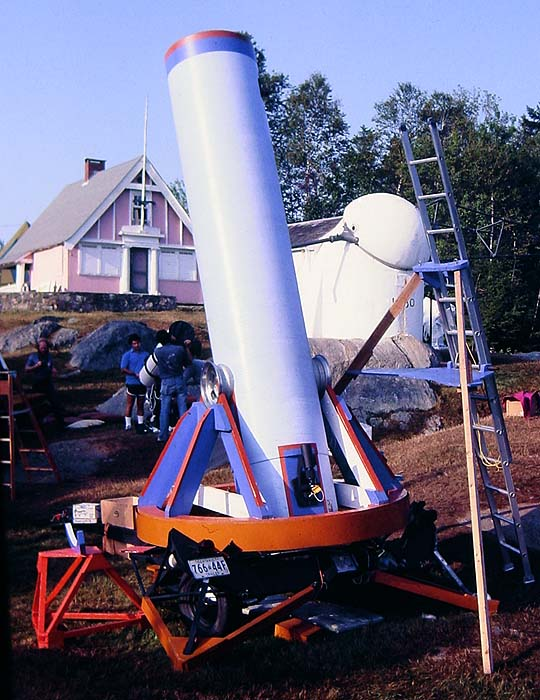
A trailer-mounted Newtonian telescope on daytime display at the Stellafane star party in Vermont.

A star party is a gathering of amateur astronomers for the purpose of observing objects and events in the sky. Local star parties may be one-night affairs, but larger events can last a week or longer and attract hundreds or even thousands of participants. Many astronomy clubs have monthly star parties during the warmer months. Large regional star parties are held annually and are an important part of the hobby of amateur astronomy. A naturally dark site away from light pollution is typical.

Participants bring telescopes and binoculars of all types and sizes and spend the nights observing astronomical objects such as planets, comets, stars, and deep-sky objects together. Astrophotography and CCD imaging are also very popular. At larger star parties, lectures, swap meets, exhibitions of home-built telescopes, contests, tours, raffles, and other similar activities are common. Commercial vendors selling a variety of astronomical equipment may also be present. As with other hobbyist gatherings, much camaraderie and discussion of various aspects of the hobby occurs at any star party.

== History ==
The idea of a star party is not new and allegedly goes back at least as far as George III of the United Kingdom, who was passionately interested in astronomy and mathematics. On nights when poor weather blocked the view of the real stars and planets, attendants are said to have hung paper lanterns marked with drawings in the trees around the royal palace to provide something else for the King and his guests to spot through their telescopes.

== Public star parties ==
Star parties whose focus is on bringing the stars to the people are often staged in urban areas where people congregate in large numbers. This is in contrast to star parties typically held in remote dark-sky areas more conducive to stargazing.

In the US, notable star parties include the annual Winter Star Party, held in the Florida Keys; the Mid Atlantic Star Party, held on the east coast of the United States; the Oregon Star Party; the Stellafane Convention, held in Vermont; the Texas Star Party, held in west Texas; and the Okie-Tex Star Party, held near Kenton, Oklahoma. In Canada, Starfest, held near Ayton, Ontario, is organized by the North York Astronomical Association. In the United Kingdom, notable annual star parties include the Spring and Autumn Equinox star parties held at Kelling Heath Holiday Park and Kielder in Northumbria. In Australia, the South Pacific Star Party is held each year. In Sri Lanka, Star Party Sri Lanka is held annually at the University of Peradeniya premises.

== See also ==
- Bangalore Astronomical Society
- International Dark-Sky Association
- Khagol Mandal
- List of astronomical societies
- Messier marathon
- Sidewalk astronomy
- Star Party Sri Lanka
- StarPeace Project
