= Green Mountain Film Festival =

Film festival in Vermont

Coordinates: 44.257704°N 72.574600°W

- Location: Montpelier, Vermont, USA
- Founded: 1997
- Website: Green Mountain Film Festival

The Green Mountain Film Festival is an annual film event and awards show in Vermont. The first festival took place in Montpelier, Vermont, in 1997. In March 1999, a second festival was held and it has been an annual March event ever since. In 2010, the festival was extended to include a series of satellite screenings in St. Johnsbury, Vermont. In 2018, the festival also hosted screenings in Essex Junction, at the Essex Cinema. The 23rd Green Mountain Film Festival returned to Downtown Montpelier in March 2024 after a 4 year hiatus, with film screenings at both The Savoy Theater and The Capitol Theater in Montpelier, Vermont.

== Background ==
The program focuses on new work from around the world together with a few classic films. Around half the films shown are documentaries. There are also screenings of shorts and student films. Screenings are often followed by informal discussions often involving the filmmakers themselves. The festival also features special appearances by established film critics and filmmakers. Past guests have included critics Kenneth Turan, Molly Haskell, Phillip Lopate, David Thomson, Gerald Peary, and Matthew Hays. Filmmakers have included the screenwriter and director, Robin Swicord, actor/director Giancarlo Esposito, actor Michael Murphy, producer Christine Vachon, and documentary makers Albert Maysles, Les Blank and Ralph Arlyck.

The critic Stuart Klawans, writing in The Nation, described the 2003 Green Mountain Film Festival as "a cinephile's utopia: a festival organized and supported by an entire community of local moviegoers."

Every year hundreds of volunteers help run the festival and host special events at numerous venues across Montpelier, Vermont.

The 21st Green Mountain Film Festival was held between March 16 and March 25, 2018, and featured 82 feature films and 75 shorts, hand- on workshops, a “coming of age” film short course, and the first Vermont Filmmakers Summit. Then-current director Karen Dillon spoke about the 21st anniversary saying that she wanted the festival to “feel like a party for everyone”.

In 2020, due to the COVID-19 pandemic, the festival went into hiatus. The 23rd Green Mountain Film Festival returned to Downtown Montpelier, Vermont in March 2024 after a 4 year hiatus.

== History ==
=== Films in earlier festivals (2006) ===
- After Innocence
- After the Fog
- Ballets Russes
- The Boys of Baraka
- Campfire
- Commune
- Duma
- The Education of Shelby Knox
- Elevator to the Gallows
- Le Grand Voyage
- Hawaii, Oslo
- Homeland
- I Like Killing Flies
- Intimate Stories
- Isn't This a Time!
- Live and Become
- Living the Autism Maze
- The Lizard, or Marmoulak
- "Music and the Movies" with Lloyd Schwartz
- Midnight Movies
- Mind Games
- Paradise Now
- The Real Dirt on Farmer John
- The Red Wagon
- A Sidewalk Astronomer
- The Singers
- Sir! No Sir!
- The Syrian Bride
- Tony Takitani
- Touch the Sound
- The Warrior
- Winterwalk
- The World Outside

=== 10th Festival 2007 ===
The 10th Green Mountain Film Festival ran from 16 to 25 March 2007. Guests included Albert Maysles, Ralph Arlyck, Rob Mermin and Kenneth Turan. The films shown included

- Avenue Montaigne
- Beauty in Trouble
- Been Rich All My Life
- Black Gold
- El Carro
- The Cave of the Yellow Dog
- Climates
- C.R.A.Z.Y.
- Family Law
- Flock of Dodos
- Following Sean
- Gimme Shelter
- Gobi Women's Song
- Grey Gardens
- Gypsy Caravan
- Holding Our Own
- The Host
- Into Great Silence
- Jonestown: The Life and Death of Peoples Temple
- Land Mines: A Love Story
- The Light Ahead
- Living on the Fault Line
- Men at Work
- Meredith Holch: Homegrown Animation
- Molly's Way
- Our Daily Bread
- El Perro
- The Refugee All-Stars
- The Ritchie Boys
- The Rules of the Game
- Salesman
- Shakespeare behind Bars
- Sisters in Law
- Suite Habana
- Ten Canoes
- Today's Man
- Wondrous Oblivion

=== 11th Festival 2008 ===
The 11th Green Mountain Film Festival was held from 21 to 30 March 2008. Notable films shown included

- Blame it on Fidel
- China Blue
- Daratt
- Day for Night
- The Dhamma Brothers
- The Edge of Heaven
- Everything's Cool
- For the Bible Tells Me So
- Fraulein
- Honeydripper
- I'm Not There
- It's a Free World...
- Joe Strummer: The Future Is Unwritten
- King Corn
- Leonard Bernstein on Omnibus
- Mother of Mine
- Note by Note: The Making of Steinway L1037
- OSS 117: Cairo, Nest of Spies
- Protagonist
- The Seventh Seal
- The Visitor

=== 12th Festival 2009 ===
World Premiere - The Brother Who Sent His Sister to the Electric Chair (2009) World Premiere - Numen: The Nature of Plants

=== 13th Festival 2010 ===
The festival added a new venue at the Pavilion Auditorium, and also a three-day series of satellite screenings in Vermont's North East Kingdom.

World Premiere - The Summer of Walter Hacks (2010)

=== 14th Festival 2011 ===
The 14th Green Mountain Film Festival was held from March 18 to 27, 2011.

The festival inaugurated the Green Mountain 48-Hr Film Slam, a film-making competition, and announced the Margot George Short Film Competition, both initiatives aimed at fostering emerging film-making talent.

The 14th festival Guests included Phillip Lopate, David Amram, Roy Prendergast, and Jonathan Katz.

=== 15th Festival 2012 ===
The 15th Green Mountain Film Festival was held on March 16, 2012. Notable films shown included

- Being Elmo
- Boy
- Gen Silent
- How To Start a Revolution
- In Good Time: The Piano Jazz of Marian McPartland
- Lost Bohemia
- Pianomania
- Topp Twins: Untouchable Girls

=== 16th Festival 2013 ===
The 16th Green Mountain Film Festival was held from April 4 to April 12, 2013. Notable films shown included

- Childhood
- Northern Borders
- A Fierce Green Fire
- Bert Stern: Original Madman
- Beware of Mr. Baker
- Girl Model
- Kumare
- My Worst Nightmare
- Revolutionary Optimist
- Sightseers
- The Revisionaries
- The Savoy King
- The Thieves
- The Waiting Room
- 5 Broken Cameras

=== 17th Festival 2014 ===
Green Mountain Film Festival hired a new Executive Director, Rachelle Murphy. The festival was held from March 21-30, 2014. Notable films shown were;

- A Field in England
- Attic
- Béla Fleck: How to Write A Banjo Concerto
- Birth of the Living Dead
- Bread
- Computer Chess
- Elaine Stritch: Shoot Me
- Faust
- The Grand Seduction
- Night of the Living Dead
- Targets
