= Abram Shulsky =

American political scientist (born 1942)

Personal details
- Born: August 15, 1942 (age 83)
- Education: Cornell University (BA); University of Chicago (MA, PhD)

Abram Shulsky (born August 15, 1942) is a neoconservative scholar who has worked for the U.S. government, RAND Corporation, and the Hudson Institute. Shulsky served as Director of the Office of Special Plans, a unit whose function has been compared to the 1970s Team B exercise. In the run-up to the 2003 invasion of Iraq, Shulsky approved OSP memos with talking points about Iraq and weapons of mass destruction and terrorism. Shulsky is critical of the traditional intelligence analysis, which is based upon the social-scientific method, and of independent intelligence agencies. Shulsky favors a military intelligence model which can be used to support policy as, in Shulsky's words, "truth is not the goal" of intelligence operations, but "victory". Shulsky signed a letter to the Clinton White House on Iraq.

He worked for the George W. Bush administration in the "Office of Special Plans".

== Education and career ==
Shulsky received his B.A. in mathematics from Cornell University and his M.A. and Ph.D. degrees in political science from the University of Chicago. At Cornell and Chicago, he roomed with Paul Wolfowitz, whom he met during their time as members and residents of the Cornell Branch of the Telluride Association. Shulsky earned his doctorate under political philosopher Leo Strauss. He is a neoconservative scholar and Straussian.

Shulsky served as staff for the Senate Intelligence Committee in the early 1980s. He worked under Assistant Secretary of Defense Richard Perle during the Reagan Administration and later worked for the RAND Corporation. He worked as a consultant for the Office of Net Assessment, a Pentagon think-tank. In the run up to the 2003 invasion of Iraq, Shulsky was the Director of the Office of Special Plans (OSP), which served as a source of intelligence. He was hired and overseen by Douglas Feith and William Luti, but Shulsky's "real boss" may have been higher up than Feith. Deputy Secretary of Defense Paul Wolfowitz advocated the creation of the pro-war OSP as he "was impatient with the C.I.A." Gordon R. Mitchell, writing in the Quarterly Journal of Speech, stated,

Shulsky’s cell stovepiped dubious intelligence purchased from Ahmad Chalabi’s Iraqi National Congress to senior administration officials, fundamentally distorting policy-making on topics ranging from the threat of Saddam Hussein’s nuclear program to the cost of postwar reconstruction in Iraq.

After the OSP took control of providing "intelligence" to justify the invasion of Iraq, many veteran intelligence officers were forced into retirement or transferred to other positions despite years of service. Shulsky developed the "intelligence" received by the White House. According to Lt. Colonel Karen Kwiatkowski, Shulsky ran the OSP with a clear agenda, to support the efforts of his fellow neoconservatives. In his position at OSP, Shulsky "directed the writing of Iraq, WMD, and terrorism memos according to strictly supervised talking points" and granted them approval. Insider Karen Kwiatkowski characterized the talking points in depth:

These internal talking points seemed to be a mélange crafted from obvious past observation and intelligence bits and pieces of dubious origin. They were propagandistic in style, and all desk officers were ordered to use them verbatim in the preparation of any material prepared for higher-ups and people outside the Pentagon. The talking points included statements about Saddam Hussein's proclivity for using chemical weapons against his own citizens and neighbors, his existing relations with terrorists based on a member of al-Qaida reportedly receiving medical care in Baghdad, his widely publicized aid to the Palestinians, and general indications of an aggressive viability in Saddam Hussein's nuclear weapons program and his ongoing efforts to use them against his neighbors or give them to al-Qaida style groups. The talking points said he was threatening his neighbors and was a serious threat to the U.S., too... The talking points were a series of bulleted statements, written persuasively and in a convincing way, and superficially they seemed reasonable and rational. Saddam Hussein had gassed his neighbors, abused his people, and was continuing in that mode, becoming an imminently dangerous threat to his neighbors and to us—except that none of his neighbors or Israel felt this was the case. Saddam Hussein had harbored al-Qaida operatives and offered and probably provided them with training facilities—without mentioning that the suspected facilities were in the U.S./Kurdish-controlled part of Iraq. Saddam Hussein was pursuing and had WMD of the type that could be used by him, in conjunction with al-Qaida and other terrorists, to attack and damage American interests, Americans and America—except the intelligence didn't really say that. Saddam Hussein had not been seriously weakened by war and sanctions and weekly bombings over the past 12 years, and in fact was plotting to hurt America and support anti-American activities, in part through his carrying on with terrorists—although here the intelligence said the opposite. His support for the Palestinians and Arafat proved his terrorist connections, and basically, the time to act was now.

George Packer, Franklin Foer of The New Republic, and Mitchell all compare the OSP failures to the problems in the mid-1970s Team B competitive intelligence analysis, with Mitchell noting Shulsky "worked on the staff of the Senate Select Intelligence Committee that reviewed the original Team B exercise during the Cold War."

In 2006, Shulsky was working in the Pentagon at the Iran desk as "senior advisor to the undersecretary of defense for policy, focusing on the Mideast and terrorism." Mary Louise Kelly of NPR noted some concern from C.I.A. officials that he was in this position. Paul Krugman of The New York Times asked "Why would the Pentagon put someone who got everything wrong on Iraq in charge of intelligence on Iran?"

In 2010, Shulsky was working as a senior fellow at the Hudson Institute.

== Worldview ==
Shulsky, a Straussian, argues that Leo Strauss would have attacked the dominant method of U.S. intelligence analysis "known as the "social-scientific method," an approach advanced by Sherman Kent, a former Yale History professor and member of the WWII-era Office of Strategic Services (the predecessor to the C.I.A.)". Shulsky critiques the social-scientific method for its potential to err by mirror-imaging. In Silent Warfare Shulsky and Schmitt write, "social science can provide the facts ... but policy makers have a monopoly on choosing the values to be pursued".

Shulsky favors the military intelligence model, "in which the intelligence officer works for the commander rather than an independent intelligence agency". "He can scour the intelligence agencies for information his commander needs and represent the commander's priorities with respect to the collection and dissemination of intelligence", write Shulsky and Schmitt in Silent Warfare. Additionally, "In a supportive role, intelligence must concentrate its efforts on finding and analyzing information relevant to implementing the policy" as "truth is not the goal" of intelligence operations, but "victory". By contrast, in a paragraph discussing Shulsky's views, Dr. Michael Warner of C.I.A.'s History Staff states "the goal of intelligence is truth" but concurs with Shulsky's idea that secrecy is endemic to intelligence.

In a 1999 paper, "Leo Strauss and the World of Intelligence (By Which We Do Not Mean Nous)," also co-authored by Schmitt, Shulsky writes that "Strauss's view certainly alerts one to the possibility that political life may be closely linked to deception. Indeed, it suggests that deception is the norm in political life, and the hope, to say nothing of the expectation, of establishing a politics that can dispense with it is the exception."

== Publications ==
- The United States and Asia: Toward a New U.S. Strategy and Force Posture, Project Air Force Report with Zalmay Khalilzad and David T. Orletsky (RAND Corporation, 2001)
- Deterrence Theory and Chinese Behavior (RAND Corporation, 2000)
- Patterns in China's Use of Force: Evidence from History and Doctrinal Writings with Mark Burles (RAND Corporation, 2000)
- The US and a Rising China: Strategies and Military Implications with Zalmay M. Khalilzad, Daniel L. Byman, Roger Cliff, David T. Orletsky, David Shlapak, and Ashley J. Tellis (RAND Corporation, 1999)
- Leo Strauss and the World of Intelligence (By Which We Do Not Mean Nous), with Gary J. Schmitt in Leo Strauss, the Straussians, and the American Regime edited by Kenneth L. Deutsch and John Albert Murley (Rowman & Littlefield, 1999)
- The "Virtual Corporation" and Army Organization, with Francis Fukuyama (RAND Corporation, 1997)
- Preparing the U.S. Air Force for Military Operations Other Than War, with Vick Alan and John Stillion (RAND Corporation, 1997)
- Silent Warfare: Understanding the World of Intelligence, with Gary J. Schmitt (1991)
