= Starpeace (disambiguation) =

Starpeace is a 1985 concept album by Yoko Ono.

Starpeace may also refer to:

- StarPeace, a city-building computer game
- StarPeace Project, a global astronomy project
