= Atlantic Star (disambiguation) =

Atlantic Star or Atlantic Starr may refer to:

- Atlantic Star, a British & Commonwealth Second World War campaign medal
- Atlantic Star (cruise ship)
- Atlantic stargazer, a fish
- Atlantic Starr, a ca. 1980 US R&B band
- Atlantic Starr (album), the abovementioned band's first album, released in 1978

== See also ==
- Mid Atlantic Star Party
