= Tippy D'Auria =

American astronomer (1935–2018)

- Born: Matthew D'Auria; 1935
- Died: July 2018 (aged 82–83)
- Monuments: 11378 Dauria
- Occupation: Astrophotographer
- Employer: Miami-Dade College
- Organization: Southern Cross Astronomical Society

Matthew "Tippy" D'Auria (1935–2018) was the founder of the Winter Star Party held each year in the Florida Keys sponsored by the Southern Cross Astronomical Society.

D'Auria was an astrophotographer who used both cold camera photography and video for his work and taught Creative Photography and Darkroom Techniques for 5 years at the Miami-Dade College in Miami, Florida. He maintained affiliations with The Local Group of Deep Sky Observers, the Institute for Planetary Research Observatories (IPRO), Association of Lunar and Planetary Observers (A.L.P.O.), and the Astronomical League.

An active astronomer since 1980, D'Auria was of a member of the Southern Cross Astronomical Society and served as a member of the Societies Board of Fellows for 14 years and was a Vice President of that Society for many years as well.

Asteroid 11378 Dauria (1998 SV60) was named in honor of D'Auria. The citation reads: "Florida amateur astronomer Tippy D'Auria (b. 1935) is founder of the Winter Star Party. For many years he has worked to encourage both beginning and advanced sky-watchers in the hobby."

D'Auria was a frequent guest speaker and lectured on astronomy at universities, high schools, astronomy clubs, star parties and civic groups as well as at state and national parks.

D'Auria died in July 2018, of unspecified causes, surrounded by his family.
