= A Sidewalk Astronomer =

- Directed by: Jeffrey Jacobs
- Starring: John Lowry Dobson
- Cinematography: Jeffrey Jacobs
- Edited by: Jeanne Vitale
- Music by: John Angier
- Release date: April 19, 2005 (Singapore Film Festival)
- Running time: 79 minutes
- Country: United States
- Language: English

A Sidewalk Astronomer is a 2005 documentary film about a former Vedanta monk and amateur astronomer John Dobson. The film follows Dobson to state parks, astronomy clubs, and downtown streets as he promotes awareness of astronomy through his own personal style of sidewalk astronomy. The documentary includes voice overs by Dobson himself promoting his unorthodox views on religion and cosmology.

== Crews ==
- Produced and directed: Jeffrey Fox Jacobs
- Director of photography: Jeffrey Fox Jacobs
- Editor: Jeanne Vitale
- Music: John Angier
- Release: Jacobs Entertainment Inc
- Running time: 78 minutes

== Review ==
"An inspiring film about an inspired teacher".. New York Times

== Screenings ==
Shown at: Tribeca Film Festival 2005 ; Singapore Film Festival 2005; Maine Film Festival 2005; Avignon Film Festival 2005 ; Green Mountain Film Festival 2006
