= Mid Atlantic Star Party =

- Organization: Mid Atlantic Star Party (MASP)
- Location: Robbins, North Carolina
- Coordinates: 35.436609°N 79.550319°W
- Altitude: 472'
- Weather: Variable weather - clear dark night skies
- Established: October 1, 1995
- Website: Mid Atlantic Star Party

The Mid Atlantic Star Party (MASP) was an annual regional gathering of amateur astronomers (star party) held each fall around October near Robbins, North Carolina.

== History ==
The first annual regional gathering of amateur astronomers was held in 1995. MASP is located in one of the darkest spots along the eastern U.S. coast and is the largest annual gathering of amateur astronomers between Vermont's Stellafane and Florida's Winter Star Party.

The party went on hiatus in 2020 due to the pandemic.

== Modern times ==
With attendance usually numbering in the hundreds, MASP was held at the Occoneechee Council Boy Scout camp for the first decade of operation before scheduling conflicts forced a site change. The star party has become a focus of the town of Robbins' economic and cultural planning process and has spurred the creation of a regional "dark park" to control light pollution.

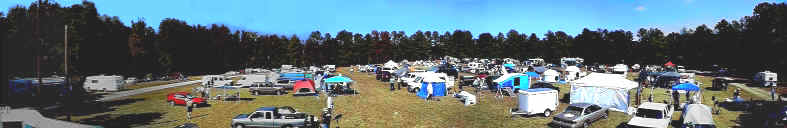
A panoramic view of the main observing field at the 2001 Mid Atlantic Star Party during the day.

== See also ==
- List of astronomical societies
