= StarPeace Project =

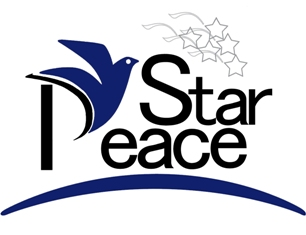
The official logo of the StarPeace Project.

The StarPeace Project was a global special project first organised in conjunction with the International Year of Astronomy in 2009. StarPeace project participants held public star parties near a border of their country with a neighboring country. The intention was to show that there are no borders in the real Earth, borders are man-made and science has no borders.

== Vision ==
In accordance with the goals of the International Year of Astronomy 2009, the Starpeace project has these aims:

- To encourage astronomy groups in one country to cooperate with those in neighboring countries, creating a network of active astronomy groups in that region.
- To give particular encouragement to the growth and survival of astronomy groups in developing countries.
- To use these star parties as a means of increasing scientific awareness and to improve the knowledge of astronomy through talks and photographs.
- To make a contribution towards regional peace and harmony.
- To provide an opportunity for people to use astronomical equipment that they might not otherwise have encountered or experienced at first hand.

== Organizers ==
StarPeace project is organized by Astronomical Society of Iran and the Sky Peace Organization, a non-governmental, not-for-profit organisation. StarPeace core team composed from Mohammad J. Torabi, Irene Shivaei, Kazem Kookaram, Hooman Najafi and Siavash Saffarian Pour who coordinate and guide StarPeace project with collaborate of their colleagues in more than 30 countries in the globe. The Astronomical Society of Iran is a non-beneficiary institute, established for the purpose of increasing and improving astronomical activities in Iran, both in research and in education. It seeks to facilitate cooperation and coordination between the scientific and technical centers of the country.

Anousheh Ansari is an advisor to the StarPeace project. She was the first woman from the Middle East to go into space, and the first Iranian. Ansari was the fourth self-funded space tourist and the first self-funded woman to fly to the International Space Station.

StarPeace has affiliated with Yuri's Night, named after the first human to go into space, Yuri Gagarin.

== Events ==
The StarPeace opening event of 2009 took place between Iran and the United Arab Emirates. On the first two nights of that year, Iranian astronomers held public star parties on Qeshm Island, south of Iran, and around 500 people enjoyed the beauty of the sky on those nights. A similar stargazing party attracted more than 150 people in Dubai.

A StarPeace event took place between India and Pakistan on February 9, during a penumbral lunar eclipse. An Indian astronomy group in Bhuj, India and a Pakistani astronomy group in Lahore, Pakistan held observing nights and astronomy speeches in SOS Children's Villages for young children.

In 2010, events were ongoing.

== See also ==
- International Year of Astronomy (IYA2009)
- Star party
- Sidewalk astronomy
- Yuri's Night
