= Karen Dillon (filmmaker) =

American filmmaker and arts educator

Karen Dillon is a filmmaker, educator, arts administrator and executive director of the Chandler Center for the Arts. Prior to coming to the Chandler, Dillon was the executive director of the Green Mountain Film Festival.

== Biography ==
Dillon was born in Ulysses, Kansas. She received a BFA from the School of Visual Arts in photography and film and her MFA in film writing, directing, and producing from Columbia University.

Dillon is also a film educator who has taught filmmaking and screenwriting at Columbia University, the Kansas City Art Institute, and Norwich University. She also lived in Abu Dhabi and worked at the Higher Colleges of Technology, Abu Dhabi Women's College, teaching media to Emirati women. She was a founding partner and editor of the magazine, Blue Sky, Green Earth, in Lawrence, Kansas.

She lived on a small farm in Berlin, Vermont, and raised dairy goats and grew Crocus sativus when she was there.

== Awards ==
Her film script, Birds with Teeth, won a screenwriting award from the Alfred P. Sloan Foundation.
