= Texas Star Party =

Major annual star party held in Texas, USA

Come for the skies, stay for the people
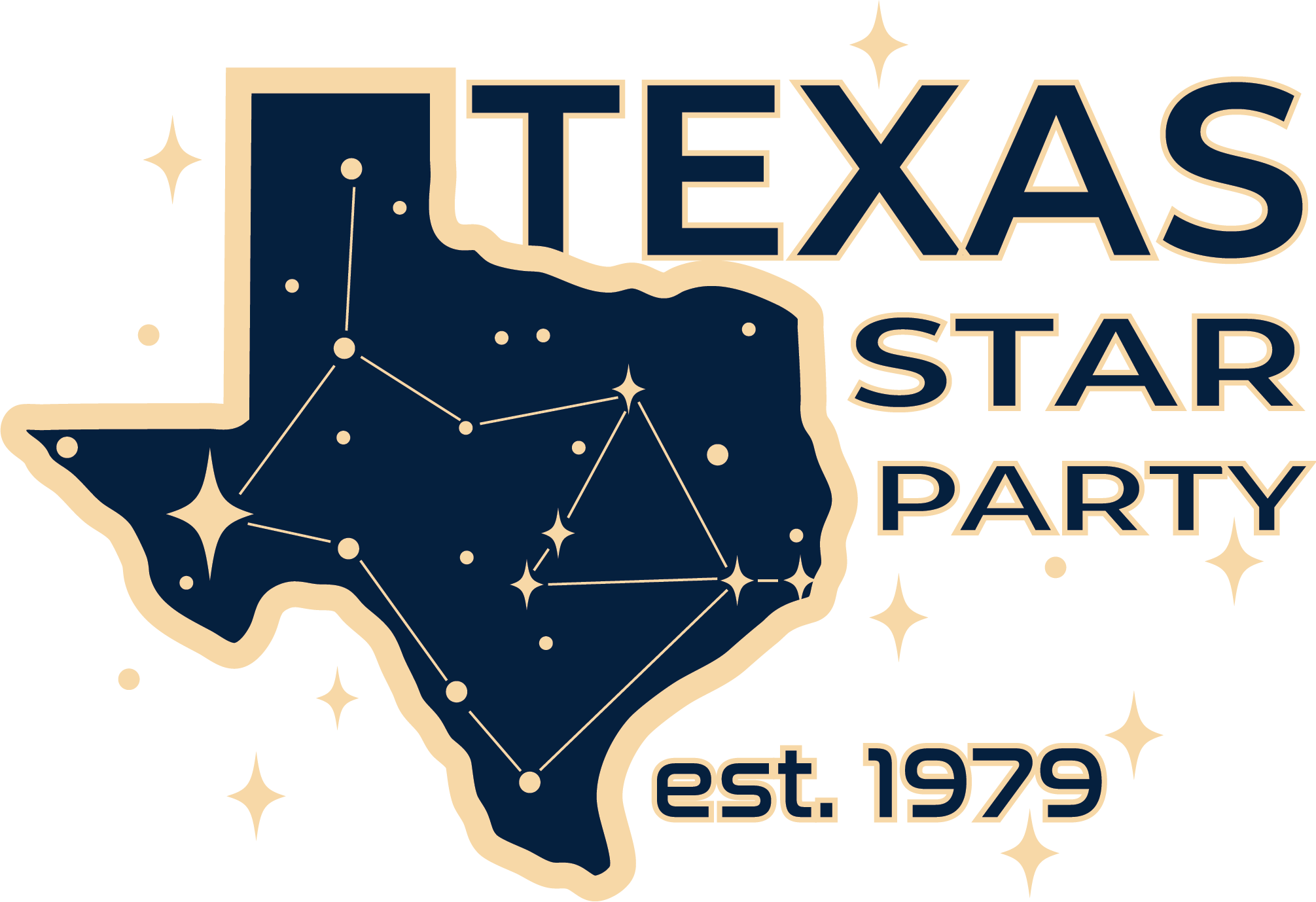
- Alternative names: TSP; TSP Star Party, West Texas Star Party
- Organization: Texas Star Party (TSP)
- Location: Prude Guest Ranch; Fort Davis, Texas
- Coordinates: 30.608381°N 103.950448°W
- Altitude: 5,049 ft (1,539 m)
- Weather: Summer - mild to hot, Winter - cool & crisp - clear dark night skies
- Established: August 1, 1979
- Website: Texas Star Party

The Texas Star Party (TSP) is a large annual star party held in the United States, typically taking place at the Prude Guest Ranch near Fort Davis, Texas. Founded in 1979, it is one of the oldest and largest gatherings of amateur astronomers in North America, drawing attendees from across the continent and overseas. The event is mainly organized by amateur astronomy groups with support from the University of Texas' McDonald Observatory, and is operated by Texas Star Party, Inc., a 501(c)(3) nonprofit organization.

Held each year in late April or May near the time of new moon, TSP offers a week of dark-sky observing under Bortle Class 2 skies at an elevation of approximately 5,040 feet, roughly 12 miles from the McDonald Observatory. Activities include visual observing and astrophotography, guest speakers, technical presentations, observing programs and challenges, an astrophotography contest, vendor displays, and tours of the McDonald Observatory. The event is run almost entirely by volunteers and traditionally presents two annual awards: the Lone Star Gazer Award and the Omega Centauri Award.

The 2027 Texas Star Party is scheduled for May 2–9, 2027, at the Prude Guest Ranch, roughly 12 miles from the McDonald Observatory.

== History ==
TSP was started by Deborah Byrd, members of the Austin Astronomical Society, and McDonald Observatory in August 1979. It was originally a weekend gathering of amateur astronomers at Davis Mountains State Park near McDonald Observatory in far west Texas.

In 1982, TSP was reorganized as a week-long event and was held at the Prude Guest Ranch near Fort Davis, Texas. TSP on the Prude Ranch was started by David Clark, George Ellis, and Don Garland, who were members of the Texas Astronomical Society of Dallas, Texas. The first TSP on the Prude Ranch was attended by over 450 amateur astronomers, making it one of the largest star parties in the U.S. For one year only, in 1997, the event was held at Alto Frio Baptist Encampment, on the banks of the Frio River, 40 miles north of Uvalde, Texas. Also in 1997, "Texas Star Party, Inc." was registered as a Texas Non-Profit Corporation. In 1998, TSP returned to Prude Ranch, where it continues to be held annually in late April or in May near the time of new moon. By 2007, the event attracted 580 attendees, even though the weather was very poor. Attendees mostly come from across North America, and some from far overseas.

While at TSP 1996, Brian A. Skiff named one of the asteroids that he had previously discovered. That asteroid, 4932 Texstapa (1984 EA_{1}), was discovered on March 9, 1984, and was named for the Texas Star Party on the occasion of its 18th anniversary in May 1996. The 42nd TSP was cancelled in 2020 caused by the COVID-19 pandemic. It was deferred to 2021.

In 2024, the Texas Star Party was relocated to Latham Springs Retreat and Camp Center near Aquila, Texas, in order to place attendees on the centerline of the April 8, 2024 total solar eclipse. Approximately 300 attendees observed 4 minutes and 23.5 seconds of totality, with solar prominences visible during the event. TSP returned to its traditional home at the Prude Guest Ranch for the 2025 event.

After the 2020 pandemic cancellation, a 2023 ranch fire that destroyed TSP's communications equipment, and a 2024 relocation to view the total solar eclipse, organizers have worked to return the Texas Star Party to its roots at Prude Ranch. Under the theme "Come for the skies, stay for the people," recent efforts have focused on rebuilding infrastructure, volunteer coordination, and the community traditions that have defined TSP since 1982.

== Activities ==
Activities include dark sky observing and imaging, an astrophotography contest, guest speakers, tours of McDonald Observatory, commercial vendors, and the opportunity to view numerous home built telescopes and gadgets. TSP is well known for its very dark skies due to its elevation in the Davis Mountains of around 5,000 feet (1,500 m) and it remoteness from artificial light sources. It has strongly supported efforts to reduce light pollution. Two annual awards have traditionally been presented at TSP: The Lone Star Gazer Award (for personal achievement, accomplishment, and expertise) and The Omega Centauri Award (for public awareness and/or promotion of astronomy). Complete lists of all past award winners as well as past guest speakers may be found on the TSP History page listed below. The TSP's observing fields at the Prude Ranch are the central field, the upper field, the upper-upper field, and the lower field. The TSP holds telescope programs of varying levels, binocular programs, a novice program, and an advanced observing program. The programs require the participant to observe a certain number of specified objects, and completion of a program will be awarded by a pin and in some cases another award. The binocular programs are usually a regular binocular program, an advanced binocular program, and a binocular program "from hell".

== Organization ==
The TSP is run by around 50-70 volunteers each year, drawn mostly from amateur astronomy clubs with support from the University of Texas’ McDonald Observatory.

== See also ==
- List of astronomical societies
