= William J. Luti =

American naval officer and government official

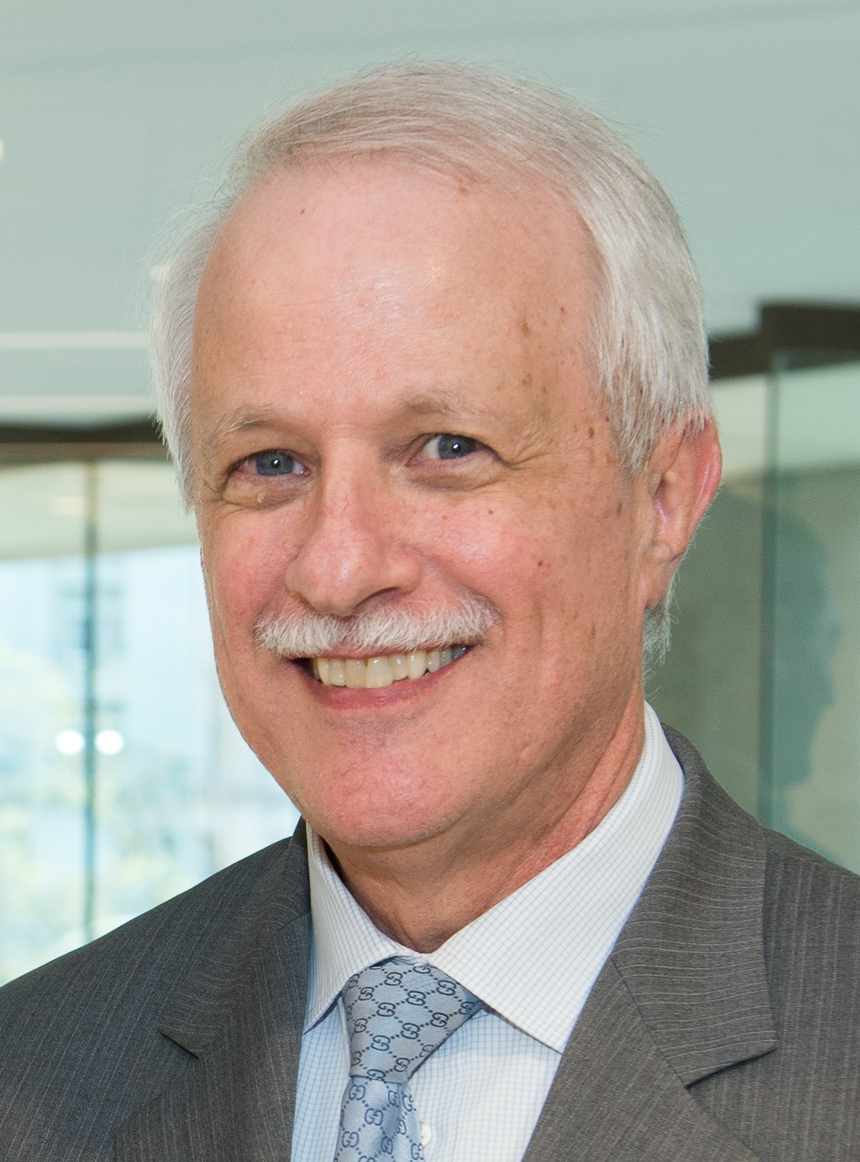
William J. Luti

William J. Luti served as Special Assistant to the President and Senior Director for Defense Policy and Strategy for the National Security Council in the administration of President George W. Bush.

Previously, Luti served as the Deputy Under Secretary of Defense for Near Eastern and South Asian Affairs from 2001 to 2005. While at the Defense Department he oversaw the Office of Special Plans. Prior to joining the Defense Department, Dr. Luti served as a Special Advisor for National Security Affairs to Vice President Cheney. He is a retired Captain in the U.S. Navy, having previously served for 26 years as a naval officer and naval aviator in a wide variety of operational and policy positions, including command of an aviation squadron, an amphibious assault ship, and an amphibious readiness group.

Luti received his bachelor's degree from The Citadel, a master's degree from the U.S. Naval War College, and a masters in law and diplomacy and a PhD in international relations from Tufts University's Fletcher School of Law and Diplomacy.

He is an adjunct fellow at the Hudson Institute, where he was previously a vice president.

== See also ==
Karen Kwiatkowski
