= MilitaryWeek.com =

MilitaryWeek.com (or MilitaryWeek) is an English-language, web-based, weekly anthology of global military affairs.

MilitaryWeek.com was founded and is published by LeRoy Woodson, a former staff-writer and editor with National Geographic magazine and The Washington Post. It was closed down in 2007 due to financial problems.

"We are living in times of unparalleled threat and hostility from unseen and often unknown enemies", Woodson states on the MilitaryWeek.com website; "The tendency of governments facing this situation is to turn inward, to sit on information as they try to formulate a strategy to meet this daunting challenge. It is the objective of the MW staff to harness the power of the internet — permitting global English-language media to speak with one, collective voice on just one topic: conflict. We pluck sometimes vital information from remote regions mired in conflict".

MilitaryWeek.com provides news links from the various global media, offering a variety of perspectives related to continuing conflicts, as well as to events that precede the outbreak of hostilities. The publication also cross-references news links with history links for a more complete background picture of any given crisis.

== Columnists ==
- Karen Kwiatkowski, retired U.S. Air Force officer, journalist
- Janine di Giovanni, foreign correspondent, author, journalist
- W. Thomas Smith, Jr., former U.S. Marine, author, journalist
