= Karen Kwiatkowski =

Retired military officer and author

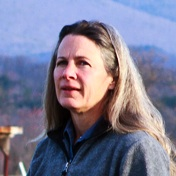
- Kwiatkowski on her family's Shenandoah County farm
- Born: Karen Unger; September 24, 1960 (age 66)
- Military career
- Allegiance: United States of America
- Branch: United States Air Force
- Service years: 1982–2003
- Rank: Lieutenant colonel
- Units: Near East/South Asia and Special Plans
- Awards: Sam Adams Award - Sam Adams Associates for Integrity in Intelligence Integrity Award
- Other work: A Case Study of the Implementation of the Reagan Doctrine.

Karen U. Kwiatkowski, née Unger, (born September 24, 1960) is an American activist and commentator. She is a retired U.S. Air Force Lieutenant Colonel whose assignments included duties as a Pentagon desk officer and a variety of roles for the National Security Agency. As of 2026, she is a member of Veteran Intelligence Professionals for Sanity.

Since retiring, she has become a noted critic of the United States government's involvement in Iraq. Kwiatkowski is primarily known for her insider essays which denounce a corrupting political influence on the course of military intelligence leading up to the invasion of Iraq in 2003. Her initial op-ed was published in the Akron Beacon.

In 2012, she challenged incumbent Bob Goodlatte, in the Republican primary for Virginia's 6th congressional district seat in the United States House of Representatives and garnered 34% of the Republican vote on a constitutional and limited government platform.

She received the Sam Adams Award in 2018.

While serving on the Air Staff, and in the Office of the Secretary of Defense, she wrote two books about U.S. policy towards Africa: African Crisis Response Initiative: Past Present and Future (US Army Peacekeeping Institute, 2000) and Expeditionary Air Operations in Africa: Challenges and Solutions (Air University Press, 2001).

She contributed to Ron Paul: A Life of Ideas, (Variant Press, 2008) and Why Liberty: Personal Journeys Toward Peace and Freedom, (Cobden Press, 2010).

She has been featured in a number of documentaries, including "Why We Fight" in 2005.

She has written for LewRockwell.com since 2003.

== Early life ==
Kwiatkowski grew up in western North Carolina. She holds advanced degrees from Harvard University and the University of Alaska, and a Ph.D. in world politics from The Catholic University of America. Her thesis was on The overt/covert war in Angola: a case study of the implementation of the Reagan doctrine.

== Career ==
=== Military ===
Kwiatkowski began her military career in 1982 as a Second Lieutenant. She served at Eielson Air Force Base in Alaska, providing logistical support to missions along the Chinese and Russian coasts. She also served in Spain and Italy.

Kwiatkowski was then assigned to the National Security Agency (NSA), eventually becoming a speechwriter for the agency's director. After leaving the NSA in 1998 she became an analyst on sub-Saharan Africa policy for the Pentagon. Kwiatkowski was in her office in the Pentagon when it was attacked on September 11, 2001.

From May 2002 to February 2003 she served in the Pentagon's Near East and South Asia directorate (NESA) as the North Africa Desk officer.

While at NESA, she wrote a series of anonymous articles, Insider Notes from the Pentagon which appeared on the website of David Hackworth. Kwiatkowski left NESA in February 2003 and retired from the Air Force the following month.

=== Writer and commentator ===
In April 2003 Kwiatkowski began writing a series of articles for the libertarian website LewRockwell.com. All her essays can be found here https://www.lewrockwell.com/author/karen-kwiatkowski/ In February 2004 for several years she wrote a biweekly column ("Without Reservations") for the website MilitaryWeek.com.

She is currently a Senior Fellow at the Eisenhower Media Network, a nonprofit group of former military, intelligence and civilian national security officials who described themselves as offering "alternative analyses untainted by Pentagon or defense industry ties" and countering "Washington’s establishment narrative on most national security issues of the day."

She has been critical of neoconservatism and has advocated for a non-interventionist foreign policy. Her writings on the subject of a corrupting influence of the Pentagon on intelligence analysis leading up to the Iraq War appeared in a series of articles in The American Conservative magazine in December 2003 and in a March 2004 article on Salon.com. The former is a three piece series which constitute the core of the story. https://www.theamericanconservative.com/in-rumsfelds-shop/ https://www.theamericanconservative.com/conscientious-objector/ https://www.theamericanconservative.com/open-door-policy/In the latter piece ("The New Pentagon Papers") she wrote:

I witnessed neoconservative agenda bearers within OSP usurp measured and carefully considered assessments, and through suppression and distortion of intelligence analysis promulgate what were in fact falsehoods to both Congress and the executive office of the president.

Kwiatkowski described how a clique of officers led by retired Navy Captain Bill Luti, assistant secretary of defense for NESA and former aide to Dick Cheney when the latter was Secretary of Defense, took control of military intelligence and how the "Office of Special Plans" (OSP) grew and eventually turned into a censorship and disinformation organism controlling the NESA.

Following the American Conservative and Salon articles, Kwiatkowski began to receive criticism from several conservative sources that supported President Bush's policies. Michael Rubin of the National Review argued she had exaggerated her knowledge of the OSP's workings and claimed she had ties to Lyndon LaRouche. Republican U.S. Senator Jon Kyl criticized her in a speech on the Senate floor. On a Fox News program, host John Gibson and former Republican National Committee communications director Clifford May described her as an anarchist. Kwiatkowski responded by saying, among other points, that she had never supported or dealt with LaRouche.

In addition to her writings Kwiatkowski has appeared as a commentator in the documentaries Hijacking Catastrophe, Honor Betrayed, Why We Fight and Superpower.

== Politics ==
Kwiatkowski was raised as a Goldwater Republican, and registered Republican from 1981 until 1994. She joined the U.S. Libertarian Party in 1994 and continued that membership until 2011. She was a speaker on military and foreign policy at the party's national convention in 2004. She returned to the Republican Party in 2011, and entered politics with the hope of joining Ron Paul, Justin Amash and others in the House Republican Liberty Caucus. She is endorsed by a past Chairman of the Republican Party of Virginia, as well as by a range of other fiscal and constitutional conservatives.

A number of Libertarian Party members and supporters have encouraged Kwiatkowski to seek the Party's presidential nomination in the past few election cycles. She has thus far declined to do so. On April 15, 2007, Kwiatkowski received the New Hampshire Libertarian Party's 2008 vice-presidential nomination, within a couple of weeks she declined the nomination. In 2007, she announced her support for Republican presidential candidate Ron Paul.

=== 2012 U.S. House of Representatives candidacy ===
In February 2011, a Federal Election Commission filing declared the Friends of Karen Kwiatkowski were drafting her to run for the Virginia's 6th district U.S. congressional seat in the 2012 election.

On August 18, 2011, Kwiatkowski formally announced her candidacy for the Republican nomination to challenge incumbent Republican U.S. Representative Bob Goodlatte in the June 12, 2012, primary election. She wrote a variety of opinion pieces geared directly to her 2012 House race, and was interviewed by both local and national media. Her campaign slogan was "Less Government, More Prosperity".

On June 12, 2012, Kwiatkowski lost the nomination bid to Goodlatte who won 66.48% of the vote in the Republican 6th district primary election.

== Personal life ==
Kwiatkowski lives with her family in Mount Jackson in the Shenandoah Valley of Virginia and is a farmer and part-time professor. She is married to Hap Kwiatkowski and has four children and seven grandchildren. She is a Christian.

== Founding member of the Veteran Intelligence Professionals for Sanity ==
Kwiatkowski is a founding member of the Veteran Intelligence Professionals for Sanity.

In September 2015 Kwiatkowski and 27 other members of VIPS steering group wrote a letter to the President challenging a recently published book, that claimed to rebut the report of the United States Senate Intelligence Committee on the Central Intelligence Agency's use of torture.

== Publications ==
=== Books ===
- Kwiatkowski, Karen (2000). African Crisis Response Initiative (ACRI) past, present, and future?. Peacekeeping Institute, Center for Strategic Leadership, U.S. Army War College.
- Kwiatkowski, Karen (2001). Expeditionary Air Operations in Africa: Challenges and Solutions. Air University Press. ISBN 978-1585661008.
- Griffin, David Ray; Peter Dale Scott (2006). 9/11 and American Empire: Intellectuals Speak Out, Vol. 1: Karen Kwiatkowski: Assessing the Official 9/11 Conspiracy Theory. Olive Branch Press. ISBN 978-1566566599.

=== Articles and essays ===
Most of Kwiatkowski's written work is available online.

== See also ==
- Oil Factor
- Hijacking Catastrophe
