= Winter Star Party =

Annual convention of amateur astronomers

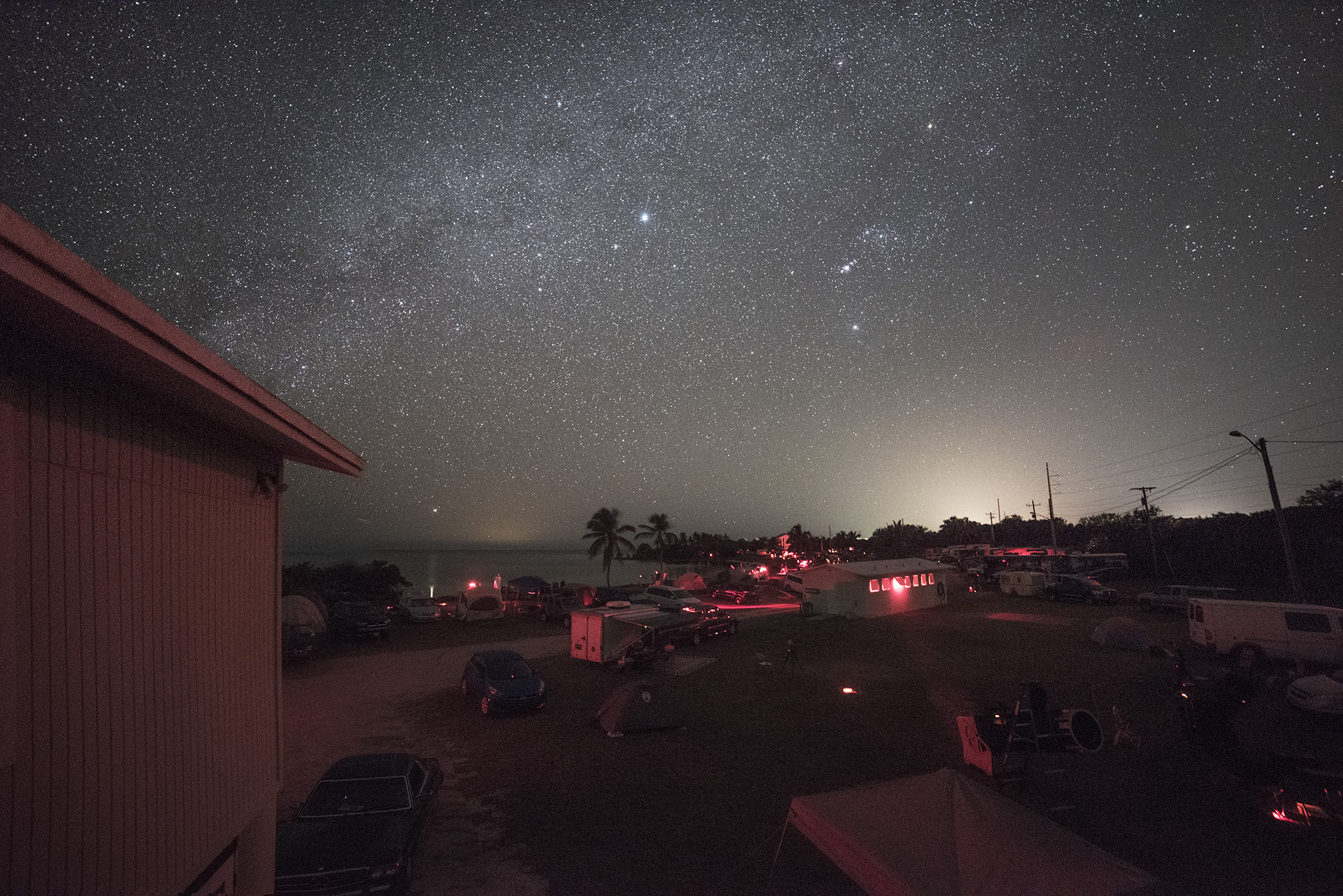
- Winter Star Party in 2017
- Alternative names: WSP
- Organization: Southern Cross Astronomical Society
- Location: Scout Key; Florida Keys
- Coordinates: 24.64994°N 81.310297°W
- Altitude: 6'
- Weather: Subtropical - clear dark night skies
- Established: February 1, 1984
- Website: www.scas.org/Home/WinterStarParty
- Related media on Commons

The Winter Star Party, aka WSP, is an annual convention of amateur astronomers where the primary activity is nighttime astronomical observation. This February event is run at Camp Wesumkee located on Scout Key in the Lower Florida Keys. It is hosted by the Southern Cross Astronomical Society of Miami, Florida.

Most attendees camp on site. BBC Sky at Night magazine rated WSP as one of the top 10 star parties in the world. WSP was first established in 1984 by Tippy D'Auria.

== See also ==
- List of astronomical societies
