= Iranian Directorate =

Intelligence unit of the Pentagon

The Iranian Directorate or Directorate for Iran is an intelligence unit of The Pentagon founded in 2006 involved with general information on Iran regarding diplomatic and military tensions between the United States and Iran. Opponents to the unit have criticised it for its similarities to the Office of Special Plans (OSP), which dealt with controversial intelligence reports in relation to Iraq, having been housed in an area that previously served the OSP, likewise with amongst those staffed three veteran officials of the OSP that share similar interests, according to a private investigator.

Lt. Col. Barry E. Venable, a Pentagon spokesman, confirmed the formation of the directorate for Iran in both a phone discussion and an email message; "As the State Department stated in early March (Daily Press Brief, Mar. 3), the U.S. Government is organizing itself better to address what Secretary Rice called 'one of the great challenges for the United States, a strategic challenge for the United States and for those who desire peace and freedom,' Venable wrote. 'As a counterpart to the State Department's new Office of Iran Affairs, the Department of Defense has split off a new directorate for Iran-related policy issues from the existing Directorate of Northern Gulf Affairs in the Office of Near East and South Asia Affairs (NESA), he additionally stated. These regional policy offices fall within the Office of the Assistant Secretary of Defense for International Security Affairs,' and thereafter under Eric Edelman. Edelman, Undersecretary of Defense for Policy.

== Membership ==
The acting director of the Iranian Directorate is not publicly known but has been reported to be military officer Ladan Archin. Some other members are former OSP director, Abram Shulsky, Project for the New American Century member Reuel Marc Gerecht, and Defense Intelligence Agency analyst, John Trigilio.

== Objective ==
The Los Angeles Times claimed that the aim of the Iranian Directorate in the Pentagon is to "undercut the government in Tehran" together with the Office of Iranian Affairs in the State Department.

In September 2006, the McClatchy Newspapers obtained a report drafted by the unit 'charging that U.S. international broadcasts into Iran aren't tough enough on the Islamic regime...It accuses the Voice of America's Persian TV service and Radio Farda, a U.S. government Persian-language broadcast, of taking a soft line toward Iranian President Mahmoud Ahmadinejad's regime and not giving adequate time to government critics.'

Initial responses hint that the unit holds strong directive and similarities with its OSP predecessor. According to the McClatchy Newspapers report, 'U.S. broadcasting officials and others who've read the report said it's riddled with errors..."The author of this report is as qualified to write a report on programming to Iran as I would be to write a report covering the operations of the 101st Airborne Division," Kenneth Y. Tomlinson, chairman of the Broadcasting Board of Governors, said in a statement on Tuesday.'

However, despite the issues arisen, the Pentagon has managed to obtain jurisdiction of VOA Persian and Radio Farda from the State Department.

== See also ==
- Stuxnet
- Iran–United States relations during the G.W. Bush administration
