= John Dobson (amateur astronomer) =

American amateur astronomer

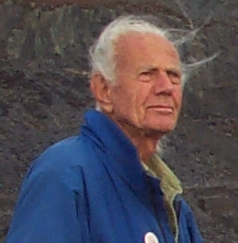
- Dobson in 2002
- Born: John Lowry Dobson; September 14, 1915; Beijing, China
- Died: January 15, 2014 (aged 98); Burbank, California, U.S.
- Education: U.C. Berkeley (M.S.)
- Occupations: Vedantan monk (1944−1967), lecturer / popularizer of amateur astronomy
- Known for: amateur telescope making, sidewalk astronomy, informal science education
- Notable work: Dobsonian telescope
- Movement: Sidewalk Astronomers
- Partner: Dr. Ruth Ballard (geneticist)
- Children: Loren Dobson
- Mother: Mabel Annetta Lowry (Dobson)

John Lowry Dobson (14 September 1915 – 15 January 2014) was an American amateur astronomer and is best known for the Dobsonian telescope, a portable, low-cost Newtonian reflector telescope. He was also known for his efforts to promote awareness of astronomy (and his unorthodox views of physical cosmology) through public lectures including his performances of "sidewalk astronomy". Dobson was also the co-founder of the amateur astronomical group, the San Francisco Sidewalk Astronomers.

== Biography ==
Dobson was born to Methodist missionary parents in China, but moved with his family back to the U.S. as a young child. He was a “belligerent atheist” as a young man. After earning a master's in chemistry, he encountered a teacher of a Vedanta monastic order, which seeks to integrate Veda-based religious precepts with rational inquiry, and joined the order, where he served as a Vedantan monk for 23 years. After leaving the order (in part because the time he surreptitiously dedicated to building telescopes did not meet the approval of the leader of the order's San Francisco monastery) he became an itinerant popularizer of amateur astronomy and sidewalk astronomy. In his later life, Dobson resumed regular association with a branch of the Vedanta order in southern California, but continued to dedicate most of his time to promoting public astronomy.

=== Early life and education ===
Dobson was born in Beijing, China. His maternal grandfather was the missionary Hiram Harrison Lowry, his mother was a musician, and his father taught zoology at a university. He and his parents moved to San Francisco, California in 1927. His father accepted a teaching position at Lowell High School and taught there until the 1950s. Dobson spent 23 years in a monastery, after which he became more active in promoting astronomy.

As a teen, Dobson became a "belligerent" atheist. He described his state of mind at that time:

"I could see that these two notions cannot arise in the same being: 'do unto others as you would that they do unto you' and 'if you're not a good boy, it's into hell for keeps.' ... They must be spoofing us. So I became an atheist – a belligerent atheist. If anybody started a conversation about the subject, I was a belligerent atheist."

Over time Dobson became interested in the universe and its workings. He earned a master's degree in chemistry at the University of California, Berkeley in 1943, working in E. O. Lawrence's lab.

=== Time at the monastery ===
In 1944 he attended a lecture by a Vedantan swami. Dobson said the swami “revealed to him a world he had never seen.” That same year Dobson joined the Vedanta Society monastery in San Francisco, becoming a monk of the Ramakrishna Order. “One of John's responsibilities at the monastery was to reconcile astronomy with the teachings of Vedanta. That job led him to build telescopes on the side. He took to wheeling them around outside the monastery, fascinating the neighbors who would congregate around him.”

Dobson's interest in telescope building was in part to better understand the universe, and in part to inspire in others a curiosity about the cosmos. To this end, he often offered assistance and corresponded about his work with those outside the monastery. Amateur telescope making was not part of the curriculum at the monastery, however, and much of his correspondence was written in code so as to attract less attention. For instance, a telescope was referred to as a "geranium", which is a type of flower. A "potted geranium" referred to a telescope in a tube and rocker, while a "geranium in bloom" referred to a telescope whose mirror was now aluminized.

Eventually Dobson was given the option of ceasing his telescope building or leaving the order. He chose to stop building telescopes so that he could remain at the monastery. But one day another monk wrongly accused him as missing and reported him to the head swami. Dobson was expelled in 1967. However, he maintains that the accusation was not the true reason for his expulsion. The true reason, he contends, was a result of a misunderstanding. The head swami read a paper that was presumed written by Dobson, that contradicted the reconciliation of science with Vedanta, and the swami thought Dobson had rejected the swami's teaching.

=== Amateur astronomy ===
Having left the order in 1967, Dobson in 1968 co-founded the San Francisco Sidewalk Astronomers, an amateur astronomy organization that aims to popularize astronomy among people on the street, along with Bruce Sams and Jeffery Roloff. Sams had built a large telescope but because at the time he was only age 12, he was not eligible for membership in the only local club – the San Francisco Amateur Astronomers – thus the “San Francisco Sidewalk Astronomers” was founded. It was also at this time that Dobson's simple form of telescope – which came to be known as the Dobsonian – became well known after he started teaching classes to the public on how to make your own telescope.

He was later asked to speak at the Vedanta Society of Southern California in Hollywood, and continued to spend two months there each year teaching telescope and cosmology classes. He spent two more months at his home in San Francisco, and spent most of the rest of each year traveling as an invited guest for astronomical societies, where he spoke about telescope building, sidewalk astronomy, and his views of cosmology and the scientific establishment.

=== Amateur cosmology ===
Dobson claimed the Big Bang model did not hold up to scrutiny, and instead advocated a non-standard cosmology; a “recycling” Steady State model of the universe, where matter in the universe is forever expanding outward, but matter also “recycles” over time via quantum tunneling. In an essay entitled, “Origins”, Dobson also argued that such a universe could allow for life to be ubiquitous and ever-present.

=== Honours ===
In 2004, the Crater Lake Institute presented Dobson with its Annual Award for Excellence in Public Service for pioneering sidewalk astronomy in the national parks and forests, “where curious minds and dark skies collide”.

In 2005, the Smithsonian magazine listed Dobson as among 35 individuals who have made a major difference during the lifetime of that periodical.

=== Death ===
Dobson died while in Providence / Saint Joseph Medical Center in Burbank, California on January 15, 2014. He was 98.

== Promotion of astronomy ==
=== The Dobsonian telescope ===
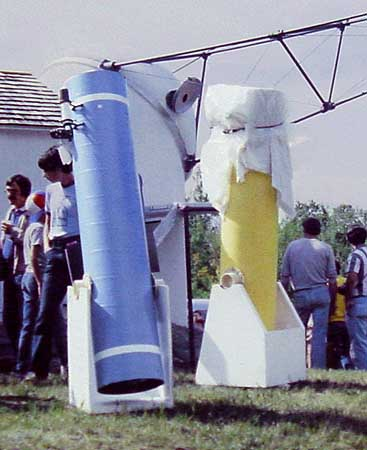
Two amateur-built Dobsonian style telescopes on display at Stellafane in the early 1980s

Dobson's most enduring legacy is the refinement and promotion of a design for a large, portable, low-cost reflecting telescope, now known as the "Dobsonian telescope". The design is a very simple, low cost alt-azimuth mounted Newtonian telescope that employs common materials such as plywood, Formica^{®}, PVC closet flanges, cardboard construction tubes, recycled porthole glass, and indoor-outdoor carpet. This type of simplified altazimuth mount has since been commonly referred to as a "Dobsonian mount" in amateur astronomical circles. Its construction method makes the typical Dobsonian telescope portable, inexpensive, very stable, and easy to manufacture, while revolutionizing the sheer size of telescopes available to amateur astronomers, with optical diameters unheard of before their appearance.

The design is named after Dobson because he is credited for being the first person to have combined all these construction techniques in a single telescope design. Dobson himself was reluctant to take credit, pointing out that he built it that way because it was all he needed. In his own words, he joked that he was "too retarded" to build a telescope with a more sophisticated equatorial telescope mount. With its simplicity of construction and use, the Dobsonian has become a very popular design today, particularly for large amateur telescopes. The Smithsonian National Air and Space Museum, in Washington, D.C., uses a Dobsonian telescope in the museum's public observatory, alongside other solar telescopes.

=== Sidewalk astronomers ===
Dobson co-founded the San Francisco Sidewalk Astronomers in coordination with two other people, having cheaply constructed several telescopes that were easy to use, including a 24-inch (610 mm) telescope that was built for approximately US$300. Rather than have regular meetings, the organization simply set up telescopes on the sidewalk during clear evenings, offering to show and explain the night sky to people passing by. The telescope which Dobson used most frequently on the streets of San Francisco, was a classic 9-inch aperture Dobsonian, with a typical porthole-glass mirror of outstanding optical quality, made by one of his own students in a mirror making class. This telescope was portable enough that it could be taken by Dobson from his residence to many busy street corners in San Francisco, using the city's Muni public transportation. Appropriately nicknamed "Tumbleweed", since it traveled randomly about to numerous public observing locations, this 9-inch telescope is now shared among many astronomy clubs and organizations around the world, allowing people everywhere to observe the heavens with such an iconic instrument, just as Dobson would have wished.

Unexpectedly, the Sidewalk Astronomers were invited to the 1969 Riverside Telescope Makers Conference (Riverside County, California). The 24-inch (610 mm) Dobsonian telescope brought by the Sidewalk Astronomers was unconventional, because most telescopes at such meetings tended to be smaller, on equatorial mounts, and designed for astrophotography rather than optical viewing. Surprisingly (and controversially at the time) Dobson's telescope tied in first prize for best optics. It was also awarded the runner up prize for mechanics, despite the mechanics of the telescope and its mount being exceptionally simple.

Sidewalk Astronomers has since become a prominent organization, recognized for its taking of astronomy to the public via "sidewalk astronomy". The current organization has members throughout the world, and continues to promote public service astronomy by putting telescopes on street corners in urban areas. Members of the organization also visit national parks giving slide show presentations, providing telescope viewing, and explaining the universe.

== Publications by John Dobson ==
Dobson's first ATM book was published with a unique plywood binding.

A 1991 book by Dobson & Sperling on telescope-making helped popularize what came to be known as the Dobsonian mount, and treats the why as being as important as the how. It covers Dobson's background and his philosophy on astronomy and the universe, and his belief in the importance of popular access to astronomy for proper appreciation of the universe. Dobson has also published two books on cosmology.

== John Dobson in the media ==
Dobson's life and ideas are the subject of the 2005 documentary A Sidewalk Astronomer. He was also featured in the PBS series The Astronomers, and appeared twice on The Tonight Show Starring Johnny Carson. Dobson also appears as one of the speakers in Universe: The Cosmology Quest, a documentary about non-standard cosmological theories.

== See also ==
- List of astronomical instrument makers
- 18024 Dobson
