= LeRoy Woodson =

American photojournalist

- Woodson in 1976
- Born: 1944; California, US
- Died: February 12, 2015 (aged 70); Paris, France
- Education: University of Wisconsin–Madison
- Occupations: Photojournalist author

LeRoy Woodson Jr. (1944 – February 12, 2015) was an American photojournalist. He was a staff writer and editor for National Geographic magazine in the 1970s and 1980s. He worked for many newspapers and magazines, including The Washington Post, LIFE, Fortune, and Forbes. Woodson was employed by the Environmental Protection Agency for their Documerica photography project. He has works in the collection of the Studio Museum in Harlem, wrote the book Roadside Food, and founded the website MilitaryWeek.com.

== Early life and education ==
LeRoy Woodson was born in California in 1944. He was the son of a United States Foreign Service officer and grew up in France where he was educated at École Pascal. After returning to the United States, he graduated from Florida A&M University High School in Tallahassee, Florida, in 1962. He earned a degree in French from the University of Wisconsin in Madison in 1966.

== Career ==
Based out of Washington, D.C., for much of his career, Woodson worked as a photographer and journalist. He was affiliated with Contact Press Images and the French photo agency Gamma. He worked for LIFE magazine, National Geographic, The Washington Post, Fortune, Forbes, Businessweek, and Geo magazine. He was a staff-writer and editor with National Geographic, working there from 1973 to 1982.

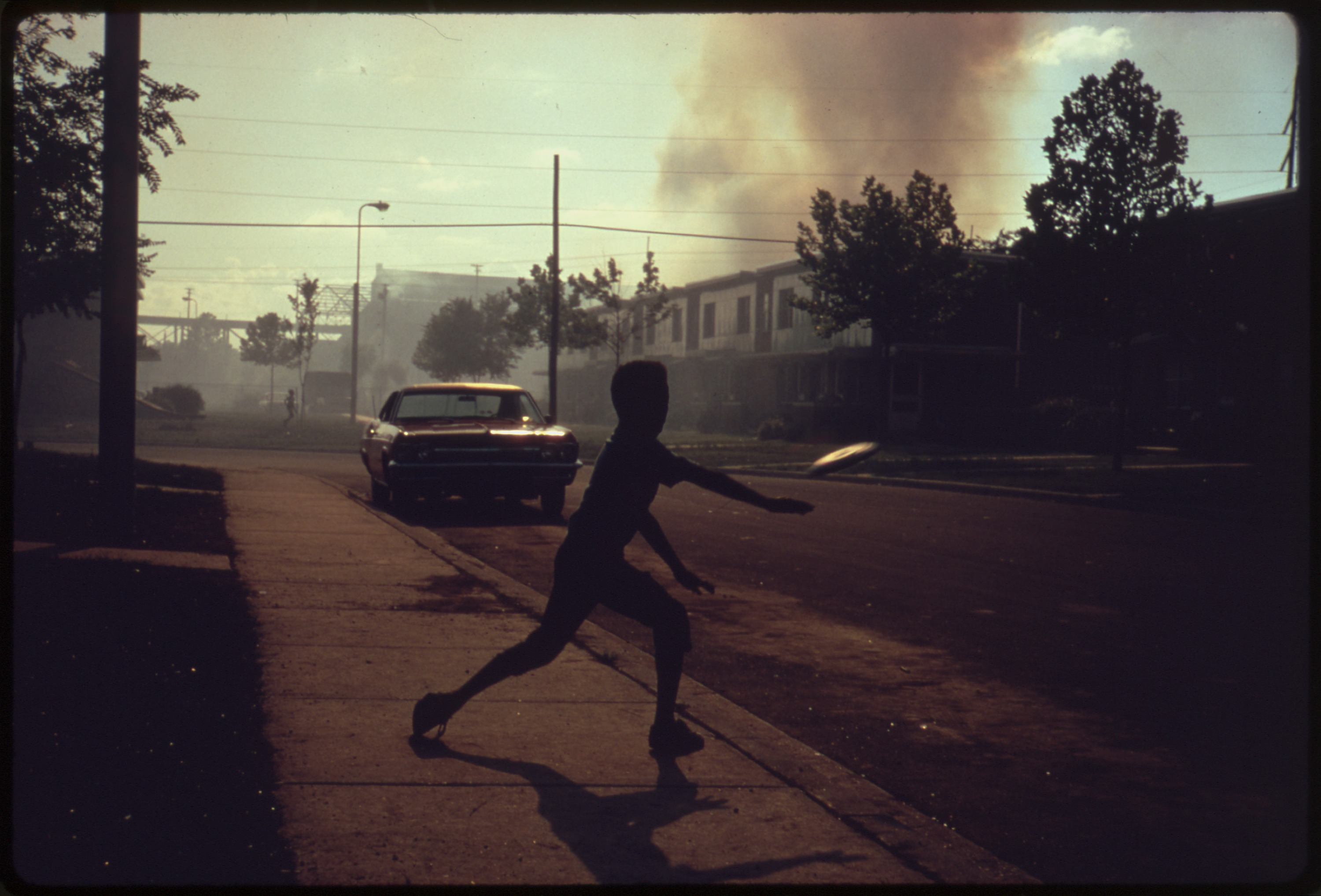
A photograph from Woodson's 1972 Birmingham series

Aside from his editorial work, Woodson was hired by corporations to photograph their employees, executives and facilities. He frequently traveled abroad for photojournalism assignments and by 1982 had visited forty countries. Woodson worked in Iraq and Iran. During a three-month stint in Zimbabwe he used 400 rolls of film covering a change in government. While his profession dictated the types of photography he created, he did not always agree with the publication's point of view.

Woodson took a series of photographs in 1972 documenting the impacts of industrial pollution on the lives of everyday people, focusing in part on people living in residential housing near North Birmingham, Alabama's U.S. Steel plant. The series was part of Documerica, a photography project of the Environmental Protection Agency. An image from the series was selected to be part of the 2013 exhibition Searching for the Seventies: The Documerica Photography Project.

Woodson wrote the 1986 book Roadside Food, which included photographs he had taken of roadside cafes in the United States over a yearlong period. The book has 100 photos and writings from various authors about New York hot dogs, American breakfasts, Cajun gumbo and donuts. In the book he describes his dislike of McDonald's and suggests that the optimal size for a hamburger is "somewhere around five ounces."

Subjects that Woodson captured during his career included Maine lobstermen and Nigeria's Argungu Fishing Festival. He also photographed celebrities such as fashion designer André Courrèges, Eddie Murphy for the cover of Life, and Susan Sarandon. His photograph of political adviser Thaddeus Garrett was used for the cover of Black Enterprise magazine in 1981. He shot an October 9, 1971, photo of John Lennon and Yoko Ono at her exhibition This Is Not Here at the Everson Museum of Art. The black and white portrait captures the couple through the prism of a water jug.

Woodson took part in the Footsteps of Champagne Charlie Challenge in 1992. The contest, named after Champagne merchant Charles Heidsieck, saw Woodson paired with photographer Ana Esperanza Nance in competition against five other teams in a race around the world without flying or using self-driven vehicles.

Woodson was the founder and editor of the website MilitaryWeek.com from 2003 to 2007. As a guest columnist for the Seattle Post-Intelligencer, Woodson wrote about Boeing in 2005.

Woodson joined Galerie VOZ’Image in 2009. His works are included in the collection of the Studio Museum in Harlem.

Woodson had heart disease and died in Paris at Pitié-Salpêtrière Hospital on February 12, 2015.

== Gallery ==
Woodson's photographs of Birmingham
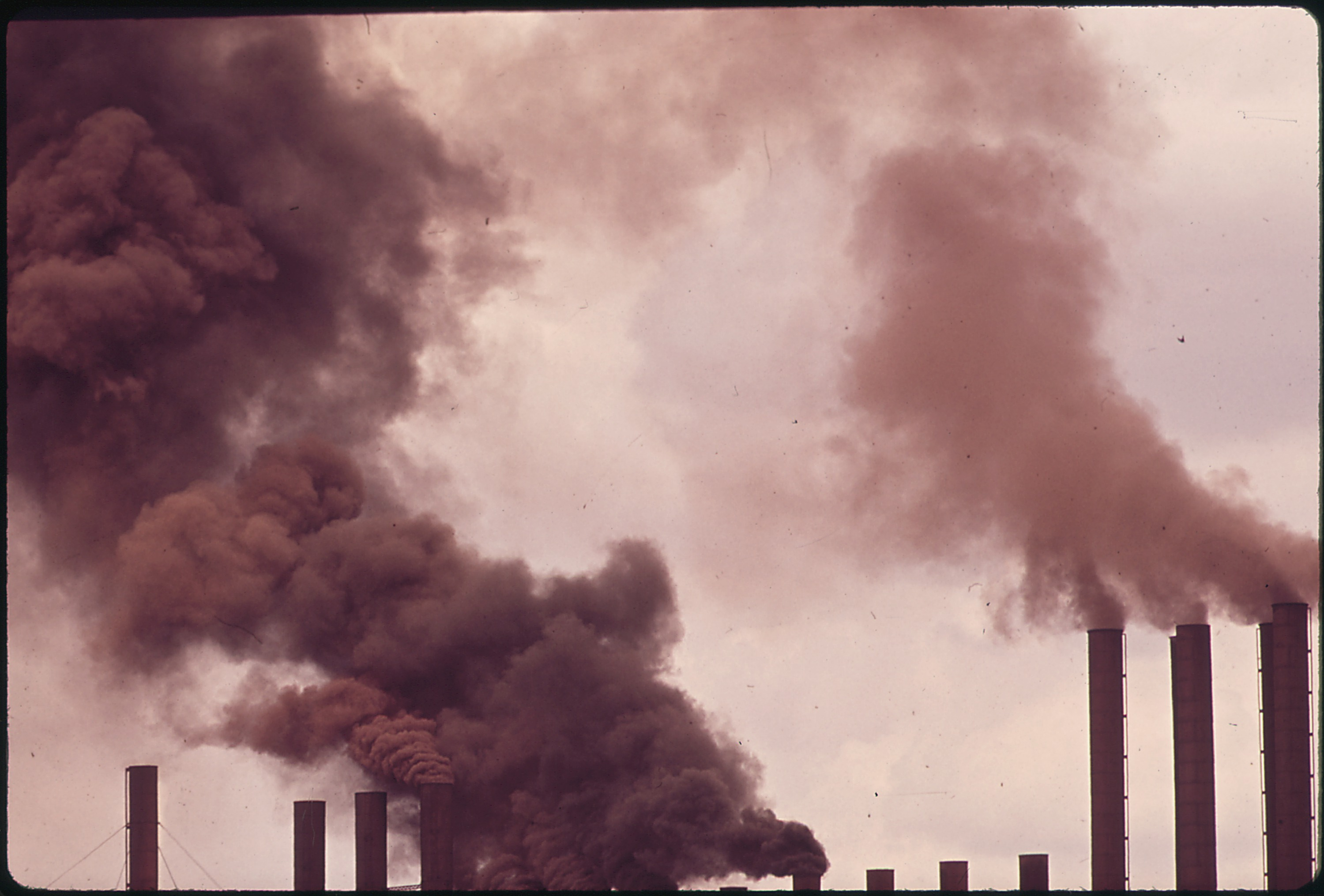
Smoke stacks from Birmingham's steel plants

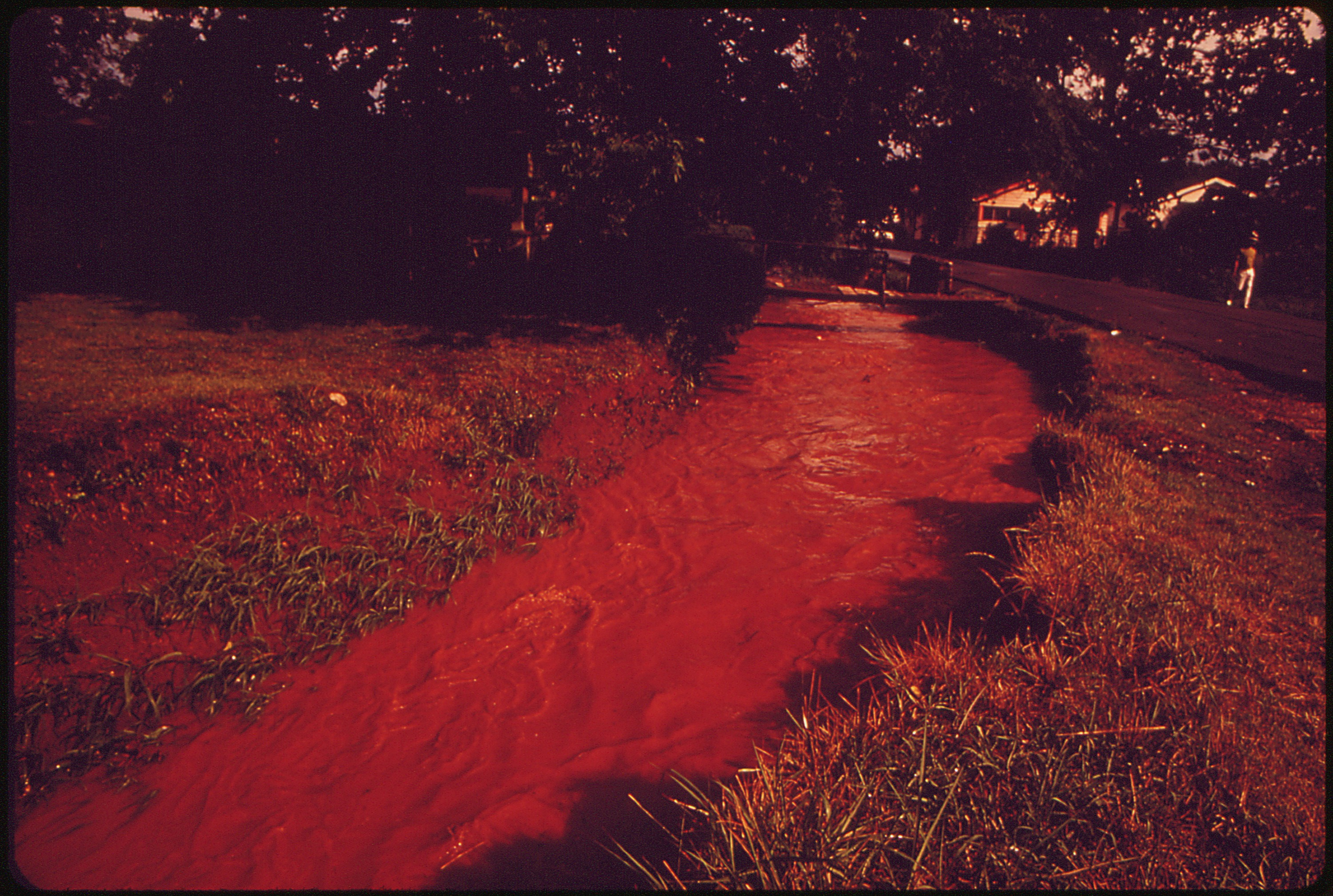
A stream showing the effect of steel industry pollution

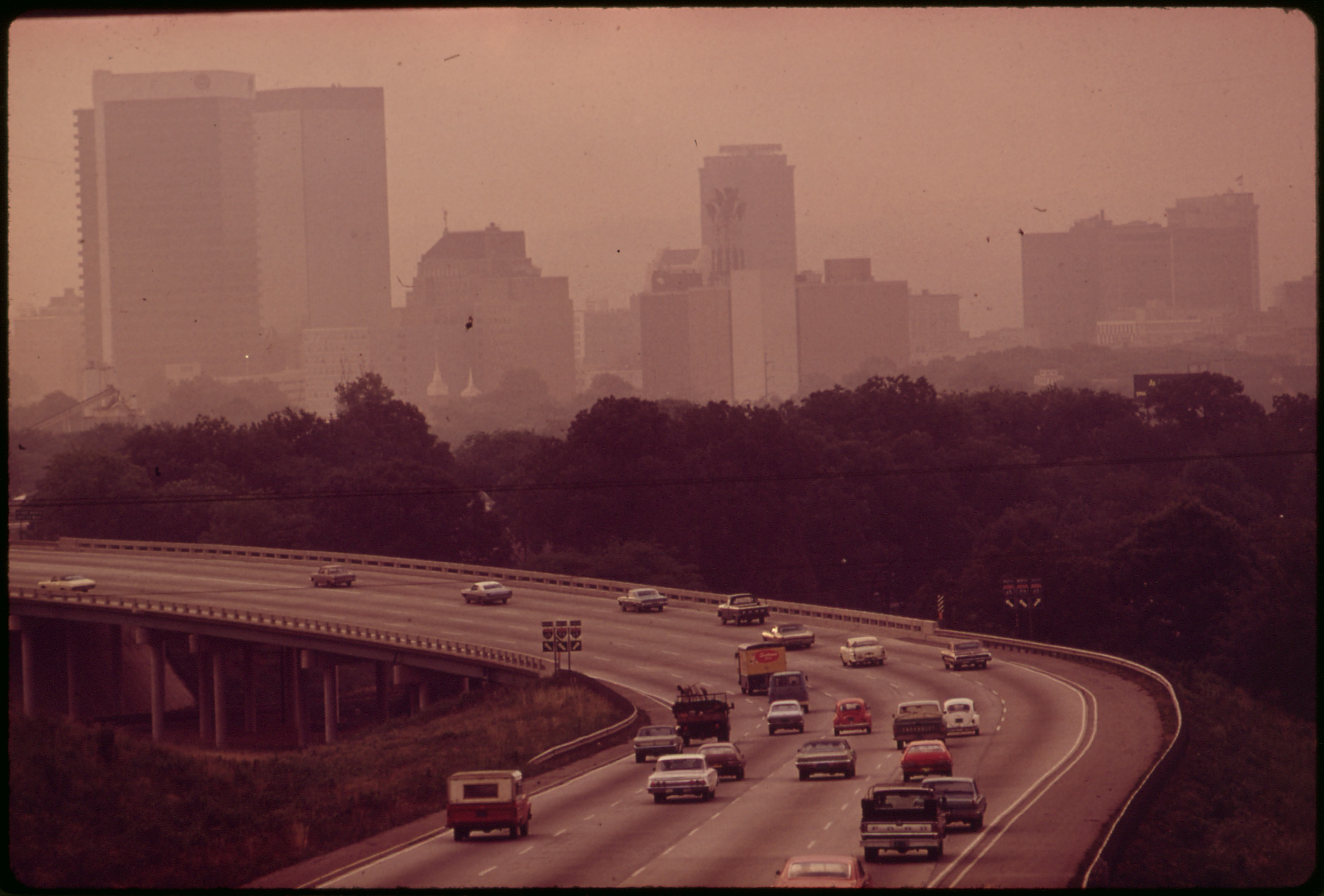
The smog-obscured skyline

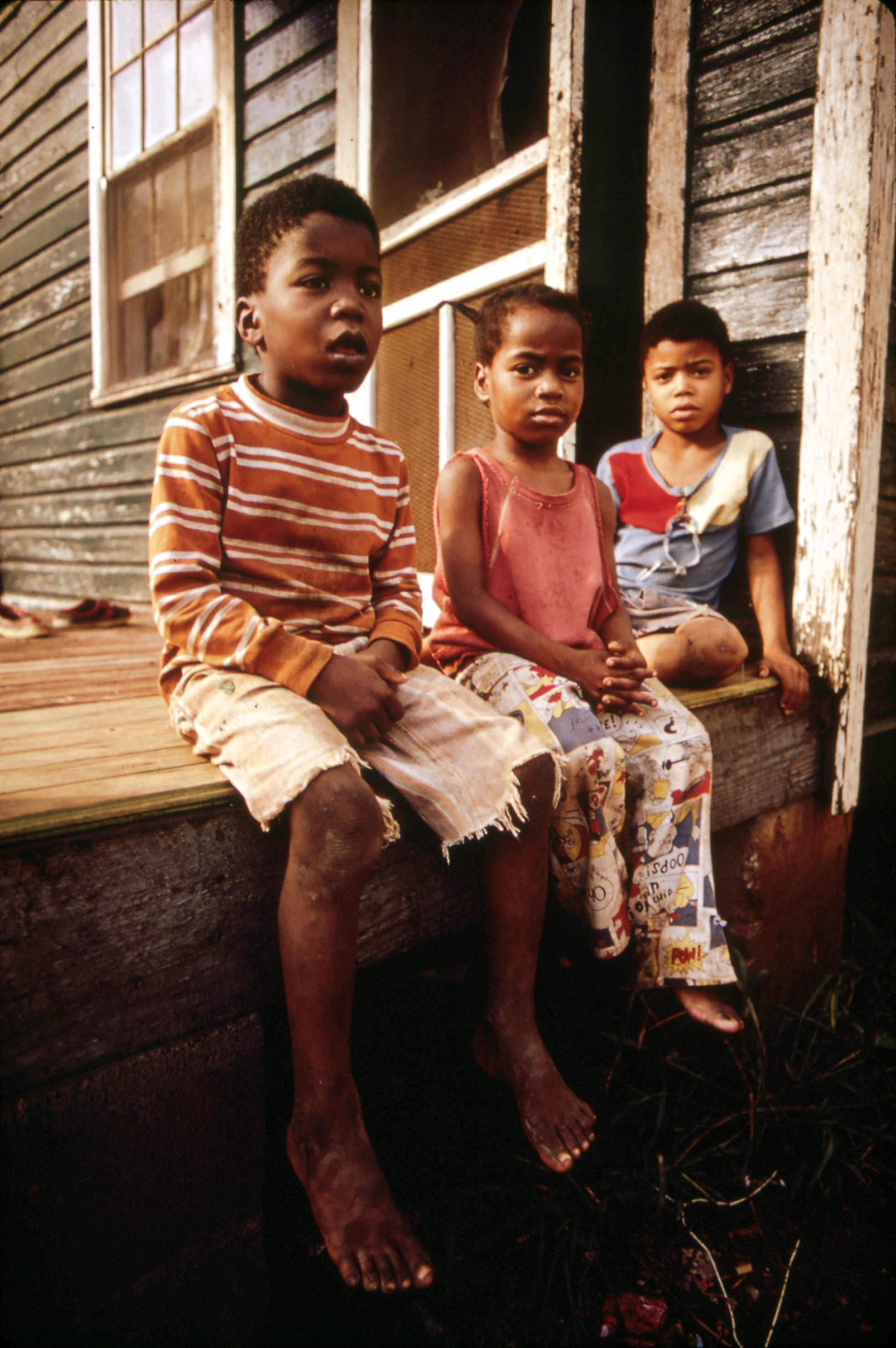
Children in South Birmingham's "Little Korea"

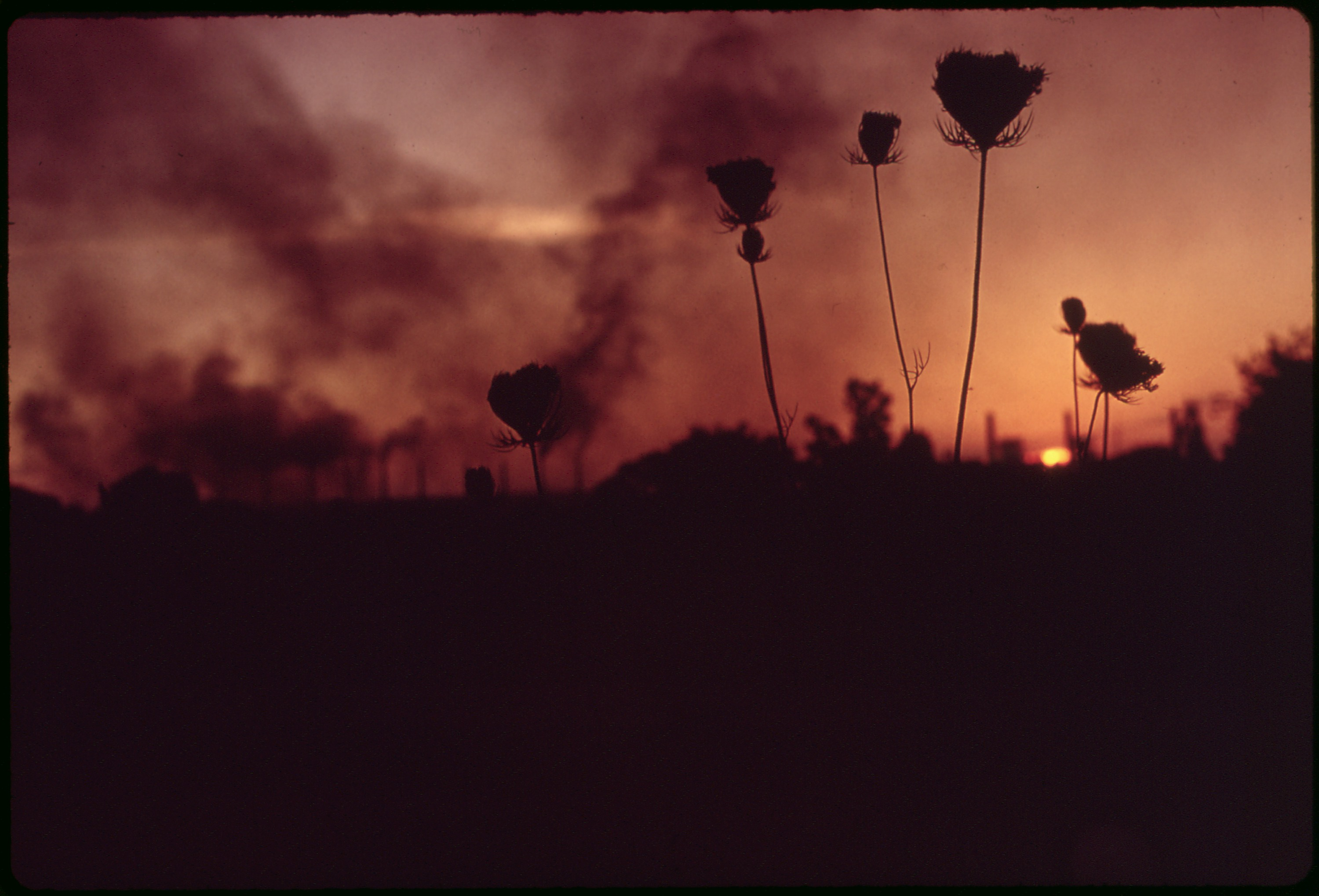
Smoke from continuously operating steel plants

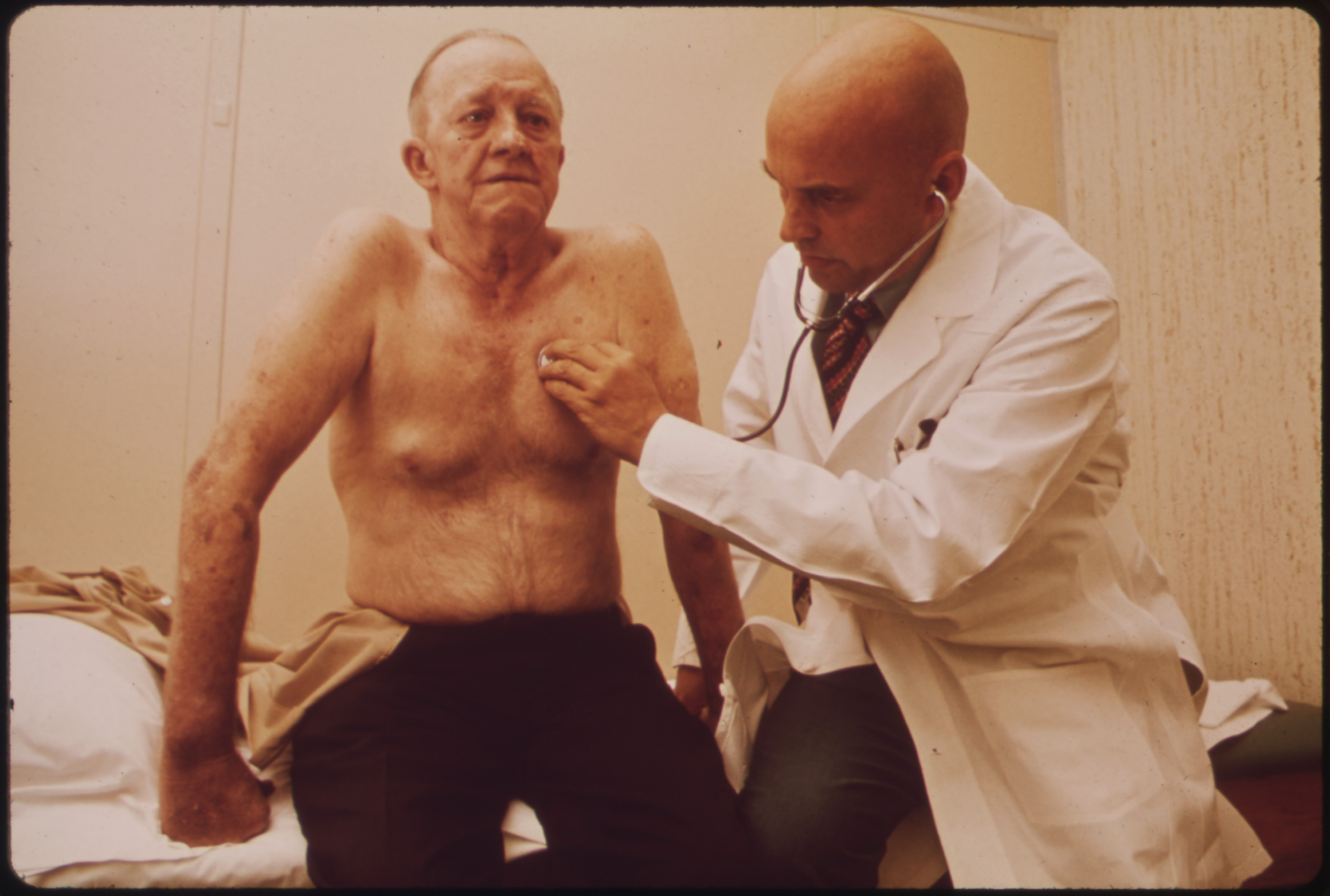
Examining a lung patient

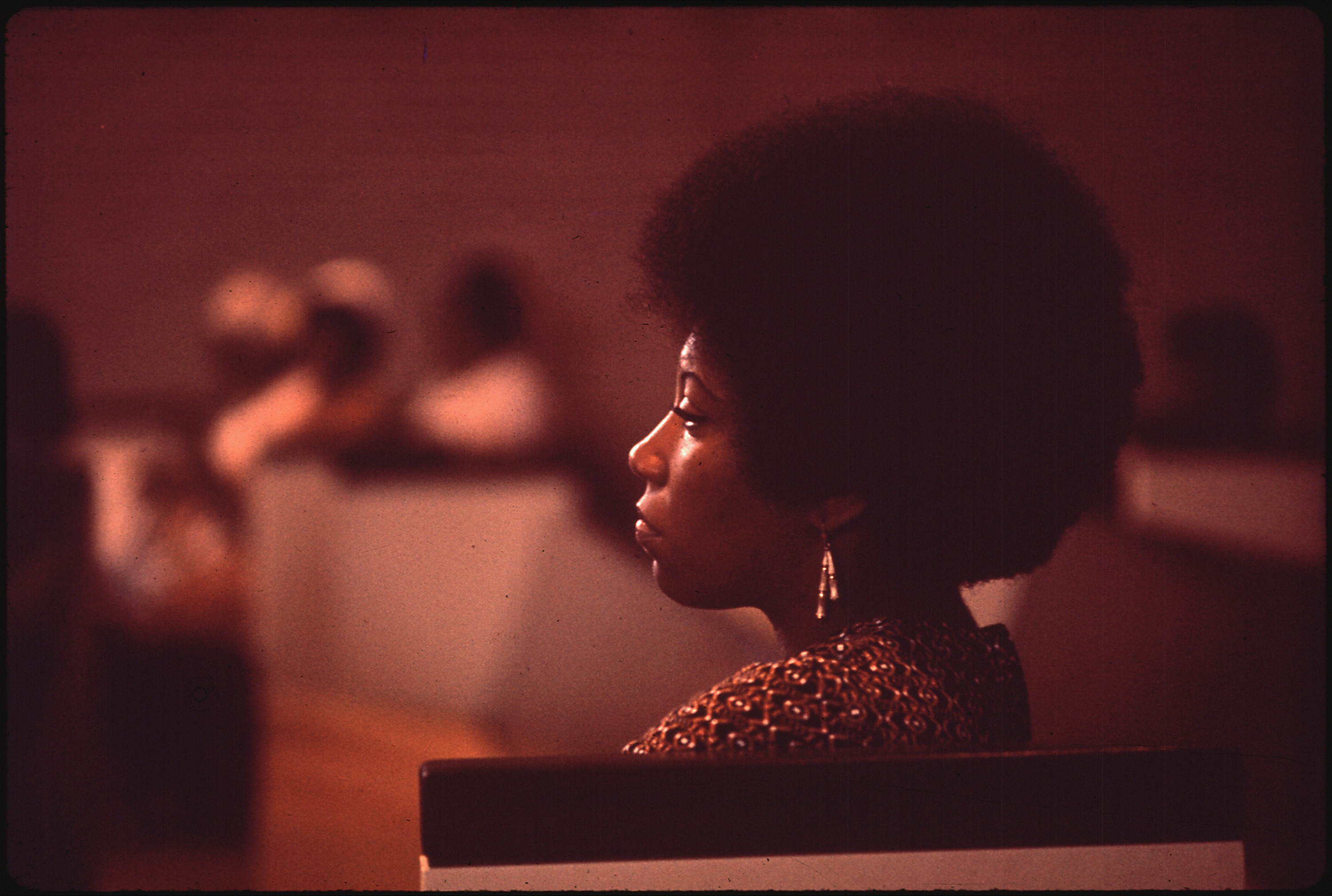
Woman attending services at Sixth Avenue Baptist Church in Birmingham
Photographs taken in the summer of 1972
