= Bangalore Astronomical Society =

Astronomical society in Bengaluru, India

The Bangalore Astronomical Society (BAS) is a society of amateur astronomers and other interested individuals, headquartered in Bangalore. The primary objective of the BAS is to promote and popularize Astronomy as a hobby and science.

== History ==
The society was founded in 2006 and registered as not-for-profit organization. In the initial days, members used to meet virtually over Orkut and then eventually they decided to form a not-for-profit organization.

BAS today is an informal volunteer-run group and is active through the BAS Google Group, a Telegram group, and through its star parties.

== Working Philosophy ==
Most of BAS Administrative tasks and its activities are handled by its volunteers. Volunteers hail from different walks of life, most being working professionals or students. BAS neither employs nor provides stipends for anybody involved in its activities or administration.

== Activities ==
BAS's activities broadly fall under Observing, Instrumentation, Outreach, Workshops and Meetings respectively. BAS Activities are normally open to one and all. BAS organizes, motivates and encourages its members to volunteer in Astronomy popularization and outreach initiatives. BAS Activities are normally announced and promoted solely on the web and sometimes with voluntary intervention from the media.

In light of the COVID-19 pandemic, BAS organized many virtual talks and webinars in year 2020 to help keep enthusiasts engaged during the lockdown phases. The talks were recorded and uploaded to the official YouTube Channel.

In September 2022, BAS joined hands with the Indian Institute of Astrophysics to organize a joint star party at the Hanle Dark Sky Reserve in the Himalayas. Over the recent years, BAS has organized many star parties, usually in the winter time and in the Western Ghats of Karnataka, owing to the dark skies the location offers.

== See also ==
- List of astronomical societies
