= Khagol Mandal =

Amateur astronomy organisation in Mumbai

Khagol Mandal is an organisation of amateur astronomers in Mumbai, India. Established in 1985 by a handful of astronomy enthusiasts, the organisation has grown into a membership of 1000+. The organisation was founded and is still based in Mumbai, Maharashtra, India.

The organisation was founded a year before the arrival of the Halley's comet and succeeded in its intent to generate curiosity among the general public about the comet.

The organisation previously had various geographical units located at Sion (head office), Dombivali, Nashik, Panvel and Pune. Now, the Sion and Nashik units remain functional. Each unit meets periodically (usually once a week) and conducts local astronomical programs and arranges lectures/slide-shows, etc. In addition each unit also runs its own library where members can avail of books on astronomy and related subjects. Each unit is assigned a head who reports to the central committee periodically. The unit-head prepares monthly accounts, conducts inventories and arranges for all administrative requirements of the members.

In addition to the above units, the Mandal (as it is affectionately called by its members) owns land at Vangani in Thane district of Maharashtra state of India. This place and other nearby places in the vicinity are used to conduct observation sessions for the general public as well as for members. Generally the programs are conducted on Saturday evenings/nights nearest to the New moon day. This allows the observers to view the faint deep-sky objects without interference from the moon-light. Approx 8-10 programs open to the public are conducted per year. The months of July, August and September are avoided which coincide with the Southwest Monsoon season in India.

The Mandal published two periodicals --- Khagol Warta in the local language Marathi (translated in English it means astro-news) and Vaishwik in English (which means Universal) for several years. While the Khagol Warta was published bi-monthly (six issues per year) the Vaishwik was published tri-monthly (four times per year).

== See also ==
- Amateur astronomy
- List of astronomical societies
- Star party
