= Ralph Arlyck =

American documentary filmmaker

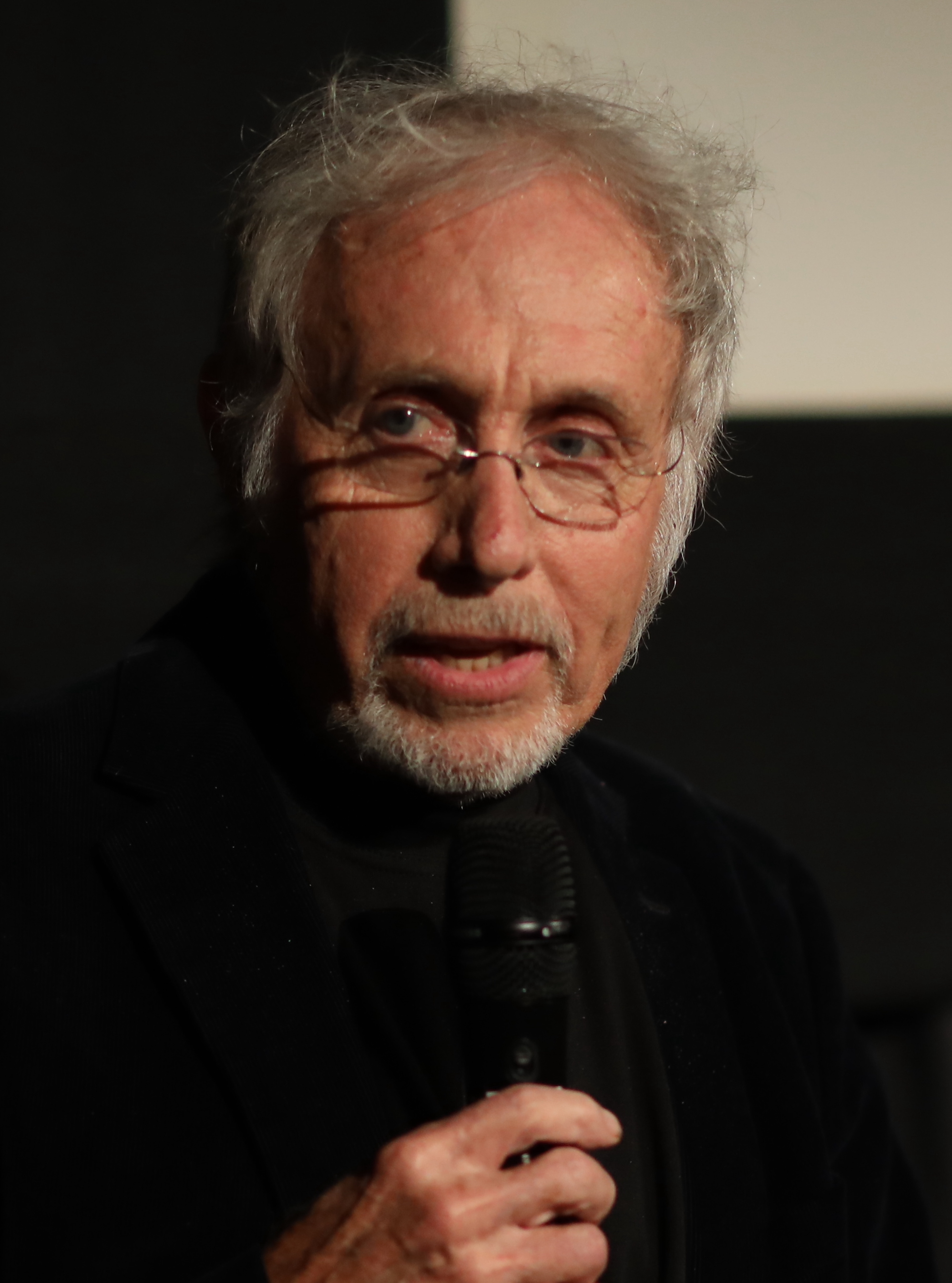
Arlyck in 2022

Ralph Arlyck (born December 17, 1940) is an American documentary filmmaker. He has won many awards, including Guggenheim and Rockefeller Foundation fellowships for his films and has shown at film festivals such as Sundance, New York, London, and Cannes.

== Career ==
An alumnus of Colgate University, his first major film was Sean, a short film which features the story of four-year-old Sean Farrell growing up in the Haight-Ashbury section of San Francisco in 1969. It received wide acclaim in the United States and Europe for its frank portrayal of the 1960s counterculture. Among its fans was French director François Truffaut, whose own film, The Wild Child, played alongside Sean at the Cannes Film Festival. Arlyck revisited Farrell in the 2005 follow-up documentary, Following Sean, which received similar praise at international film festivals.

Arlyck's other works include An Acquired Taste, Godzilla Meets Mona Lisa, and Current Events.

With I Like It Here, a 2024 documentary about aging wistfully in the Hudson Valley, Arlyck ads a voice-over narration that foregrounds his wry humor and tenderness even as the film reflects on mortality.

== Personal life ==
Arlyck lives in the Mid Hudson Valley with his wife, Elisabeth Cardonne Arlyck, a Professor Emerita of French, Vassar College. They have two grown sons.
