= Open Settlement Protocol =

Internet telephony protocol

The Open Settlement Protocol (OSP) is a client/server protocol used by Internet service providers to exchange authorization, accounting, and usage information to support IP telephony. Open Settlement Protocol is implemented in voice telephony gateways such as softswitches, H.323 multimedia conferencing gateways, and Session Initiation Protocol (SIP) proxies.

OSP is defined by the European Telecommunications Standards Institute (ETSI) Project TIPHON (Telecommunications and Internet Protocol Harmonization Over Networks).

A press release of September 2, 1998, announced that the industry leaders 3Com Corporation, Cisco, GRIC Communications, iPass Inc., and TransNexus had "teamed up to promote inter-domain authentication, authorization and accounting standards for IP telephony through the Open Settlement Protocol (OSP)". The Open Settlement Protocol is being developed under the authority of the European Telecommunications Standards Institute's ETSI project TIPHON. The TIPHON project objective is

"to support the market for voice communication and related voiceband communication (such as facsimile) between users . . . [to] ensure that users connected to IP based networks can communicate with users in Switched Circuit Networks (such as PSTN/ISDN and GSM), and vice versa."

One of the benefits of the new Open Settlement Protocol is: "flexible and feature-rich information exchange via the Extensible Markup Language (XML)". The message system defined in the protocol architecture uses HTTP to communicate the principal message content; this includes a MIME header together with the XML document in a <Message>.

Open Settlement Protocol standard specification may be found in the document ETSI Technical Specification 101 321: Telecommunications and Internet Protocol Harmonization Over Networks (TIPHON) Release 4: Open Settlement Protocol for Inter-domain pricing, authorisation, and usage exchange. Version 4.1.1 of this document was ratified in November 2003.

The document's statement of scope reads:

"This document specifies a set of protocols and associated profiles to permit the exchange of inter-domain pricing, authorisation, and settlement information between internet telephony operators. The protocols specified fulfil the essential requirements of such services, by providing appropriate functionality between multiple administrative domains in a secure manner. The specification also provides for non-standard extensions that permit co-operating parties to augment or replace the basic functionality."

Section 6 (XML Content)

"specifies the actual message format used by the OSP to exchange pricing, authentication and authorization, and usage information. It outlines the overall XML document structure, lists the individual XML elements, and describes how those elements are combined into exchanges."

XML element and attribute declarations in this section define the provisional DTD for the Open Settlement Protocol.

The OSP Toolkit is a complete development kit for software developers who want to implement the client side of the European Telecommunication Standards Institute's (ETSI) OSP standard for secure VoIP peering. The OSP Toolkit includes source code written in ANSI C, test tools and extensive documentation on how to implement the OSP standard. A hosted OSP test server is freely available on the Internet for all developers to test their OSP implementation.
