= Following Sean =

- Directed by: Ralph Arlyck
- Written by: Ralph Arlyck
- Produced by: Ralph Arlyck; Malcolm Pullinger
- Edited by: Malcolm Pullinger
- Music by: Éric Neveux
- Release date: 2005
- Country: United States
- Language: English

Following Sean is a 2005 documentary film directed by Ralph Arlyck, and a follow-up to his 1969 student short Sean, which features four-year-old Sean's thoughts on marijuana (including his own use), police presence, and freewheeling lifestyles. The film's notoriety landed a screening in the White House and a variety of predictions regarding the outcome of Sean's life - whether he could grow up to embody the hippy philosophy, or whether he would turn out a drug dealer or stock broker.

Following Sean picks up in the mid-1990s and turns Sean's story into a meditation on generational changes and legacies that are handed down as a result of choices made in heated political climates. The film was met with high critical praise, receiving an 86% "Fresh" rating on Rotten Tomatoes and a 64 on Metacritic.
