= Sidewalk astronomy =

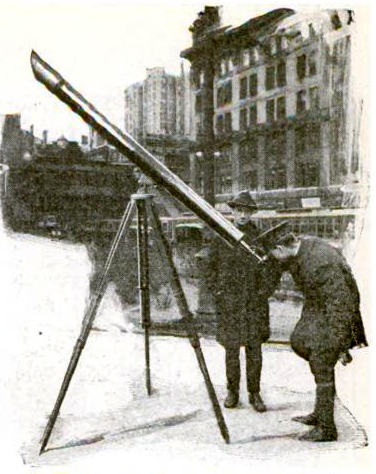
A "street corner astronomer" in New York City, 1921

Sidewalk astronomy or street corner astronomy refers to the activity of setting up a telescope in an urban place on a for-profit or non-profit basis as entertainment and/or for public education.

== Overview ==
Examples of people setting up telescopes on urban streets for public astronomical viewing go back well into the 19th century and maybe even further. Sidewalk astronomers and their telescopes have been a common sight in most big cities. There are many examples in the past such as Frank Manning in New Orleans as early as 1930 and Mr Grosser in Los Angeles in the 1870s, who not only set up a telescope but also an illuminated microscope. Some sidewalk "pitch men" charged the public to view astronomical objects through their telescope but other astronomers allow people to view for free. In more recent years sidewalk astronomy has come to be more associated with altruistic individuals or groups offering views of the nighttime sky as a free public educational service.

Because the sidewalks tend to be in light-polluted areas, sidewalk astronomers often coordinate their activities at times when brighter celestial objects like planets, the Moon, and bright stars are visible. During the day, sidewalk astronomy often includes the use of a solar filter on the telescope to allow people to view the Sun. Telescopes are often larger than the average available "department store telescope", sometimes very large.

== Amateur astronomical activities ==
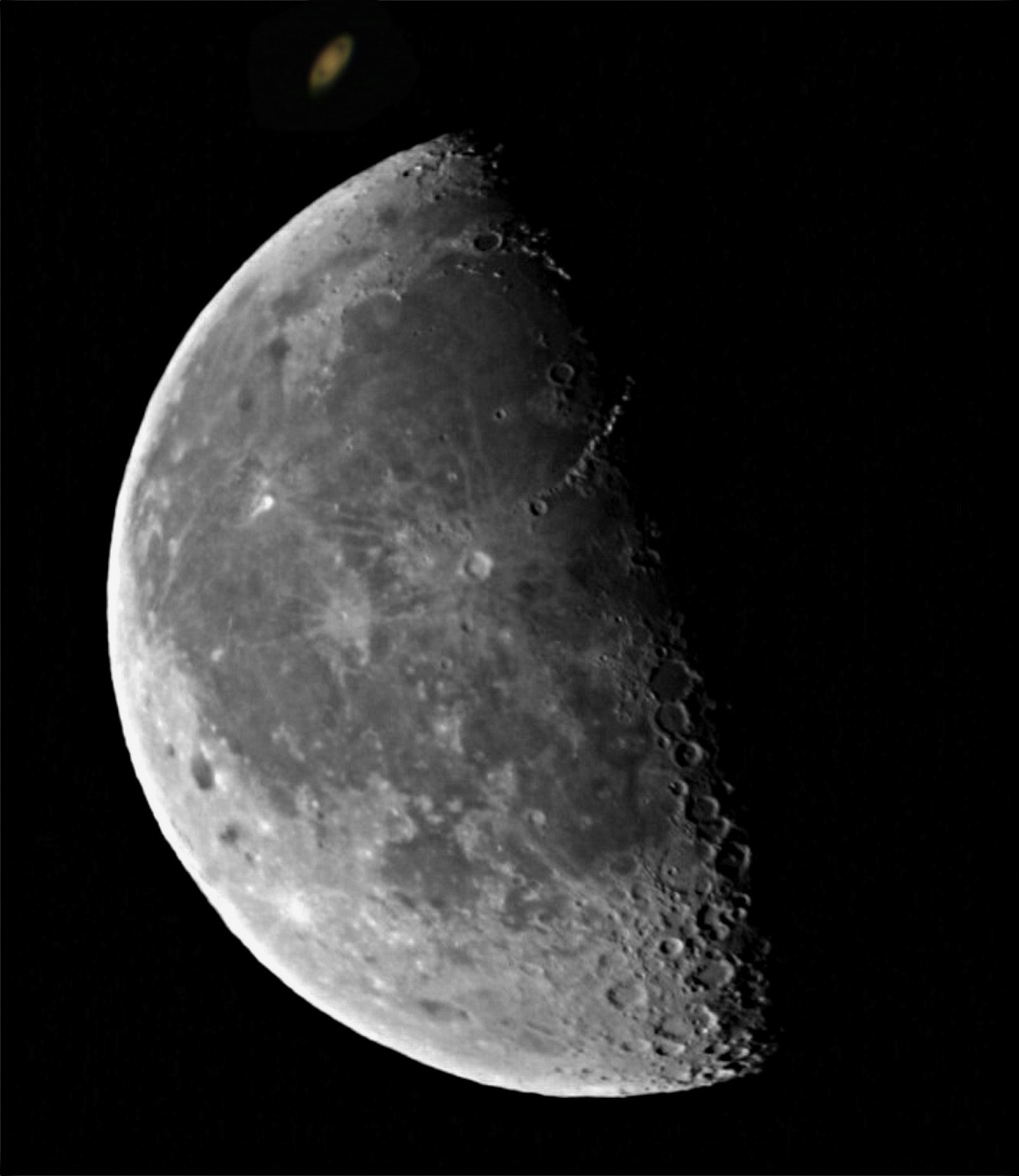
The Moon and Saturn are typical viewing targets in sidewalk astronomy.

With the advent and growth of organized amateur astronomical groups, sidewalk astronomy has come to be associated with public education about astronomy via free public viewing for anyone who wishes to look through the telescope. This usually involves individual or a group of amateur astronomers with small-to-medium-sized telescopes. Organizations such as the San Francisco Sidewalk Astronomers, founded by John Dobson, are organized around the idea of educating people about the universe they live in by having them look through telescopes. Dobson even promoted a design for large inexpensive reflecting telescope that he called a "Sidewalk Telescope", more commonly referred to as the Dobsonian telescope.

== See also ==
- Amateur astronomy
- Citizen science
- Star party
- A Sidewalk Astronomer, 2005 documentary about John Dobson's activities, including sidewalk astronomy
