= Deborah Byrd =

American science journalist (born 1951)

Deborah Byrd (born March 1, 1951, in San Antonio, Texas) is an American science journalist. She is editor-in-chief of EarthSky, which presents science news and night sky information. The website served more than 21 million users in 2019, according to Google Analytics.

== Early life ==
On March 1, 1951, Byrd was born in San Antonio, Texas. Her father was Kenneth Byrd, a long-time editor of the now-defunct newspaper, San Antonio Light. Her mother, Rosetta Schroeder Byrd, was a painter.

== Career ==
In 1976, Byrd, then working as a science journalist, founded the astronomy hot line that, in 1978, became the syndicated astronomy radio series StarDate. Byrd secured the National Science Foundation grants that made StarDate's national distribution possible. She produced StarDate, with host Joel Block, until 1991. StarDate continues, under the auspices of the University of Texas McDonald Observatory.

In 1979, Byrd founded the annual Texas Star Party in the Davis Mountains of West Texas. It remains a week-long astronomy festival, with hundreds of attendees yearly from around the world.

With Joel Block, Byrd created the internationally syndicated Earth & Sky radio series in 1991. She served as executive producer and cohost of the daily radio series until 2013, when the radio series ended (although the website continued). Earth & Sky was funded by grants from the National Science Foundation and other sponsors. Byrd wrote, produced and co-hosted – or oversaw the production of – more than 8,000 radio spots in 90-second, 60-second and 8-minute formats, with 13 million daily media impressions for astronomy in English on 1,800+ broadcast outlets, mostly U.S., but also Voice of America to Asia. During these years, Byrd also oversaw the production of video programming on science for YouTube, science programming for children, and audio and video programs in Spanish for Univision.

== Awards ==
Byrd has won numerous awards from the broadcasting and science communities, including having an asteroid named 3505 Byrd in her honor.

In 1984, Byrd was an early winner of the Klumpke-Roberts Award of the Astronomical Society of the Pacific.

In 2003, under Byrd's leadership, Earth & Sky became the first radio show ever to win a Public Service Award from the U.S. National Science Board "for its achievement in broadcasting explanations of research and everyday science to a worldwide audience".

In 2011, she won the Arts & Science Advocacy Award. Presented by Council of Colleges of Arts & Sciences (CCAS).

In 2020, Byrd was awarded the Education Prize from the American Astronomical Society, which recognizes outstanding contributions to the education of the public, students, and/or the next generation of professional astronomers. Byrd was recognized for her contributions to the Texas Star Party, the University of Texas McDonald Observatory's StarDate radio program and magazine, and the Earth & Sky radio program and website, "all of which epitomize her advocacy for science and her lifetime of service in educating and inspiring the public with the wonders and beauty of astronomy".
