= Earth & Sky =

Daily radio series

- Radio program logo
- Other names: EarthSky
- Running time: 60 and 90 second spots
- Country of origin: United States
- Languages: English, Spanish
- Syndicates: NPR
- Created by: Deborah Byrd, Joel Block
- Executive producer: Deborah Byrd
- Recording studio: Austin, Texas, USA
- Original release: 1991 – June 2, 2013
- Website: earthsky.org

Earth & Sky was a daily radio series that presented information about science and nature. It began broadcasting in 1991 and ceased operations in 2013. EarthSky is the ongoing website, serving 21 million users in 2019, according to Google Analytics.

== History ==
Earth & Sky was the creation of producers Deborah Byrd and Joel Block, who were also the hosts. Byrd had previously created the radio program Star Date that began broadcasting in the US in 1978, and Block was Star Date's original host.

Several producers researched topics, interviewed scientists and wrote radio scripts for the program through the years, including Jorge Salazar and Marc Airhart.

The final episode of Earth & Sky was broadcast on June 2, 2013. President and co-founder Deborah Byrd said that although funding options existed to continue the radio program, a decision was made to stop producing the radio show in order to concentrate on the EarthSky.org website and social media.

== Content ==
Earth & Sky presented 60- and 90-second radio spots (called "modules") on a wide variety of scientific topics, communicating through terrestrial radio as well as satellite radio and internet radio. Earth & Sky was aired one or more times daily on more than 1,000 commercial, NPR, and other public radio stations, 80 affiliate stations for the sight-impaired, and across 35 channels on both XM and Sirius satellite radio in the United States. Abroad, the programming was heard on American Forces Radio, Voice of America Radio, World Radio Network, and others.

The information on Earth & Sky came directly from scientists. The journalists who produced the Earth & Sky radio program spoke to several scientists each day, dozens each week and hundreds each year. More than 500 scientists had joined Earth & Sky as volunteer advisers. Earth & Sky science advisers suggested content, gave feedback, recommended other experts, and reviewed scripts for accuracy before they were recorded for broadcast.

Earth & Sky featured many fields of science. In 2006, it focused on nanotechnology, women in science, observing the Earth, astrophysics and space, and the human world.
