= Star Party Sri Lanka =

Star Party Sri Lanka තරු සාදය
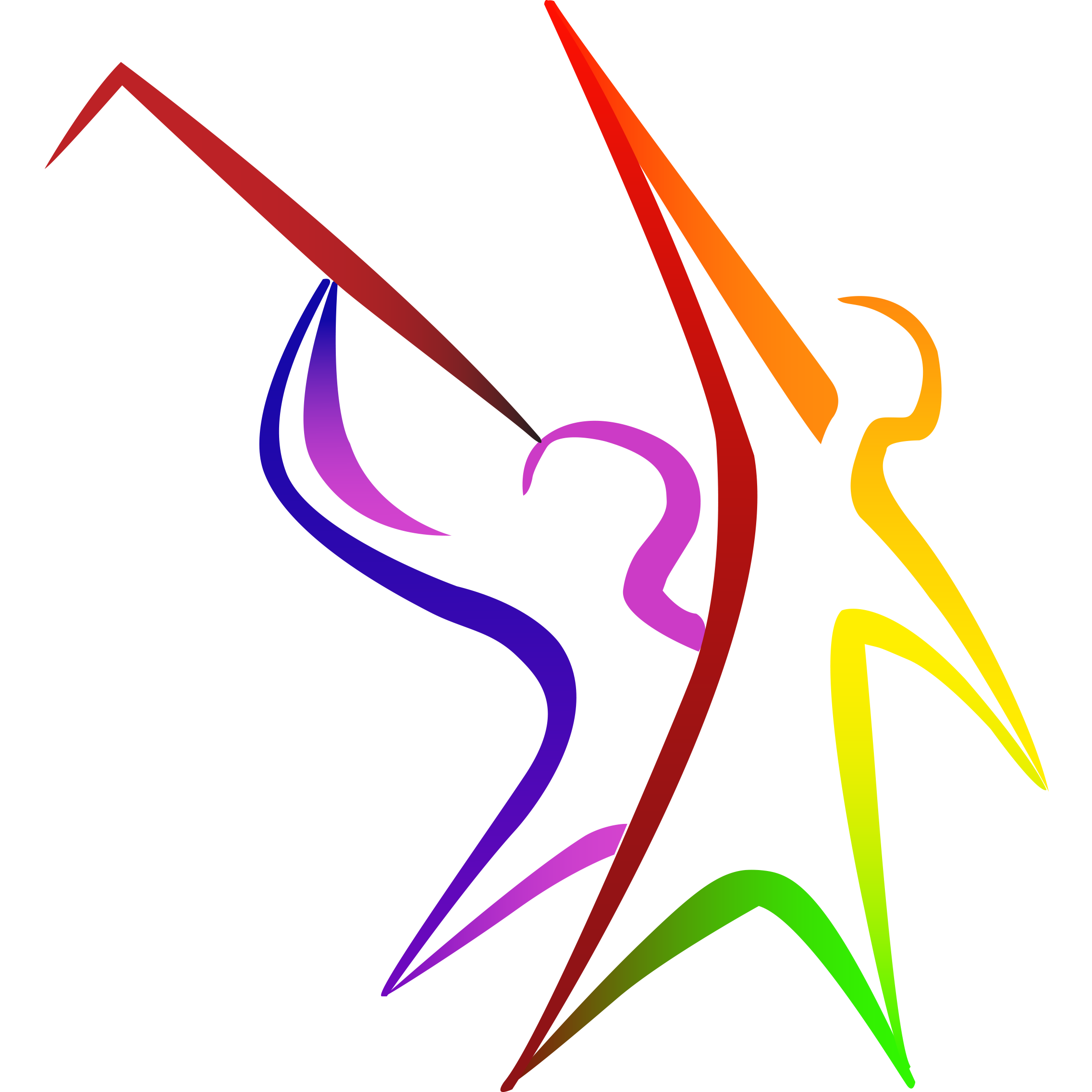
- Ad Astra Per Aspera
- Status: Active
- Genre: Astronomical Observation Competition
- Frequency: Annually
- Location: University of Peradeniya
- Country: Sri Lanka
- Years active: 22
- Inaugurated: January 30, 2004
- Participants: School Students
- Organiser: Anandian Astronomical Association, Astronomical Society of Mahamaya Girls' College.
- Website: www.starparty.ik

Star Party Sri Lanka, commonly known as Star Party, is an astronomical observation competition held in Sri Lanka since 2004, jointly organised by Ananda College, Colombo and Mahamaya Girls' College, Kandy. It is the longest-running inter-school astronomical observation competition in Sri Lanka. It happens annually at the University of Peradeniya premises typically in the first quarter of the year. However, in some years it was held in the other periods of the year due to various reasons. Star Party is considered the most important event in the Sri Lankan amateur astronomical calendar.

== Observation competition ==
Star Party night sky observation competition is the main focus event of the entire Star Party. High school students from all around the country teamed up and compete for the title "Best school-based astronomical observation team of the year" and the Star Party challenge trophy. A team consists of 5 members from the same school and there can be a maximum of two teams (namely A and B) that can compete from one school. The competition held under 6 sections as follows,

- Best in Moon observation.
- Best in planetary observation.
- Best in deep-sky observation and constellation mapping.
- Best in observational astronomy (Theory).
- Best in celestial measurements.

The highest-scoring team of each of those sections wins the sub-trophy for the respective titles. The team that has the highest total score for all these sections wins the Star Party Challenge trophy and crowned as the Champions of the Star Party.
