= Oregon Star Party =

- Organization: Oregon Star Party (OSP)
- Location: Ochoco National Forest
- Coordinates: 44.298775°N 120.141648°W
- Altitude: 5,000 feet (1,500 m)
- Weather: Variable weather & clear dark night skies
- Established: December 15, 1987
- Website: Oregon Star Party

The Oregon Star Party (OSP) was founded in 1987 and is considered one of the best annual events in the United States for observational astronomy. The Oregon Star Party takes place in the Ochoco National Forest, near the geographical center of the state of Oregon. It is far enough from population centers to provide some of the darkest skies in North America. The area's 5,000-foot (1,500 m) altitude contributes to steady seeing, which frequently provides near ideal observational conditions. The OSP site also has a treeless field of view providing an unobstructed 360 degree horizon.

Usually held in August or September during a new moon, OSP attracts as many as 600-800 attendees. The highest attendance was in 2003, with 900 attendees. OSP features a wide range of amenities such as a latte stand, chuckwagon stand, and showers. Many vendors sell various astronomy-related goods, and there is a swap meet every day during the four-day event.

Participation does not require a telescope, as most amateur astronomers let visitors look through their telescopes. Daytime events include guest speakers, such as telescope makers, NASA representatives, and optics manufacturers. Also, OSP has a guided tour through the "telescope fields" which discusses many of the different telescope designs and custom builds. OSP also offers activities for children and offers an observing challenge ranging in difficulty from beginner to advanced.

Due to its unique location, OSP attracts casual observers, professional observers, astro-photographers, and beginners interested in astronomy.

The Star Party was cancelled in 2020 on grounds of COVID-19 pandemic, and cancelled in 2021 due to fire risk.

== See also ==
- List of astronomical societies
