= Southern Cross Astronomical Society =

Amateur astronomy society in Florida

The Southern Cross Astronomical Society, founded in 1922, is one of the oldest amateur astronomy societies in the Western Hemisphere. It is located in the Physics Department of Florida International University in Miami, Florida.

As of February 2007, the society had over 600 members.

== See also ==
- List of astronomical societies
