= Office of Special Plans =

American intelligence unit (2002–03)

The Office of Special Plans (OSP), which existed from September 2002 to June 2003, was a Pentagon unit created by Paul Wolfowitz and Douglas Feith, and headed by Feith, as charged by then–United States Secretary of Defense Donald Rumsfeld, to supply senior George W. Bush administration officials with raw intelligence (unvetted by intelligence analysts, see Stovepiping) pertaining to Iraq. A similar unit, called the Iranian Directorate, was created several years later, in 2006, to deal with intelligence on Iran.

== Allegations of manipulation of intelligence ==
In an interview with the Scottish Sunday Herald, former Central Intelligence Agency (CIA) officer Larry C. Johnson said the OSP was "dangerous for US national security and a threat to world peace. [The OSP] lied and manipulated intelligence to further its agenda of removing Saddam. It's a group of ideologues with pre-determined notions of truth and reality. They take bits of intelligence to support their agenda and ignore anything contrary. They should be eliminated."

Seymour Hersh writes that, according to an unnamed Pentagon adviser, "[OSP] was created in order to find evidence of what Wolfowitz and his boss, Defense Secretary Donald Rumsfeld, wanted to be true—that Saddam Hussein had close ties to Al Qaeda, and that Iraq had an enormous arsenal of chemical, biological, and possibly even nuclear weapons (WMD) that threatened the region and, potentially, the United States. [...] 'The agency [CIA] was out to disprove linkage between Iraq and terrorism,' the Pentagon adviser told me. 'That's what drove them. If you've ever worked with intelligence data, you can see the ingrained views at C.I.A. that color the way it sees data.' The goal of Special Plans, he said, was 'to put the data under the microscope to reveal what the intelligence community can't see.'"

These allegations are supported by an annex to the first part of Senate Intelligence Committee's Report of Pre-war Intelligence on Iraq published in July 2004. The review, which was highly critical of the CIA's Iraq intelligence generally but found its judgments were right on the lack of an Iraq-al Qaeda relationship, suggests that the OSP, if connected to an "Iraqi intelligence cell" also headed by Douglas Feith which is described in the annex, sought to discredit and cast doubt on CIA analysis in an effort to establish a connection between Saddam Hussein and terrorism. In one instance, in response to a cautious CIA report, Iraq and al-Qa'eda: A Murky Relationship, the annex relates that "one of the individuals working for the [intelligence cell led by Feith] stated that the June [2002] report, '...should be read for content only – and CIA's interpretation ought to be ignored.'"

In 2004, Mother Jones published an investigative report by Jason Vest and Robert Dreyfuss about the Office of Special Plans. In a February 2004 interview with FAIR Dreyfuss said that the Bush administration had already decided to invade Iraq but needed a reason that would satisfy the US public and the Congress so "they picked on this "Iraq is a threat" argument. He said the OSP "took these piles and piles of information, with thousands of little data bits, and they picked out the ones that supported the case for going to war, and they discarded all the rest".

Douglas Feith called the office's report a much-needed critique of the CIA's intelligence. "It's healthy to criticize the CIA's intelligence", Feith said. "What the people in the Pentagon were doing was right. It was good government." Feith also rejected accusations he attempted to link Iraq to a formal relationship with Al Qaeda. "No one in my office ever claimed there was an operational relationship", Feith said. "There was a relationship."

In another instance, an "Iraqi intelligence cell" briefing to Rumsfeld and Wolfowitz in August 2002 condemned the CIA's intelligence assessment techniques and denounced the CIA's "consistent underestimation" of matters dealing with the alleged Iraq–Al-Qaeda co-operation. In September 2002, two days before the CIA's final assessment of the Iraq-al Qaeda relationship, Feith briefed senior advisers to Dick Cheney and Condoleezza Rice, undercutting the CIA's credibility and alleging "fundamental problems" with CIA intelligence-gathering. As reported in the conservative British newspaper The Daily Telegraph, "Senator Jay Rockefeller, senior Democrat on the [Senate] committee, said that Mr Feith's cell may even have undertaken 'unlawful' intelligence-gathering initiatives."

In February 2007, the Pentagon's inspector general issued a report that concluded that Feith's office "developed, produced, and then disseminated alternative intelligence assessments on the Iraq and al Qaida relationship, which included some conclusions that were inconsistent with the consensus of the Intelligence Community, to senior decision-makers." The report found that these actions were "inappropriate" though not "illegal." Senator Carl Levin, Chair of the Senate Armed Services Committee, stated that "The bottom line is that intelligence relating to the Iraq–al-Qaeda relationship was manipulated by high-ranking officials in the Department of Defense to support the administration's decision to invade Iraq. The inspector general's report is a devastating condemnation of inappropriate activities in the DOD policy office that helped take this nation to war." At Senator Levin's insistence, on April 6, 2007, the Pentagon's Inspector General's Report was declassified and released to the public.

Feith stated that he "felt vindicated" by the report. He told the Washington Post that his office produced "a criticism of the consensus of the intelligence community, and in presenting it I was not endorsing its substance."

Feith also said the inspector general's report amounted to circular logic: "The people in my office were doing a criticism of the intelligence community consensus", Feith said. "By definition, that criticism varied. If it didn't vary, they wouldn't have done the criticism."

== Alleged unlawful activities ==
Journalist Larisa Alexandrovna of The Raw Story reported in 2006 that the OSP "deployed several extra-legal and unapproved task force missions" in Iraq both before and after the beginning of combat. The teams operated independently of other operations, occasionally causing confusion on the battlefield. The teams appear to have had a political rather than military mission; specifically, to find Iraqi intelligence officers willing to come up with evidence of WMD in Iraq whether or not such weapons actually existed:

"They come in the summer of 2003, bringing in Iraqis, interviewing them", [a source close to the UN Security Council] said. "Then they start talking about WMD and they say to [these Iraqi intelligence officers] that 'Our President is in trouble. He went to war saying there are WMD and there are no WMD. What can we do? Can you help us?'"

According to the United Nations source, the intelligence officers did not cooperate with the OSP forces because they were aware that forged WMD evidence "would not pass the smell test and could be shown to be not of Iraqi origin and not using Iraqi methodology."

== Indictment for espionage ==
Lawrence Franklin, an analyst and Iran expert in the Feith office, has been charged with espionage, as part of a larger FBI investigation (see Lawrence Franklin espionage scandal). The scandal involves passing information regarding United States policy towards Iran to Israel via the American Israel Public Affairs Committee. Feith's role is also being investigated.

According to The Guardian, Feith's office had an unconventional relationship with Israel's intelligence services:

The OSP was an open and largely unfiltered conduit to the White House not only for the Iraqi opposition. It also forged close ties to a parallel, ad hoc intelligence operation inside Ariel Sharon's office in Israel specifically to bypass Mossad and provide the Bush administration with more alarmist reports on Saddam's Iraq than Mossad was prepared to authorise.

"None of the Israelis who came were cleared into the Pentagon through normal channels," said one source familiar with the visits. Instead, they were waved in on Mr Feith's authority without having to fill in the usual forms.

The exchange of information continued a long-standing relationship with Mr Feith and other Washington neo-conservatives had with Israel's Likud party.

Allegations have also been made that Pentagon employees in the Feith office have been involved in plans for overthrowing the governments of Iran and Syria.

When Former NSA Chief General Michael Hayden testified before the Senate Hearing on his nomination as Director of Central Intelligence in May 2006, he was questioned by Senator Carl Levin (D-MI) on the pressure exerted by the Office of Special Plans on the intelligence community over the question of Hussein's links to al-Qaeda. Hayden explained that he was not comfortable with the OSP's analysis:

I got three great kids, but if you tell me go out and find all the bad things they've done, Hayden, I can build you a pretty good dossier, and you'd think they were pretty bad people, because that was what I was looking for and that's what I'd build up. That would be very wrong. That would be inaccurate. That would be misleading.

He also acknowledged that after "repeated inquiries from the Feith office" he put a disclaimer on NSA intelligence assessments of Iraq/al-Qaeda contacts.

== See also ==
- Office of Public Diplomacy
- Oversight of United States covert operations
- Abram Shulsky
- Team B—a group formed by the CIA in May 1976 to evaluate classified intelligence on the Soviet Union
