= B. V. Sreekantan =

Indian astrophysicist (1925–2019)

- Born: June 30, 1925; Nanjangud, Karnataka, India
- Died: October 27, 2019 (aged 94); Bengaluru, Karnataka, India
- Education: Mysore University; Indian Institute of Science; Tata Institute of Fundamental Research; University of Mumbai
- Known for: Studies on proton decay
- Awards: 1977 C. V. Raman Award; 1978 INSA Homi Bhabha Medal; 1982 R. D. Birla Memorial Award; 1987 IISc Distinguished Alumni Award; 1988 Padma Bhushan; 1989 ISC Ramanujan Award; Jawaharlal Nehru Award; 1998 Rajyotsava Prashasti; 2003 Yodh Prize; 2004 Sir M. Visvesvaraya Senior Scientist State Award
- Scientific career
- Fields: Astrophysics
- Workplaces: Tata Institute of Fundamental Research

Badanaval Venkatasubba Sreekantan (30 June 1925- 27 October 2019) was an Indian high-energy astrophysicist and a former associate of Homi J. Bhabha at the Tata Institute of Fundamental Research (TIFR). He was also a Dr. S. Radhakrishnan Visiting Professor at the National Institute of Advanced Studies, Bangalore.

Known for his studies in the fields of cosmic rays, elementary particles, and high-energy X-ray astronomics, Sreekantan was an elected fellow of all the three major Indian science academies namely, the Indian Academy of Sciences, the Indian National Science Academy and the National Academy of Sciences, India as well as the Maharashtra Academy of Sciences. He was also an associate of Bruno Rossi at Massachusetts Institute of Technology. The Government of India awarded him the Padma Bhushan, India's third highest civilian honour, in 1988.

== Biography ==
University of Mysore.

Sreekantan hailed from a family of temple priests; he was born to Laxmi Devi and Badanaval Venkata Pandit on 30 June 1925, in the small hamlet of Nanjangud, located in the erstwhile Mysore state (present day Karnataka). He was the fifth of eight sons and three daughters born to the Pandit couple, whose Telugu speaking ancestors had migrated from Andhra Pradesh to Karnataka. B. V. Pandit, an Ayurvedic physician by profession and the formulator of Nanjagud Ayurvedic Dental Powder, was scholastically inclined and maintained a home library that helped Sreekantan develop a reading habit from an early age. Sreekantan attended the local high school in Nanjangud and completed his intermediate degree course at Mysore. He secured his graduate degree in physics, with honours, in 1946 and completed his master's degree the following year, specializing in Wireless communication, from Mysore University. He continued his studies as a research scholar at the Indian Institute of Science, Bangalore, but moved to Mumbai in 1948 to the Tata Institute of Fundamental Research (TIFR) when Homi J. Bhabha invited him for advanced research in cosmic ray physics. His research at TIFR earned him a PhD from the University of Mumbai in 1954.

Sreekantan resided in Malleswaram, a suburb of the south Indian city of Bengaluru. He married Ratna, a classical musician, in 1953; she died in 2006.

Sreekantan died 27 October 2019 at his home in Bangalore.

== Career and legacy ==
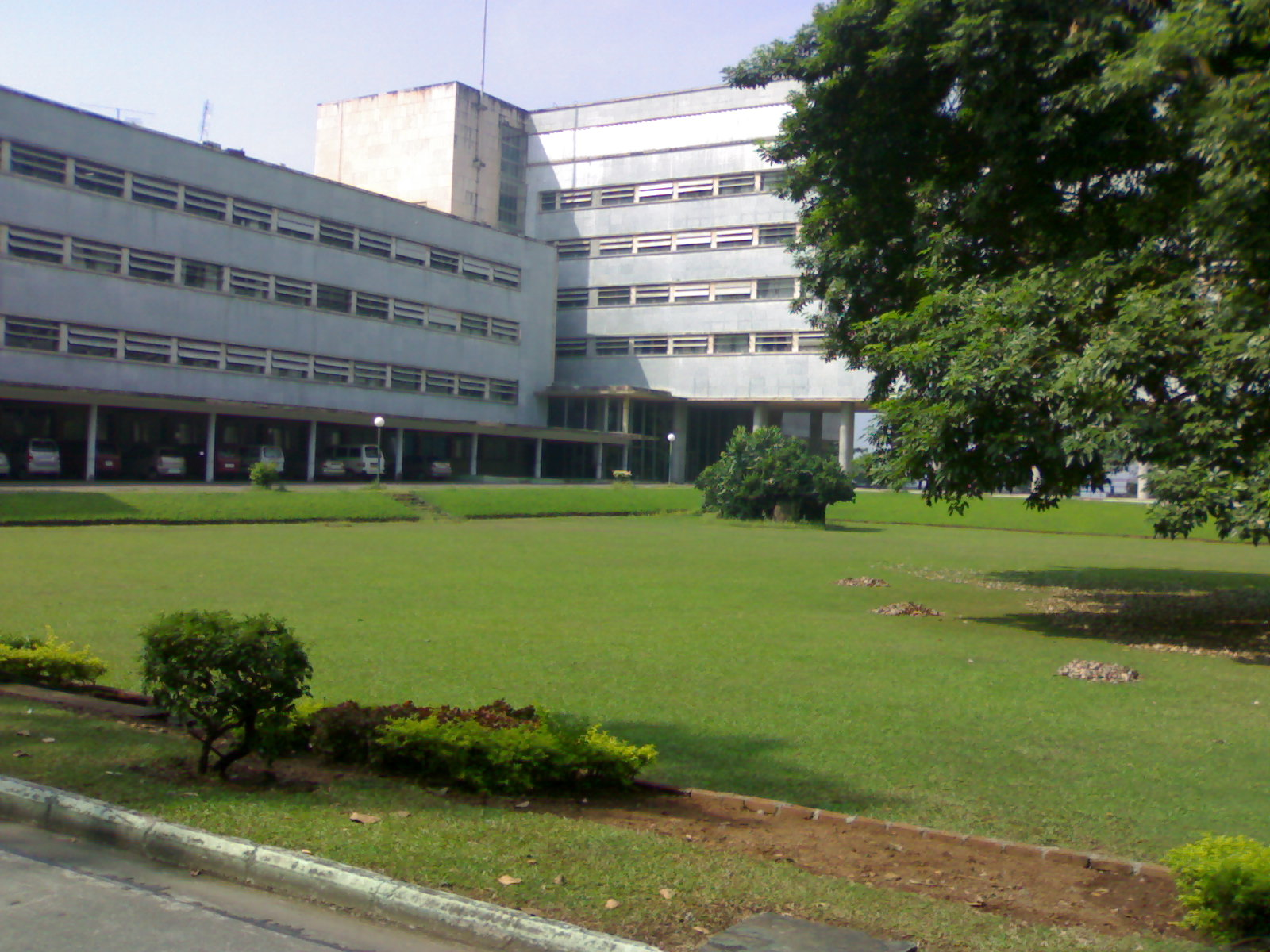
Tata Institute of Fundamental Research, Mumbai

Sreekantan stayed at TIFR for 39 years, and before his retirement from TIFR service in 1987, he served as the director of the institute from 1975. At TIFR, he initiated many research streams in cosmic ray physics and astrophysics and the research team he established for studies in high energy cosmic rays is still active. One of his early assignments at TIFR was the study of cosmic-ray-produced muons detected deep underground and Sreekantan conducted experiments at Kolar Gold Mines in Karnataka, for the detection of the elementary particles at 2760 m deep. Though his experiments failed to find cosmic ray produced muons, he continued his search, which resulted in the detection of cosmic ray produced neutrinos, reportedly the first detection of the subatomic particles at such depth. His experiments served as the base of his doctoral thesis on the intensity and angular distribution of muons at different depths, prepared under the guidance of Homi Bhabha. A noted Italian experimental physicist, Bruno Rossi of Massachusetts Institute of Technology, examined the thesis and Mumbai University awarded him PhD in 1954.

Sreekantan's first stint at the Massachusetts Institute of Technology in 1954 was when he worked with Rossi on cloud chambers and K-mesons. During that trip, he visited several laboratories in the UK and France to familiarize himself with the advances in high energy physics. He also visited Brookhaven National Laboratory and conducted experiments on K-meson decay which resulted in the publication of three scientific papers, jointly written with Herbert S. Bridge and others. Once back at TIFR, he started a new series of balloon-borne experiments for studying cosmic X-ray sources above 20 keV which helped in the future development of X-ray detectors for X-ray astronomy missions. Three X-ray instruments developed by his group were carried on the Astrosat, the first Indian multiwavelength astronomy observatory, which was launched in October 2015.

Sreekantan was known to have furthered the studies of Homi Bhabha and Damodar Dharmananda Kosambi on the lifespan and decay spectrum of muons. He set up his laboratory using war-surplus goods from World War II procured by TIFR as well as from other sources and with the assistance of H. L. N. Murthy, an expert in glass work, who helped him in the development of Geiger counters, he measured the lifespan of the positive muons as 2.24±0.15 microseconds. His findings were published in the Indian journal, Proceedings of Indian Academy of Sciences in 1951.

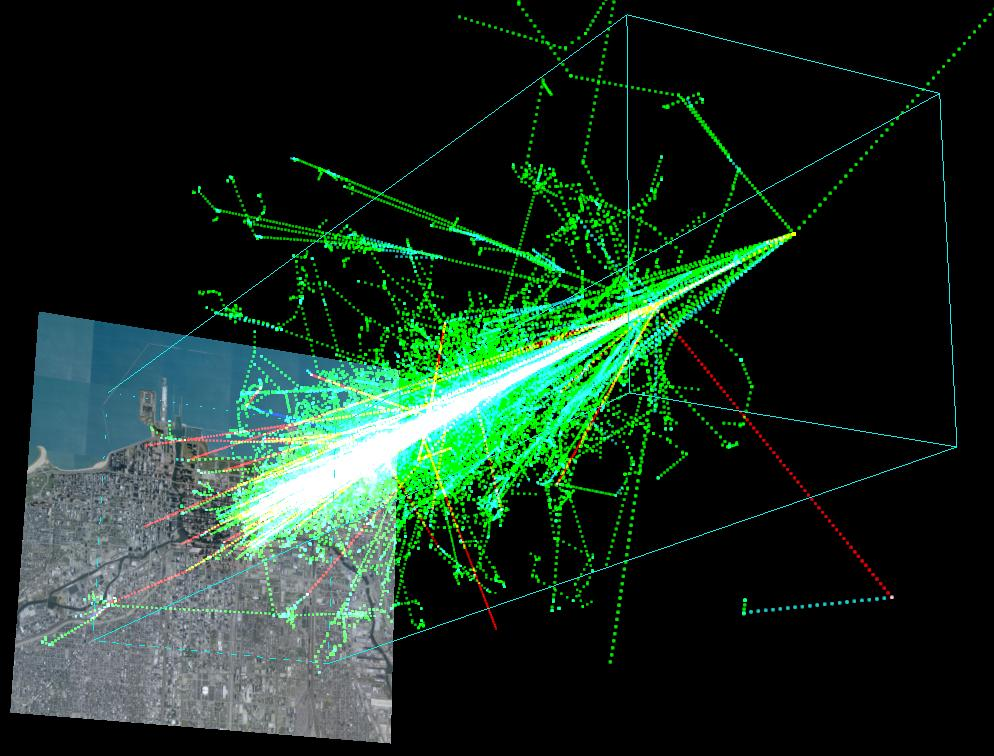
Cosmic ray air shower created by a 1TeV proton hitting the atmosphere 20 km above the Earth (simulation)

When a joint team of Durham University, UK, Osaka City University, and TIFR started experiments for studying neutrinos at a depth of 2.3 km, Sreekantan was a part of the team which recorded 18 events of neutrino interactions in rock. He was also a member of the team that worked on the Grand Unification Theory, to detect the decay of protons in subterranean environment, in the 1970s, the other members of the team included M. G. K. Menon. He assisted Homi Bhabha in the installation of two cloud chambers, Rani and Maharani at the cosmic ray laboratory in Ooty in 1954. Later, a larger cloud chamber, the largest one in India till then, and an air shower array were also set up there, with his assistance. He also designed, together with Subramanian and Ramamurthy, a total absorption spectrometer and an air Cherenkov counter, and the experiments revealed to Sreekantan and his associate, S. C. Tonwar, that increase in energy was an influential factor in the increase of nucleon-anti nucleon production cross section. Their findings have been published in Palau International Coral Reef Center (PICRC) journal in 1979. Along with R. H. Vatcha, he measured charged to neutral (C/N) ratio for high energy hadrons in showers of 1014–1016 eV energy range (Note: Directly quoted from source) and arrived at the conclusion that copious production of baryons in high energy interactions is inevitable (Note: Directly quoted from source). These experiments confirmed baryon production in hadron-air nucleus collisions at 1015 eV.

As the director of the TIFR, he was instrumental in the establishment of several research centres such as Homi Bhabha Centre for Science Education Mumbai, National Centre for Biological Sciences Bengaluru, National Centre for Radio Astrophysics Pune and TIFR Centre for Applicable Mathematics, Bengaluru. His contributions are also reported in the expansion of the TIFR Balloon Facility at Hyderabad. It was during his tenure that the Pelletron Accelerator, a joint project of the TIFR and the Bhabha Atomic Research Centre was approved. He inspired Govind Swarup to prepare the proposal for the establishment of the Giant Metrewave Radio Telescope (GMRT) at Khodad, Pune. It was under his directorship, TIFR staff was included in the BARC contributory health service scheme. He also initiated a staff pension scheme, the proposal for company quarters for TIFR employees, subsidised housing loans and welfare schemes for lower grade staff.

After his retirement from TIFR, Sreekantan was offered the INSA Srinivasa Ramanujan chair which he held till 1992, when he moved to the National Institute of Advanced Studies (NIAS) in Bengaluru, accepting the Radhakrishnan Visiting Professor chair. At NIAS, he was involved in the studies related to the application of physics and mathematical tools in processing biological systems, along with R. L. Kapur, a notable psychiatrist, and continued with the studies after the death of Kapur in 2006.

Sreekantan was associated with several notable scientific personalities such as Homi Bhabha, M. G. K. Menon, Raja Ramanna, S. Naranan, R. L. Kapur, Ramanath Cowsik, V. S. Narasimham, S. V. Damle and G. S. Gokhale. He delivered many keynote addresses at national and international conferences, mentored many scientists in their doctoral research and was the author of over 300 scientific papers. He was also credited with the publication of five books, either as the author or editor.

His studies have been documented by way of one book, Extensive Air Showers and a number of articles. (Note: Please see Selected bibliography – Scientific publications section) He wrote a monograph on Cosmic Rays : Current Status and Future Directions for Homi Bhabha Fellowships Council (unknown if finished before his death). He also wrote three books namely, Remembering Einstein: Lectures on Physics and Astrophysics, Interdisciplinary Perspectives on Consciousness and the Self and Nature’s Longest Threads: New Frontiers in Mathematics and Physics of Information in Biology as well as several articles on general science topics for the propagation of science. (Note: Please see Selected bibliography - General publications section)

== Positions ==
The Indian Institute of Astrophysics (IIA), established in 1786 by William Petrie, was modernised in 1960 by Vainu Bappu, the renowned Indian astronomer, and Sreekantan became associated with the institute during this time. The institute, functioning under the Ministry of Civil Aviation, was brought under the jurisdiction of the Department of Science and Technology in 1985 with the efforts of Raja Ramanna and Sreekantan, when it was made an autonomous institution. He was a member of the governing council of the institute from 1988 till 2007, a total of 19 years, of which 15 years from 1992, he served as the chairman of the council. It was during his tenancy as the chairman, the institute set up the Himalayan Chandra Telescope (HCT) at Hanle, Ladakh at an altitude of 14000 ft. He is also credited with assisting Ramanath Cowsik with the establishment of a new campus for IIA at Hoskote in Karnataka and in the construction of housing for the staff of the institute.

Sreekantan served as the visiting professor at the Massachusetts Institute of Technology for two terms, the first from 1954 to 1955 and subsequently from 1965 to 1967. He was associated with the University of Tokyo as their JSPS visiting professor in 1977 and taught at the University of California, Irvine and the University of California, San Diego during 1993–94. He served as the president of the Indian Physics Association (1976–78) and the physics section of the Indian Science Congress (1981). He held the post of the vice chairman of the IUPAP Cosmic Ray Commission from 1987 to 1993, sat as a member of the Atomic Energy Commission during 1985–86 and held the chair of the Research Council of National Physical Laboratory, New Delhi. During 1986–88, he served as the vice president of the Indian Academy of Sciences. He was an editorial fellow of the Project of History of Indian Science, Philosophy and Culture and chaired the Gandhi Centre for Science and Human Values of Bharatiya Vidya Bhavan. He also serves as the chairman of the board of directors of Sadvaidyasala, an Ayurvedic medicine company founded by his father. Much of his later scientific work involved the study of the phenomenon of consciousness and its relationship with the physical sciences.

== Awards and honours ==
Sreekantan was an elected fellow of four major science academies in India; the Indian Academy of Sciences (1965), the Indian National Science Academy (1976), the National Academy of Sciences, India (1989) and the Maharashtra Academy of Sciences. He is an honorary fellow of the Tata Institute of Fundamental Research and the Indian Institute of Astrophysics, Bengaluru. The University Grants Commission of India awarded him the C. V. Raman Award in 1977 and selected him as the UGC National Lecturer in 1978, the same year as he delivered the PMS Blackett Memorial Award Lecture of INSA–Royal Society of London. One more award reached him in 1978, the Homi Bhabha Medal from the Indian National Science Academy.

Four years later, the Indian Physics Association awarded Sreekantan the R. D. Birla Memorial Award. He received four awards from various governments, starting with the third highest civilian honour of Padma Bhushan from the Government of India in 1988. The Indian Institute of Science Distinguished Alumni Award and the Ramanujan Award of the Indian Science Congress were awarded to him in 1987 and 1989 respectively and the Government of Madhya Pradesh awarded him the Jawaharlal Nehru Award in 1991. He was awarded the Rajyotsava Prashasti by the Government of Karnataka in 1998 and six years later, the government followed it up with the Sir M. Visvesvaraya Senior Scientist State Award in 2004.

== Selected bibliography ==
=== Scientific publications ===
==== Books ====
- S., Rao, M. V.; Sreekantan, B. V. (1998). Extensive air showers. Singapore: World Scientific. ISBN 9789810228880. OCLC 40516567.

==== Articles ====
- Vatcha, R. H.; Sreekantan, B. V. (1973). "Evidence for change in the characteristics of strong interactions at ultra-high energies". Journal of Physics A: Mathematical, Nuclear and General. 6 (7): 1067. Bibcode:1973JPhA....6.1067V. doi:10.1088/0305-4470/6/7/027. ISSN 0301-0015.
- Vatcha, R. H.; Sreekantan, B. V. (1973). "Trends in the energy dependence of strong interaction characteristics at ultra-high energies". Journal of Physics A: Mathematical, Nuclear and General. 6 (12): 1990. Bibcode:1973JPhA....6.1990V. doi:10.1088/0305-4470/6/12/524. ISSN 0301-0015.
- Sreekantan, B. V.; Cowsik, R. (1986). "Cosmic pathways : contemporary perspectives in physics and astrophysics". Tata McGraw-Hill Pub. Co. OCLC 610404778.

=== General publications ===
==== Books ====
- Sreekantan, B.V. (2009). Science, technology, and society. Shimla: Indian Institute of Advanced Study. ISBN 978-8179860748. OCLC 373562272.
- Sreekantan, B. V. (2010). Remembering Einstein : lectures on physics and astrophysics. New Delhi: Oxford University Press. ISBN 9780198064497. OCLC 501394980.
- Sreekantan, B. V.; Menon, Sangeetha; Sinha, Anindya (2014). Interdisciplinary perspectives on consciousness and the self. New Delhi. ISBN 9788132215875. OCLC 866635850.
- Balakrihnan, Janaki; Sreekantan, B. V. (2014). Nature's longest threads : new frontiers in the mathematics and physics of information in biology. Nature's Longest Threads: New Frontiers in the Mathematics and Physics of Information in Biology. Edited by Balakrishnan Janaki & Sreekantan B V. Published by World Scientific Publishing Co. Pte. Ltd. Bibcode:2014nltn.book.....B. doi:10.1142/9204. ISBN 9789814612463. OCLC 886539946.

==== Articles ====
- Sreekantan, B. V. (1 July 1998). "Homi Bhabha and cosmic ray research in India". Resonance. 3 (7): 18–27. doi:10.1007/bf02837309. ISSN 0971-8044. S2CID 120940624.
- Sreekantan, B. V. (2009). Science, technology, and society. Shimla: Indian Institute of Advanced Study. ISBN 978-8179860748. OCLC 373562272.
- "Prof DD Kosambi- some reminiscences". Resonance. June 2011.
- Sreekantan, B. V. (Badanaval Venkata) (2007). Dr. Raja Ramanna, his life and work. Bangalore: Bhavan's Gandhi Centre of Science and Human Values. ISBN 9788189220174. OCLC 295034766.

== See also ==
- Observational astrophysics
- Radio astronomy
- Neutrino astronomy
- Subrahmanyan Chandrasekhar
