= D. J. Saikia =

Indian astrophysicist and radio astronomer

Dhruba J. Saikia
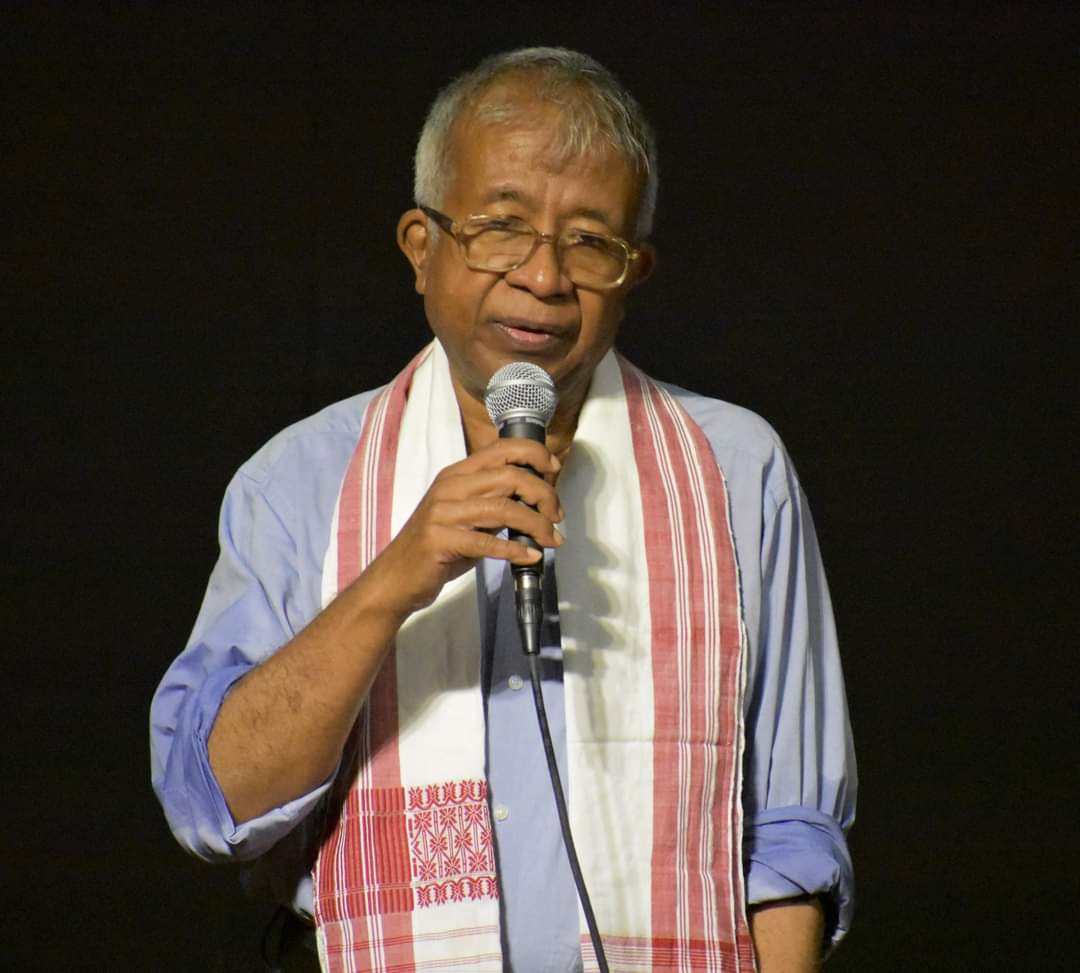
- Dhruba J. Saikia
- Born: 21 January 1956 (age 70); Jorhat, Assam
- Education: St. Edmund's School, Shillong; Hindu College, Delhi University; Gwyer Hall, Delhi University; Tata Institute of Fundamental Research, Mumbai
- Known for: Active galaxies, Radio galaxies and Quasars, Radio astronomy, Education
- Awards: Geeta Udgaonkar Award of the Tata Institute of Fundamental Research for the best Ph.D. thesis (1985-86); Young Scientist of the Year Award by the Indian National Science Academy (1985); Prof. M.K. Vainu Bappu Gold Medal of the Astronomical Society of India (1990)
- Scientific career
- Fields: Astronomy, Astrophysics, Radio astronomy, Education
- Workplaces: National Centre for Radio Astrophysics, TIFR; Jodrell Bank Observatory, University of Manchester; Queen's University, Kingston, Canada; University of Western Australia; Australia Telescope National Facility, CSIRO Astronomy and Space Science; Cotton University; Inter-University Centre for Astronomy and Astrophysics
- Thesis: PhD Thesis Jets and compact features in extragalactic radio sources (1985)
- Doctoral advisor: Vijay Kapahi, Govind Swarup

Dhruba J. Saikia FNAsc is an Indian astrophysicist and radio astronomer, with a keen interest in education, especially higher education. He was a professor at the National Centre for Radio Astrophysics (NCRA), part of the Tata Institute of Fundamental Research (TIFR) where he worked for over 40 years and is now at the IUCAA where he heads the Teaching Learning Centre and the National Resource Centre, which constitute the Astronomy Centre for Educators (ACE). Besides TIFR and IUCAA, he has been engaged in research and/or teaching at the Jodrell Bank Observatory of the University of Manchester, National Radio Astronomy Observatory USA, Queen's University at Kingston, Canada, Australia Telescope National Facility, CSIRO Astronomy and Space Science division, Australia, the University of Western Australia, Savitribai Phule Pune University and Cotton University, India.

Saikia's research interests are in the fields of extragalactic astronomy, radio astronomy, and education. Along with Vijay Kapahi, he contributed to the early development of the unification scheme for AGN, and has been invited to review areas where he has made significant contributions. These include reviews titled Polarization properties of extragalactic radio sources with C. J. Salter, Compact steep-spectrum and peaked-spectrum radio sources with Christopher P. O'Dea, Jets in radio galaxies and quasars: an observational perspective, and Decoding the giant extragalactic radio sources with Pratik Dabhade and Mousumi Mahato. He contributed a Chapter to the Indian Higher Education Report 2023 titled Institutional Research in Higher Education: Learning from an Experiment at Cotton University.

Dhruba J. Saikia was the founding Vice-Chancellor of Cotton University in Guwahati when the historic Cotton College, founded in 1901, was converted to a university in 2012. He was the Dean of the National Centre for Radio Astrophysics Faculty from 2007–2009 and a member of the statutory bodies of a number of institutions. He was a member of the Senate of Indian Institute of Technology Guwahati, Academic Council of Tezpur University, Management Board for Centre of Plasma Physics - Institute for Plasma Research, Governing Board of Omeo Kumar Das Institute of Social Change and Development, Governing Board of IIIT Guwahati, Governing Board and Academic Council of Assam Don Bosco University and Academic Council, TIFR Deemed University. He was the Executive President of the Physics Academy of North East (PANE) from 2017 to 2019 and is a founding Fellow of PANE (FPANE).

Saikia is also a wildlife enthusiast, especially of birds, and contributes regularly to The Cornell Lab of Ornithology portal ebird.org. He was awarded the Adventurous eBirder of the Year in 2019 by Bird Count India.

== Early life and education ==
Dhruba Saikia was born on 21 January 1956 in Jorhat, Assam, the home of both of his parents. He spent his early childhood and school years in the town Shillong, Meghalaya. Both his parents were teachers. His mother, Devika Saikia, taught Assamese literature at Sankardev College, Shillong, while his father, Debendra Nath Saikia, taught Commercial geography at St. Anthony's College, Shillong. Dhruba Saikia studied in St. Edmund's School from 1961 to 1971, passing the Indian School Certificate Examination conducted by the University of Cambridge Local Examinations Syndicate in 1971.

After completing his school education in Shillong, Saikia, a National Science Talent Scholarship recipient, joined Hindu College, Delhi in 1972. He received his B.Sc. with Physics honors from Delhi University in 1975, and joined Gwyer Hall for his postgraduate studies. He received his M.Sc. in physics from Delhi University in 1977, and soon took a regular position in the Radio Astronomy Group of the Tata Institute of Fundamental Research, and joined at Ooty on 16 August 1977. It was an exciting time for the group. The Ooty Radio Telescope, built indigenously by a very young group led by Govind Swarup, produced many interesting results and provided additional evidence in support of the Big Bang model of the Universe just a couple of years earlier.

After spending two years at Ooty, he shifted to the TIFR Centre in the campus of the Indian Institute of Science, Bengaluru, where he did most of his Ph.D. work, completing his thesis in 1985 under the guidance of Vijay Kapahi and Govind Swarup. The degree was awarded by the University of Bombay. It was an exciting period in radio astronomy when the Very Large Array in New Mexico came into operation producing high-quality radio images using techniques of self-calibration. These observations demonstrated the ubiquitousness of radio jets in radio-loud active galactic nuclei. Saikia's thesis on jets and compact features in extragalactic radio sources was based extensively on observations made with the Very Large Array where he spent several months during the summer of 1982.

Saikia took up a postdoctoral position at the Jodrell Bank Observatory of the University of Manchester in 1986. After spending a few enriching and fruitful years at the Jodrell Bank Observatory, he returned to Pune, India in 1989. The Radio Astronomy Group of TIFR was in the process of setting up the National Centre for Radio Astrophysics at Pune, and building the Giant Metrewave Radio Telescope about 80 km north of Pune, which continues to be one of the most powerful radio telescopes operating at low radio frequencies.

== Career and research ==
After joining the Radio Astronomy Group of TIFR on 16 August 1977, Saikia continued to be a part of the group which later became the National Centre for Radio Astrophysics, until his superannuation on 31 January 2018. During this period he also worked at other institutions besides TIFR and Jodrell Bank Observatory. Saikia was a Visiting Professor and International visiting scholar at Queen's University at Kingston, Canada, during 2000–2001, working with Judith Irwin on nearby galaxies. He was a distinguished visitor at the Australia Telescope National Facility, CSIRO Astronomy and Space Science division, Sydney in 2009, and visiting professor at the International Centre for Radio Astronomy Research, University of Western Australia during 2009–2010. Saikia was a visiting scientist at the National Radio Astronomy Observatory in Socorro, New Mexico, USA in 2011, as part of the Resident Shared Risk Observing (RSRO) program, making the initial observations and testing data reduction procedures with Judith Irwin for the CHANG-ES (Continuum Halos in Nearby Galaxies—an EVLA Survey) project with the then-newly Expanded Very Large Array and now known as the Karl G. Jansky Very Large Array.

In addition to his early interests and contributions to jets in active galactic nuclei (AGN) and unification schemes, his research interests cover a wide spectrum. These include the evolution of radio galaxies from their sub-galactic dimensions to the largest single objects in the universe spanning about 15 million light years, episodic or recurrent jet active activity in AGN, radio continuum surveys, neutral atomic hydrogen in galaxies, clusters of galaxies, high energy emission from radio-loud AGN, starburst galaxies, outflows in nearby galaxies, star formation, and AGN activity in nearby galaxies. He has been a part of major international collaborations such as the CHANG-ES project led by Judith Irwin, LeMMINGs (Legacy e-MERLIN Multi-band Imaging of Nearby Galaxy Sample) survey led primarily by Rob Beswick, Ranieri Baldi, and Bil Dullo, and SAGAN (Search and Analysis of GRGs with Associated Nuclei), a systematic study of giant radio galaxies (GRGs) led by Pratik Dabhade.

In 2012, Saikia took the position as the first vice-chancellor of Cotton University (then known as Cotton College State University), Assam, India, which was established in 2012 on the foundations of the historic Cotton College established in 1901. He continued as the vice-chancellor util 27 July 2017, seeing through the amalgamation of the college and the university into one unitary structure on 1 June 2017. After his superannuation from TIFR on 31 January 2018, Saikia joined IUCAA in February 2018 and headed the Astronomy Centre for Educators (ACE) at IUCAA, which consists of the Teaching Learning Centre and the National Resource Centre. At IUCAA he devoted his time to carrying out a wide range of programmes and creating resources for improving pedagogic processes in astronomy and astrophysics in institutions of higher education in India.

In recent years, Saikia's research interests have covered aspects of higher education in India. During 2012–2017, while setting up Cotton University, Saikia had been looking into some of the problems confronting higher education in India, and also underlining the importance of maintaining institutional-level data. Such data besides being important for research is also crucial for formulating policies and monitoring their outcomes. Some of the topics explored include areas of silence in debates on higher education outlined in an occasional paper published by the Nehru Memorial Museum and Library; issues affecting research outcomes in our universities; and results of an experiment in Cotton University to engage with questions, such as the fairness and effectiveness of examination and evaluation systems, and the correlation of a student's academic performance with prior education and social background. Saikia advocates institutional research in higher educational institutions in India.

== Editorial work ==
Saikia was the Editor of the Bulletin of the Astronomical Society of India (BASI) from 2010 to 2015, a quarterly journal published in English by the Astronomical Society of India (ASI), and the Series Editor of the Astronomical Society of India Conference Series. BASI merged with the Journal of Astrophysics and Astronomy in 2017 December. Saikia was a member of the editorial board of Resonance, Journal of Science Education, published by the Indian Academy of Sciences and Springer from 2015 to 2020. He co-edited two volumes: Low-Frequency Radio Universe along with D. A. Green, Yashwant Gupta and T. Venturi, published by the Astronomical Society of the Pacific in 2009, and Fluid Flows to Black Holes, A tribute to S Chandrasekhar on His Birth Centenary, along with Virginia Trimble and published by World Scientific in 2013. He is presently an associate editor of Astrophysics and Space Science, published by Springer.
