= Gopal Krishna (astronomer) =

Indian radio astronomer

- Born: 12 March 1948 (age 78); Delhi, India
- Education: Agra University; BARC Training School; Bombay University
- Known for: Studies on Radio galaxies and Quasars
- Awards: 1993 Shanti Swarup Bhatnagar Prize
- Scientific career
- Fields: Radio astronomy
- Workplaces: Tata Institute of Fundamental Research; Max Planck Institute for Radio Astronomy; National Centre for Radio Astrophysics; European Southern Observatory; Space Telescope Science Institute
- Doctoral advisor: Govind Swarup

Gopal Krishna (born 12 March 1948) is an Indian radio astronomer and a senior professor at the National Centre for Radio Astrophysics. Known for his studies on Radio galaxies and quasars, Krishna is an elected fellow of all the three major Indian science academies viz. Indian Academy of Sciences, National Academy of Sciences, India and Indian National Science Academy. The Council of Scientific and Industrial Research, the apex agency of the Government of India for scientific research, awarded him the Shanti Swarup Bhatnagar Prize for Science and Technology, one of the highest Indian science awards, for his contributions to physical sciences in 1993. (Note: Long link - please select award year to see details)

== Biography ==
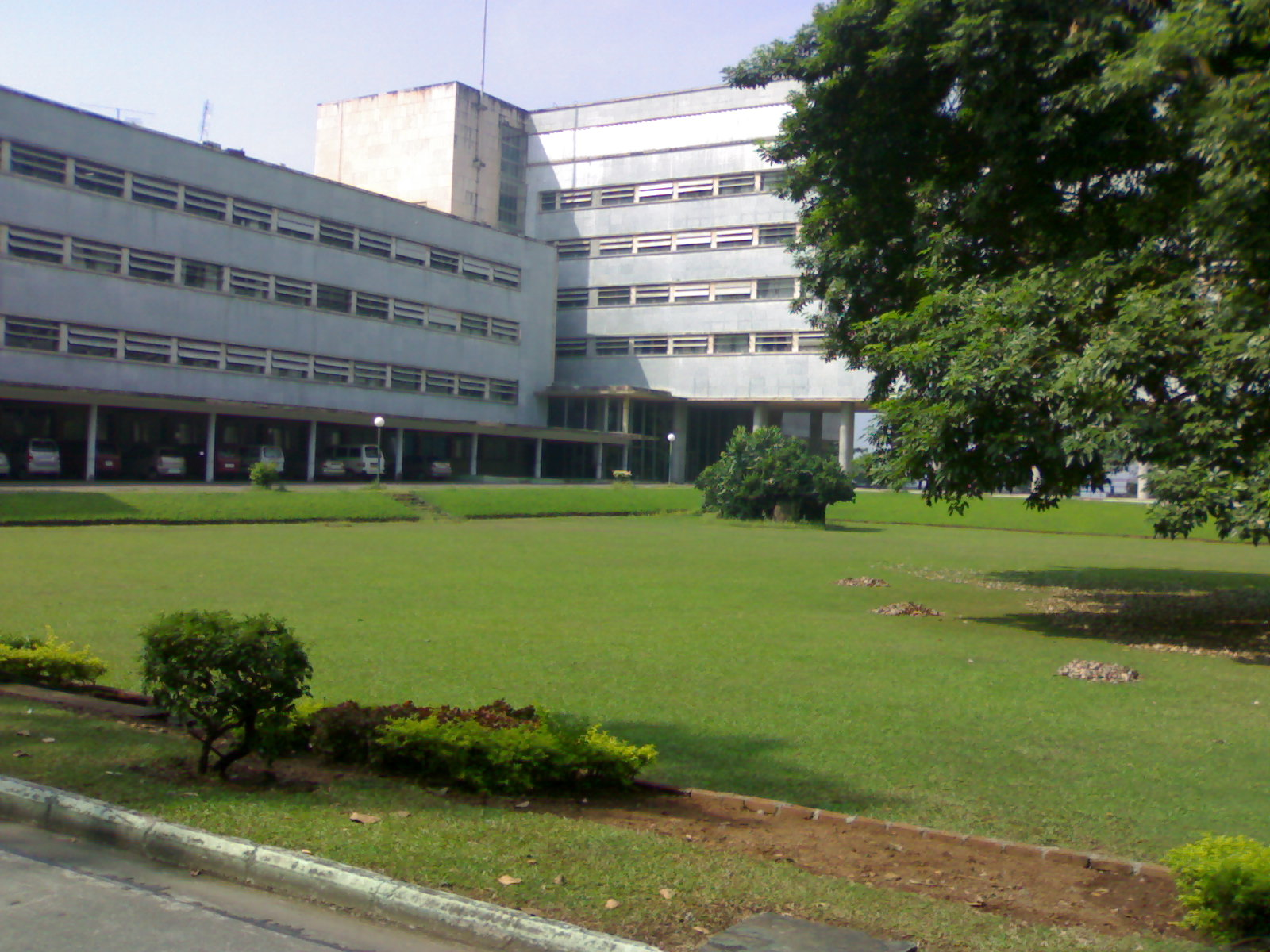
TIFR main campus

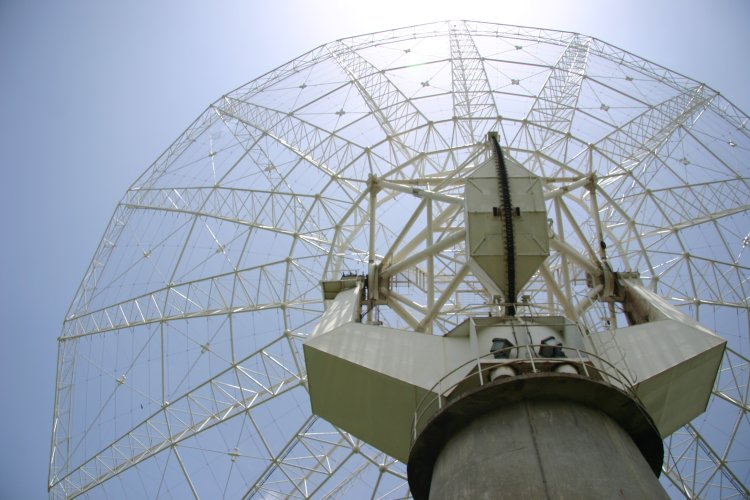
Giant Metrewave Radio Telescope, Pune

Born on 12 March 1948 in the National Capital Region of Delhi, Gopal Krishna completed his graduate studies at Agra University in 1966 before joining BARC Training School at Bhabha Atomic Research Centre. After a short stint, he moved to Tata Institute of Fundamental Research at their newly established Radio Astronomy Group in 1967 as a research associate. It was during this time, he was mentored by Govind Swarup and his research with the help of the Ooty Radio Telescope earned him a PhD from the University of Mumbai in 1977. Subsequently, he moved to the Max Planck Institute for Radio Astronomy for his post-doctoral work as an Alexander von Humboldt fellow and on his return in 1980, he resumed his career with Tata Institute Fundamental Research. In 2002, he moved to Pune to join National Centre for Radio Astrophysics where he was involved in the commissioning of Giant Metrewave Radio Telescope and holds the position of a senior professor there.

== Legacy ==
Gopal Krishna's research was focused on radio galaxies and quasars from observational and theoretical perspectives. He is known to have developed a relativistic-beam model which has reported use in ascertaining the luminosity of galaxies and quasars as well as in studying the cosmological evolution of linear sizes. Besides, he is also credited with the discovery of galaxies and clusters at high redshifts. His studies have been documented by way of a number of articles (Note: Please see Selected bibliography section) and the online article repository of the Indian Academy of Sciences has listed 102 of them. He has also guided a number of doctoral scholars in their research. Towards the latter part of his career, he served as a visiting faculty at several institutions including Space Telescope Science Institute, Baltimore, European Southern Observatory, Santiago and Max Planck Institute for Radio Astronomy. He sat in the International Advisory Committee of the International Year of Astronomy organized by the International Astronomical Union in 2009 and chaired the closing session of its UNESCO inaugural ceremony held in Paris in January 2009. He has also lectured worldwide and the lecture on Understanding X-shaped radio galaxies presented on 21 September 2010 at the University of Sheffield was one among them.

== Awards and honors ==
The Council of Scientific and Industrial Research awarded him the Shanti Swarup Bhatnagar Prize, one of the highest Indian science awards in 1993. The same year, he was elected as a fellow by the National Academy of Sciences, India. This was followed by the elected fellowships from the Indian Academy of Sciences in 1993 and the Indian National Science Academy 2010.

== Selected bibliography ==
- Gopal Krishna, Peter L. Biermann, Paul J. Wiita (2003). "The Origin of X-shaped Radio Galaxies: Clues from the Z-symmetric Secondary Lobes". The Astrophysical Journal. 594 (2): L103–L106. arXiv:astro-ph/0308059. Bibcode:2003ApJ...594L.103G. doi:10.1086/378766. S2CID 15314578.
- C. S. Stalin, Gopal-Krishna, Ram Sagar, Paul J. Wiita (2004). "Optical Variability Properties of High Luminosity AGN Classes". Journal of Astrophysics and Astronomy. 25 (1–2): 1–55. arXiv:astro-ph/0306395. Bibcode:2004JApA...25....1S. doi:10.1007/BF02702287. S2CID 2195960.
- Gopal-Krishna, Pronoy Sircar, Samir Dhurde (2007). "Kinematical Diagrams for Conical Relativistic Jets". Journal of Astrophysics and Astronomy. 28 (1): 29. Bibcode:2007JApA...28...29G. doi:10.1007/s12036-007-0004-8. S2CID 120572165.
- A. Goyal, Gopal-Krishna, P. J. Wiita, G. C. Anupama, D. K. Sahu, R. Sagar and S. Joshi (2012). "Intra-night optical variability of core dominated radio quasars: the role of optical polarization". Astronomy & Astrophysics. 544: A37. arXiv:1205.2324. Bibcode:2012A&A...544A..37G. doi:10.1051/0004-6361/201218888. S2CID 55586462.
- P. Kumar, Gopal-Krishna, C. S. Stalin, H. Chand, R. Srianand, P. Petitjean (2017). "Multi-epoch intranight optical monitoring of eight radio-quiet BL Lac candidates". Monthly Notices of the Royal Astronomical Society. 471 (1): 606. arXiv:1706.04438. Bibcode:2017MNRAS.471..606K. doi:10.1093/mnras/stx1450.

== See also ==
- Observational cosmology
