= Nissim Kanekar =

Indian astrophysicist, cosmologist and a professor

- Born: 11 September 1973 (age 53); Mumbai, Maharashtra, India
- Education: Ramnarain Ruia College; University of Mumbai; Savitribai Phule Pune University; Kapteyn Astronomical Institute; National Radio Astronomy Observatory
- Known for: Studies on the evolution of the electron proton mass ratio
- Awards: 2005 URSI Young Scientist Award; 2008 Astronomical Society of India Vainu Bappu Gold Medal; 2015 PRL Hari Om Prerit Vikram Sarabhai Award; 2017 Shanti Swarup Bhatnagar Prize; 2022 Infosys Prize in Physical Sciences
- Scientific career
- Fields: Astronomy
- Workplaces: National Centre for Radio Astrophysics

Nissim Kanekar (born 11 September 1973) is an Indian astrophysicist, cosmologist and a professor at National Centre for Radio Astrophysics of Tata Institute of Fundamental Research. Known for his research on the evolution of the electron proton mass ratio, Kanekar is a member of the International Astronomical Union and a recipient of Swarna Jayathi Fellowship of the Department of Science and Technology. The Council of Scientific and Industrial Research, the apex agency of the Government of India for scientific research, awarded him the Shanti Swarup Bhatnagar Prize for Science and Technology, one of the highest Indian science awards, for his contributions to physical sciences in 2017. (Note: Long link - please select award year to see details)

== Biography ==
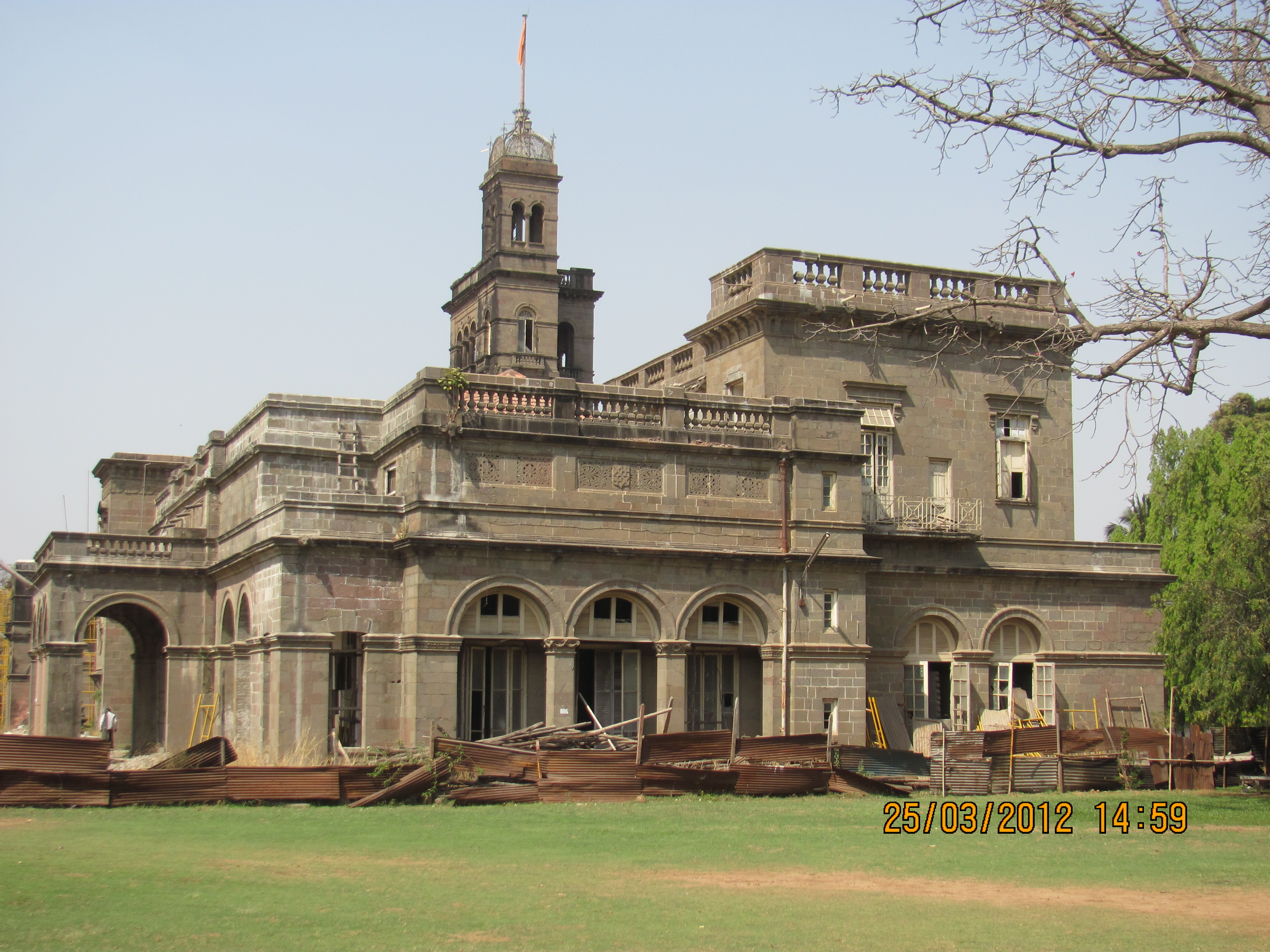
Savitribai Phule Pune University - Main Building

Nissim Kanekar, born on 11 September 1973 in Mumbai in the western Indian state of Maharashtra, did his undergraduate studies at Ramnarain Ruia College of Mumbai University and, after earning a graduate degree (BSc) in physics in 1991, moved to Savitribai Phule Pune University for his master's studies to obtain an MSc in 1995. He enrolled for his doctoral studies at the same institution and carrying out his research at National Centre for Radio Astrophysics, a research institute managed by Tata Institute of Fundamental Research, he secured a PhD in 2000. His post-doctoral work was at NCRA during 2000–01, at Kapteyn Institute of University of Groningen during 2002–04 under a NOVA fellowship and at the Socorro center of the National Radio Astronomy Observatory during 2004–08 holding Jansky and Max-Planck fellowships. In 2009, he joined NCRA as a reader in 2009 and has served as an associate professor since 2012.

== Legacy and honours ==
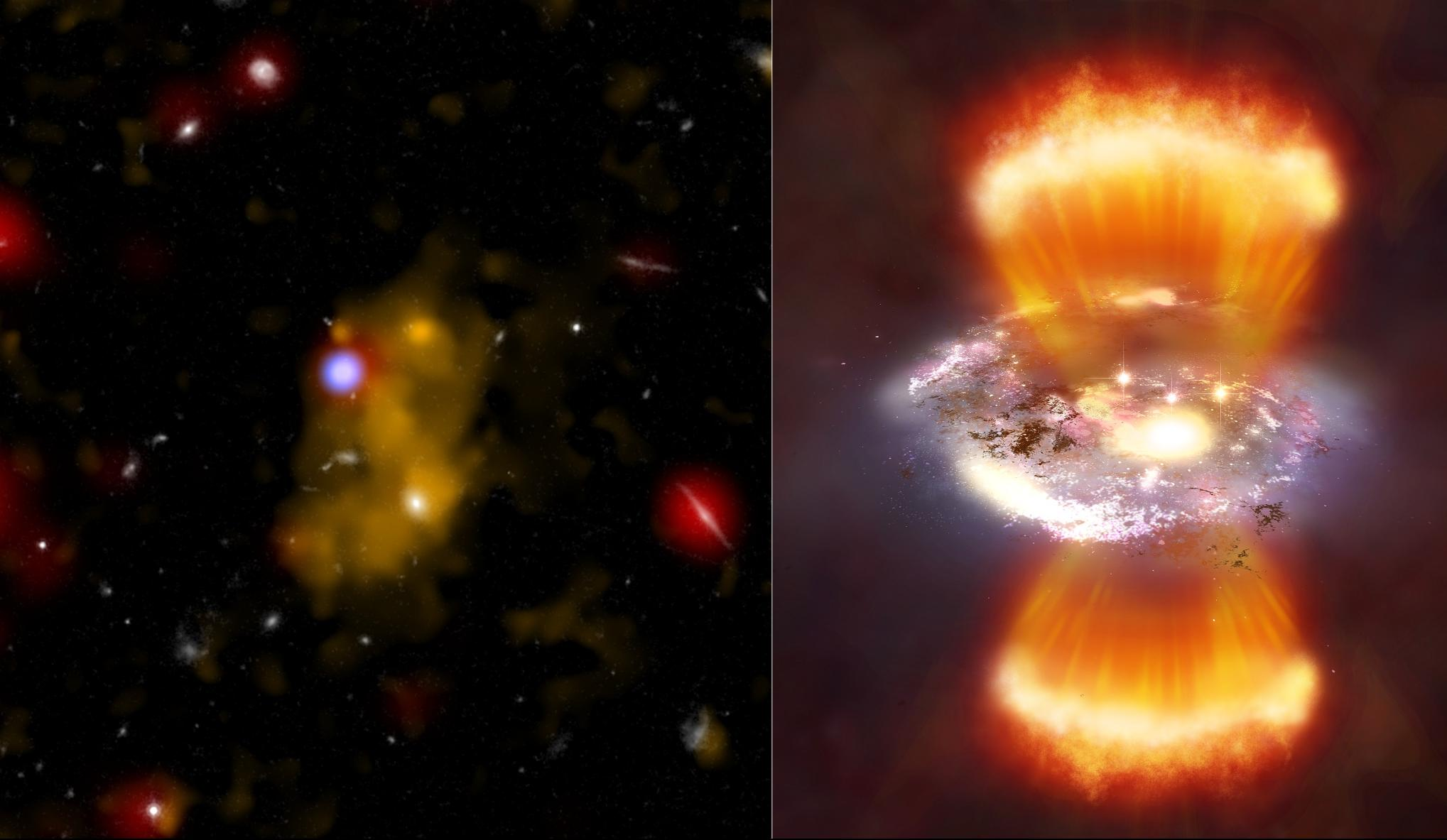
Lyman Alpha Blob

One of the principal contributions of Kanekar was the establishment of observational bounds for the study of the evolution of the electron proton mass ratio. He has also done reportedly notable work on the fine structure constant over cosmological time scales. He was one among the group of astronomers who observed a pair of distant Milky Way-like galaxies in early 2017 which has since been detailed in a paper published by the scientists. His studies have been documented by way of a number of articles and ResearchGate, an online article repository of scientific articles, has listed 115 of them. (Note: Please see Selected bibliography section) He has also delivered several lectures on astronomy which include a series of lectures delivered at Indian Institute of Science Education and Research, Mohali in 2014.

Kanekar received the URSI Young Scientist Award of the International Union of Radio Science in 2005 which he declined. Three years later, the Astronomical Society of India chose him, along with Niayesh Afshordi, for the 2008 Vainu Bappu Gold Medal and he became a Ramanujan Fellow of the Department of Science and Technology in 2009, the tenure of the fellowship running until 2014. In 2015, he shared the bi-annual Hari Om Prerit Vikram Sarabhai Award of the Physical Research Laboratory with Dibyendu Chakraborty; the same year, he was selected for the Swarna Jayanthi fellowship of the Department of Science and Technology. He has held various research fellowships, including Max Planck Fellowship (2007–09), Jansky Fellowship (2004–08), and NOVA Fellowship (2002–04) and he declined the Bolton Fellowship twice and ASTRON Fellowship once. The Council of Scientific and Industrial Research awarded Kanekar the Shanti Swarup Bhatnagar Prize, one of the highest Indian science awards in 2017. The lectureships held by him include the Delta Lecturership Award (2014) of the National Central University, Distinguished Visitorship (2005–06) of Australia Telescope National Facility and ESO Visiting Fellowship (2005) of the European Southern Observatory. He is also a member of the International Astronomical Union. In 2018 and 2023, he was a laureate of the Asian Scientist 100 by the Asian Scientist. In 2022, he was awarded the Infosys Prize in Physical Sciences for his study of galaxies in an era, the so-called “high noon” period, in which stars were being formed at a maximum rate. Separately, his careful astronomical investigations have placed the strongest limit on possible secular variation of the fine structure constant and the electron-to-proton mass ratio.

== Selected bibliography ==
- Nissim Kanekar (2011). "Constraining changes in the proton-electron mass ratio with inversion and rotational lines". Astrophysical Journal Letters. 728 (1): L12. arXiv:1101.4029. Bibcode:2011ApJ...728L..12K. doi:10.1088/2041-8205/728/1/L12. S2CID 119230502.
- Nirupam Roy, N. Kanekar, Robert Braun, Jayaram N. Chengalur (2013). "The temperature of the diffuse HI in the Milky Way I: High resolution HI 21 cm absorption studies". MNRAS. 436 (3): 2352–2365. arXiv:1309.4098. Bibcode:2013MNRAS.436.2352R. doi:10.1093/mnras/stt1743. S2CID 119222770.
- Nissim Kanekar (2016). "First Connection between Cold Gas in Emission and Absorption: CO Emission from a Galaxy-Quasar Pair". Astrophysical Journal Letters. 820 (2): L39. arXiv:1604.05720. Bibcode:2016ApJ...820L..39N. doi:10.3847/2041-8205/820/2/L39. S2CID 119075508.

== See also ==
- Yashwant Gupta - NCRA
