= Vijay Kumar Kapahi =

Indian astrophysicist (1944–1999)

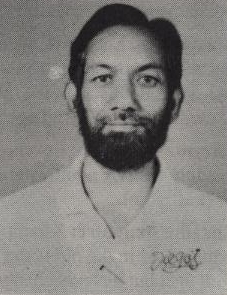
- Born: 21 January 1944; Quetta, British Balochistan
- Died: 16 March 1999 (aged 55); Mumbai, Maharashtra, India
- Education: St. Joseph's College, Bangalore; Tata Institute of Fundamental Research; Bombay University
- Known for: Studies on radio galaxies, quasars and observational cosmology
- Awards: 1987 Shanti Swarup Bhatnagar Prize; 1987 Vikram Sarabhai Research Award; 1991 AAS Henri Chretien Research Grant Award
- Scientific career
- Fields: Astrophysics; Radio astronomy
- Workplaces: National Centre for Radio Astrophysics
- Doctoral advisor: Govind Swarup, FRS
- Doctoral students: Prajval Shastri, Ramana Athreya

Vijay Kumar Kapahi (21 January 1944 – 16 March 1999) was an Indian astrophysicist and the director of the National Centre for Radio Astrophysics, an autonomous division of Tata Institute of Fundamental Research. Known for his research on radio galaxies, quasars and observational cosmology, Kapahi was an elected fellow of all the three major Indian science academies – Indian Academy of Sciences, Indian National Science Academy and National Academy of Sciences, India – as well as of the Maharashtra Academy of Sciences. The Council of Scientific and Industrial Research, the apex agency of the Government of India for scientific research, awarded him the Shanti Swarup Bhatnagar Prize for Science and Technology for his contributions to physical sciences in 1987. (Note: Long link – please select award year to see details)

== Biography ==
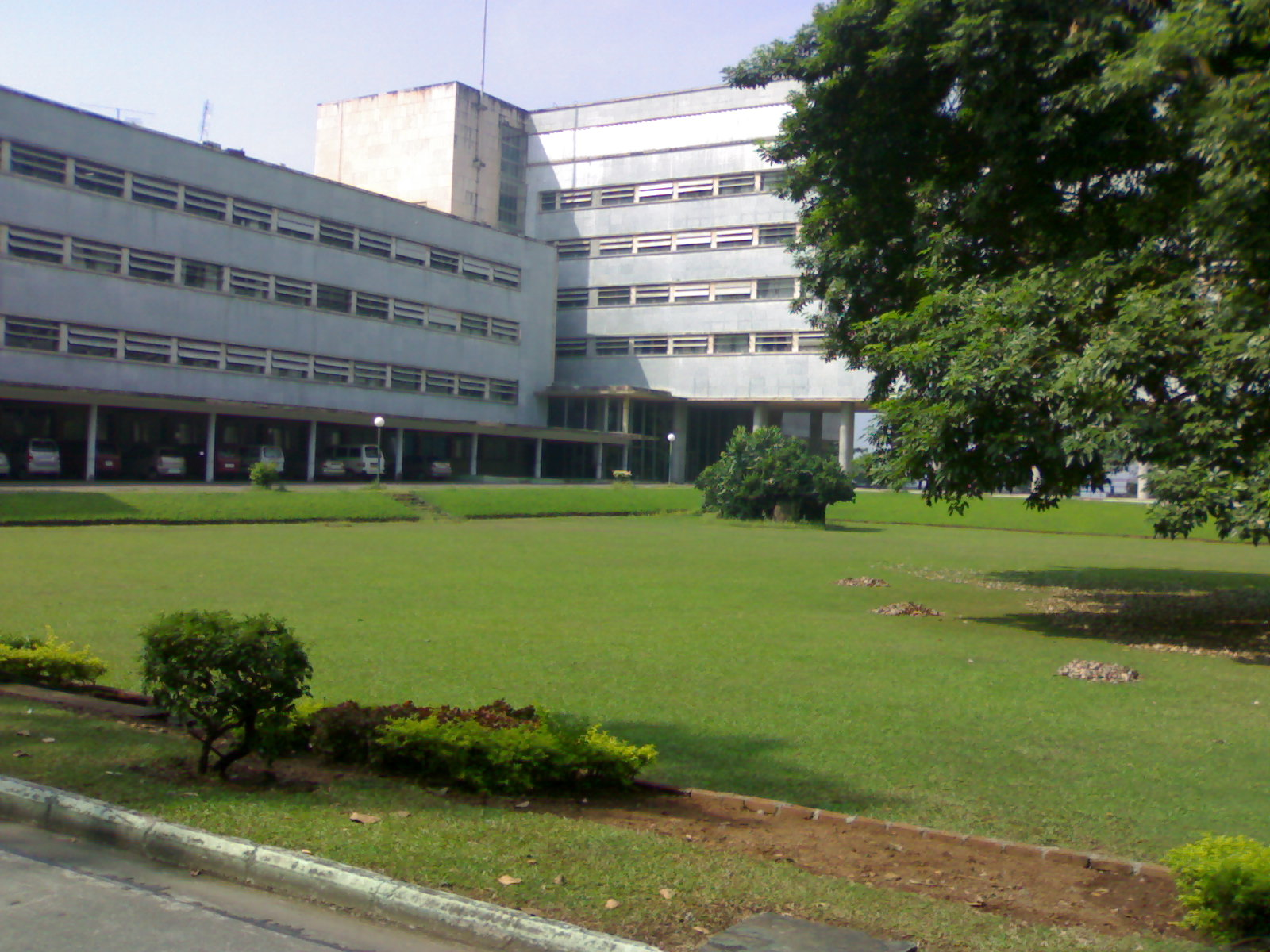
Tata Institute of Fundamental Research

Vijay Kumar Kapahi was born on 21 January 1944 at Quetta in British India. (Note: Presently in Balochistan, Pakistan) His pre-graduate and graduate studies were completed at St. Joseph's College, Bangalore (then under Mysore University) in 1959 and 1962 respectively before his move to Mumbai where he did a one-year course at BARC Training School. In 1963, he joined the Radio Astronomy Group of Tata Institute of Fundamental Research (TIFR) and this gave him the opportunity to work with Govind Swarup, who would later design the Ooty Radio Telescope. During his service at TIFR, he simultaneously pursued his doctoral studies mentored by Swarup and secured a PhD from Bombay University in 1975 for his thesis, Angular structures of extragalactic radio sources and cosmology. The Radio Astronomy Group meanwhile developed into an autonomous division of TIFR, with a new name, National Centre for Radio Astrophysics, and he served as the director of the institution since 1994. He was holding the position and simultaneously serving as a professor at TIFR at the time of his death at the age of 55 on 16 March 1999. In between., he also served as a visiting scientist at Carnegie Institution for Science, Jet Propulsion Laboratory and Dwingeloo Radio Observatory.

== Legacy ==
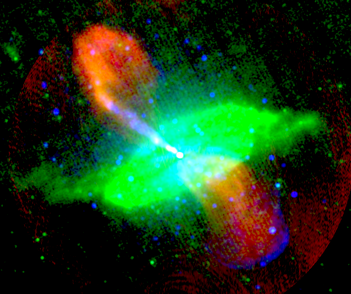
False-colour image of the nearby radio galaxy Centaurus A.

Kapahi's work was mainly focused on observational cosmology and his work covered the studies of radio galaxies and quasars. During his doctoral studies under the guidance of Govind Swarup, together they developed an imaging technique for capturing rapid images of solar radio bursts and the details were published by way of an article, A simple image forming technique suitable for multifrequency observations of solar radio bursts in Solar Physics journal in 1970. Through his studies with the help of Ooty Radio Telescope, he discovered for the first time in 1975 that radio galaxies were smaller in linear sizes during earlier cosmic epochs. He was one of the first astronomers to study Compact Steep‐Spectrum radio sources and he published a series of articles on the subject during 1981–98. These studies assisted in the later-day development of a paradigm known as unifying scheme of radio galaxies and quasers which explained the relativistic beaming in nuclear jets of quasars and in integrating the properties of lobe-dominated and core-dominated types of quasars. His work with Very-long-baseline interferometry telescopes helped discover hot spots on the twin-lobes of extragalactic radio sources as well as distant radio galaxies. His studies have been documented by way of a number of articles (Note: Please see Selected bibliography section) and ResearchGate, an online article repository of scientific articles, has listed 101 of them. Besides, he edited five books including Quasars: proceedings of the 119th Symposium of the International Astronomical Union, Lectures on Observational Cosmology, Proceedings of the Workshop Diffuse Thermal and Relativistic Plasma in Galaxy Clusters and Asian-Pacific Astronomy: Proceedings of the 6th Asian- Pacific Regional Meeting on Astronomy of the International Astronomical Union. He also contributed chapters to books published by others and his work has drawn citations from other scientists.

Kapahi was directly involved in the establishment of the Ooty Radio Telescope, especially in the development of phase-shifter array. Later, he was involved in the development and establishment of Giant Metrewave Radio Telescope near Pune which was the core theme of two of his articles published in 1991 and 1995 respectively. His contributions were reported in the initiation of the Joint Astronomy Programme of the Indian Institute of Science and he was associated with the Astronomical Society of India which he presided from 1997 until his death in 1999. He was also a member of the Indian Physics Association and International Astronomical Union and the doctoral scholars mentored by him included Joydeep Bagchi, Dhruba Jyoti Saikia, Prajval Shastri, C. H. Ishwar-Chandra and Ramana Athreya.

== Awards and honors ==
The Council of Scientific and Industrial Research awarded Kapahi the Shanti Swarup Bhatnagar Prize in 1987. He received two more honors in 1987; the Physical Research Laboratory selected him for Hari Om Ashram Prerit Vikram Sarabhai Research Award and the Indian Academy of Sciences elected him as their fellow. He received the Henri Chretien Research Grant Award of the American Astronomical Society in 1991 and became an elected fellow of the Indian National Science Academy in 1997. He was also an elected fellow of the National Academy of Sciences, India and the Maharashtra Academy of Sciences.

== Selected bibliography ==
=== Books ===
- Dennis William Sciama; V. K. Kapahi; S. Ramadurai (1967). Lectures on Observational Cosmology. Tata Institute of Fundamental Research. Bibcode:1967looc.book.....S.
- International Astronomical Union. Symposium; Govind Swarup; V. K. Kapahi (1986). Quasars: proceedings of the 119th Symposium of the International Astronomical Union, held in Bangalore, India, December 2–6, 1985. D. Reidel Pub. Co. ISBN 978-90-277-2297-3.
- V. K. Kapahi (1995). Asian-Pacific Astronomy: Proceedings of the 6th Asian- Pacific Regional Meeting on Astronomy of the International Astronomical Union. Indian Academy of Sciences.
- V. K. Kapahi (1999). Proceedings of the Workshop Diffuse Thermal and Relativistic Plasma in Galaxy Clusters: Ringberg Castle, Germany, April 19–23, 1999. Max-Planck-Institut für extraterrestrische Physik.

=== Chapters ===
- Katsuhiko Sato (31 January 1999). Cosmological Parameters and the Evolution of the Universe. Springer Science & Business Media. pp. 251–. ISBN 978-0-7923-5459-8.
- Adelaide Hewitt; Geoffrey Burbidge; Li Zhi Fang (6 December 2012). Observational Cosmology: Proceedings of the 124th Symposium of the International Astronomical Union, Held in Beijing, China, August 25–30, 1986. Springer Science & Business Media. pp. 264–. ISBN 978-94-009-3853-3.
- R. Ekers; C. Fanti; L. Padrielli (6 December 2012). Extragalactic Radio Sources: Proceedings of the 175th Symposium of the International Astronomical Union, Held in Bologna, Italy 10–14 October 1995. Springer Science & Business Media. pp. 394–. ISBN 978-94-009-0295-4.

=== Articles ===
- G. Swarup, V. K. Kapahi, J. D. Isloor, R. P. Sinha (1966). "Radio Observations of the Quiet Sun at 49 cm". Nature. 212 (5065): 910–911. Bibcode:1966Natur.212..910S. doi:10.1038/212910a0. S2CID 34431061.
- G. SwarupV. K. Kapahi (1970). "A simple image forming technique suitable for multifrequency observations of solar radio bursts". Solar Physics. 14 (2): 404–413. Bibcode:1970SoPh...14..404S. doi:10.1007/BF00221326. S2CID 121226985.
- V. K. Kapahi, D. G. Banhatti (1983). "The V/Vm test for a sample of compact steepspectrum sources". arXiv:0708.1152.
- G. Swarup, S. Ananthakrishnan, V. K. Kapahi, A. P. Rao, C. R. Subrahmanya, V. K. Kulkarni (1991). "Giant Metrewave Radio Telescope" (PDF). Current Science. 60 (2): 95–105.
- V. K. Kapahi, S. Ananthakrishnan (1995). "Astronomy with the Giant Metrewave Radio Telescope" (PDF). Bulletin of Astronomical Society of India. 23: 265–268.

== See also ==
- Chronology of the universe
- Phased array
