= Yashwant Gupta =

Indian astrophysicist (born 1962)

- Born: 1 November 1962 (age 63); Kharagpur, India
- Education: IIT Kanpur and University of California San Diego
- Known for: Studies on Pulsars and radio astronomy instrumentation
- Awards: Shanti Swarup Bhatnagar Prize (2007), Murli M. Chugani Memorial Award (2022), Distinguished Alumnus Award of IIT Kanpur (2023)
- Scientific career
- Fields: Radio astronomy
- Workplaces: National Centre for Radio Astrophysics
- Doctoral advisor: Prof. B. J. Rickett

Yashwant Gupta (born 1 November 1962) is an Indian astrophysicist and a professor at the National Centre for Radio Astrophysics (NCRA) of the Tata Institute of Fundamental Research. He is currently a Distinguished Professor and also the Centre Director at NCRA.

Known for his research on pulsars and the interstellar medium, as well as development of instrumentation for radio astronomy, Gupta is a member of the International Astronomical Union, the International Union of Radio Science (URSI) and also a Senior Member of the IEEE. He is reported to have contributed to the construction and commissioning of the Giant Metrewave Radio Telescope (GMRT) in Pune, including the development and enhancements to the digital correlator for the GMRT. He also led the major upgrade of GMRT that was carried out during 2013 to 2019, which has resulted in the GMRT maintaining its position as one of the leading low frequency radio observatories in the world. For this achievement, Gupta and his team were awarded the Zubin Kembhavi Award in 2019 by the Astronomical Society of India.

His studies have been documented by way of a number of articles (Note: Please see Selected bibliography section) and Google Scholar, an online repository of scientific articles has listed 165 of them. He has also delivered several plenary speeches or keynote addresses and the speech on The upgraded GMRT : Current Status and Future Prospects at the University of California, Berkeley in December 2015 was one among them. The Council of Scientific and Industrial Research, the apex agency of the Government of India for scientific research, awarded him the Shanti Swarup Bhatnagar Prize for Science and Technology, one of the highest Indian science awards, for his contributions to physical sciences in 2007. (Note: Long link - please select award year to see details). He has also been awarded the Murli M. Chugani Memorial Award for Excellence in Applied Physics by the Indian Physics Association in 2022, and the Distinguished Alumnus Award of his alma mater the Indian Institute of Technology Kanpur in 2023.

He has been elected a Fellow of the Indian Academy of Sciences (IAS), the National Academy of Sciences of India (NASI), the Indian National Science Academy (INSA) and also the Indian National Academy of Engineering (INAE).

== Selected bibliography ==
- Yashwant Gupta; et al. (2017). "The upgraded GMRT : opening new windows on the radio Universe". Current Science. 113 (1): 707. Bibcode:2017CSci..113..707G. doi:10.18520/cs/v113/i04/707-714.
- Richard Strom, Peng Bo, Mark Walker, Nan Rendong (Editors); N. D. Rames Bhatt, Yashwant Gupta, A. Pramesh Rao, P. B. Preethi (Chapter authors) (27 June 2011). "Interstellar Scintillation Studies of Pulsars and Distribution of Scattering Plasma in the Local Interstellar Medium". Sources and Scintillations: Refraction and Scattering in Radio Astronomy IAU Colloquium 182. Springer Science & Business Media. pp. 171–. ISBN 978-94-010-1001-6.
- Alvaro Gimenez (Editor); N. D. Rames Bhatt, Yashwant Gupta, A. Pramesh Rao (Chapter authors) (6 December 2012). "Pulsar Observations and the Structure of Local Ism". Science with Minisat 01. Springer Science & Business Media. pp. 227–. ISBN 978-94-010-0686-6.
- Kishalay De, Yashwant Gupta, Prateek Sharma (2016). "Detection of Polarized Quasi-periodic Microstructure Emission in Millisecond Pulsars". The Astrophysical Journal Letters. 833 (1): L10. arXiv:1611.07330. Bibcode:2016ApJ...833L..10D. doi:10.3847/2041-8213/833/1/L10. S2CID 1982852.

== See also ==
- Electromagnetic radiation
- Neutron star
