= 2MASX J10222849+5006200 =

Type-cD elliptical galaxy in the constellation of Ursa Major

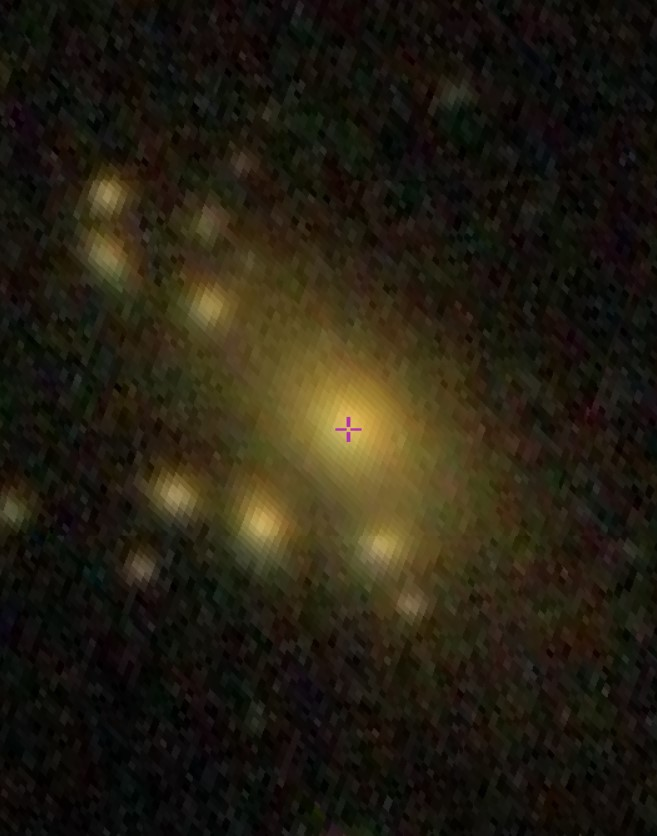
- 2MASX J10222849+5006200 captured by SDSS

Observation data (J2000.0 epoch)
- Constellation: Ursa Major
- Right ascension: 10^{h} 22^{m} 28.44^{s}
- Declination: +50° 06′ 19.83″
- Redshift: 0.158413
- Heliocentric radial velocity: 47,491 km/s
- Distance: 2,286.5 ± 160.1 Mly (701.03 ± 49.08 Mpc)
- Group or cluster: Abell 980
- magnitude (J): 13.4

Characteristics
- Type: BrCLG
- Size: ~658,000 ly (201.7 kpc) (estimated)
- Notable features: Oldest fossil radio galaxy containing double radio lobes

Other designations
- OGC 286, LEDA 2362940, NVSS J102228+500620, SDSS J102228.44+500619.8, CXOGSG J102228.4+500619, RX J1022.4+5006:[ZEH2003]

2MASX J10222849+5006200 also known as LEDA 2362940, is a massive Type-cD elliptical galaxy located in the constellation of Ursa Major. With the redshift of 0.15, the galaxy is located 2.4 billion light-years away from Earth. With a diameter of almost 660,000 light-years across, it is one of the largest galaxies known.

An optically bright galaxy, 2MASX J10222849+5006200 is the brightest cluster galaxy (BCG) inside the galaxy cluster, Abell 980. The cluster is located at z = 0.1582, and is X-ray luminous (L_{X} = 7.1 × 10^{44} erg s^{−1}), containing a mild intracluster medium temperature of 7.1 keV.

2MASX J10222849+5006200 is classified a low-excitation radio galaxy with a 1.4 GHz luminosity range between 2 × 10^{23} and 3 × 10^{25} W Hz^{−1}. It has an ellipsoidal stellar halo measuring ~80 kpc with two diffuse ultra-steep spectrum radio sources around the galaxy, extending about ~100 kpc.

In August 2022, this galaxy became a subject of interest. Indian astronomers from Savitribai Phule Pune University noticed a burst of radio jet activity, from its central black hole. Led by Surajit Paul, he mentioned the first pair of radio lobes discovered are the oldest he and the astronomers had seen. They also detected diffuse radio structures formed 260 million years ago and 1.2 million years in length when using the Giant Meterwave Radio Telescope.

Following the primary pair of radio lobes to 2MASX J10222849+5006200, another team of astronomers led by Gopal-Krishna, found the galaxy has drifted to the central region of the cluster by 250,000 light-years from its original position. Here, the galaxy erupted again by going through a new active phrase; it created another set of radio lobes, this time younger. Because both the old and young radio lobes lost their collinearity when their parent galaxy moved, this created a 'Detached-Double-Double Radio Galaxy' (dDDRG) system.
