= Khodad =

- Town
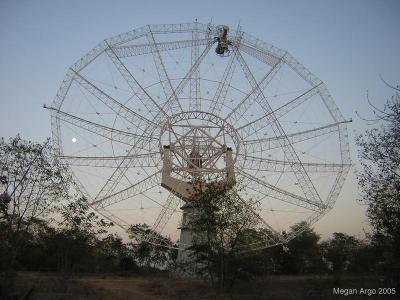
- Giant Metrewave Radio Telescope (GMRT) near Narayangaon

- Location in Maharashtra, India
- Coordinates: 19°07′00″N 73°55′00″E
- Country: India
- State: Maharashtra
- District: Pune
- Taluka: Junnar
- Elevation: 656 m (2,152 ft)

Languages
  - Official: Marathi
- Time zone: UTC+5:30 (IST)
- PIN: 410504
- Telephone code: 91-2132-XXXXXX
- Vehicle registration: MH-14

Khodad is a town in the Pune district of Maharashtra state, India. Khodad Village is situated in Junner taluka of Pune district of Maharashtra state, India. It is famous for Giant Metrewave Radio Telescope (GMRT), the largest telescope at metre wavelengths in the world, which attracts radio astronomers from different countries. Khodad is located on Junner & Ambegao taluka border. Khodad is surrounded by Junnar Taluka towards west, Khed Taluka towards South, Parner & Ambegaon Taluka towards East, Shirur Taluka towards North.

== Location ==
Village is at 9 Kilometer from Narayangaon, which is one of the most important town in Pune District. Location of Khodad is on East of Narayangao towards Ambegao taluka. Situated at 87 km from pune on Pune Nashik highway. this region belongs to Desh or Paschim Maharashtra region. It fallows under Pune Division. It is at 26 km from Junnar, taluka headquarters. 5 170 km from Mumbai State capital of Maharashtra.4 Jadhavwadi (3 km), Thorandale (5 km), Ranjani (5 km), Walati (6 km), Bhorwadi (2 km), Nagapur (7 km) are the nearby villages to Khodad. Manchar, Junnar, Shirur, Talegaon Dabhade are the nearby Cities to Khodad. Village is situated at bank of Meena River. There is pyramid Shape Mountain at East of Khodad towards Parner taluka end. Local people call it as Khodad che Pathar (plateau of Khodad) Manjarwadi is located at 5 km West from Khodad. On South on the opposite side of Meena River there is hermitage of Mahanubhav panth. Narayangad is located at 5 kilometer North of Khodad. It is believed that Narayangao got its name from this fort. The fort is from the Satvahan dynasty and was used as a watch point for the Junnar Paithan route. According to Census 2011 information the location code or village code of Khodad village is 555388. Khodad village is located in Junnar Tehsil of Pune district in Maharashtra, India. It is situated 26km away from sub-district headquarter Junnar and 75km away from district headquarter Pune. As per 2009 stats, Khodad village is also a gram panchayat.

The total geographical area of village is 2855 hectares. Khodad has a total population of 4,188 peoples. There are about 920 houses in Khodad village. Junnar is nearest town to Khodad which is approximately 26km away.

== Inhabitants ==
The population of Khodad is around 4500 to 5000. Marathi is the main language of majority of the people. Hindi & Urdu is also used by minority people. Khodad is divided roughly on the basis of people living in that particular vicinity. Main Village, Mule mala, Gakiwad mala, Ghangale Mala, Kharmale Mala, Erande mala near Datta temple in Erande mala 5-6 boys in the army, are some of the main parts (mala in local language) of Village base upon the Surname of people live in that area. The majority of the population is Hindu but there are quite considerable numbers of Muslim Families in Khodad engage in their Family business like Kasar, Mutton Shop or Small shop in Village market area.

There are few temples in Village. Goddess Mukktai is gramadaivata of Khodad any every year Ram Navami the main yatra of the village welcome to everybody during the yatra. There is small Darga exactly opposite of Temple. Which is considered as sigh of brotherhood among Hindu Muslim population of village. There are two Hanuman Temples each at South & North extreme of Village boundaries. Also there are two more Temples of Vithoba Rakumai & Shiva right on the bank of Meena river. New Temple of God Ram near vipul pokharkar house.

=== Occupation ===
Agriculture is main occupation of population. Some members from Farmer family got the job in GMRT as compensation of land acquired by government for GMRT project. Those families who had lost their land under GMRT project in 1984 had been awarded with one job post at GMRT as 2ndry level employees. Most of the young generation had shifted to Mumbai or other big cities in Maharashtra for Jobs & business. There are some family business in Khodad which include Carpenter, Gavandi, Kasar, Vani etc.

==== Agriculture ====
There are two seasons of cropping Kharif & Rabi. Wheat, Groundnut, Sugarcane, Potato, Onions, Bajari are some of the main crops in khodad. But farmers in village are taking up the new way farming to yield non traditional crops like Tomato, Cabbage.

== Weather ==
Khodad observe three main climate seasons Summer, Winter and Monsoon. Highest temperature is mostly recorded in month of April. Pre monsoon rain arrives in last week of May. Monsoon rains hit the village at start of June. It have average rain fall around 700 mm. Heavy rain affect the daily routines of villagers very frequently. Season of winter starts in November and it continue until February. Sharp fall in temperature is indicator of arrival of winter. Day temperature varies between 25 and 10 Celsius. Nights are more cooler as compared to day time. Some time temperature falls till 4 to 5 Celsius.

== Tourism ==
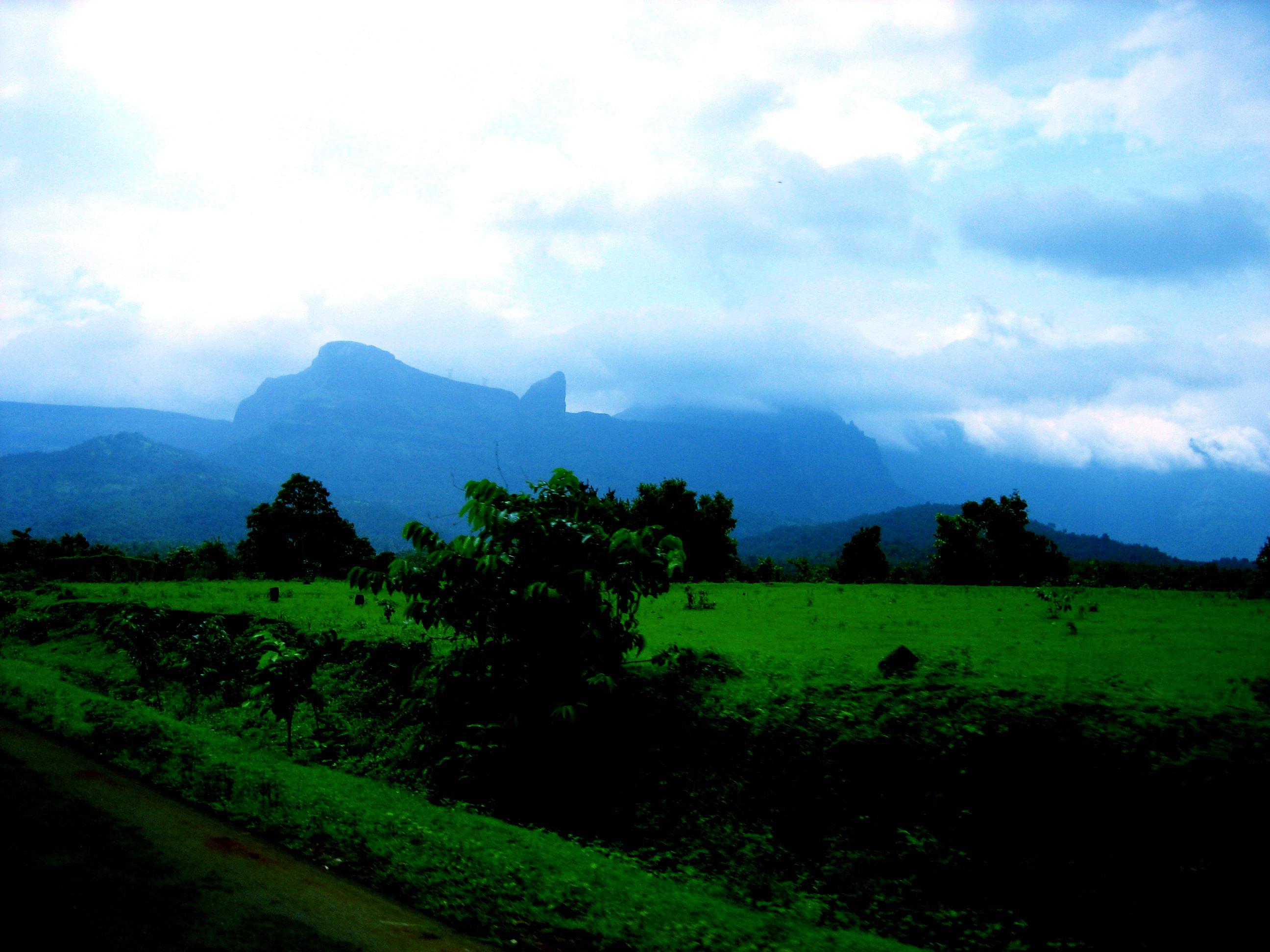
View of Malshej Hills

Junnar taluka is noted for the presence of 27 leopards in a 500sq m area. Leopard Rehabilitation Center in Manikdoh, around 25 km west to the Narayangaon is becoming major tourist attraction ever since its establishment. Malshej Ghat a famous tourist destination in the western ghats is at a 45 minutes drive away.

=== GMRT ===
GMRT is operated by the National Centre for Radio Astrophysics, a part of the Tata Institute of Fundamental Research, Mumbai. At the time it was built, it was world's largest interferometric array. And that was the time when first Khodad came on world map.

The Site of Giant Metrewave Radio Telescope (GMRT) about 10 km east of Narayangaon town on the Pune-Nasik highway & at 2 km from Nearest village Khodad. This site was selected by National Center for Radio Astrophysics after an extensive search in many parts of India. After considering several important criteria Khodad was selected for establishing this project as a part of the Tata Institute of Fundamental Research program. low man-made radio noise, availability of good communication, vicinity of industrial, educational and other infrastructure and a geographical latitude sufficiently north of the geomagnetic equator in order to have a reasonably quiet ionosphere which will be helpful to observe a good part of the southern part of sky are some of the criteria which are taken into consideration while making final decision. It took 10 years to build this project after first proposal in 1984. TIFR professor Govind Swarup conceived and directed the design and construction of the Giant Metrewave Radio Telescope (GMRT), consisting of 30 fully steerable parabolic dishes of 45m diameter that are located in a Y-shape array of about 25 km in extent 8 around the Khodad.

=== Forts ===
The famous Maratha Emperor Shivaji was born on Shivneri Fort, 16 km west to the Narayangoan. Shivneri fort is one of the most famous historic place in Maharashtra (India). The Narayangad fort is about 8 km north-east to the Narayangaon from which it is believed that town got its name.

Ganpirya, Chawand, Nimgiri, Dhakoba, Hadsar, Jivdhan, Harishchandra are some of the forts nearby and some of which have become great attraction for trekking.
