= Alaknanda Galaxy =

Newly discovered spiral galaxy

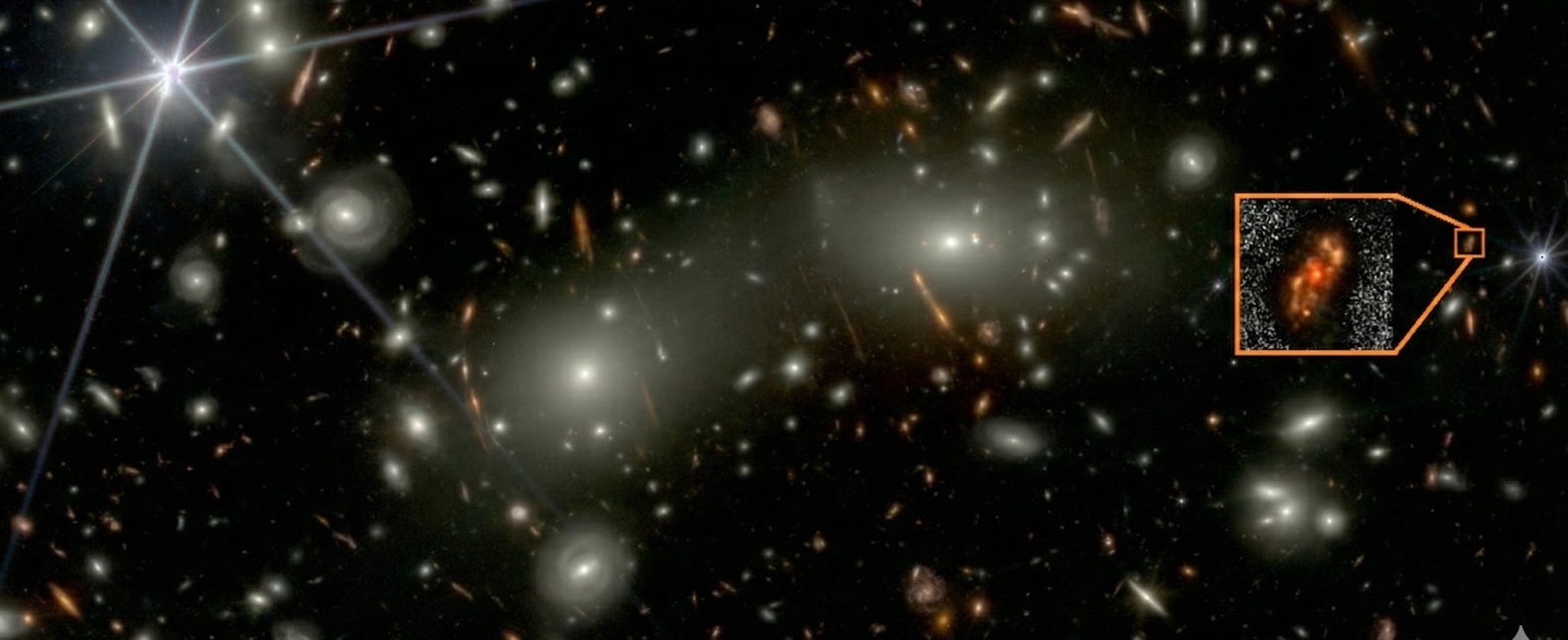
- Abell 2744 galaxy cluster imaged by James Webb, Alaknanda galaxy can be seen in the right side of the image

Observation data
- Constellation: Sculptor
- Right ascension: 00^{h} 14^{m} 05.68^{s}
- Declination: −30° 22′ 20.67″
- Redshift: 4.05
- Distance: 12 billion light years (light travel distance)

Characteristics
- Type: Spiral galaxy
- Mass: 1.58×10^{10} M_{☉}
- Number of stars: 10 billion
- Size: ~10 kpc (33,000 ly)

Other designations
- UNCOVER DR3 ID 42812
- References: Astronomy and Astrophysics

The Alaknanda Galaxy (designated as UNCOVER DR3 ID 42812) is a spiral galaxy about 12 billion light years away, in the constellation Sculptor. It was discovered in 2025 with NASA's James Webb Space Telescope (JWST). It was discovered by two Indian astronomers Rashi Jain and Yogesh Wadadekar from the National Centre for Radio Astrophysics. It has been estimated that the large spiral galaxy existed just 1.5 billion years after the Big Bang. The discovery of the Alaknanda Galaxy was published in Astronomy and Astrophysics in November 2025.

== Etymology ==
The spiral galaxy was named after the Himalayan river Alaknanda in the Indian subcontinent.

== Discovery ==
The Alaknanda Galaxy was discovered by Rashi Jain and Yogesh Wadadekar while studying the JWST images of the galaxy taken through 21 different filters of the JWST's astronomical telescope. While studying the images, they spotted a galaxy remarkably similar to Milky Way galaxy. They estimated that the spotted galaxy was formed apparently when the universe was 1.5 billion years old after the Big Bang. The discovery was published in the journal Astronomy and Astrophysics.

== Location and structure ==
The Alaknanda Galaxy lies behind the massive galaxy cluster Abell 2744. The structure of the galaxy is spiral. It has two sweeping spiral arms wrapped around a bright and round central bulge spanning 10 kpc (0.033 Mly) across.

There are about 10 billion stars in the Alaknanda Galaxy. The galaxy is actively forming new stars, at a rate of approximately 60 M_{☉}/year. The stellar mass of the galaxy is 1.58×10^{10} M_{☉}.

== Characteristics of galaxy ==
The star formation rate in the Alaknanda Galaxy is about 20 times that of the Milky Way. It has been estimated that the half of the appeared stars in the Alaknanda Galaxy were formed in only 200 million years.

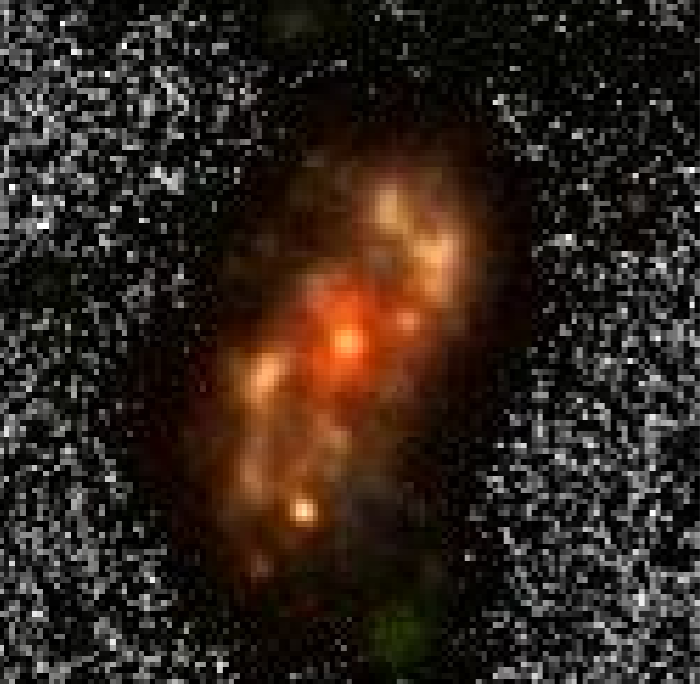
Alaknanda galaxy imaged by JWST's NIRCam instrument

== See also ==
- Indian astronomy
- List of spiral galaxies
