= National Centre for Radio Astrophysics =

Radio astronomy research institute in Pune, India

Coordinates: 19.10000°N 74.05000°E

- Type: Research Institution Astrophysics
- Affiliations: Tata Institute of Fundamental Research; Department of Atomic Energy, Govt. of India
- Director: Yashwant Gupta
- Location: Pune University Campus, Ganeshkhind, Pune, Maharashtra - 411007, India (Map)
- Campus: Urban
- Website: www.ncra.tifr.res.in

The National Centre for Radio Astrophysics (NCRA; Hindi: राष्ट्रीय रेडियो खगोल भौतिकी केन्द्र) is an international research institution in India in the field of radio astronomy is located in the Pune University Campus (just beside IUCAA), is part of the Tata Institute of Fundamental Research, Mumbai, India. NCRA has an active research program in many areas of Astronomy and Astrophysics, which includes studies of the Sun, Interplanetary scintillations, pulsars, the Interstellar medium, Active galaxies and cosmology and particularly in the specialized field of Radio Astronomy and Radio instrumentation. NCRA also provides exciting opportunities and challenges in engineering fields such as analog and digital electronics, signal processing, antenna design, telecommunication and software development.

NCRA has set up the Giant Metrewave Radio Telescope (GMRT), the world's largest telescope operating at meter wavelengths located at Khodad, 80 km from Pune. NCRA also operates the Ooty Radio Telescope (ORT), which is a large Cylindrical Telescope located near Udhagamandalam, India.

== History ==
The Centre has its roots in the Radio Astronomy Group of TIFR, set up in the early 1960s under the leadership of Govind Swarup. The group designed and built the Ooty Radio Telescope. In the early 80's an ambitious plan for a new telescope was proposed - the Giant Metrewave Radio Telescope. Since the site chosen for this new telescope was close to Pune, a new home for the group was built in the scenic campus of Pune University. The radio astronomy group morphed into the National Centre for Radio Astrophysics around this time.

== Research ==
The National Centre for Radio Astrophysics of the Tata Institute of Fundamental Research (NCRA-TIFR) is a institute for radio astronomy in India. Research activities at NCRA-TIFR are centered on low frequency radio astronomy, with research in a wide range of areas, including solar physics, pulsars, active galactic nuclei, the interstellar medium, supernova remnants, the Galactic Center, nearby galaxies, high-redshift galaxies, Fundamental Constant Evolution, and the epoch of reionization. NCRA-TIFR has built and operates the largest steerable radio telescope in the world, the Giant Metrewave Radio Telescope, as well as the Ooty Radio Telescope, and work at the frontiers of astronomy and astrophysics, as well as in instrumentation development.

In April 2019, scientists of the NCRA led by Divya Oberoi published few of the deepest radio images of the sun. In 2025, two physicists Rashi Jain and Yogesh Wadadekar of the institute published a research paper on the discovery of the Alaknanda Galaxy.

== Research facilities ==
Research facilities of NCRA includes a well-furnished Library both at NCRA and GMRT, Computing Facilities, Radio Physics Laboratory(A joint initiative of NCRA-TIFR and IUCAA) and above all two radio telescopes GMRT and ORT.

=== Giant Metrewave Radio Telescope (GMRT) ===
NCRA has set up a facility for radio astronomical research using the metrewavelengths range of the radio spectrum, known as the Giant Metrewave Radio Telescope (GMRT). It is located at a site about 80 km north of Pune. GMRT consists of 30 fully steerable gigantic parabolic dishes of 45m diameter each spread over distances of up to 25 km. GMRT is one of the most challenging experimental programmes in basic sciences undertaken by Indian scientists and engineers. GMRT allows for the measurement of the metrewave range of the Electromagnetic spectrum and, using the technique of aperture synthesis, allows to make highly sensitive maps of the sky. The instrument is at par with other radio telescopes in the world like the VLA in terms of resolution.

=== Ooty Radio Telescope (ORT) ===
The Ooty Radio Telescope (ORT, as it is known) is a cylindrical paraboloid of reflecting surface, 530 m long and 30 m wide, placed on a hill whose slope of about 11 degree in the north-south direction which is the same as the latitude of the location of ORT. This makes it possible to track celestial objects for about 10 hours continuously from their rising in east to their setting in the west by simply rotating the antenna mechanically along its long axis. The telescope is operated at 326.5 MHz (a wavelength of 0.92 m) with 15 MHz usable bandwidth. The large size of the telescope makes it highly sensitive. It has been designed and fabricated fully indigenously.

=== Radio Physics Laboratory ===
Radio Physics Laboratory(RPL) is a joint initiative of National Centre for Radio Astrophysics (NCRA-TIFR) and Inter-University Centre for Astronomy and Astrophysics (IUCAA). It has set up several radio antennas in the campus itself. These contain 3-metre and 4-metre radio antennas as well as the construction of a 15-metre antenna in progress. RPL conducts a variety of student training programs including two major annual all India programs - Radio Astronomy Winter School for College students (RAWSC) and Pulsar Observing for Students (POS).

== Notable people ==
Notable People associated with NCRA :

- Govind Swarup, An Internationally renowned Radio Astronomer and Emeritus Professor of the Institute
- Vijay Kumar Kapahi, radio astronomer and former Director of the Institute
- Aroor Pramesh Rao, radio astronomer and former professor of the Institute
- Subramaniam Ananthakrishnan, radio astronomer and former professor at the institute
- Rajaram Nityananda, former Director of the Institute
- Gopal Krishna, radio astronomer and former professor at the institute
- D. J. Saikia, radio astronomer and former professor of the institute
- Yashwant Gupta, radio astronomer and Director of the institute, a Shanti Swarup Bhatnagar prize awardee
- Jayaram Chengalur, radio astronomer, professor at the institute and current director TIFR
- Bhal Chandra Joshi, radio astronomer, professor at the institute and founding Director of the Indian Pulsar Timing Array (InPTA)
- Sandeep K. Sirothia, radio astronomer, former faculty of the institute and PI of the TIFR GMRT Sky Survey (TGSS at 150 MHz).
- Nissim Kanekar, astrophysicist, Shanti Swarup Bhatnagar laureate and Infosys Prize awardee
- Poonam Chandra, radio astronomer professor at the institute
- Nirupam Roy, radio astronomer and alumni of the institute
- Abhirup Dutta, radio astronomer and alumni of the institute
- Ananda Hota, radio astronomer, alumni of the institute and founder of RAD@home citizen science Collaboratory

== Visiting Students Research Programme ==
The Visiting Students Research Programme (VSRP) is a summer programme conducted annually during the summer season by the National Centre for Radio Astrophysics.

== See also ==
- Giant Metrewave Radio Telescope(GMRT)
- List of astronomical societies
- Ooty Radio Telescope
- Square Kilometre Array
