= Govind Swarup =

Indian radio astronomer

Govind Swarup FRS
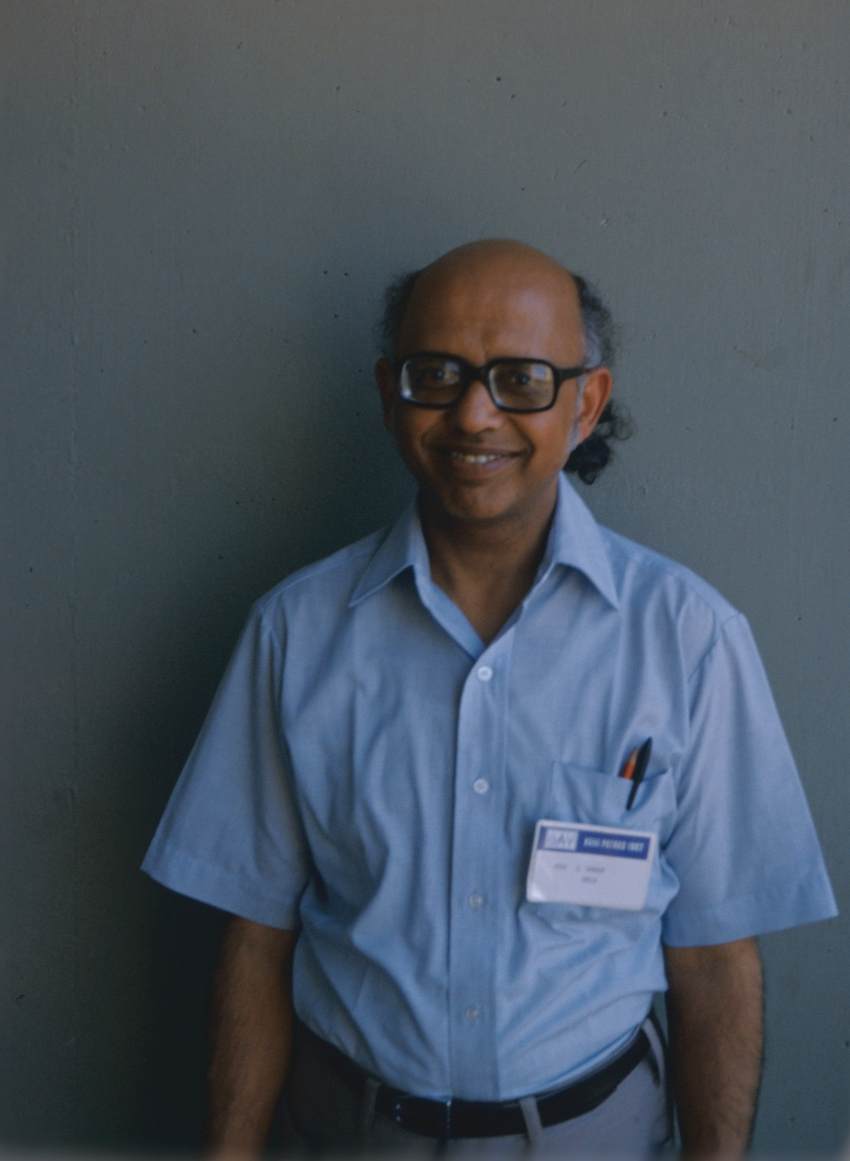
- Born: 23 March 1929; Thakurdwara, United Provinces, British India
- Died: 7 September 2020 (aged 91); Pune
- Known for: Radioastronomy; R&D
- Awards: 1972 Shanti Swarup Bhatnagar Prize; 1973 Padma Shri; 1984 INSA P.C. Mahalanobis Medal; 1986 IPS Biren Roy Trust Medal; 1987 INSA Vainu Bappu Memorial Award; 1987 Tskolovosky Medal; 1987 NASI Meghnad Saha Medal; 1988 TWAS Prize; 1990 IURS John Howard Delinger Gold Medal 1993 INSA C. V. Raman Medal; 1994 UoC Sir Devaprasad Sarbadhikari Medal; 2005 RAS Herschel Medal; 2006 UoP Lifetime Achievement Award; 2007 Grote Reber Medal; 2007 ISC President's Medal
- Scientific career
- Fields: Radioastronomy
- Workplaces: TIFR
- Doctoral advisor: Ronald N. Bracewell
- Doctoral students: Vijay Kumar Kapahi, Gopal Krishna

Govind Swarup (March 23, 1929 – September 7, 2020) was an Indian astronomer who was a pioneer in radio astronomy. In addition to research contributions in multiple areas of astronomy and astrophysics, he was a driving force behind the building of "ingenious, innovative and powerful observational facilities for front-line research in radio astronomy".

Swarup was the key scientist behind the concept, design and installation of the Ooty Radio Telescope (Ootacamund, India) and the Giant Metrewave Radio Telescope (GMRT) near Pune. Swarup was the founding director of the National Centre for Radio Astrophysics (NCRA) at the Tata Institute of Fundamental Research (TIFR). Under his leadership, a strong group in radio astrophysics was built at Tata Institute of Fundamental Research that is comparable to the best in the world.

He published over 125 research papers, edited four books, and held at least two patents. He contributed to the fields of solar radio emission, radio galaxies, quasars, pulsars, interplanetary scintillation, dark matter and cosmology.

== Early life and education ==
Govind Swarup was born in the town of Thakurdwara in Uttar Pradesh in 1929. He attended Allahabad University, where he received his BSc degree (1948) and MSc in physics (1950).

Swarup spent several years at the National Physical Laboratory in Delhi with K. S. Krishnan (1950–53), measuring the spin resonance of electrons. Because there was interest in the newly developing field of radio astronomy, arrangements were made to send Swarup and another student to the Radio Physics Division of CSIRO, in Sydney, Australia, to work with Joseph Pawsey and learn to build radio arrays for studying the sun. In March 1953 Swarup arrived at Potts Hill in New South Wales on a two-year fellowship. He worked closely with Pawsey, Wilbur Norman Christiansen, John Gatenby Bolton, Bernard Mills and others. Swarup was also able to arrange for parts from a discarded 32-element array to be sent from Australia to the National Laboratory in India. He returned to the National Laboratory from 1955 to 1956.

When the array parts were seriously delayed, Swarup went to the United States. He worked as a research associate at the Radio Astronomy Station of Harvard University at Fort Davis, Texas (1956–57). He then became a research assistant at Stanford University (1957–60) in California, completing his doctoral thesis with Ron Bracewell. Swarup received his PhD from Stanford University in 1961 and became an assistant professor at Stanford University (1961–63).

Swarup was later awarded a number of honorary degrees: Doctor of Engineering, University of Roorkee in 1987 and Doctor of Science, Banaras Hindu University in 1996. He was also given an honorary Doctor of Science by Pandit Ravishankar Shukla University, Raipur in 2010.

== Career ==
Returning from Stanford to India in March 1963, Swarup joined TIFR as a reader at the request of Homi Bhabha. In 1965, he became associate professor, professor in 1970, and professor of eminence in 1989. He became project director of the GMRT in 1987, centre director of the National Centre for Radio Astrophysics (NCRA) of TIFR in 1993 and retired from TIFR in 1994.

== Major contributions ==
While at CSIRO, Swarup and R. Parthasarathy converted Potts Hill's L-shaped grating radio interferometer telescope to an operating wavelength of 500 MHz. They used it to make daily observations and developed a one-dimensional map of the Quiet Sun. While at the Harvard College Observatory Swarup discovered 'Type U' solar radio bursts.

At Stanford, Swarup continued to make studies of radio emissions from the Quiet Sun and developed a gyro-radiation model of solar emissions of microwave radiation. He explained the emission mechanism of sunspots in terms of gyroresonance processes.

In 1959, Swarup developed a technique for the round-trip transmission of phase measurements that enabled the phase equalization of all 32 antennas in an array to be carried out in minutes rather than weeks. Published in 1961, this technique has been used in radio interferometers world-wide.

In 1962 Swarup used the Stanford compound-grating interferometer to examine Cygnus A. Previous researchers had shown that the radio galaxy contained two distinct radio lobes. In 1963 Swarup reported the presence of a continuous "bridge" of radio emissions between the two lobes, the first instance of a steep spectrum bridge. Such bridges are used to estimate the age of a radio galaxy.

=== Kalyan Radio Telescope ===
Returning to India on April 2, 1963, Swarup began to assemble a group at the Tata Institute of Fundamental Research near Mumbai. With the antennae from Potts Hill, they constructed the Kalyan Radio Telescope, the first radio telescope array in India, which was completed in 1965. The site was located at the southern end of the abandoned Kalyan Airstrip.

=== Ooty Radio Telescope (ORT) ===
Swarup's next major installation was the Ooty Radio Telescope (ORT) at Ooty in South India. It became operational in 1970, first observing a lunar occultation event on February 18, 1970. The design was "unique and innovative", "the first large equatorial cylindrical parabolic radio telescope with steerability in both directions". 530 m long 30 m wide, it was located at an incline on a hill so that it would have a long axis of rotation parallel to the axis of the earth. The design made it possible to track the hour angle of celestial radio sources for 9.5 hrs.

ORT has been used for a number of important observations. Using lunar occultation, it provided independent evidence for the Big Bang model. Occultation observations of Sagittarius A* at the Galactic Center of the Milky Way galaxy supported the separation of its emissions into two dimensions, thermal and non-thermal. After fifty years, ORT continues to be used to observe solar winds, coronal mass ejections, and pulsars.

In 1979, Swarup went on sabbatical at the Very Large Array (VLA) in New Mexico, where studied jets and hot spots. During the 1980s, he studied the polarization of radio cores of galaxies and quasars.

=== Giant Metrewave Radio Telescope (GMRT) ===
Beginning in 1985, Swarup began construction of the Giant Metrewave Radio Telescope (GMRT), at Khodad near Pune. The telescope was completed in 1997. Inspired by the Very Large Array, and the Arecibo Telescope, GMRT contains 30 steerable parabolic dishes, each of them 45m in diameter, arranged in a Y-shape array over a 25 km area. Using a novel SMART (Stretched Mesh Attached to Rope Trusses) design concept, GMRT is highly versatile. It is the world's largest radio telescope for the detection of frequencies in the range of 130–1430 MHz and has been used by researchers from over 40 countries. GMRT was recognized as a key historical achievement in electrical and electronic engineering and given IEEE Milestone status in 2020.

One of the concerns behind the development of the GMRT was the question of dark matter and the nature of the universe. A sensitive radio telescope at an appropriate frequency (327 MHz) was needed to test predictions about whether the universe contained hot dark matter (HDM) or cold dark matter (CDM). Swarup has used the GMRT to observe the emission and absorption of atomic hydrogen from objects in the early Universe, examine the cosmic cold spot, and study radio emissions from Venus.

== Awards and honours ==
=== Professional societies ===
- Royal Society, London;
- Royal Astronomical Society, London;
- Indian Academy of Sciences;
- Indian National Science Academy;
- National Academy of Sciences, Allahabad, India;
- Third World Academy of Sciences;
- Astronomical Society of India (President 1975–77);
- International Astronomical Union (IAU) (President, Commission 40 on Radio Astronomy, 1979–82);
- National Academy of Sciences, India; (1997–2000).

=== Awards ===
- 1973 Padma Shri
- 1972 S.S. Bhatnagar, Council of Scientific & Industrial Research, India
- 1984 P.C. Mahalanobis Medal, Indian National Science Academy
- 1993 The C.V. Raman Medal, Indian National Science Academy
- 2005 Herschel Medal of the Royal Astronomical Society
- 2009 Homi Bhabha Award for Lifetime Achievement by the Prime minister of India

== Personal life ==
Swarup was married to Bina Swarup and resided in Pune, India. He had one daughter and one son.
