= Ooty Radio Telescope =

Astrophysics observatory in southern India

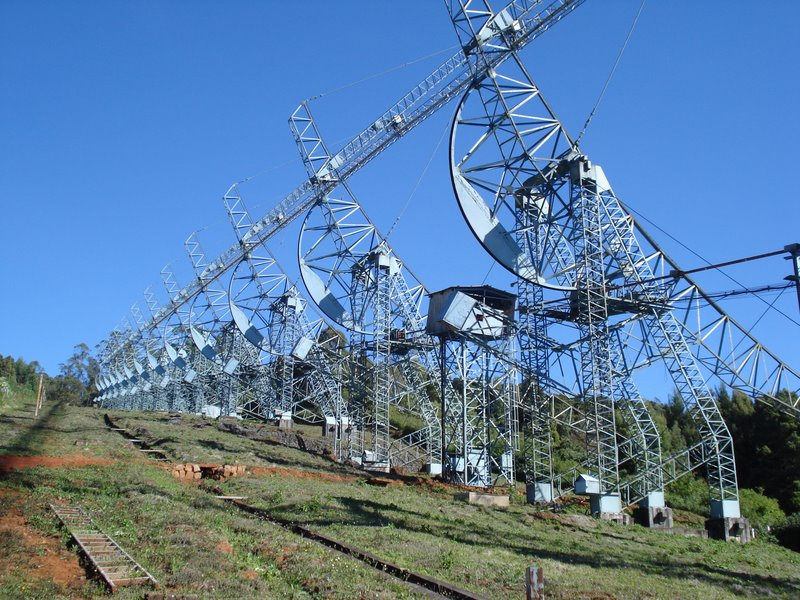
- Radio Telescope at Ooty
- Alternative names: ORT
- Location: Muthorai, Tamil Nadu, India
- Coordinates: 11°23′00″N 76°39′58″E
- Altitude: 2,240 m (7,350 ft)
- Wavelength: 0.92 m (330 MHz)
- First light: 1970
- Length: 530 m (1,738 ft 10 in)
- Width: 30 m (98 ft 5 in)
- Collecting area: 16,000 m^{2} (170,000 sq ft)
- Website: rac.ncra.tifr.res.in
- Location within India
- Related media on Commons

The Ooty Radio Telescope (ORT) is located in Muthorai near Ooty, in South Indian state of Tamil Nadu. It is part of the National Centre for Radio Astrophysics (NCRA) of the Tata Institute of Fundamental Research (TIFR), which is funded by the Government of India through the Department of Atomic Energy. The radio telescope is a 530-metre (1,740 ft) long and 30-metre (98 ft) tall cylindrical parabolic antenna. It operates at a frequency of 326.5 MHz with a maximum bandwidth of 15 MHz at the front end.

== Design ==
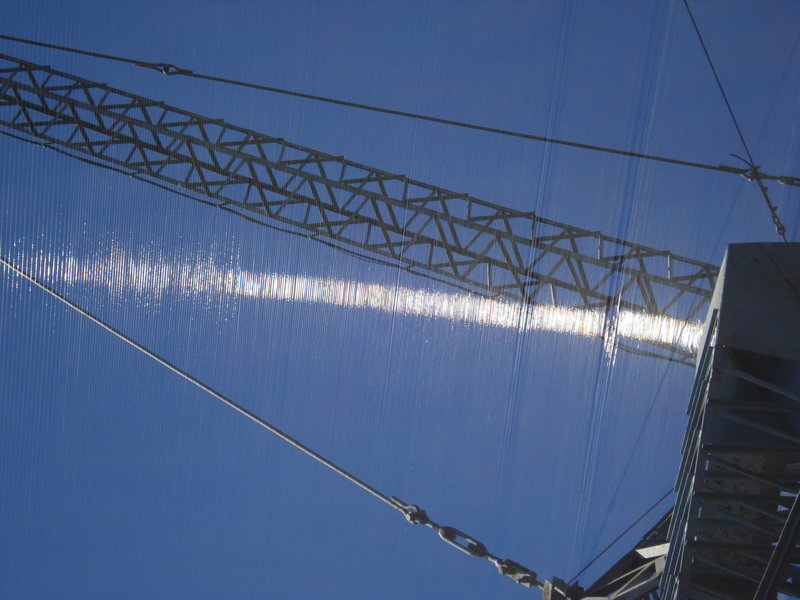
Stainless steel wires forming the parabolic reflector

The Ooty Radio Telescope has been designed and fabricated with domestic Indian technological resources. The ORT was completed in 1970 and continues to be one of the most sensitive radio telescopes in the world.

Observations made using this telescope have led to important discoveries and to explain various phenomena occurring in the Solar System and in other celestial bodies.

The reflecting surface of the telescope is made of 1,100 thin stainless-steel wires running parallel to each other for the entire length of the cylinder and supported on 24 steerable parabolic frames.

An array of 1,056 half-wave dipoles in front of a 90-degree corner reflector forms the primary feed of the telescope. It has an angular resolution of 2.3deg x 5.5sec(dec)'.

== History ==
The structure of the radio telescope was designed in July 1963. Muthorai village near Ooty was selected as the suitable location and the construction work began in 1965. The telescope was completed in 1970. Normal post-commissioning and calibration use began in 1971.

The ORT was upgraded in 1992 by the addition of a phased array of 1,056 array of dipoles each followed by a GaAsFET low noise amplifier (LNA) and a four-bit PIN diode microstripline phase shifter behind each dipole. The new feed was installed along the focal line of the 530 m long and 30 m wide parabolic cylindrical reflector of the ORT. This new feed brought about an improvement in the sensitivity of the ORT by a factor greater than three compared to the previous feed. The high sensitivity of the feed system and the large collecting area of ORT has been exploited for the studies of astrophysical phenomena such as pulsars, solar wind, recombination lines, and protogalaxies.

As of 2017, the ORT is undergoing a major upgrade to its receiver chain, which will result in a new system called the Ooty Wide Field Array (OWFA). The OWFA is designed to function as a 264-element interferometric array, and to provide a significantly larger instantaneous bandwidth as well as field-of-view compared to the legacy ORT receiver system. This upgrade will significantly enhance the ORT's capabilities for heliospheric studies. Additionally this upgrade is also expected to open other avenues of research particularly in the newly emerging areas of 21 cm (8.3 in) intensity mapping and studies of transient radio sources.

== Features ==
The large size of the telescope makes it highly sensitive. As an example, it is in principle capable of detecting signals from a 1 watt radio station located 10 million kilometres (6.2×10^{6} mi) away in space. The telescope sits on a natural slope of 11°, which matches the latitude of the location. This gives the telescope an equatorial mount that allows tracking of celestial sources for up to ten hours in the east–west direction. In the north–south direction, the telescope operates as a phased-array and is steerable by varying the phase gradients

The telescope can be operated in either total power or correlation mode. In each mode, 12 beams are formed; beam 1 is the southernmost beam and beam 12 is the northernmost. These 12-beam systems are useful in sky survey observations. Recently, the reflecting surface of the ORT has been refurbished. A new digital back-end has been built for the ORT by the colleagues at Raman Research Institute (RRI), Bangalore.

== Observations ==
The ORT has produced results on radio galaxies, quasars, supernovae and pulsars, One long-term program determined the angular structure of several hundred distant radio galaxies and quasars using the lunar occultation method.

The application of this database to observational cosmology provided independent evidence against the steady state theory and supported the Big Bang model of the universe.

The telescope is currently being used mainly to observe interplanetary scintillation, which may provide valuable information about the solar wind and magnetic storms that affect the near-Earth environment. Interplanetary scintillation observations provide a database to understand space weather changes and their predictability.

=== Analog correlator ===
This is widely used for IPS observations.

== Upgrade ==
The upgraded telescope has been used for observing pulse nulling. The interferometer can be used at Channel 37 (608 MHz to 614 MHz, important radio astronomy frequencies) with lesser performance.

== Ongoing projects ==
- IPS observations: The interplanetary scintillation (IPS) observations obtained from the Ooty Radio Telescope on a large number of radio sources provide the day-to-day changes of the solar wind speed and density turbulence in the inner heliosphere.
- Pulsar timing observations
- Spectral line observations

== See also ==
- Govind Swarup
- Radio Astronomy
- Radio Telescope
- List of radio telescopes
