= Tata Institute of Fundamental Research =

Public research institute in Mumbai, India

Coordinates: 18.90757°N 72.80601°E

- Type: Public Deemed university
- Established: 1 June 1945; 81 years ago
- Director: Jayaram N. Chengalur
- Academic staff: 268
- Students: 696
- Postgraduates: 45
- Doctoral students: 651
- Location: Mumbai, Maharashtra, India
- Campus: 15 acres (6.1 ha); Urban
- Website: www.tifr.res.in

Tata Institute of Fundamental Research (TIFR) is a research Institute under the Department of Atomic Energy of the Government of India. It is a public deemed university located at Navy Nagar, Colaba in Mumbai. It also has centres in Bangalore, Pune and Hyderabad. TIFR conducts research primarily in the natural sciences, the biological sciences and theoretical computer science.

== History ==
Homi J. Bhabha, known for his role in the development of the Indian atomic energy programme, wrote to the Sir Dorabji Tata Trust requesting financial assistance to set up a scientific research institute. With support from J.R.D. Tata, then chairman of the Tata Group, TIFR was founded on 1 June 1945, and Homi Bhabha was appointed its first director. The institute initially operated within the campus of the Indian Institute of Science, Bangalore before relocating to Mumbai later that year. TIFR's new campus in Colaba was designed by Chicago-based architect Helmuth Bartsch and was inaugurated by Prime Minister Jawaharlal Nehru on 15 January 1962.

Shortly after Indian Independence, in 1949, the Council of Scientific and Industrial Research (CSIR) designated TIFR to be the centre for all large-scale projects in nuclear research. The first theoretical physics group was set up by Bhabha's students B.M. Udgaonkar and K.S. Singhvi. In December 1950, Bhabha organised an international conference at TIFR on elementary particle physics. Several world-renowned scientists attended the conference, including Rudolf Peierls, Léon Rosenfeld, William Fowler as well as Meghnad Saha, Vikram Sarabhai and others providing expertise from India. In the 1950s, TIFR gained prominence in the field of cosmic ray physics, with the setting up of research facilities in Ooty and in the Kolar gold mines.

In 1957, India's first digital computer, TIFRAC was built in TIFR. Acting on the suggestions of British physiologist Archibald Hill, Bhabha invited Obaid Siddiqi to set up a research group in molecular biology. This ultimately resulted in the establishment of the National Centre for Biological Sciences (NCBS), Bangalore twenty years later. In 1970, TIFR started research in radio astronomy with the setting up of the Ooty Radio Telescope. Encouraged by the success of ORT, Govind Swarup persuaded J. R. D. Tata to help set up the Giant Metrewave Radio Telescope near Pune, India.

TIFR attained the official deemed university status in June 2002. To meet the ever-growing demand of space needed for research labs and accommodation, the institute came up with a new campus at Hyderabad.

== Research ==
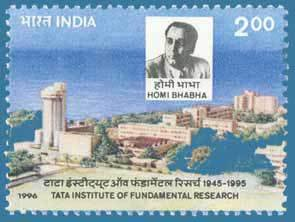
Indian Postage stamp of Tata Institute of Fundamental Research, 1996

Research at TIFR is distributed across three schools, working over the mathematical sciences, natural sciences, technology and computer science.

=== School of Mathematics ===
Since its birth in the 1950s, several contributions to mathematics have come from TIFR School of Mathematics. Notable contributions from TIFR mathematicians include Raghavan Narasimhan's proof of the embedding of open Riemann surfaces in $\mathbb{C}^3$, C. S. Seshadri's work on projective modules over polynomial rings and M. S. Narasimhan's results in the theory of pseudo differential operators.

Narasimhan and Seshadri wrote a seminal paper on stable vector bundles, work which has been recognised as one of the most influential articles in the area. M. S. Raghunathan started research at TIFR on algebraic and discrete groups, and was recognised for his work on rigidity.

=== School of Natural Sciences ===
The School of Natural Sciences is further split into seven departments working in several areas of physics, chemistry and biology.

Within physics, the Department of Theoretical Physics (DTP) was set up by Bhabha, who conducted research in high energy physics and Condensed Matter Physics. The department worked on the major advances in this period such as Quantum Field Theory, string theory, and superconductivity. The current faculty includes Sandip Trivedi, Shiraz Minwalla, Abhijit Gadde, and Gautam Mandal. Several early faculty members at the institution were renowned in their fields. These include Ashoke Sen, who conducted seminal work on String Theory, specifically S-Duality, while at this institution. Other distinguished members were Spenta Wadia, Sunil Mukhi, Deepak Dhar and Nandini Trivedi.

The Department of Astrophysics works in areas like star and planet formation, astrochemistry, exoplanets, stellar binaries, gravitational waves and cosmology. TIFR is involved in building India's first gravity wave detector. The High Energy Physics Department, TIFR has been involved in major accelerator projects like the KEK, Tevatron, LEP and the LHC. TIFR also runs the Pelletron particle accelerator facility. The Department of Nuclear and Atomic Physics conducts research in nuclear structure, reactions, spectroscopy, lasers and molecular dynamics and ultracold atoms. Bhabha's motivation resulted in the development of an NMR spectrometer for solid state studies. The Department of Condensed Matter Physics and Material Sciences also conducts experimental research in high-temperature superconductivity, nanoelectronics and nanophotonics.

=== School of Technology and Computer Science ===
The School of Technology and Computer Science grew out of early activities carried out at TIFR for building digital computers. Today, its activities cover areas such as Algorithms, Complexity Theory, Formal Method, Applied Probability, Learning Theory, Mathematical Finance, Information Theory, Communications, etc.

=== Department of Biological Sciences ===
The Department Of Biological Sciences was set up by Obaid Siddiqi in early 1960s as a molecular biology group. Over the years has expanded to encompass various other branches of modern biology. The department has fourteen labs covering various aspects of modern molecular and cell biology.

== Notable alumni ==
- Ranjan Roy Daniel (1923–2005), former Deputy Director of TIFR and recipient of Padma Bhushan
- Jitendra Nath Goswami, Principal Scientific Investigator of Chandrayaan-1, Chairman to the advisory board for Chandrayaan-2, and Padma Shri recipient
- Vijay Kumar Kapahi, astrophysicist, Shanti Swarup Bhatnagar laureate
- B. V. Sreekantan, astrophysicist and Padma Bhushan recipient
- K. R. K. Easwaran, molecular biophysicist, Shanti Swarup Bhatnagar Prize laureate
- Ghanshyam Swarup, molecular biologist, Shanti Swarup Bhatnagar laureate
- B. L. K. Somayajulu, geochemist, Shanti Swarup Bhatnagar laureate
- G. Naresh Patwari, chemist, Shanti Swarup Bhatnagar laureate
- Maneesha S. Inamdar, stem cell biologist, N-Bios laureate

== TIFR Centers ==
TIFR also includes institutes outside its main campus in Colaba and Mumbai:

- Homi Bhabha Centre for Science Education at Deonar, Mumbai
- International Centre for Theoretical Sciences at Bangalore
- National Centre for Biological Sciences at Bangalore
- National Centre for Radio Astrophysics at Pune
- National Balloon Facility at Hyderabad
- TIFR Centre for Applicable Mathematics, Bangalore for Mathematics
- TIFR Hyderabad Centre for Interdisciplinary Sciences

== Visiting Students Research Programme ==
The Visiting Students Research Programme (VSRP) is a summer programme conducted annually during the summer season by the Tata Institute of Fundamental Research. VSRP is offered in the subjects Physics and Astronomy, Chemistry, Mathematics, Biology and Computer Science.

== See also ==
- Indian Institute of Science
- TIFRAC, the first computer built indigenously in India
