= Giant Metrewave Radio Telescope =

Radio telescope center

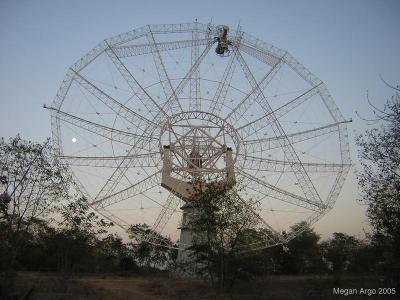
- Alternative names: GMRT
- Location: Narayangaon, Pune district, Pune division, Maharashtra, India
- Coordinates: 19°05′47″N 74°02′59″E
- Wavelength: 50, 1,500 MHz (6.00, 0.20 m)
- Diameter: 45 m (147 ft 8 in)
- Collecting area: 47,713 m^{2} (513,580 sq ft)
- Website: www.gmrt.ncra.tifr.res.in
- Location within India
- Related media on Commons

The Giant Metrewave Radio Telescope (GMRT), located near Narayangaon, Pune in India, is an array of thirty fully steerable parabolic radio telescopes of 45 metre diameter, observing at metre wavelengths. It is the largest and most sensitive radio telescope array in the world at low frequencies. It is operated by the National Centre for Radio Astrophysics (NCRA), a part of the Tata Institute of Fundamental Research, Mumbai. It was conceived and built under the direction of Govind Swarup during 1984 to 1996. It is an interferometric array with baselines of up to 25 kilometres (16 mi). It was recently upgraded with new receivers, after which it is also known as the upgraded Giant Metrewave Radio Telescope (uGMRT).

== Location ==
The Giant Metrewave Radio Telescope (GMRT) Observatory is located about 80 km north of Pune at Khodad. A nearby town is Narayangaon which is around 9 km from the telescope site. The office of National Centre for Radio Astrophysics (NCRA) is located in the Savitribai Phule Pune University campus.

== Science and observations ==
One of the aims for the telescope during its development was to search for the highly redshifted 21-cm line radiation from primordial neutral hydrogen clouds in order to determine the epoch of galaxy formation in the universe.

Astronomers from all over the world regularly use this telescope to observe many different astronomical objects such as the Sun, Jupiter, exoplanets, magnetically active stars, microquasars or binary stars with a compact object (neutron star or black hole) as companion, pulsars, supernovae, supernovae remnants (SNR) HII regions, galaxies, quasars, radio galaxies, clusters of galaxies, cluster radio relics and halos, high-z galaxies, stellar winds, Inter-galactic HI absorption lines, diffuse radio emission from filaments of galaxies, possible signs of time-variation of fundamental constants, variation of gas content with cosmic epoch, epoch of reionisation etc. .

GMRT has produced an all sky survey named TIFR GMRT Sky Survey (TGSS). Nearly 90% of the sky has been imaged at the frequency of 150 MHz (wavelength 2m), with an angular resolution of 25 arc second and rms noise of 5 mili Jansky per beam. Source Catalogue and FITS image files for the scientific community are freely available. General public and citizen scientists can see 150 MHz image of any, supernova remnant, spiral galaxy or radio galaxy with its name or position at the RAD@home RGB-maker web-tool. Power and versatility of the GMRT has led to a renaissance in the field of low frequency radio astronomy.

From this, TGSS survey, data, in August 2018, the most distant known radio galaxy : TGSS J1530+1049, located at a distance of 12 billion light years, was discovered by GMRT.

In February 2020, it helped in the observation of evidence of the largest known explosion in the history of the universe, the Ophiuchus Supercluster explosion.

In January 2023, the telescope picked up a radio signal (21 cm line emission from neutral atomic hydrogen gas) which originated from 8.8 billion light years away.

== Activities ==
Each year on National Science Day the observatory invites the public and pupils from schools and colleges in the surrounding area to visit the site where they can listen to explanations of radio astronomy, receiver technology and astronomy from the engineers and astronomers who work there. Nearby schools/colleges are also invited to put their individual science experiments in exhibition and the best one in each level (primary, secondary school and Jr. college) are awarded.

Visitors are allowed into GMRT only on Fridays in two sessions - Morning (1100 hrs - 1300 hrs) and Evening (1500 hrs to 1700 hrs).

== Gallery ==
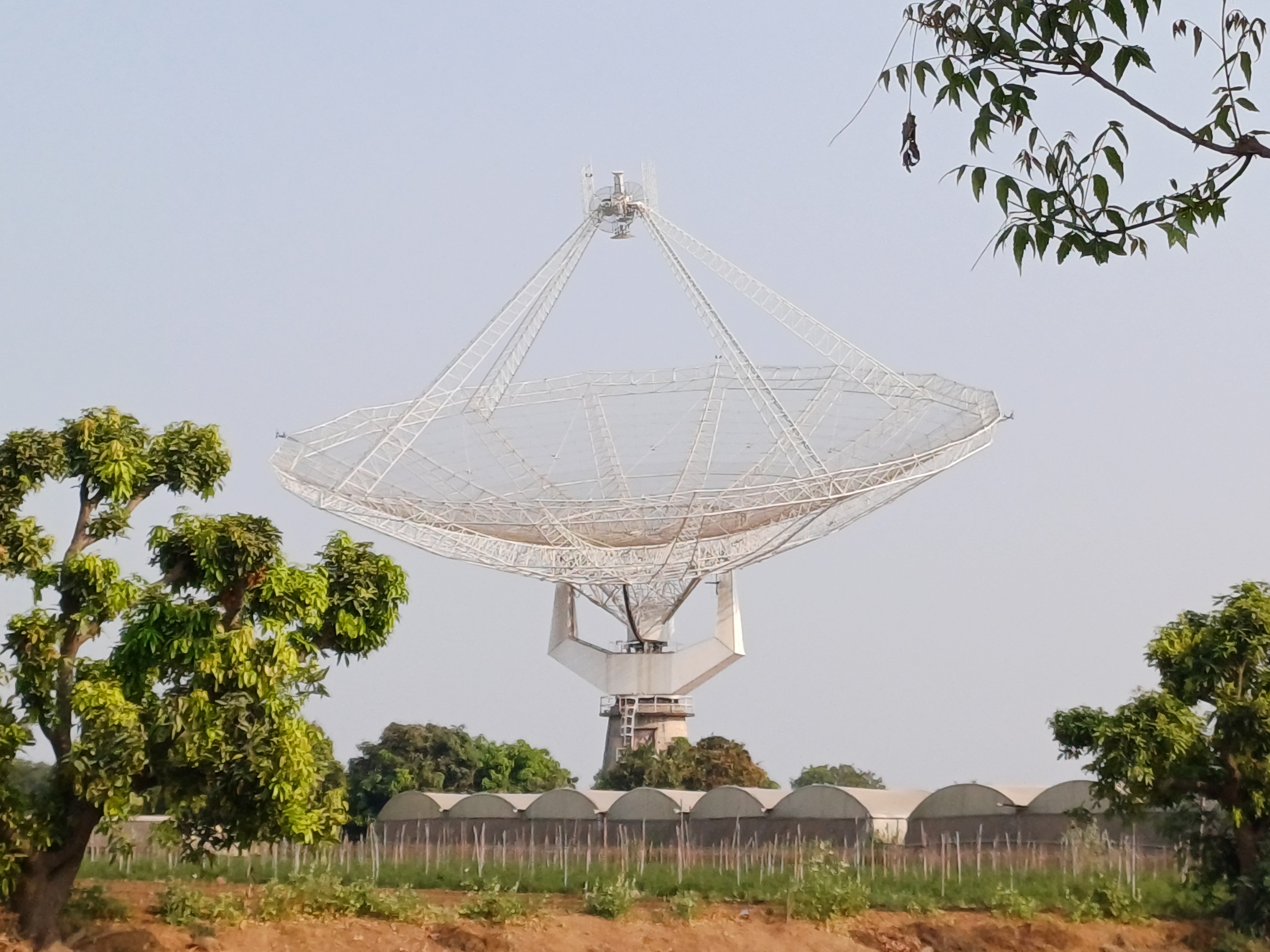
GMRT antenna

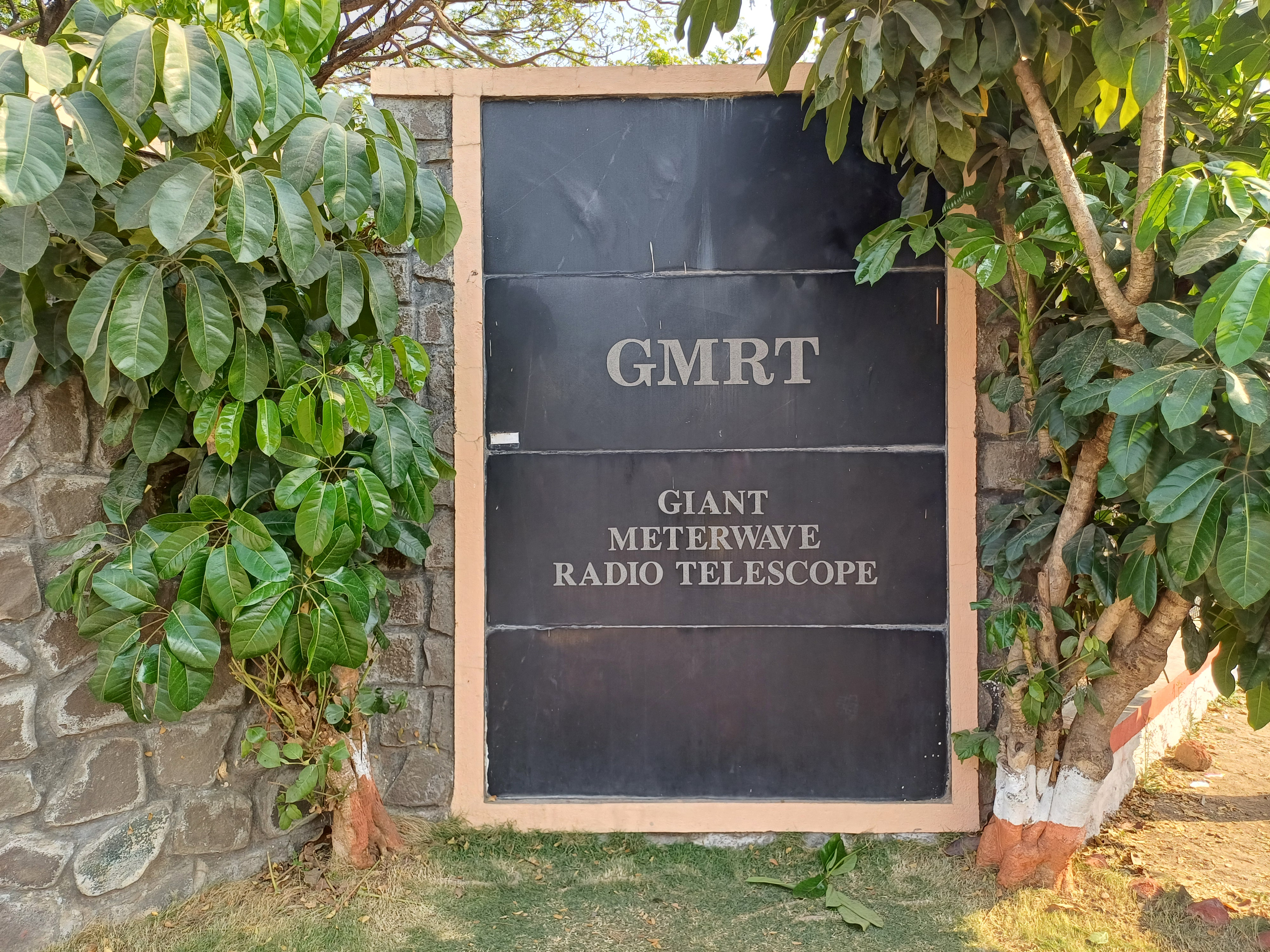
Plaque of GMRT at the entrance gate

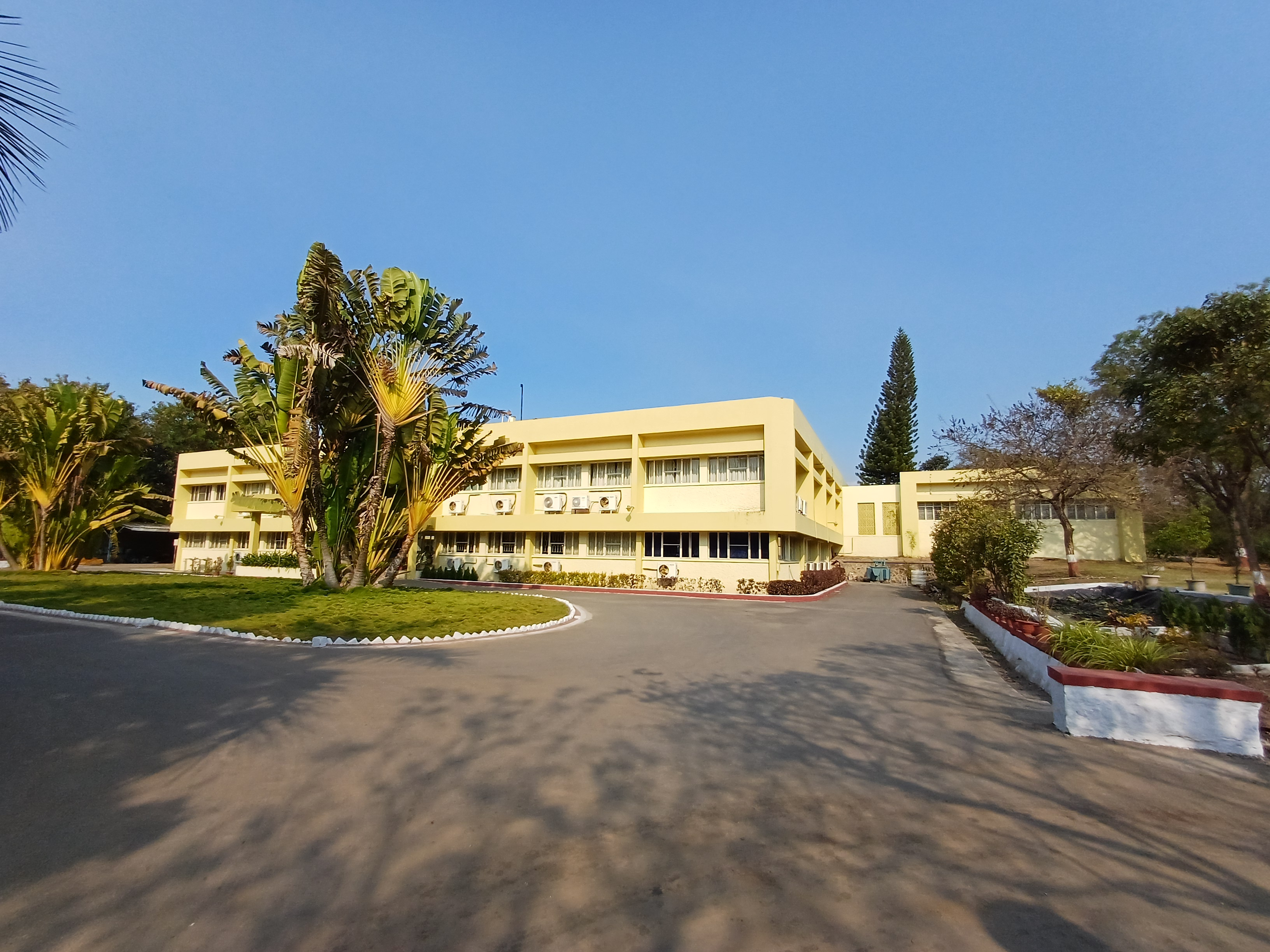
Main administrative building of GMRT in the campus

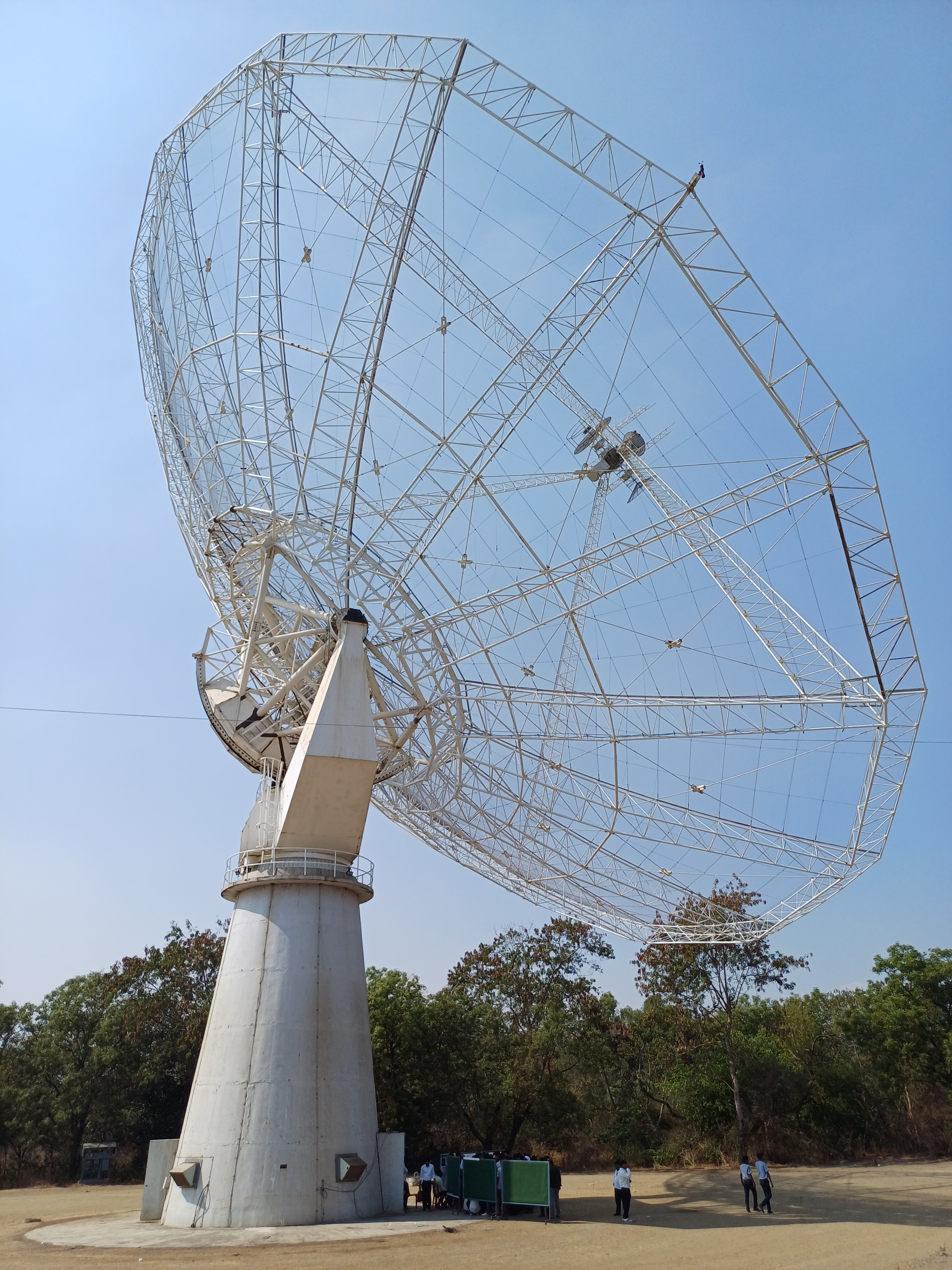
Backside view of GMRT C-3 antenna from the right

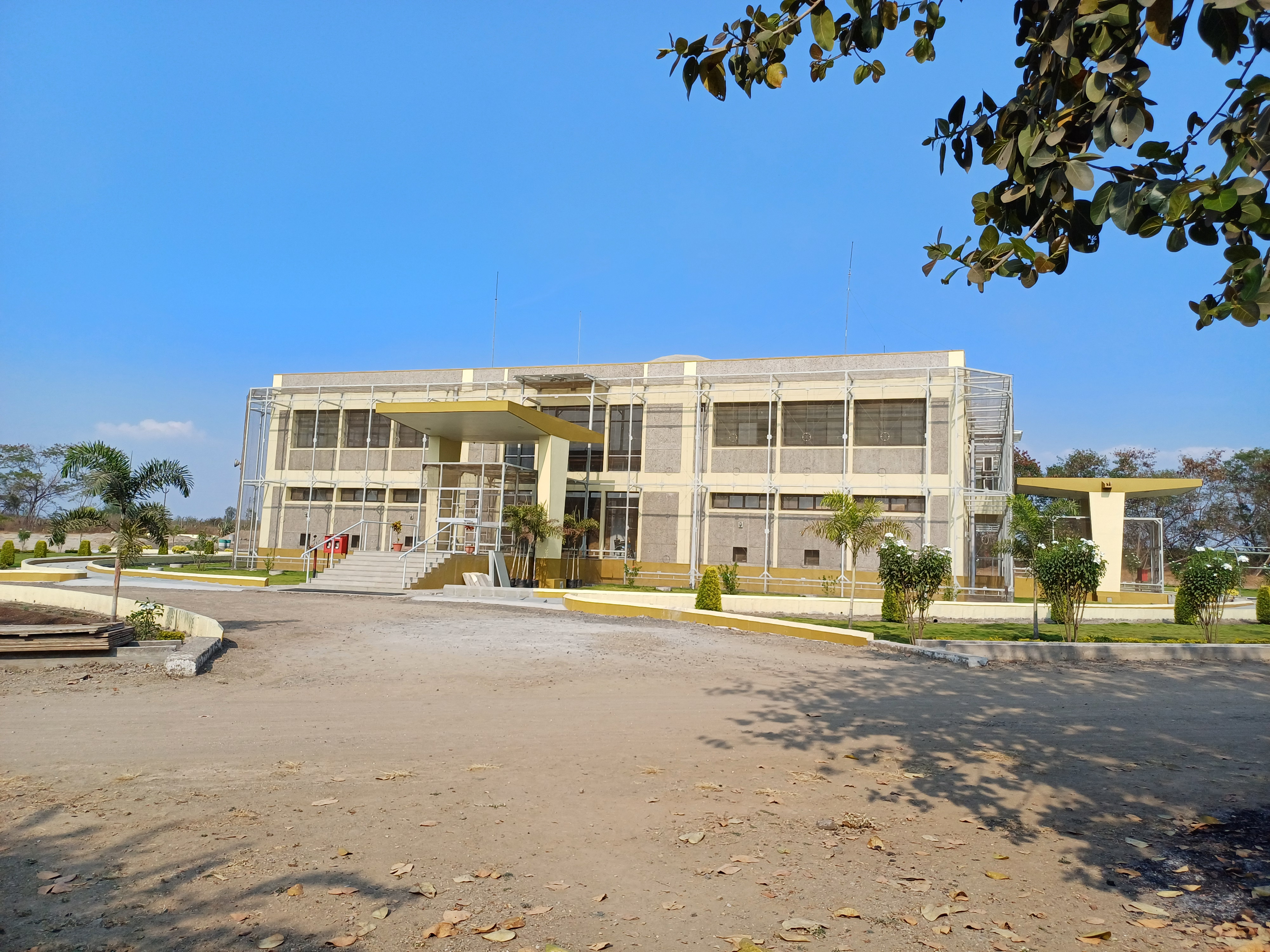
New building of GMRT under construction in the campus

== See also ==
- List of radio telescopes
