= ADL =

ʿAdl (Arabic: عَدْل) is an Arabic word meaning justice.

ADL or adl may also refer to:

== Computing ==
- Action description language, a formal language for automatic planning systems
- Adventure Development Language, created by On-Line Systems
- Alder Lake series Intel CPUs
- Archetype definition language, as used in openEHR archetypes
- Architecture description language, a formal language for architecture description and representation
- Argument-dependent name lookup, a lookup for function names in the C++ programming language
- Assertion definition language, a specification language

== Organizations ==
- ADL astronomical society, Slovenian astronomical society
- Amalgamated Dairies Limited, a dairy cooperative in Canada
- Akademiska Damkören Lyran or The Academic Female Voice Choir Lyran, a Finnish choir
- Aleppo Defenders Legion, Syria, a pro-Assadist militant organization
- Alexander Dennis Limited, bus manufacturer in Scotland
- Animal Defense League, animal rights organisation in North America
- Anti-Defamation League, a Jewish non-governmental organization based in the US
- Armenian Democratic Liberal Party, a political party
- Arthur D. Little, a management consulting firm

== People ==
- Arthur Dehon Little, an American chemist and chemical engineer
- Aurelio De Laurentiis, filmmaker and president of S.S.C. Napoli

== Places ==
- Adelaide Airport in State of South Australia (IATA airport code ADL)
- Adlington (Lancashire) railway station, England, National Rail code ADL
- A demonym for the city of Adelaide, South Australia

== Other uses ==
- ADL (album), by Yeat, 2026
- Adl (newspaper), published in Fars, Iran
- Activities of daily living, a term used in medicine and nursing, especially in the care of the elderly
- Advance–decline line, a stock market indicator
- Advanced Distributed Learning, part of an effort to standardize and modernize training and education management and delivery
- Arena Developmental League, American football league that became the National Arena League
- Gallong language, a Tibeto-Burman language of India
- New Zealand ADL class diesel electric unit, a type of diesel railway vehicle used on Auckland's suburban network

== See also ==
- ADLS (disambiguation)
- ALD (disambiguation)
