= Surindar Kumar Trehan =

Indian mathematician (1931–2004)

- Born: 4 April 1931; West Punjab, Gujarat (now in Pakistan)
- Died: 9 September 2004 (aged 72); Chandigarh, India
- Education: University of Chicago
- Awards: Shanti Swarup Bhatnagar Prize for Science and Technology
- Scientific career
- Fields: Non-linear stability in magnetohydrodynamics, Mathematics
- Doctoral advisor: Subrahmanyan Chandrasekhar

Surindar Kumar Trehan (S.K. Trehan) was an Indian mathematician who specialised in non-linear stability in magnetohydrodynamics.

He was awarded in 1976 the Shanti Swarup Bhatnagar Prize for Science and Technology, the highest science award in India, in the mathematical sciences category. Prof. Trehan has done significant work on stability of force-free magnetic fields, stability of jets and cylinders and stability of inhomogeneous plasmas. His work on the mathematical treatment of gaseous polytropes in the presence of a magnetic field is a breakthrough in this area. He has also done important work on hydromagnetic waves and rotating gaseous masses.

== Short Biography ==
Name	Professor SK Trehan (Professor Surindar Kumar Trehan)	
	Gender (M/F)	Male
	Birth (DD-MM-YY)	04-04-1931
	Specialization	Mathematics
	Year of Election	1976
	Demise	09-09-2004

Summary
Surindar Kumar Trehan obtained PhD (1958) from University of Chicago, USA. He was Dean, Science Faculty, and CSIR Professor Emeritus, Department of Mathematics, both at Punjab University, Chandigarh (1980–82, 1989). Academic and Research Achievements: Trehan made significant contributions to our understanding of the stability of force- free magnetic fields, of jets and cylinders, and of inhomogenous plasmas. His work on the mathematical treatment of gaseous polytropes in the presence of a magnetic field was noted with keen interest. He also made contributions to the study of hydromagnetic waves and rotating gaseous masses. He carried out nonlinear studies in magnetohydrodynamics. He provided, for the first time, a consistent account of the modulational stability of bounded systems taking into account the boundary conditions consistently. Other Contributions: Dr Trehan served on many expert committees of CSIR, UGC, etc.; Governing Council of Indian Statistical Institute and Indian Association for the Cultivation of Science (The links indicated in red refers to " not created yet"); and Member, INSA Council (1977–79). He was also Editor, Bulletin of the Astronomical Society of India (1980–91); Member, Editorial boards of: Journal of Astrophysics and Astronomy, and some other journals; and Editor of INSA Publications (1979–82). Awards and Honours: Dr Trehan received the SS Bhatnagar Prize (1976); BC Roy Award `Eminent Person in Sciences’ (1989); UGC National Lecturer (1977–78); and UGC National Fellow (1983). He was elected Fellow of the Indian Academy of Sciences, Bangalore and National Academy of Sciences (India), Allahabad; Chairman, National Committee for the International Astronomical Union (1978–81); Vice President, Astronomical Society of India (1976–78); and President, Mathematics Section, Indian Science Congress (1984). ^{[2]}

Please note that the authorization of this article belongs to www.insaindia.res only.

Reference :

https://www.insaindia.res.in/detail.php?id=N76-0843
