= CIAA =

CIAA may refer to:

- Cayman Islands Athletic Association, the governing body for the sport of athletics in the Cayman Islands
- Central Intercollegiate Athletic Association, an NCAA Division II collegiate athletic conference
- Confederation of the Food and Drink Industries of the EU, a European trade organization
- Confederation of Indian Amateur Astronomer Association
- Conference on Implementation and Application of Automata, an international academic conference in computer science
- confidentiality, integrity and availability plus authenticity - the protection goals triad in information security extended to a quartet, see also: CIA triad
- Cook Inlet Aquaculture Association, a non-profit organization promoting sustainable salmon fishing in Alaska
- Office of the Coordinator of Inter-American Affairs, the U.S. government office led by the Coordinator of Inter-American Affairs
- Comisión Investigadora de Accidentes de Aviación, Dominican Republic aviation accident investigation authority
- Commission for the Investigation of Abuse of Authority, an apex constitutional body for corruption control for the Government of Nepal
