= Astronomical Society of India =

Learned society in India, of professional astronomers

The Astronomical Society of India (ASI) is an Indian society of professional astronomers and other professionals from related disciplines. It was founded in 1972, with Vainu Bappu being the founder president of the society, and as of 2010 has a membership of approximately 1000. Its registered office is at the Astronomy Department, Osmania University, Hyderabad, India. Its primary objective is the promotion of Astronomy and related branches of science. It organises meetings, supports and tries to popularise Astronomy and related subjects and publishes the Bulletin of the Astronomical Society of India.

Prof. Dipankar Banerjee, director of Aryabhatta Research Institute of Observational Sciences, Nainital, is the society's president.

The Society makes a series of awards, the most prestigious of which is the Prof. M. K. Vainu Bappu Gold Medal awarded once every two years to "honour exceptional contributions to Astronomy and Astrophysics by young scientists anywhere in the world." Previous award winners include:

- 1986 Yasuo Fukui
- 1988 George Efstathiou and Shrinivas Kulkarni
- 1990 D. J. Saikia and Dipankar Bhattacharya
- 1992 Pawan Kumar
- 1994 Matthew Colless
- 1996 Sarbani Basu
- 1998 Peter Martinez
- 2000 Biswajit Paul and Alycia J. Weinberger
- 2002 Brian P. Schmidt
- 2004 R. Srianand and Ray Jayawardhana
- 2006 Banibrata Mukhopadhyay
- 2008 Niayesh Afshordi and Nissim Kanekar
- 2010 Marta Burgay and Parampreet Singh

The society also runs two prestigious lectures: the Modali Endowment Lecture and the R. C. Gupta Endowment Lecture.

== Previous Organisation ==
A previous organisation of the same name existed between July 1910 and circa 1922. It was founded to promote astronomy following an appearance of Halley’s Comet. Initially there was strong support for such a society and by 30 September 1911 there were 239 members (192 original and a net 47 added during the first session). The society was run along similar lines to the British Astronomical Association. Sections were formed for general observation, meteors, Earth’s Moon and variable stars, experts were appointed to advise on instrumental matters and photography. A library was established. The society was based in Calcutta and nearby Barrackpore. Sidney Gerald Burrard and John Evershed were vice presidents. However the organisation faded to obscurity following the departure from India of one of the principal members, Herbert Gerard Tomkins.

== Publications ==
- Bulletin of the Astronomical Society of India

== See also ==
- Akash Mitra Mandal
- List of astronomical societies
