= List of astronomical societies =

Overview of the world's astronomical societies

These are learned societies, both amateur and professional, that are primarily focused on the science and history of astronomy. They are often devoted to promoting astronomy research and education, and many publish their own journals or newsletters.

== International ==
- International Astronomical Union (IAU)
- International Meteor Organization
- Network for Astronomy School Education
- The Planetary Society

== Africa ==
- Astronomical Society of Southern Africa
- Sirius Astronomy Association, Constantine, Algeria

== Asia ==
=== Brunei Darussalam ===
- The Astronomical Society of Brunei Darussalam (PABD)

=== China ===
- Hong Kong Astronomical Society

=== India ===
- Akash Mitra Mandal
- Astronomical Society of India
- Bangalore Astronomical Society (BAS)
- Confederation of Indian Amateur Astronomers
- Khagol Mandal
- Khagol Vishwa
- Association of Friends of Astronomy, Goa

=== Turkey ===
- SpaceTurk

=== Thailand ===
- Astronomy Thailand

=== United Arab Emirates ===
- Dubai Astronomy Group

== Europe ==
- European Astronomical Society

=== Denmark ===
- Danish Astronomical Society

=== France ===
- Société astronomique de France
- Société Française d'Astronomie et d'Astrophysique (SF2A)

=== Germany ===
- Astronomische Gesellschaft
- Vereinigung der Sternfreunde

=== Greece ===
- Hellenic Astronomical Society

=== Ireland ===
- Irish Astronomical Society
- Irish Federation of Astronomical Societies

=== Italy ===
- Unione Astrofili Italiani

=== Norway ===
- Norwegian Astronomical Society
- CV-Helios Network

=== Poland ===
- Polish Astronomical Society

=== Russia ===
- Russian Astronomical Society (1891-1932)
- Астрономо-геодезическое объединение
- Eurasian Astronomical Society (1990-)

=== Serbia ===
- Astronomical Society Ruđer Bošković

=== Slovakia ===
- ADL astronomical society

=== Sweden ===
- Swedish Astronomical Society

=== United Kingdom ===
- Airdrie Astronomical Association
- Astronomical Society of Edinburgh
- Astronomical Society of Glasgow
- British Astronomical Association
- Crayford Manor House Astronomical Society
- Federation of Astronomical Societies
- Kielder Observatory Astronomical Society
- Liverpool Astronomical Society
- Loughton Astronomical Society
- Manchester Astronomical Society
- Mexborough & Swinton Astronomical Society
- Northumberland Astronomical Society
- Nottingham Astronomical Society
- Preston and District Astronomical Society
- Royal Astronomical Society
- Society for Popular Astronomy
- Society for the History of Astronomy

== North America ==
=== Canada ===
- Astronomy North
- Canadian Astronomical Society
- Royal Astronomical Society of Canada
- Société d'astronomie de Montréal

=== Mexico ===
- Nibiru Sociedad Astronómica

=== United States ===
- Amateur Astronomers Association of Pittsburgh
- American Astronomical Society (AAS)
- American Meteor Society
- Association of Lunar and Planetary Observers
- Astronomical League
- Astronomical Society of the Pacific
- Indiana Astronomical Society
- Kopernik Astronomical Society
- Milwaukee Astronomical Society
- Mohawk Valley Astronomical Society
- Southern Cross Astronomical Society
- Warren Astronomical Society

List of Local Astronomy Clubs In the United States:
Society Name	City	State	Address	Website	Facebook Page	AL Member
Auburn Astronomical Society	Auburn	Alabama		http://www.auburnastro.org/		✓
East Valley Astronomy Club	Mesa	Arizona	P.O. Box 2202	http://www.evaconline.org		✓
Prescott Astronomy Club	Prescott	Arizona	Prescott Astronomy Club186 E. Sheldon St. #1122	https://prescottastronomyclub.org/		✓
Phoenix Astronomical Society, Inc.	Scottsdale	Arizona	7979 E Princess Dr	http://www.pasaz.org		✓
Huachuca Astronomy Club	Sierra Vista	Arizona	P.O Box 922	http://www.hacastronomy.org		✓
Tucson Amateur Astronomy Association	Tucson	Arizona	P. O. Box 41254	http://www.tucsonastronomy.org		✓
Sugar Creek Astronomical Society	Bentonville	Arkansas				✓
Kern County Astronomical Society	Bakersfield	California	5501 Stockdale Hwy #10241	https://www.kernastro.org		✓
Aerospace Employees Association Astronomy Club	El Segundo	California	2310 E El Segundo Blvd			✓
Astronomers of Humboldt	Eureka	California	P.O. Box 351	https://www.astrohum.org		✓
Temecula Valley Astronomers	Murrieta	California	P.O. Box 1292	https://www.temeculavalleyastronomers.com		✓
Eastbay Astronomical Society	Oakland	California	P.O. Box 18635, Oakland, CA 94619	https://www.eastbayastro.org	EAS Page	
Orange County Astronomers	Orange	California	P.O. Box 1762, Costa Mesa, CA 92628	https://www.ocastronomers.org/	OCA Page	
South Bay Astronomical Society	Redondo Beach	California	P.O. Box 1244	https://www.sbastro.net		✓
San Diego Astronomy Association	San Diego	California	PO Box 23215	https://sdaa.org/	SDAA Page	✓
TAC - AL (The Astronomy Connection)	San Jose	California				✓
Bear Valley Springs Astronomy Club	Tehachapi	California	23871 Lakeview Dr.	https://www.bvsac.org		✓
Tulare Astronomical Association	Tulare	California	1062 N. A. St.	https://tulareastro.org/		✓
Mt. Shasta Stargazers	Weed	California	134 Shasta Cove N	https://www.mtshastastargazers.com		✓
Colorado Springs Astronomical Society	Colorado Springs	Colorado	PO Box 16318	http://www.csastro.org		✓
Denver Astronomical Society	Denver	Colorado	P.O. Box 102738	http://www.denverastro.org		✓
Gunnison Valley Observatory	Gunnison	Colorado	P. O. Box 1227	https://www.gunnisonvalleyobservatory.org/		✓
Longmont Astronomical Society	Longmont	Colorado	P.O. Box 806	https://www.longmontastro.org		✓
Black Canyon Astronomical Society	Montrose	Colorado	27 N. Willerup Ave	https://blackcanyonastronomy.com/		✓
Shoreline Astronomical Society	Madison	Connecticut	83 Wildcat Rd	https://shorelineastronomicalsociety.blogspot.com/		✓
Litchfield Hills Amateur Astronomy Club	Morris	Connecticut	211 West St	https://www.LHastro.org		✓
Delaware Astronomical Society	Greenville	Delaware	Mount Cuba Obervatory1610 Hillside Mill Rd.	https://www.delastro.org		✓
National Capital Astronomers	Davidson	District of Columbia	3804 Wayson Road	http://www.capitalastronomers.org		✓
Local Group of Deep Sky Observers	Ellenton	Florida	5610 32nd Ave E.	http://www.LGDSO.com		✓
Alachua Astronomy Club	Gainesville	Florida	2603 NW 13th St., #161			✓
Northeast Florida Astronomical Society	Jacksonville	Florida	P.O. Box 5432	http://www.nefas.org		✓
Brevard Astronomical Society	Melbourne	Florida	PO Box 410092	https://www.brevardastro.org/		✓
Everglades Astronomical Society	Naples	Florida	270 Naples Cove Drive, Unit 3206	https://evergladesastronomicalsociety.org/		✓
Moonstruck Astronomy Club	Ocala	Florida		https://moonstruckastronomyclub.org/		✓
Central Florida Astronomical Society, Inc.	Oviedo	Florida	P.O. Box 620907	https://cfas.org		✓
Escambia Amateur Astronomers Assn.	Pensacola	Florida		https://sites.google.com/view/escambiaastronomers		✓
Tallahassee Astronomical Society	Tallahassee	Florida	PO Box 824	http://www.tallystargazers.org/		✓
Astronomical Society of the Palm Beaches	West Palm Beach	Florida	P.O. Box 19652	https://www.astropalmbeach.org		✓
Atlanta Astronomy Club, Inc.	Atlanta	Georgia	P. O. Box 76155	http://www.AtlantaAstronomy.org		✓
Flint River Astronomy Club	Brooks	Georgia	788 Rising Star Rd	http://www.flintriverastronomy.org/		✓
Hawaiian Astronomical Society	Honolulu	Hawaii	P.O. Box 17671	http://www.hawastsoc.org/		✓
Haleakala Amateur Astronomers	Kula	Hawaii				✓
Boise Astronomical Society	Boise	Idaho	P.O. Box 7002	http://www.boiseastro.org		✓
Idaho Falls Astronomical Society	Idaho Falls	Idaho	P.O. Box 50262	http://ifastro.org/		✓
Pocatello Astronomical Society	Pooctello	Idaho		https://pocatelloastronomicalsociety.com/		✓
Champaign-Urbana Astronomical Society	Champaign	Illinois	Staerkel Planetarium/Parkland College2400 West Bradley Avenue	https://www.cuas.org		✓
Rockford Amateur Astronomers, Inc.	Loves Park	Illinois	6691 Squire Ln.			✓
Twin City Amateur Astronomers, Inc.	Normal	Illinois	1109 N. Linden St.	https://www.tcaa.club/		✓
Popular Astronomy Club	Orion	Illinois	11 Deer Run Road	https://www.popularastronomyclub.org/		✓
Northwest Suburban Astronomers	Palatine	Illinois	PO Box 95462	https://www.nsaclub.org/		✓
Peoria Astronomical Society	Peoria	Illinois	PO BOX 10111	http://www.astronomical.org		✓
Fox Valley Sky Watchers	Sleepy Hollow	Illinois	164 Hilltop Lane			✓
Evansville Astronomical Society	Evansville	Indiana	P.O. Box 3474	http://evansvilleastro.org/		✓
Fort Wayne Astronomical Society	Fort Wayne	Indiana	PO Box 11093	https://www.fortwayneastronomicalsociety.com/		✓
Indiana Astronomical Society	Mooresville	Indiana	P.O. Box 703	http://www.iasindy.org		✓
Ames Area Amateur Astronomers	Ames	Iowa	P.O. Box 1961	http://www.amesastronomers.org/		✓
Des Moines Astronomical Society, Inc	Des Moines	Iowa	P.O. Box 111	http://www.dmastronomy.com		✓
Black Hawk Astronomy Club	Waterloo	Iowa	503 South Street			✓
Southeastern Iowa Astronomy Club	West Burlington	Iowa	PO Box 14			✓
Kansas Astronomical Observers	Goddard	Kansas	25000 W 39th S	http://www.kaowichita.com/		✓
Astronomy Associates of Lawrence	Lawrence	Kansas	1082 Malott Hall, 1251 Wescoe Hall Drive	https://astronaal.ku.edu/aboutaal		✓
Northeast Kansas Amateur Astronomer's League, Inc.	Topeka	Kansas	P.O. Box 951	http://www.nekaal.org		✓
West Kentucky Amateur Astronomers	Golden Pond	Kentucky	238 Visitor Center Drive		Public WKAA Group	✓
Louisville Astronomical Society	Louisville	Kentucky	P.O. Box 17554, Louisville, KY 40217	https://www.louisville-astro.org/	Society Page; Society Group	✓
Baton Rouge Astronomical Society	Baton Rouge	Louisiana		http://www.brastro.org/		✓
Shreveport-Bossier Astronomical Society	Shreveport	Louisiana	353 Ockley Drive	http://www.shreveportastronomy.com		✓
Southern Maine Astronomers	Brunswick	Maine	179 Neptune Drive,Suite 300	http://www.southernmaineastronomers.org		✓
Penobscot Valley Stargazers	Stockton Springs	Maine		http://www.gazers.org		✓
Howard Astronomical League of Central Maryland	Columbia	Maryland	8630-M Guilford RdSuite 211	http://www.howardastro.org		✓
Cumberland Astronomy Club	Frostburg	Maryland		http://www.cumberlandastronomyclub.org		✓
TriState Astronomers	Hagerstown	Maryland	823 Commonwealth Ave	https://www.tristateastronomers.org		✓
Westminster Astronomical Society	Westminster	Maryland	P.O. Box 1162	http://www.westminsterastro.org		✓
South Shore Astronomical Society, The	Norwell	Massachusetts	293 Pine Street	http://www.ssastros.org/testsite/index.html		✓
Oakland Astronomy Club	Auburn Hills	Michigan	P.O. Box 210554	http://www.oaklandastronomy.net		✓
Kalamazoo Astronomical Society	Kalamazoo	Michigan	600 West Vine Street, Suite 400	http://www.kasonline.org/		✓
Shoreline Amateur Astronomical Association	West Olive	Michigan	P.O. Box 201	http://www.holland-saaa.org/	https://www.facebook.com/ShorelineAstronomy	✓
Minnesota Astronomical Society	Minneapolis	Minnesota	P.O. Box 14931	http://www.mnastro.org	https://www.facebook.com/MinnesotaAstronomicalSociety	✓
Rochester Astronomy Club	Rochester	Minnesota	Box 513	http://www.rochesterskies.org		✓
Jackson Astronomical Association	Jackson	Mississippi	P.O. Box 12586		https://www.facebook.com/groups/jacksonastro/	✓
Springfield Astronomical Society	Springfield	Missouri		https://springfieldastronomy.org/		✓
St. Louis Astronomical Society	St. Louis	Missouri	13128 Cozyhill Drive	http://www.slasonline.org		✓
Astronomical Society of Eastern Missouri	Wentzville	Missouri	206 Old Chesapeake Dr	https://www.asemonline.org/	https://www.facebook.com/profile.php?id=100064380775869	✓
Yellowstone Valley Astronomy Association	Laurel	Montana	759 Clarks River Rd	https://yvaamt.com/		✓
Omaha Astronomical Society	Omaha	Nebraska	P.O. Box 34703	https://www.omahaastro.com/		✓
Keene Amateur Astronomers	Keene	New Hampshire	94 Pako Avenue	http://www.keeneastronomy.org		✓
New Hampshire Astronomical Society	Manchester	New Hampshire	P.O. Box 5823	http://www.nhastro.com		✓
Hopatcong Observatory Astronomy Club	Hopatcong	New Jersey		https://www.hopatcongobservatory.org		✓
South Jersey Astronomy Club	Millville	New Jersey		https://www.SJAC.us		✓
STAR Astronomy Society	Red Bank	New Jersey	P.O. Box 863	https://www.starastronomy.org		✓
Astronomical Society of Toms River Area	Toms River	New Jersey	Ocean County College Building # 13, 1 College Drive	http://www.astra-nj.org		✓
Albuquerque Astronomical Society	Albuquerque	New Mexico	P.O. Box 50581	https://www.taas.org		✓
Magdalena Astronomical Society	Magdalena	New Mexico	PO Box 125	http://magdalenaastronomicalsociety.org/		✓
Rio Rancho Astronomical Society	Rio Rancho	New Mexico	609 Valley Meadows Dr. NE	http://www.rrastro.org		✓
El Valle Astronomers	Taos	New Mexico	403 Valverde Commons Drive	https://elvalleastronomers.org/		✓
Buffalo Astronomical Association	Buffalo	New York		https://www.buffaloastronomy.com		✓
Mohawk Valley Astronomical Society	Clinton	New York	P.O. Box 52	http://mvas-ny.org		✓
Astronomical Society of Long Island	Huntington	New York	57 Conklin Lane	http://www.asliclub.org		✓
Amateur Observers' Society of New York	Mineola	New York	425 Horton Highway	http://www.aosny.org		✓
Astronomy Section of the Rochester Academy of Science	Rochester	New York	P.O. Box 20292	https://www.rochesterastronomy.org/		✓
Custer Institute	Southold	New York	1115 Main Bayview Rd.P. O. Box 1204	http://www.custerobservatory.org/		✓
Rockland Astronomy Club	Suffern	New York	225 Route 59c/o Challenger Center			✓
Westchester Amateur Astronomers	Valhalla	New York	P.O. Box 44	http://www.westchesterastronomers.org/		
Astronomy Club of Asheville	Asheville	North Carolina	75 St. Dunstan's Circle	http://www.astroasheville.org		✓
Cleveland County Astronomical Society	Boiling Springs	North Carolina		http://www.ccastro.org		✓
Chapel Hill Astronomical and Observational Soc.	Chapel Hill	North Carolina	P.O. Box 3001	https://chaosastro.org/		✓
Raleigh Astronomy Club, Inc.	Raleigh	North Carolina		https://raleighastro.org/		✓
Cape Fear Astronomy Club	Wilmington	North Carolina	P.O. Box 7685	http://www.capefearastro.org		✓
Miami Valley Astronomical Society	Beavercreek	Ohio	P.O. Box 340896	http://www.mvas.org		✓
Richland Astronomical Society	Bellville	Ohio	P.O. Box 700	http://www.wro.org		✓
Chagrin Valley Astronomical Society	Chagrin Falls	Ohio	15735 Huntley RoadPO Box 11	https://www.cvas.space/		✓
Cincinnati Astronomical Society	Cleves	Ohio	5274 Zion Rd	http://www.cinastro.org		✓
Millstream Astronomy Club	Findlay	Ohio	2019 Sterling Court			✓
Lima Astronomical Society	Lima	Ohio	P.O. Box 201	https://limaastro com		✓
Toledo Astronomical Association	Sylvania	Ohio	4815 New England Lane, Apt. 4	http://toledoastronomy.org		✓
Stillwater Stargazers		Ohio		https://stillwaterstargazers.com/		✓
Bartlesville Astronomical Society	Bartlesville	Oklahoma	P.O. Box 302	https://sites.google.com/site/bartlesvilleastronomyclub/		✓
Broken Arrow Sidewalk Astronomer	Broken Arrow	Oklahoma	829 W. Vicksburg Street			✓
Oklahoma City Astronomy Club	Oklahoma City	Oklahoma	P. O. Box 22804	http://www.okcastroclub.com		✓
Odyssey Astronomy Club	Tribbey	Oklahoma	30222 Slaughterville Rd.			✓
Astronomy Club of Tulsa	Tulsa	Oklahoma	P. O. Box 470611	http://www.astrotulsa.com		✓
Eugene Astronomical Society	Eugene	Oregon	P.O. box 50395	http://www.eugeneastro.org		✓
Rose City Astronomers	Portland	Oregon	1945 SE Water Ave	http://www.rosecityastronomers.org		✓
Umpqua Astronomers	Roseburg	Oregon	604 Woodoak Drive			✓
Southern Oregon Skywatchers	Talent	Oregon	1557 Summer Place	https://www.orskywatchers.org/		✓
Starlight Astronomy Club	Altoona	Pennsylvania	702 Garden Street	http://www.starlightastronomyclub.org		✓
Bucks-Mont Astronomical Association	Ambler	Pennsylvania	411 Susquehanna Rd	http://blog.bma2.org		✓
Chesmont Astronomical Society	Exton	Pennsylvania	PMB 218256 Eagleview Blvd	http://www.chesmontastro.org		✓
Amateur Astronomers Association of Pittsburgh	Glenshaw	Pennsylvania	P.O. Box 314	http://www.3ap.org		✓
Delaware Valley Amateur Astronomers	Hatfield	Pennsylvania	301 Logan Drive	http://www.dvaa.org		✓
Astronomy Enthusiasts of Lancaster County	Lititz	Pennsylvania	325 Rudy Dam Road	http://www.aelc.us		✓
Oil Region Astronomical Society, Inc.	Oil City	Pennsylvania	P.O. Box 1535	http://www.oras.org		✓
Central Pennsylvania Observers	State College	Pennsylvania	345 Ridge Ave	http://www.cpoclub.org		✓
Chester County Astronomical Society	West Chester	Pennsylvania	988 Meadowview Ln	http://www.ccas.us		✓
Astronomy Club of Augusta	Aiken	South Carolina	1430 Morningside Drive	https://www.astroclubaugusta.weebly.com		✓
Lowcountry Stargazers	Charleston	South Carolina	P.O. Box 14453	https://www.lowcountrystargazers.org		✓
Midlands Astronomy Club, Inc.	Columbia	South Carolina	P.O. Box 2527	http://midlandsastronomyclub.org/		✓
Grand Strand Astronomers	Conway	South Carolina	1771 Alford Road	https://www.gsastro.org		✓
Barnard Astronomical Society	Chattanooga	Tennessee		https://barnardastronomy.org/		✓
Astronomy in the Parks Society	Hendersonville	Tennessee	150 Roberta Dr			✓
Bays Mountain Astronomy Club	Kingsport	Tennessee	Bays Mountain Park Association853 Bays Mountain Park Road	https://www.baysmountain.com/astronomy/astronomy-club/		✓
Smoky Mountain Astronomical Society	Maryville	Tennessee	3433 Ridgeway Trail	http://www.smokymtnastro.org/		✓
Fort Worth Astronomical Society	Fort Worth	Texas	5801 Trail Lake Drive	http://www.fortworthastro.com		✓
Hill Country Astronomers	Fredericksburg	Texas	P.O. Box 2043			✓
Psalm 19 Astronomy Society	Johnson City	Texas	1216 Byrd Ranch Road	https://www.psalm19astronomy.org		✓
North Houston Astronomy Club	Kingwood	Texas	P.O. Box 5043	http://www.astronomyclub.org/		✓
South Plains Astronomy Club	Lubbock	Texas	3521 50th StSpace 8	http://southplainsastronomy.org		✓
West Texas Astronomers	Midland	Texas	P.O. Box 3284			✓
Texas Astronomical Society of Dallas	Richardson	Texas	P. O Box 830742	http://www.texasastro.org		✓
Houston Astronomical Society	Spring	Texas	P.O. Box 131282	http://www.astronomyhouston.org		✓
Salt Lake Astronomical Society	Tooele	Utah	472 Country Club	https://www.slas.us		✓
Springfield Telescope Makers	Springtfield	Vermont	P. O. Box 601	http://stellafane.org		✓
Charlottesville Astronomical Society	Charlottesville	Virginia		http://www.cvilleastro.com		✓
Echo Ridge Astronomical Society	Elk Creek	Virginia	766 Echo Ridge Lane			✓
Rappahannock Astronomy Club	Fredericksburg	Virginia	P. O. Box 752	http://www.raclub.org		✓
Shenandoah Astronomical Society	Front Royal	Virginia	168 Hatcher Drive			✓
Northern Virginia Astronomy Club	Oakton	Virginia	P.O. Box 3452	http://www.novac.com		✓
Richmond Astronomical Society	Powhatan	Virginia	1385 Quarter Mill Ct	http://www.richastro.org		✓
Blue Ridge Astronomy Club	Red House	Virginia	P.O. Box 70	https://www.BlueRidgeAstro.com		✓
Back Bay Amateur Astronomers	Virginia Beach	Virginia	P.O. Box 9877	http://www.backbayastro.org/		✓
Battle Point Astronomical Association	Bainbridge Island	Washington	P. O. Box 10914	http://www.bpastro.org		✓
Whatcom Association of Celestial Observers	Ferndale	Washington	P. O. Box 1721	https://www.whatcomastronomy.com/		✓
Friends of Galileo	Longview	Washington	1632 22nd Ave			✓
Everett Astronomical Society	Mill Creek	Washington	P.O. Box 13272	http://everettastro.org/		✓
Island County Astronomical Society	Oak Harbor	Washington	PO Box 325	http://www.icas-wa.org/		✓
Seattle Astronomical Society	Seattle	Washington	P. O. Box 31746	http://www.seattleastro.org		✓
Olympic Astronomical Society	SIlverdale	Washington	9689 Clipper Pl NW	http://www.olympicastronomicalsociety.org		✓
Spokane Astronomical Society	Spokane	Washington	P. O. Box 8114	http://www.spokaneastronomical.org/		✓
Yakima Valley Astronomical Society	Yakima	Washington	505 Santa Roza Dr #B	https://www.yakimavalleyastro.org/		✓
Central Appalachian Astronomy Club	Bridgeport	West Virginia	324 Bartlett Ave	http://www.caacwv.com		✓
Kanawha Valley Astronomical Society	Charleston	West Virginia	P.O. Box 2132	https://www.kvas.org		✓
Chippewa Valley Astronomical Society	Eau Claire	Wisconsin	PO Box 1713	http://www.cvastro.org		✓
Wehr Astronomical Society	Franklin	Wisconsin	9701 W College Ave			✓
Northern Cross Science Foundation	Grafton	Wisconsin	2292 Ridgewood Road	http://www.ncsf.info		✓
Sheboygan Astronomical Society, Inc.	Kohler	Wisconsin	P.O. Box 292	http://www.shebastro.org/		✓
Iowa County Astronomers	Lone Rock	Wisconsin	1014 Fairview Court	http://www.icastro.org/		✓
Madison Astronomical Society	Madison	Wisconsin	P.O. Box 5585	https://madisonastro.org/		✓
Milwaukee Astronomical Society	New Berlin	Wisconsin		http://www.milwaukeeastro.org/		✓
Northeast Wisconsin Stargazers	Sherwood	Wisconsin	P.O. Box 267	https://www.new-star.org		✓
Warren Astronomical Society	Warren	Michigan	P.O. Box 1505	https://warrenastro.org/	https://www.facebook.com/warrenastro	✓

== Oceania ==
=== Australia ===
- Astronomical Society of Australia
- Astronomical Society of New South Wales
- Astronomical Society of South Australia
- Astronomical Society of Victoria
- Macarthur Astronomical Society
- Snake Valley Astronomical Association
- Sutherland Astronomical Society

=== New Zealand ===
- Dunedin Astronomical Society
- Royal Astronomical Society of New Zealand
- Whakatane Astronomical Society

== South America ==
=== Brazil ===
- Sociedade Astronômica Brasileira

== See also ==
- Amateur astronomy organizations by name
- Astronomy organizations by name
