= Michele Bannister =

New Zealand astrophysicist, science communicator

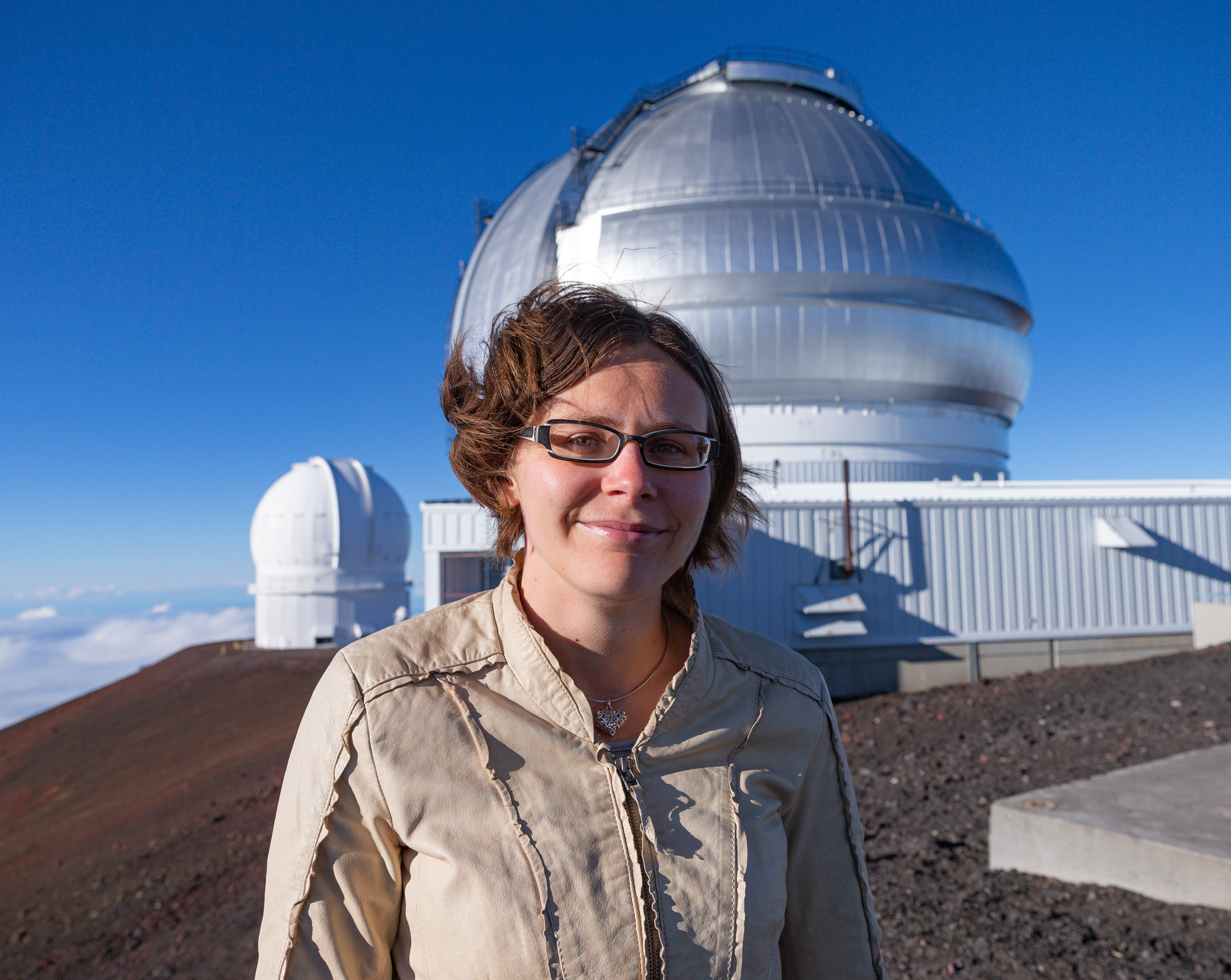
- Bannister in front of the Gemini North telescope on Hawai'i
- Born: 1986 (age 39–40)
- Education: Australian National University; University of Canterbury
- Scientific career
- Workplaces: University of Canterbury (BS); Australian National University (PhD); University of Victoria; Queen's University Belfast
- Thesis: Bright trans-Neptunian objects in the southern sky (2014)
- Doctoral advisor: Paul J. Francis, Brian Schmidt, Michael Brown
- Website: www.astro.uvic.ca/~micheleb/

Michele Bannister (born 1986) is a New Zealand planetary astronomer and science communicator at the University of Canterbury, who has participated in surveying the outermost Solar System for trans-Neptunian objects.

== Early life and education ==
Bannister is from Waitara, New Zealand. She attended Waitara High School, where she won the Korean War Essay Competition. She studied astronomy and geology at the University of Canterbury, graduating in 2007 with first class honours. She spent nine weeks working in the McMurdo Dry Valleys. Before starting her PhD she completed a summer school in Castel Gandolfo. She earned her PhD in 2014, working on trans-Neptunian objects at the Australian National University. She searched for new dwarf planets at the Uppsala Southern Schmidt Telescope. The telescope survived the Warrumbungles fire which destroyed twelve properties in Coonabarabran. Whilst at Australian National University she played in the Flying Disc team.

== Research and career ==
In 2014 she was co-investigator on the COLours for the Outer Solar System Origins Survey (OSSOS). She was appointed a postdoctoral fellow at the University of Victoria and the National Research Council (Canada) in 2013. Whilst at the University of Victoria she discovered a trans-Neptunian object (2015 RR245) with the Canada–France–Hawaii Telescope. 2015 RR245 is near the Kuiper belt. She played for a local Ultimate team, and published poetry.

In August 2016 she joined Queen's University Belfast. She is on the Science Team of the Maunakea Spectroscopic Explorer. She was involved with the observation of ʻOumuamua, an interstellar object from another solar system that passed through our own in 2017. She studied the brightness of ʻOumuamua and presented the colour composite image. 10463 Bannister was named after her in 2017. In 2020 she returned to her alma mater, the University of Canterbury as a lecturer in astrophysics.

== Public engagement ==
Bannister is a popular science communicator, and has spoken at the Royal Society, The Planetary Society, SETI Institute, Irish Astronomical Society and European Astrofest. In 2013 she was a curator on the RealScientists channel. She reported on the images coming in from Pluto during the spacecraft flyby on Radio New Zealand and Nature in 2015.

She discussed astronomy on Canadian radio station CFAX between 2015 and 2016. She appeared on the BBC Sky at Night in 2017 and 2018. She has written for The Conversation and The Planetary Society magazine, as well as contributing to Scientific American, Newsweek, National Geographic New Scientist, Slate and The Guardian.

== Awards and honors ==
Asteroid 10463 Bannister, discovered by Eleanor Helin and Schelte Bus at the Siding Spring Observatory in 1979, was named in her honor. The official naming citation was published by the Minor Planet Center on 13 April 2017 (M.P.C. 103975).

== Works ==
- Godfrey, Myfanwy J., Michele T. Bannister, D. Nobes, and Ronald S. Sletten. "3D time-lapse imaging of polygonal patterned ground in the McMurdo dry valleys of Antarctica." (2008).
- Fitzsimmons, Alan, Colin Snodgrass, Ben Rozitis, Bin Yang, Méabh Hyland, Tom Seccull, Michele T. Bannister, Wesley C. Fraser, Robert Jedicke, and Pedro Lacerda. "Spectroscopy and thermal modelling of the first interstellar object 1I/2017 U1 ʻOumuamua." Nature Astronomy 2, no. 2 (2018): 133.
- Bannister, Michele T., Megan E. Schwamb, Wesley C. Fraser, Michael Marsset, Alan Fitzsimmons, Susan D. Benecchi, Pedro Lacerda et al. "Col-OSSOS: colors of the interstellar planetesimal 1I/Oumuamua." arXiv preprint arXiv:1711.06214 (2017).
