= Nibiru =

Nibiru may refer to:

- Nibiru (Babylonian astronomy), a term in Akkadian language for a crossing or equinox
- Nibiru, a fictional planet in Star Trek Into Darkness
- Nibiru, a hypothetical planet, proposed by Zecharia Sitchin
- Nibiru cataclysm, a supposed impending disastrous encounter between Earth and a large astronomical object
- Nibiru (album), a 2019 album by Ozuna, and its title track
- NiBiRu: Age of Secrets, a 2005 computer adventure game

== See also ==
- Nibiru Sociedad Astronómica ('Nibiru Astronomical Society'), at the National Autonomous University of Mexico
- Neberu, fictional characters in Demon: The Fallen
- "Land of Nibiru", a song by Aminata Savadogo from the 2015 album Inner Voice
