= Knut Jørgen Røed Ødegaard =

Norwegian astronomer

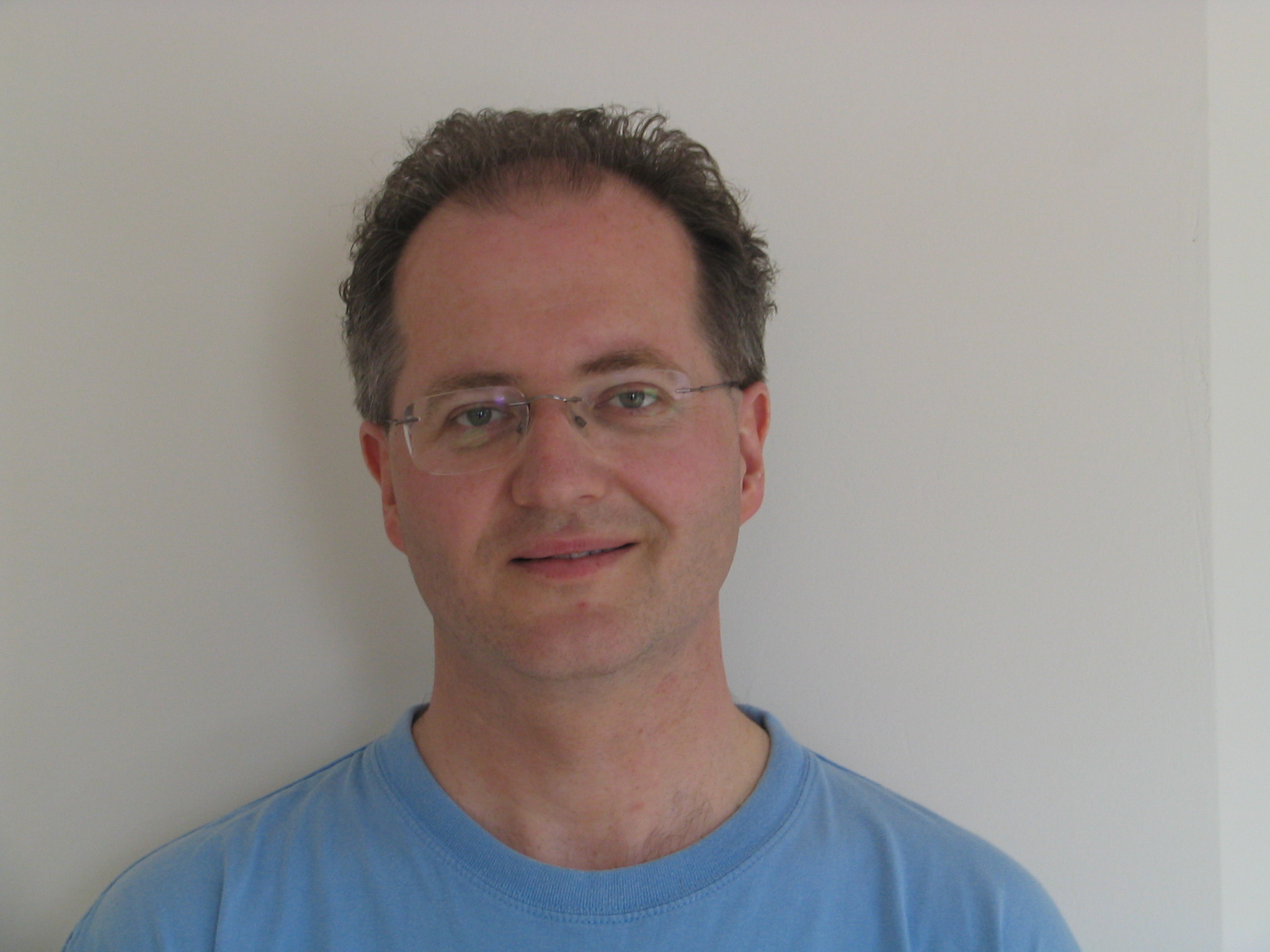
- Born: 6 May 1966 (age 60)
- Education: University of Oslo
- Known for: Popularising astronomy

Knut Jørgen Røed Ødegaard (born 6 May 1966) is a Norwegian astronomer formerly employed as a media contact at the University of Oslo's Institute of Theoretical Astrophysics. He was the leader of the Norwegian Astronomical Society (2005–2008), and is also manager of the Harestua Solar Observatory.

His enthusiasm for astronomy has made him a popular interview object in Norwegian media for events such as the 2004 Transit of Venus and the 2005 landing of the Huygens probe on Titan, and for astronomy in general towards the general population.
