= Shilowa =

Shilowa may refer to:

- Mbhazima Shilowa (born 1958), South African politician
- Maria Zhilova (1870-1934), Russian astronomer; the spelling Shilowa was used in naming an asteroid after her
