= IFAS =

IFAS may refer:

- Institute of Food and Agricultural Sciences at University of Florida
- Integrated Fixed-Film Activated Sludge, a sewage treatment process
- International French adjectival system, a grading system used in mountaineering
- Irish Federation of Astronomical Societies
- Institute for Advanced Studies, an education organization
- Indian Frontier Administrative Service, created in 1954 and merged into Indian Administrative Service in 1968, see Civil Services of India § Central Services
