= Maria Shilova =

Maria Shilova may refer to:

- Maria Kechkina (born 1986, née Shilova), Russian orienteer and ski-orienteer
- Maria Zhilova (18170-1934), Russian astronomer
