= Astronomy Ireland =

Irish astronomy organisation

- Formation: 1990
- Type: Astronomy Society
- Location: Ireland
- Leader: David Moore
- Website: https://astronomy.ie

Astronomy Ireland is an astronomy association based in Ireland (including the Republic and Northern Ireland). It is a non-profit educational organisation founded by David Moore.

== History ==
Astronomy Ireland (AI) was founded in Dublin in 1990 by David Moore and others following a split from the Irish Astronomical Society.

=== Legal troubles ===
In 2024, the organisation was ordered by the Workplace Relations Commission to pay a former administrator €2,153.88 for multiple breaches by Astronomy Ireland of the Terms of Employment (Information) Act 1994.

The following year, in yet another hearing before the Workplace Commission, another former manager of the organisation alleged bullying, harassment, a toxic workplace, and "serious financial irregularities" at the organisation. Finding David Moore personally liable, the Commission awarded the claimant €10,784.60 for breaches by Astronomy Ireland of the Unfair Dismissals Act 1977, and other employment rights breaches.

== Activities ==
- Observing sessions: Eclipses of the moon, meteor showers, favourable planetary apparitions, and other events. In Dublin, a common meeting place is beside the Papal Cross in the Phoenix Park.
- Lectures: These are recorded by the society and are made available on for download and via DVD. Astrophysicist Chris Lintott and science writer John Gribbin have delivered lectures.
- Star-B-Q: Annual barbecue held at Roundwood, County Wicklow.
- Astro-Expo: Annual astronomy and science exhibition held in Dublin.
- Astronomy Classes: Introduces new members and non-members to elementary and advanced astronomy.
- Foreign trips: Arranged to observe total solar eclipses. Turkey was visited in 2006.

== Publications and media ==
Members are kept up-to-date by e-mail newsletters and text messages. A premium rate telephone news service alerts Irish and British astronomers to celestial events, ranging from flyovers of the International Space Station to meteor showers.

Astronomy Ireland produces a monthly magazine called "Astronomy Ireland" which is aimed mainly at amateur astronomers.

A weekly radio programme, AIRS (Astronomy Ireland Radio Show), is broadcast every Tuesday on FM radio and on the Internet. Previous shows are available from the MP3 archive on the club's website, along with recordings of other radio programmes.

== Astronomy Shop ==
A private venture called the Astronomy Shop was owned and managed by the company's director, David Moore. This shop was liquidated in 2013. The company Astronomy & Space Ltd. was dissolved in 2015.

== See also ==
- List of astronomical societies
