= Minnesota Astronomical Society =

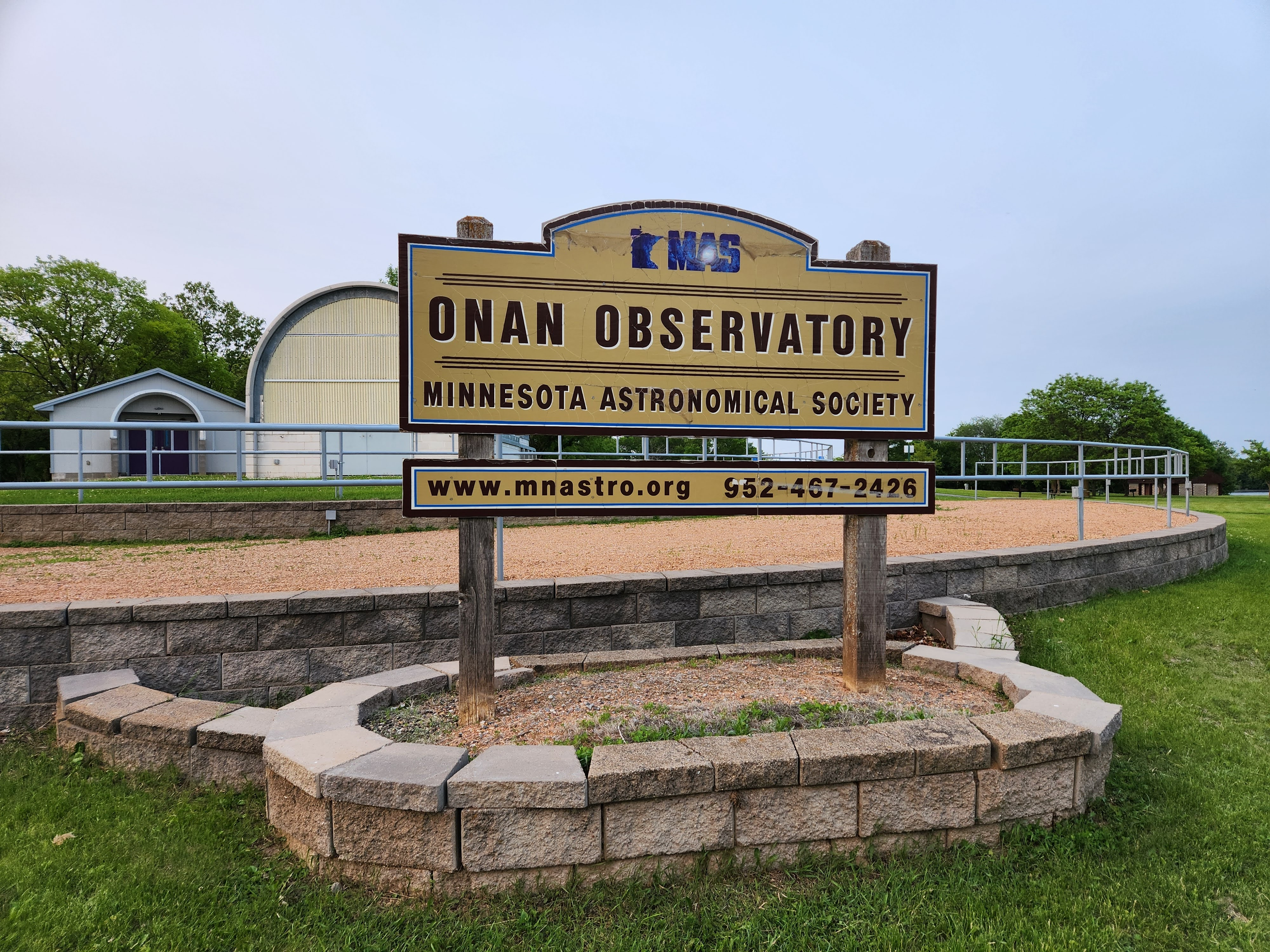
- The Onan Observatory Sign, seen in 2025
- Formation: November 21, 1972
- Founded at: Science Museum of Minnesota
- Type: Nonprofit astronomical society
- Tax ID no.: 501(c)(3)
- Purpose: Education, Amateur Astronomy
- Region served: Minnesota
- Fields: Astronomy
- Members: 650+ (2026)
- President: Valts Treibergs
- Vice President: John Zimitsch
- Secretary: Claire Weaverling
- Treasurer: Noha Reda
- Publication: Gemini
- Website: www.mnastro.org
- Formerly called: Twin Cities Astronomical Society

The Minnesota Astronomical Society (MAS) is a non-profit astronomical society based in Minnesota. It is one of only two astronomical societies based in the state, the other being the Rochester Astronomy Club.

== History ==
It began as an association of 3M employees who formed a company astronomy club. In 1972, it broke off and became an independent organization under the name 'Twin Cities Astronomy Club'. The name was changed to 'Minnesota Astronomical Society' in 1980. The MAS opened their first permanent location to the public, Eagle Lake Observatory, in 2000. In 2021, membership was reported as greater than 450. In 2026, Membership had grown to over 650.

== Locations ==
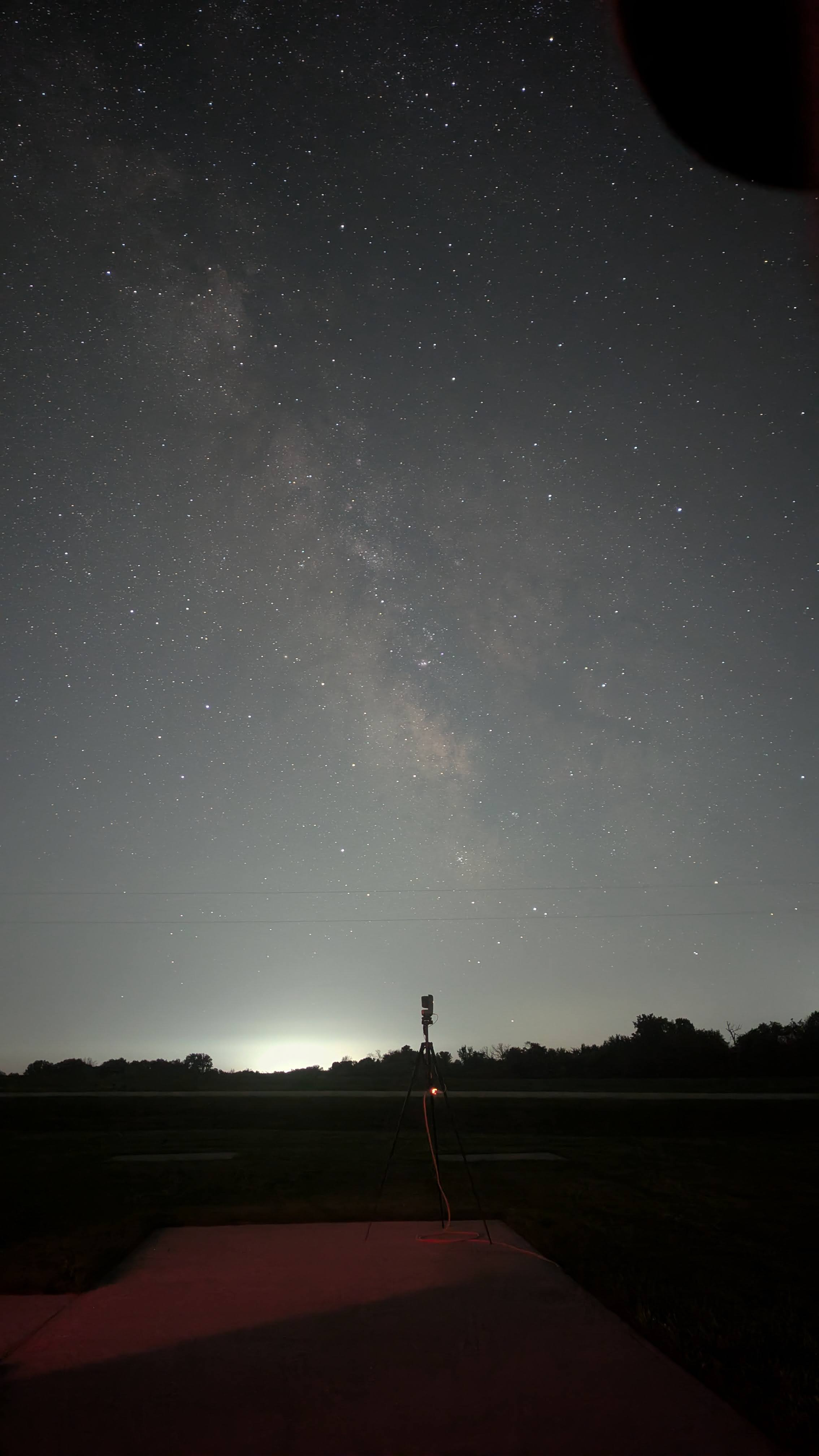
The sky at Cherry Grove Observatory, looking south, July 2026

The MAS operates three observatories. The first, and oldest, is Eagle Lake Observatory. It is located at Baylor Regional Park, in Camden Township. The nearest town is Norwood Young America, to the south. The observatory contains three buildings; the Onan Observatory, the Sylvia A. Casby Observatory, and the HotSpot Classroom. The first two hosted their first star party in 2000, while the classroom opened in 2013.

The Cherry Grove Observatory, near Kenyon, MN, was next opened and became the MAS's first dedicated dark-sky site. The Joseph J Casby Observatory, in Afton, MN, opened in 2010.

The MAS also owns land they use for events in Palisade, MN and West Lakeland Township, MN.
