= Nottingham Astronomical Society =

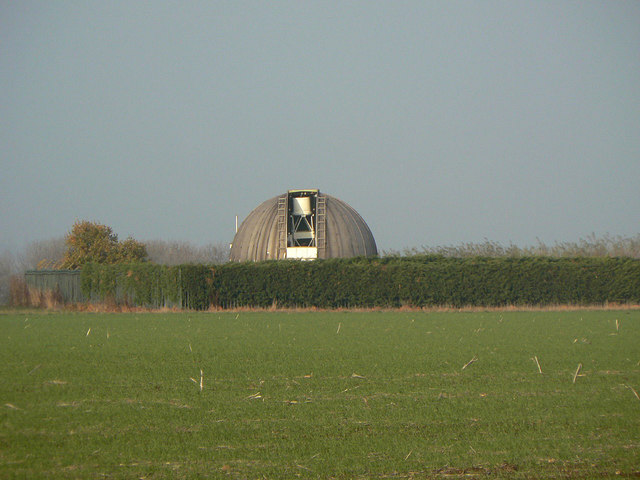
Cotgrave observatory: dome of the 24" telescope

The Nottingham Astronomical Society was established in 1946.

== History ==
There is some evidence for a society for people interested in astronomy in the Nottingham area in the nineteen-twenties.

The society owns a 24" reflecting telescope housed in a dome observatory near Cotgrave, Nottinghamshire.

Since 1980 the society has been twinned with the Karlruhe Astronomical Society (Astronomischen Vereinigung Karlsruhe, AOD) based in Germany.

== See also ==
- List of astronomical societies
