= Crayford Manor House Astronomical Society =

Crayford Manor House Astronomical Society is a local astronomy group established in 1961. It was once based in the historic Crayford Manor House, but since 2012 is in Sutton-at-Hone, Kent. The new location has an observatory called the Dick Chambers Sutton-at-Hone Observatory with a 16-inch telescope. The society meets weekly for observing sessions as well as lectures and other activities.

== Publications ==
Members of the society have published many papers, including papers in the Journal of the British Astronomical Association, the Monthly Notices of the Royal Astronomical Society, Astronomy Now, Sky & Telescope, Practical Astronomy, The Observatory, and IBVS (Information Bulletin on Variable Stars).

Society members have also produced a number of shorter articles and book reviews.

== See also ==
- List of astronomical societies
