= Whakatane Astronomical Society =

Astronomical society in Whakatāne, New Zealand

- Formation: January 1, 1963; 63 years ago
- Type: NGO
- Location: Hurinui Avenue, Hillcrest, Whakatāne, New Zealand
- Coordinates: 37.956642°S 176.999544°E
- Region served: Eastern Bay of Plenty, New Zealand
- President: Norman Izett
- Affiliations: Royal Astronomical Society of New Zealand

The Whakatane Astronomical Society is a voluntary, non-profit society for people interested in amateur astronomy in the Whakatāne District of New Zealand. The society was founded in September 1960, and maintains a small observatory in Whakatane, which has been operating continuously since 1964. The society is affiliated with the Royal Astronomical Society of New Zealand.

The Society's main fund-raising activity is the running of observing nights on Tuesday and Friday evenings, where members of the public pay a small fee to view the sky using one or more of the society's telescopes at the observatory, under the guidance of a society member. Similar evenings can also be run for larger/school groups, with prior arrangement.

== Equipment ==
The Society's observatory houses three main telescopes:

- A 350mm Celestron Schmidt-Cassegrain
- A 250mm Meade Instruments Schmidt-Cassegrain with GoTo Control
- A custom built 150mm refractor, equipped with a solar filter

== See also ==
- List of astronomical societies
- List of astronomical observatories
