= Shreveport-Bossier Astronomical Society =

- Abbreviation: SBAS
- Formation: 1959
- Legal status: non-profit Incorporated association
- Location: Shreveport, Louisiana, USA
- Coordinates: 32°19′11.11″N 93°37′17.43″W
- Publication: The Observer
- Website: www.shreveportastronomy.com

The Shreveport-Bossier Astronomical Society, Inc. is a 501(c)(3) tax-exempt organization and one of the oldest continuously meeting astronomy clubs in the United States of America. Originally named the Shreveport Junior Astronomical Society, it was founded in 1959 by a group of high school students led by a fellow student, Sara Worley. Fifteen people attended an organizational meeting to establish a club on October 10, 1959. Officers were elected at this meeting and Sara Worley became the first president of the Shreveport Junior Astronomical Society. A second organizational meeting took place on October 17, 1959, where a constitution and additional society-related details were established. The constitution was approved, signed, and ratified at a third meeting on October 24, 1959, although there was no State of Louisiana charter. The first public meeting of the club was held on November 14, 1959 at Centenary College of Louisiana. Two goals were announced: build an observatory and procure a planetarium for the Shreveport area. Within five years, these two goals were accomplished through local participation and fundraising.

To raise money, the club hosted stargazing events for the general public and received donations from area businesses. The club at one time had well over 100 members on its roster and grew as a result of the popularity of the NASA Space Program in the 1960s. Stargazing events were well attended. One stargazing event held at Youree Drive Junior High School on November 13, 1960 was estimated to have over 2,000 people in attendance. In 1963, the club became known as the Shreveport Astronomical Society to better represent its adult membership and transitioning away from a junior society. In 1964, the club leased and transformed an abandoned grain silo into an observatory. Later that year, the City of Shreveport dedicated the area’s first planetarium at the city’s fairgrounds.

In April 1971, a reorganization of the club took place by shifting focus from a club for high school students to a club for adults. Youths could become society members, but only those 16 years or older could hold office positions. On March 27, 1975 the club became the formal society it is known as today. Incorporation papers were signed on that day and a board of directors was created. The club eventually expanded its name to the Shreveport-Bossier Astronomical Society (SBAS) on April 3, 1996 alongside a dedication ceremony at a SBAS dark sky site in Bossier Parish provided by Bossier Parish Community College.

The observatory was originally named the Shreveport Observatory, and it was later renamed after a founding member, Ralph A. Worley, an avid amateur astronomer, oil executive, and Sara Worley’s father. The society continues to operate out of the Ralph A. Worley Observatory located about 8 miles south of the LSU-Shreveport campus off LA Highway 1 on LA Highway 175. In 2015, the society celebrated the 50th Anniversary of the Worley Observatory. Over that 50-year period, the SBAS has hosted thousands of members of the general public to view the night sky through telescopes and with the naked eye.

== Membership ==
Membership in the SBAS is open to anyone 10 years of age or older, but only those of at least 16 years of age may vote and hold office. Members of all ages may participate in society activities. The society currently has a membership of more than 80 people. Society members contribute to the hobby of amateur astronomy via articles in astronomy publications, variable star observing, asteroid occultations, Astronomical League observing programs, and outreach events. Members also receive a subscription to the Astronomical League's publication, The Reflector.

== Meetings ==
Meetings are held at Louisiana State University in Shreveport on the third Saturday of every month in the Science Lecture Auditorium. Each meeting begins with a discussion of society business affairs followed by refreshments and good fellowship. The official astronomy program follows the business meeting. The December meeting is usually devoted to a club-only Christmas party.

== Events ==
Stargazing events open to the public are held six times a year: three in the spring and three in the fall, as well as daytime solar observing events throughout the year. The SBAS also coordinates with the Sci-Port Planetarium, American Rose Center, Broadmoor Branch Library, and LSU-Shreveport.

== Publications ==
The society distributes a monthly newsletter named The Observer which features articles, member astrophotography, and announcements.

== Officers & Committees ==
President, Vice President, Secretary/Treasurer, SBAS Board, Worley Committee, Public Relations Committee, Star Party Committee, SBAS/Public School Liaison, Observation Chairman.

== Associated Organizations ==
The SBAS belongs to the Astronomical League and the Night Sky Network.

== See also ==
- List of astronomical societies
