= Bulletin of the Astronomical Society of India =

Scientific journal of the Astronomical Society of India

- Discipline: Astronomy
- Language: English
- Edited by: D. J. Saikia

Publication details
- History: 1973–2014
- Publisher: Astronomical Society of India (India)
- Frequency: Quarterly
- Impact factor: 0.704 (2015)

Standard abbreviations
- ISO 4: Bull. Astron. Soc. India

Indexing
- ISSN: 0304-9523 (print); 2249-9601 (web)

Links
- Journal homepage

The Bulletin of the Astronomical Society of India is the official quarterly peer-reviewed scientific journal of the Astronomical Society of India established in 1973 and published until the end of 2014. It covers all areas of astrophysics and astronomy. The editor-in-chief is D. J. Saikia (National Centre for Radio Astrophysics).

== Editors ==
The following persons have been editor-in-chief of the journal:

- D. J. Saikia (2010–2014)
- G. C. Anupama (2004–2010)
- H. C. Bhatt (2001–2004)
- Vinod Krishnan (1995–2001)
- K. D. Abhyankar (1992–1995)
- S. K. Trehan (1981–1992)
- M. S. Vardya (1974–1981)
