= (523794) 2015 RR245 =

Trans-Neptunian object

(523794) 2015 RR_{245}
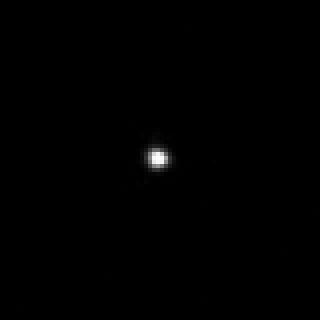
- 2015 RR_{245} imaged by the Hubble Space Telescope in October 2020

Discovery
- Discovered by: OSSOS; Michele T. Bannister et al.
- Discovery site: Mauna Kea Obs.
- Discovery date: 9 September 2015

Designations
- Alternative designations: "Leonardo" (nickname)
- Minor planet category: TNO · SDO · resonant (2:9) p-DP · distant

Orbital characteristics(barycentric) (Note: These orbital elements are expressed in terms of the Solar System Barycenter (SSB) as the frame of reference. Due to planetary perturbations, the Sun revolves around the SSB at non-negligible distances, so heliocentric-frame orbital elements and distances (such as those given in JPL's Small-Body Database) can vary on short timescales.)
- Epoch 27 April 2019 (JD 2458600.5)
- Uncertainty parameter 3
- Observation arc: 13.10 yr (4,786 d)
- Earliest precovery date: 15 October 2004
- Aphelion: 128.633 AU
- Perihelion: 33.840 AU
- Semi-major axis: 81.236 AU
- Eccentricity: 0.5834
- Orbital period (sidereal): 732.21 yr (267,444 d)
- Mean anomaly: 323.36°
- Mean motion: 0° 0^{m} 4.68^{s} / day
- Inclination: 7.5807°
- Longitude of ascending node: 211.66°
- Time of perihelion: ≈ 21 August 2092 ±3 days
- Argument of perihelion: 261.26°
- Known satellites: 0 (1?)

Physical characteristics
- Mean diameter: 648 km 608 km 630 km ∼670 km (Note: assuming an albedo of 0.12; 500–870 km for an albedo of 0.21 to 0.07)
- Geometric albedo: 0.12 (assumed); 0.11 (assumed); 0.126 (assumed); 0.09 (assumed)
- Spectral type: neutral g–r=0.59±0.11
- Apparent magnitude: 21.2 (perihelic)
- Absolute magnitude (H): 3.6±0.1 (H_{r}); 3.81

(523794) 2015 RR_{245} is a large trans-Neptunian object of the Kuiper belt in the outermost regions of the Solar System. It was discovered on 9 September 2015, by the Outer Solar System Origins Survey at Mauna Kea Observatories on the Big Island of Hawaii, in the United States. The object is in a rare 2:9 resonance with Neptune and probably measures somewhere between 500 and 900 kilometres in diameter.

== History ==
=== Discovery ===
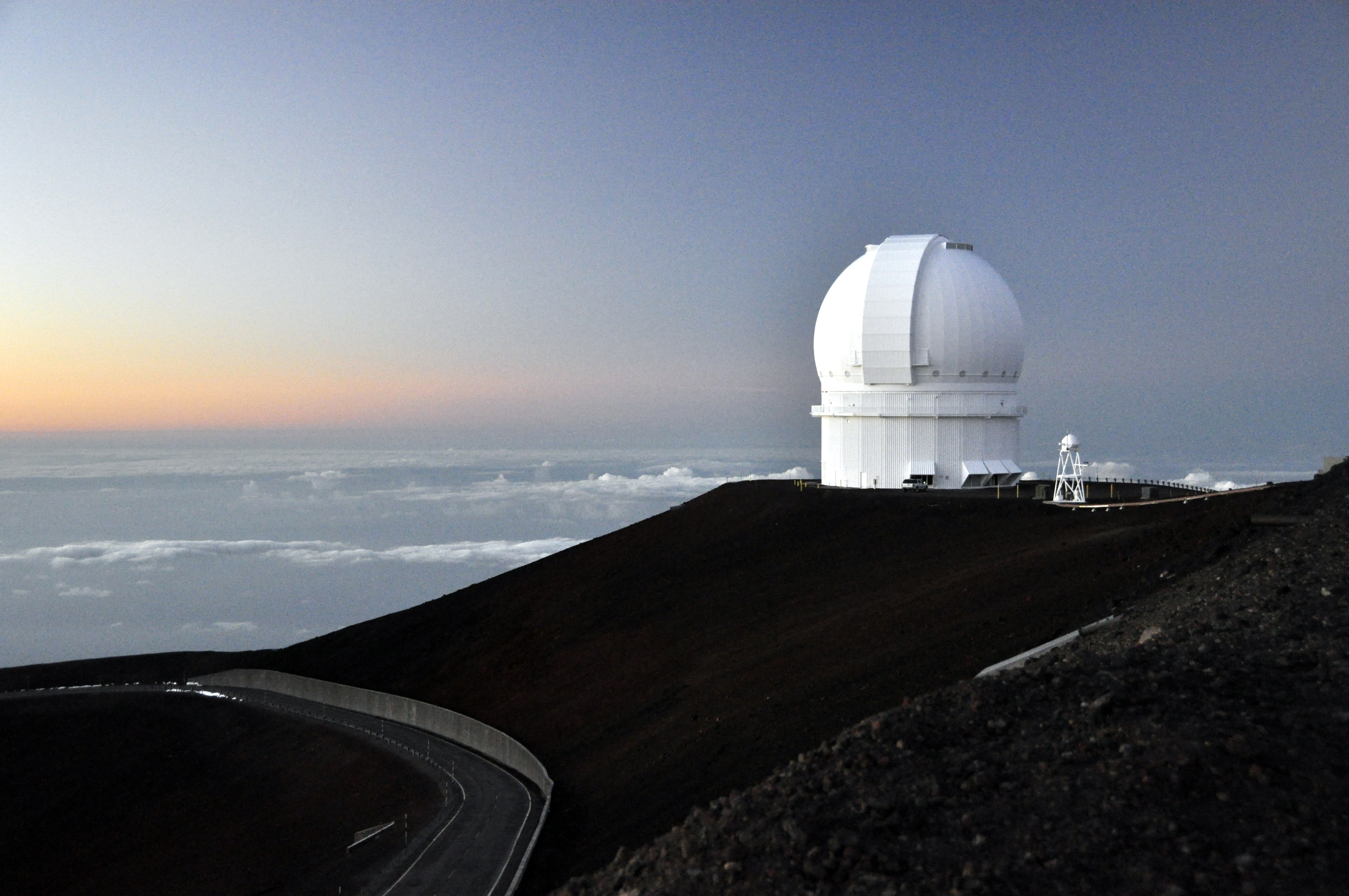
The Canada–France–Hawaii Telescope, the telescope that discovered 2015 RR_{245} on 9 September 2015

A first precovery of 2015 RR_{245} was taken at the Cerro Tololo Observatory in Chile on 15 October 2004. It was first observed by a research team led by Michele Bannister while poring over images that the Canada–France–Hawaii Telescope in Hawaii took in September 2015 as part of the Outer Solar System Origins Survey (OSSOS), and later identified in images taken at Sloan Digital Sky Survey and Pan-STARRS between 2008 and 2016. The discovery was formally announced in a Minor Planet Electronic Circular on 10 July 2016.

=== Provisional designation, numbering and nickname ===
This minor planet was numbered by the Minor Planet Center on 25 September 2018 (M.P.C. 111779). It has not been named and remains primarily known by its provisional designation 2015 RR_{245}. The provisional designation of 2015 RR_{245} indicates its discovery date, the first letter represents the first half of September and the second letter and the numbers after it mean that it is the 6168th object discovered during that half-month. (Note: The second letter 'R' indicates that it is the 18th object discovered on the 246th cycle of discoveries. Each completed cycle consists of 25 letters representing discoveries, hence 18 + (246 completed cycles × 25 letters) = 6168.) Wesley Fraser, who was part of the team that discovered 2015 RR_{245}, had nicknamed the object "Leonardo" in a 2020 blog post.

== Orbit and classification ==
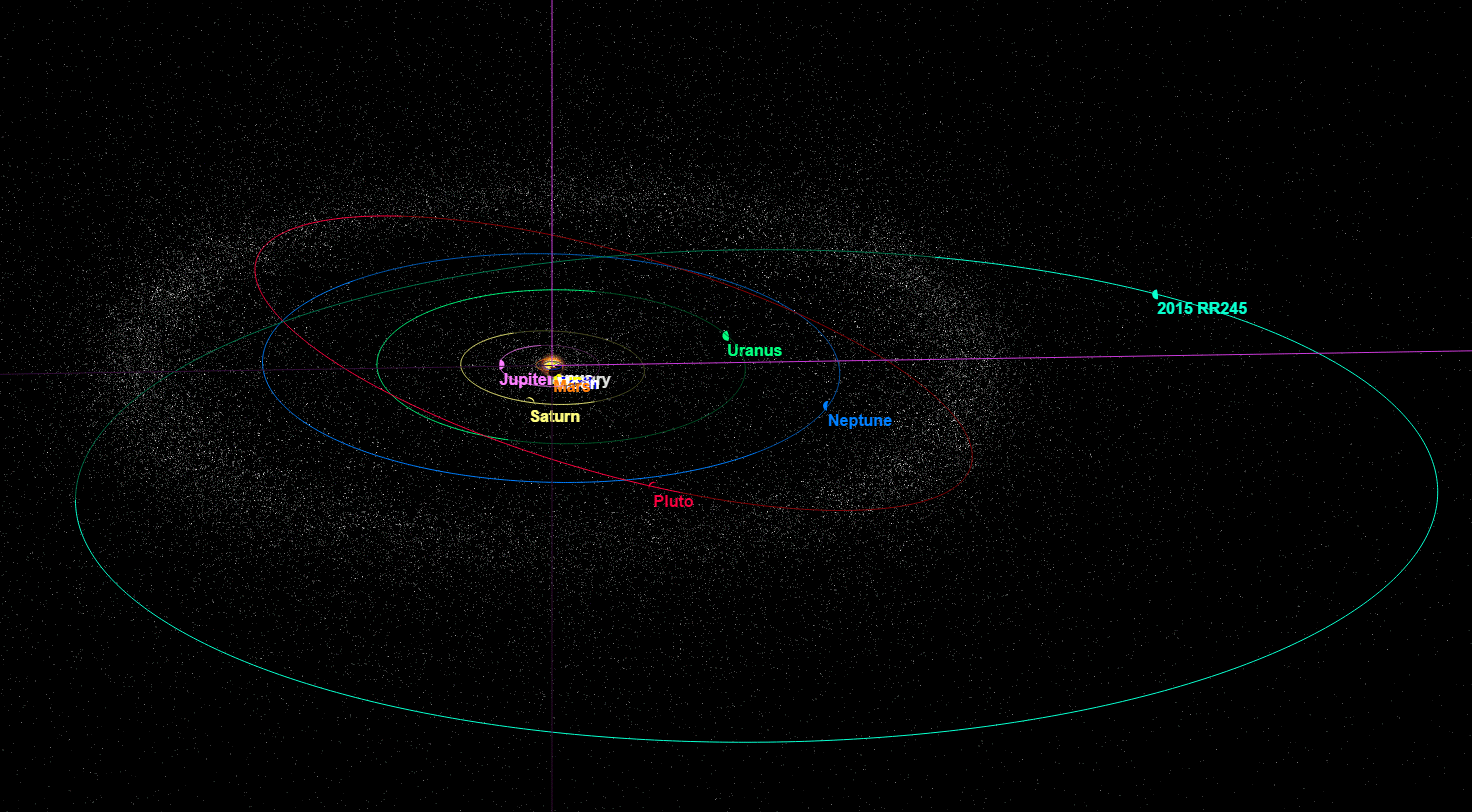
2015 RR_{245} orbit diagram with the Kuiper belt and outer planet orbits shown

2015 RR_{245}'s orbit librating in a 2:9 resonance with Neptune

As of 2026, 2015 RR_{245} has a reasonably well defined orbit with an uncertainty of 3. It orbits the Sun at a distance of 33.8–128.6 AU once every 732 years and 2.5 months (for reference, Neptune's orbit is at 30 AU). Its orbit has an eccentricity of 0.58 and an inclination of 7.6° with respect to the ecliptic.

2015 RR_{245} is among the most distant known Solar System objects. As of 2018, it is 63 AU from the Sun. It will make its closest approach to the Sun in 2093, when it will reach an apparent magnitude of 21.2.

=== 2:9 resonance ===
Additional precovery astrometry from the Sloan Digital Sky Survey and the Pan-STARRS1 survey shows that 2015 RR_{245} is a resonant trans-Neptunian object, securely trapped in a 2:9 mean motion resonance with Neptune, meaning that this minor planet orbits the Sun twice in the same amount of time it takes Neptune to complete 9 orbits. The object is unlikely to have been trapped in the 2:9 resonance for the age of Solar System. It is much more likely that it has been hopping between various resonances and got trapped in the 2:9 resonance in the last 100 million years.

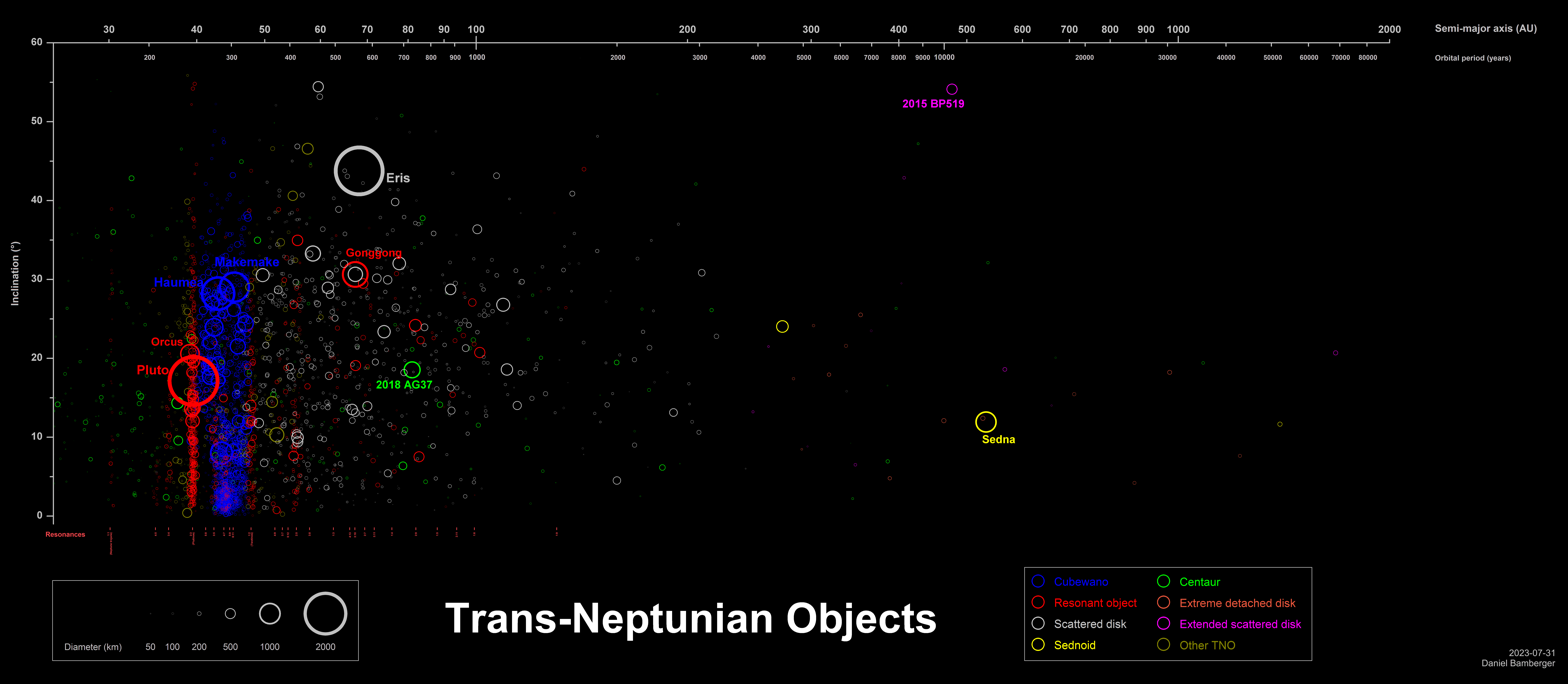
Distribution of trans-Neptunian objects. Objects occupying the stronger resonances are in red.

== Physical characteristics ==
=== Diameter and albedo ===
Its exact size is uncertain, but the estimates show around ∼670 km (420 mi) in diameter, assuming an albedo of 0.12 (within a wider range of 500 to 870 km, based on albedos of 0.21 to 0.07). For comparison, Pluto, the largest object in the Kuiper belt, is about 2,376.6 km (1,476.8 mi) in diameter. Johnston's Archive gives a diameter of 648 km (403 mi), using an albedo of 0.126. Another older page last updated in 2023 on his website shows an effective diameter of 694 km (431 mi), and a diameter for the primary of 608 km (378 mi), using albedo of 0.09, and H of 4.01.

=== Surface and spectrum ===
2015 RR_{245} has color indices of g-r of 0.59±0.11, making it have a relatively neutral color to the solar g-r of 0.44±0.02. This color is more commonly found among dynamically hot classical Kuiper belt objects, than found in cold classical Kuiper belt objects.

== Unconfirmed moon ==
In 2019, astronomers reported that observations by the Gemini North and Canada–France–Hawaii Telescope from 2013–2017 suggested the existence of a natural satellite or moon orbiting 2015 RR_{245}. According to Wesley Fraser, 2015 RR_{245} appeared to be a barely-resolved binary in highest-resolution images from these telescopes. The Gemini North and Hubble Space Telescope took further observations during 2019–2020 in attempt at confirming 2015 RR_{245}'s potential moon, but results have not yet been published as of 2026. Johnson’s Archive estimates a diameter of 334 km (208 mi) for the moon.
