= 1255 Schilowa =

Main-belt asteroid

Discovery
- Discovered by: G. Neujmin
- Discovery site: Simeiz Obs.
- Discovery date: 8 July 1932

Designations
- Named after: Maria Zhilova (Russian astronomer)
- Alternative designations: 1932 NC · 1933 VB; A905 UC
- Minor planet category: main-belt · (outer) background

Orbital characteristics
- Epoch 27 April 2019 (JD 2458600.5)
- Uncertainty parameter 0
- Observation arc: 113.54 yr (41,472 d)
- Aphelion: 3.6891 AU
- Perihelion: 2.5983 AU
- Semi-major axis: 3.1437 AU
- Eccentricity: 0.1735
- Orbital period (sidereal): 5.57 yr (2,036 d)
- Mean anomaly: 122.84°
- Mean motion: 0° 10^{m} 36.48^{s} / day
- Inclination: 8.5473°
- Longitude of ascending node: 237.62°
- Argument of perihelion: 133.51°

Physical characteristics
- Mean diameter: 32.52±1.6 km 33.669±0.718 km 35.846±2.824 km 36.49±0.51 km 37.24±4.78 km
- Synodic rotation period: 29.536±0.006 h
- Geometric albedo: 0.071±0.031; 0.111±0.004; 0.1144±0.0263; 0.130±0.027; 0.1389±0.015
- Spectral type: S (assumed)
- Absolute magnitude (H): 10.20; 10.3; 10.63

1255 Schilowa, provisional designation 1932 NC, is a background asteroid from the outer regions of the asteroid belt, approximately 34 kilometers (21 miles) in diameter. It was discovered on 8 July 1932, by Soviet astronomer Grigory Neujmin at the Simeiz Observatory on the Crimean peninsula. The asteroid has a longer-than average rotation period of 29.5 hours. It was named after Mariya Zhilova (Schilowa), who was Russia's first professional female astronomer.

== Orbit and classification ==
Schilowa is a non-family asteroid from the main belt's background population. It orbits the Sun in the outer main-belt at a distance of 2.6–3.7 AU once every 5 years and 7 months (2,036 days; semi-major axis of 3.14 AU). Its orbit has an eccentricity of 0.17 and an inclination of 9° with respect to the ecliptic.

The asteroid was first observed as A905 UC at Heidelberg Observatory in October 1905. The body's observation arc began one week later at Heidelberg in November 1905, almost 27 years prior to its official discovery observation at Simeiz.

== Naming ==
This minor planet was named after Mariya Vasilyevna Zhilova (1870–1934), also known Mariya Shilova or Schilowa, a Russian astronomer at the Pulkovo Observatory near Saint Petersburg. She was Russia's first professional female astronomer and awarded for her work on celestial mechanics by the Russian Astronomical Society in 1905. The official naming citation was mentioned in The Names of the Minor Planets by Paul Herget in 1955 (H 115).

== Physical characteristics ==
Schilowa is an assumed S-type asteroid.

=== Rotation period ===
Between 2005 and 2009, three rotational lightcurves of Schilowa were obtained from photometric observations by European astronomers Pierre Antonini, Laurent Bernasconi, René Roy, Reiner Stoss, Jaime Nomen, Salvador Sánchez, Raoul Behrend. Lightcurve analysis gave a rotation period of 29.536 hours (also 24 h and 29.7 h) with a brightness amplitude between 0.09 and 0.15 magnitude (U=2 and 2/2-).

=== Spin axis ===
In 2013, an international study modeled a lightcurve from various data sources including the Uppsala Asteroid Photometric Catalogue and the Palomar Transient Factory survey. The lightcurve gave a sidereal period of 29.4674 hours and allowed for the determination of two spin axis of (156.0°, −4.0°) and (338.0°, 15.0°) in ecliptic coordinates (λ, β).

=== Diameter and albedo ===
According to the surveys carried out by the Infrared Astronomical Satellite IRAS, the Japanese Akari satellite and the NEOWISE mission of NASA's Wide-field Infrared Survey Explorer, Schilowa measures between 32.52 and 37.24 kilometers in diameter and its surface has an albedo between 0.071 and 0.1389. The Collaborative Asteroid Lightcurve Link derives an albedo of 0.1273 and a diameter of 32.44 kilometers based on an absolute magnitude of 10.3.
