= Khagol Vishwa =

- Formation: November 17, 1999; 26 years ago
- Type: Non-governmental organization
- Location: Pune, India
- President: A. L. Deshmukh
- Key people: Mayuresh G. Prabhune (founder, secretary)
- Website: www.kvindia.org

Khagol Vishwa (KV) is an organization for amateur astronomers working in Maharashtra, India. It was established on 17 November 1999. The main activity of KV is to conduct observations of astronomical events, like meteor showers, eclipses, occultation, variable stars and generate scientific data for amateur research. Along with scientific studies, KV is also active in science popularization. Some of the major activities conducted by KV are public star gazing programs, sky at your doorstep, certificate course in amateur astronomy, and science exhibition.

== History ==
In 1998, the Leonid meteor shower was expected with outburst. Some enthusiastic students from Pune and Pimpri Chinchwad area came together to observe that event scientifically. After observing that glorious event, all of them got inspired to do something different in Amateur Astronomy. They decided to form an official group under which they could come together; discuss on various topics in Astronomy, observe various events in the Sky and contribute to astronomy.

== Structure ==
There are four main sections

=== Observation section ===
==== Planetary ====
Planetary observations are helpful to study changes in the surfaces and study of satellites of planets like Jupiter, Saturn and its rings, Lunar surface and as well as transits and oppositions of planets. These observations are visual and photographic.

==== Variable stars ====
Visual observations of variable stars and plotting the light curves. These observations are reporting to the organizations- AAVSO. Khagol Vishwa has formed a special Variable Star Section (VSS) for detailed study in this field.

==== Occultations ====
All types of eclipses, occultation of stars by planets and asteroids, lunar occultation, transits, timing these events, photography and CCD observations for study of particular Astronomical body.

==== Deep sky ====
This section works for study of faint objects in the night sky. Observations of NGC and Messier objects, comet hunting, photography of deep sky through telescopes.

=== Science popularization section ===
This section works to popularize basic sciences and astronomy in society. Some of the activities under this section are

==== Khagol Prasar Abhiyaan ====
Translated as Astronomy Popularization Movement, under this, khagol vishwa conducts lectures on astronomy in schools, colleges as well as open public lectures. There are also Star Gazing Programs once or twice a month.

==== Pimpri-Chinchwad science congress ====
A district level science congress is organised every alternate year. The aim of this event is to spread the awareness about fundamental sciences in high school students and to discuss local problems and issues and to encourage students to develop the science and technology to solve them.

=== Research and development section ===
The aim of formation of this section is to create atmosphere of research and development in India on an amateur level. It will be helpful to encourage more students to do something, to find something for our society and nation even if he/she does not have a science background and is working in different types of fields.

Some main projects under progress are ham radio networking for tele-education and communication under emergency, mini weather stations in all main villages for knowing local environment, helpful for students and farmers, creating electricity from bio gas, amateur mobile observatory for deep sky study and study of near Earth objects (NEO), analyzing observations, publishing papers, and making research projects.

=== Instrumentation section ===
Some research can be done better with proper instruments. Khagol Vishwa tries to buy instruments necessary for its activities and to make them available to students and members. Some of these instruments are made by members themselves under the Research and Development section.

== Lonar conservation project ==
Khagol Vishwa is one of the few organisations in India which is working to create awareness about Lonar crater lake and campaigning against its environmental degradation. The organization has been studying the site for past eight years and published the first report two years ago. Aspects of Lonar crater which have been studied are: geology and structure, ecology – flora, fauna, agriculture, zoology, sociology, water level and pollution.

== See also ==
- List of astronomical societies
