= Aurora Max =

The AuroraMax Project is an outreach and education initiative carried out by the combined effort of the Canadian Space Agency, Astronomy North, University of Calgary and the City of Yellowknife in Yellowknife Northwest Territories. The AuroraMax Project provides a place to explore and discover the science behind phenomena such as sunspots, Earth's magnetic field, space weather, and the northern lights of Canada. Auroras are natural exhibition of lights in the sky that can be seen by the naked eyes. Auroras occur when protons and electrons or charged particles and gases in the Earth's atmosphere crash into each other, creating tiny colorful flares of light that become visible in the sky. Billions of these tiny flares occur in sequence, causing the lights to appear as if they are moving. The lights in the Northern hemisphere are called aurora borealis, or the northern lights. The lights in the Southern hemisphere are called aurora australis, or the southern lights.

== Objectives ==
The purpose of the project is to monitor the frequency and intensity of the Aurora Borealis (Northern lights) in the years that led up to the Solar Maximum that was scheduled to occur in 2013-14. Scientists have noticed that the sun's activity follows a regular cycle and the peak (Solar maximum) is reached every 11 years. The main purpose of this project is to observe the activities and their developments leading up to the occurrence of the solar maximum, so that the pattern can be established and understood. The AuroraMax, also, has a website where everyone and anyone can view, admire the lights and the other wonders explored in the project in real time, as well as follow up on solar activities.

== The northern lights ==
Auroras are a product of the sun's activity; therefore the beautiful colorful lights seen at night are often caused by activities by the sun 150 million kilometers away. The sun sends out a constant flow of charged particles known as solar wind. When these winds or eruptions are pointed or directed at the Earth, they can spark up sun-induced auroras. The greater the activity of the sun, the brighter the auroras we see. The colors of the aurora are determined by three elements which are: the density of the atmosphere, the composition of gases in the Earth's atmosphere, the altitude where aurora occurs and the level of energy involved. The most common color seen is green, which is caused when the charged particles collide with oxygen at lower altitudes between 100-300 kilometers. Occasionally, the ends or tips of the aurora have a pink or crimson fringe, this is caused by the presence of nitrogen molecules. In the upper atmosphere between 300-400 kilometers, red instead of green is caused by the collision with atomic oxygen. It takes longer for the lights to be produced at higher altitudes because the atmosphere is less dense so it takes more energy and more time for the red lights to be produced. Blue and purple lights are also produced by the collision with hydrogen and helium but they are difficult for the eyes to see against the night sky.
