= ADLS =

ADLS may refer to:

- Activities of daily living, a term used in healthcare about daily self-care activities
- Aircraft Detection Lighting System, a system for turning wind turbine lights on, only when its radar detects aircraft within thresholds of altitude and distance
- Association of Dunkirk Little Ships, an association of owners of the Little Ships of Dunkirk
- Auckland District Law Society, a professional body in New Zealand
- Azure Data Lake Storage, a file system in Microsoft Azure

== See also ==
- ADL (disambiguation)
