= Veronica Burns =

Irish curator (1914–1998)

Veronica Conroy Burns
- Born: 13 November 1914; Calverstown, County Kildare
- Died: 5 January 1998 (aged 83); Dublin
- Known for: graptolites
- Scientific career
- Fields: Geology
- Workplaces: Irish Astronomical Society, Armagh Observatory, Trinity College, Dublin

Veronica Conroy Burns (13 November 1914 – 5 January 1998) was an Irish museum curator, best known as an expert on graptolites.

== Early life ==
Veronica Conroy was born at Calverstown, County Kildare. Her mother was in poor health so she was fostered to a family named Burns in Dublin at a very young age. After she discovered her natural brother when she was 22 she took their name Conroy as her second name. She lived in the same house in Ballsbridge in Dublin for all but 2 years of her life. She was considered largely self-educated as she did not hold a degree, but developed interest in astronomy, natural history and geology/palaeontology. She went on to successfully create links between academia and the activities of amateur geologists.

== Career ==
Burns was one of the founders of the Irish Astronomical Society in 1938, and served as an officer of the organization several times. She was also a member of the Irish Geological Association. In the 1940s she compiled meteorological records at Armagh Observatory, and worked as a laboratory assistant, and in a photo studio. In 1953 she joined the Dublin Naturalists' Field Club, and organized the club's annual exhibition for many years. She led 19 field trips over a 27-year period. She was an enthusiastic collector of fossils, especially of graptolites from the Irish coast. Colleagues encouraged her to write about her collection, and she co-authored two academic papers about graptolites.

In 1960 Burns became a research assistant to Robert George Spencer Hudson (1895–1965). She started as a photographic technician in the geology department at Trinity College, Dublin in 1964, but soon took charge of the department's museum collections. She created displays, reorganized the mineral samples, catalogued over 20,000 specimens, and gave tours to schoolchildren. She curated and catalogued over 20,000 mineral specimens. Even after her retirement in 1980, she maintained a presence at the museum.

Her speciality was collecting fossils. In early 1960s she would go on field trips to Balbriggan and Skerries in north Dublin to collect Silurian graptolites, which are fossils of colonial marine animals. She created a large collection of Lower Carboniferous fossils which were used in a paper published on the Scientific Proceedings of the Royal Dublin Society in 1966 by R. G. S. Hudson, Michael Clarke, and George Sevastopulo, though she was not included as an author.

Burns was very modest about her work but she was encouraged to publish her findings. Two papers, one with Barrie Rickards and Jean Archer in 1973 and one with Rickards in 1993, used her findings to accurately date the rocks in the Balbriggan area. Her collections are now in the Geological Museum in Trinity.

== Later life ==
Burns suffered late in life with osteoporosis but remained active in the museum. She died in Dublin on 5 January 1998.
