= SpaceTurk =

Turkish space research group

SpaceTurk, founded in 1998 as the Turkish Space Research Group, is a non-profit and volunteer group dedicated to working on space research. The group's activities so far are:

- Execution of the Middle East and Turkey representative of the United Nations Space Generation Advisory Council (SGAC).
- Establishment of Space Association of Turkic States (SATS).
- Yuri's Night organizations in several cities including Ankara and Istanbul.
- World Space Week organizations in several cities with a high participation rate in primary schools.
- Detection of environmental pollution due to the oil spills from the tankers with satellite views.
- Detection of the deforestation in Burundi with remote sensing.
- System design for a civilian, peace, and science-aimed launcher (ATA1 project).

== See also ==
- List of astronomical societies
