= Orange County Astronomers =

American non-profit astronomy organization

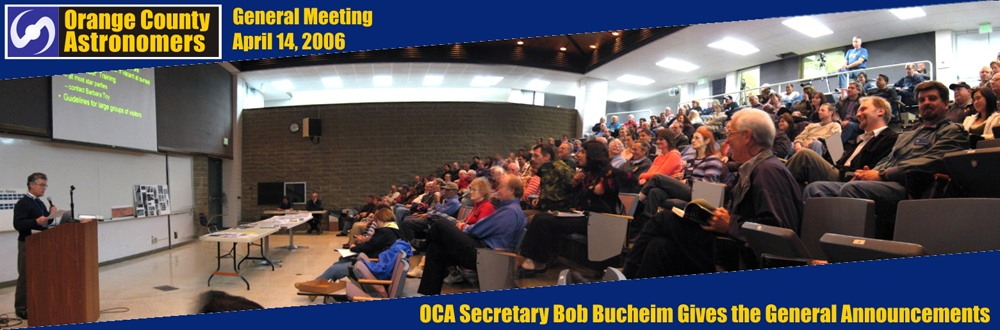
Panoramic view of an OCA general meeting

The Orange County Astronomers (OCA) is a 501(c)(3) non-profit, civilian-led astronomy organization in Orange County, southern California. It was formed in 1967 and currently operates with around 800 concurrent members; they offer beginner courses in astronomy, and have meetings on the second Friday of every month at Chapman University. Currently, the OCA offers a dark-sky site to viewers, which includes a 22-inch Schmidt-Cassegrain telescope and public-use observation areas. In addition, the OCA has been registered as an affiliate of the Astronomers Without Borders program since March of 2012.

== OCA Observatory ==
In September of 1984, a 22-inch Schmidt-Cassegrain telescope along with an observatory were opened in the namesake of William Kuhn. This telescope is operated at the OCA Observatory, located at a dark-sky site that is a two hour drive from Orange County. Today there are several different areas on the site for observing pads, as well as several small observatory sites for individual members. The club holds a star party there every month, during which a certified telescope operator guides the 22-inch Cassegrain telescope around the night sky. "Star members" are the only personnel who are allowed to operate the telescope, at the cost of $150 to become a certified member. The site includes a mobile home outfitted with a kitchen and bathroom, and is used as a location to warm up in the winter, or cool off in the summer.

== Activities ==
OCA has a myriad of activities for those interested in delving deeper into astronomy. In addition to beginner's classes, public outreaches and monthly general meetings, there are special interest groups that meet on a regular basis, including AstroImagers and AstroPhysics.

== Library ==
Members can check out a wealth of books and videos available at the club's library. The library is located at the Irvine Lecture Hall of the Chapman University and is operational during the general meetings.

== Asteroid ==
Asteroid 6525 Ocastron, discovered by Jack B. Child and Greg Fisch in 1992, was named in recognition and appreciation of the Orange County Astronomers. The official naming citation was published by the Minor Planet Center on 1 June 1996 (M.P.C. 27331).

== See also ==
- List of astronomical societies
