= Mohawk Valley Astronomical Society =

On May 31, 1989, seven amateur astronomers held an organizational meeting in the Solar Classroom at Hamilton College in Clinton, New York, to plan the formation of an astronomy club. By-laws were prepared by Richard Somer, approved by the group, and the Mohawk Valley Astronomical Society was born. The founders were Richard Somer, Arlene Somer, Joe Perry, Sam Falvo, Dan Pavese, John Ossowski, and Phil Marasco.

Over the next several weeks, Dick Somer designed and printed brochures for prospective new members. The group discussed ideas for publicity campaigns to promote the Club, and considered schedules for Club and public observing sessions. Dan Pavese suggested "Telescopic Topics" as the name of the newsletter, and it was adopted.

The first public meeting was held in Hamilton College's Solar Classroom on July 12, and the club was off to a good start. The previous day, an article appeared in the Utica "Observer-Dispatch" inviting the public to attend, and the local community responded heartily. Over 60 people came to the first meeting. The evening's speakers presented slides and photographs of the sky's most noted features, from the Moon to distant galaxies, the Milky Way, Comet Halley as seen from the Mohawk Valley, and a brilliant aurora. Once the meeting adjourned, members and visitors used the telescope in Hamilton College's Observatory to view the Moon and Saturn.

August 1989 marked the first publication of the MVAS newsletter, "Telescopic Topics." The newsletter is published monthly and provides a summary of the minutes of the previous month's meeting, reminders of upcoming observing sessions, and astronomy conferences as well as the latest news from the scientific community such as updates on NASA missions and the discovery of new celestial objects.

== Membership ==
Membership in MVAS is open to anyone with an interest in astronomy, from beginners to the more experienced.

== Meetings ==
Meetings are held the second Wednesday of each month (except March and July) at 7:30 PM at the Kirkland Senior Center, 2 Mill St., Clark Mills, NY (directions and map) unless otherwise noted. The April meeting is held on a Saturday evening in conjunction with a social event at a local restaurant. The July Star-B-Que is held on a weekend. All meetings are open to the public. Guests are encouraged to attend. Refreshments are provided by MVAS members.

== Public outreach ==
Stargazing events and talks are held throughout the area.

== Publications ==
The club publishes a monthly newsletter called "Telescopic Topics."

== See also ==
- List of astronomical societies
