= Ralph A. Worley Observatory =

Observatory in Louisiana, US

- Organization: Louisiana State University in Shreveport
- Location: Shreveport, Louisiana, USA
- Coordinates: 32°19′11.11″N 93°37′17.43″W
- Altitude: 328 m (1,076 ft)

Telescopes
- 16 inch Newtonian reflector

Ralph A. Worley Observatory is an astronomical observatory currently under lease to Shreveport-Bossier Astronomical Society. It was built in 1964 by the Shreveport-Bossier Astronomical Society and later donated to the Caddo Parish School System. It is located 8 miles south of Shreveport, Louisiana, USA.

== History ==
In 1959 when the Worley family of Shreveport attended an astronomy convention in Colorado. Enthusiastic about astronomy, an organizational meeting for a club was held on October 10, 1959. The first public meeting of the club was held on November 14, 1959 at Centenary College. Sara Worley was the first President. At that time, the name of the club was the Shreveport Junior Astronomical Society. Only those members under the age of 16 could vote or hold office. Dues for regular members were $5.00 a year including a subscription to Sky and Telescope magazine. Two of the main goals of the members were to build an observatory and secure a planetarium for the Shreveport area. Star parties were held for the public to view through telescopes in order to raise money for the observatory. A fee of thirty cents per person was charged. The club estimated that approximately $10,000 was needed to build an observatory and an additional $10,000 for the telescope, eyepieces, and other equipment.

The members looked for a site to build the observatory. Land was offered by a farmer—Mr. L. S. "Scrib" Frierson, but it was found that the access road through the cotton field to the selected site had a small culvert which would not support a concrete truck. Mr. Frierson directed the club members to another part of the cotton plantation where they came across an abandoned corn crib that had been burned and abandoned. The architect, Joseph Schirer, said he could redraw the original plans to convert the corn crib into an observatory building. Construction was started in September 1963 for the observatory that is still present.

United Gas Pipeline Corporation designed and built the mount and drive for a 16 1/2" telescope. It was estimated that it would weigh between 2,000 and 3,000 pounds and was nicknamed "The Monster." The members took turns working on the grinding of the telescope mirror. After much work by the members and companies involved, the Shreveport Observatory was dedicated and officially opened on April 18, 1964. The estimated value was $55,000 and was 15 miles from the city of Shreveport. Today, the observatory is less than 8 miles from the city and being encroached upon by the lights of not only the city and highway, but also lights from oil and gas wells. The Society having met its major goal of bringing an observatory to the Shreveport area went on to help promote the City of Shreveport in building a planetarium which was later funded and built by the City of Shreveport.

In 1967 Lockheed donated a solar filter to the Society. At that time, it was said to be only one in five in use in the United States. The members of the Society worked hard to build a building to house a telescope to be used with this filter. The building was dedicated in 1969.

The observatory ownership was transferred to the Caddo Parish School Board in November 1969. Today, the Society has an agreement for use of the observatory.

The club reorganized itself in April 1971 by becoming an adult club. Younger members could be members, but only those 16 years or older could be an officer. On March 27, 1975 the Society became the one that it is today. Incorporation papers were signed on that day and a board of directors was created. Later, the Society added "Bossier" to its name to become the Shreveport-Bossier Astronomical Society, Inc.

== See also ==
- List of observatories
