= Astronomy North =

Canadian non-profit astronomical society

Astronomy North is a Canadian non-profit astronomical society for auroras. It was founded as a small club of volunteers in Yellowknife, Northwest Territories, in 2004. The society collaborated with the Canadian Space Agency to start the AuroraMAX virtual observatory in 2009.

== Website ==
The Astronomy North website contains a regularly-updated aurora forecast for Yellowknife. The society has maintained an observation record of the night sky above Yellowknife since 2010.

== See also ==
- List of astronomical societies
