= Norwegian Astronomical Society =

Norwegian Astronomical Society, existed since 1938

The Norwegian Astronomical Society (Norwegian: Norsk Astronomisk Selskap) is a Norwegian organization active in astronomy research, education and outreach.

The society was founded on 25 February 1938 in Oslo and initiated by Svein Rosseland, who also founded the Institute of Theoretical Astrophysics at the University of Oslo. Hans Severin Jelstrup was elected as the first chairman, with Gunnar Randers being deputy chairman and Helmut Ormestad secretary. In 1943, the society launched its periodical, Norsk populær-astronomisk tidsskrift. The first issue had contributions from Svein Rosseland, Hans Severin Jelstrup and Eberhart Jensen among others.

Its members are both professional and amateur astronomers. The organization has almost two thousand members. During the 2004 transit of Venus, NAS organized the Norwegian public show. It organizes national conferences and the Norwegian Astronomy Olympiad.

The society has several observation groups for meteors, comets, variable stars, supernovae, occultations, the sun, and aurorae. A shift towards a more professional orientation was formalized in 1968 when the journal Astronomisk Tidskrift (Astronomical Journal) was started as a joint venture of the Danish, Norwegian and Swedish societies. Since 1990, the journal Astronomi has been the official magazine for members.

== See also ==
- List of astronomical societies
