= Hong Kong Astronomical Society =

Scientific outreach organization

- 香港天文學會
- Abbreviation: HKAS
- Predecessor: Hong Kong Amateur Astronomical Union (AAU)
- Formation: 1974
- Type: Nonprofit organization
- Purpose: Popularize astronomical knowledge, enhance astronomical research and promote cooperation among members
- Headquarters: Kwun Tong, Kowloon
- Location: Hong Kong SAR, China
- Official language: Chinese
- President: Yu Kam Fung
- Website: https://www.hkas.org.hk
- Formerly called: Hong Kong Amateur Astronomical Society (AAS)

The Hong Kong Astronomical Society (HKAS) is the first public Hong Kong astronomical body, for amateur astronomers and other interested individuals. The primary objectives of the HKAS are to promote popular science of astronomy and other related sciences; raise public awareness of astronomy and other related topics such as light pollution; offer astronomical seminars, and provide astronomical training courses to schools and companies.

Current mission of the society is to enhance and share humanity's scientific understanding of the universe as a diverse and inclusive astronomical community.

== Predecessor and change of name ==
In 1970, a group of secondary school students established Hong Kong Amateur Astronomical Union (AAU)... which was then renamed and registered as Hong Kong Amateur Astronomical Society (AAS) in 1974, the predecessor of HKAS, under the Cap. 151 Societies Ordinance of Hong Kong.

In 1992, Hong Kong Amateur Astronomical Society was renamed as the current name, to facilitate its property of overseas exchange.

== Publications ==
=== Historical ===
Until 1974, AAU published a single-sheet stencil-printed leaflet titled "Astronomy Information" which distributed to members and astronomy clubs in secondary schools. The Society also strove to raise fellow members' standard in astronomy systematically by compiling lecture notes as well as organizing public lectures on basic astronomy.

In 1974, the AAS and Sky Observers' Association (HK) jointly published the "Hong Kong Astronomical Journal" which was available for public subscription, which conveys astronomical news and information for fellow amateurs and members of public, and the society solely published the journal two years later. 34 issues were distributed and the circulation of the journal peaked at over 1,000 in total. In 1981, the Society terminated the journal's publication.

In 1977, HKAS was invited to write a monthly column on astronomy in Wah Kiu Yat Po, a local Chinese newspaper, until the newspaper was sold to South China Morning Post in 1991.

In 1978, the society published "Lunar Eclipse Handbook" which can be purchased publicly.

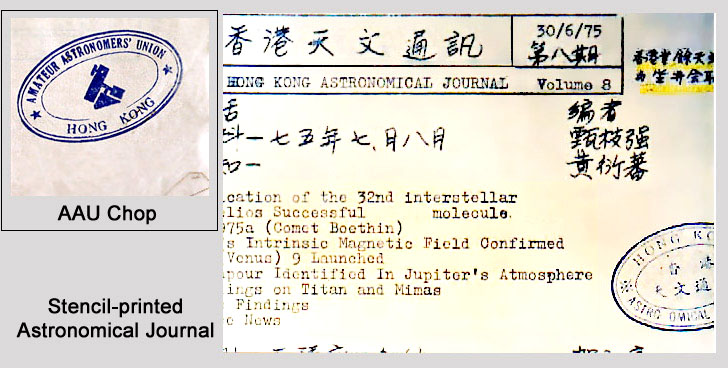
Hong Kong Astronomical Journal

In 1998, the Hong Kong Commercial Daily invited HKAS to write for the paper's monthly astronomy column, to spread astronomical knowledge, news and information to general public.

== Activities ==
=== Photographic competition and exhibition ===
In 1975, AAS organized the first local astrophotographic competition with the winning and participating entries exhibited at the "Astrophotographic Exhibition" at the High Block of Hong Kong City Hall to raise public interest in astronomy. More than 10,000 people attended this exhibition, which was the first large-scale exhibition on astronomy in the territory.

=== Hong Kong Astronomical Convention ===
In January 1977, AAS organized the First Hong Kong Astronomical Convention at Cheung Chau, an outlying island with a large playground, for displaying numerous large and small telescopes including a small radio telescope called a corner reflector.

The Second Hong Kong Astronomical Convention was held by AAS in 1982 jointly with the Hong Kong Space Museum at the Sai Kung Bradbury Astronomy Camp.

== Radio programmes ==
In 1983, the AAS and RTHK launched a weekly radio programme about astronomy called "Cosmic Journey". The half-hour programme had 34 episodes and covered various astronomy topics.

In 1985, the AAS and RTHK cooperated again to present new broadcast programme "Cosmic Journey II".

In 1999, the HKAS and RTHK launched a new radio programme called "Unlimited Universe"

== Participations ==
=== Local ===
==== Astronomical Training Programme for Secondary School Students ====
Astronomical Training Programme for Secondary Students, or ATPSS, is co-organised by the Hong Kong Space Museum, the Department of Physics of the Chinese University of Hong Kong and HKAS. It provides a comprehensive training in astronomy to local full-time Secondary 4 and Secondary 5 students. It aims to cultivate and promote students' interests in natural science

=== Mainland China ===
==== With Yunnan Astronomical Observatory ====
HKAS has involved in a wide field survey research project held by Yunnan Astronomical Observatory in 2015. A 0.45m Wide Field telescope in a 4m dome in Gaomeigu, Lijiang under the collaboration between both parties, and the society assisted in fine-tuning, field testing of the observation system; and performing observational researches such as "A New Magnetically Active Binary System Discovered in Yunnan-Hong Kong Wide Field Survey"

=== International ===
In 1994, International Occultation and Timing Association (IOTA) authorized the Occultation Timing Section of the HKAS to compute and dispatch predictions of occultation events to Greater China (including Mainland China, Hong Kong, Macau, Taiwan), India, Mongolia and Southeast Asia countries such as Singapore, Philippines, Vietnam, Malaysia.

==== With International Astronomical Union ====
Among other Hong Kong astronomical institutions, HKAS is a supporter of IAU's activities. The society supported IAU100 Name ExoWorlds event held by IAU Office of National Outreach to select name of star and planet in HD 212771.

== Internet presence ==
=== e-Groups, website and Facebook ===
In 2007, the society created the public online forum for, and the society's Lunar Occultation Section resumed dissemination of planetary occultation information at its own Occultation Forum.

In 2009, the society established its own Facebook page and group, whereas the Lunar Occultation Section had its own Facebook page in July 2017.

=== Hong Kong Astronomy (HKAStro) mobile apps ===
The Hong Kong Astronomy mobile application for iOS devices was launched at Apple App Store on 19 May 2012.

The Apps provided daily astronomy and space-related news, observational information, astronomical activities, regional night sky conditions, 16-day weather forecast, cloud coverage forecast, moon phase, sunrise, sunset, moonrise, moonset, and other relevant information.

The Android version was launched on 13 July 2014 whereas the Windows Phone version was launched on 31 August 2014. Apart from local users, the Apps encompasses users in mainland China, Macau, Taiwan and overseas Chinese.

In 2017, the Hong Kong Astronomy Apps was awarded as a Meritorious Healthy Apps For Mobile Phone and Tablet Users chosen by the Office for Film, Newspaper and Article Administration of HKSAR Government

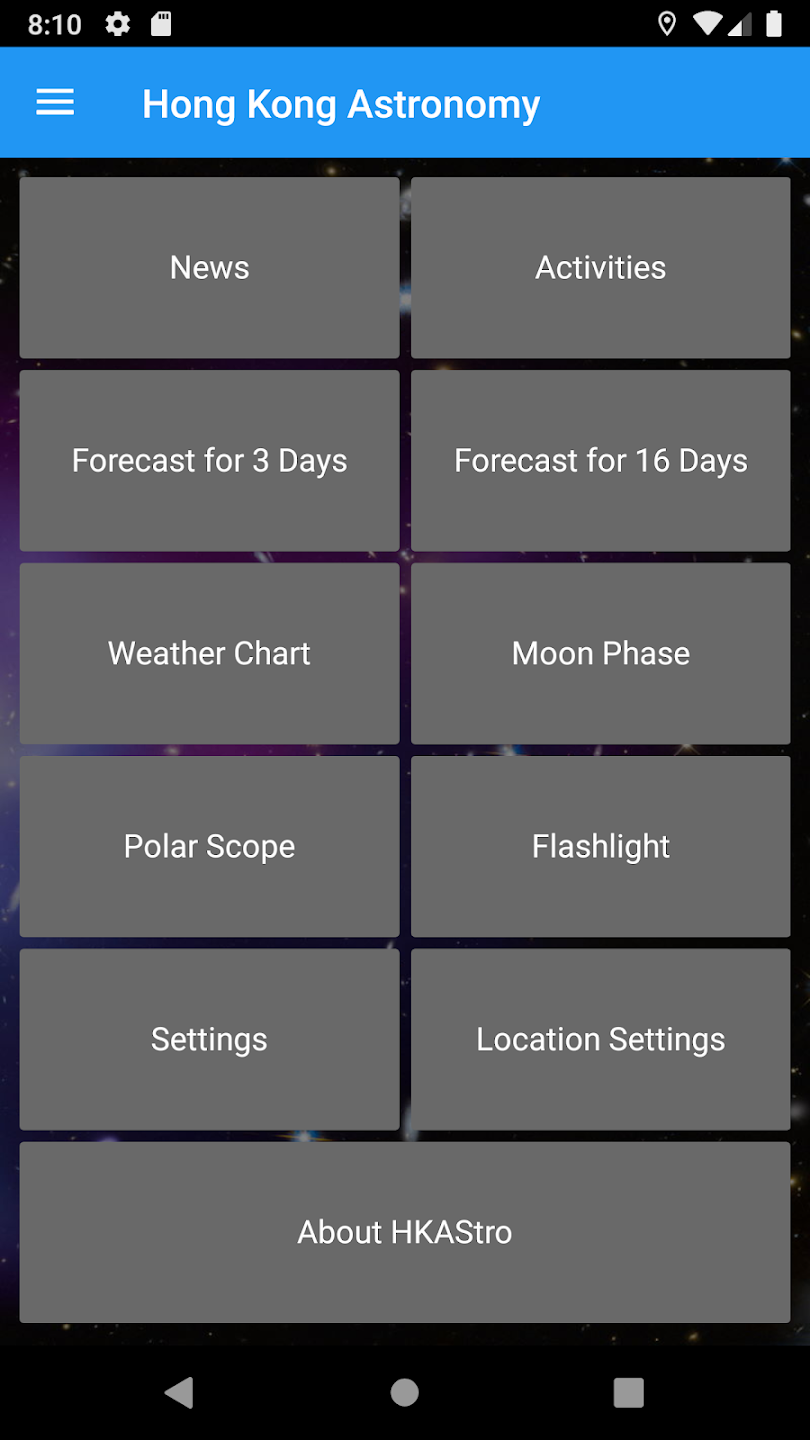
