= Hans Severin Jelstrup =

Norwegian astronomer

Hans Severin Jelstrup (2 August 1893 in Christiania – 1964) was a Norwegian astronomer.

His specialties were geophysics and geodesy. He spent his entire academic career, from 1922 to 1963, in the Norwegian Mapping and Cadastre Authority (then known as Norges Geografiske Oppmåling). He also edited the official Norwegian almanac from 1943 until his death.

He was taking part in forming the Norwegian Astronomical Society, and on February 25, 1938, he was elected as the first chairman.
