= Aleppo Defenders Legion =

Pro-Assad militant group

- فيلق المدافعين عن حلب
- Leader: Saber Rameen
- Founded: 27 February 2017
- Dates active: 27 February 2017-December 2, 2024
- Country: Syria
- Ideology: Assadism; Pro-Iranism
- Status: active
- Wars: Syrian civil war; SDF insurgency in northern Syria

Aleppo Defenders Legion (Arabic: فيلق المدافعين عن حلب, romanized: Fylq al-mudāfiʻīn ʻan Ḥalab) is a pro-Assad militant group based in Aleppo and targets mainly opposition forces that are against Bashar al-Assad with their control and mandate around Aleppo controlling local law enforcement and any legal activities in the area, ADL is known to commit arson, murder, and physical assault and other forms of harm to those who oppose Bashar al-Assad. The group is effectively the Syrian regime's main control of Aleppo.

== History ==
The group was established on 27 February 2017, after the Aleppo Defenders Legion brought together many of the local militias with support from Iran's Islamic Revolutionary Guard Corps with its formation occurring near the time where regime sponsored militias took control of Aleppo's eastern city and neighborhoods. This group serves as an umbrella organization which emerged during the first quarter of 2017 as the regime expanded against the Islamic State in east Aleppo. The groups backing and purpose is to also deepen Iran's ties with Aleppo and it's region. As a governing body and militant group, the Aleppo Defenders Legion has participated and held meetings with the Aleppo sector of the Syrian Ba'ath party, Liwa al-Baqir, and Liwa al-Quds. The armed battalions of the Aleppo Defenders Legion include Fawj al-Safira, Fawj Hadher, and Fawj Azan with the ruling commander of all of them, including the group itself, Aleppo Defenders Legion, being Saber Rameen after succeeding Javad Ghaffari in 2021.

In the areas of Aleppo and Syrian Democratic Forces territory, the Aleppo Defenders Legion is one of the primary traffickers of narcotics through those areas, specifically, Manbij, Tell Rifaat, and the Aleppo countryside adjacent to Afrin.

The Aleppo Defenders Legion has the city of Aleppo primarily divided into four sectors known as squares, the second square is considered to be the most influential which is located in the central district of al-Telfon al-Hawaei. These squares are basically the governing bodies of the cities sectors which further exercises the control of local leaders and neighborhood councils that consist of individuals close to the ADL. The legion is also represented in Aleppo's provincial and city councils. Each square has sub-offices that directly oversee the provision of services related to education, culture, religious affairs, and other matters. Within all these squares of influence and control, the group maintains control of the law enforcement and local governance.

In 2021, the Aleppo Defenders Legion established a Shia faction, specifically people from the Twelver-Ja'fari sect, of the group after recruiting people from villages in the Aleppo Governorate and Idlib Governorate including the villages of Nubl, Al-Zahra, Kafriya, and Al-Foua in addition they recruited Sunni Muslims from the area to teach them Shi'ite doctrine. Children's areas were also set up where some children were recruited for military work.
