= Maria Zhilova =

Russian astronomer

- Born: 9 January 1871; Rybinsk
- Died: 16 May 1934 (aged 63); Saint Petersburg
- Occupation: Astronomer; computer
- Academic career
- Fields: Astronomy
- Institutions: Pulkovo Observatory

Maria Vasilyevna Zhilova (Russian: Мария Васильевна Жилова; 1870–1934) was the first female professional astronomer in the Russian Empire. She worked as astronomer and orbit calculator at the Pulkovo Observatory from 1895 to 1930.

== Life and work ==
Zhilova was born in Rybinsk, Russia.

In 1905 she was given an award by the Russian Astronomical Society for her work in celestial mechanics.

The asteroid 1255 Schilowa was named after her in 1932, at first spelled "Shilowa" (Russian: Ж и л о в а). The crater Zhilova on Venus was named after her in 1985.

She was one of the women discussed in a 2017 conference on "Women's Faces of Russian Science", where she was noted as "one of the first professional woman astronomers".

She died in Saint Petersburg in 1934.

== Selected publications ==
- "Grossenbestimmung der Sterne im Sternhaufen 20 Vulpeculae". St. Petersb. AC. Sci. Bull. 2: 243–51. 1895.
- Investigation of the spectrum of the star α Bootis according to spectrograms obtained in Pulkovo in 1906. In: Zapiski Imperatorskoj akademii nauk. VIII. series, After physical-mathematical division, Volume 23, 1908, No. 3
