= Adl (newspaper) =

Iranian newspaper in Fars province

- Type: Newspaper
- Founder: Mohammad sadegh Sharif
- Founded: 1915
- Language: Persian
- City: Shiraz
- Country: Iran

Adl (Persian: عدل) is an Iranian newspaper in Fars province. The concessionaire of this newspaper was Mohammadsadegh Sharif known as Setoodeh and it was published in Shiraz since 1915.

== See also ==
- List of magazines and newspapers of Fars
