= Banibrata Mukhopadhyay =

Banibrata Mukhopadhyay is an Indian Scientist/Astrophysicist and a professor of Physics at the Indian Institute of Science, Bangalore, India, born at Kolkata, India to Pulak Mukhopadhyay, a biologist, and Tapati Mukhopadhyay, an academic. Mukhopadhyay's mother tongue is Bengali.

== Research interests ==
Mukhopadhyay's research interests include black holes, white dwarfs and neutron stars (called as compact astrophysical objects), in general, relativistic, high energy and nuclear astrophysics; astrophysical fluid dynamics and other related/similar fluid flows; Einstein's general relativity and its possible modifications and their applications to understand enigmatic astrophysical observations; and field theory in curved spacetime including baryogenesis.

== Awards and recognition ==
In recognition of his work, Mukhopadhyay has received the following awards:

- B. M. Birla Science Prize in Physics, 2012,
- Vainu Bappu Gold Medal, 2006,
