= Wide Field Survey Telescope =

Chinese telescope

- Location: Lenghu, Mangnai, Haixi Mongol and Tibetan Autonomous Prefecture, Qinghai, PRC
- Coordinates: 38°36′24″N 93°53′46″E
- Organization: Chinese Academy of Sciences; Purple Mountain Observatory; University of Science and Technology of China
- Altitude: 4,200 m (13,800 ft)
- First light: 17 September 2023
- Diameter: 2.5 m (8 ft 2 in)
- Website: wfst.ustc.edu.cn
- Location within China

The Wide Field Survey Telescope (WFST) is a Chinese telescope characterized by a 2.5-metre primary mirror, dedicated to time-domain surveys, tracking objects that change during observation such as supernovae. It saw first light on 17 September 2023 when the WFST imaged the Andromeda Galaxy. The telescope operates at six wavelength bands spanning 320 to 1028 nm; with a 3° field of view, it can reach objects as faint as 23rd magnitude.

The telescope - nicknamed Mozi after an ancient Chinese philosopher and optics pioneer - is located on the Tibetan Plateau, near Lenghu Town in Qinghai Province, at an altitude of 4200 metres. The project to build the telescope was begun in 2017 by the University of Science and Technology of China in Hefei and the Purple Mountain Observatory of the Chinese Academy of Sciences in Nanjing. After a three-month pilot survey, the telescope is anticipated to begin a 6-year mission in 2024.

Utilizing the site would address a notable gap within the current global network of high-altitude, advanced observatory complexes. This would facilitate more consistent monitoring of rapidly evolving astronomical phenomena, such as supernovae. Presently, many leading observatories are concentrated in the Western Hemisphere, including Maunakea in Hawaii, Cerro Paranal in Chile, and La Palma in the Canary Islands.

== See also ==
- List of largest optical reflecting telescopes
- List of observatories
