= G. C. Anupama =

Indian astronomer

G. C. Anupama is a former Dean and Senior Professor (retired) at the Indian Institute of Astrophysics (IIA) in Bengaluru. She served as president of the Astronomical Society of India (ASI) from 2019 to 2022, becoming the first woman to head this association of professional astronomers in India. Anupama was a core member of the Indian team that is part of the international effort to establish the Thirty Meter Telescope (TMT) in Hawaii, USA. As the Lead, India-TMT Optics Group, she played a significant role in establishing a national large optics fabrication facility. Anupama was also the principal investigator of the project which led to the establishment of the 0.7m wide field robotic telescope at Hanle near Leh in Ladakh, the world's ninth highest site for optical, infrared, and gamma-ray telescopes.

Anupama has published articles in the field of astronomy, with a focus on the initial physical conditions after a supernova. She has also been the editor of the Bulletin of the Astronomical Society of India and Chief Editor of the Journal of Astrophysics and Astronomy. Her research interests include studying 'transients' — objects that brighten up for a brief period before going dark in space.

== Awards and recognition ==
Anupama received the Sir C. V. Raman Young Scientist Award in 2001. She is a fellow of the Indian National Science Academy, the National Academy of Sciences, India, and the Indian Academy of Sciences. She completed her PhD in 1991 from IIA and joined IIA as a faculty member in 1995.
