= Russian Astronomical Society =

Former Russian astronomy society

The Russian Astronomical Society (Russian: Русское астрономическое общество) was a society established in Saint Petersburg, Russia in 1891 for the promotion of astronomy related studies. In 1894 the society also started publishing the scientific "Journal of the Russian Astronomical Society" (Russian: Известия Русского астрономического общества).

In 1932, the Society was merged into the All-Union Astronomical-Geodetic Society (VAGO).

== See also ==
- List of astronomical societies
