= Akash Mitra Mandal =

Akashmitra Mandal is an amateur astronomers' organization (Regd.No. MAH/557/96/Thane) in India. Its objective is to popularize astronomy and induce students, enthusiasts to make useful contributions in the field of astronomical research. It also aims to carry systematic study of the subject. It was the first organization in India to organize the amateur astronomers' Meet in India. Since its establishment in August 1986, many seminars, workshops, Basic Astronomy Courses for students and elders, Sky Watching Programmes were conducted by the organization. It has also enhanced the astronomical literature in India by publishing the "Directory of Persons Associated with Astronomy in India".

The important milestones in the brief tenure of Akashmitra Mandal are marked by some major contributions to the society in the field of astronomy in general and information dissemination in particular. Apart from the publication of Directory of Persons Associated with Astronomy in India, Akashmitra Mandal successfully measured the latitude of Kalyan city. The opening of the Astronomy Reference Library was first of its kind not only in the city but also in its vicinity.

Many young members are doing regular meteor shower observation and they are also trying to design radio antenna for radio meteor observation. The organization also provides guidance for 'Astronomy Olympiad'. Akashmitra Mandal had conducted a youth astronomy seminar, with the participation of about 200 students.

== See also ==
- List of astronomical societies
