= Swedish Astronomical Society =

The Swedish Astronomical Society (Svenska astronomiska sällskapet) a national organization in Sweden aimed at people who want to follow the achievements of astronomical research. Founded in 1919 on the initiative of astronomer Nils Nordenmark, the society has from the outset aimed to be "an intimate connection between scientists, amateur astronomers and others interested in astronomy" The society runs a program of lectures and other outreach activities, including since 2012 Sweden's annual Day and Night of Astronomy. Since 1920 society has published a quarterly Swedish-language magazine, initially Populär Astronomisk Tidskrift, since 2001 published as Populär Astronomi. The current of the society is astronomer and writer Peter Linde.

== See also ==
- List of astronomical societies
