= Irish Astronomical Society =

Irish Astronomical Society Irish: Cumann Réalteolaíocta na hÉireann
- Abbreviation: IAS Irish: CRÉ
- Formation: 1937
- Purpose: Fostering Interest in Astronomy
- Location: Ireland
- Members: Amateur and professional astronomers
- Website: http://www.irishastrosoc.org/

The Irish Astronomical Society, the oldest astronomy club in Ireland, was founded in D'Olier Street, Dublin on 5 October 1937.

The society holds public stargazing events to raise interest in astronomy. Some members bring their telescopes to these events and have been nicknamed Dublin Sidewalk Astronomers. It is also one of the founding organisations of the Irish Federation of Astronomical Societies. Most members are amateur astronomers, with some professionals.

== Publications ==
Orbit is published every two months containing articles by members and non-members. Sky-High is published annually. Both are free to members.

== History ==
The Irish Astronomical Society was founded in October 1937. The core group in its formative years included Joseph MacDermott, Uinsionn S. Deiseach (Vincent Deasy), Lorcan O hUiginn, Veronica Burns, M. A. Magennis, H. A. Haughton, Muiris Mac Ionnraic, Mrs. M. Jones, William Farquharson and William R. Mackle. It was reorganised in 1947 to allow local centres to work under a central committee. It published the Irish Astronomical Journal every quarter from 1949 to 1959. Later, Dunsink Observatory and Armagh Observatory took over publication of the journal.

By 1974, only the Dublin and Belfast centres still existed, then the Belfast one left to form the Irish Astronomical Association. The society expanded rapidly between 1988 and 1990, leading to financial strains and disagreements about the direction of the society. This led to some members to leave to form Astronomy Ireland in 1990.

== See also ==
- List of astronomical societies
