= Confederation of Indian Amateur Astronomers =

The Confederation of Indian Amateur Astronomers (CIAA) is a national level organisation of amateur astronomers in India that convenes a national meeting of members every year, and coordinates the activities of amateur astronomers throughout the country. It was established in 1993 and registered in 1994, following an Inter-University Centre for Astronomy and Astrophysics meeting in 1991.

== History ==
Astronomy in India has been a passion since the Vedic period. Records exist of scriptures on the subject since the time of the Maurya Dynasty in the (322 to 185 BCE). It came to be recognized as a science after Aryabhata penned and published the Arya-siddhānta. Today Aryabhata is regarded as the father of astronomy in India. The first Indian satellite was named after him. The Surya Siddhanta is another ancient script that explained the cosmic sciences.

This science lost its importance the British era and gradually came to be treated as an expensive science and restricted to only those academically involved. There was no room for amateurs. Several years after Independence, with the arrival of Dr. Vikram Sarabhai, the father of Indian sciences, amateur astronomy started taking roots. Due to the vast distance between locations, the high cost of telescopes, and slow communications, the need for the formation of a common platform was felt. Prof. Jayant V. Narlikar suggested that a Confederation be formed and Dr. N. C. Rana of the Inter-University Centre for Astronomy and Astrophysics in Pune was assigned this job.

The Confederation of Indian Amateur Astronomers (CIAA) was formed at the fourth All India Amateur Astronomers' Meet held at Calcutta on January 22, 1994.

== Aims and purpose ==
The Confederation is a conglomeration of amateur astronomers and amateur astronomy associations from all over India. It has a scientific advisory committee to support members in their projects and endeavours.

Indian amateur astronomers use the platform of CIAA for the use of a range of instruments to study the sky, depending on a combination of their interests and resources. Methods include simply looking at the night sky with the naked eye, using binoculars, using a variety of telescopes of varying power and quality, as well as additional sophisticated equipment, such as cameras, to study the sky in both the visual and non-visual spectrums. Some people focus on amateur telescope making as their primary interest within the hobby of amateur astronomy. Some members are interested in comet hunting, meteorite hunting, or are interested in radio astronomy.

The association conducts an annual astronomy meet for amateurs from different amateur astronomy associations from all over India. This meet is hosted by different associations every year at different locations. All amateurs are given a chance to present papers regarding any outstanding or unusual work they may have done in the vast field of astronomy at these meets.

== Looking forward ==
Registered under the Societies Act and the Bombay Public Trust Act, The Confederation of Indian Amateur Astronomer Association goals are spreading the message of astronomy into the most interior parts of the country. Lately, even amateur groups from across the borders have started involving themselves in the activities of CIAA. The confederation has appointed regional representatives and gathered information on the other amateur's activities for better interaction.

== Indian astronomy ==
Indian astronomy is slightly different from modern astronomy. Unlike the constellations the science is based on the Rashi - Twelve Zodiacal Constellations and Twenty Seven Nakshatras. The number of Nakshatras varies from 27 to 28 depending on the language and location. These Nakshatras are also known as the wives of the moon, since our celestial neighbor travels over the sky in period less than a month.

Amateur astronomers residing in rural areas use the ancient form of Hindu astronomy which is close to the Āryabhatīya, the magnum opus of Aryabhata named above. Aryabhata was an amateur astronomer. His passion for sciences began with his first encounter of the solar eclipse. He is credited as the first astronomer to make an attempt at measuring the Earth's circumference since Eratosthenes (circa 200 BC). Aryabhata accurately calculated the Earth's circumference as 24,835 miles, which was only 0.2% smaller than the actual value of 24,902 miles. Aryabhatta was the first to prepare the Indian Almanac, better known as panchangam. Rural amateur astronomers still use the panchang, while some assist the pandits in drafting the annual almanac.

Indian amateur astronomers use maps that, depending on experience and intentions, may range from simple planispheres through detailed maps of very specific areas of the night sky for getting involved in projects like photographing the whole sky, the Messier objects or observing the occultation of the stars by the Moon, or studying asteroids. A range of astronomy software is available and used by amateur astronomers, including software that generates maps of the sky, software to assist with astrophotography, and software to perform various calculations pertaining to astronomical phenomena.

== See also ==
- List of astronomical societies
