= ADL astronomical society =

Slovenian astronomical society

ADL, Astronomsko društvo Labod (Slovenian for Cygnus Astronomical Society) is the most active Slovenian astronomical society. It organises astronomy camps, lectures for youths and similar events.

The activity field of organization covers various fields of astronomy: planetary astrophotography, photometry of variable stars and objects of the Solar System, astrophotography of nebulae, monitoring the activities of meteors and comets, observation of exceptional astronomical events such as eclipses and auroras.

== See also ==
- List of astronomical societies
