= Comisión Investigadora de Accidentes de Aviación =

Aviation accident investigation authority of the Dominican Republic

Comisión Investigadora de Accidentes de Aviación (CIAA) is the aviation accident investigation authority of the Dominican Republic. Article 267 of the Law 491-06 on Civil Aviation of the Dominican Republic established the CIAA.
