= Irish Federation of Astronomical Societies =

- Abbreviation: IFAS
- Formation: 1999
- Purpose: Promote interests and development of amateur astronomical societies
- Location: Ireland
- Members: Amateur astronomical societies in the island of Ireland
- Website: https://www.irishastronomy.org/

The Irish Federation of Astronomical Societies (IFAS) is an umbrella group comprising most of the National and Regional Astronomical Societies on the Island of Ireland.

== History ==
IFAS was formed in October 1999 to provide an umbrella organisation for mutual benefit and co-operation for almost all Irish astronomical clubs and societies on the Island of Ireland, north and south.

Since its inception it has formed an on-line community for astronomers though its website.

Currently (July 2014) there are over 2,200 registered users from around the world taking part in over 12,000 different topics of astronomical interest. A monthly, sponsored astrophotography competition allows for people to pursue an added interest and better their skills, and perhaps win a prize.

== Structure ==
The federation council is made up of 2 members from each club/society, regardless of the size of the society. Out of the council, a Chairman, vice Chairman, Secretary and Treasurer are elected annually.

The IFAS Constitution details the running of IFAS.

== Events ==
IFAS holds its Annual General Meeting September and October each year.

== Member clubs ==
According to the IFAS constitution, membership is open to any astronomical clubs or societies on the island of Ireland "which are governed by a democratically elected council or committee".

The current members are:

- Irish Astronomical Association
- Irish Astronomical Society - website: Irish Astronomical Society
- Astro2
- Birr Astronomical Society
- Cork Astronomy Club
- Deise Astronomy Society
- East Antrim Astronomical Society
- Galway Astronomy Club
- National University of Ireland, Galway Astronomy Society
- Kerry Astronomy Club
- Kildare Astronomical Society
- Midlands Astronomy Club (formerly the Tullamore Astronomical Society)
- Shannonside Astronomy Club
- Slaneyside Astronomical Society
- South Dublin Astronomical Society

== See also ==
- Irish Astronomical Society
- List of astronomical societies
