= Nibiru Sociedad Astronómica =

Mexico nonprofit society

Logo introduced in 2010.

Nibiru-Astronomical Society (Spanish: Sociedad Astronomica) is a non-profit academic and student astronomical society created at the Faculty of Sciences (UNAM) of the National Autonomous University of Mexico in 2001.

The goal of the society is to create a channel linking students studying physics at the Faculty with astronomers at the Institute of Astronomy (UNAM). This is achieved through year-round biannual astronomy related activities such as conferences, courses, movie debates, planetary observations through telescopes and outings focused on archeoastronomy.

On March 24, 2009, Nibiru opened up a new astronomical society at the Metropolitan Autonomous University in Azcapotzalco (Mexico City), known as Nibiru UAM. The UAM served as a hub for student-academic astronomical activities at the north of the city until April 2010. A new astronomical society derived from the pilot program, as intended.

== Introduction ==
It has performed several important observations of astronomical phenomena, such as solar and lunar eclipses, and has been noted on several national newspapers and television stations for its activities. It has also toured several faculties at the University, creating awareness of astronomy and light pollution through telescope observations of Jupiter, Saturn, Mars and the Orion Nebula.

== Participants ==
Several important Mexican scientists from the UNAM have participated in conferences on cosmology, general relativity and astrobiology organized by the Society:

- Carlos Frenk
- Miguel Alcubierre
- Antonio Lazcano

In 2009, the Society assisted Mexican authorities with activities celebrating the International Year of Astronomy, becoming the astronomical society with the most events nationwide.
