= Astronomy Day =

Annual event

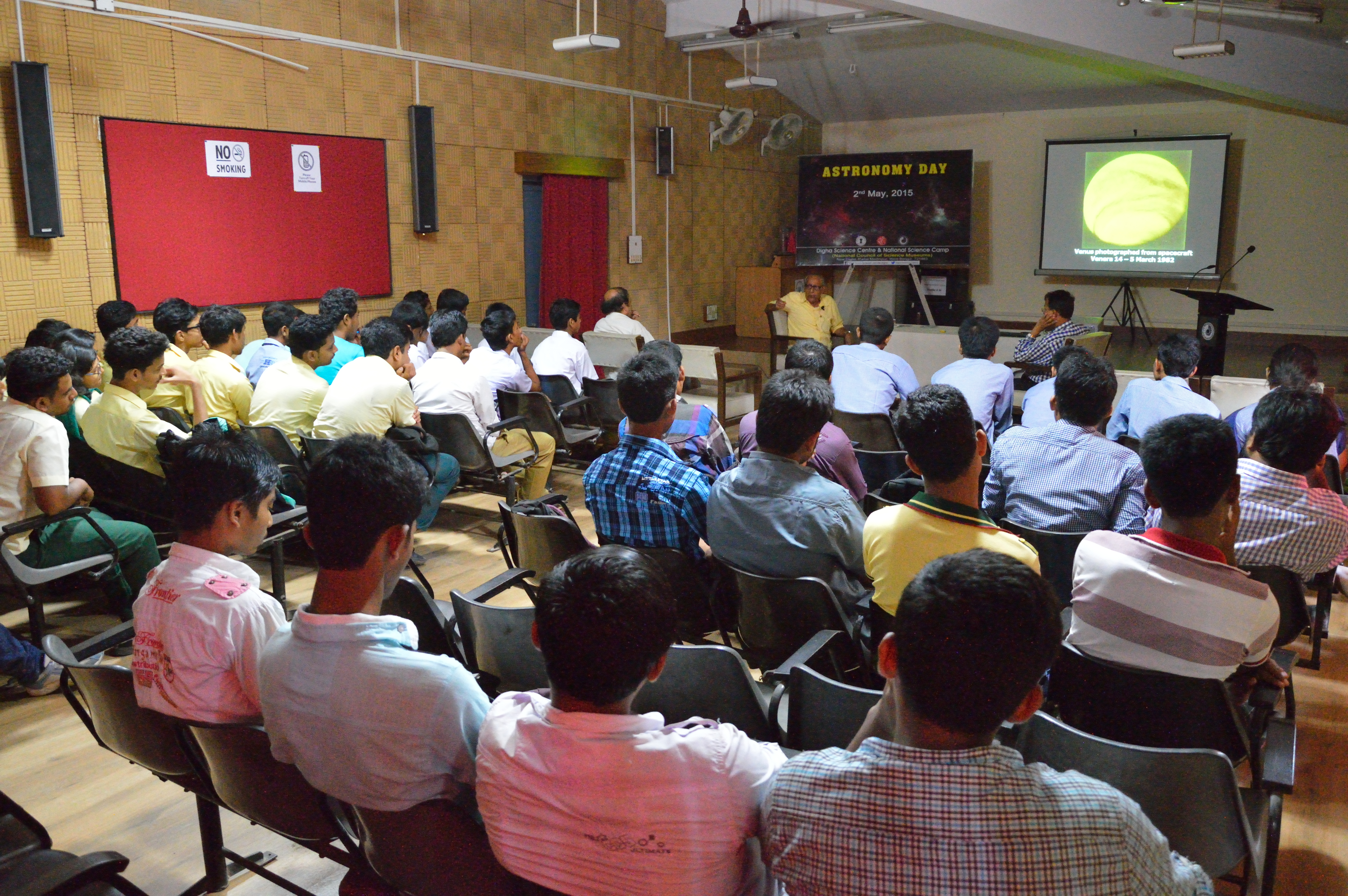
- An Astronomy Day celebration in West Bengal, India
- Status: Active
- Genre: Astronomy-related events and competitions
- Dates: Saturday between mid-April and mid-May on or just before the first quarter moon
- Frequency: Semi-annually (Spring and Fall)
- Country: United States and later others
- Years active: since 1973
- Participants: Astronomers and astronomy enthusiasts
- Website: astronomyday.astroleague.org

Astronomy Day is an annual event in various countries, intended to provide a means of interaction between the general public and various astronomy enthusiasts, groups and professionals.

== History ==
This event was started in 1973 by Doug Berger, the president of the Astronomical Association of Northern California. His intent was to set up various telescopes in busy urban locations so that passersby could enjoy views of the heavens. Since then the event has expanded and is now sponsored by a number of organizations associated with astronomy.

Originally, Astronomy Day occurred on a Saturday between mid-April and mid-May, and was scheduled so as to occur at or close to the first quarter Moon. In 2007, an autumn Astronomy Day was added. It was scheduled to occur on a Saturday between mid-September and mid-October so as to be on or close to the first quarter Moon.

== Future events ==
The Moon's influence on the schedule means that the events happen on a different date each year, rather than set calendar dates. The table below shows the dates for upcoming Astronomy Days:

Timeline of Astronomy Day events
Year	Season	Astronomy Day	First Quarter Moon
2026	Spring	April 25	April 21
2026	Autumn	September 19	September 14
2027	Spring	May 8	May 7
2027	Autumn	October 9	October 6
2028	Spring	April 29	April 25
2028	Autumn	September 23	September 24
2029	Spring	May 12	May 12
2029	Autumn	September 15	September 11
2030	Spring	May 4	May 2
2030	Autumn	September 28	September 27
2031	Spring	April 26	April 22
2031	Autumn	September 20	September 17

== Past events ==
Timeline of Astronomy Day events
Year	Season	Astronomy Day	First Quarter Moon
2005	Spring	April 16	April 16
2006	Spring	May 6	May 5
2007	Spring	April 21	April 24
2008	Spring	May 10	May 12
2009	Spring	May 2	May 1
2010	Spring	April 24	April 21
2010	Autumn	October 16	October 14
2011	Spring	May 7	May 10
2011	Autumn	October 1	October 3
2012	Spring	April 28	April 30
2012	Autumn	October 20	October 21
2013	Spring	April 20	April 18
2013	Autumn	October 13	October 11
2014	Spring	May 10	May 7
2014	Autumn	October 4	October 1
2015	Spring	April 25	April 25
2015	Autumn	September 19	September 21
2016	Spring	May 14	May 13
2016	Autumn	October 8	October 9
2017	Spring	April 29	May 2
2017	Autumn	September 30	September 27
2018	Spring	April 21	April 22
2018	Autumn	October 13	October 16
2019	Spring	May 11	May 11
2019	Autumn	October 5	October 5
2020	Spring	May 2	April 30
2020	Autumn	September 26	September 23
2021	Spring	May 15	May 19
2021	Autumn	October 9	October 12
2022	Spring	May 7	May 8
2022	Autumn	October 1	October 2
2023	Spring	April 29	April 27
2023	Autumn	September 23	September 22
2024	Spring	May 18	May 15
2024	Autumn	October 12	October 10
2025	Spring	May 3	May 4
2025	Autumn	September 27	September 29

The Astronomical League canceled the in-person event in 2020 due to the global pandemic of COVID-19 virus. Some organizations, such as the Lowell Observatory, hosted virtual events to continue the tradition.

== See also ==
Events

- Earth Hour
- Earth Day/Earth Week
- Earth Week
- 100 Hours of Astronomy (100HA)
- National Dark-Sky Week (NDSW)
- National Astronomy Week (NAW)
- World Space Week (WSW)
- White House Astronomy Night
