= Astronomers Without Borders =

Organization to promote astronomy

- Formation: May 15, 2009; 17 years ago
- Type: 501(c)(3)
- Headquarters: Calabasas, California
- Founder & President: Mike Simmons
- Board of directors: Anousheh Ansari; Tim DeBenedictis; Roy McCord; Tom Meneghini; Farah Payan; Scott Roberts; Babak Sedehi; John Spencer; Babak Tafreshi
- Website: astronomerswithoutborders.org

Astronomers Without Borders (AWB) is a U.S.-based organization founded by Mike Simmons, dedicated to spreading astronomy throughout the world and connecting people through this universal interest. Projects include crowdfunding in developed countries to sponsor the purchase of equipment and training for people in developing countries. The group's aim is to create "goodwill and understanding" across all boundaries through the sharing of astronomy.

The group was founded in 2007, and achieved official tax-free status in 2009, which was the International Year of Astronomy (IYA2009). AWB sponsored several events that year, including The World At Night (TWAN), and assisted in the IYA2009's Global Cornerstone Project 100 Hours of Astronomy. Utilizing important historical and natural settings across the globe, The World at Night created wide-angle images of the sky, in order to show the universality of star-gazing. 100 Hours of Astronomy ran April 2–5, 2009, the goal of which was to get as many people across the world to look through optical telescopes. The World at Night was the idea of Babak A. Tafreshi, the editor of Iran's Nojum Magazine, at the time the only astronomy magazine in the Middle East.

As a follow-up to 100 Hours of Astronomy, the group has organized Global Astronomy Month every April since 2010.

== See also ==
- List of astronomical societies
