= Globe at Night =

Citizen science project

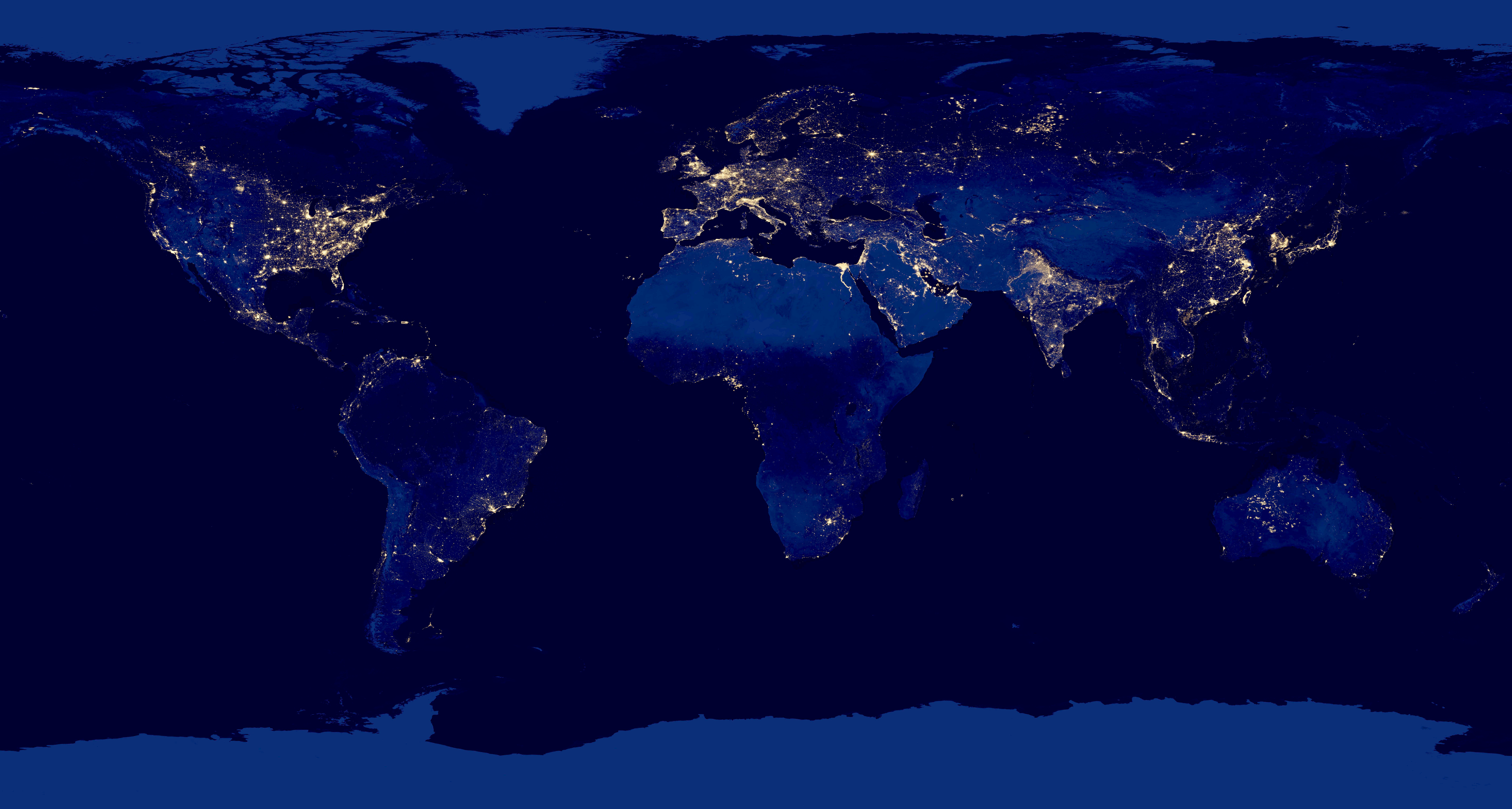
- Artificial lights showing the locations of light pollution in October 2012
- Keywords: Light Pollution, Astronomy, Scotobiology, Citizen Science, Crowdsourcing
- Funding agency: National Science Foundation via NOIRLab
- Objective: Measuring and raising awareness of artificial light pollution
- Project coordinator: AURA, Connie Walker
- Partners: International Dark-Sky Association, CADIAS
- Duration: 2006 –
- Website: Official website

Globe at Night is an international scientific research program that crowdsources measurements of light pollution in the night sky. At set time periods within each year, the project asks people to count the number of stars that they can see from their location and report it to the project's website. The coordinating researchers compile this information to produce a public, freely available map of global light pollution. By September 2011, almost 70,000 measurements had been made. The use of data collected by the public makes the program an example of citizen science. Globe at Night began as a NASA educational program in the US organized by the NOAO, and was expanded internationally during the 2009 International Year of Astronomy; it is an offshoot of the GLOBE Program, which focuses on school-based science education.

== Scientific rationale ==
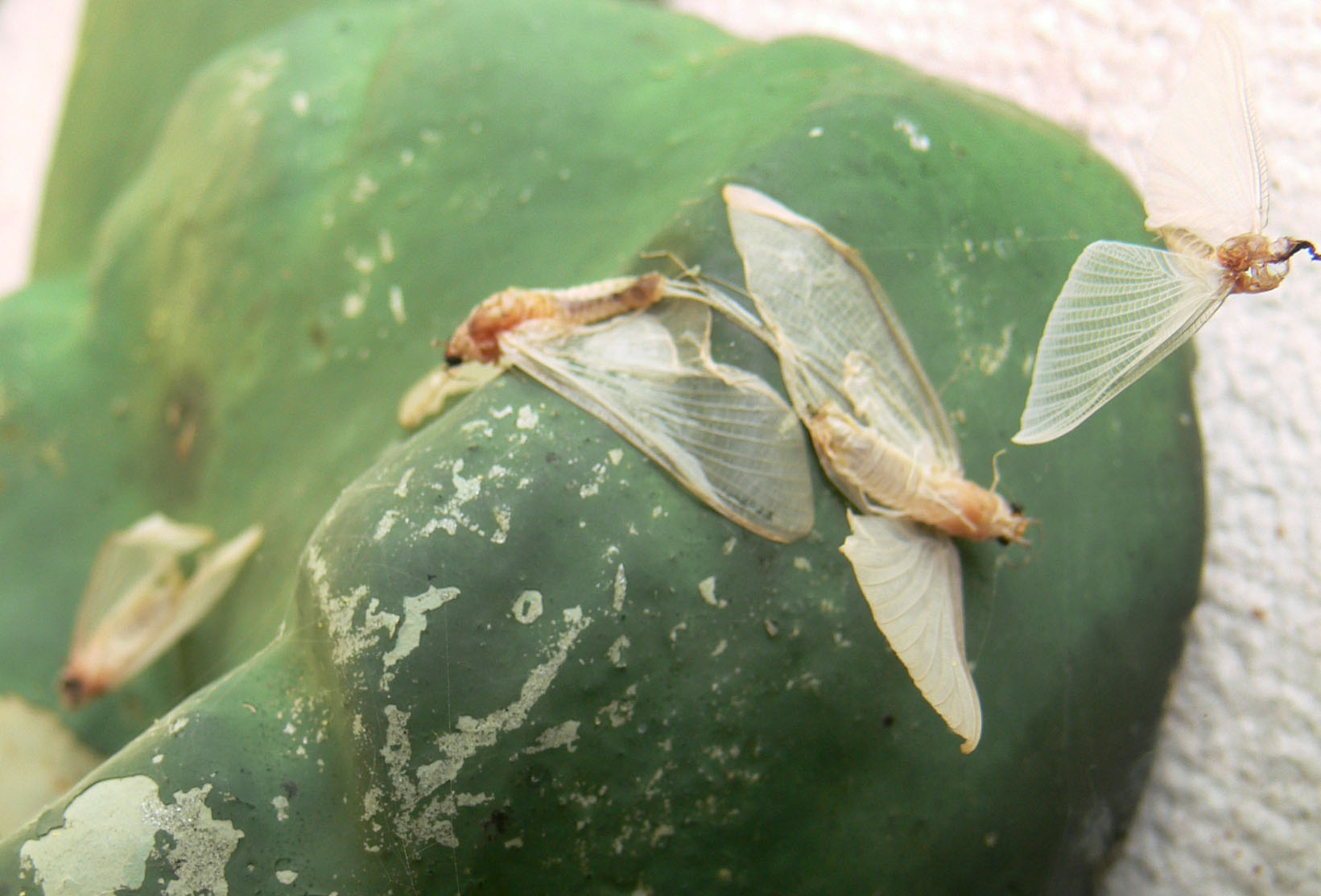
Artificial lights attract many insects, to the advantage of some spiders, as on this lighted bridge over the Loire River, France. These changes in behavior can then affect food webs and cause further knock-on effects.

Light pollution, the introduction of artificial light into formerly dark ecosystems, has numerous adverse ecological effects. Exposure to artificial light can prove fatal for some organisms (e.g. moths that fly into a burning flame), can interrupt a life cycle phase for others (e.g. glowworms are unable to attract mates), and can reduce the possibilities for finding food (because of increased risk of predation). Light at night can also interfere with the chronobiology of many animals, including humans, through suppression of melatonin secretion.

There are also cultural and economic reasons for concern about excessive light at night. Skyglow prevents large fractions of the Earth's population from viewing the Milky Way, which drove the development of much of ancient science, mythology, and religion. In the US, the cost of generating wasted light is estimated to be 7 billion US dollars per year; the production of the electricity for this wasted light also results in the release of chemical pollution and greenhouse gases.

The Globe at Night project has two main goals: raise public awareness of light pollution and its effects, and provide global mapping data for light pollution.

== Method ==
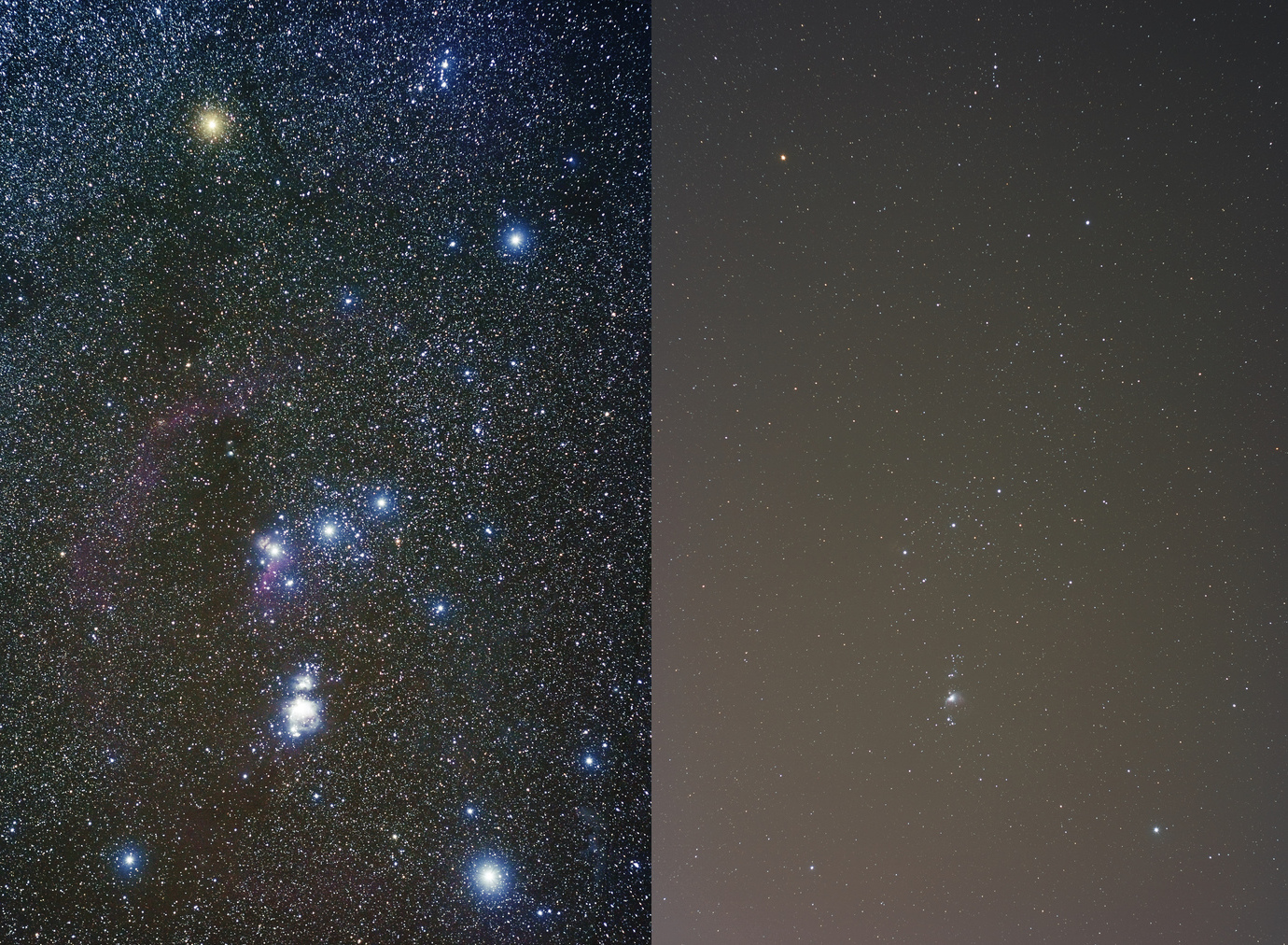
The visibility of the constellation Orion varies depending on the observer's local level of light pollution; clear sky is on left, light-polluted sky is on right. Note that the photo at left shows more detail than can be seen with the human eye.

Earth 360 animation

The project asks members of the public to go outside on dark moonless nights and report how many stars are visible in particular constellations. The project focuses on students, teachers, and families, and has produced activity packets in 13 languages. NASA encourages students in its INSPIRE program to participate.

Participating individuals are asked to go outside on specified dates at least an hour after sunset, then let their eyes adjust to the ambient light level, and observe a specific constellation: Orion or Leo in the Northern Hemisphere, Crux in the Southern Hemisphere. The choice of a two-week span of dates near the new moon removes any effect on sky brightness from scattered moonlight, and observing well after sunset prevents any lingering light from twilight. By comparing the stars they see with star charts showing stellar visibility under different light pollution conditions, they qualitatively measure light pollution. Stellar visibility can also be measured for the project using a Sky Quality Meter, a tool used by amateur astronomers. These light pollution data are then submitted to the coordinating website via a web browser. The assembled data are provided to researchers and the public via a mapping interface that displays the data overlaid on Google Maps.

With this technique, observers are reporting a naked eye limiting magnitude (NELM) between 1 and 7. Humans are able to observe stars below 7th magnitude, although this may require blocking out other sources of light. Under clear, unpolluted skies, the measurement of NELM should be strongly correlated with the level of light pollution. Other factors, particularly those that reduce the seeing, can reduce NELM:

- atmospheric water content (especially clouds)
- atmospheric aerosols such as dust or air pollution
- visual acuity of the observer
- wind (can cause stars to twinkle, and render dim stars invisible)
- aurora
- airglow, gegenschein, and Zodiacal light
- age of the observer
- Presence of the Milky Way

Globe at Night also distributes teaching kits that demonstrate how fully shielded lights reduce glare and improve the visibility of the night sky.

== Accuracy of measurements ==
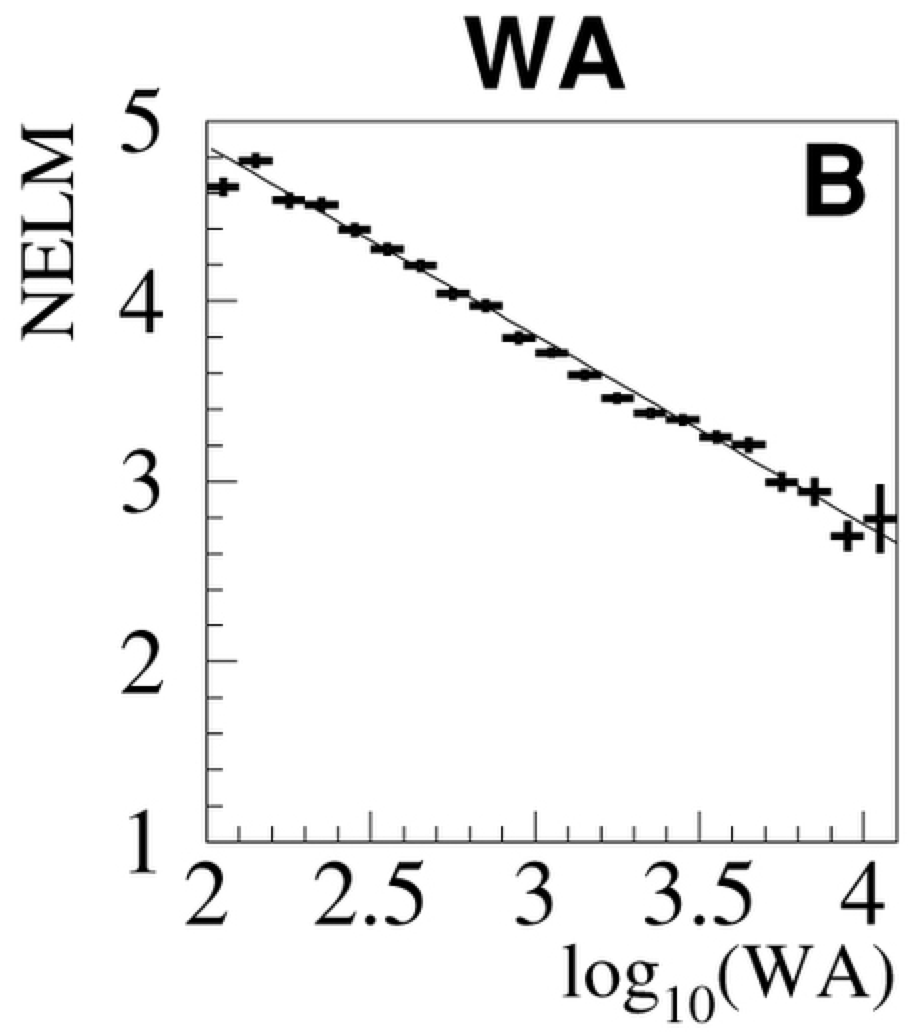
When Globe at Night observations are averaged together, they are very strongly related to the sky brightness in the location. This is a single panel from this image.

The standard deviation of an individual Globe at Night observation is approximately 1.2 stellar magnitudes. Due to the law of large numbers, when the observations are considered in aggregate, the errors from individual observations cancel each other out, leading to very stable mean values. This means that Globe at Night observations could be used to estimate global or regional trends in sky luminance.

== Conversion of measurements into other units ==
Globe at Night observations identify the dimmest stars that are visible given the surrounding conditions. Assuming normal visible acuity and clear skies, it is possible to approximately convert Globe at Night naked eye limiting maximum estimates into other units:

NELM	Visible stars	mcd/m^{2}	mag/arcsec^{2}
1	10	160	14.6
2	30	60	15.6
3	80	20	16.6
4	250	8	17.8
5	800	3	19.0
6	2,500	0.8	20.4
7	7,000	0.2	22.0

== History ==
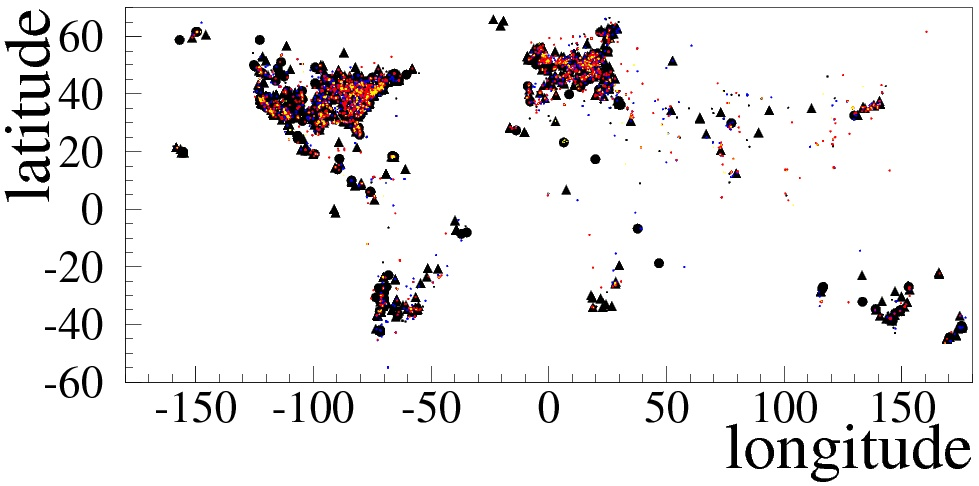
Locations of Globe at Night observations from 2009 to 2011

The Globe at Night project was launched as a NASA program in the United States. The project quickly expanded internationally, and was part of the outreach effort of the International Year of Astronomy in 2009. The size of the project (in terms of number of observations) expanded dramatically in that year. In 2014, the project expanded to also include data obtained via the Loss of the Night app for Android devices, and the Dark Sky Meter app for iOS devices. In addition, new star charts were added to extend the standard map based campaign throughout the whole year. In 2015, as part of the International Year of Light, two "International Nights of Skyglow Observation" were introduced, to encourage data submission in March and September.

The number of observations for each year are reported on the Globe at Night webpage:

Year	Total Observations	Notes
2006	3,990	
2007	8,490	
2008	6,838	
2009	15,300	
2010	17,805	
2011	14,249	
2012	16,848	
2013	16,342	
2014	20,910	Started including data from Loss of the Night & Dark Sky Meter Apps.
2015	23,041	
2016	14,507	
2017	15,382	
2018	8,069	
2019	10,198	
2020	29,508	
2021	25,558	
2022	19,950	

== Spinoff research ==
Data from the Globe at Night program has also been used in a study of the effects of artificial lighting on the foraging habits of bats.

== See also ==
- Bortle scale
- Connie Walker (astronomer)
- Earth Hour
- Ecological light pollution
- History of street lighting in the United States
- International Dark Sky Association
- List of astronomical societies
