= Global Science Opera =

The Global Science Opera (GSO) is a creative education initiative that combines science, art, technology, and education in a global network of scientists, art and education institutions and projects. Using digital interaction, schools, universities and art and institutions from over 30 participating countries perform and live-stream Global Science Opera performances. One team in each participating country is invited to develop a two-minute scene for the opera, with all the scenes being performed together on a designated date as a continuous, real-time event that viewers can watch online.

== History ==
Global Science Opera began in May 2014 as a collaboration between the European Commission's CREAT-IT project and representatives of the following initiatives:

- Write a Science Opera (WASO): A creative approach to science and art inquiry in schools, developed at the Western Norway University of Applied Sciences
- The Galileo Teacher Training Program (GTTP) and Global Hands-On Universe (GHOU): Global networks of science teachers
- Distance Learning: ICT-based connections amongst rural schools, led by the educational organization Ellinogermaniki Agogi in Athens, Greece

Their idea for the first Global Science Opera production, "SkyLight", was proposed to the International Astronomical Union as an official initiative of the International Year of Light 2015. After the proposal's approval in July 2014, a network of institutions in 38 countries, encompassing schools, universities, operas, and science and art institutions, were invited to participate in the first GSO production. Preparation took place between July 2014 and October 2015, based on a flat hierarchy infrastructure and the philosophy "Democracy, respect and friendship was, and will be, the heart of this community." In 2016, GSO was announced as a flagship initiative of the European Commission's project "Developing an Engaging Science Classroom (CREATIONS)" and is a Case Study in the Norwegian Research Council's project "Integrating Science of Oceans, Physics and Education (iSCOPE)".

== Productions ==
=== SkyLight ===
SkyLight was performed on October 3, 2015, in collaboration with Lunar Mission One, as part of World Space Week 2015. The artwork for the SkyLight poster was provided by space and nature photographer Babak Tafreshi. The science opera was live-streamed by the 31 participating countries, including schools, universities, art institutions and volunteers, and coincided with the final conference of the CREAT-IT project. SkyLight – a Global Science Opera was screened during the International Year of Light 2015 closing ceremony and film festival in the Centro de convenciones de Yucatán, Mexico.

Presentations of SkyLight

| Event | City | Country | Year |
|---|---|---|---|
| European Planetary Science Congress | Cascais | Portugal | 2015 |
| Lunar Mission One event at The Royal Institution | London | England | 2015 |
| CREAT-IT conference | Athens | Greece | 2015 |
| The Greek Physical Society | Athens | Greece | 2015 |
| European Network of Opera & Dance Education Conference | Bristol | England | 2016 |

=== Ghost Particles ===
Global Science Opera's second production, Ghost Particles, was performed globally on November 19, 2016, by 20 participating countries and streamed online by TV Haugaland. The chosen scientific theme was 'particle physics', with the opera exploring the science and discoveries of Higgs Boson, Neutrinos and Photons. The opera incorporated a virtual visit to CERN Compact Muon Solenoid. The 2016 GSO also involved the cooperation of the European Commissions' Horizons 2020 Project CREATIONS cooperated and was a research focus for the Norwegian Research Council's project "iSCOPE".

=== Moon Village ===
The 2017 Global Science Opera, Moon Village, will involve 25 countries and was streamed online December 13. It explores the process, science and technology of the European Space Agency's Moon Village.

=== One Ocean ===
Ocean health is the scientific topic for One Ocean, with IMBER as official scientific partner.

=== Gravity ===
GRAVITY! is the Global Science Opera's 5th production. The opera's story was created by students in Brazil, Portugal and São Tomé and Príncipe. It celebrates the 100th anniversary of Eddington proof Einstein's Theory of General Relativity. Premieres on the International Children's Day: November 20, 2019 on YouTube.

=== Energize ===
Global Science Opera 2020 focuses on energy and sustainability. The main story is produced by students in Australia, but with contributions from 17 countries. World-wide premiere on YouTube November 20, 2020.

=== Thrive ===
The scientific topic for the 2021 Global Science Opera production is inspired by the UN's Decade of Ecosystem Restoration and supported by the UN's Environment Programme. Premiere on YouTube/Vimeo November 20, 2021.

=== Creavolution ===
The scientific topic for the 2022 Global Science Opera production is inspired by the creative mind. "We need a creative revolution in our evolution required for a healthy, sustainable future. Join the Creavolution!" This year's production is created in collaboration with the Erasmus-project GSO4SCHOOL, an EU-funded research-project which trains teachers and students while strengthening international collaboration. Premiere on YouTube/Vimeo November 20, 2022.
