= Connie Walker (astronomer) =

American astronomer

Constance Elaine Walker
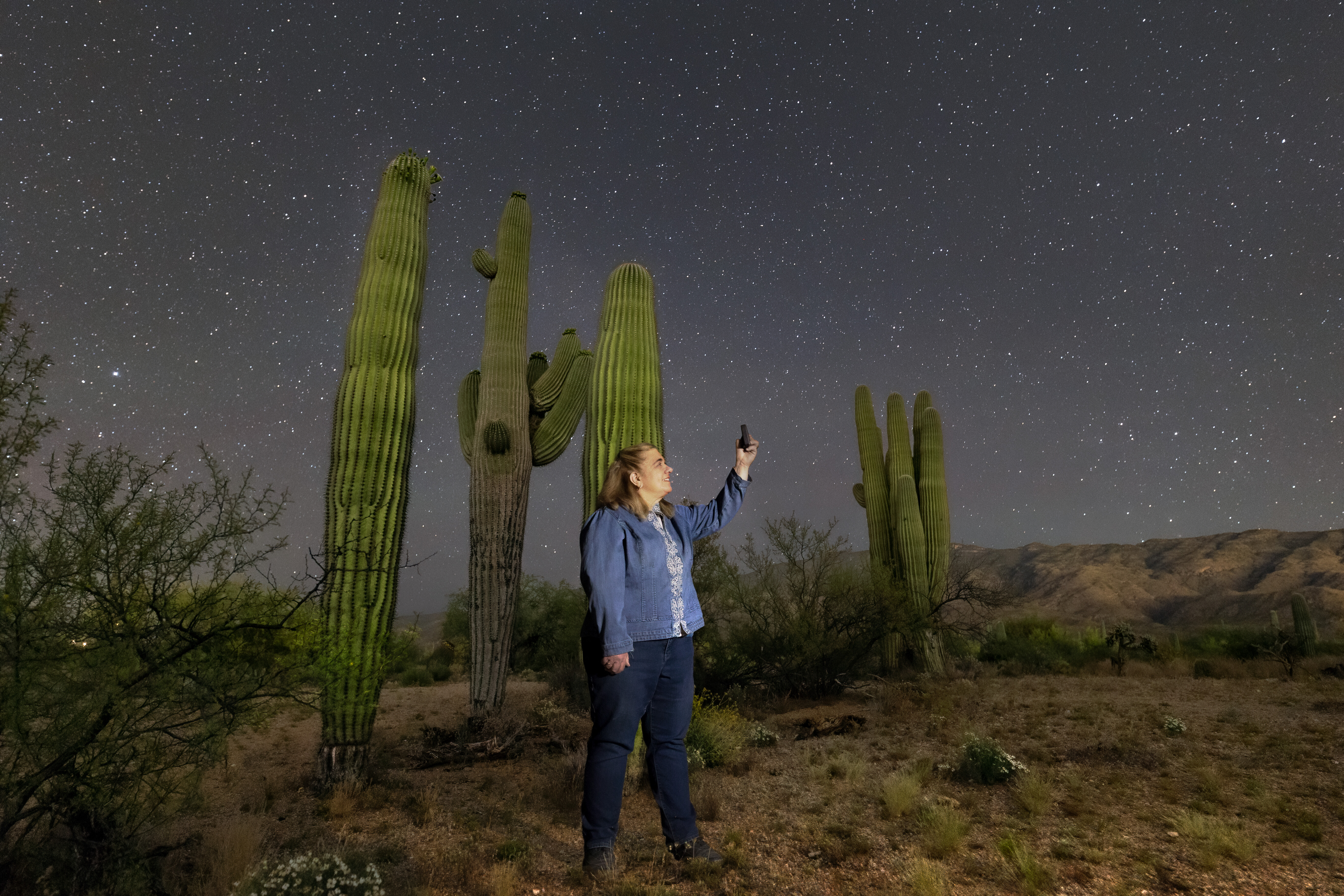
- C. Walker collecting data for Globe at Night near Tucson, Arizona.
- Born: 1957 (age 68–69)
- Education: Smith College; University of Massachusetts; University of Arizona
- Awards: Hoag-Robinson award (2011)
- Scientific career
- Fields: Astronomy
- Workplaces: National Optical Astronomy Observatory
- Thesis: A submillimeter-millimeterwave study of the molecular gas in the nuclear regions of three nearby starburst galaxies. (1991)
- Doctoral advisor: Robert N. Martin

Connie Walker (born 1957) is an American astronomer and senior employee of the National Optical Astronomy Observatory (NOAO).

Walker earned her bachelor's degree in physics and astronomy from Smith College, her master's degree in electrical engineering and computer engineering from the University of Massachusetts, and her Ph.D. in astronomy from the University of Arizona. She was advised by Robert N. Martin and her dissertation's title from 1991 was "A submillimeter-millimeterwave study of the molecular gas in the nuclear regions of three nearby starburst galaxies."

Walker works in the NOAO's Research Based Science Education department, helping teachers develop curricula to help children learn about astronomy. She is the director of both GLOBE at Night and Project Astro, and is a member of the board of directors of the International Dark Sky Association and the Astronomical Society of the Pacific. She was also chair of the International Year of Astronomy Dark Skies Awareness project, and continues to chair the dark skies awareness programs of Global Astronomy Month. Walker also serves on commission 50 of the International Astronomical Union.

Walker is very active in outreach and education about astronomy and light pollution. She has worked at NOAO since 2001.

Walker was honored by having an asteroid, 29292 Conniewalker, named after her.
