= Babak Tafreshi =

Iranian photographer and astronomer

- Born: 1978 (age 48)
- Occupation: Photographer
- Years active: 1997-present
- Organization: National Geographic Society
- Notable work: The World at Night, National Parks at Night, From Above & Below
- Spouse: Shadi Hamedi (2002-present)
- Children: 1
- Honours: Minor planet Tafreshi, National Geographic Explorer at Large
- Website: babaktafreshi.com

Babak Tafreshi (Persian: بابک امین تفرشی, born 1978 in Tehran, Iran) is an Iranian-American photojournalist, science communicator, public speaker, cinematographer and National Geographic Explorer at Large. He is the creator and director of The World At Night (TWAN), a 20-year project that involves nearly 40 photographers in about 20 countries to document night skies and celestial happenings in images and videos. Tafreshi resides in the Boston area.

== Early Life ==
Babak Tafreshi was born in Tehran in 1978. He became interested in astronomy and astrophotography at age 13 after observing the moon through a telescope. He studied physics at a university in Tehran to become an astronomer, then shifted to science journalism. From 1997 to 2011 Tafreshi taught practical astronomy and directed public outreach programs across Iran. During this period, he served for several years as the editor-in-chief of Nojum an Iranian monthly astronomy magazine and appeared on over 100 television science broadcasts prior to leaving Iran in 2011.

In 2007, he created The World at Night project together with American science communicator Mike Simmons who founded Astronomers Without Borders. Tafreshi served as a board member of this organization for several years, and served as a project coordinator for the International Year of Astronomy (IYA2009).

== Photography ==
Tafreshi's work bridges art and science, cultures and the night sky, and aims to reconnect humanity with the natural nights. He has documented astronomical events and night skies across all seven continents through photos, videos and immersive media including 360 VR and fulldome planetarium imagery. Since 2012 he has documented numerous U.S. National Parks at night, and his work frequently advocates for dark-sky preservation. He is a contributing photographer for Sky & Telescope, the European Southern Observatory (ESO), and an Ambassador for NSF NOIRLab (US national center for ground-based astronomy). His astrophotography has been featured more than 60 times by Astronomy Picture of the Day, a popular NASA webpage.

Full Dome & Immersive Experiences

- 2026 – An immersive planetarium show created for musician Phoebe Bridgers for the release of her album “Lost Weekend“. The one-hour pure cinematography show, was screened in about 40 planetariums worldwide and featured during a live performance at the Liberty Science Center.
- 2019 - Áróra – an award-winning 8K planetarium show about the Northern Lights created for the Perlan Museum in Reykjavik, Iceland.
- The World at Night in Virtual Reality - 360-degree panorama images presented in VR

== National Geographic Career ==
In 2012 Tafreshi expanded his global nightscape portfolio when he joined the National Geographic Image Collection.

He is credited with numerous stories as a National Geographic photographer. Life at Night Atlas is a National Geographic Society project that unites photographers, biologists and filmmakers to document nocturnal wildlife in natural dark environments.

The project documents the ecological impacts of artificial light pollution on migratory birds, marine life, insects and pollinators. Its primary focus is raising public awareness about dark sky preservation, and nocturnal ecosystem protection.

As part of the National Geographic Live speaker series, Tafreshi presents Earth After Dark, a lecture series featuring photographs and videos of night skies ranging from dark national parks to illuminated urban areas. The presentation covers astronomical events and celestial bodies as well as the impact of light pollution on natural night skies. and ecosystems.

Above and Below is a first-of-its-kind Earth-and-space photography project created with NASA astronaut Don Pettit. Tafreshi and Petit capture Earth, space and twilight as seen from the orbit and on the ground. Their work provides dual perspectives of the same locations and phenomena captured nearly synchronously.

Featured Stories

- How to See the Planet from Above and Below (October 2025)
- Our Nights are getting brighter and Earth is paying the price (April 2019)
- National Geographic Pictures of the Year (2024)
- Other National Geographic articles

== Media Appearances and Public Speaking ==
Tafreshi has delivered keynotes and lectures at various institutions, including Harvard University, Stanford University, Princeton University, MIT, the National Geographic Storytellers Summit, The International Astronomical Union, the American Geophysical Union, Sustainability Expo in Bangkok, Color & Imaging Conference, the Nobel Prize Museum and Royal Astronomical Society of New Zealand.

He has appeared as an expert guest on national television coverage of astronomical events, such as live coverage of the total solar eclipse for ABC News and has been featured on notable podcasts including Neil deGrasse Tyson's StarTalk.

== Awards and Recognitions ==
- National Geographic Explorer at Large (2026),
- Royal Photography Society Award (2022) for Scientific Imaging
- Wayfinder Award by National Geographic Society (2022)
- The International Astronomical Union named the minor planet 276163 Asteroid Tafreshi (2022)
- Lennart Nilsson Award (2009) (with Caroline Porco) for outstanding contributions to scientific photography

== Exhibitions ==
- National Museum of Natural History “Lights Out: Recovering Our Night Sky”
- LUMAS galleries in Europe and US
- National Geographic 50 Greatest Landscapes -Traveling Immersive Landscapes Photography Exhibition
- National Geographic Fine Art Galleries (2015-2020)
- The World at Night Exhibits in more than 30 countries (2009-2019)

== Music Collaborations ==
Tafreshi has collaborated with orchestral ensembles, composers and contemporary musicians to provide large-scale live visual backdrops such as full dome astrophotography visuals and live stage backdrop for Phoebe Bridgers (2026) "Lost Weekend" album release and an ongoing visual collaboration with The Celestial Orchestra with Iranian-Canadian composer Barbad Bayat and the Prague Metropolitan Orchestra. Tafreshi also created background Visuals for Jack Johnson's “Meet the Moonlight” Tour (2022) and created visual projections for Boston Pops (2019) concert celebrating the 50^{th} Anniversary of the Moon Landing.

== Documentary Series ==
- "The Stars at Night" 2024
- "Perfectly a Strangeness" 2024, technical advisor
- "The Borderless Sky" 2018
- "Equator: A New World View" 2018
- "Cielo" (film) 2017, technical advisor
- "Sepideh – Reaching for the Stars" 2013, technical advisor
- "Acquainted with the Night" 2011

== Publications (books) ==
- ''Zauber der Sterne'' (in German and several other language editions). Kosmos, 2009. ISBN 978-3440124253.
- ''The World at Night''. White Lion Publishing, 2019 (in several language editions). ISBN 978-8854415829.
- ''Iceland at Night''. Forlagið, 2021 (in English). ISBN 978-9979537441.
- ''National Parks at Night''. National Geographic, 2027. ISBN 978-1984862419.

== Gallery ==
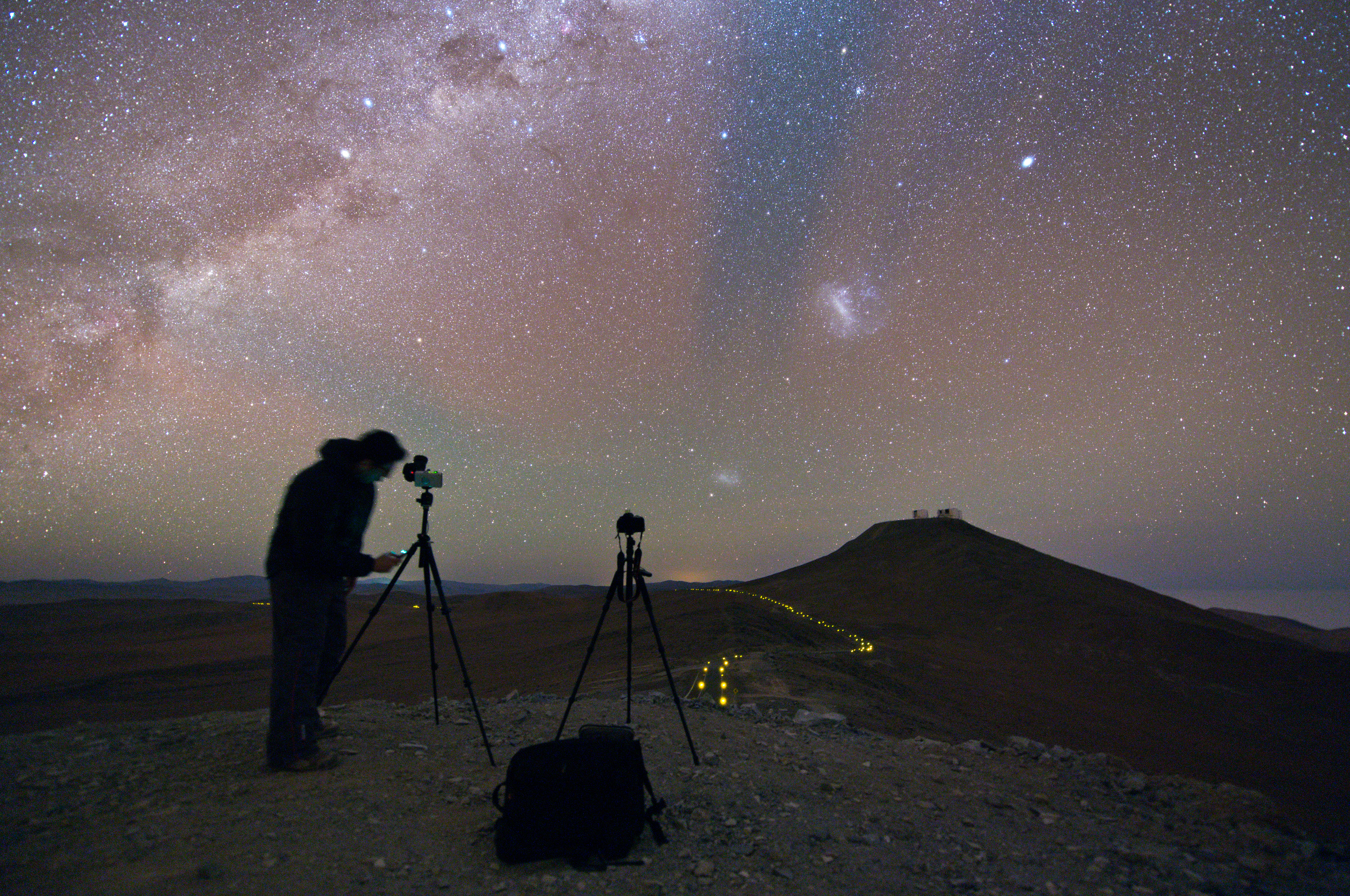
Ultra HD Expedition day 3 - Babak Tafreshi in action

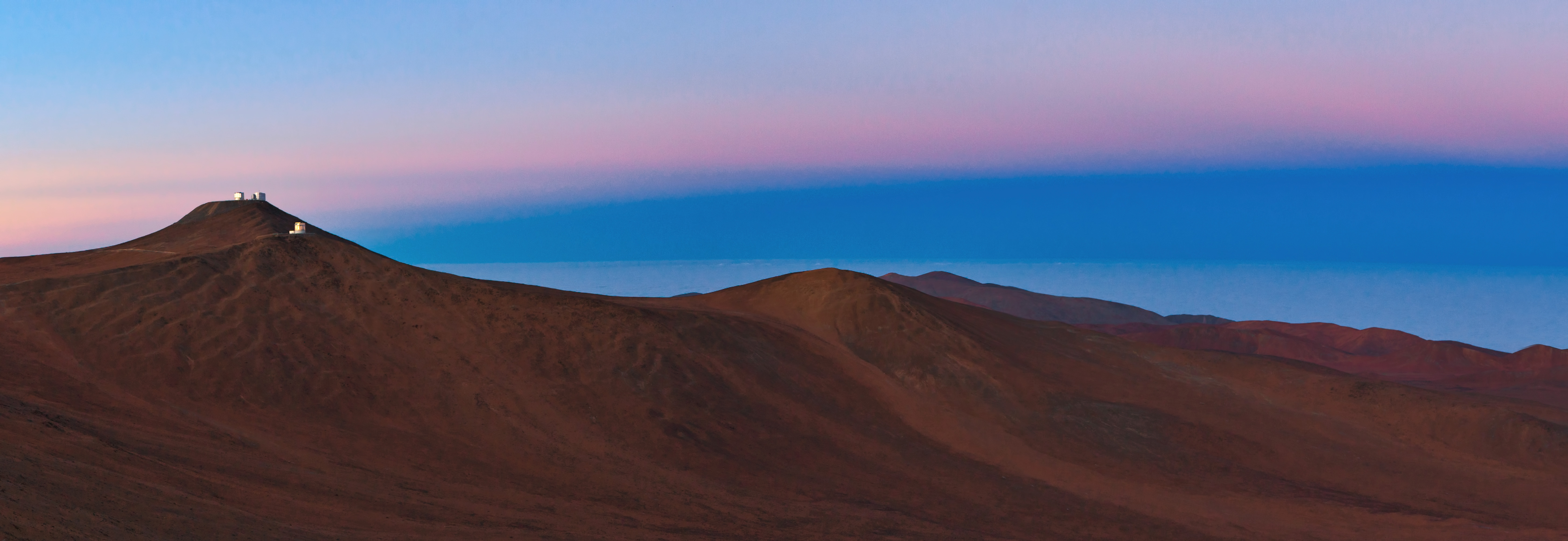
Paranal and the Shadow of the Earth

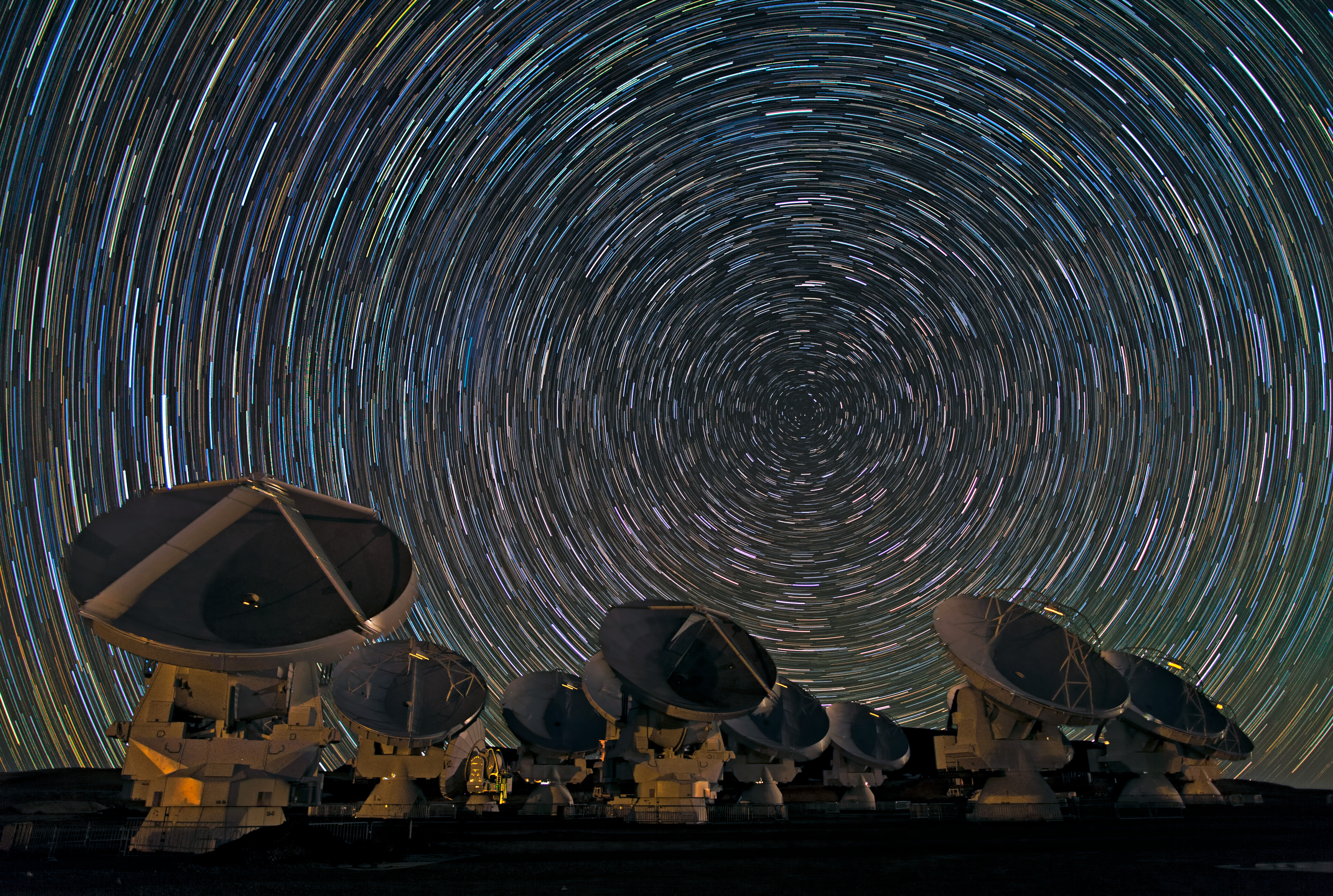
Whirling Southern Star Trails over ALMA
