= Galileoscope =

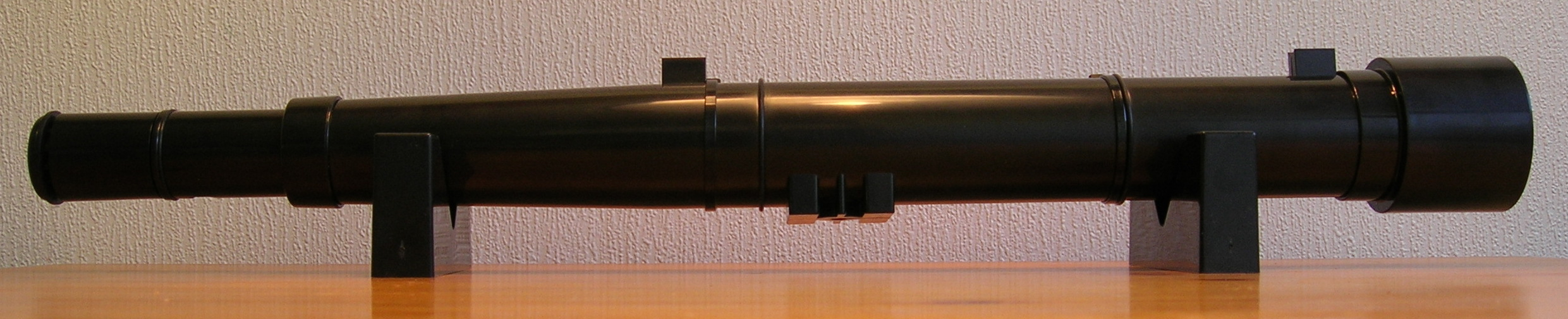
Galileoscope

The Galileoscope is a small mass-produced refractor telescope, designed with the intention of increasing public interest in astronomy and science. It was developed for the International Year of Astronomy 2009. It is meant to be an inexpensive means by which millions of people can view the same things seen by Galileo Galilei, such as the craters of Earth's Moon, four of Jupiter's moons, and the Pleiades. The small telescope has an aperture of 50 mm (2.0 in) and a relatively long focal length of 500 mm, for a focal ratio of f/10.

== Design and configurations ==
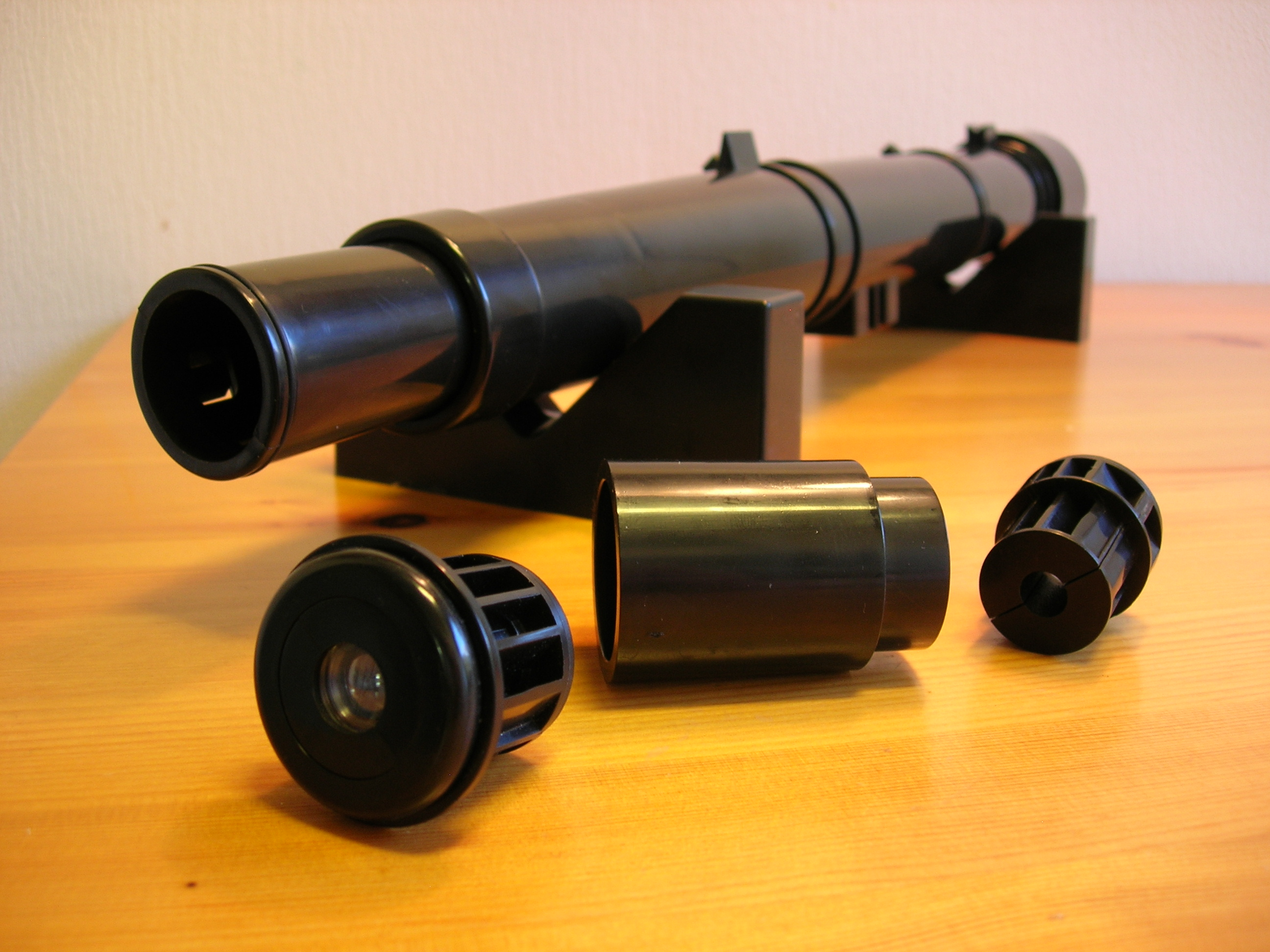
At the front, left: The four-lens main eyepiece. Middle: Barlow tube. Right: The two lens auxiliary eyepiece. Background: The focus tube and main telescope tube containing the achromatic doublet objective lens.

The Galileoscope uses a 32 mm (1 1/4 in) focuser, giving the telescope a great deal of versatility, since this is the standard size for eyepieces used in most amateur and some professional telescopes. This means the Galileoscope can be used with relatively cheap extra eyepieces to produce magnifications up to 100, or even 200 times (with a 5 mm in combination with the included 2× Barlow lens). However, a magnification of more than 125× would not be recommended for a scope this size because its focal ratio limits sharpness beyond this. Additionally, the design of the slide-in/out focusing tube, without any gears or knobs, makes it nearly impossible to focus above the 125× limit.

It also utilizes achromat glass lenses in the objective-lens – the large 51 mm (2 in) one in front – as well as in the eyepiece (4 lenses of two types of high quality plastic, known as a Plossl configuration) to prevent chromatic aberration, producing a clearer image. This is because single lenses, as are often used in cheap scopes, refract light of different colors in different angles (chromatic aberration). In practice this means all images will have blueish blurred edges on one side, reddish on the other, making the image very unclear. By using two types of glass for the two lenses this gets compensated to some degree, resulting in a sharper and clearer image. Depending on the configuration, 4, 6 or 8 lenses are used. The 4-lens configuration results in a telescope in some ways similar to Galileo's, with 17× magnification and a very small field of view. The 6-lens configuration provides 25× magnification, and the 8-lens configuration allows for 50× magnification. The user may easily switch between these configurations by changing the eyepiece.

== See also ==
- List of telescope types
