= 29292 Conniewalker =

Main-belt asteroid

Discovery
- Discovered by: C. Shoemaker; D. H. Levy
- Discovery site: Palomar Obs.
- Discovery date: 24 May 1993

Designations
- Named after: Connie Walker (astronomer)
- Alternative designations: 1993 KZ_{1}
- Minor planet category: main-belt · Phocaea

Orbital characteristics
- Epoch 4 September 2017 (JD 2458000.5)
- Uncertainty parameter 0
- Observation arc: 33.43 yr (12,212 days)
- Aphelion: 2.8157 AU
- Perihelion: 1.8802 AU
- Semi-major axis: 2.3480 AU
- Eccentricity: 0.1992
- Orbital period (sidereal): 3.60 yr (1,314 days)
- Mean anomaly: 259.91°
- Mean motion: 0° 16^{m} 26.04^{s} / day
- Inclination: 25.552°
- Longitude of ascending node: 89.840°
- Argument of perihelion: 170.01°

Physical characteristics
- Dimensions: 4.57 km (taken); 4.571 km 4.581±0.217 km
- Synodic rotation period: 30.5 h (Note: Pravec (2011): lightcurve plot of (29292) Conniewalker with a rotation period 30.5 hours and a brightness amplitude of 0.63 mag. LCDB assigns a quality code of 2, which means a result based on less than full coverage, so that the period may be wrong by 30 percent or so. Summary figures at Collaborative Asteroid Lightcurve Link (CALL)); 30.6±0.05 h
- Geometric albedo: 0.3097; 0.367±0.049; 0.3674±0.0485
- Spectral type: S
- Absolute magnitude (H): 13.10 · 13.4 · 13.5 · 13.59 · 14.03

29292 Conniewalker (provisional designation 1993 KZ_{1}) is a bright, stony Phocaea asteroid and slow tumbler from the inner regions of the asteroid belt, approximately 4.6 kilometers in diameter. It was discovered on 24 May 1993, by American astronomer Carolyn Shoemaker and Canadian astronomer David Levy at the Palomar Observatory in California, United States.

== Orbit and classification ==
Conniewalker is a member of the Phocaea family of stony asteroids (701). It orbits the Sun in the inner main-belt at a distance of 1.9–2.8 AU once every 3 years and 7 months (1,314 days). Its orbit has an eccentricity of 0.20 and an inclination of 26° with respect to the ecliptic. A first precovery was obtained at the Siding Spring Observatory in 1983, extending the body's observation arc by 10 years prior to its official discovery observation.

== Physical characteristics ==
=== Rotation period ===
In 2011, rotational lightcurves of Conniewalker were obtained at the Via Capote Observatory in California (G69) and at the Ondřejov Observatory in the Czech Republic. Lightcurve analysis gave a rotation period of 30.5 and 30.6 hours, with a brightness amplitude of 0.63 and 0.62 magnitude, respectively (U=2/3-).

Conniewalker is a tumbler. The non-principal axis rotation (NPAR) has been observed during 22 sessions over a 46-day period. The slow tumbler had previously been a target in ASU's Photometric Survey for Asynchronous Binary Asteroids.

=== Diameter and albedo ===
According to the survey carried out by the NEOWISE mission of NASA's Wide-field Infrared Survey Explorer, Conniewalker measures 4.581 kilometers in diameter and has a bright surface albedo of 0.367. The Collaborative Asteroid Lightcurve Link adopts the revised WISE-data by Petr Pravec, that is, an albedo of 0.3097 and a diameter of 4.571 kilometers with an absolute magnitude of 13.10.

== Naming ==
This minor planet was named in honor of American astronomer Connie Walker (born 1957), who has examined the formation of stars in galaxies in varying stages of development. She is well known for the educational Project Astro-Tucson and her successful work in astronomy with children and young adults in Arizona. The official naming citation was published by the Minor Planet Center on 7 January 2004 (M.P.C. 50464).
