= White House Astronomy Night =

Annual event organized by the White House

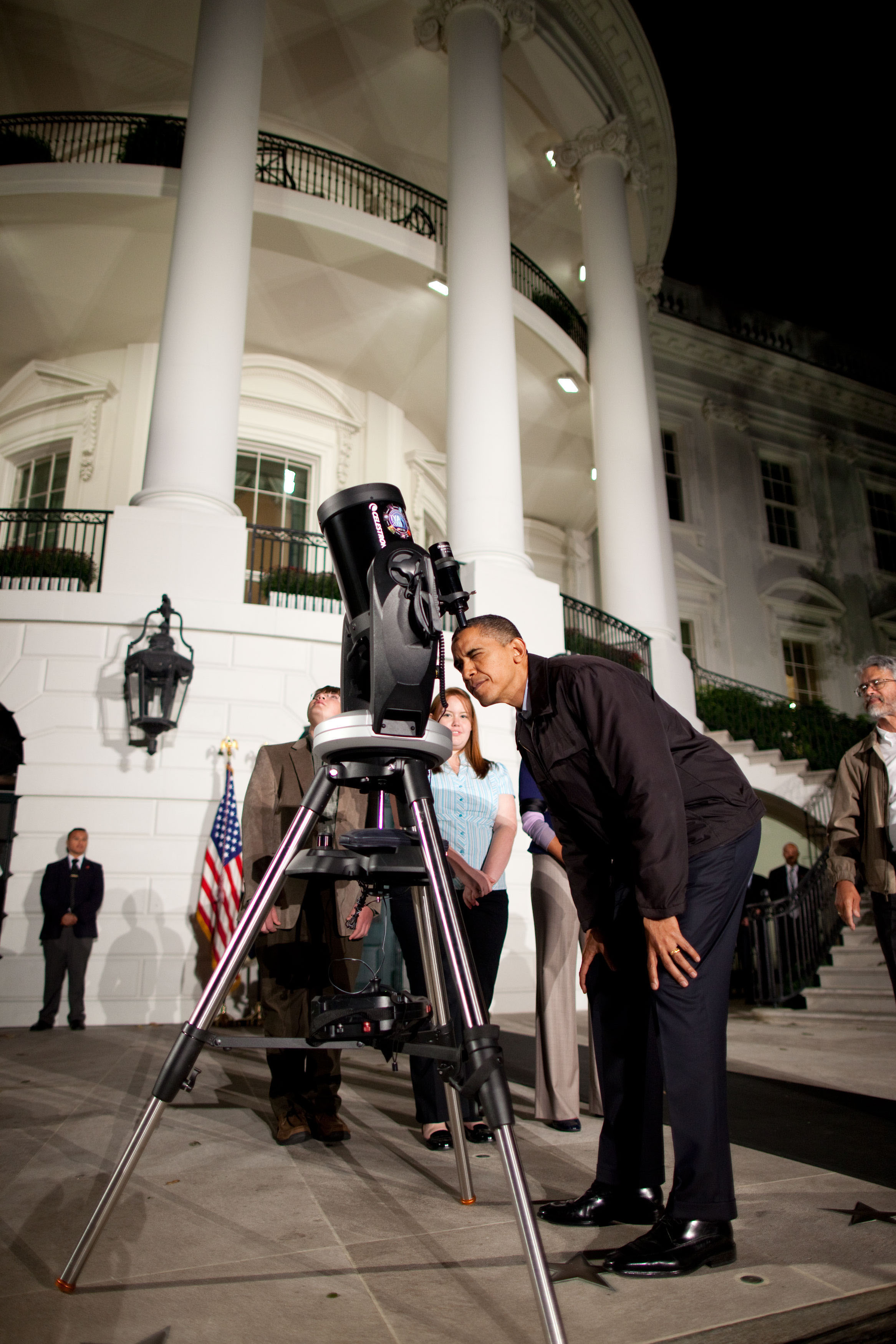
President Barack Obama looks through a telescope during the first White House Astronomy Night (October 7, 2009)

White House Astronomy Night (and alternatively Astronomy Night on the National Mall) is an event first organized by the White House in conjunction with the Office of Science and Technology Policy to motivate interest in astronomy and science education. The original White House Astronomy Night was held in 2009 on the South Lawn. In 2010 the White House and the Office of Science and Technology Policy organized a similar event with help from Hofstra University, this time held on the National Mall. Between 2010 and 2014 annual events took place at the National Mall with coordination between Hofstra University and federal agencies including: the Smithsonian National Air and Space Museum, NASA, and the National Science Foundation. In 2015 an event took place in June at the National Mall, and then back at the White House again on October 19.

The 2012 book Rising Above the Gathering Storm by the National Academies of Sciences, Engineering, and Medicine noted the White House Astronomy Night indicated an emphasis by the Obama Administration towards support for education in the fields of science, technology, engineering, and mathematics (STEM fields). The New Moon: Water, Exploration, and Future Habitation, written in 2014 by Arlin Crotts, observed this event and the inclusion of NASA's Lunar Electric Rover in the First inauguration of Barack Obama reflected an emphasis on the importance of science education.

== Events ==
=== 2009 White House Astronomy Night ===
President Obama speaks at the first White House Astronomy Night (October 7, 2009)

The first White House Astronomy Night was held on the South Lawn on October 7, 2009. This first event coincided with the International Year of Astronomy. Science Advisor to the President John Holdren stood next to President Obama as the president made a speech wherein he emphasized the values of science education and how crucial it was to society to increase the interest of youth towards studying science. This was an attempt by the White House to increase motivation for children to enter science, technology, engineering, and mathematics (STEM) fields. Only optical telescopes were used to peer at the heavens during the events. Over twenty such telescopes were placed on the South Lawn of the White House in addition to displays of Moon rocks, meteorites, and presentations of the Solar System.

In addition the Obama family, in attendance at the event was NASA astronaut Sally Ride, the first female American to travel to space in 1983. Ride wore her flight jacket and answered questions from children about the Solar System.

Caroline Moore and Lucas Bolyard discuss their interest in the field at the first White House Astronomy Night (October 7, 2009)

Amateur astronomers Caroline Moore and Lucas Bolyard attended the event. Both Moore and Bolyard had previously made noteworthy discoveries in astronomy. New York high school student Moore contributed to the discovery of Supernova 2008ha in 2008, becoming the youngest individual to identify a supernova.

While a high school student in his second-year at a school in West Virginia in 2009, Bolyard found a rotating radio transient, a form of neutron star. Bolyard accomplished this through analysis of observations while a member of the Pulsar Search Collaboratory, an initiative aimed at allowing youth access to the Robert C. Byrd Green Bank Telescope through joint cooperation between West Virginia University and the National Radio Astronomy Observatory.

=== National Mall events ===
Astronaut Sally Ride takes questions at the 2009 White House Astronomy Night

Executive Office of the President department — the Office of Science and Technology Policy, hosted the next Astronomy Night on July 15, 2010. This time the event took place at the National Mall. Hofstra University helped organize the event which was open to the public.

The event was held on the National Mall the next year on July 9, 2011. The Smithsonian National Air and Space Museum assisted through opening its Public Observatory and outer landing area to the public. Hofstra University sponsored the event, and presented both live events and space observation through telescopes. Hofstra University program coordinator of astronomy public outreach, professor Donald Lubowich, helped organize the event. Lubowich commented: "Bringing Hofstra's program to the National Mall gives us a very special opportunity to encourage children to pursue their interest and science and promote public understanding of science. Gazing at the rings of Saturn or the Moon's craters and mountains captures the imagination, no matter how old you are." The 2011 event included assistance from the Northern Virginia Astronomy Club, in addition to attendance from organizations including: the American Astronomical Society, the James Webb Space Telescope, the NASA Goddard Space Flight Center, the National Radio Astronomy Observatory, and the Franklin Institute Science Museum.

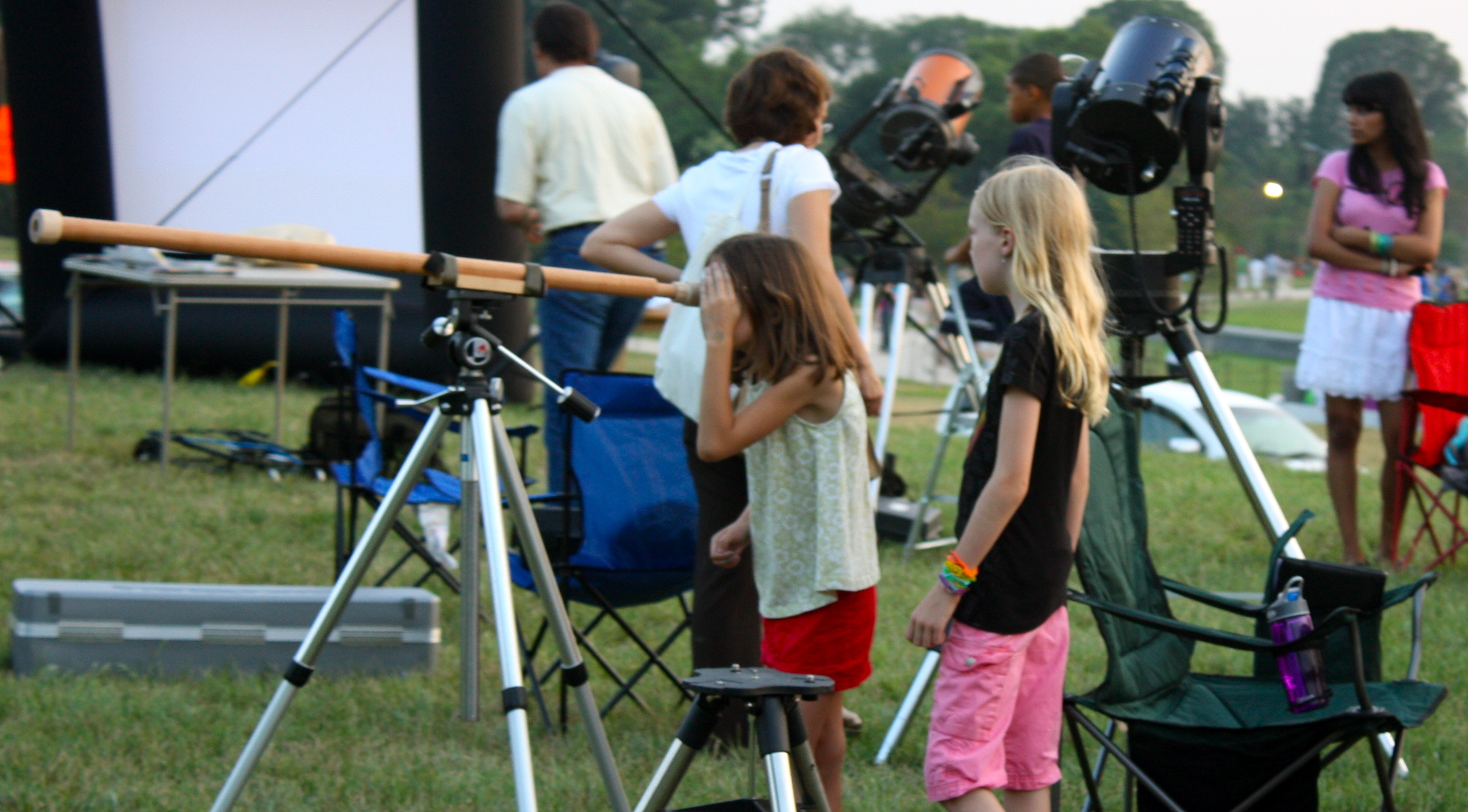
Children gazing through a replica of Galileo's telescope at the 2010 event held on the National Mall

April 28, 2012, was the third time the event was held on the National Mall. It was organized with help from Hofstra University, in addition to local astronomy clubs. Organizations represented included: the National Science Foundation, Astronomy Magazine, the American Astronomical Society, the Astronomical Society of the Pacific, International Dark-Sky Association, the Harvard-Smithsonian Center for Astrophysics, Space Telescope Science Institute, and the National Optical Astronomy Observatory.

The fourth National Mall event was held on June 14, 2013. Lubowich arranged the event, and it featured guided tours of the United States Capitol Building, in addition to complementary tours at local museums. The director of the Astrophysics Division at NASA, Dr. Paul Hertz, attended to talk about astronomy at his institution and to provide information to youth about his field of expertise.

In 2014 approximately 7,000 individuals participated in the Astronomy Night on the National Mall. Lubowich attended and organized the night which was held June 6, 2014. Montgomery College Astronomical Observatory sent staff to man a table and answer questions.

Lubowich helped arrange an event on the National Mall on June 19, 2015. Astronomy Magazine came and staff passed out hand-outs, and groups in attendance to support the event included: the American Geophysical Union, the International Dark-Sky Association, the Carnegie Institution, and Georgetown University. It featured a portable blow-up dome with a lit planetarium for viewing. Instructors dressed as historical figures from astronomy including: Caroline Herschel, Tycho Brahe, and Johannes Kepler to educate children about the field.

=== 2015 White House Astronomy Night ===
President Obama speaks at the 2015 White House Astronomy Night

On August 21, 2015, the White House announced that the Astronomy Night that year would take place on the South Lawn of the White House on October 19. Students, teachers, and professionals from the fields of astronomy and the private sector of space exploration were invited to attend. One notable participant was Ahmed Mohamed, a Texas high school student who assembled a makeshift clock at home, brought it to school, and was detained and questioned by police after a teacher thought it resembled a bomb. In the wake of subsequent publicity, President Obama tweeted an invitation to Mohamed to visit the White House with his "cool clock". Obama Administration staff urged him to attend Astronomy Night, with Press Secretary Josh Earnest calling the incident a "teachable moment" and Science Advisor John Holdren extending a formal invitation.

That night, the President gave a speech to the Astronomy Night audience, saying: "We have to watch for and cultivate and encourage those glimmers of curiosity and possibility, not suppress them, not squelch them." Afterwards, the President talked with Mohamed briefly and hugged him. Obama looked through a telescope and participated in a call with the crew of the International Space Station. Children who attended the event inspected meteorites, specimens from Mars and Moon rocks. It was mentioned that the Transiting Exoplanet Survey Satellite was supported by the President along with the James Webb Space Telescope, in a White House Fact Sheet about the 2015 White House Astronomy night.

Bill Nye, along with MythBusters co-hosts Jamie Hyneman and Adam Savage, discuss space exploration with Deputy Administrator of NASA Dava Newman at the 2015 White House Astronomy Night.

Sofy Alvarez-Bareiro, a high school student from Brooklyn, New York, assisted the President in gazing at the Moon through a telescope. She explained to the President that craters on the Moon were caused by impacts from space materials. The Russellville, Alabama-based group Russellville City Schools Engineering Rocket Team attended the event and were personally recognized by President Obama. Team members Chelsea Suddith, Katie Burns, Niles Butts, Andrew Heath, Cristian Ruiz, Cady Studdard and Evan Swinney were requested by the President to stand at the event and speak to the crowd about the rocketry accomplishments, which included achieving victory among contestants at the 2015 International Rocketry Challenge at the Paris Air Show. The students were able to meet celebrities who attended the event, including Bill Nye, and MythBusters co-hosts Jamie Hyneman and Adam Savage.

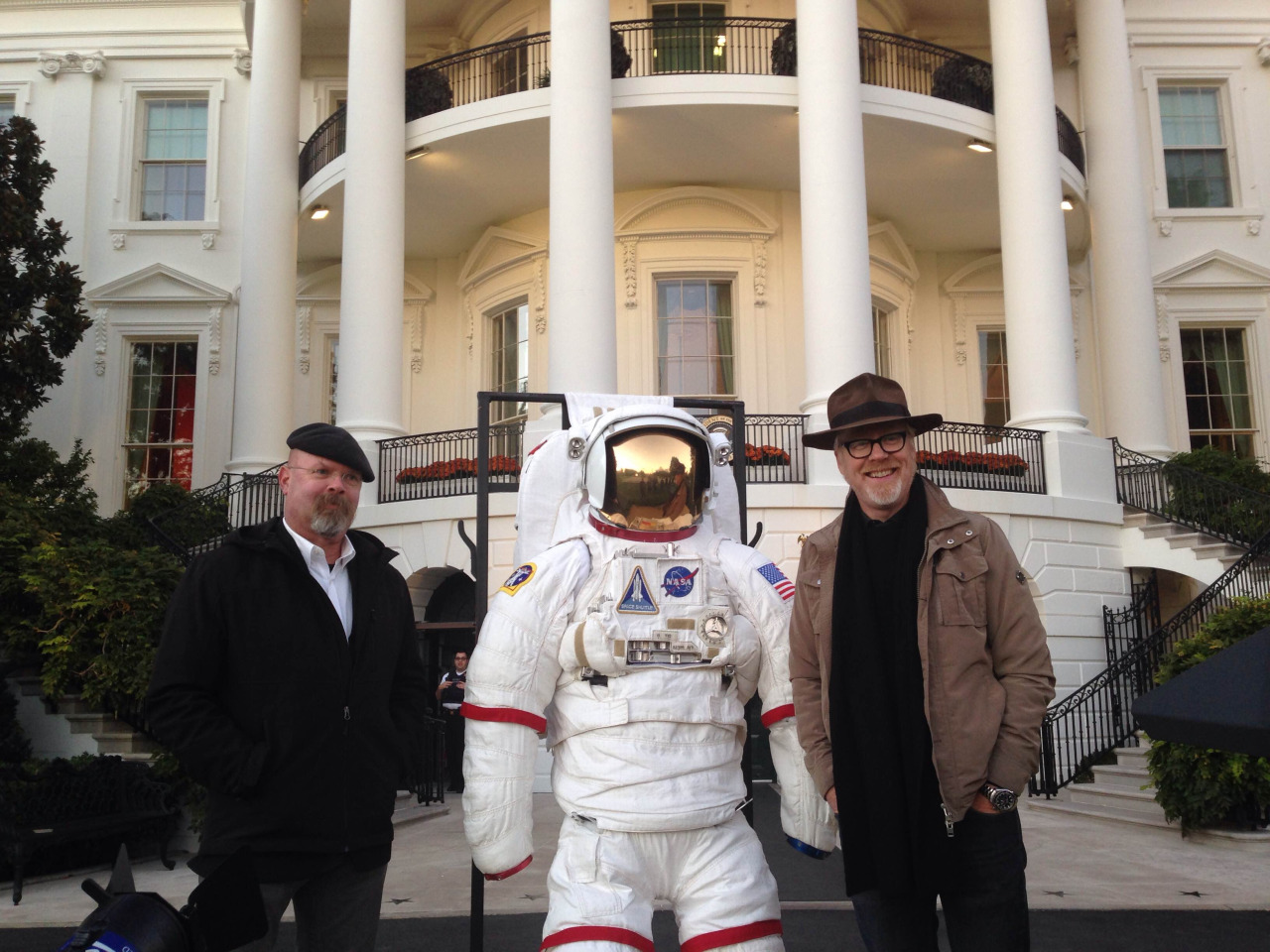
MythBusters co-hosts Jamie Hyneman and Adam Savage attended the 2015 White House Astronomy Night.

Indian-American student Pranav Sivakumar was praised by the President in his speech at the event. President Obama recounted how Sivakumar was first intrigued by scientists at six years old, after reading about famous researchers in an encyclopedia. His parents cultivated his quest for knowledge by bringing him to lectures on astrophysics; he went on to become a two-time finalist at the Google Science Fair. Obama cited Sivakumar as an example of the outstanding students that attended the stargazing event at the White House.

Florida student Kiera Wilmot attended the event; she gained notice in the press two years prior, after being arrested and charged with a felony when her science project made a loud popping noise. At the time an honors high school student participating in a science project in Polk County, Florida, at Bartow High School, Wilmot combined aluminum foil and toilet-bowl cleaner inside of a bottle. After the bottle made a loud popping noise, Wilmot was removed from the class, placed in handcuffs, sent to a juvenile detention facility and faced charges of obtaining and utilizing a destructive device. Administration officials at her school explained their reactions to her science project by stating they had a zero tolerance practice in place against undesirable behaviors or possession of items; charges against her were dropped and she went back to the high school. At the time of her attendance at the White House Astronomy Night, Wilmot was a student at Florida Polytechnic University with a focus in mechanical engineering.

== Commentary ==
The 2012 book Rising Above the Gathering Storm by the National Academies of Sciences, Engineering, and Medicine cited the fact that the Obama Administration hosted the first White House Astronomy Night, as a reflection of the President's support for education in the STEM fields. The 2014 book The New Moon: Water, Exploration, and Future Habitation by Arlin Crotts discussed the appreciation of the importance of science education by the Obama Administration, citing the White House Astronomy Night and the inclusion of NASA's Lunar Electric Rover in the First inauguration of Barack Obama as key examples. Sally Ride: America's First Woman in Space, a 2015 biography of the astronaut by Lynn Sherr, discussed Ride's attendance at the 2009 White House Astronomy Night and commented that she enjoyed speaking with youngsters about the possibility of humans visiting Mars in the future.

== See also ==
- Astronomy Day
- National Astronomy Week
- National Dark-Sky Week
- Science and technology in the United States
- Science policy of the United States
- Science, Technology, Society and Environment Education
- Science outreach
