= National Astronomy Week =

National Astronomy Week (NAW)
- Status: Active
- Genre: Astronomy-related events and competitions
- Frequency: As per notable events; Duration: 1 Week
- Country: United Kingdom
- Years active: 39
- Inaugurated: 1981
- Previous event: 2025
- Participants: Observed by Astronomers and astronomy enthusiasts
- Website: astronomyweek.org.uk

National Astronomy Week (NAW) is an event held every few years in the United Kingdom to promote public awareness of astronomy by celebrating notable astronomical events. The last NAW, "Chasing The Planets" was run during the week of 1–9 February 2025.

== Activities ==
During the week, astronomy societies, planetaria, schools, universities and other organisations from all over the UK organise events to promote interest in, and knowledge of, astronomy. The organisers promote the week using extensive contacts with the media and all the major UK astronomical organisations, many of whom provide funding. Events range from talks, visits and in particular the opportunity for children and adults alike to observe the sky through a range of equipment. Increasing use is being made of "virtual" events with talks and observations being streamed.

=== History ===
The need for National Astronomy Week (NAW) was first defined in the late 1970s. A group of both professional and amateur astronomers as well as teachers and educators was formed to define and run the first ever event. NAW was proposed in 1979 and a steering committee was set up in 1980. Since then a total of eight events have run as listed below.

Timeline of NAW events
Sr.	Year	Notes	Reference
1	1981	To commemorate the 200th anniversary of the discovery of Uranus.	
2	1985	Return of Halley’s Comet.	
3	1990	To commemorate the centenary of the British Astronomical Association.	
4	1996	To commemorate the 150th anniversary of the discovery of Neptune.	
5	2003	To coincide with arguably the closest approach of Mars for 60,000 years.	
6	2009	To celebrate the 400th anniversary of Thomas Harriot's reputed first use of the telescope for astronomical purposes. It ran during the International Year of Astronomy in 2009 as a major event organised by the steering committee at Syon House	
7	2014	To celebrate Jupiter attaining its highest possible point in the northern-hemisphere night skies for 12 years.	
8	2020	To celebrate the close approach of Mars - the closest until 2035. Due to the COVID-19 pandemic this had to be run as a "virtual" week.	
9	2025	Chasing the Moon and a parade of planets	

=== 2025 ===
The ninth National Astronomy Week, "Chasing the Moon," will take place from 1 to 9 February 2025. The prime focus of this year's event will be following the Moon across the night sky and observing a parade of planets.

Throughout the week, observers will have the chance to track the Moon's changing appearance as it moves through different phases and interacts with planets along its path. Highlights will include close encounters with bright stars and planets, with Mars, Jupiter, Saturn, and Venus all positioned for excellent naked-eye observation (Neptune and Uranus will also be visible with optical aid).

A mix of in-person events and online experiences will allow participants across the UK—and beyond—to take part, whether through public observing sessions, live-streamed telescope views, or expert talks from leading astronomers. In case of poor weather, virtual observations will ensure that everyone can still witness these celestial wonders, with feeds from observatories and astronomers worldwide.

To encourage as many people as possible to participate in practical stargazing sessions and astronomy events, the National Astronomy Week team will collaborate with Go Stargazing, an organisation that supports grassroots astronomy groups across the UK. Their website will be used to promote hundreds events taking place during the week, helping connect astronomy enthusiasts from all backgrounds with nearby stargazing locations.

National Astronomy Week will also coincide with National Storytelling Week. Many traditional stories tell tales of the stars and Moon, and the night sky is full of constellations with their own myths and legends. Storytelling sessions, astronomy talks on the mythology of the sky, and special events blending science with folklore will take place throughout the week.

=== 2020 ===
The eighth event, named "Mars Encounter", ran from 14 to 22 November 2020. Mars made a very close approach to Earth, and will not be as close again until 2035. Saturn and Jupiter were in an excellent position as they approached the Great Conjunction which took place the following month. Initially the week was planned to be a conventional series of viewing sessions and talks across the UK. But the arrival of the coronavirus pandemic meant that conventional events could not be run, so instead the week was run "virtually" and involved streaming live events and observation sessions direct to homes. Most of the talks and observation sessions were run by the National Astronomy Week organising team, and these events were all recorded and can still be viewed. An index to the recordings can be found on the NAW website or they can be viewed via the NAW YouTube Channel. The NAW Team Events can be seen by clicking NAW Events in the menu; talks and events run by other societies and science centres are under "Events". In the event the week was not a good one for observing, with cloud for much of the week. Fortunately, the use of streaming meant observations could take place from wherever had clear skies, for example Northumberland and Cyprus.

=== 2014 ===
The seventh event, named "Target Jupiter", ran from 1–8 March 2014. Jupiter was at a very high position in the sky, the best that will be achieved for many years. Observing conditions were generally well above average. More than 200 events were run across the UK. Participating organisations included astronomy societies, schools, universities, and Scouts/Guides. The details of the 2014 NAW are still available on the National Astronomy Week website. The event was widely announced in the UK, for example in Astronomy & Geophysics magazine, and there is also information on the NAW Twitter page and on Facebook. A special event radio station, call sign GB1NAW, transmitted from Lockyer Technology Centre during National Astronomy Week (and the week preceding), between 7.060 MHz and 7.200 MHz LSB (Lower Side Band) during daylight hours and between 3.600 MHz and 3.800 MHz LSB after dusk.

== Sponsorship and funding ==
National Astronomy Week is sponsored (and funded) by a number of UK astronomy societies and actively supported by the Royal Astronomical Society. Other funds are sometimes obtained from science organisations in the UK, including the Science & Technology Facilities Council.

== See also ==
- Astronomy Day
- 100 Hours of Astronomy (100HA)
- Earth Hour
- Earth Day
- National Dark-Sky Week (NDSW)
- White House Astronomy Night
