= The World At Night =

The World at Night (TWAN)
- Website type: Photography website
- Owner: Astronomers Without Borders (AWB)
- Creators: Babak A. Tafreshi; Mike Simmons
- Website: twanight.org
- Commercial: No
- Launched: Fall 2007

The World At Night (TWAN) is an international project to produce and present a collection of high-quality photos, videos, and virtual reality (VR) images of the night sky taken at various natural, cultural, and historic locations worldwide.

Based on the peacemaking slogan of "One People, One Sky", TWAN aims to demonstrate that humanity is one family when considered under the roof of the night sky. According to its website, "TWAN is a bridge between art, humanity, and science. The eternally peaceful sky looks the same above all the landmarks and symbols of different nations and regions, attesting to the truly unified nature of Earth as a planet rather than an amalgam of human-designated territories."

== Access ==
This imagery is available for viewing on the TWAN website, through media contributions and presentations and exhibits in various countries. TWAN events have been organized in countries such as United States, Brazil, Chile, France, Germany, Italy, Turkey, Algeria, Iran, India, Thailand, South Korea, South Africa, and Australia. The images are also presented in the form of publications and TWAN books and DVDs are planned for release in 2010.

== Management ==
About 30 night sky photographers from around the world participate in TWAN. They travel globally and photograph scenes that tell how the familiar sky appears the same from country to country and continent to continent.

The TWAN project is coordinated by Astronomers Without Borders (AWB). According to its website, "TWAN has brought together photographers, astronomers and organizations worldwide to create a new international team that fulfills its primary goal of bringing to the public a new way of seeing the beauty of nights sky and wonders of our planet, portraying Earth’s people as one family and our world as a living planet we must care for."

In addition to the main photo and video galleries on the TWAN website, there are specific galleries for UNESCO World Heritage Sites, and images that have appeared on NASA's Astronomy Picture of the Day (APOD) website. TWAN also has a "Guest Gallery" where people can submit their own night-sky images. This furthers the reach and variety of the image collection, which includes more than 1500 photos, videos, and VR imagery. Sites from about 50 countries are represented, spanning every continent.

The photographic imagery on the TWAN website is copyrighted.

A TWAN photo displays a moonlit winter night in Alborz Mountains of Iran.

TWAN has been designated by UNESCO and the International Astronomical Union (IAU) as a Special Project of the International Year of Astronomy 2009 (IYA2009). A TWAN exhibition accompanied the opening ceremony of IYA2009 in the UNESCO headquarters in Paris.

== Examples of photos ==
TWAN photos that have been NASA's Astronomy Pictures of the Day include the following:

- NASA Astronomy Picture of the Day: A True Image from False Kiva (29 September 2008)
- NASA Astronomy Picture of the Day: A Starry Night in Brazil (9 May 2009)
- NASA Astronomy Picture of the Day: Mars and Orion Over Monument Valley (25 December 2007)
- NASA Astronomy Picture of the Day: 6 Minutes 42 Seconds (30 July 2009)
- NASA Astronomy Picture of the Day: The Big Picture (11 April 2009)
- NASA Astronomy Picture of the Day: Circle 'round the Moon (13 February 2009)
- NASA Astronomy Picture of the Day: Orion Dawn Over Mount Nemrut (16 December 2008)
- NASA Astronomy Picture of the Day: Mauna Kea Milky Way Panorama (19 February 2009)
- NASA Astronomy Picture of the Day: Solstice Moonrise, Cape Sounion (20 June 2008)
- NASA Astronomy Picture of the Day: Alborz Mountain Milky Way (3 May 2008)
- NASA Astronomy Picture of the Day: Sky Delights Over Sweden (15 April 2008)
