= International Dark Sky Week =

Annual international event in April

- Status: Active
- Genre: Astronomy-related events and competitions
- Frequency: Week of the new moon in April
- Location: Worldwide
- Inaugurated: 2003
- Founder: Jennifer Barlow
- Next event: April 2027
- Website: darksky.org/what-we-do/events/dark-sky-week/

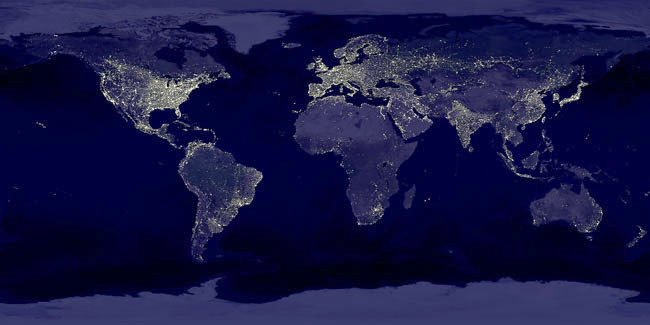
Composite image of worldwide light pollution at night

International Dark Sky Week (formerly the National Dark Sky Week) is held during the week of the new moon in April, when people worldwide may turn off their lights to observe the beauty of the night sky without light pollution. This event was founded in 2003 by high school student Jennifer Barlow of Midlothian, Virginia. It has been endorsed by the International Dark-Sky Association, the American Astronomical Society, the Astronomical League, and Sky & Telescope.

== Goal ==
The goals of the event are to:

- Temporarily reduce light pollution and raise awareness about its effects on the night sky,
- Encourage the use of better lighting systems that direct light downward instead of into the sky, and
- Promote the study of astronomy.

This event always occurs in April, during the week of the new moon so that the sky can be as dark as possible for optimum viewing conditions.

Jennifer Barlow states, "The night sky is a gift of such tremendous beauty that should not be hidden under a blanket of wasted light. It should be visible so that future generations do not lose touch with the wonder of our universe." Barlow explains, "It is my wish that people see the night sky in all of its glory, without excess light in the sky as our ancestors saw it hundreds of years ago."

== Participation ==
Willing participants in this project turn off all unnecessary lighting indoors and outdoors sources in order to reduce light pollution of the night sky.

The International Dark-Sky Association encourages light users to take precautions against outdoor light pollution by:

- Using outdoor light only when needed
- Confine light to specific areas
- Be aware that lights need only be as bright as it is necessary
- Reducing the amount of blue light emissions used
- Use of lighting that faces downward, in order to avoid over illumination, called fully shielded fixtures

== Types of light pollution ==
Light pollution is a broad term used to define excess artificial light that brightens the night sky. Types of light pollution which include:

- Skyglow, a hazy glow produced by the reflection water molecules in the air that encompasses cities which prevent the night sky to be fully seen.
- Light trespass is a condition in which light is oriented into areas in which it is not needed. A common example is street lighting projecting in all directions including the sky which creates a hazy reflection upon the night sky, making it difficult for star observation.
- Over-illumination is the excess supply of light used beyond what is necessary for safety and efficiency.
- Light clutter which refers to the common organizational groupings of lights in cities and roadways.
- Glare is an impeding bright light which cause temporary impairments to human sight. There are three classifications of glare, blinding glare, disability glare and discomfort glare.

== Implications of light pollution ==
Light pollution is the adverse effects of artificial light.

Affected parties of light pollution include:

Astronomers:

By increasing the number of participants, the quality of viewing the sky and stars will be temporarily improved. This is of benefit to astronomers who are faced with light pollution issues such as light trespass and skyglow.

Nocturnal wildlife:

Several animal species have been documented to be affected by light pollution. The glare of street lights causes distraction to nocturnal birds in flight, leading to bird crashes into sky scrapers and buildings. The use of light may also cause birds to reproduce or migrate too early. The feeding behavior of insects, bats, sea turtles, fish, and reptiles reflect alterations by artificial light. Sea turtles mistake the glow of electric lights for the shimmer of the ocean, leading them to flock outside of their nest into hazardous areas.

Human circadian rhythm and sleep patterns:

Exposure to light during traditional sleeping hours are documented to cause disruptions in the circadian rhythm that regulate human sleep cycles. Biologists have noted a decrease in the amount of melatonin, a natural hormone that regulates the Circadian rhythm, in humans that are exposed to light pollution of the night sky. In order to prevent major impact, biologists suggest increasing the amount of natural light exposure during the day and decreasing the amount of electrical light consumed at night.

Growth patterns of plants and trees:

The growing pattern of trees have been disrupted and less adjusted to seasonal changes in weather and light exposure.

Waste of economic resources:

Leaving lights on that are not in use can lead to the waste of economic cost expenditures. Conservation and efficiency is necessary for environmental responsibility. The invention of LED lights, dimmers, motion sensors and times have reduced the amount of energy used.

== Legislation ==
Currently, there are no nationwide standards regarding light pollution. However, select cities across North America are taking initiative to facilitate dark sky cities in order to reduce light pollution and view the night sky within city limits.

== Event dates ==
Timeline of Dark Sky Week events
Sr.	Year	Week	New moon (UTC)	Notes	Reference
1	2003		1 April		
2	2004		19 April		
3	2005		8 April		
4	2006		27 April		
5	2007		17 April		
6	2008		6 April	In 2008, the organizers coordinated the week with Earth Hour.	
7	2009	April 20–26	25 April	International Year of Astronomy (IYA 2009); In 2009, the United States Dark Sky Week becomes International Dark Sky Week	
8	2010		13–14 April		
9	2011		3 April	The world's first International Dark Sky City was founded in Flagstaff, AZ	
10	2012		21 April		
11	2013		10 April		
12	2014	April 20–26	29 April		
13	2015	April 13–18	18 April	International Year of Light and Light-based Technologies (IYL 2015)	
14	2016	April 4-10	7 April		
15	2017	April 22-28	26 April	The first day (April 22) corresponded with Earth Day.	
16	2018		16 April		
17	2019	March 31- April 7	5 April		
18	2020	April 19-26	22 April		
19	2021	April 5-12	12 April		
20	2022	April 22-30	1 April, 30 April		
21	2023	April 17-23	20 April		
22	2024	April 2-8	8 April	A total solar eclipse took place on 8 April.	
23	2025	April 21-28	27 April		
24	2026	April 13-20	17 April		
25	2027	April 5-11	7 April		

indicates upcoming event
indicates ongoing event

== See also ==
- Dark-sky movement
- Earth Hour
- National Astronomy Week
- Noctcaelador
- White House Astronomy Night
- Light pollution
- Bortle scale
