= Global Hands-On Universe =

Educational astronomical program

Global Hands-On Universe (GHOU) is an educational program that enables students to investigate the Universe while applying tools and concepts from science, math, and technology. Using the Internet, GHOU participants request observations from an automated telescope, download images from an image archive, and analyze them with the help of image processing software.

== History ==
The Galileo Teacher Training Program (GTTP) was started by the International Astronomical Union (IAU) in 2009. One important part of GTTP is the Global Hands-On Universe (GHOU).

Different regions of the world participate in this program. In Asia, China and Japan are involved under the banner of AS-HOU. In Africa, Kenya leads the AF-HOU part of the program, and they have even begun a new project at a high school in Nairobi. This project is focused on astronomy and astrophysics and it aims to teach students how scientific research works.

In Europe, Dr. Ferlet and Dr. A.-L. Melchior lead the Hands-On Universe project. Their work is known as EU-HOU and has received funding from the European Community (EC) between 2004 and 2006 and again from 2008 to 2012. EU-HOU has grown to include 15 European countries, each with their own websites. The educational hub for EU-HOU is based in Paris at the Pierre and Marie Curie University.

EU-HOU has made a lot of free learning resources available on their website, such as the SalsaJ software that allows high school students to work with and analyze astronomical data. Also, there's a network of small radio telescopes that students can use to observe the Milky Way's hydrogen. These telescopes are spread across five European countries (France, Poland, Portugal, Romania, Spain) and can be operated through a web interface available in 17 languages. The project provides teaching resources that have been tested and used in teacher training, high school, and undergraduate levels.

In North America, the US-HOU project is underway, led by the United States with financial support from the National Science Foundation, Department of Defense, and the Department of Energy. In the US, HOU has developed a unique educational program where high school students can ask for their own observations from professional observatories. They can download these observations onto their school computers to study and analyze them. The curriculum created by HOU covers various science and math topics and encourages students to carry out their own astronomical research. HOU has also developed activities for middle school students and resources for places like science museums. The educational center for the US HOU project is the Lawrence Hall of Science at The University of California, Berkeley.

== Teacher training sessions ==
In the context of the European Commission Lifelong Learning Programme 2007–2013, EU-HOU proposes regular European training sessions in France, at Pierre-and-Marie-Curie University in Paris, since 2010. These sessions are published on the Comenius training database (reference numbers: FR-2010-314-003, FR-2011-359-006, FR-2013-408-003).

The main goal of these training sessions is to generate interest in science in the young generation with inquiry-based methods. Active methods based e.g. on kinesthesia (Proprioception) have been recently introduced to introduce modeling concepts. The training is intended to enhance the basic competencies of teachers and develop higher-level skills and expertise, primarily in Information and communication technologies in education (ICT), maths and physics areas.

These sessions are financed through European Commission Comenius national Agencies (Comenius programme). Information related to scheduled training sessions is posted on the EU-HOU website and its news.

A dedicated forum in English has been opened to favour feedback from trained teachers and interaction with a wider educator and researcher community.

== See also ==
- Global Science Opera
- List of astronomical societies
