= Lunar Mission One =

Proposed crowdfunded robotic mission to the Moon

Lunar Mission One was a proposed international, crowdfunded, robotic mission to the Moon, led by Lunar Missions Limited in England. They did not obtain $1 billion funding for research, development and launch of a spacecraft, meant to be launched in 2024. The Lunar Mission One programme closed down due to tax issues.

== Overview ==
The mission aimed to send a lunar lander to the Moon in 2024. The lander would drill below the surface of the Lunar South Pole to a depth of up to 100m, in the hope of accessing lunar rock up to 4.5 billion years old. The lunar lander would contain scientific instruments to explore the science and geology behind the origins of the Moon and the Solar System.

After drilling, the module would place a time capsule into the borehole. This time capsule would contain a public archive, with a record of Earth's biosphere and a history of human civilization, and a private archive consisting of millions of digital memory boxes. Consumers would be able to purchase digital memory boxes, and fill them with digital data such as photos or videos. They would also be able to store their DNA via a strand of hair. Lunar Missions Limited set the total cost of the mission at £500 million, aiming to raise these funds through global sales of digital memory boxes.

Funding for the initial legal fees was raised on the international crowd-funding platform, Kickstarter. The fundraising was successfully completed on 17 December 2014, with £672,447 ($1,017,000 approx.) being pledged, exceeding the minimum target of £600,000 ($900,000 approx.).

== Management ==
The Lunar Mission One programme closed down due to VAT tax issues.

Lunar Mission One was overseen by the Lunar Missions Trust, which was also responsible for the education programme to be developed around Lunar Mission One, primarily focusing on STEM subjects. The Trust was chaired by Sir Graeme Davies and trustees included Monica Grady and David Iron. The Trust closed in May 2023.

Lunar Missions Limited was a company chaired by Ian Taylor, former UK Minister for Science and Technology. Directors of the company included David Iron and Angela Lamont. The technical advisor for the first stage of the project was RAL Space. The Trust announced its intent to liquidate Lunar Missions Ltd in 2019.
