= NASA INSPIRE =

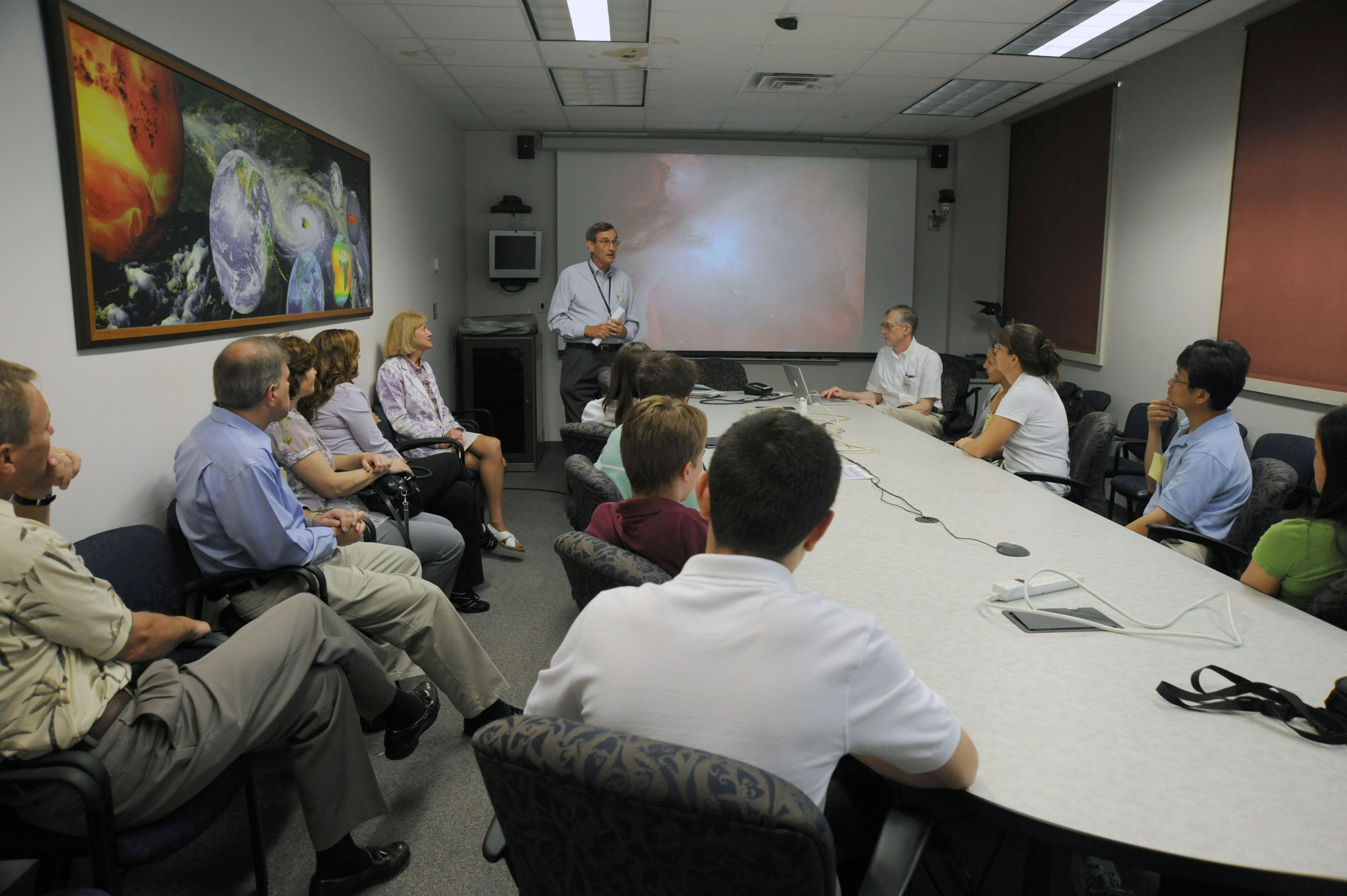
Dr. Robert Gabrys presents to teachers and interns in the INSPIRE program

NASA INSPIRE (Interdisciplinary National Science Project Incorporating Research and Education Experience) was a NASA educational program that operated between 2008 and 2013. It was a year-round project designed for students in ninth to 12th grade interested in science, technology, engineering and mathematics (STEM) topics and careers.

Students mostly participated in INSPIRE through an online learning community, and the program provided activities, projects and challenges, which were completed individually or with other INSPIRE students and/or NASA personnel. During the 2012–13 school year, there were 305 active students in INSPIRE. Those accepted into the program could participate in group research and design competitions.

In this Online Community, students discussed STEM topics with other participants, INSPIRE alumnae who were in college, and NASA personnel, participated in weekly group chats with NASA scientists and engineers, and earned points for completing STEM activities. The points were a factor in selections for additional activities and in determining eligibility of the participants to apply for summer opportunities; in later years, these opportunities ranged from virtual experiences to a multi-day program at Kennedy Space Center.
