= International Year of Astronomy =

2009 UN theme year

The IYA2009 logo

International Year of Astronomy commemorative coin

The International Year of Astronomy (IYA2009) was a year-long celebration of astronomy that took place in 2009 to coincide with the 400th anniversary of the first recorded astronomical observations with a telescope by Galileo Galilei and the publication of Johannes Kepler's Astronomia nova in the 17th century. The Year was declared by the 62nd General Assembly of the United Nations. A global scheme, laid out by the International Astronomical Union (IAU), was also endorsed by UNESCO, the UN body responsible for educational, scientific, and cultural matters.

The IAU coordinated the International Year of Astronomy in 2009. This initiative was an opportunity for the citizens of Earth to gain a deeper insight into astronomy's role in enriching all human cultures. Moreover, served as a platform for informing the public about the latest astronomical discoveries while emphasizing the essential role of astronomy in science education. IYA2009 was sponsored by Celestron and Thales Alenia Space.

== Significance of 1609 ==
On 25 September 1608, Hans Lippershey, a spectacle-maker from Middelburg, traveled to The Hague, the then capital of the Netherlands, to demonstrate to the Dutch government a new device he was trying to patent: a telescope. Although Hans was not awarded the patent, Galileo heard of this story and decided to use the "Dutch perspective glass" and point it towards the heavens.

In 1609, Galileo Galilei first turned one of his telescopes to the night sky and made astounding discoveries that changed mankind's conception of the world: mountains and craters on the Moon, a plethora of stars invisible to the naked eye, and moons around Jupiter. Astronomical observatories around the world promised to reveal how planets and stars are formed, how galaxies assemble and evolve, and what the structure and shape of our Universe actually are. In the same year, Johannes Kepler published his work Astronomia nova, in which he described the fundamental laws of planetary motions.

However Galileo was not the first to observe the Moon through a telescope and make a drawing of it. Thomas Harriot observed and detailed the Moon some months before Galileo. "It's all about publicity. Galileo was extremely good at irritating people and also using creative writing to communicate what he was learning in a way that made people think," says Pamela Gay in an interview with Skepticality in 2009.

== Intended purpose ==
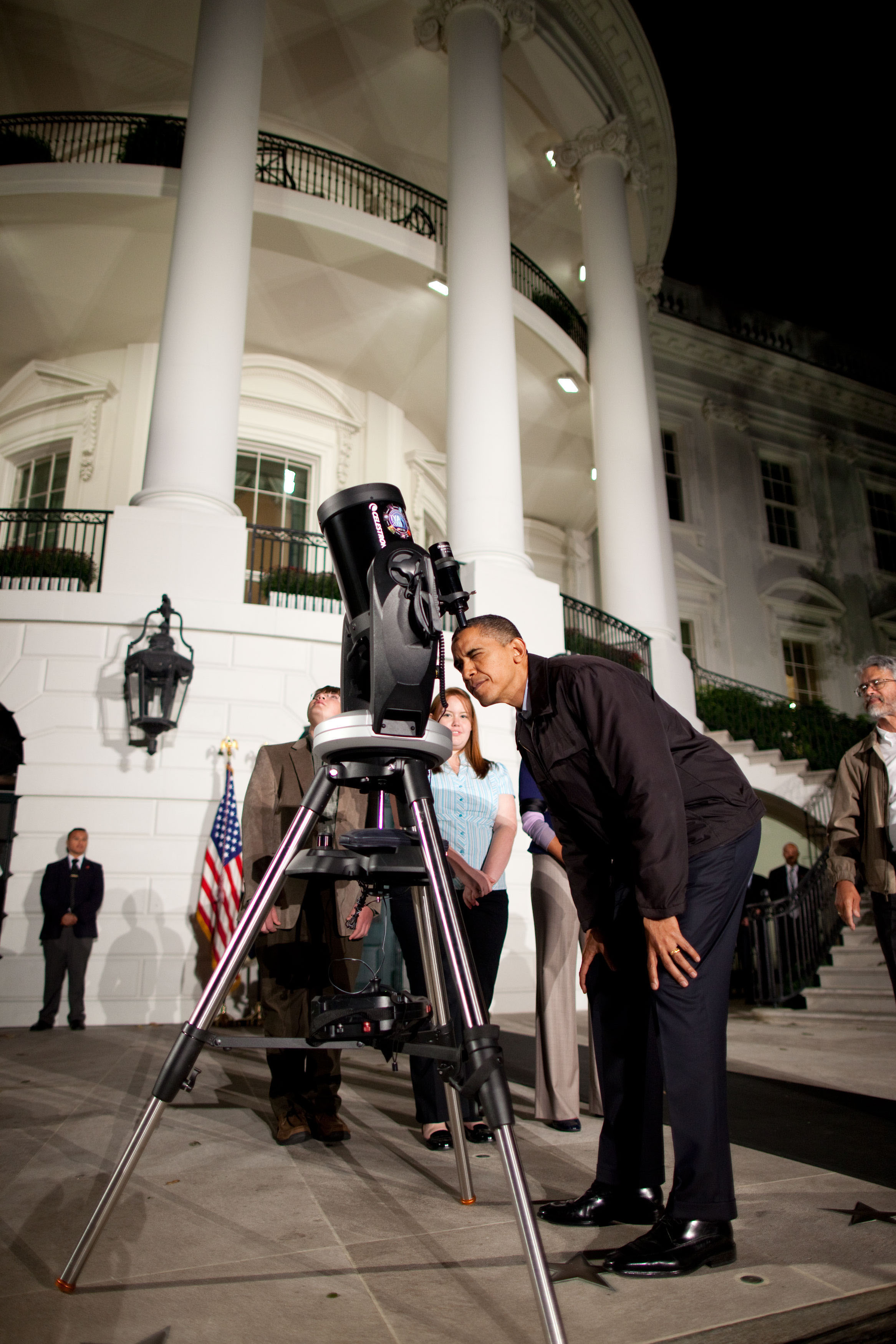
U.S. President Barack Obama views a double star in the constellation Lyra through an 8" Schmidt–Cassegrain telescope during the 2009 White House Astronomy Night.

=== Vision ===
The vision of IYA2009 was to help people rediscover their place in the Universe through the sky, and thereby engage a personal sense of wonder and discovery. IYA2009 activities took place locally, nationally, regionally and internationally. National Nodes were formed in each country to prepare activities for 2009. These nodes established collaborations between professional and amateur astronomers, science centres and science communicators. More than 100 countries were involved, and well over 140 participated eventually. To help coordinate this huge global programme and to provide an important resource for the participating countries, the IAU established a central Secretariat and the IYA2009 website as the principal IYA2009 resource for public, professionals and media alike.

=== Aims ===
Astronomy, perhaps the oldest science in history, has played an important role in most, if not all, cultures over the ages. The International Year of Astronomy 2009 (IYA2009) was intended to be a global celebration of astronomy and its contributions to society and culture, stimulating worldwide interest not only in astronomy, but in science in general, with a particular slant towards young people.

The IYA2009 marked the monumental leap forward that followed Galileo's first use of the telescope for astronomical observations, and portrays astronomy as a peaceful global scientific endeavour that unites amateur and professional astronomers in an international and multicultural family that works together to find answers to some of the most fundamental questions that humankind has ever asked. The aim of the Year was to stimulate worldwide interest in astronomy and science under the central theme "The Universe, Yours to Discover."

Several committees were formed to oversee the vast majority of IYA2009 activities ("sidewalk astronomy" events in planetariums and public observatories), which spun local, regional and national levels. These committees were collaborations between professional and amateur astronomers, science centres and science communicators. Individual countries were undertaking their own initiatives as well as assessing their own national needs, while the IAU acted as the event's coordinator and catalyst on a global scale. The IAU plan was to liaise with, and involve, as many as possible of the ongoing outreach and education efforts throughout the world, including those organized by amateur astronomers.

=== Goals ===
The major goals of IYA2009 were to:

1. Increase scientific awareness;
2. Promote widespread access to new knowledge and observing experiences;
3. Empower astronomical communities in developing countries;
4. Support and improve formal and informal science education;
5. Provide a modern image of science and scientists;
6. Facilitate new networks and strengthen existing ones;
7. Improve the gender-balanced representation of scientists at all levels and promote greater involvement by underrepresented minorities in scientific and engineering careers;
8. Facilitate the preservation and protection of the world's cultural and natural heritage of dark skies in places such as urban oases, national parks and astronomical sites.

As part of the scheme, IYA2009 helped less-well-established organizations from the developing world to become involved with larger organizations and deliver their contributions, linked via a huge global network. This initiative also aimed at reaching economically disadvantaged children across the globe and enhancing their understanding of the world.

== The Secretariat ==
The central hub of the IAU activities for the IYA2009 was the IYA2009 Secretariat. This was established to coordinate activities during the planning, execution and evaluation of the Year. The Secretariat was based in the European Southern Observatory headquarters in the town of Garching near Munich, Germany. The Secretariat was to liaise continuously with the National Nodes, Task Groups, Partners and Organizational Associates, the media and the general public to ensure the progress of the IYA2009 at all levels. The Secretariat and the website were the major coordination and resource centers for all the participating countries, but particularly for those developing countries that lack the national resources to mount major events alone.

== Cornerstone projects ==
The International Year of Astronomy 2009 was supported by eleven Cornerstone projects. These are global programs of activities centered on specific themes and are some of the projects that helped to achieve IYA2009's main goals; whether it is the support and promotion of women in astronomy, the preservation of dark-sky sites around the world or educating and explaining the workings of the Universe to millions, the eleven Cornerstones were the key elements in the success of IYA2009.

=== 100 Hours of Astronomy ===
100 Hours of Astronomy (100HA) is a worldwide astronomy event that ran 2–5 April 2009 and was part of the scheduled global activities of the International Year of Astronomy 2009. The main goal of 100HA was to have as many people throughout the world as possible looking through a telescope just as Galileo did for the first time 400 years ago. The event included special webcasts, students and teachers activities, a schedule of events at science centers, planetariums and science museums as well as 24 hours of sidewalk astronomy, which allowed the opportunity for public observing sessions to as many people as possible.

=== Galileoscope ===
The Galileoscope was a worldwide astronomy event that ran 2–5 April 2009, where the program was to share a personal experience of practical astronomical observations with as many people as possible across the world. It was collaborating with the US IYA2009 National Node to develop a simple, accessible, easy-to-assemble and easy-to-use telescope that can be distributed by the millions. In theory, every participant in an IYA2009 event should be able to take home one of these little telescopes, enabling them to observe with an instrument similar to Galileo's one.

=== Cosmic Diary ===
The Cosmic Diary, a worldwide astronomy event that ran 2–5 April, was not about the science of astronomy, but about what it is like to be an astronomer. Professionals were to blog in texts and images about their life, families, friends, hobbies and interests, as well as their work, latest research findings and the challenges they face. The bloggers represented a vibrant cross-section of working astronomers from all around the world. They wrote in many different languages, from five continents. They have also written feature article "explanations" about their specialist fields, which were highlighted in the website. NASA, ESA and ESO all had sub-blogs as part of the Cosmic Diary Cornerstone.

=== The Portal to the Universe ===
The Portal to the Universe (PTTU) was a worldwide astronomy event that ran 2–5 April 2009, to provide a global, one-stop portal for online astronomy contents, serving as an index, aggregator and a social-networking site for astronomy content providers, laypeople, press, educators, decision-makers and scientists. PTTU was to feature news, image, event and video aggregation; a comprehensive directory of observatories, facilities, astronomical societies, amateur astronomy societies, space artists, science communication universities; and Web 2.0 collaborative tools, such as the ranking of different services according to popularity, to promote interaction within the astronomy multimedia community. In addition, a range of "widgets" (small applications) were to be developed to tap into existing "live data". Modern technology and the standardisation of metadata made it possible to tie all the suppliers of such information together with a single, semi-automatically updating portal.

=== She Is an Astronomer ===
Promoting gender equality and empowering women is one of the United Nations Millennium Development Goals. She Is an Astronomer was a worldwide astronomy event that ran 2–5 April 2009, to promote gender equality in astronomy (and science in general), tackling bias issues by providing a web platform where information and links about gender balance and related resources are collected. The aim of the project was to provide neutral, informative and accessible information to female professional and amateur astronomers, students, and those who are interested in the gender equality problem in science. Providing this information was intended to help increase the interest of young girls in studying and pursuing a career in astronomy. Another objective of the project was to build and maintain an Internet-based, easy-to-handle forum and database, where people regardless of geographical location could read about the subject, ask questions and find answers. There was also to be the option to discuss astronomy-sector-specific problems, such as observing times and family duties.

=== Dark Skies Awareness ===
Dark Skies Awareness was a worldwide astronomy event that ran from 2 to 5 April 2009. The IAU collaborated with the U.S. National Optical Astronomy Observatory (NOAO), representatives of the International Dark-Sky Association (IDA), the Starlight Initiative, and other national and international partners in dark-sky and environmental education on several related themes. The focus was on three main citizen-scientist programs to measure local levels of light pollution. These programs were to take the form of "star hunts" or "star counts", providing people with a fun and direct way to acquire heightened awareness about light pollution through firsthand observations of the night sky. Together, the three programs were to cover the entire International Year of Astronomy 2009, namely GLOBE at Night (in March), the Great World Wide Star Count (in October) and How Many Stars (January, February, April through September, November and December).

UNESCO and the IAU were working together to implement a research and education collaboration as part of UNESCO's thematic initiative, Astronomy and World Heritage as a worldwide astronomy event that also ran 2–5 April 2009. The main objective was to establish a link between science and culture on the basis of research aimed at acknowledging the cultural and scientific values of properties connected with astronomy. This programme provides an opportunity to identify properties related to astronomy located around the world, to preserve their memory and save them from progressive deterioration. Support from the international community is needed to implement this activity and to promote the recognition of astronomical knowledge through the nomination of sites that celebrate important achievements in science.

=== Galileo Teacher Training Program ===
The Galileo Teacher Training Program (GTTP): the International Year of Astronomy 2009 provided an opportunity to engage the formal education community in the excitement of astronomical discovery as a vehicle for improving the teaching of science in classrooms around the world. To help training teachers in effective astronomy communication and to sustain the legacy of IYA2009, the IAU – in collaboration with the National Nodes and leaders in the field such as the Global Hands-On Universe project, the US National Optical Astronomy Observatory and the Astronomical Society of the Pacific – embarked on a unique global effort to empower teachers by developing the Galileo Teacher Training Program (GTTP).

The GTTP goal was to create a worldwide network of certified "Galileo Ambassadors" by 2012. These Ambassadors were to train "Galileo Master Teachers" in the effective use and transfer of astronomy education tools and resources into classroom science curricula. The Galileo Teachers were to be equipped to train other teachers in these methodologies, leveraging the work begun during IYA2009 in classrooms everywhere. Through workshops, online training tools and basic education kits, the products and techniques developed by this program could be adapted to reach locations with few resources of their own, as well as computer-connected areas that could take advantage of access to robotic optical and radio telescopes, webcams, astronomy exercises, cross-disciplinary resources, image processing and digital universes (web and desktop planetariums). Among GTTP partners, the Global Hands-On Universe project was a leader.

=== Universe Awareness ===
Universe Awareness (UNAWE) was a worldwide astronomy event that also ran during 2–5 April 2009, as an international program to introduce very young children in under-privileged environments to the scale and beauty of the Universe. Universe Awareness noted the multicultural origins of modern astronomy in an effort to broaden children's minds, awaken their curiosity in science and stimulate global citizenship and tolerance. Using the sky and children's natural fascination with it as common ground, UNAWE was to create an international awareness of their place in the Universe and their place on Earth.

=== From Earth to the Universe ===
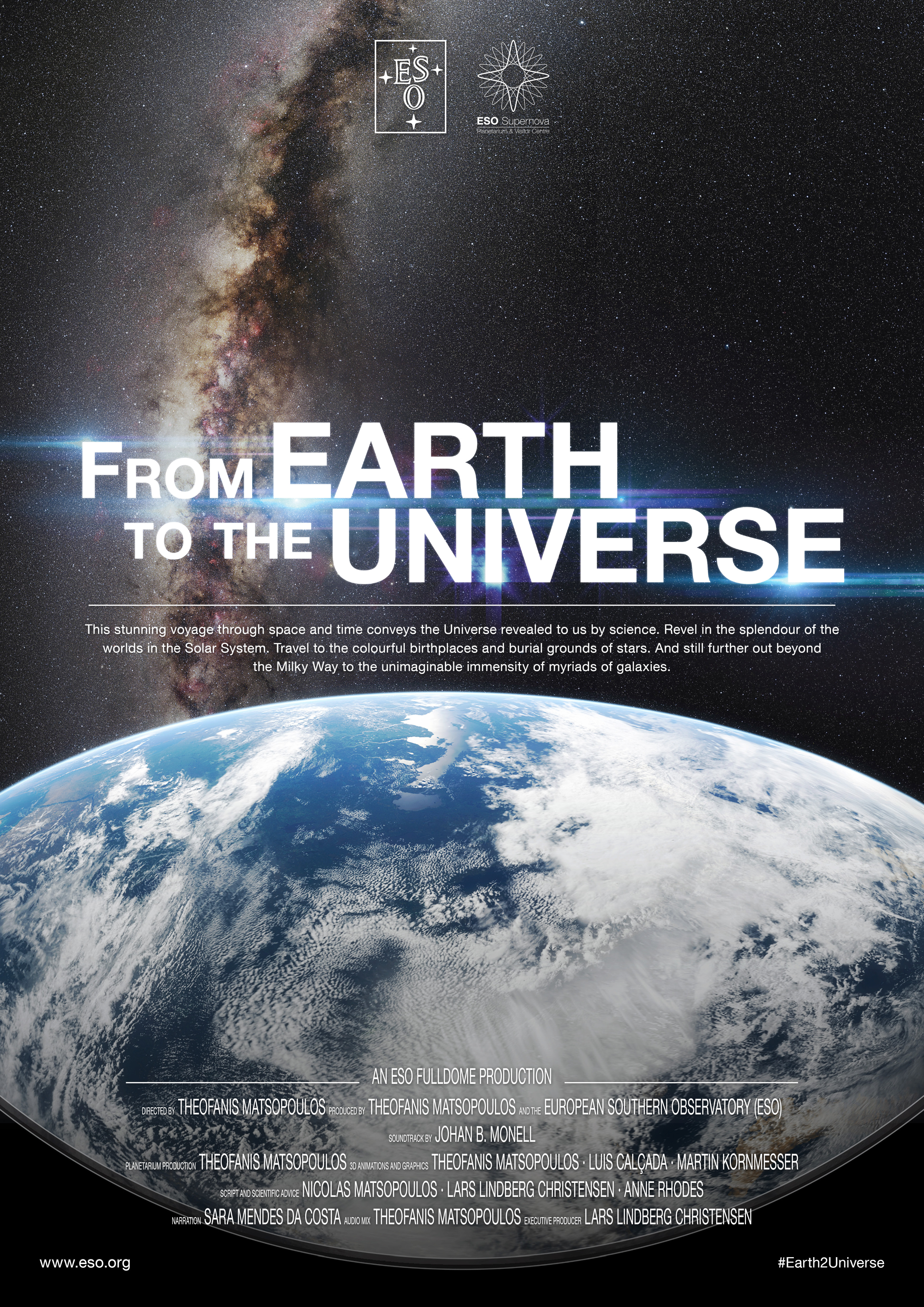
From Earth to the Universe Movie Poster

The Cornerstone project From Earth to the Universe (FETTU) is a worldwide public science event that began in June 2008, and still ongoing through 2011. This project has endeavored to bring astronomy images and their science to a wider audience in non-traditional informal learning venues. In placing these astronomy exhibitions in public parks, metro stations, art centers, hospitals, shopping malls and other accessible locations, it has been hoped that individuals who might normally ignore or even dislike astronomy, or science in general, will be engaged.

=== Developing Astronomy Globally ===
The Developing Astronomy Globally was a worldwide astronomy event that ran during 2–5 April 2009, as a Cornerstone project to acknowledge that astronomy needs to be developed in three key areas: professionally (universities and research); publicly (communication, media, and amateur groups) and educationally (schools and informal education structures). The focus was to be on regions that do not already have strong astronomical communities. The implementation was to be centred on training, development and networking in each of these three key areas.

This Cornerstone was using the momentum of IYA2009 to help establish and enhance regional structures and networks that work on the development of astronomy around the world. These networks were to support the current and future development work of the IAU and other programmes, plus ensure that developing regions could benefit from IYA2009 and the work of the other Cornerstone projects. It was to also address the question of the contribution of astronomy to development.

=== Galilean Nights ===
The Galilean Nights was a worldwide astronomy event that also ran 2–5 April 2009, as a project to involve both amateur and professional astronomers around the globe, taking to the streets their telescopes and pointing them as Galileo did 400 years ago. The sources of interest were Jupiter and its moons, the Sun, the Moon and many others celestial marvels. The event was scheduled to take place on 22–24 October 2009. Astronomers were to share their knowledge and enthusiasm for space by encouraging as many people as possible to look through a telescope at planetary neighbours.

== See also ==
- International Year of Astronomy commemorative coin
- International Astronomical Union (IAU)
- History of the telescope
- 365 Days of Astronomy
- 400 Years of the Telescope (documentary)
- Galileoscope
- Global Hands-On Universe
- National Astronomy Week (NAW)
- StarPeace Project
- The World At Night (TWAN)
- World Year of Physics 2005
- White House Astronomy Night
