= List of Indian physicists =

This is a list of Indian physicists.

== A ==
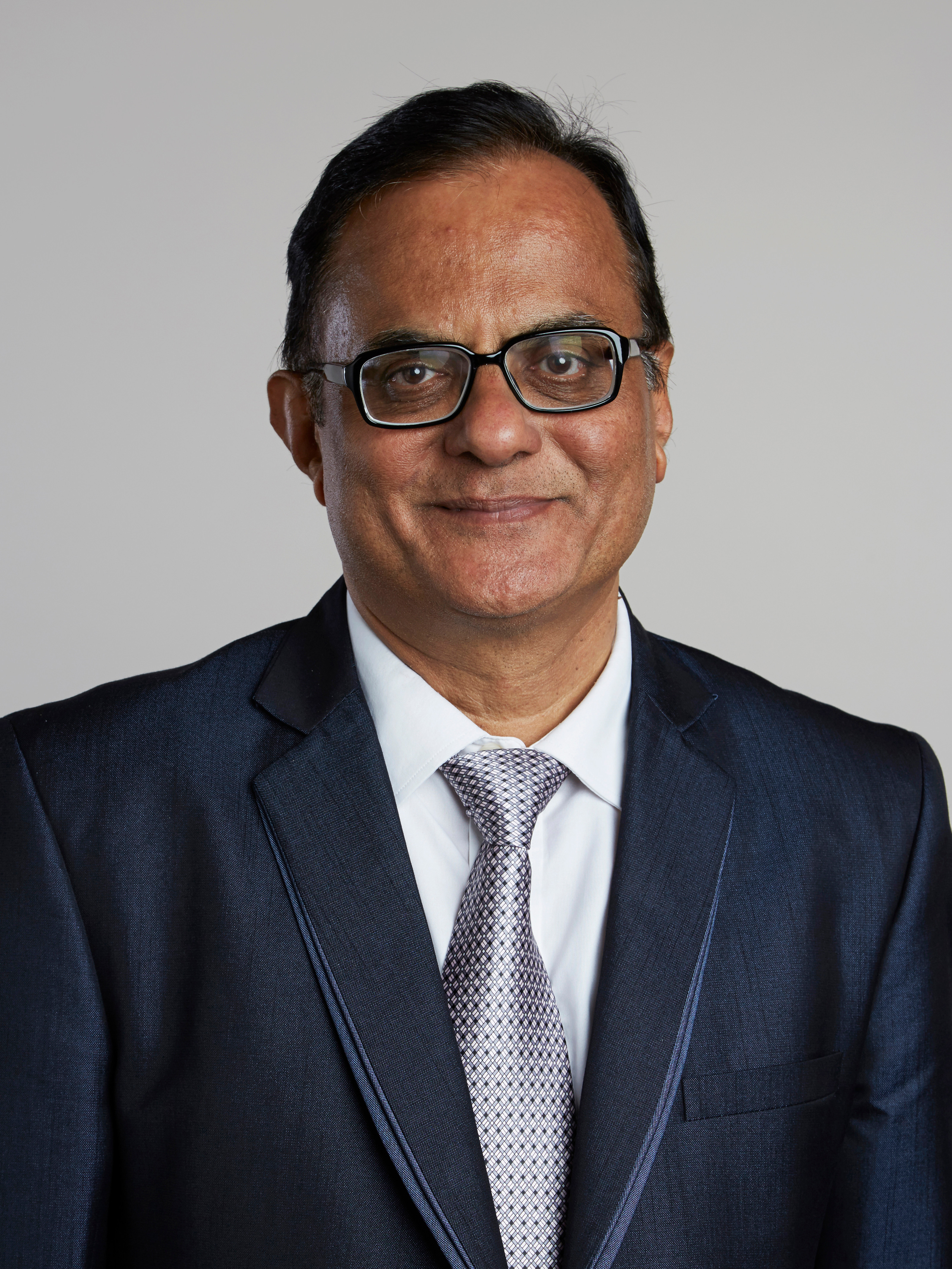
Ajay K Sood

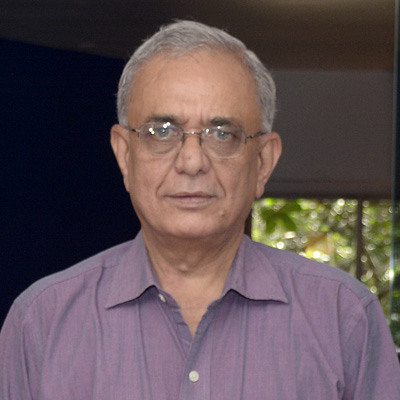
Ajit Kembhavi

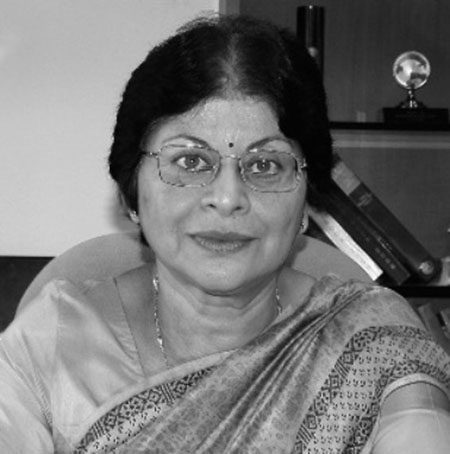
Archana Bhattacharyya

- Abhishek Dhar
- Aditi Sen De
- Ajay K. Sood
- Ajit Kembhavi
- Ajit Kumar Mohanty
- Ajit Ram Verma
- Ajoy Ghatak
- A. M. Jayannavar
- Amal Kumar Raychaudhuri
- Amitava Raychaudhuri
- Anil Kakodkar
- Aninda Sinha
- Anurag Sharma
- Apoorva D. Patel
- A. P. Balachandran
- Archana Bhattacharyya
- Archana Sharma
- Arnab Rai Choudhuri
- Arun K. Pati
- Arun Kumar Sarma
- Ashoke Sen
- Asoke Nath Mitra
- Atish Dabholkar
- Avinash Deshpande

== B ==
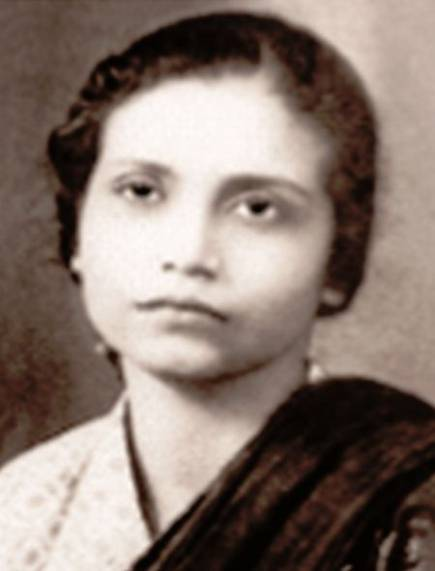
Bibha Chowdhuri

- Basanti Dulal Nagchaudhuri
- Basudeb Dasgupta
- Bibha Chowdhuri
- Bimla Buti
- Biswa Ranjan Nag
- Biswarup Mukhopadhyaya
- Bulbul Chakraborty
- B. V. Sreekantan

== C ==
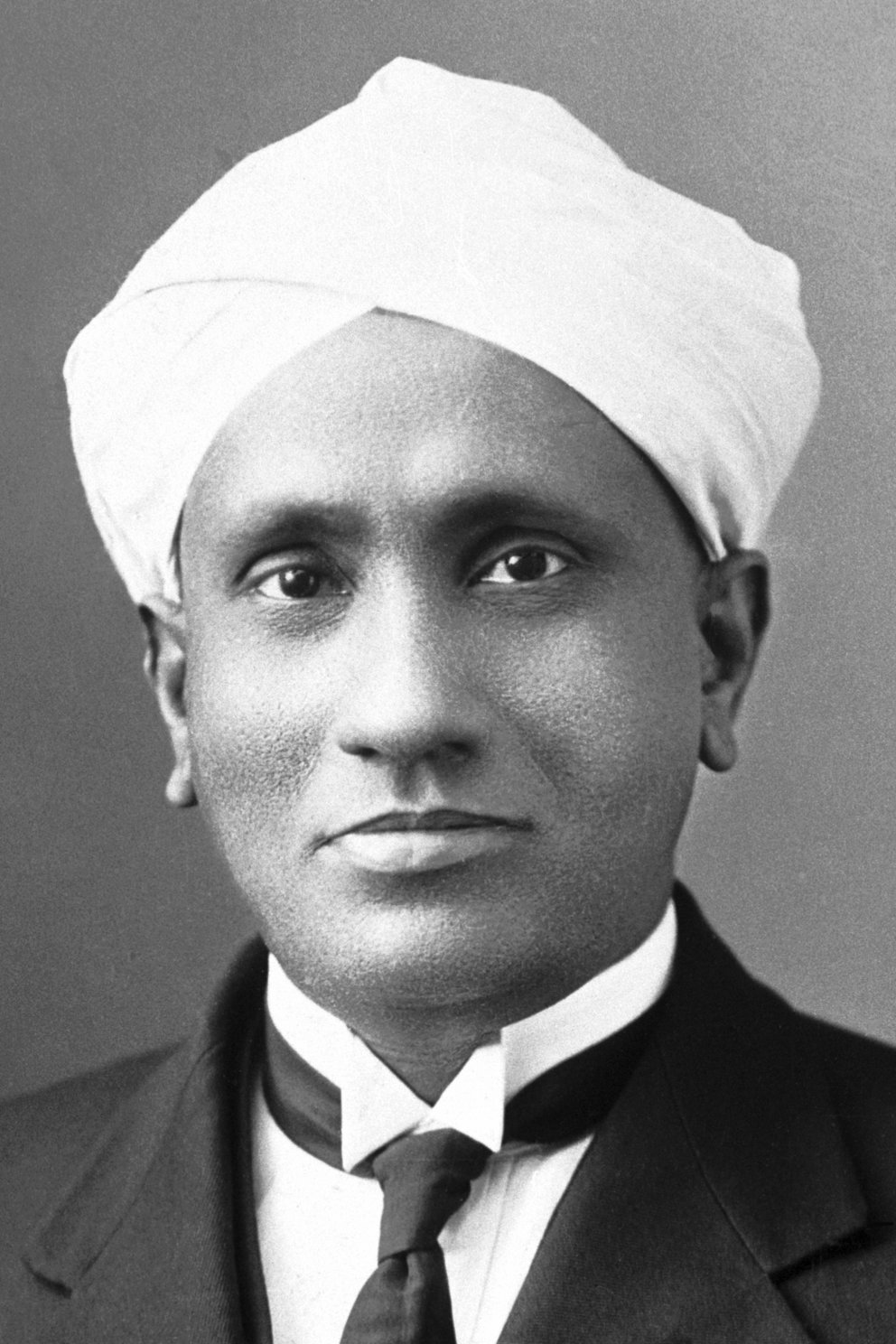
C. V. Raman

- C V Raman
- Chanchal Kumar Majumdar
- Chandrashekhar Joshi

== D ==
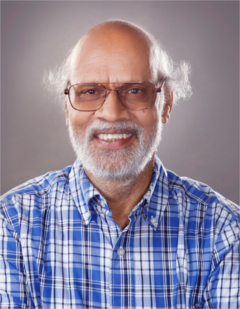
Daya Shankar Kulshreshtha

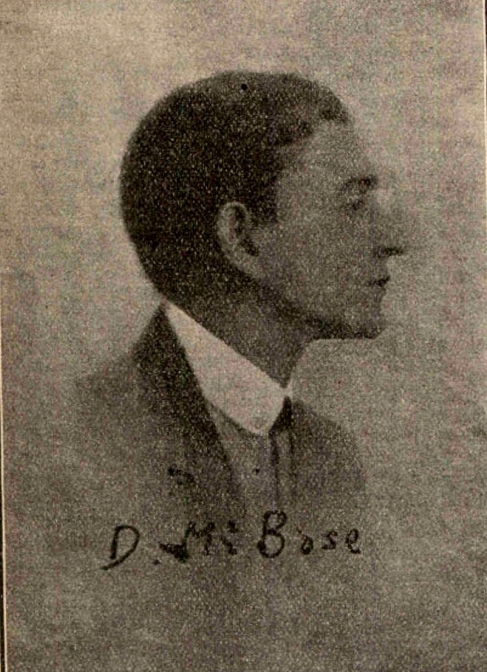
Debendra Mohan Bose

- Daya Shankar Kulshreshtha
- Debendra Mohan Bose
- Deepak Dhar
- Deepak Kumar
- Dhiraj Bora
- Dibyendu Nandi
- Dipan Ghosh
- Dipankar Banerjee
- Dipanwita Dutta

== E ==
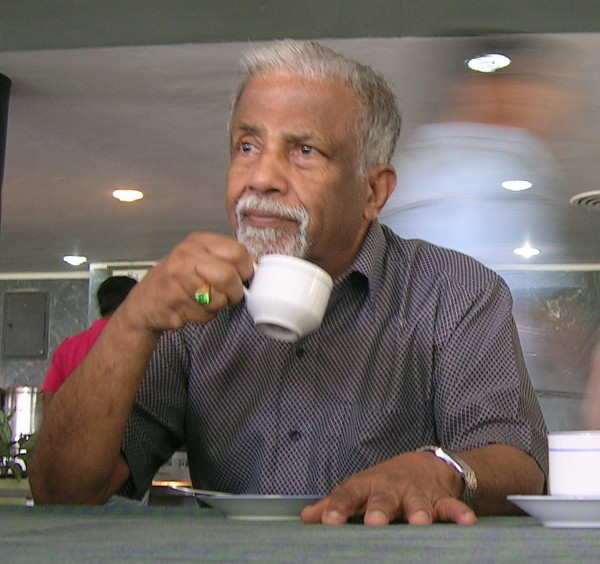
E. C. George Sudarshan

- E. V. Sampathkumaran
- E. C. George Sudarshan

== G ==
- Ganeshan Venkataraman
- Girish Saran Agarwal
- Gopal Krishna
- Govind P. Agrawal
- Govind Swarup

== H ==
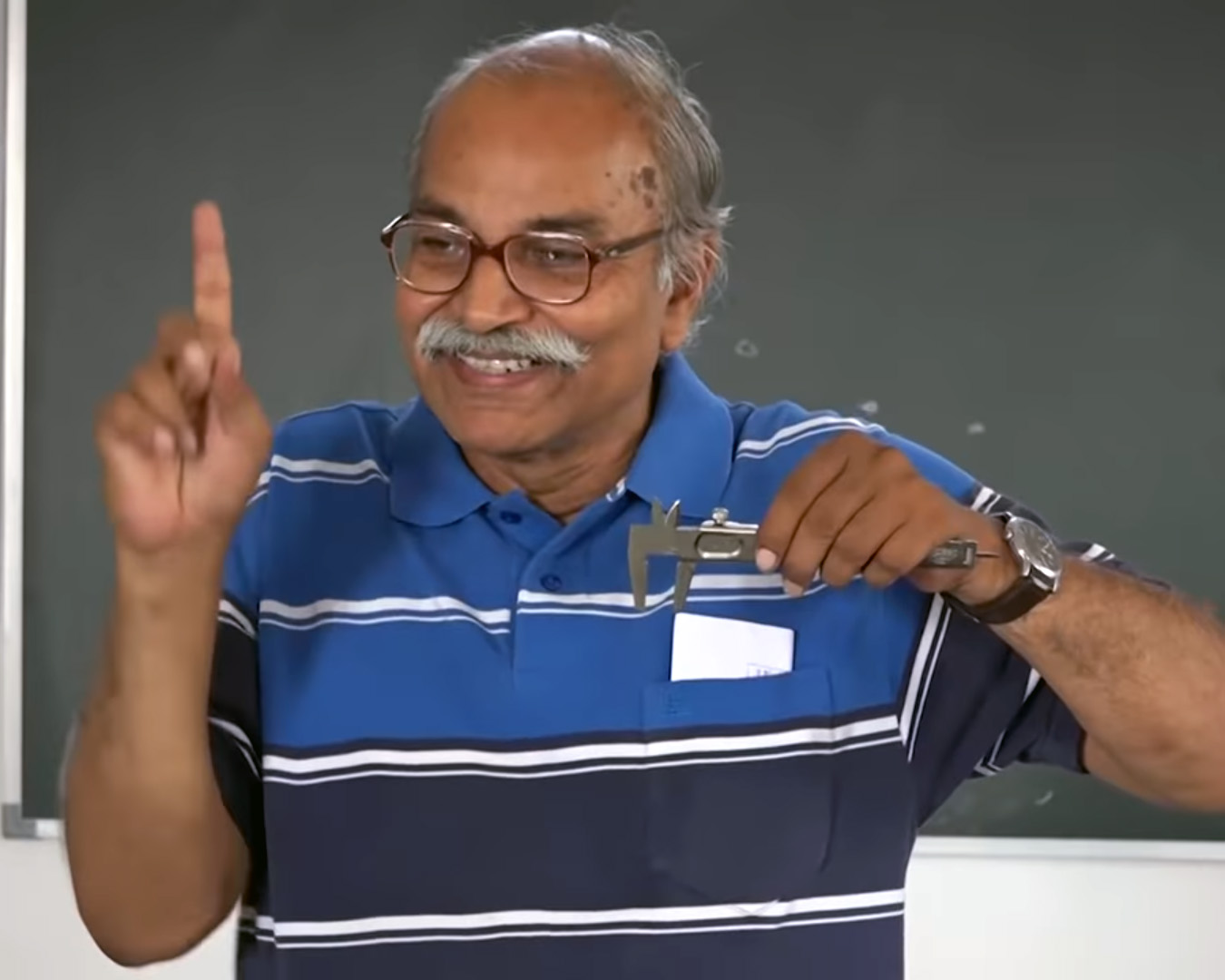
Harish Chandra Verma

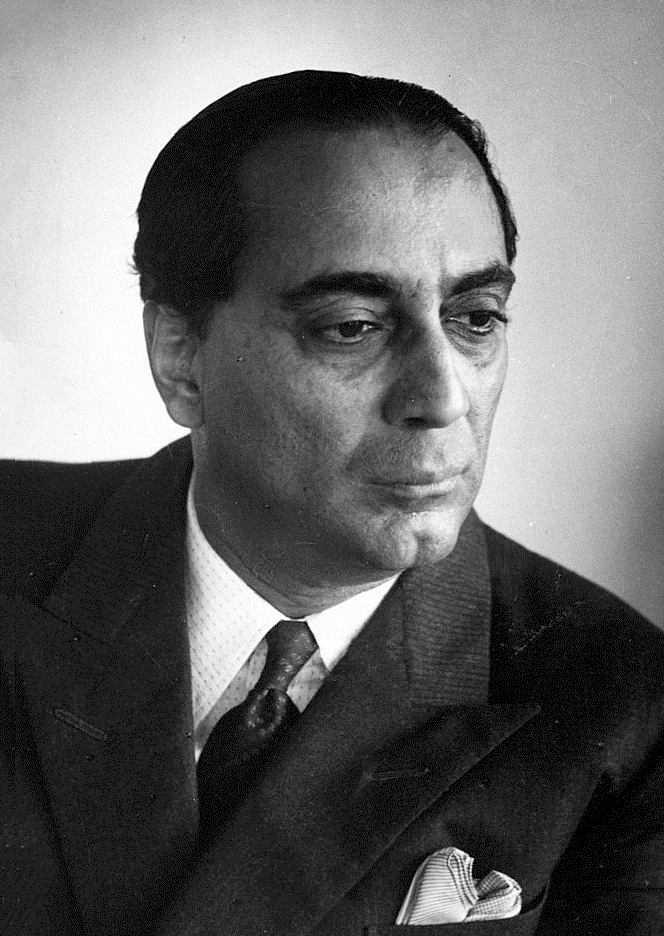
Homi J. Bhabha

- Hemangada Thakura
- H C Verma
- Homi J Bhabha
- Hosur Narasimhaiah

== I ==
- Indrani Bose

== J ==
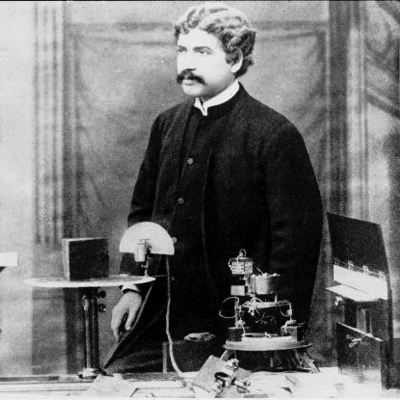
Jagdish Chandra Bose

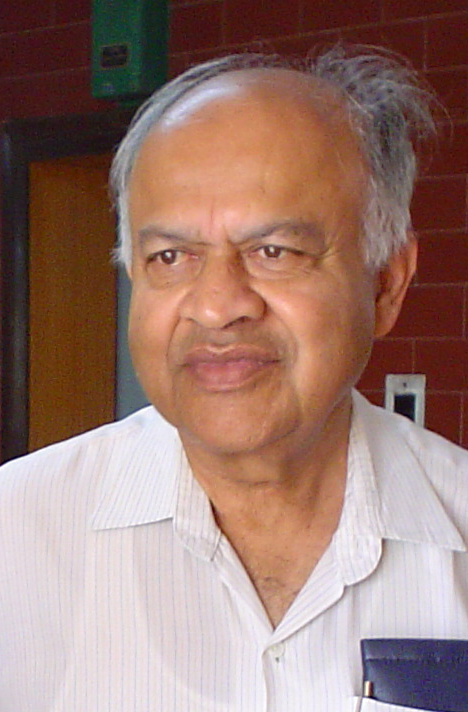
Jayant V Narlikar

- Jagdish Chandra Bose
- Jayant Narlikar

== K ==
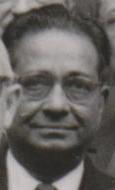
K. S. Krishnan

- Kanak Saha
- Kasturi Lal Chopra
- K N Pathak
- K. S. Krishnan
- K. S. Babu
- Kehar Singh
- Krityunjai Prasad Sinha

== L ==
- Lilabati Bhattacharjee

== M ==
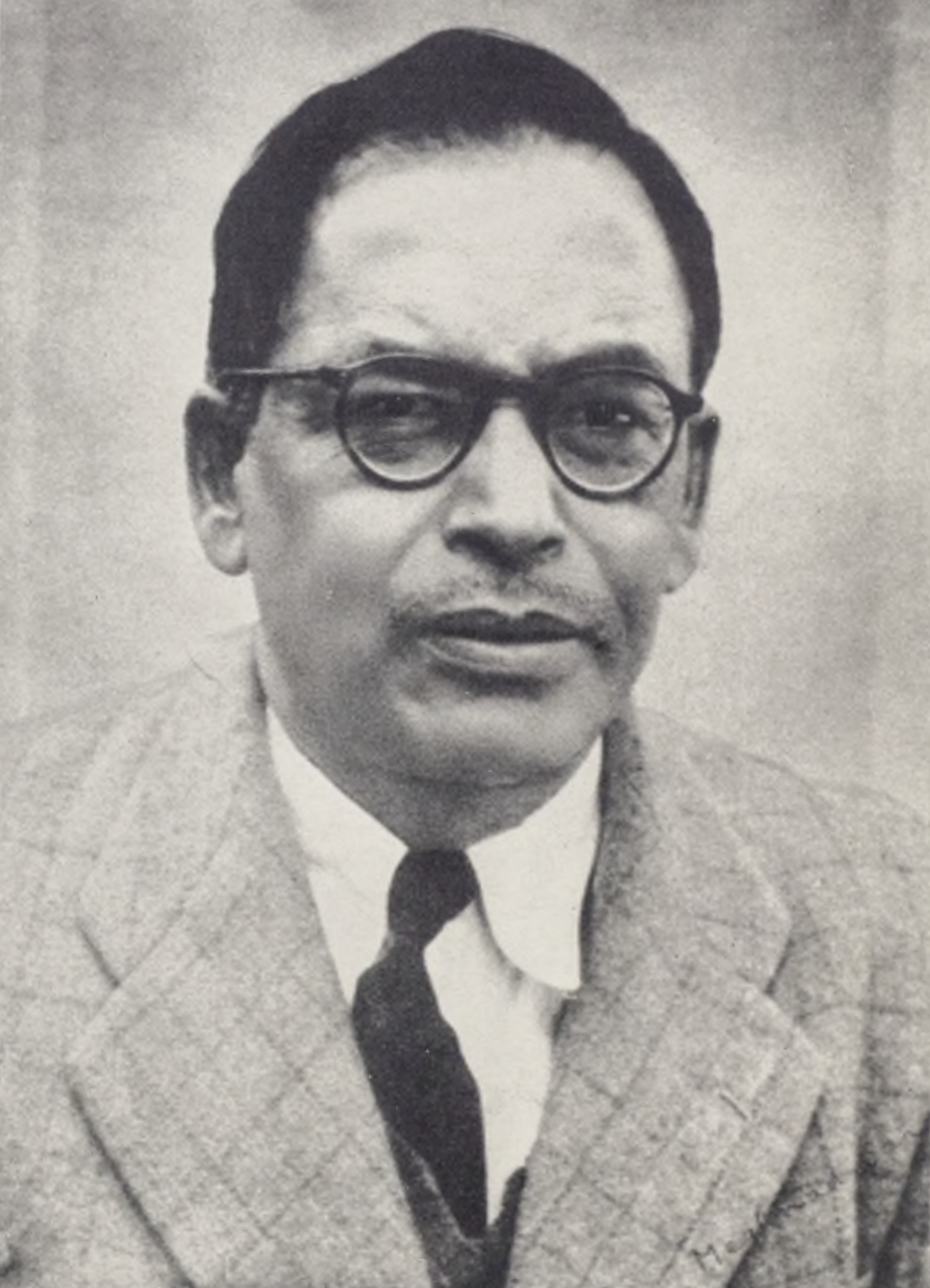
Meghnad Saha

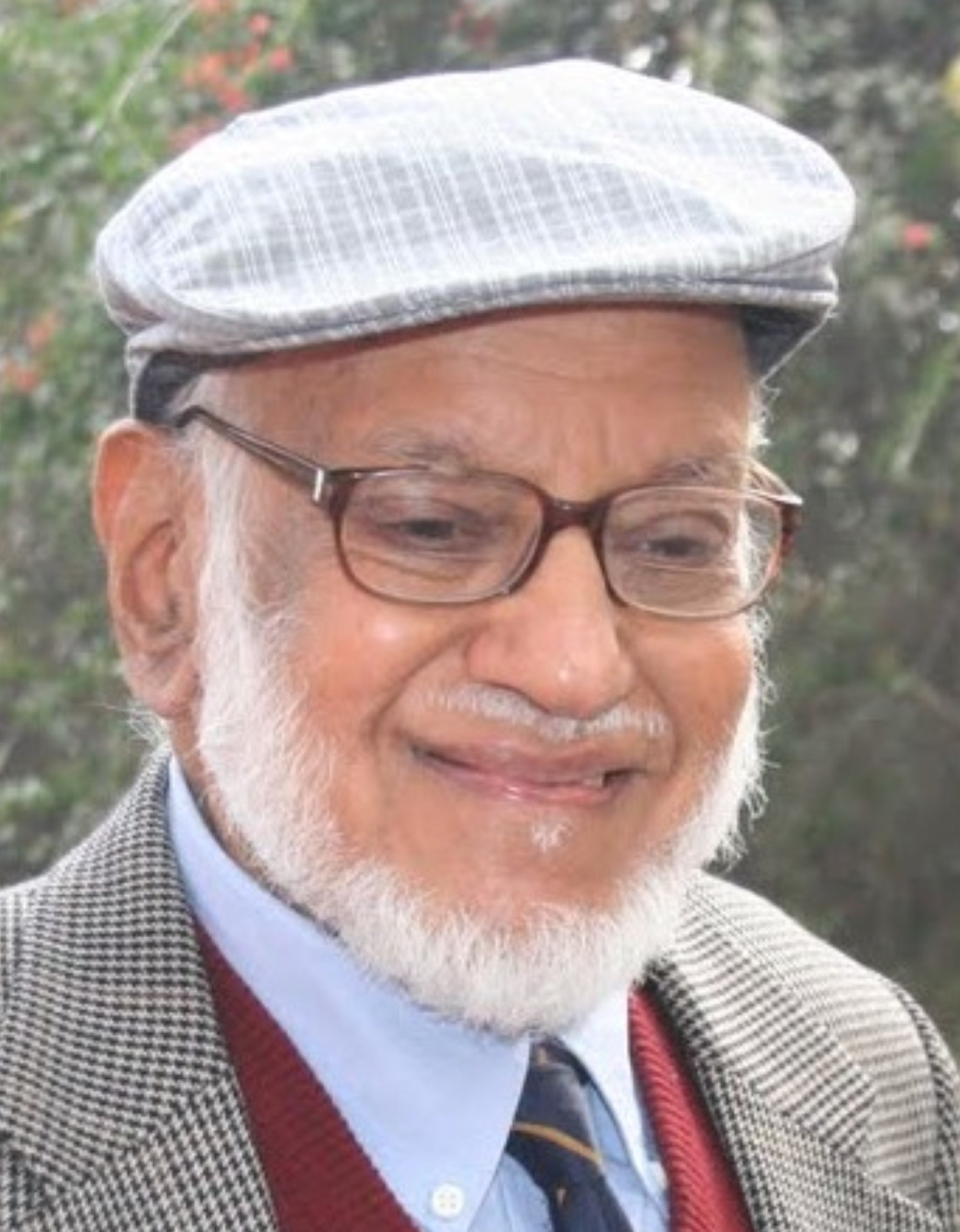
M. G. K. Menon

- Madan Rao
- Mahendra Singh Sodha
- Mani Lal Bhaumik
- Mausumi Dikpati
- Meghnad Saha
- M. C. Joshi
- M. G. K. Menon
- Mohit Randeria
- Mustansir Barma
- Muthusamy Lakshmanan

== N ==
- Nagendra Nagaraja
- Narasimhaiengar Mukunda
- Narendra Kumar
- Nissim Kanekar
- N. S. Satya Murthy
- N. V. Madhusudana

== O ==
- Onkar Nath Srivastava

== P ==
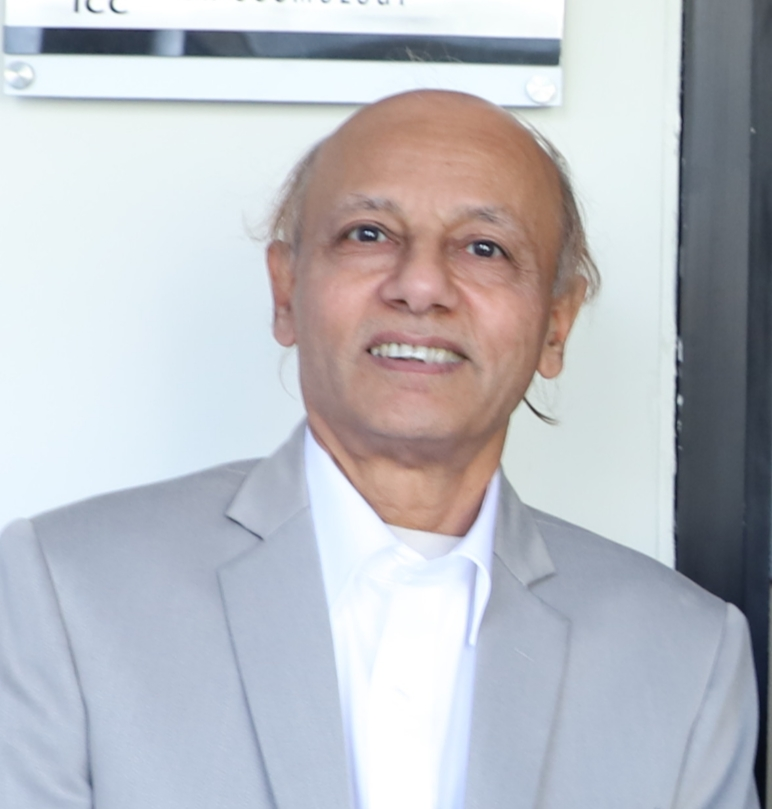
Pankaj Joshi

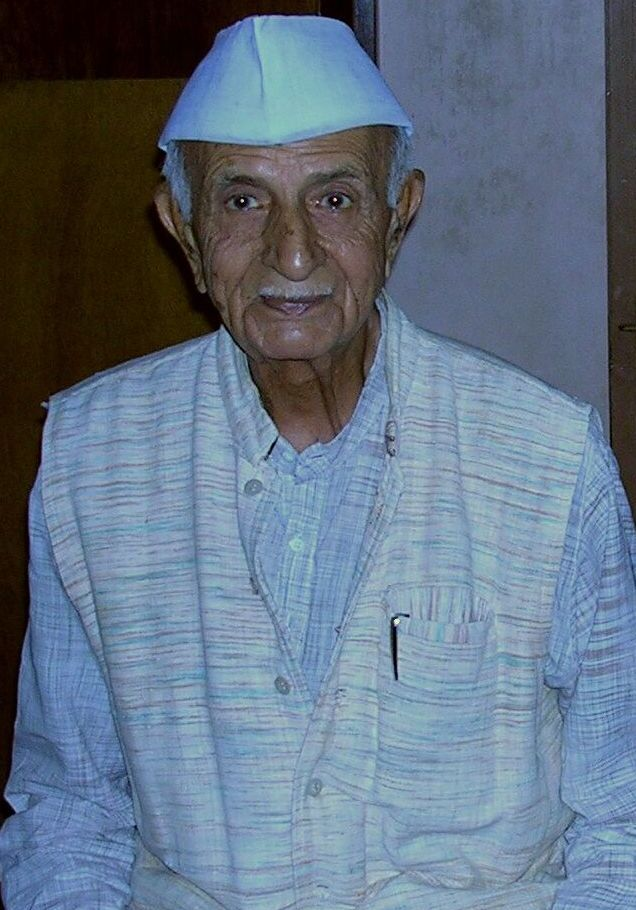
Prahalad Chunnilal Vaidya

- Pankaj Joshi
- Pinaki Majumdar
- P. K. Iyengar
- Prahalad Chunnilal Vaidya
- Pranab R. Dastidar
- Predhiman Krishan Kaw
- Probir Roy

== R ==
- Radha Balakrishnan
- Raghunathan Srianand
- Raja Ramanna
- Rajagopala Chidambaram
- Rajesh Gopakumar
- Rajiah Simon
- Ramanath Cowsik
- Ramanujan Srinivasan
- R. S. Krishnan
- Ratan Kumar Sinha
- Ravindra Kumar Sinha
- Rustum Roy
- Rajamani Vijayaraghavan

== S ==
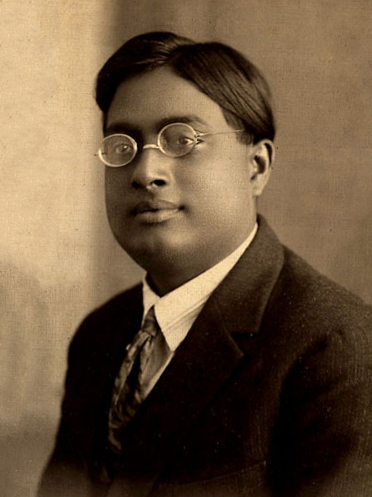
Satyendra Nath Bose

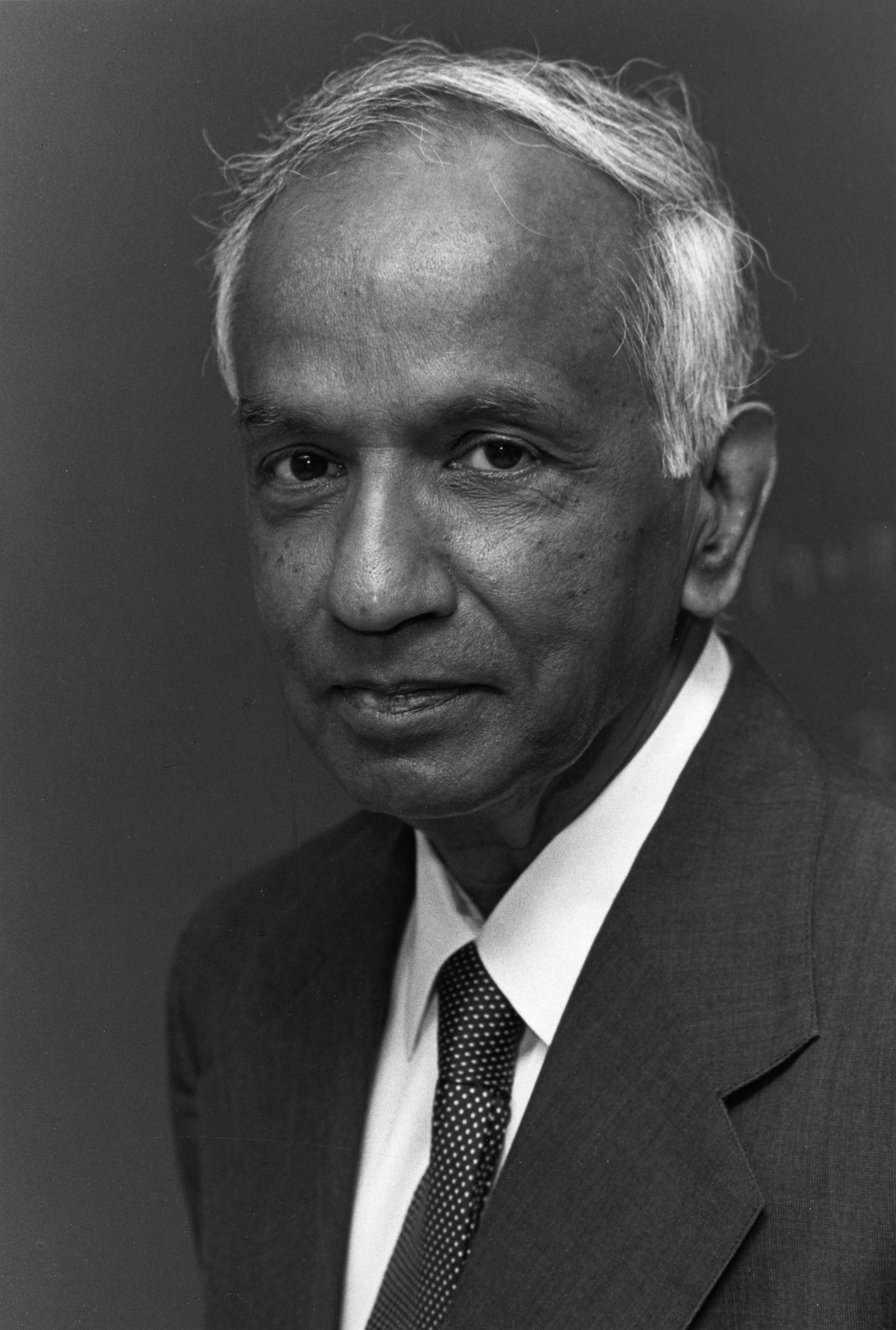
Subrahmanyan Chandrashekhar

- Samarendra Nath Biswas
- Sandip Trivedi
- Sanjay Puri
- Satya Prakash
- Satyendra Nath Bose
- S. K. Sikka
- Shasanka Mohan Roy
- Shashi P. Karna
- Shiraz Minwalla
- Shri Krishna Joshi
- Shyam Sunder Kapoor
- Siva Brata Bhattacherjee
- Sivaramakrishna Chandrasekhar
- Somak Raychaudhury
- Subir Sachdev
- Subodh Raghunath Shenoy
- Subrahmanyan Chandrasekhar
- Sudhanshu Shekhar Jha
- Sudhir Kumar Vempati
- Sulabha K. Kulkarni
- Sumit Ranjan Das
- Sunil Mukhi
- Surhud More
- Sushanta Kumar Dattagupta

== T ==
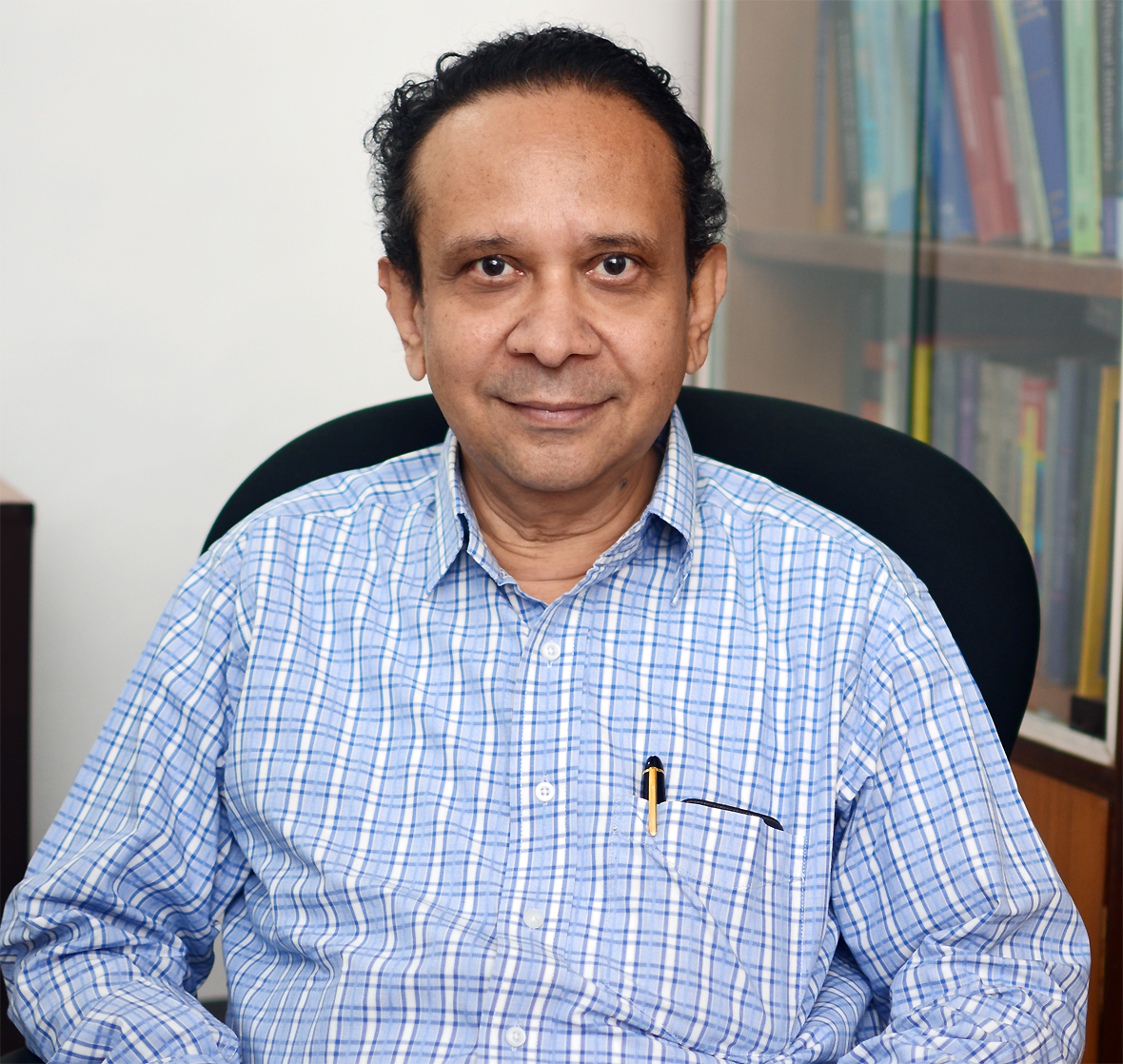
Thanu Padmanabhan

- Tathagat Avatar Tulsi
- Thanu Padmanabhan

== U ==
- Urbasi Sinha
- Usha Kulshreshtha

== V ==
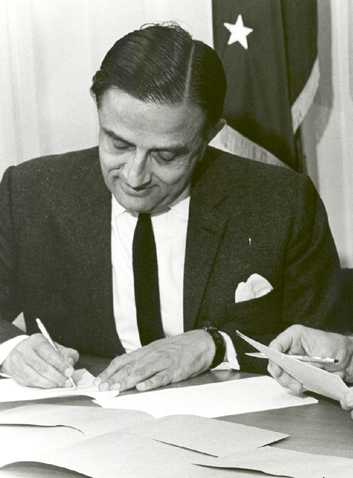
Vikram Sarabhai

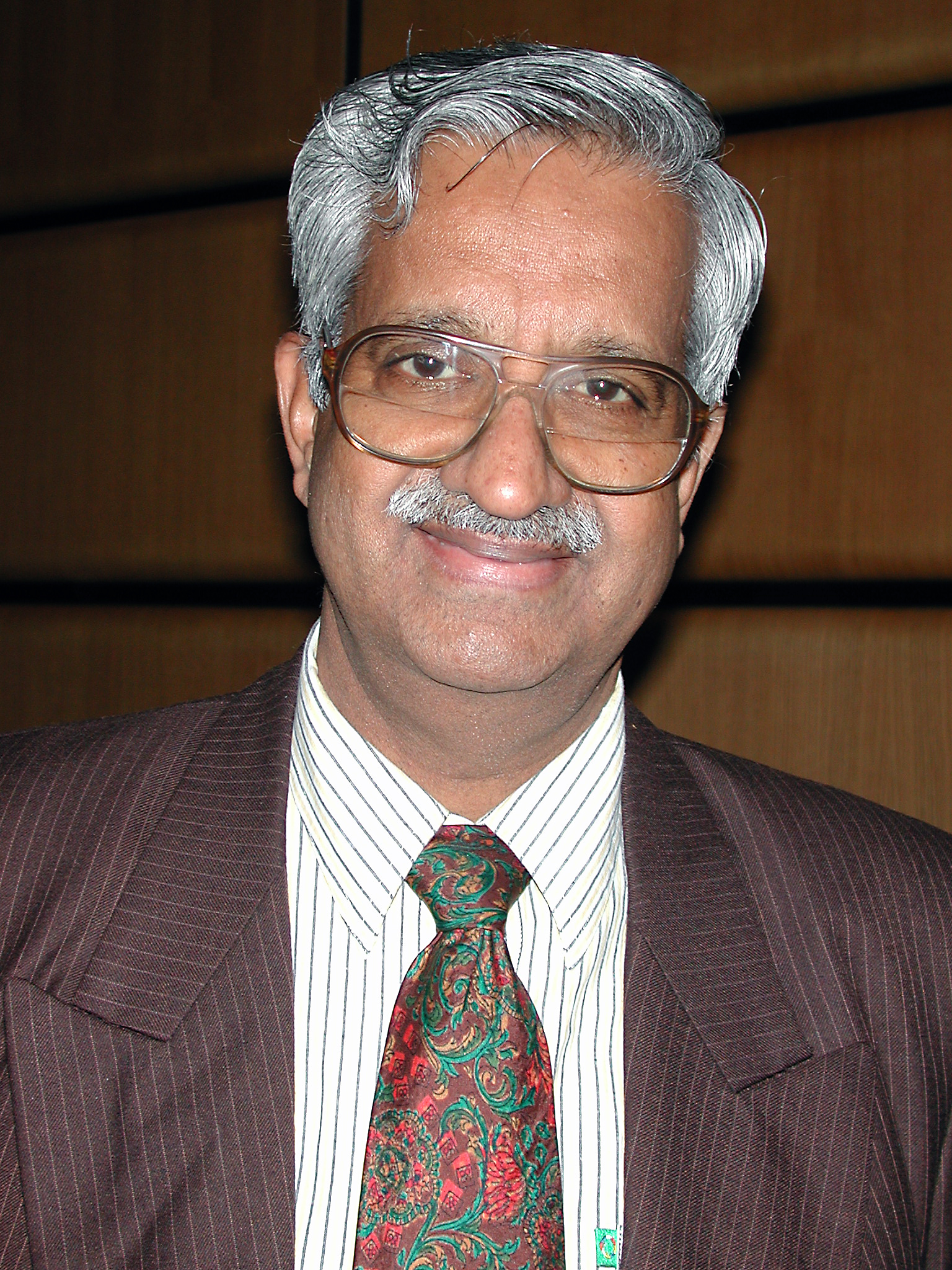
V. S. Ramamurthy

- Vainu Bappu
- Varun Sahni
- V. K. Iya
- V. S. Ramamurthy
- Vijay Kumar Kapahi
- Vikram Sarabhai
- Vinod Krishan
- Virendra Singh
- Vishnu Vasudev Narlikar

== Y ==
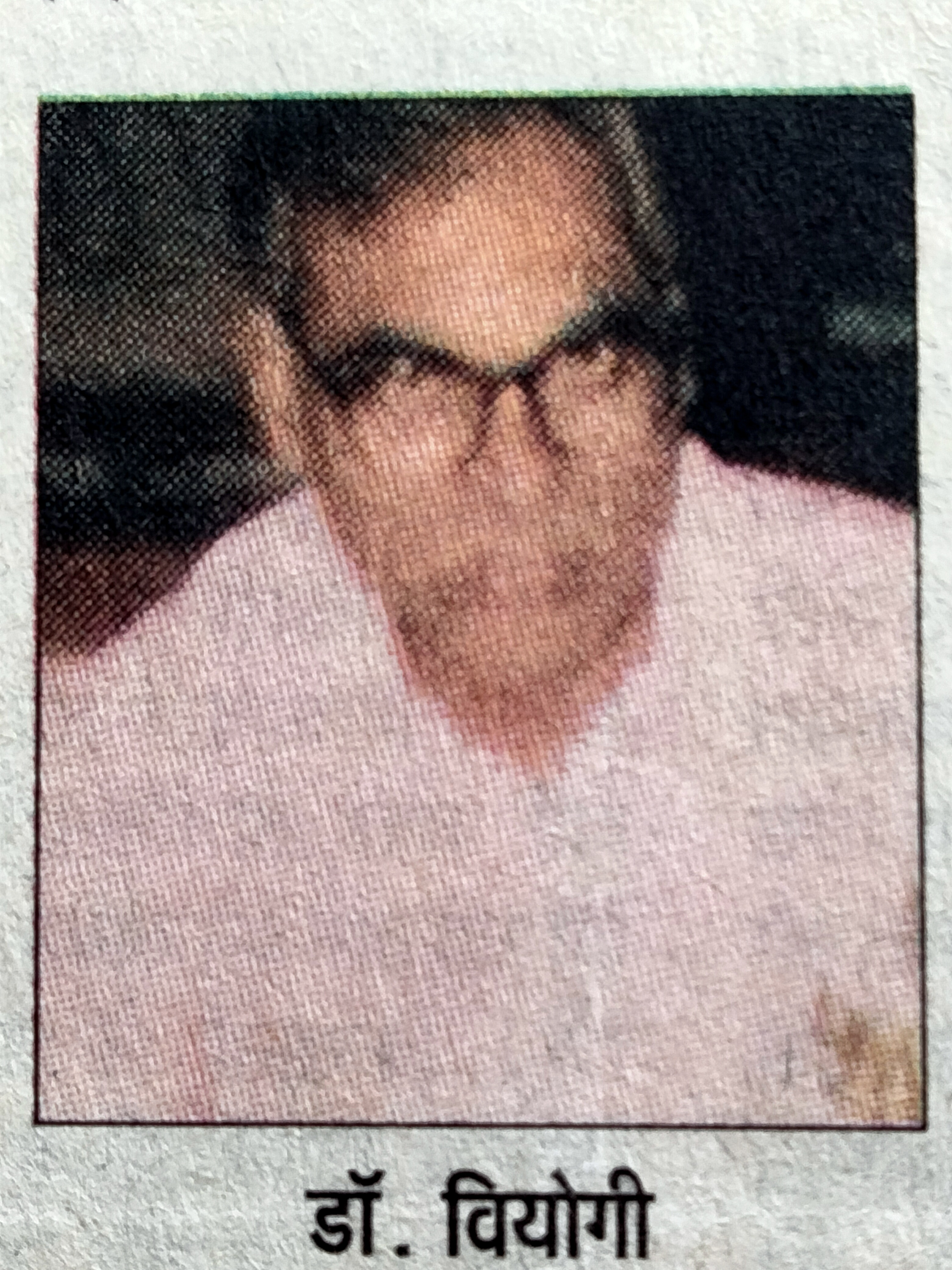
Y P Viyogi

- Yashwant Gupta
- Y P Viyogi
