= Girawali Observatory =

IUCAA Girawali Observatory
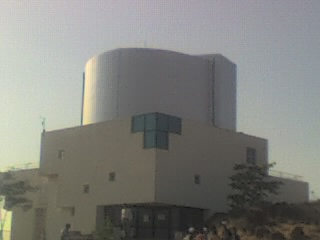
- Alternative names: IGO:2m
- Organization: Inter-University Centre for Astronomy and Astrophysics
- Location: Girawali, Maharashtra, India
- Coordinates: 19°4′25.29″N 73°50′40″E
- Altitude: 1,000 m (3,300 ft)
- Established: 2006
- Website: IUCAA Girawali Observatory

Telescopes
- 2m Telescope: 2m, optical, Alt-Azm mount
- Related media on Commons

IUCAA Girawali Observatory is an optical astronomy observatory run by the Inter-University Centre for Astronomy and Astrophysics (IUCAA), Pune, India. The Observatory is located about 80 km from Pune, off the Pune Nashik Highway in Girawali.

== History ==
The Inter-University Centre for Astronomy and Astrophysics (IUCAA) felt the need of an optical telescope for observation, research, training and for the University community. Therefore, a proposal was made to set up a medium-sized optical telescope, preferably close to the IUCAA campus in Pune. The University Grants Commission provided funding for the project.

A contract was signed with the Particle Physics and Astronomy Research Council (PPARC) of the United Kingdom, which gave the contract to the Telescope Technologies Ltd of Liverpool, UK.

The telescope was installed, calibrated and handed over to the team at IUCAA on 14 February 2006. The Observatory was formally inaugurated and the telescope dedicated to the Astronomy community by Prof. Yash Pal on 13 May 2006. After a phase of performance and science verification, the Observatory was opened for regular observations in November, 2006.

== Location ==
The observatory is located near Junnar, 80 km from Pune City, off the Pune Nashik Road. It is located close to Girawali Village and is on top of a small hill that is part of a Reserved Forest.

== Technical specifications ==
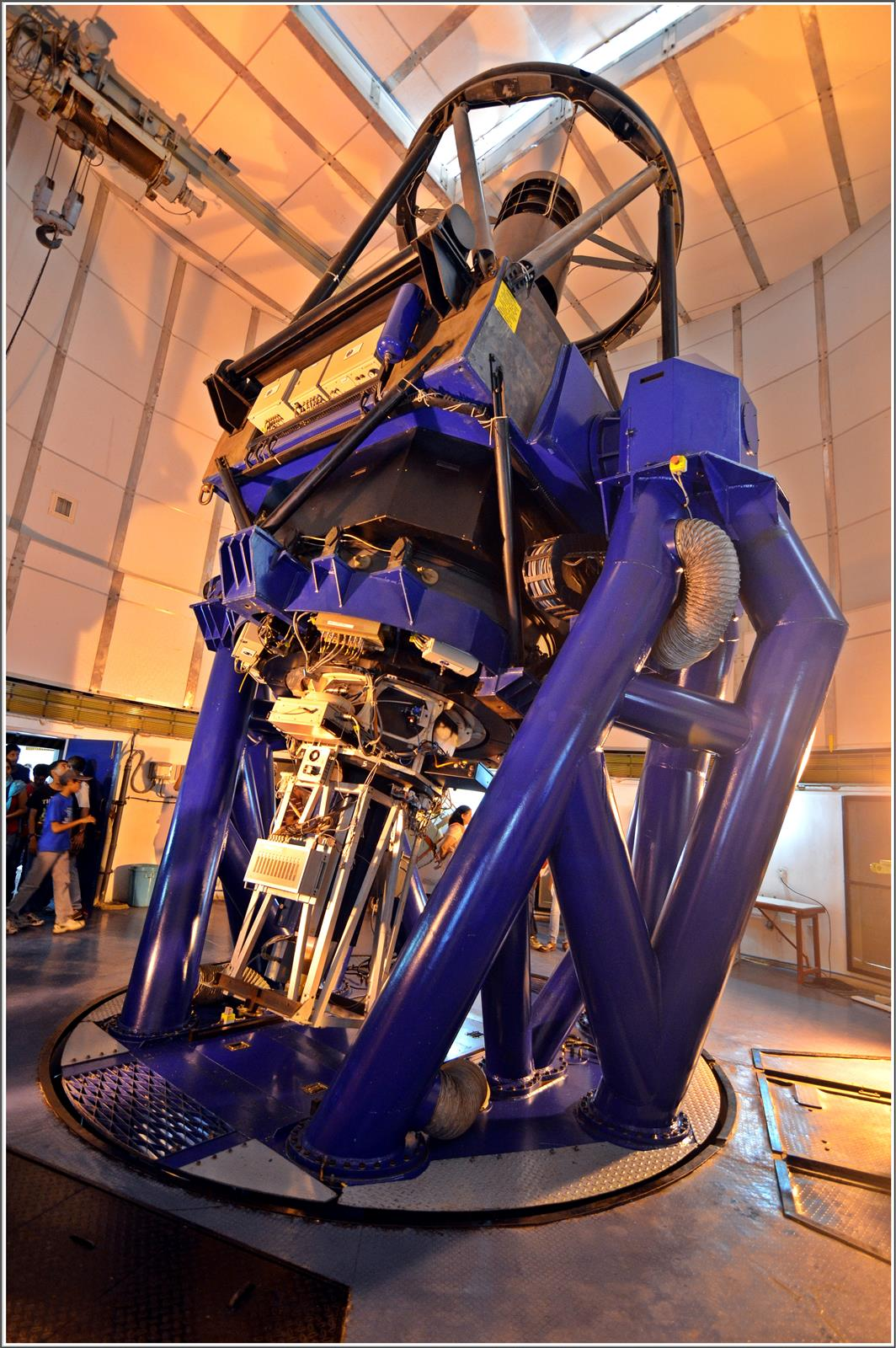
Telescope in the observatory

=== Telescope ===
The main 2m telescope at IGO is made up of a primary mirror of 200 cm with f/3 and a secondary mirror of 62 cm with f/10. It has 1 direct and 4 side Cassegrain ports with an uncorrected field of view (direct) of 6 arcminute radius.

=== IFOSC ===
The IUCAA Faint Object Spectrograph and Camera (IFOSC) is the main instrument available on the telescope's main Cassegrain port. IFOSC employs an EEV 2K x 2K, thinned, back-illuminated CCD with 13.5 micrometer pixels. The spatial sampling scale at the detector is 44μm per arcsecond giving a field of view of about 10.5 arcminutes on the side. In addition to ultraviolet, blue, violet, red, infrared imaging and photometric capabilities, IFOSC offers a range of grisms with resolutions ranging from 190 to 3700 covering the wavelength region of 350–850 nm. Long slit, slitless, multislit and Echelle (with cross-disperser) modes are available offering a wide range of observational possibilities.

IFOSC's capabilities are further enhanced with imaging polarimetric as well as spectropolarimetric modes with a reduced field of view of about 2 arcminute radius.

A calibration unit provides a set of lamps for flat field and spectral calibration. A set of five narrow band filters of 8.0 nm FWHM, are also housed in the calibration unit. These are particularly suitable for local and red-shifted H-alpha studies, having nominal central wavelengths of 656.3, 660.3, 664.3, 668.3 and 672.3.

=== PI-CCD ===
The Princeton Instruments CCD (PI-CCD) camera is mounted on one of the side ports. The camera employs a 1340x1300 pixel, thinned, back-illuminated E2V CCD. The 20μm pixels give better spatial sampling than IFOSC. A set of Ultra-violet, Blue, Violet, Red, Infrared filters identical to those used in IFOSC is available for this instrument. A summary of the instrument parameters are given below:

- Pixels: 1340 x 1300, 20μm square
- Image Scale: 97μm per arcsecond (0.2 arcsecond per pixel)
- On chip binning: 2x2
- Single Pixel Full Well: 300ke
- Dynamic range: 16 bits

This sensor can operate with a 14-bit ADC and still achieve the same full well. The full well is the total electrons per count, so in this case the gain is ~4.6. The downfall with running this CCD in this config is the 2x2 bin. You must set it up to run with an attenuation if trying to run in other speeds and binnings.

== Observation and Science ==
This Observatory is unique in setting aside time specifically for training as well as observational proposal from Indian Universities apart from astronomical observation. The observatory is available for astronomical observations from October to May in two proposal cycles of four-month duration each. The IGO-TAC is responsible for allocation of approximately 60% of the observing time. Director's Discretionary Time as well as time for Targets of Opportunity, Training Programmes, Observatory projects, Maintenance and Compensation will constitute the remaining 40% of the time.

== See also ==
- List of astronomical observatories
