= P. Sreekumar (astrophysicist) =

Indian astrophysicist

- Other name: Parameshwaran Sreekumar
- Education: Doctor of Philosophy
- Alma mater: University of New Hampshire
- Occupation: Astrophysicist
- Employer: University of New Hampshire

Parameshwaran Sreekumar is an Indian astrophysicist and the former Director of the Indian Institute of Astrophysics. He has also worked in NASA and ISRO and is currently the Director of Manipal Center for Natural Sciences, under Manipal Academy of Higher Education, Manipal.

== Biography ==
P. Sreekumar got his Bachelor of Science degree from the University of Kerala and Master of Science in Physics from the Indian Institute of Technology - Bombay. He later moved to the United States to pursue his PhD at the University of New Hampshire, where he worked on gamma-ray astronomy, under John. A. Lockwood in 1981. He worked as a post-doctoral researcher with focus on the emerging area of observing the Universe in gamma-rays using NASA's Compton Gamma Ray Observatory. He continued to work at NASA's Goddard Space Flight Center as a research scientist, working as a core member of the EGRET payload team of NASA's Compton Gamma-ray Observatory until 1999.

Sreekumar returned to India and joined the Indian Space Research Organization in 1999, where he headed the astronomy division at the ISRO Satellite Center. He was deputed from ISRO as the Director of Indian Institute of Astrophysics in 2013 on a five-year term. In 2018, he returned to ISRO HQ as the Director of the Space Science Program office until his superannuation in January 2020. After superannuation, he served as the 'Prof. Satish Dhawan' Professor at ISRO HQ and worked as an Advisor to the Space science Program Office until 2023.

He was appointed as the Director of the Manipal Center for Natural Sciences, under MAHE in 2023. He is currently heading the center.

== Career ==
Dr. Sreekumar is the Co-Principal Investigator of India's first dedicated astronomy observatory, AstroSat. He has served as the Principal Investigator for payloads on lunar missions and is currently a member or Chair of numerous review committees related to ISRO's space science missions.

Additionally, Dr. Sreekumar plays a significant role in senior-level management committees for international programs involving Indian collaborations, such as the LIGO-India program, SKA-India, and the India-TMT programs. He is also a life member of the Astronomical Society of India and the International Astronomical Union.

Over the years, Dr. Sreekumar’s primary research interests have evolved from studying gamma rays and X-rays from cosmic sources to examining the composition of the Sun’s corona and mapping chemical elements on the lunar surface. As an experimentalist, his recent work has focused on designing and developing X-ray mirrors for future space applications.

== Awards and recognitions ==
1. National Science Talent Scholarship, 1976
2. NASA Group Achievement award 1991
3. NASA/GSFC Special Act Group award 1992
4. Universities Space Research Association Scientific Excellence award 1993
5. Hari Om Ashram prerit Vikram Sarabhai Award for Space Sciences 2003
6. Chandrayaan-1 payload team award 2009
7. Prof. Satish Dhawan Professorship at ISRO.
