= Varun Sahni =

Indian theoretical physicist (born 1956)

- Born: March 29, 1956 (age 70)
- Education: Moscow State University (PhD)
- Known for: Studies on Dark Energy, large-scale structure of the Universe
- Father: Bhisham Sahni
- Awards: Shanti Swarup Bhatnagar Prize (2000); Homi Bhabha Medal (2014)
- Scientific career
- Fields: Astrophysics; Astronomy
- Institutions: Inter-University Centre for Astronomy and Astrophysics
- Doctoral advisor: Alexei Starobinsky

Varun Bhisham Sahni (born 29 March 1956) is an Indian theoretical physicist, astrophysicist and a distinguished professor at the Inter-University Centre for Astronomy and Astrophysics. Known for his research on cosmology, Sahni is an elected fellow of all the three major Indian science academies viz. Indian Academy of Sciences, Indian National Science Academy and National Academy of Sciences, India. The Council of Scientific and Industrial Research, the apex agency of the Government of India for scientific research, awarded him the Shanti Swarup Bhatnagar Prize for Science and Technology, one of the highest Indian science awards, for his contributions to physical sciences in 2000. (Note: Long link - please select award year to see details)

Sahni is reported to have studied the universe, more specifically its large-scale structure, the early inflationary phase and cosmological constant. His achievements include the establishment of a cosmic no-hair theorem related to inflation, analysis of the universe structure using self-developed statistical methods, discovery of novel models of dark energy and dark matter, design of unified models of Inflation and dark energy and the elucidation of Big Bang theory using Braneworld physics. His studies have been documented by way of a number of articles (Note: Please see Selected bibliography section) and the online article repository of the Indian Academy of Sciences has listed 68 of them.

Sahni is a member of the International Astronomical Union. He has delivered plenary addresses at many conferences and seminars; "Cosmology after the BOOMERANG experiment" delivered at the Astronomy Seminars 2000 of the Tata Institute of Fundamental Research and Frontiers of Cosmology and Gravitation (ICGC 2011) of the International Centre for Theoretical Sciences were two of them. The School of Applied Mathematical and Physical Sciences of the National Technical University of Athens has listed one of his talks on Dark matter and dark energy, delivered in March 2004, as the best cited among Aegean School talks. He is also a recipient of the Homi Bhabha Medal (2014) of the Indian National Science Academy.

== Selected bibliography ==
=== Chapters ===
- Eleftherios Papantonopoulos; Varun Sahni (Chapter author) (7 January 2005). "Dark Matter and Dark Energy". The Physics of the Early Universe. Springer Science & Business Media. pp. 141–. ISBN 978-3-540-22712-0.

=== Articles ===
- Varun Sahni, Peter Coles (1995). "Approximation Methods for Non-linear Gravitational Clustering". Phys. Rep. 262 (1–2): 1–135. arXiv:astro-ph/9505005. Bibcode:1995PhR...262....1S. doi:10.1016/0370-1573(95)00014-8. S2CID 119442929.
- Varun Sahni (2005). "Dark Matter and Dark Energy". In E. Papantonopoulos (ed.). The Physics of the Early Universe. Lecture Notes in Physics. Vol. 653. pp. 141–180. Bibcode:2005LNP...653....3T. doi:10.1007/b99562. ISBN 978-3-540-22712-0.
- Varun Sahni (2006). "Dark Energy". Journal of Physics: Conference Series. 31 (1): 115–122. Bibcode:2006JPhCS..31..115S. doi:10.1088/1742-6596/31/1/020.
- Varun Sahni, Arman Shafieloo, Alexei A. Starobinsky (2008). "Two new diagnostics of dark energy". Phys. Rev. D. 78 (10) 103502. arXiv:0807.3548. Bibcode:2008PhRvD..78j3502S. doi:10.1103/PhysRevD.78.103502. S2CID 118452106.
- Varun Sahni (2014). "Ya. B. Zeldovich (1914-1987): Chemist, Nuclear Physicist, Cosmologist". Resonance. 16: 463–467. arXiv:1403.1537. Bibcode:2014arXiv1403.1537S.

== See also ==
- Somak Raychaudhury
