= Ganeshan Venkataraman =

Indian condensed matter physicist

- Born: 6 October 1932 (age 93); Madurai, Tamil Nadu, India
- Occupations: Condensed matter physicist Writer
- Awards: Padma Shri; UGC Sir C. V. Raman Award; INSA Indira Gandhi Prize

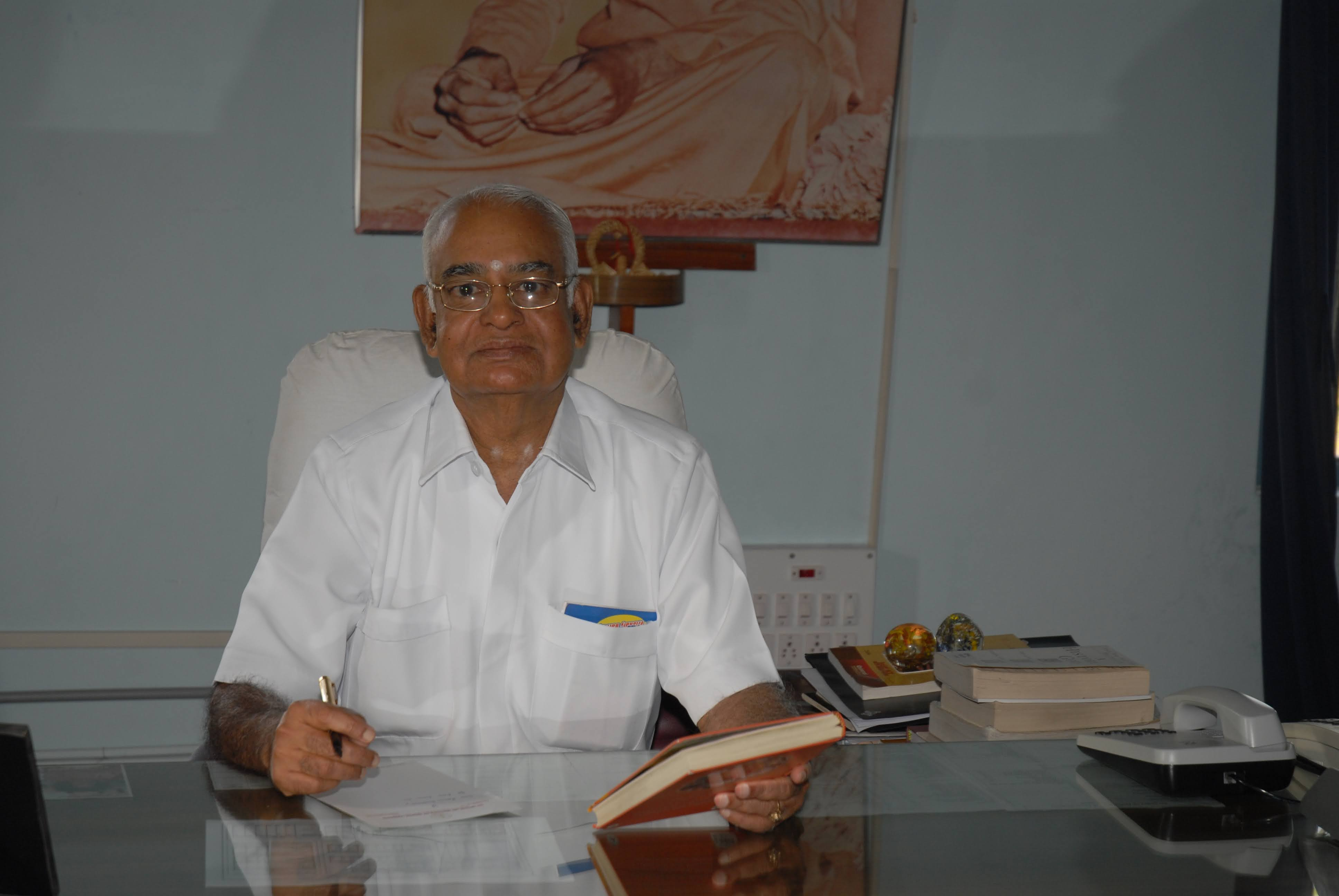
Dr. Ganeshan Venkataraman in the Vice Chancellors chambers of the Sri Sathya Sai University

Ganeshan Venkataraman is an Indian condensed matter physicist, writer and a former vice chancellor of the Sri Sathya Sai University. An elected fellow of the Indian National Science Academy, and the Indian Academy of Sciences, Venkataraman is a recipient of Jawaharlal Nehru Fellowship, Sir C. V. Raman Prize of the University Grants Commission and the Indira Gandhi Prize for Popularisation of Science of the Indian National Science Academy. The Government of India awarded him the fourth highest civilian award of Padma Shri in 1991.

== Biography ==
Venkataraman was born on 6 October 1932, at Madurai in the south Indian state of Tamil Nadu. After his post graduation, he joined Bhabha Atomic Research Centre (BARC) and worked at various stations including the Indira Gandhi Centre for Atomic Research, Kalpakkam, where he served as the director of the Physics, Electronics and Instrumentation Group. During this period, he pursued his doctoral research and secured a doctoral degree (PhD) in condensed matter physics in 1966 from the University of Mumbai. Later, he was appointed as the director of Advanced Numerical Research and Analysis Group (ANURAG) of the Defence Research and Development Organisation (DRDO). After superannuation from government service, he served as the vice chancellor and honorary professor of the Sri Sathya Sai University.

Venkataraman, a distinguished professor of DRDO, has done advanced research in subjects such as neutron scattering, lattice dynamics, mechanical properties of matter, non-crystalline state, neutral networks and image processing. His contributions are reported in the design of Very Large Scale Integrated (VLSI) Circuits and its technology transfer. Apart from the scientific monographs like Dynamics of Perfect Crystals and Beyond the Crystalline State, he has also published several books such as, Journey into light: life and science of C.V. Raman, A Hot Story, Bhabha and His Magnificent Obsessions and Saha and His Formula. He is also a former member of the editorial board of Pramana, a reputed journal of Physics and has delivered several keynote addresses and lectures.

The Indian Academy of Sciences elected Venkataraman as their Fellow in 1974. The Indian National Science Academy followed suit by honouring him with elected Fellowship in 1977. He has also been a Jawaharlal Nehru Fellow (1984–86) and is a Fellow of the Materials Research Society of India. The Government of India awarded him the civilian honour of the Padma Shri in 1991. The same year, he received the Sir C. V. Raman Award of the University Grants Commission. The Indian National Science Academy awarded him the Indira Gandhi Prize for Popularisation of Science in 1994.

== See also ==
- Sri Sathya Sai University
- Bhabha Atomic Research Centre
- Indira Gandhi Centre for Atomic Research
- Advanced Numerical Research and Analysis Group
- Defence Research and Development Organisation

== Selected bibliography ==
- Ganeshan Venkataraman (1988). Journey into light: life and science of C.V. Raman. Indian Academy of Sciences. p. 570. ISBN 9788185324005.
- Ganeshan Venkataraman (1992). Bose and His Statistics. Universities Press. p. 126. ISBN 9788173710360.
- Ganeshan Venkataraman (1992). Chandrasekhar and His Limit. Universities Press. p. 134. ISBN 9780863113147.
- Ganeshan Venkataraman (1993). A Hot Story. Universities Press. p. 134. ISBN 9788173710100.
- Ganeshan Venkataraman (1994). Bhabha and His Magnificent Obsessions. Universities Press. p. 209. ISBN 9788173710070.
- Ganeshan Venkataraman (1995). Saha and His Formula. Universities Press. p. 194. ISBN 9788173710179.
- Ganeshan Venkataraman (1995). Raman and His Effect. Universities Press. p. 99. ISBN 9788173710087.
- Ganeshan Venkataraman (1997). Quantum revolution: Qed: the jewel of physics, Volume 2. Universities Press. p. 136. ISBN 9788173710032.
- Ganeshan Venkataraman (1997). Many Phases Of Matter. Universities Press. ISBN 9788173710346.
- Ganeshan Venkataraman (1994). What Is Reality?. Orient Blackswan. p. 137. ISBN 9780863114540.
- Ganeshan Venkataraman (1997). Why are Things the Way They Are?. Universities Press. p. 112. ISBN 9788173710339.
