= Naresh Dadhich =

Indian theoretical physicist (1944–2025)

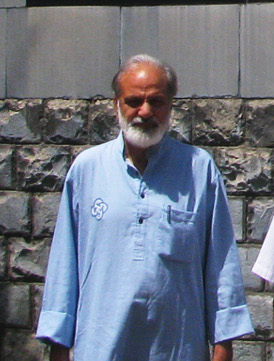
- Born: 1 September 1944
- Died: 6 November 2025 (aged 81); Beijing, China
- Education: Pune University
- Scientific career
- Fields: Quantum gravity
- Workplaces: Inter-University Centre for Astronomy and Astrophysics, Pune; Jamia Millia Islamia, Delhi
- Doctoral advisor: Vishnu Vasudev Narlikar

Naresh Dadhich (1 September 1944 – 6 November 2025) was an Indian theoretical physicist at Inter-University Center for Astronomy and Astrophysics (IUCAA). He was also the director of IUCAA until 31 August 2009. Dadhich held the M.A. Ansari Chair in Theoretical Physics at Centre for Theoretical Physics, Jamia Millia Islamia, Delhi from 2012 to 2016.

Dadhich became the director of IUCAA in July 2003. In 2012, he was a visiting faculty member at the University of KwaZulu-Natal at Durban, South Africa and also worked with gravity research groups in Portsmouth, United Kingdom and Bilbao, Spain.

His specialties included classical and quantum gravity and relativistic astrophysics. Along with his colleagues he published over 100 scientific papers and also supervised several PhD students.

Dadhich died on 6 November 2025, at the age of 81 in Beijing, China, where he was on an academic visit.
