= Wast Hills Observatory =

Astronomical observatory in England, part of the University of Birmingham

- Location: Birmingham, United Kingdom
- Coordinates: 52°23′14.8″N 1°56′39.1″W
- Altitude: 187.7 m (616 ft)
- Established: 1982
- Website: Wast Hills Observatory, University of Birmingham

Telescopes
- 408 mm Cassegrain: Main Telescope, Custom built
- 355 mm Cassegrain: Meade LX200R

The Wast Hills Observatory was established in 1982 primarily as a teaching laboratory for the Physics with Astrophysics BSc/MSci degree course at the University of Birmingham. It is located in Kings Norton, Birmingham, England, 8 km from the university campus. It has developed into a unique training and research facility for undergraduate and postgraduate students.

== List of directors ==
Kenneth Elliott	1982 - 2003
Somak Raychaudhury	2003 - 2012
Graham Smith	2012 - 2016
Sean McGee	2016 - 2021
Matt Nicholl	2021 - 2023
Ben Gompertz	2023 -
