= Sanjeev Dhurandhar =

Indian astronomer

- Scientific career
- Fields: Astrophysics
- Workplaces: Inter-University Centre for Astronomy and Astrophysics

Sanjeev Dhurandhar is professor at IUCAA, Pune. His research interest is detection and observation of Gravitational waves. Dhurandhar was part of the Indian team which contributed to the detection of gravitational waves. He is the science advisor to the IndIGO consortium council.

He was awarded one of the H K Firodia awards for 2016.

== See also ==
- LIGO
- INDIGO
- Jayant Narlikar
