= Ajit Kembhavi =

Indian astrophysicist (born 1950)

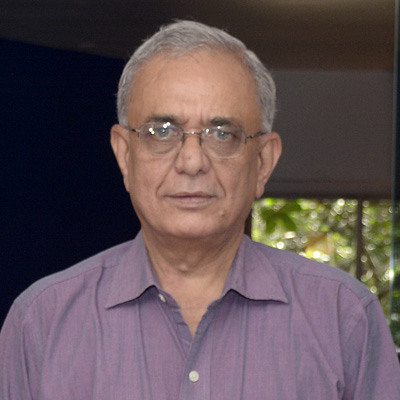
- Born: 16 August 1950 (age 76); Hubli, Karnataka, India
- Education: Tata Institute of Fundamental Research
- Scientific career
- Fields: Physics, astronomy, computer science
- Workplaces: Inter-University Centre for Astronomy and Astrophysics
- Doctoral advisor: Jayant Narlikar

Ajit Kembhavi (born 16 August 1950) is an Indian astrophysicist. He is presently a professor emeritus at the Inter-University Centre for Astronomy and Astrophysics, (IUCAA) at Pune, India, of which he was also a founder member. He also serves as a vice president of the International Astronomical Union. He is the Principal Investigator of Pune Knowledge Cluster along with Professor L. S. Shashidhara.

== Early life and career ==
Ajit Kembhavi was born in 1950 in Hubli in Karnataka and spent a major part of his childhood there. During his time spent at Hubli, Kembhavi was a neighbour to Gangubai Hangal, the well-known Indian classical musician. This helped Ajit acquire a keen taste in Indian classical music.

After his schooling and junior college education in Hubli, he moved to Mumbai to finish his BSc and MSc in physics from the Ruia college, affiliated to Bombay University. Later, he joined the Tata Institute of Fundamental Research (TIFR) for his PhD in physics with the renowned Indian astrophysicist and cosmologist Jayant Narlikar as his thesis supervisor.

Later, he moved to England to work as a postdoctoral fellow under Lord Martin Rees at the Institute of Astronomy, Cambridge. After this, he returned as a research fellow to his alma mater TIFR. In 1988, when IUCAA was formed, he joined as assistant professor, and later became the Dean of Visitor Programmes in 1997, a position he held for twelve years until 2009. He took up the directorship of IUCAA in 2009 and remained the director until 2014 before being succeeded by Somak Raychaudhury.

He was elected vice president of the IAU's Office of Astronomy for Development and also serves on the Space Commission of the Department of Space, India. He is the Principal Investigator of Pune Knowledge Cluster along with Professor L. S. Shashidhara.

== Contributions to Indian astronomy ==
Kembhavi has played a very significant role in the development of astronomy as a research area in India. As a Dean of Visitor Programmes in IUCAA, he was responsible for the growth and sustenance of several programs held in IUCAA and across India, for promotion of astronomical research. As a director of IUCAA, he played a lead role in cementing India's participation in several international projects including the Southern African Large Telescope (SALT), Thirty Meter Telescope (TMT), and the Laser Interferometer Gravitational-Wave Observatory LIGO).

He also conceived and executed the INFONET project under the University Grants Commission (India), which brought the benefits of information and communication technology to all universities in India including enabling electronic access to thousands of journals.

A notable contribution by Ajit Kembhavi is in setting up of the Virtual Observatory's India chapter, a project funded by the Ministry of Communications and Information Technology. The Virtual Observatory project enables standardization of methods of access and descriptions of astronomical data sets enabling ease of access to open astronomical data sets. He also served as the chairman of the International Virtual Observatory Alliance (IVOA) which oversees Virtual Observatory activities internationally.

Kembhavi is also a well-known science popularizer and has given several public talks and presentations for promoting astronomy among the masses. He has also written a Marathi book 'Nabhaat Hasre Taare' co-authored by Jayant and Mangala Narlikar.

== Areas of research ==
Kembhavi's areas of expertise largely include gravitation theory, extragalactic astronomy and astronomical database management. His contributions include:

- Gravity: Elucidating nature of cosmological singularities under conformal transformations (done as a part of his PhD thesis)
- Quasars: Estimation of quasars to the X-ray background.
- X-Ray Binaries: Study of the tidal capture formation of globular cluster X-ray binaries, and their subsequent evolution millisecond and other pulsars
- Pulsars: Pulsar magnetic field decay from a comparison between observed data and simulations
- Galaxies: Quantitative study of galaxy morphology, scaling relations etc.
- Warm Absorbers: Comprehensive high resolution X-ray spectral study of warm absorbers in Seyfert galaxies observed with ESA's X-ray observatory XMM-Newton, theoretical modelling using photo-ionisation code CLOUDY, understanding the effect of ionizing continuum shape on the properties of warm absorbers, and stability curve analysis of the warm absorbers.

== Personal life ==
Ajit Kembhavi is married to Asha Kembhavi, a bio-technologist. They have a son Annirudh Kembhavi, who works at the Allen Institute of Artificial Intelligence.

== Honours, awards and memberships ==
- Fellow of the National Academy of Sciences
- Fellow of the Indian Academy of Sciences
- Former president of the Astronomical Society of India ()
- A Vice President of the International Astronomy Union (2016–present)
- Former president of the Indian Association of General Relativity and Gravitation
- Recipient of the UGC Hari Om Vats award for academic interaction with Society (2004)
- Raja Ramana Fellowship (2017)
- Former chairman of the governing board of the Consortium for Educational Communication (CEC), New Delhi
- Member of the governing council and court of the Indian Institute of Science, Bangalore
- Member of the Space Commission of India
- Chairman of the governing council of the Indian Institute of Astrophysics, Bangalore

== Books ==
- Highlights in Gravitation and Cosmology. Eds. B.R. Iyer, A. Kembhavi, J.V. Narlikar & C.V. Vishveshwara, 1988. Cambridge University Press, Cambridge.
- Non Standard Cosmology (Revised Edition). J.V. Narlikar & A.K. Kembhavi, 1988. In Galaxies & Cosmology, Eds. V.M. Canuto & B.G. Elmegreen. Gorden & Breach.
- Gravitation and Cosmology. Eds. S. Mukherjee, A.R. Prasanna & A.K. Kembhavi, 1992. Wiley Eastern.
- Starbursts : Triggers, Nature and Evolution. (Proc. of Les Houches School), 1998. Eds. B. Guiderdoni & A.K. Kembhavi. Springer.
- Quasars and Active Galactic Nuclei - An Introduction. A.K. Kembhavi & J.V. Narlikar. 1999. Cambridge University Press, Cambridge.
- The Universe - Visions and Perspectives. Eds. N. Dadhich & A.K. Kembhavi, 2000. Kluwer.
- Nabhat Hasare Taare: A book on Astrophysics of stars in Marathi. A.K. Kembhavi, J. V. Narlikar & Mangala Narlikar. Rajhans Prakashan 2008. A Gujarati translation of this book has been published.
