= Vishnu Vasudev Narlikar =

Indian physicist

Vishnu Narlikar

Chairman, Rajasthan Public Service Commission
- In office 1 August 1960 – 31 July 1966
- Field: Physics, astronomy
- Institutions: Banaras Hindu University; University of Poona
- Preceded by: L. L. Joshi
- Succeeded by: R. C. Choudhary

Personal details
- Born: Vishnu Vasudev Narlikar; 26 September 1908 Kolhapur, Bombay Presidency, British India
- Died: 1 April 1991 (aged 82)
- Education: University of Mumbai; Cambridge University

Vishnu Vasudev Narlikar FRAS (26 September 1908 – 1 April 1991) was an Indian physicist specializing in general relativity. He is considered "the doyen of General Relativity in India." The Centre for Theoretical Physics, Jamia Millia Islamia has instituted the annual "V. V. Narikar Memorial Lecture" in memory of him.

== Personal life ==
Narlikar was born in Kolhapur, India on 26 September 1908. His father Vasudevshastri Narlikar was a pandit in Sanskrit and delivered pravachans. Vishnu was the youngest among three brothers. He studied at the Vidyapeeth High School and Rajaram College in Kolhapur. Vishnu continued with his education despite his father's demise and secured the fourth rank in the Matriculation exam. He won scholarships and studied at the Elphinstone College and Royal Institute of Science in Mumbai. He stood first in the B.Sc. exam. Upon receiving his B.Sc. degree from the University of Mumbai in 1928, Narlikar continued studies at the Cambridge University in England, where he passed the Mathematics Tripos in 1930.

His studies at Cambridge were sponsored by the J. N. Tata Endowment Scholarship. He also received a loan from the Kolhapur State, with a condition that he would be employed with the Kolhapur State upon his return to India. Vishnu Narlikar became a Star Wrangler after completing the Mathematical Tripos at Cambridge University. He was also a recipient of the Isaac Newton Studentship and the Rayleigh Prize.

In 1932, Narlikar married Shridevi Navare of Mumbai, but she died due to illness within few years. He then married Krishna (née Sumati) Huzurbazar, sister of V. S. Huzurbazar, in 1937.

Vishnu and Sumati had two sons, the astrophysicist Jayant and scientist Anant.

== Career ==
He returned to India in 1932 as a professor of Mathematics and Head of the Department of Mathematics at the Banaras Hindu University in Varanasi at the age of 24. Madan Mohan Malaviya, the founder of the Banaras Hindu University, repaid the debt which Narlikar owed to the Kolhapur State, thereby making it possible for Narlikar to work at the university. He became a professor of mathematics at the University of Poona in 1966 and retired in 1973. From 1960 to 1966, he served as the chairman of the Rajasthan Public Service Commission. He was elected a fellow of the Royal Astronomical Society in 1931. He served as the president of the Indian Mathematical Society from 1981 to 1982.

He trained the first generation of general relativists in India. His Ph.D. students include Prahalad Chunnilal Vaidya, Amal Kumar Raychaudhuri, Naresh Dadhich, and Aragam R. Prasanna.
