= Raghunathan Srianand =

Indian cosmologist, astrophysicist and a scientist

- Born: February 1, 1969 (age 57); India
- Known for: Studies on redshift evolution on the cosmic microwave background radiation
- Awards: 2008 Shanti Swarup Bhatnagar Prize
- Scientific career
- Fields: Cosmology
- Institutions: Inter-University Centre for Astronomy and Astrophysics
- Website: Homepage

Raghunathan Srianand (born February 1, 1969) is an Indian cosmologist, astrophysicist and a scientist at the Inter-University Centre for Astronomy and Astrophysics (IUCAA). Known for his research on redshift evolution on the cosmic microwave background radiation, Srianand is a member of the International Astronomical Union and the Perimeter Institute for Theoretical Physics.

Focusing his work on observational and theoretical astrophysics, he is known to have assisted in widening the understanding of the bounds on the variation of fundamental constants using the absorption line spectra of quasars. High-z proto-galaxies, time and space variation of fundamental constants, redshift evolution of the CMB temperature and formation and evolution of IGM have been some of the areas of his research. His studies have been documented by way of a number of articles (Note: Please see Selected bibliography section) and Google Scholar, an online article repository of scientific articles, has listed 306 of them. The Council of Scientific and Industrial Research, the apex agency of the Government of India for scientific research, awarded him the Shanti Swarup Bhatnagar Prize for Science and Technology, one of the highest Indian science awards, for his contributions to physical sciences in 2008. (Note: Long link - please select award year to see details)

== Selected bibliography ==
- S. Muzahid, Jane C. Charlton, Daisuke Nagai, Joop Schaye, R. Srianand (2017). "Discovery of an HI-rich Gas Reservoir in the Outskirts of SZ-effect Selected Clusters". The Astrophysical Journal. 846 (1): L8. arXiv:1708.02600. Bibcode:2017ApJ...846L...8M. doi:10.3847/2041-8213/aa8559. S2CID 118943294.
- R. Dutta, R. Srianand, Neeraj Gupta, Ravi Joshi (2017). "H i 21-cm absorption from z ∼ 0.35 strong Mg ii absorbers". Monthly Notices of the Royal Astronomical Society. 468 (1): 1029–1037. arXiv:1703.00457. Bibcode:2017MNRAS.468.1029D. doi:10.1093/mnras/stx538. S2CID 119069958.
- M. Vivek, R. Srianand, N. Gupta (2015). "Transient C IV Broad Absorption Lines in radio detected QSOs". Monthly Notices of the Royal Astronomical Society. 455 (1): 136–149. arXiv:1509.08471. Bibcode:2016MNRAS.455..136V. doi:10.1093/mnras/stv2240. S2CID 118700592.

== See also ==
- Redshift-space distortions
