= Vidyapeeth Highschool Kolhapur =

Vidyapeeth High School, Kolhapur is a Marathi school located in Kolhapur, Maharashtra, India. Vidyapeeth has the merit of having many students on the State Merit List year after year. The school was started in 1917 by Shri. Tophkhane-guruji is on a land donated by the King of Kolhapur, Chhatrapati Shahu Maharaj. The land that was previously used as his stable. Since then, the school has produced many notable alumni in different fields. The school is located next to the Mahalaxmi Temple in Kolhapur and also has land outside the city in Tapovan. Rana Thakur Yeshwantsinh (Yeshwant) Kelavkar was appointed by the Late Sh. Ch. Shahu Maharaj of Kolhapur is the first founding Principal; therefore, in his remembrance and for his outstanding contributions to the school's development, 19 January is celebrated as Kelavkar Din (Day) every year.
