= Sulabha K. Kulkarni =

Indian physicist

Sulabha Kashinath Kulkarni
- Born: 1 June 1949 (age 77); Pune, Maharashtra, India
- Citizenship: India
- Education: University of Pune
- Known for: Nanotechnology; Materials Science; Surface Science
- Scientific career
- Fields: Nanotechnology; Materials Science; Surface Science
- Workplaces: Indian Institute of Science Education and Research, Pune

Sulabha Kashinath Kulkarni (born 1 June 1949) is an Indian physicist, whose research spans the areas of Nanotechnology, Materials Science, and Surface Science. She is currently a visiting faculty member at Indian Institute of Science Education and Research, Pune, India.

== Early life and education ==
Born in 1949, Kulkarni was educated in Pune and earned her Bachelor of Science (1969), Master of Science (1971), and Doctor of Philosophy (1976) in Physics from the University of Pune. From 1976 to 1977, she conducted her post-doctoral research on gas/solid interactions using surface science techniques in the Physics Department (E20) at the Technical University of Munich, Germany.

== Work and career ==
Kulkarni joined as a faculty member in the Department of Physics at the University of Pune upon her return to India. She continued to research and teach for 32 years, also introducing a course on Nanotechnology at the post-graduate level. In March 2009, she joined the Indian Institute of Science Education and Research (IISER) in Pune and continued as a UGC scientist. From 2010 to 2011, she served as Pro Vice Chancellor at the Banasthali University, Rajasthan. She returned to IISER Pune as UGC Professor and is currently a Visiting Faculty at IISER Pune.

== Awards and honors ==
- Associate editor, Journal of Nanophotonics (2011–)
- Fellow (FNA), Indian National Science Academy (New Delhi) (2011–)
- Bharatiya Stree Shakti "Women and Technological Innovation National Award" (2007)
- Associate editor, International Journal of Nanoscience & Nanotechnology (2006–)
- Fellow (FASc), Indian Academy of Science (Bangalore) (2004–)
- Fellow (FNASc), National Academy of Sciences, India (Allahabad), (2003–)
- Elected President, IPA Pune Chapter (1996–1998)
- Fellow, Maharashtra Academy of Sciences (1995–)
