= Inter-University Centre for Astronomy and Astrophysics =

Institute for astronomical sciences in Pune, India

Inter University Center for Astronomy and Astrophysics
- Type: Government of India research institution under the University Grants Commission (UGC)
- Established: 1988
- Director: R. Srianand
- Location: Pune, Maharashtra, India
- Campus: Urban
- Website: www.iucaa.in

The Inter-University Centre for Astronomy and Astrophysics (IUCAA) is an autonomous institution set up by the University Grants Commission of India to promote nucleation and growth of active groups in astronomy and astrophysics in Indian universities. IUCAA is located in the University of Pune campus next to the National Centre for Radio Astrophysics, which operates the Giant Metrewave Radio Telescope. IUCAA has a campus designed by Indian architect Charles Correa.

== History ==
After the founding of the Giant Metrewave Radio Telescope (GMRT) by Prof. Govind Swarup, a common research facility for astronomy and astrophysics was proposed by Dr. Yash Pal of the planning commission. Working on this idea, astrophysicist Prof. Jayant Narlikar, along with Ajit Kembhavi and Naresh Dadhich set up IUCAA within the Pune University campus in 1988.

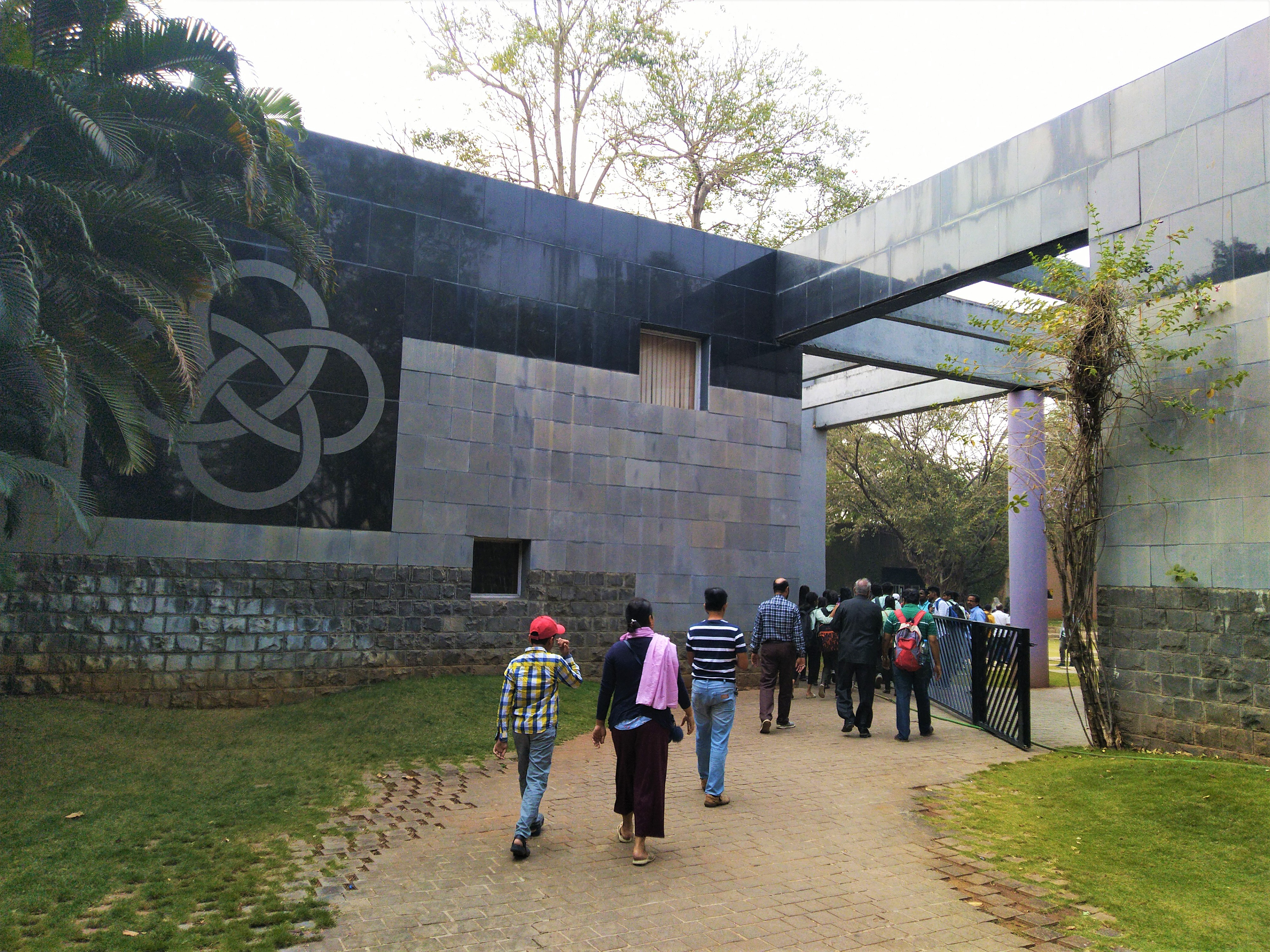
Entrance to the campus of IUCAA

In 2002, IUCAA initiated a nationwide campaign to popularize astronomy and astrophysics in colleges and universities. IUCAA arranged visitor programs for universities in Nagpur (Maharashtra), Thiruvalla (Kerala), Siliguri (West Bengal) and others, along with a tie-up with the Ferguson college, Pune.

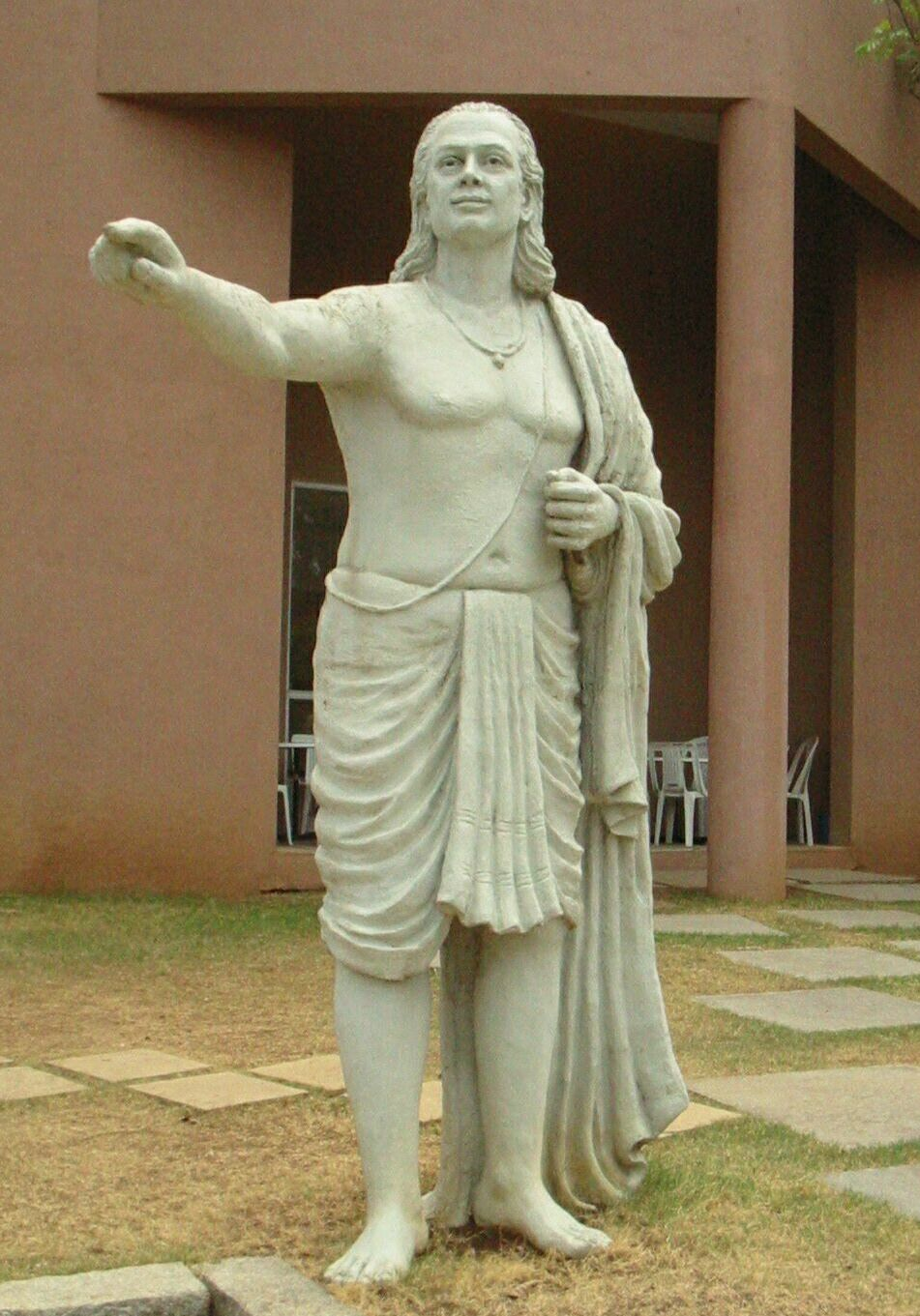
Statue of Aryabhata on the grounds of IUCAA, Pune

In 2004, IUCAA set up the Muktangan Vidnyan Shodhika (Exlporatorium), a science popularization initiative, with a grant from the Pu La Deshpande foundation. The center is open to all school students from Pune. IUCAA was declared the nodal center for India to coordinate the year-long celebrations for the International Year of Astronomy.

IUCAA was headed for its first decade by Prof. Jayant Narlikar, followed by Prof. Naresh Dadhich and Prof. Ajit Kembhavi. From September 2015, the Director is Prof. Somak Raychaudhury.

== Research ==
Scientists at IUCAA carry out research in a wide range of areas in astronomy, astrophysics and physics. IUCAA has active research groups in fields like classical and quantum gravity, cosmology, gravitational waves, optical and radio astronomy, Solar System physics and instrumentation.

=== Facilities ===
IUCAA, along with Persistent Systems, Pune, operates the Virtual Observatory project. The observatory provides users access to raw observational data along with advanced processing software designed by engineers at Persistent.

IUCAA also maintains Girawali Observatory which is about 80 km from Pune city, off Pune-Nasik Road and near the historical Junnar town. In addition to catering to the needs of astronomers in general, this observatory is unique in setting aside a certain amount of time specifically for training as well as observational proposals arising from Indian Universities. The telescope has a primary mirror of diameter 2 meter, f/3 and a secondary of 60 cm, f/10. IUCAA Faint Object Spectrograph & Camera (IFOSC) is the main instrument available on the telescope's direct Cassegrain port currently.

IUCAA, along with the Raman Research Institute and Indian Institute of Astrophysics, Bangalore, declared a proposal to take a ten percent stake in the Large Telescope Project, which would allow Indian astronomers access to major upcoming observatories such as the Giant Magellan Telescope (GMT), the Thirty Meter Telescope (TMT) and the European Extremely Large Telescope (EELT).

== Science popularization ==
The SciPop initiative was set up by Prof. Jayant Narlikar along with N. C. Rana and Arvind Paranjpe. SciPop, based out of the Muktangan Vidnyan Shodhika building, provides educational facilities for school students, teachers and amateur astronomers. IUCAA organizes the open Science day program every year on 28 February, in which members of the general public can visit the institute to take a look at ongoing research and contemporary work happening elsewhere in the world. IUCAA was one of the few Indian research institutes to start a science popularization program, and other organisations such as the Indian Institute of Science, Indian Institute of Astrophysics, and TIFR, Mumbai started similar public outreach programmes in the wake of its success.

== People ==
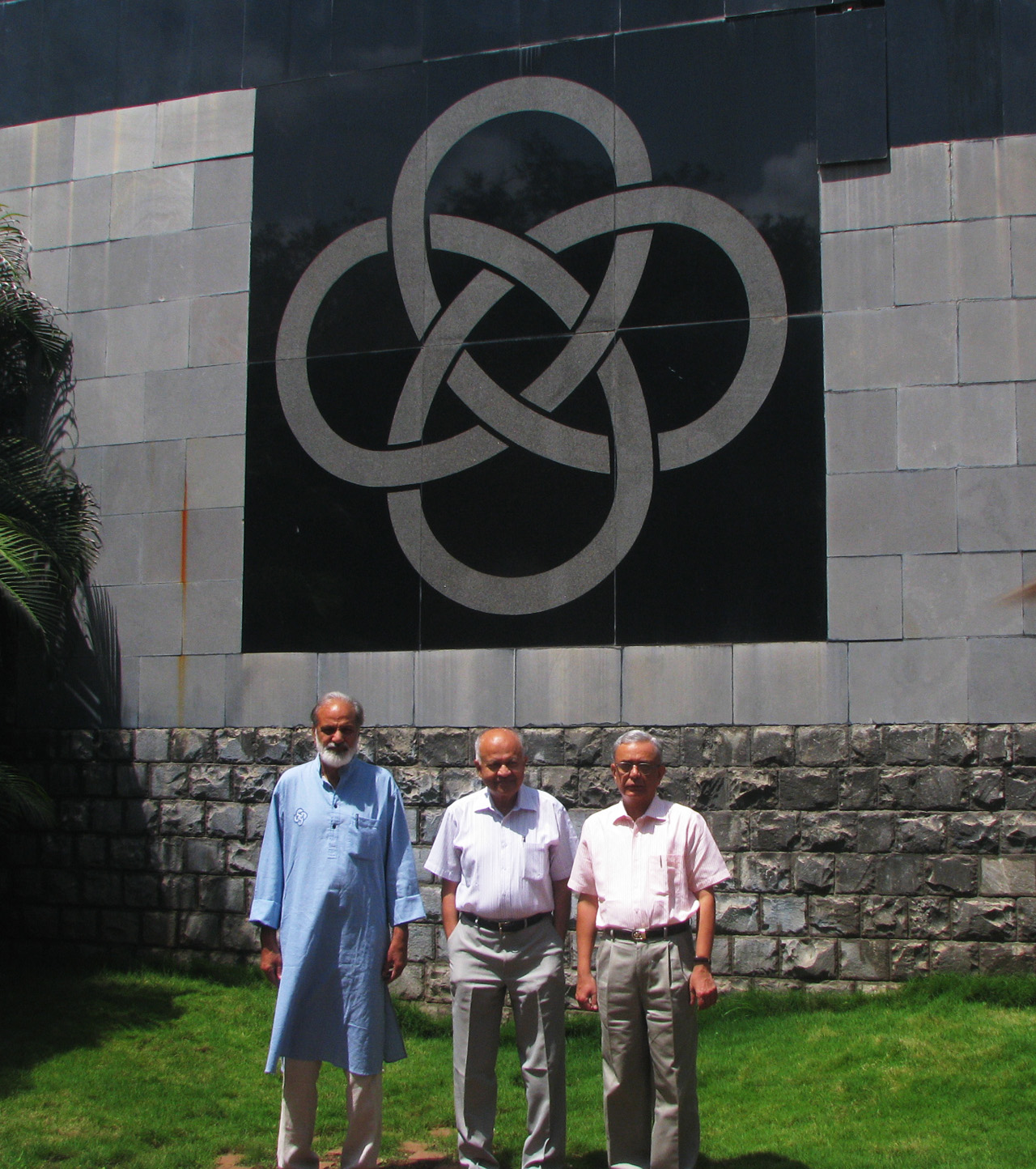
Three of the founder members and ex-directors of IUCAA, Pune

Notable people associated with IUCAA:

- Jayant Narlikar, founding director
- Naresh Dadhich, physicist, Fellow of the Indian Academy of Sciences, 2nd Director
- Ajit Kembhavi, 3rd Director
- Thanu Padmanabhan, Padma Shri award-winning astrophysicist
- Somak Raychaudhury, 4th Director
- Sanjeev Dhurandhar, gravitational-wave physicist and science advisor to the IndIGO consortium
- Raghunathan Srianand, astrophysicist and Shanti Swarup Bhatnagar laureate
- Kanak Saha, astrophysicist and Shanti Swarup Bhatnagar laureate.
- Surhud More, astrophysicist and Vigyan Yuva-Shanti Swarup Bhatnagar Award recipient.

== Logo ==
The logo of IUCAA is a symmetric 8-crossing Carrick mat knot, and a mirror image to that of the International Guild of Knot Tyers.

== See also ==
- Girawali Observatory
- List of astronomical societies
