= Surhud More =

Indian astrophysicist

- Awards: Otto Hahn Medal (2010); Vigyan Yuva-Shanti Swarup Bhatnagar Award (2025)
- Scientific career
- Fields: Astrophysics
- Institutions: IUCAA
- Website: www.iucaa.in/en/faculty-research/surhud

Surhud More is an Indian astrophysicist. He is a professor of astrophysics at the Inter-University Centre for Astronomy and Astrophysics. His research interests include galaxy formation, large scale structure, weak gravitational lensing, supernovae and cosmology. The Government of India awarded him the Vigyan Yuva-Shanti Swarup Bhatnagar Award for his contributions to Physics in 2025.

== Education ==
Surhud More did his Ph.D. from the Max Planck Institute for Astronomy. He was a project researcher at Kavli Institute for the Physics and Mathematics of the Universe.

== Awards ==
In 2010, More was awarded the Otto Hahn Medal by the Max Planck Society for this work on dark matter halos. In 2025, he was awarded the Vigyan Yuva-Shanti Swarup Bhatnagar Award in physics for his outstanding contributions in physics.
