= Kanak Saha =

Indian astrophysicist

- Born: Cooch Behar, West Bengal
- Education: Scottish Church College (BSc); Banaras Hindu University (MSc); Indian Institute of Science (PhD)
- Awards: S.S. Bhatnagar Prize (2021)
- Scientific career
- Fields: Astrophysics
- Workplaces: IUCAA
- Website: web.iucaa.in/~kanak/

Kanak Saha is an Indian astrophysicist. He is a professor of astrophysics at Inter-University Centre for Astronomy and Astrophysics. His research interests include formation of galaxies in the early universe and their evolution. The Council of Scientific and Industrial Research, the apex agency of the Government of India for scientific research, awarded him the Shanti Swarup Bhatnagar Prize for Science and Technology for his contributions to physical sciences in 2021.

== Early life and education ==
Kanak Saha was born on 4 February 1977 in Cooch Behar, West Bengal. Saha graduated from Scottish Church College in 1998 with a B.Sc. in physics. He did his M.Sc. from Banaras Hindu University in 2001. He earned his Ph.D. in 2008 from Indian Institute of Science.

== Awards ==
In 2021, Saha was awarded the Shanti Swarup Bhatnagar Prize for Science and Technology in the physical sciences category for his breakthrough discovery of a faint galaxy at high redshift using Astrosat. The following year, Saha became a laureate of the Asian Scientist 100 by the Asian Scientist.
