= Indian Initiative in Gravitational-wave Observations =

Gravitational wave observatory unit, india

Ligo
- Alternative names: LIGO-India
- Location: India
- Coordinates: 19°36′45″N 77°01′57″E
- Website: www.gw-indigo.org
- Location within India

Finalized construction site for LIGO India

INDIGO or IndIGO (Indian Initiative in Gravitational-wave Observations) is a consortium of Indian gravitational wave physicists. It is an initiative to set up advanced experimental facilities for a multi-institutional observatory project in gravitational-wave astronomy to be located near Aundha Nagnath, Hingoli District, Maharashtra, India. Predicted date of commission is in 2030.

Since 2009, the IndIGO Consortium has been planning a roadmap for gravitational-wave astronomy and a phased strategy towards Indian participation in realizing a gravitational wave observatory in the Asia-Pacific region. IndIGO is the Indian partner (along with the LIGO Laboratory in the US) in planning the LIGO-India project, a planned advanced gravitational-wave detector to be located in India, whose concept proposal is now under active consideration by the science funding agencies in India and US. The LIGO Laboratory, in collaboration with the U.S. National Science Foundation and Advanced LIGO partners from the U.K., Germany and Australia, has offered to provide all of the designs and hardware for one of the three planned Advanced LIGO detectors to be installed, commissioned, and operated by an Indian team of scientists in a facility to be built in India. A site near Aundha Nagnath in the Hingoli District, Maharashtra has been selected. In April 2023, the Cabinet of India approved the project to build the advanced gravitational-wave detector in Maharashtra at an estimated cost of Rs 2,600 crore. The facility's construction is expected to be completed by 2030.

== Activities ==
The IndIGO Consortium has spearheaded the proposal for the LIGO-India gravitational wave observatory, in association with the LIGO laboratory in US. In addition to the LIGO-India project, the other activities of IndIGO involve facilitating international collaborations in gravitational-wave physics and astronomy, initiating a strong experimental gravitational-wave research program in India, training of students and young scientists, etc.

The observatory will be operated jointly by IndIGO and LIGO and would form a single network along with the LIGO detectors in the U.S. and Virgo in Italy. The design of the detector will be identical to that of the Advanced LIGO detectors in the U.S.

== Purpose ==
The major purpose of IndIGO is to set up the LIGO-India detector, which would help enhance the network of gravitational wave detectors worldwide. The network includes the two LIGO detectors in the US (in Hanford and Livingston), the Virgo and GEO600 detectors in Europe, and the KAGRA detector in Japan. By simultaneous detection of the same event on these multiple detectors, a precise location in the sky can be pinpointed for the source of the detected waves. For example, the first detected gravitational waves by LIGO could only pinpoint the location of the black hole merger source to a broad area of the southern hemisphere sky. Using triangulation, this location information could be improved if the signal was detected on more than two detectors. Another important goal of IndIGO is to train scientists for successfully operating the LIGO-India detector, when commissioned. Previous studies have shown that a detector operational in India would improve source localization significantly, by an order of magnitude or more, depending on the region of the sky.

== Funding ==
The additional funding required to operate the LIGO-India detector was under consideration by the Government of India under the aegis of its Department of science and technology (DST) and Department of atomic energy (DAE). The U.S National Science Foundation agreed to the relocation of one of the Hanford detectors (L2) to LIGO-India provided that the additional funding required to house the detector in India would have to be sponsored by the host country.

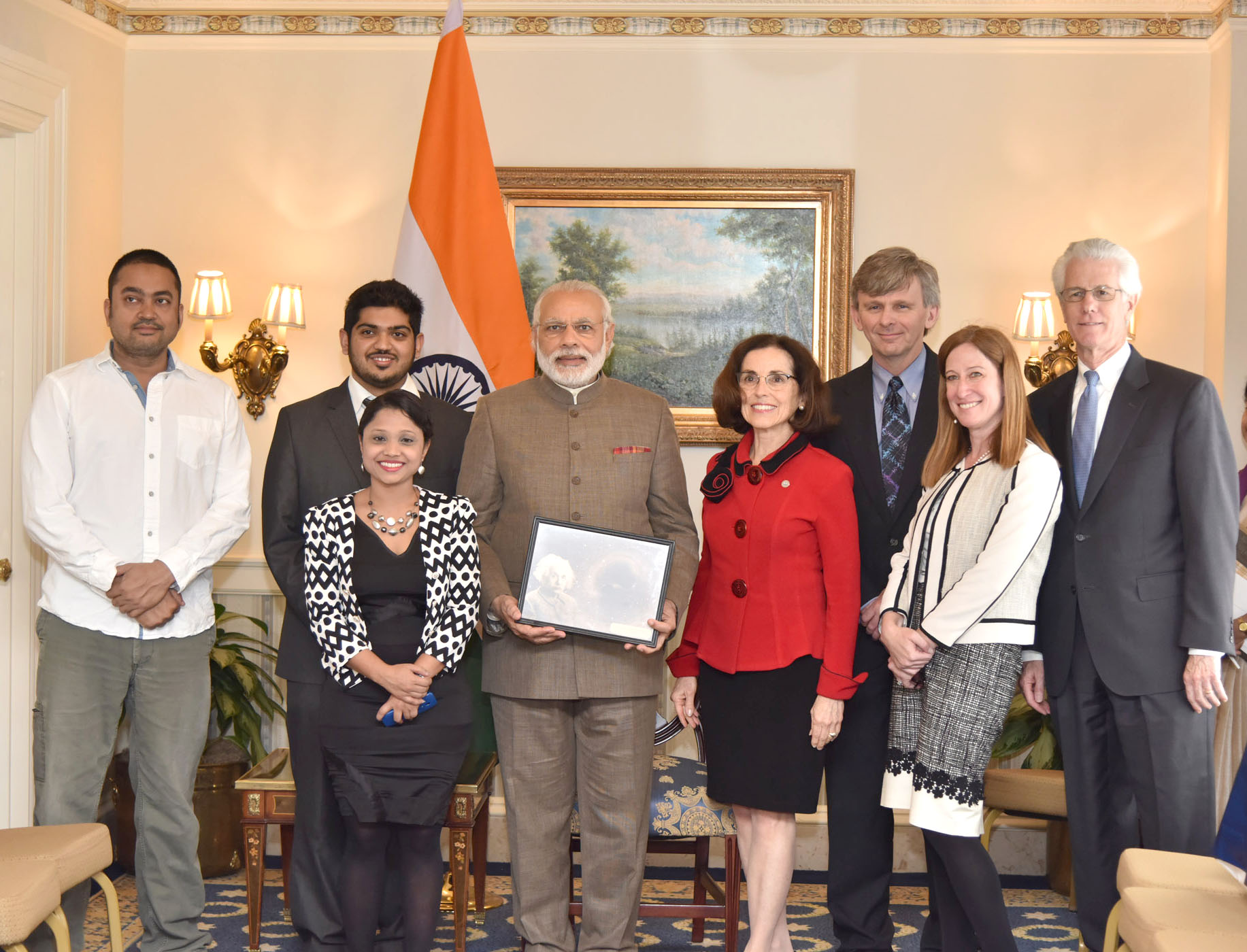
LIGO-India MoU Signing Ceremony

On 17 February 2016, less than a week after LIGO's announcement about the detection of gravitational waves, Indian Prime Minister Narendra Modi announced that the Cabinet had granted 'in-principle' approval to the LIGO-India mega science proposal. The Indian gravitational-wave detector would be only the sixth such observatory in the world and will be similar to the two US detectors in Hanford, Washington and Livingston, Louisiana. A Memorandum of Understanding (MoU) was signed on 31 March 2016 between the Department of Atomic Energy and Department of Science & Technology in India and the National Science Foundation of the US to develop the observatory in India.

As of July 2021, the project was expected to cost INR 1,200 Crores, and was contingent on 'full approval' by the Cabinet of the Government of India. In April 2023, full approval for the project was granted to build the advanced gravitational-wave detector in Maharashtra, at an estimated cost of Rs 2,600 Crores. The facility's construction is expected to be completed by 2030.

In a joint statement in June 2023, President Joe Biden and Prime Minister Narendra Modi "welcomed the commencement of construction of a Laser Interferometer Gravitational-Wave Observatory (LIGO) in India."

== Organization and membership ==
The three lead institutions in the IndIGO consortium are: Institute of Plasma Research (IPR), Inter-University Centre for Astronomy and Astrophysics (IUCAA), and Raja Ramanna Centre for Advanced Technology (RRCAT).

IndIGO has currently over 70 member scientists. Bala Iyer of the Raman Research Institute is the chairperson and Tarun Souradeep of the Inter-University Centre for Astronomy and Astrophysics is the Spokesperson. The international advisory committee is chaired by theoretical physicist Abhay Ashtekar and has members from several international as well as Indian research institutions. IndiGO is a member of the LIGO Scientific Collaboration.

== See also ==
- List of astronomical observatories
- Sanjeev Dhurandhar
