= K. S. Babu =

Indian researcher

Kaladi Sankaran Babu
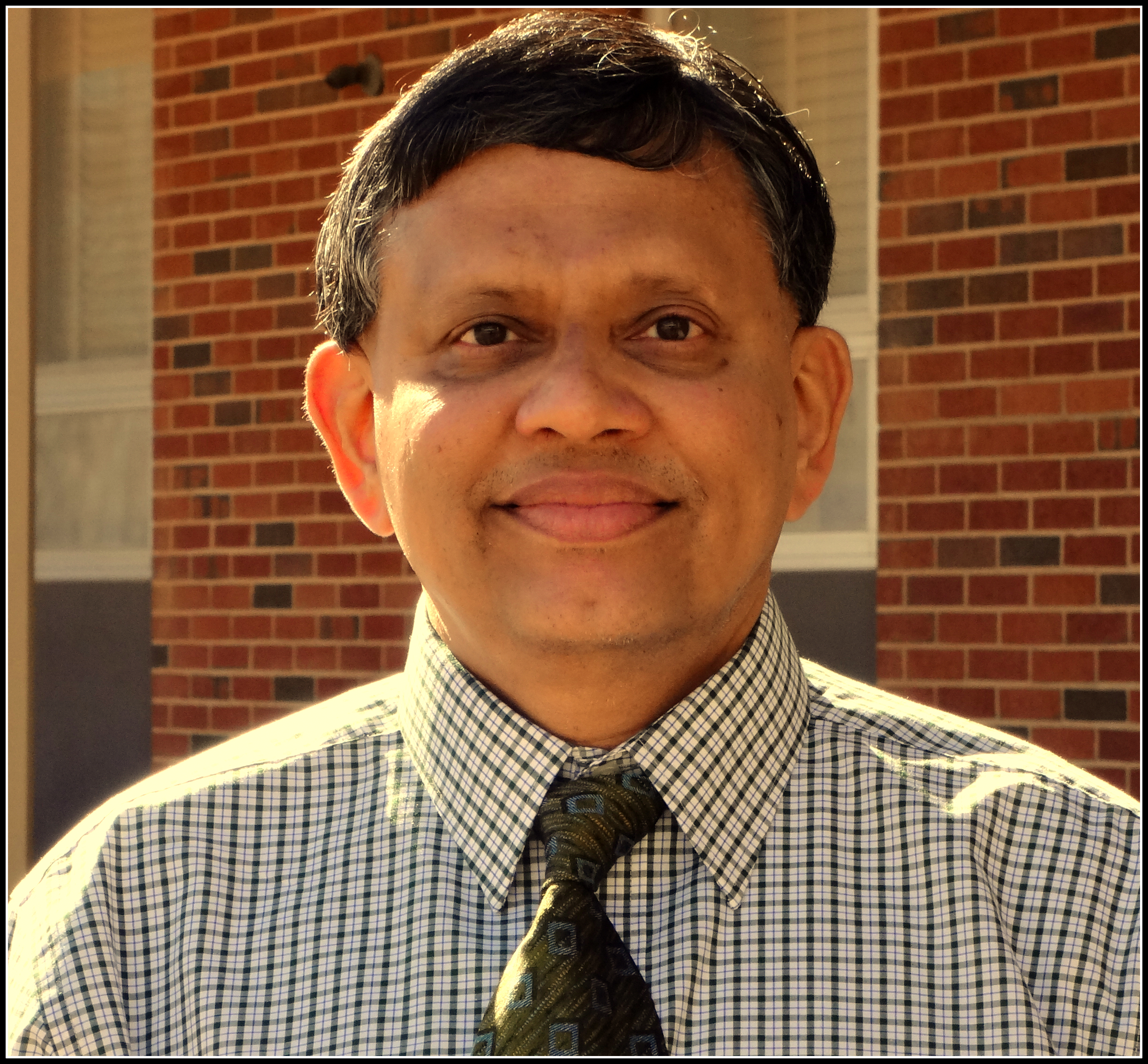
- Born: Kerala, India
- Citizenship: India
- Known for: Model-building and phenomenological aspects of physics beyond the Standard Model, Neutrino mass generation, Grand Unified Theory, Zee–Babu model, Baryon Number Violation
- Scientific career
- Fields: Particle physics
- Workplaces: Fermilab, Oklahoma State University
- Doctoral advisor: Ernest Ma

Kaladi S. Babu is a theoretical physicist, regents professor and interim head of the Department of Physics at Oklahoma State University. He received his PhD in 1986 from the University of Hawaii, under the supervision of Ernest Ma.

== Awards ==
Babu is a Fellow of the American Physical Society and holds a Regents Professorship at Oklahoma State. He is one of three theoretical physicists named as a 2017 Distinguished Scholar by the Fermi National Accelerator Laboratory, or Fermilab, the largest particle accelerator facility in the United States.

== Interests ==
Babu's research interests are primarily in the model-building and phenomenological aspects of physics beyond the Standard Model. He has been involved in studies of grand unified theories and nucleon decay.

Babu is a key member of the neutrino theory community, having proposed several testable models of neutrino masses. His 1988 paper on two-loop generation of neutrino masses (the so-called Zee–Babu model) provides an alternative to high scale seesaw mechanism, and is well cited in the literature. He and Ed Kearns convened the Baryon Number Violation subgroup of the "Snowmass" 2013 Community Planning Study. He has helped organize the Center for Theoretical Underground Physics (CETUP) series of international conferences on neutrino physics in Lead, South Dakota.

== Publications ==
Babu has written over 200 scientific articles, which have received over 12,500 citations (excluding the biennial PDG Review of Particle Physics). His "Renowned" publications include a 1988 paper on Majorana neutrino masses and a 2002 paper on $A_4$-symmetric neutrino masses.
