= Shashi P. Karna =

Indian nanotechnology physicist (born 1956)

Shashi P. Karna (born 1956) is a nanotechnology physicist who works for the United States Army Research Laboratory in Aberdeen, Maryland.

In 2006, he was honored as a Fellow of the American Physical Society.

== Educational background ==
Karna, born in 1956 in Bihar, India, obtained his Ph.D. in 1983 and an M.Sc. in 1976 in chemistry from Banaras Hindu University. He holds a B.Sc. degree in mathematics, physics, and chemistry from Bhagalpur University in India, earned in 1973. Karna has a large publication record, with over 300 articles to his name, including technical papers, conference proceedings, reviews, and book chapters. He has co-edited several books, such as "DoD Applications of Nanomaterials."

== Career ==
Karna holds the position of senior research scientist (ST) specializing in nano-functional materials at the Army Research Laboratory, Weapons & Materials Research Directorate, located in Aberdeen Proving Ground, Maryland. Within his role, he led the ARL Nanoscience Strategic Technical Initiative from 2006-08 and been involved in various leadership positions. These include serving as the chair for the nanotechnology area at the Army Science Conference, the American Physical Society Symposium on Molecular Electronics, the American Chemical Society Symposium on Non-linear Optical Materials, and the Materials Research Society Symposium on Optical Materials, among others. Karna has contributed as a technical program committee member for the Institute of Electrical and Electronics Engineers (IEEE) NANO. He serves as the chair of the NATO Sensors and Electronics Technology Research Technical Group on "Smart Textiles" and holds advisory roles in academic institutions such as Michigan Technological University and the University at Buffalo. Karna is an adjunct professor at Michigan Technological University and Morgan State University.

== Books authored and co-authored ==
- Nonlinear Optical Materials
- Defense Applications of Nanomaterials
- Nonlinear Optical Materials: Theory and Modelling
- Organic and Nanocomposite Optical Materials: 2004 MRS Fall Meeting Symposium Proceedings, Vol. 846

== Articles ==
- Karre, P. Santosh Kumar; Bergstrom, Paul L.; Mallick, Govind; Karna, Shashi P. (27 July 2007). "Room temperature operational single electron transistor fabricated by focused ion beam deposition". Journal of Applied Physics. 102 (2): 024316. doi:10.1063/1.2761837. ISSN 0021-8979.
- Gowtham, S.; Scheicher, Ralph H.; Ahuja, Rajeev; Pandey, Ravindra; Karna, Shashi P. (2 July 2007). "Physisorption of nucleobases on graphene: Density-functional calculations". Physical Review B. 76 (3) 033401. arXiv:0704.1316. doi:10.1103/PhysRevB.76.033401.
- He HY, Pandey R, Karna SP, Electronic structure mechanism of spin-polarized electron transport in a Ni-C-60-Ni system, Chemical Physics Letters 439 (1–3): 110–114 4 May 2007
- Dunlap BI, Karna SP, Zope RR, Dipole moments from atomic-number-dependent potentials in analytic density-functional theory, Journal of Chemical Physics 125 (21): Art. No. 214104 7 December 2006
- Pineda AC, Karna SP, (Hyper)polarizabilities of isolated GaN nanoclusters, Chemical Physics Letters 429 (1–3): 169–173 29 September 2006
- He HY, Pandey R, Karna SP, Theoretical study of molecule mediated spin-polarized electron tunneling between magnetic materials, Chemical Physics Letters 428 (4–6): 411–415 20 September 2006
- He, Haiying; Pandey, Ravindra; Pati, Ranjit; Karna, Shashi P. (9 May 2006). "Spin-polarized electron transport of a self-assembled organic monolayer on a Ni(111) substrate: An organic spin switch". Physical Review B. 73 (19) 195311. doi:10.1103/PhysRevB.73.195311.
- Lau KC, Pandey R, Pati R, et al., Theoretical study of electron transport in boron nanotubes, Applied Physics Letters 88 (21): Art. No. 212111 22 May 2006
- Lastella S, Mallick G, Woo R, et al., Parallel arrays of individually addressable single-walled carbon nanotube field-effect transistors, Journal of Applied Physics 99 (2): Art. No. 024302 15 January 2006
- Pati R, Pineda AC, Pandey R, et al., Ab initio quantum chemical study of electron transfer in carboranes, Chemical Physics Letters 406 (4–6): 483–488 2 May 2005

== Professional memberships and affiliations ==
- Fellow, American Physical Society, 2006
- Fellow, United States Army Research Laboratory
- Fellow, The Optical Society, 2004
- Senior Member, Institute of Electrical and Electronics Engineers, Elected 2000
- Member, American Chemical Society
- Member, American Association for the Advancement of Science
