= Somak Raychaudhury =

Indian astrophysicist

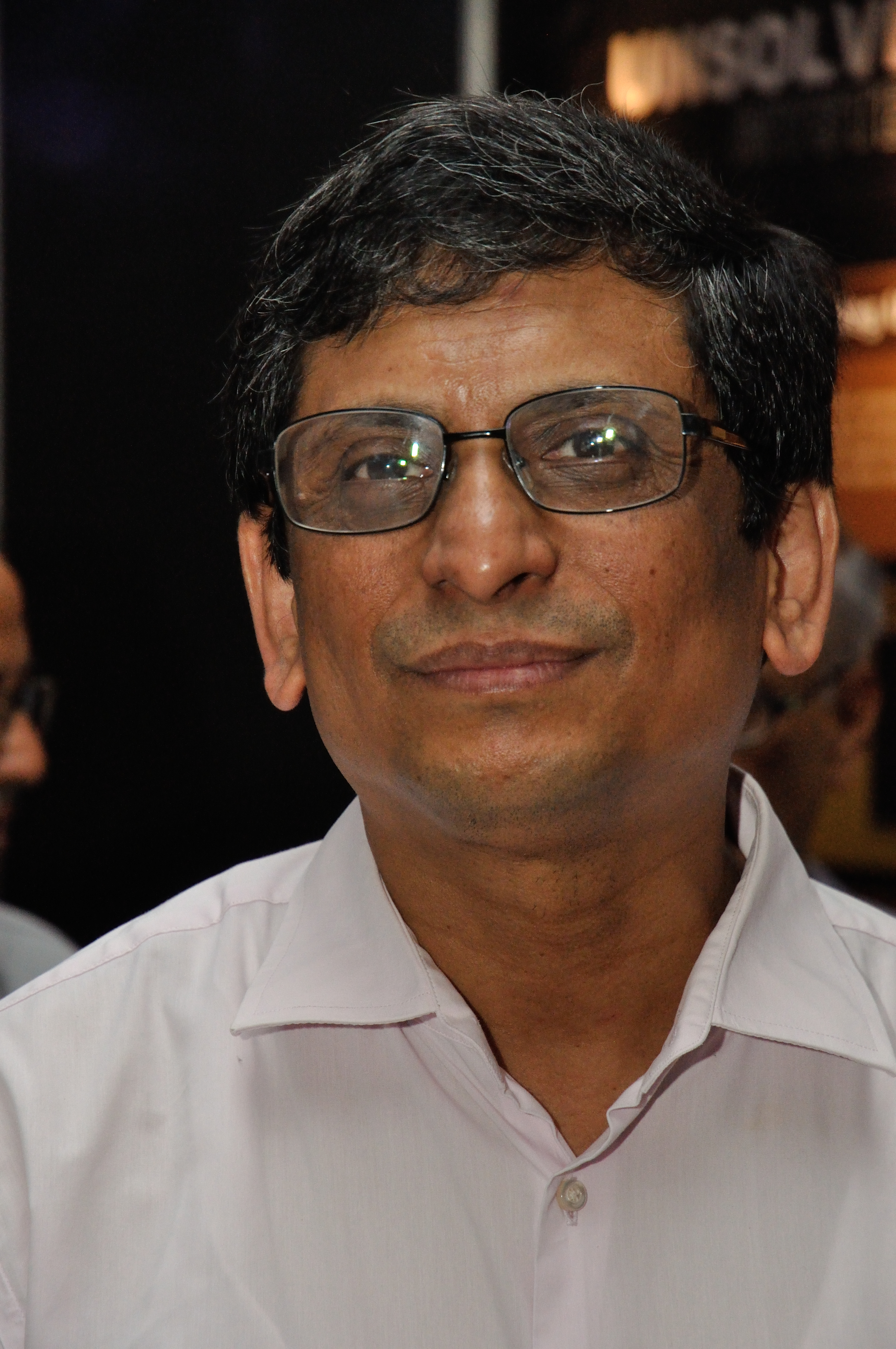
- Raychaudhury in February 2015
- Born: 1964 (age 61–62); Calcutta, West Bengal, India
- Education: University of Cambridge; Churchill College, Cambridge; University of Oxford; Trinity College, Oxford; Presidency College, Calcutta; University of Calcutta
- Scientific career
- Fields: Astrophysics; Cosmology
- Workplaces: Ashoka University; Presidency University, Kolkata; University of Birmingham
- Doctoral advisor: Donald Lynden-Bell

Somak Raychaudhury (Bengali: সোমক রায়চৌধুরী) (born 1964) is an Indian astrophysicist. He served as the Vice-Chancellor at Ashoka University and was the Director of the Inter-University Centre for Astronomy and Astrophysics (IUCAA), Pune. He is on leave from Presidency University, Kolkata, India, where he is a Professor of Physics, and is also affiliated to the University of Birmingham, United Kingdom. He is known for his work on stellar mass black holes and supermassive black holes. His significant contributions include those in the fields of gravitational lensing, galaxy dynamics and large-scale motions in the Universe, including the Great Attractor.

== Education ==
Somak Raychaudhury was born in Kolkata (then Calcutta), India. He attended St Xavier's Collegiate School, Kolkata, from which he ranked second in the Madhyamik examination of the West Bengal Board of Secondary Education, 1977. He then studied at St Xavier's College, Kolkata, from which he placed second in the state in the Higher Secondary Examination of the West Bengal Council of Higher Secondary Education. He attended Presidency College, Calcutta, where he completed his BSc degree in Physics in 1983. He then went to complete a BA degree in Physics at Trinity College, Oxford, University of Oxford, supported by an Inlaks Scholarship from the Inlaks Shivdasani Foundation, where he won a Douglas Sladen Essay prize. He then proceeded to obtain a PhD in Astrophysics from the University of Cambridge, United Kingdom, as a member of Churchill College, Cambridge, in 1990, supported by an Isaac Newton Studentship. Here, he was a recipient of a Smith's Prize (J.T. Knight Prize) in 1988. The subject of his doctoral thesis, supervised by Donald Lynden-Bell, FRS, was "Gravity, Galaxies and the 'Great Attractor' Survey".

== Career ==
Somak Raychaudhury became the fourth Director of the Inter-University Centre for Astronomy and Astrophysics (IUCAA), Pune India, in September 2015. He was Professor and Head of Physics at Presidency University, Kolkata, where he was also the Dean of the Faculty of Natural and Mathematical Sciences till August 2015. He remains affiliated to the Astrophysics and Space Research group, School of Physics and Astronomy, University of Birmingham, where he used to be the director of the Wast Hills Observatory for the period 2003–2012. Before this, he was a member of the faculty at the Inter-University Centre for Astronomy and Astrophysics, Pune, India. He was a staff member at the Center for Astrophysics | Harvard & Smithsonian, in Cambridge, Massachusetts, working for the Chandra X-ray Observatory. Before this, He was a Smithsonian postdoctoral fellow at the Center for Astrophysics | Harvard & Smithsonian, and a tutor at Lowell House, Harvard University. Following his PhD, he was a SERC Research Fellow at the Institute of Astronomy, at the University of Cambridge, Cambridge, and a resident Junior Research fellow at St. Edmund's College, University of Cambridge.

Raychaudhury's research interests lie in the study of the evolution of galaxies in groups and clusters, and on the supercluster filaments of the cosmic web. He has used optical, X-ray, radio, infrared and ultraviolet observations to understand how the transformations of galaxies are related to their local and global environment. He is involved in developing machine learning algorithms for Astronomical data mining. He has published over 80 research papers in peer-reviewed scientific journals on these themes. In addition, he leads a substantial outreach programme involving school students, teachers and the general public. He was one of the key people to start the Indian Astronomy Olympiad, and selected and coached the Indian Olympiad team to top results at the International Astronomy Olympiad in 1999 and 2000 . His outreach activities include numerous programmes on radio, television and collaboration with performing artists.

He is a member of the International Astronomical Union, a Fellow of the Royal Astronomical Society, and a Fellow of the European Astronomical Society. He is a Life Member of the Astronomical Society of India, and was an elected member of its Executive Council during 1998–2000.

== Selected publications ==
- Raychaudhury, Somak (1989). "The distribution of galaxies in the direction of the 'Great Attractor'". Nature. 342 (6247): 251–255. Bibcode:1989Natur.342..251R. doi:10.1038/342251a0. S2CID 4354365.
- Raychaudhury, Somak; Lynden-Bell, D. (1989). "Tides, torques and the timing argument". Monthly Notices of the Royal Astronomical Society. 240 (2): 196–218. Bibcode:1989MNRAS.240..195R. doi:10.1093/mnras/240.2.195.
- Raychaudhury, Somak; A. C. Fabian; A. C. Edge; C. Jones; et al. (1991). "X-ray and optical observations of the Shapley supercluster in Hydra-Centaurus". Monthly Notices of the Royal Astronomical Society. 248: 101–111. Bibcode:1991MNRAS.248..101R. doi:10.1093/mnras/248.1.101.
- Lahav, O.; Naim, A.; Buta, R.; Raychaudhury, Somak; et al. (1995). "Galaxies, Human Eyes, and Artificial Neural Networks". Science. 267 (5199): 859–62. arXiv:astro-ph/9412027. Bibcode:1995Sci...267..859L. doi:10.1126/science.267.5199.859. PMID 17813914. S2CID 43370373.
- Saini, Tarun Deep; Raychaudhury, Somak; Sahni, Varun & Starobinsky, Alexei (2000). "Reconstructing the Cosmic Equation of State from Supernova Distances". Phys. Rev. Lett. 85 (6): 1162–1165. arXiv:astro-ph/9910231. Bibcode:2000PhRvL..85.1162S. doi:10.1103/PhysRevLett.85.1162. PMID 10991502. S2CID 26864228.
- Miles, T. A.; Raychaudhury, Somak; Forbes Duncan, D. A. (2004). "The Group Evolution Multiwavelength Study (GEMS): bimodal luminosity functions in galaxy groups". Monthly Notices of the Royal Astronomical Society. 355 (3): 785–793. arXiv:astro-ph/0408554. Bibcode:2004MNRAS.355..785M. doi:10.1111/j.1365-2966.2004.08356.x. S2CID 13960641.
- Raychaudhury, Somak (2005). "And Gamow said, let there be a hot universe". Resonance. 10 (12): 220–231. doi:10.1007/BF02835146. S2CID 121280264.
- Porter, Scott C.; Raychaudhury, Somak; Pimbblet, Kevin A. & Drinkwater, Michael J. (2008). "Star formation in galaxies falling into clusters along supercluster-scale filaments". Monthly Notices of the Royal Astronomical Society. 388 (3): 1152–1160. arXiv:0804.4177. Bibcode:2008MNRAS.388.1152P. doi:10.1111/j.1365-2966.2008.13388.x. S2CID 17619275.
- Mahajan, Smriti; Haines, Chris; Raychaudhury, Somak (2010). "Star formation, starbursts and quenching across the Coma supercluster". Monthly Notices of the Royal Astronomical Society. 404 (4): 1745–1760. arXiv:1002.0004. Bibcode:2010MNRAS.404.1745M. doi:10.1111/j.1365-2966.2010.16432.x. S2CID 118550760.
- O'Sullivan, Ewan J.; Giacintucci, Simona; P. David, Laurence; Gitti, Myriam; et al. (2011). "Heating the Hot Atmospheres of Galaxy Groups and Clusters with Cavities: The Relationship between Jet Power and Low-frequency Radio Emission". Astrophysical Journal. 735 (1): 11. arXiv:1104.2411. Bibcode:2011ApJ...735...11O. doi:10.1088/0004-637X/735/1/11. S2CID 119184861.
- Burke, Mark J.; Raychaudhury, Somak; et al. (2012). "A Transient Sub-Eddington Black Hole X-Ray Binary Candidate in the dust Lanes of Centaurus A". Astrophysical Journal. 749 (2): 112. arXiv:1202.3149. Bibcode:2012ApJ...749..112B. doi:10.1088/0004-637X/749/2/112. S2CID 49949444.
