= ICTP Prize =

Award for advancements in physics

The International Centre for Theoretical Physics Prize (ICTP Prize) is an annual award given by the ICTP Scientific Council since 1982. It is given to outstanding and original contributions in physics by young scientists from, and working in, developing countries. The prize includes a sculpture, certificate and a cash award.

== Winners ==
Year	Recipients
2024	Enzo Tagliazucchi
2024	Ranjan Laha
2023	Mohit Kumar Jolly
2023	Xinan Zhou
2022	Shant Baghram
2022	Mohammad Hossein Namjoo
2021	Rondrotiana Barimalala
2021	Narendra Ojha
2020	Dibyendu Roy
2020	Mehdi Kargarian
2019	Basudeb Dasgupta
2019	Suvrat Raju
2018	Luis E. F. Foa Torres
2018	Hongjun Xiang
2017	Emilio Kropff
2016	Aninda Sinha
2015	Aijun Ding and
2015	Vijayakumar S. Nair
2014	Pablo Cornaglia
2013	Yasaman Farzan
2013	Patchanita Thamyongkit
2012	Pablo Mininni
2011	Ado Jorio
2010	Shiraz Minwalla
2009	Marcelo Barreiro
2008	Abhishek Dhar
2008	Zhong Fang
2007	M.M. Sheikh-Jabbari
2006	Rajesh Gopakumar
2005	Xiaohua Zhu
2004	B. Gabriel Mindlin
2003	Manindra Agrawal
2002	Mohit Randeria
2001	Soo-Jong Rey
2000	Sheng-Li Tan
2000	T. N. Venkataramana
1999	Daniel Domínguez
1998	Anamaría Font
1998	Fernando Quevedo
1997	Nitin Nitsure
1996	A. M. Jayannavar
1995	Spenta R. Wadia
1994	Chao-Jiang Xu
1993	Deepak Dhar
1992	Elcio Abdalla
1991	Hong Van Le
1990	José L. Morán-López
1989	Ashoke Sen
1988	José Onuchic
1987	Abdullah Sadiq
1986	Li Jia Ming
1985	Chike Obi
1984	Ricardo Galvão
1983	Ganapathy Baskaran

Source: ICTP Prize Official website

== See also ==
- Abdus Salam International Centre for Theoretical Physics (ICTP)
