= Suvrat Raju =

Indian physicist

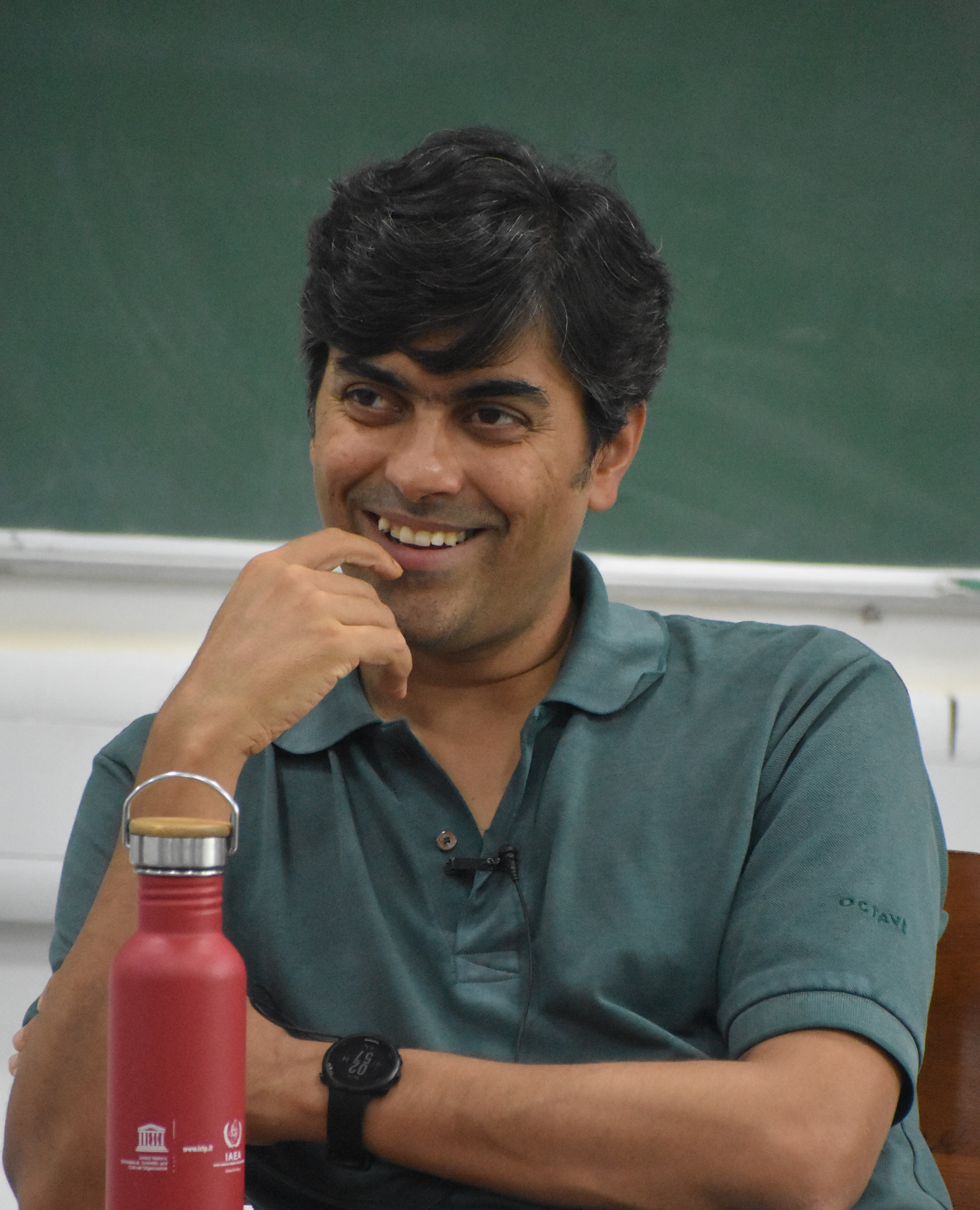
- Suvrat at IIT Gandhinagar in 2024
- Education: St Stephen's College, Delhi; Delhi University; Harvard University
- Scientific career
- Thesis: Supersymmetric partition functions in the AdS/CFT conjecture (2008)
- Doctoral advisor: Shiraz Minwalla

Suvrat Raju is an Indian physicist. He is known for his work on black holes. He was awarded the 2019 ICTP Prize and the 2022 Nishina Asia award.

== Research ==
Raju advanced a potential resolution of the black hole information paradox, which is based on the idea that "all the information inside a black hole can be recovered from outside" in quantum gravity. Together with Kyriakos Papadodimas, Raju formulated the Papadodimas-Raju proposal for black holes Raju was part of a collaboration that proposed the utility of the Mellin transform in AdS/CFT arguing that it provided a "natural language" for correlation functions. Raju was part of a collaboration that developed an "index" for quantum field theories with super-conformal symmetry.

== Career ==
Raju studied physics at St. Stephen's College in Delhi University from 1999 to 2002. He earned his PhD at Harvard University in 2008. He is currently a professor at the International Centre for Theoretical Sciences of the Tata Institute of Fundamental Research.

== Awards and honours ==
- 2022 Nishina Asia award for "his original and influential insights into the resolution of the black hole information paradox and the principle of holography in quantum gravity."
- 2020 Asian Scientist 100
- 2019 ICTP Prize "for new insights into the holographic description of black-hole interiors, for clarifying the nature of subtle non-local effects in quantum gravity, and for contributions to the study of the AdS/CFT correspondence."
- 2017 Swarnajayanti Fellowship
- 2015 Smt. Saraswathi Cowsik medal
- 2013 Indian National Science Academy medal for young scientists
- 2013 National Academy of Sciences of India young scientist award

== Selected publications ==
- Raju, Suvrat (12 January 2022). "Lessons from the information paradox". Physics Reports. 943: 1–80. arXiv:2012.05770. doi:10.1016/j.physrep.2021.10.001. ISSN 0370-1573. S2CID 228083488.
- Papadodimas, Kyriakos; Raju, Suvrat (October 2013). "An infalling observer in AdS/CFT". Journal of High Energy Physics. 2013 (10): 212. arXiv:1211.6767. Bibcode:2013JHEP...10..212P. doi:10.1007/JHEP10(2013)212. S2CID 53650802.
- Fitzpatrick, A. Liam; Kaplan, Jared; Penedones, Joao; Raju, Suvrat; van Rees, Balt C. (November 2011). "A Natural Language for AdS/CFT Correlators". Journal of High Energy Physics. 2011 (11): 95. arXiv:1107.1499. doi:10.1007/JHEP11(2011)095. ISSN 1029-8479. S2CID 15959358.
- Kinney, Justin; Maldacena, Juan; Minwalla, Shiraz; Raju, Suvrat (8 August 2007). "An Index for 4 dimensional Super Conformal Theories". Communications in Mathematical Physics. 275 (1): 209–254. arXiv:hep-th/0510251. doi:10.1007/s00220-007-0258-7. ISSN 0010-3616. S2CID 14349615.

== Public advocacy ==
Raju criticized aspects of the Indo-U.S. nuclear deal arguing, with M. V. Ramana, that the Indian nuclear liability bill favored foreign nuclear corporations and that the nuclear reactors that the Indian government was planning to import were expensive. Raju was part of a team of scientists that released a report on the protests at Hyderabad central University in 2016 that was critical of the actions of the university administration. Raju was part of a group of scientists who argued that the 2019 Indian Citizenship (Amendment) Act was discriminatory.
