= Ricardo Galvão =

Brazilian physicist and engineer

Ricardo Magnus Osório Galvão
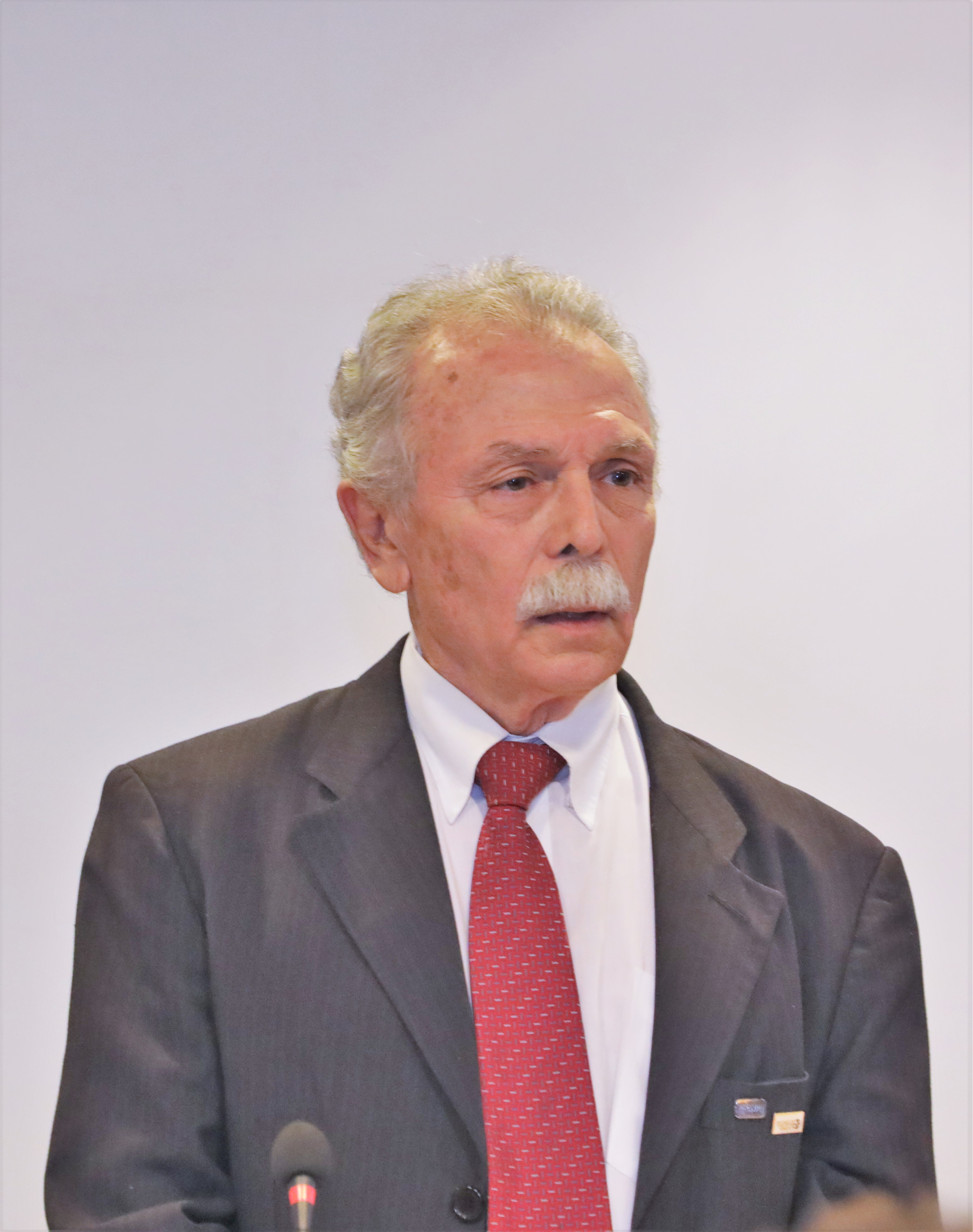

Federal Deputy
- Incumbent
- Assuming office TBD
- Constituency: São Paulo

Personal details
- Born: 21 December 1947 (age 78) Itajubá, Minas Gerais, Brazil
- Party: REDE (2022–present)
- Scientific career
- Education: List: Fluminense Federal University (graduation in TE); Unicamp (masters in electrical engineering); MIT (doctorate in applied plasma physics)
- Awards: ICTP Prize (1984), National Order of Scientific Merit, Carneiro Felippe Medal (2015)
- Fields: Plasma physics
- Workplaces: University of São Paulo, Centro Brasileiro de Pesquisas Físicas, University of Campinas
- Thesis: Non-Circular Cross-Section Tokamaks (1975)
- Doctoral advisor: Bruno Coppi

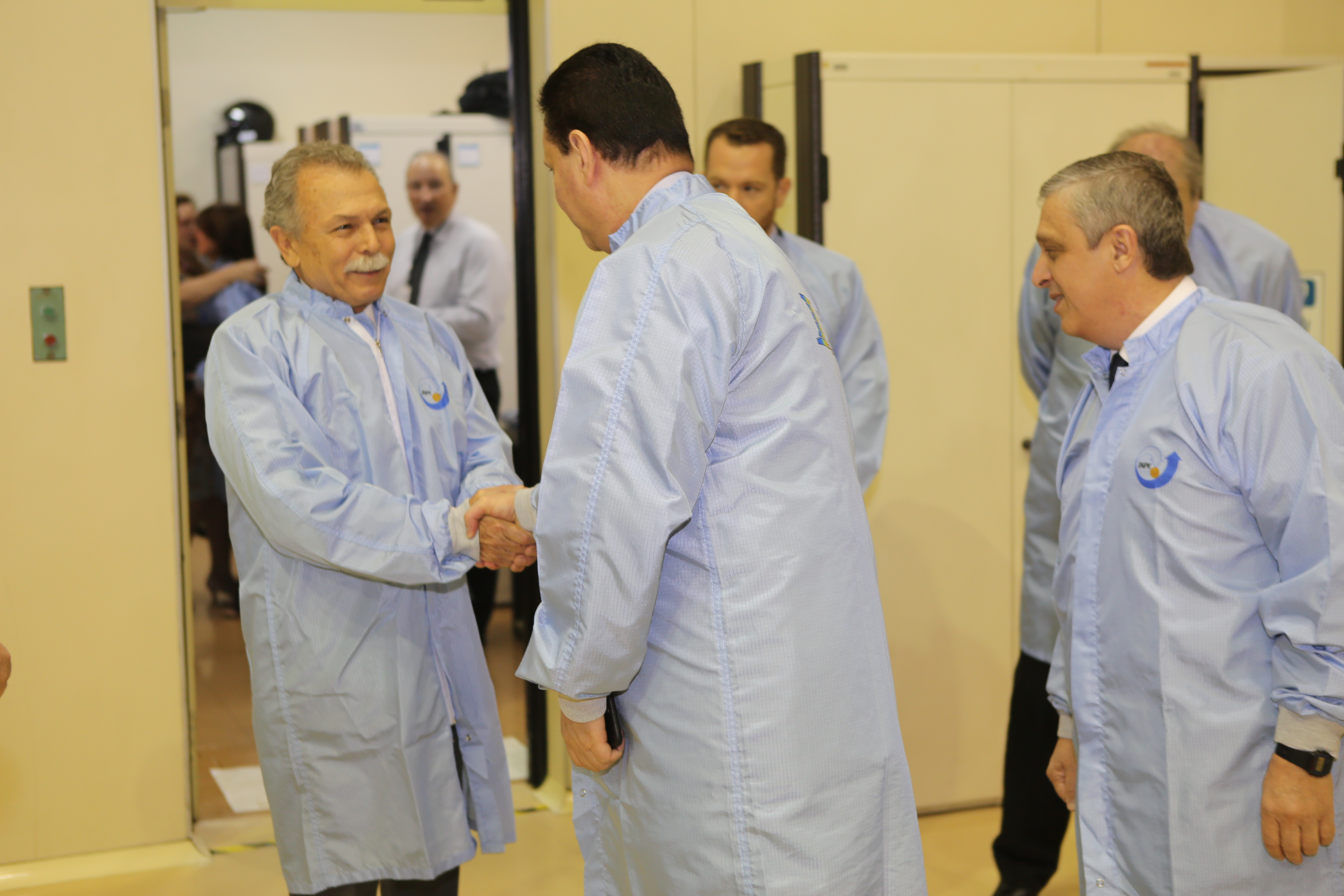
Galvão and then minister Gilberto Kassab in 2016.

Ricardo Magnus Osório Galvão (born 21 December 1947) is a prominent Brazilian physicist and engineer, formerly the Director-General of the National Institute for Space Research. He is a full Professor of the Institute of Physics of the University of São Paulo, member of the Brazilian Academy of Sciences, fellow of the Institute of Physics and councilman of the European Physical Society. Galvão has occupied major positions within the Brazilian Physics community such as the presidency of the Brazilian Physical Society (2013–2016) and the directorship of the Brazilian Center for Research in Physics (2004–2011).

Galvão's research is primarily devoted to plasma physics and thermonuclear magnetic fusion. He served as a board member for Plasma Physics and Controlled Fusion (1995–2005) and headed the Plasma Physics Laboratory of the University of São Paulo (2000–2016), where he oversaw the operation of the TCABR tokamak.

In August 2019, he was removed from his position as Director-General of the National Institute for Space Research, after a public disagreement with President Jair Bolsonaro over scientific data that showed a significant increase in deforestation in the Amazon rainforest since the latter took office.

== Biography ==
He graduated in Telecommunications Engineering from Universidade Federal Fluminense in 1969. He obtained a master's degree in Electrical Engineering from the State University of Campinas in 1972 and a PhD in Plasma Physics from the Massachusetts Institute of Technology in 1976.

He was director of the Brazilian Centre for Physics Research (CBPF) between 2004 and 2011 and president of the Brazilian Physical Society between 2013 and 2016. A full professor at the University of São Paulo, Galvão is a researcher at the USP's Plasma Physics Laboratory, where he conducts research in the area of nuclear fusion with the TCABR tokamak.

He was a professor at Unicamp from 1971 to 1982 and at the University of São Paulo since 1983, where he is currently a full professor. In parallel, he also worked as a researcher for the Aerospace Technical Centre from 1982 to 1986. In 1981 he also worked, inside USP, together with Ivan Nascimento, in the construction of TBR-1, the first tokamak in Latin America, which was functional until 1995.

From 2005 to 2012 he was director of the Brazilian Centre for Physics Research (CBPF).

In 2016 he took over as head of the National Institute for Space Research. Following his exoneration in 2019, Galvão returned to teaching at the Institute of Physics at USP.

== Awards ==
In 1984 Galvão received the ICTP Prize from the International Centre for Theoretical Physics in Trieste, Italy, for his theoretical contributions in magnetohydrodynamic equilibrium and stability, resistive modes and laser interaction with matter. In 2008 he was admitted to the Class of Commander of the National Order of Scientific Merit and in 2015 received the Carneiro Felippe Medal.

== Friction with Jair Bolsonaro ==
On Friday, 19 July 2019, the president Jair Bolsonaro publicly criticized Ricardo Galvão during a news conference with the international press, accusing him of giving lying data about Amazon deforestation and being in the service of some NGO: "The issue of Inpe, I have the conviction that the data are liers. I even sent to see who is the guy who is in front of Inpe. He will have to come explain here in Brasília this data there that passed to the press worldwide, which our feeling does not match the truth. It even seems that he is at the service of some NGO, which is very common." The Ministry of Science even built a group to survey Ricardo Galvão's life, in order to see any things he "did wrong," as a way to force him to resign, as well as having his phone tapped.

On Saturday, Galvão countered the criticism made by the president:

The first thing I can say is that mr. Jair Bolsonaro needs to understand that a President of the Republic cannot speak in public, especially at a press conference, as if he were in a botequim conversation. He made inappropriate and unsubstantiated comments and made unacceptable attacks not only on me, but on people working for the science of this country. He said he was convinced that Inpe's data are a lie. More than offensive to me, it was very offensive to the institution. (...) I was really upset, because in my opinion he played with me the same game he did with Joaquim Levy (who resigned from BNDES after also being criticized in public by Bolsonaro). He has taken a pusillanimous, cowardly attitude to make a public statement perhaps hoping I will resign, but I will not. I hope he calls me to Brasília to explain the data and that he has the courage to repeat, looking face to face in my eyes. I am a 71-year-old gentleman, a member of the Brazilian Academy of Sciences, I will not accept such an offense. He who has the courage to face up to what he is doing. It's a botequim offense. I will not answer him and he is the one who should call me personally and also should have the courage to tell me that face to face.

— Ricardo Galvão

On the same day, the board of the Brazilian Society for the Advancement of Science defended Galvão in a manifesto that classified Bolsonaro's attacks as offensive, ideological and without foundation. On Sunday, the Brazilian Physics Society issued a note also supporting Galvão and deploring the attacks made by the president. Still on the 21st, the Brazilian Academy of Sciences and its president, Luiz Davidovich, also expressed support for Galvão, as did former Minister of Science and Technology José Israel Vargas. On 22 July, Galvão received expressions of support from the 56 scientists who make up the Science and Society Coalition, of Science and Technology Forum Entities and physicist Luiz Pinguelli Rosa. Galvão reaffirmed his previous statements and although he would not respond to the note of minister Marcos Pontes for not knowing its content and would meet with the minister before replying. He further stated that he had already contacted the minister. On 7 August 2019, Ricardo Galvão's dismissal was published.

Douglas Morton, director of the Biosphere Sciences Laboratory at NASA's Space Flight Center, said INPE's results were "unquestionable," explained that INPE had always worked in a technical and judicious manner and classified Galvão's dismissal as significantly alarming and reflected as "current government treats science. The official deforestation data issued by the Real-Time Deforestation Detection System (DETER) confirmed INPE's accuracy.

For his defence of science against Bolsonaro's attacks, the scientific journal Nature named Galvão as one of 2019's ten most important people in science. In 2021 the American Association for the Advancement of Science awarded Galvão the Scientific Freedom and Responsibility Award.

== Political career ==
In 2022 Ricardo Galvão joined the REDE party with the goal of running for a seat as a federal deputy for São Paulo in the 2022 elections, and received support from former President Lula. Galvão is also part of the Engaged Scientists movement.

On October 2, 2022, Ricardo Galvão ran for federal deputy for the state of São Paulo, when he obtained 40,365 votes, a result that put him in third place in the party federation between REDE and PSOL, behind the PSOL candidate Luciene Cavalcante, first deputy with 49,131 votes, and the then federal deputy Ivan Valente, second deputy with 44,424 votes.

On November 16, 2022 Ricardo Galvão was announced by Vice President-elect Geraldo Alckmin as a member of the transition team in the Environment portfolio of elected government in 2022.

On January 13, 2023, after the inauguration of the government elected in 2022, Minister Luciana Santos decided to appoint Ricardo Galvão as president of CNPq, being inaugurated on January 17.

== Tribute ==
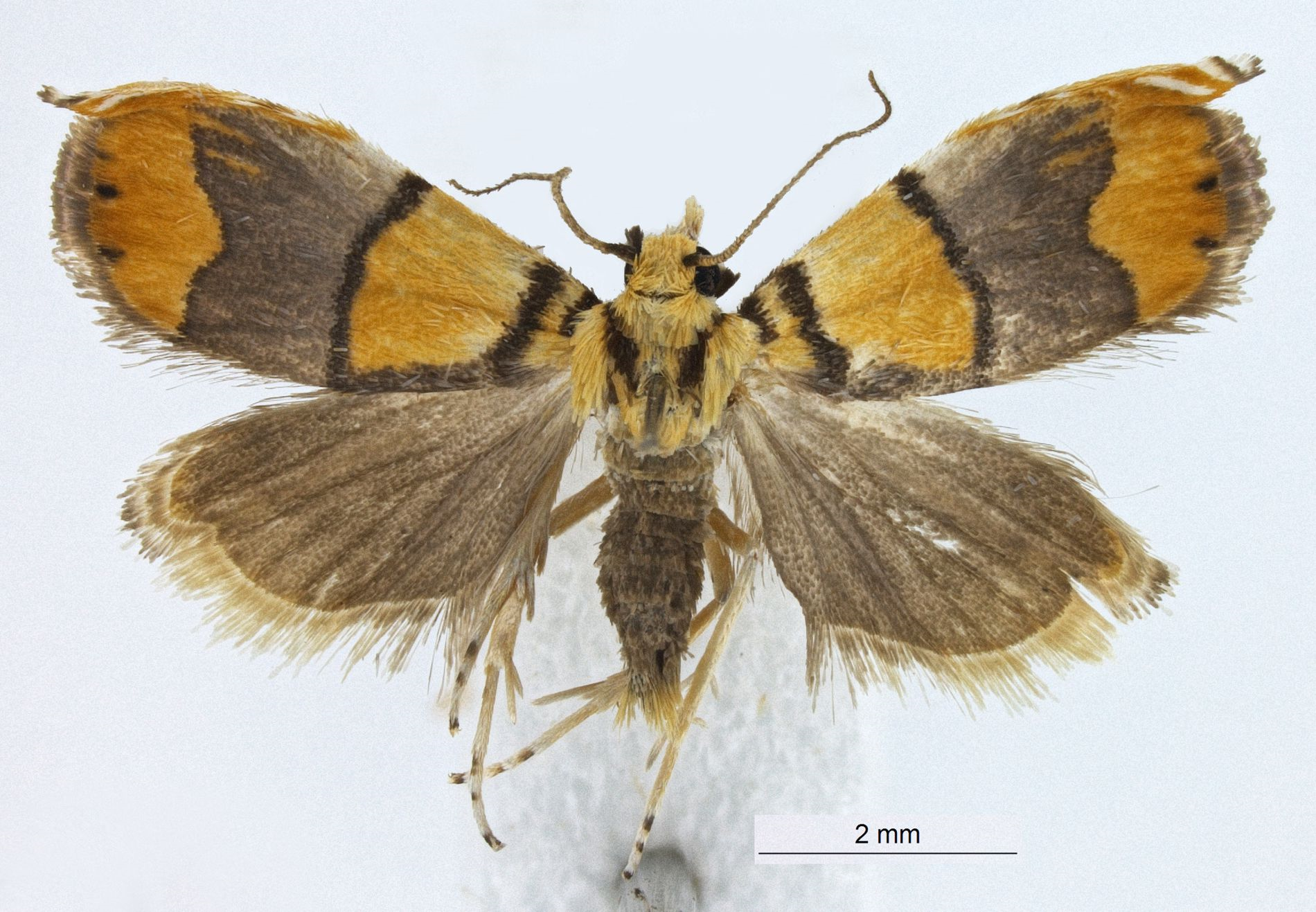
Diptychophora galvani

The moth Diptychophora galvani Landry & Becker, 2021 is dedicated to Galvão, "for his courage in the face of professional adversity". The descriptors also suggest that "the orange colour of the moth's forewings are reminiscent of the devastating fires that had become more prevalent in the Amazon in 2019, compared to 2018, based on Dr Galvão and his team's scientific data that cost Dr Galvão his position of Director of the Brazilian National Institute for Space Research in August 2019".

== Selected papers ==
- Cenacchi, G.; Galvão, R.; Taroni, A. (1 July 1976). "Numerical computation of axisymmetric MHD-equilibria without conducting shell". Nuclear Fusion. 16 (3). IOP Publishing: 457–464. doi:10.1088/0029-5515/16/3/010. ISSN 0029-5515. S2CID 122716591.
- Coppi, B.; Galvao, R.M.O.; Pellat, R.; Rosenbluth, M. N.; RUTHERFORD, P. H.. Resistive Internal Kink Modes. Soviet Journal of Plasma Physics, v. 2, p. 533, 1976
- Galvão, R. M. O.; Sakanaka, P. H.; Shigueoka, H. (25 September 1978). "Influence of Toroidal Effects on the Stability of the Internal Kink Mode". Physical Review Letters. 41 (13). American Physical Society (APS): 870–873. Bibcode:1978PhRvL..41..870G. doi:10.1103/physrevlett.41.870. ISSN 0031-9007. S2CID 119946300.
- Elfimov, A. G.; Segundo, G. Amarante; Galvão, R. M. O.; Nascimento, I. C. (7 February 2000). "Ion Larmour Radius Effect on rf Ponderomotive Forces and Induced Poloidal Flow in Tokamak Plasmas". Physical Review Letters. 84 (6). American Physical Society (APS): 1200–1203. Bibcode:2000PhRvL..84.1200E. doi:10.1103/physrevlett.84.1200. ISSN 0031-9007. PMID 11017478.

== Article ==
- "Patriotismo é defender as instituições e a democracia". Congresso em Foco (in Brazilian Portuguese). 9 September 2022.
