= Abdullah Sadiq =

Pakistani nuclear physicist (born 1940)

- Born: 1940 (age 85–86); Peshawar, Pakistan
- Education: Islamia College University; Peshawar University; University of Illinois Urbana-Champaign
- Known for: Phase transition theory Computer simulation Theoretical physics and Solid-state nuclear track detector
- Awards: Sitara-i-Imtiaz (2002); ICTP Prize (1987)
- Scientific career
- Fields: Condensed matter physics
- Workplaces: Pakistan Atomic Energy Commission (PAEC); Pakistan Institute of Nuclear Science and Technology (PINSTECH); International Centre for Theoretical Physics (ICTP); Ghulam Ishaq Khan Institute of Engineering Sciences and Technology (GIKI); Air University, Pakistan Air Force; Center for Nuclear Physics, Islamabad.
- Doctoral advisor: Leo Kadanoff
- Other academic advisors: Abdul Majid Mian

Abdullah Sadiq (born 1940), is a Pakistani physicist and ICTP laureate who received the ICTP Prize in the honour of Nikolay Bogolyubov, in the fields of mathematics and solid state physics in 1987 for his contributions to scientific knowledge in the field of mathematics and statistical physics. He is the professor of physics and current dean of the department of physics of the Air University of the Pakistan Air Force (PAF).

Sadiq is also a renowned educationist of Pakistan with a specialisation in nuclear physics, solid-state physics, and computer programming. He has been a distinguished professor of nuclear physics and solid state physics in many universities of Pakistan.

== Biography ==
He did his early education from Islamia Collegiate School. Therefore, after his matriculation from Islamia Collegiate school, Sadiq joined the Islamia College Peshawar in 1958. Influenced by Abdus Salam and his work, Sadiq studied for his double major in physics and mathematics, and learned the Zeeman effect, light interferences using the Pérot and Michelson interferometer. In 1962, Sadiq obtained his BSc in physics, and a minor in mathematics. In 1967, Abdullah Sadiq attended Peshawar University, where he joined the physics department as a graduate student, and taught courses in mathematics. In 1969, he received his MSc in physics under the supervision of physicist Abdul Majid Mian from the University of Peshawar. His mentor, Abdul Majid Mian, refused to recommend him for a job after his college degree and instead advised him to gain a doctorate in physics.

His mentor recommended him to go to the United States and gain a doctorate degree in material physics from the University of Illinois Urbana-Champaign. He went to United States for higher studies. In 1971, he got his PhD in condensed matter physics under the supervision of Leo Kadanoff from the University of Illinois Urbana-Champaign, US. Sadiq was a guest lecturer at International Centre for Theoretical Physics (ICTP).

Sadiq was a close friend of Russian theoretical physicist Nikolay Bogolyubov. Sadiq also worked as the rector of Ghulam Ishaq Khan Institute of Engineering Sciences and Technology in Topi, Pakistan. He retired in September 2007 and resided in his home town of Peshawar and focused on his school in RextinKore. Recently, he moved to Islamabad, where he joined Air University at Pakistan Air Force (PAF) as a nuclear physicist and also taught solid state physics and condensed matter physics there. He is also serving as a dean of physics department Air University.

== Pakistan Atomic Energy Commission ==
In 1968, Sadiq moved to Lahore, West Pakistan, where he joined the Pakistan Atomic Energy Commission's Lahore Atomic Center (LAC). There, under Ishfaq Ahmad, Sadiq carefully studied and carried out the experiments on quantum electrodynamics, structure constant of electrons, electromagnetic radiation, and the Maxwell's equations in the field of electrodynamics.

In the Pakistan Atomic Energy Commission (PAEC), Abdullah Sadiq, with among other Pakistani nuclear physicists, worked in a Nuclear Physics Division (NPD) at PINSTECH Department. Abdullah Sadiq was a keen researcher in the field of isotope technology, laser physics, optical physics, particle physics, and radiophysics. Abdullah Sadiq had also worked at neutron particle accelerator as a chief scientist. He has been a distinguished researcher at the PAEC, where he worked with numerous physics research project there. In a physics event, he paid heavy tribute to PAEC chairman Munir Ahmad Khan and Ishfaq Ahmad, who also helped him to write his doctorate thesis.

He carried out the research the work on solid state physics and published numerous papers. The main focus of his research effort in this area is material preparation and characterisation. He has extensive work experience in a number of sophisticated facilities, such as electron microscopes, X-ray and neutron diITractometers, crystal growth equipment, and. Auger spectroscopy. All of these facilities have been established for this purpose and the necessary experience acquired. This work is mainly concentrated at PINSTECH and Quaid-i-Azam University in Islamabad and the Abdus Salam Solid State Centre in Lahore.

After retiring from PAEC, Abdullah Sadiq worked as a professor of high-energy physics in many universities of Pakistan. Due to his work in Pakistan and PAEC. Abdullah Sadiq is considered one of the prominent nuclear physicists and nuclear scientists in Pakistan. He is also a visiting scientist at the Riazuddin National Center of Physics at the Quaid-i-Azam University. Sadiq has contributed to the reputed international physics journals recognised worldwide by the scientists. In 2002, President of Pakistan General Pervez Musharraf also conferred on him Pakistan's third highest civilian award Sitara-e-Imtiaz for his diverse contributions to education and research in physics.

== Published papers ==
- Physics in My Life, Abdullah Sadiq, Riazuddin National Center of Physics, Quaid-i-Azam University.
- Transport coefficients from computer experiments: A stochastic Ising model, Department of Physics, University of Illinois at Urbana-Champaign, Urbana, Illinois 61801

== Bibliography ==
- Condensed Matter Theories by John W. Clark, Abdullah Sadiq (Editor), Khan A. Shoaib (May 1994)
- Kinetics of Domain Growth in Two Dimensions by Abdullah Sadiq and K. Binder
- Transport coefficients from computer experiments: A stochastic Ising model by Abdullah Sadiq

== Association ==
- Member of National Science Talent Contest organising team, a team that selects the most talented of the students from all over Pakistan to represent the country in International Olympiads of Physics, Chemistry, Maths and Biology; held separately in different parts of the world each year.
