= International Centre for Theoretical Sciences =

A branch of Tata Institute of Fundamental Research

The International Centre for Theoretical Sciences(ICTS) was set up in Bengaluru as a branch of Tata Institute of Fundamental Research(TIFR) in 2007. It is a multi, inter-disciplinary centre and research areas include physical, natural and mathematical sciences.

Current Centre-Director is Rajesh Gopakumar.

Its faculty consists of prominent scientist like Ashoke Sen, Deepak Dhar, Rajesh Gopakumar, Sriram Ramaswamy, Spenta Wadia and many others.

It runs outreach programs for general public and students and teachers like Kaapi with Kuriosity, Vigyan Adda, Science Education program and many others.

== Research areas ==
=== Physical & Natural Sciences ===
- Astrophysics
- Relativity
- Biological physics
- Statistical physics
- Condensed matter
- Fluid dynamics and Turbulence
- String theory
- Quantum Gravity

=== Mathematical Sciences ===
- Applied and Computational Mathematics
- Computer Science
- Algebra, Geomtry and Physical Mathematics
- Probability Theory

== Academics ==
It runs PhD, Integrated PhD, postdoctoral, summer research program in many areas.
