= Basudeb Dasgupta (physicist) =

Indian physicist

- Education: Tata Institute of Fundamental Research; Jadavpur University
- Awards: Shanti Swarup Bhatnagar Prize for Science and Technology (2022); Asian Scientist 100 (2020); ICTP Prize (2019)
- Scientific career
- Fields: Physics
- Workplaces: Tata Institute of Fundamental Research; International Centre for Theoretical Physics; Ohio State University; Max Planck Institute for Physics

Basudeb Dasgupta is an Indian physicist who works on neutrinos and dark matter. He was awarded the Shanti Swarup Bhatnagar Prize for Science and Technology, the highest science award in India, for the year 2022 in Physical Sciences. He is also a recipient of the ICTP Prize for 2019, awarded by the International Centre for Theoretical Physics.

Dasgupta obtained a Ph.D. (2009) from Tata Institute of Fundamental Research. He then held postdoctoral positions at Max Planck Institute for Physics, Ohio State University, and at International Centre for Theoretical Physics before joining the Tata Institute of Fundamental Research in Mumbai, where he is currently an associate professor.

He was listed in the Asian Scientist 100 by Asian Scientist. As a part of the celebration of 75 years of Indian independence, the Government of India published a book featuring Dasgupta as one of the 75 scientists aged under 50 who are "shaping today's India".
