= Randeria =

Randeria is a surname. Notable people with the surname include:

- Mohit Randeria (born 1958), US-based Indian physicist
- Shalini Randeria, Indian anthropologist
- Siddharth Randeria (born 1955), Indian actor
