= Diptychophora lojanalis =

Scientific classification
- Domain: Eukaryota
- Kingdom: Animalia
- Phylum: Arthropoda
- Class: Insecta
- Order: Lepidoptera
- Family: Crambidae
- Subfamily: Crambinae
- Tribe: Diptychophorini
- Genus: Diptychophora
- Species: D. lojanalis

Binomial name
- Diptychophora lojanalis (Dognin, 1905)

Synonyms
- Platytes lojanalis Dognin, 1905

Species of moth

Diptychophora lojanalis is a moth in the family Crambidae. It was described by Paul Dognin in 1905. It is found in Ecuador (Loja Province).
