= Shiraz Minwalla =

Indian physicist

Shiraz Naval Minwalla
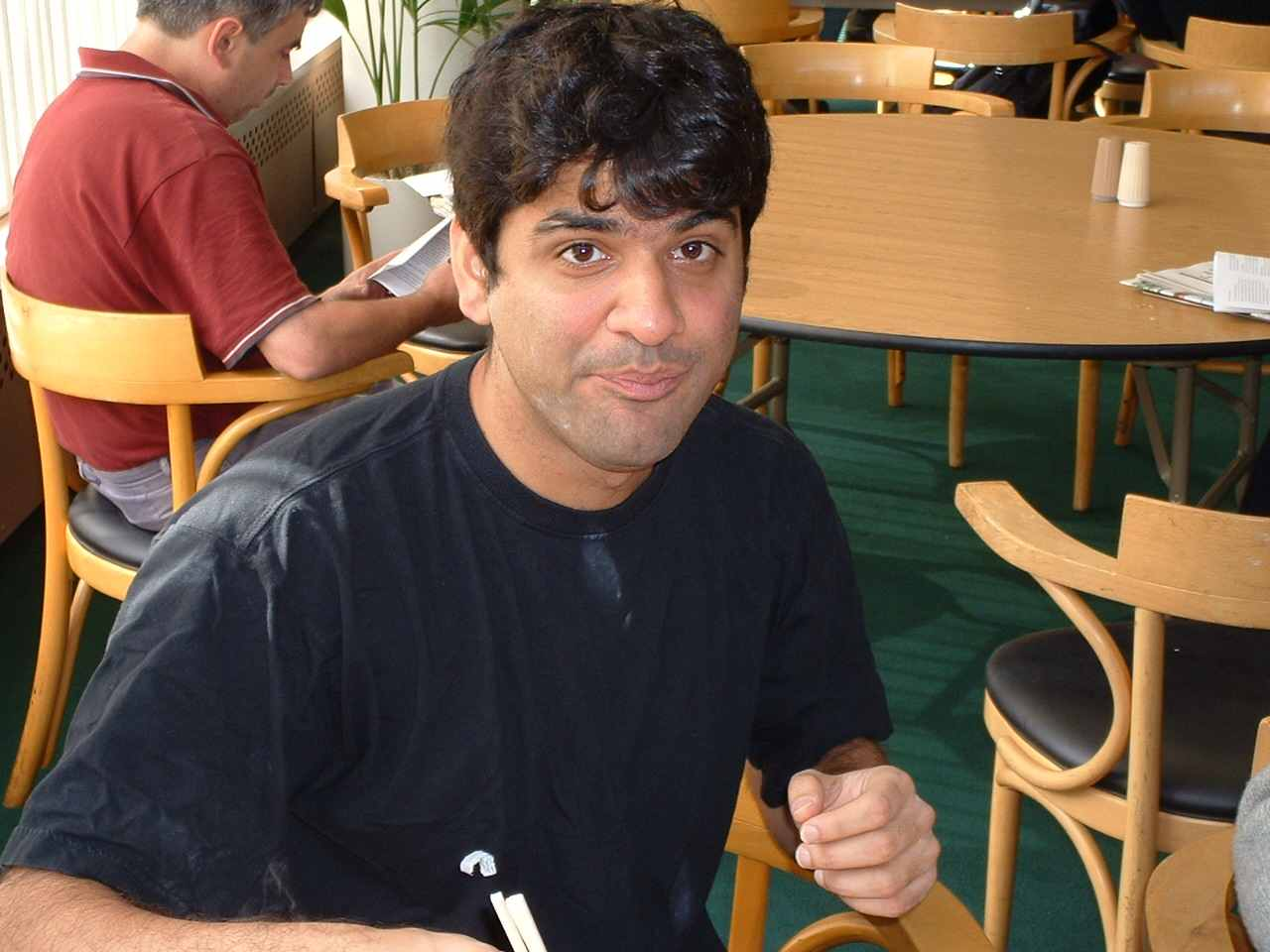
- Shiraz Minwalla at Harvard University
- Born: 2 January 1972 (age 54); Mumbai, Maharashtra, India
- Education: IIT Kanpur (M.Sc.); Princeton University (Ph.D.)
- Spouse: Ananya Dasgupta
- Children: 2
- Awards: ICTP Prize (2010); S.S. Bhatnagar Prize (2011); Nishina Asia Award (2013); Infosys Prize (2013); New Horizons in Physics Prize (2014); TWAS Prize (2016)
- Scientific career
- Fields: String Theory, Theoretical Physics
- Workplaces: Tata Institute of Fundamental Research, Harvard University
- Doctoral advisor: Nathan Seiberg
- Other academic advisors: Andrew Strominger, Spenta Wadia
- Doctoral students: Matthew Headrick

Shiraz Naval Minwalla (born 2 January 1972) is an Indian theoretical physicist and string theorist. He is a faculty member in the Department of Theoretical Physics at Tata Institute of Fundamental Research, Mumbai. Prior to his present position, Minwalla was a Harvard Junior Fellow and subsequently an assistant professor at Harvard University.

== Early life ==
Born in Mumbai, Maharashtra, India, in 1972, to a Parsi Zoroastrian father (Naval) and a Bohra Muslim mother (Khadija), Minwalla graduated from Campion School, Mumbai in 1988 and then Indian Institute of Technology Kanpur in 1995. He later moved to Princeton University to earn his PhD under the guidance of Nathan Seiberg.

== Awards ==
Minwalla was awarded the Swarnajayanti Fellowship 2005–06 by the Department of Science & Technology, Government of India. He was awarded the ICTP Prize in 2010 and the Shanti Swarup Bhatnagar Prize for Science and Technology, the highest science award in India, in the physical sciences category in 2011.

He was awarded the Infosys Prize 2013 in the field of Physical Sciences by the Infosys Science Foundation. Minwalla was awarded the 2014 New Horizons in Physics Prize by the Fundamental Physics Prize for "his pioneering contributions to the study of string theory and quantum field theory; and in particular his work on the connection between the equations of fluid dynamics and Albert Einstein's equations of general relativity." In 2016, The World Academy of Sciences awarded him the TWAS Prize in Physics.

== Notable contributions to the field ==
- Analysis of primary operators on AdS4 and AdS7
- Three-point functions in N=4 supersymmetric Yang–Mills theory and AdS/CFT
- Noncommutative perturbative dynamics (with Nathan Seiberg and Mark Van Raamsdonk)
- Noncommutative solitons (with Andrew Strominger and Rajesh Gopakumar)
- OM-theory (with Nathan Seiberg, Andrew Strominger and Rajesh Gopakumar)
- Stringy interactions in pp-waves
- Some insights about tachyon condensation
- Dualities in supersymmetric gauge theories, in particular Chern-Simons-matter theories
- Fluid-Gravity correspondence, the connections between hydrodynamics and AdS/CFT.(with Sayantani Bhattacharyya)

== Personal life ==
Shiraz Minwalla lives in Mumbai with his wife and their two children.

== Selected works ==
- Bhattacharyya, Sayantani; Hubeny, Veronika E.; Loganayagam, R.; Mandal, Gautam; Minwalla, Shiraz; Morita, Takeshi; Rangamani, Mukund; Reall, Harvey S. (2008). "Local fluid dynamical entropy from gravity". Journal of High Energy Physics. 2008 (6): 055. arXiv:0803.2526. Bibcode:2008JHEP...06..055B. doi:10.1088/1126-6708/2008/06/055. S2CID 3085486.
