= Diptychophora desmoteria =

Scientific classification
- Kingdom: Animalia
- Phylum: Arthropoda
- Class: Insecta
- Order: Lepidoptera
- Family: Crambidae
- Subfamily: Crambinae
- Tribe: Diptychophorini
- Genus: Diptychophora
- Species: D. desmoteria

Binomial name
- Diptychophora desmoteria (Meyrick, 1931)

Synonyms
- Mysticomima desmoteria Meyrick, 1931

Species of moth

Diptychophora desmoteria is a moth in the family Crambidae. It was described by Edward Meyrick in 1931. It is found in Costa Rica.
