= Diptychophora huixtla =

Scientific classification
- Kingdom: Animalia
- Phylum: Arthropoda
- Clade: Pancrustacea
- Class: Insecta
- Order: Lepidoptera
- Family: Crambidae
- Subfamily: Crambinae
- Tribe: Diptychophorini
- Genus: Diptychophora
- Species: D. huixtla

Binomial name
- Diptychophora huixtla B. Landry, 1990

Species of moth

Diptychophora huixtla is a moth in the family Crambidae. It was described by Bernard Landry in 1990. It is found in Chiapas, Mexico.
