= Diptychophora kuphitincta =

Scientific classification
- Domain: Eukaryota
- Kingdom: Animalia
- Phylum: Arthropoda
- Class: Insecta
- Order: Lepidoptera
- Family: Crambidae
- Subfamily: Crambinae
- Tribe: Diptychophorini
- Genus: Diptychophora
- Species: D. kuphitincta

Binomial name
- Diptychophora kuphitincta T. P. Lucas, 1898

Species of moth

Diptychophora kuphitincta is a moth in the family Crambidae. It was described by Thomas Pennington Lucas in 1898. It is found in Australia, where it has been recorded from Queensland.
