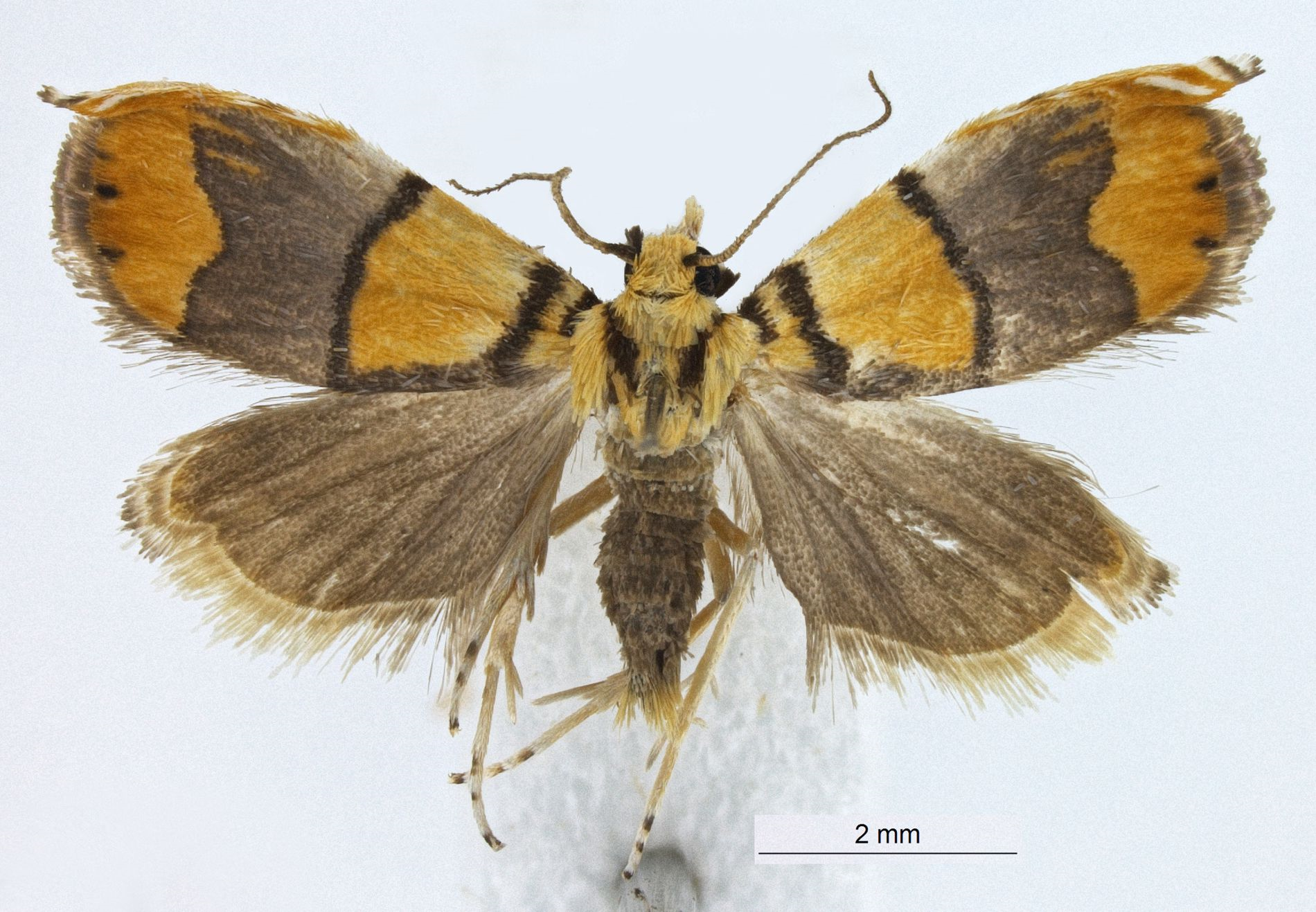
- The holotype, a female imago

Scientific classification
- Kingdom: Animalia
- Phylum: Arthropoda
- Clade: Pancrustacea
- Class: Insecta
- Order: Lepidoptera
- Family: Crambidae
- Genus: Diptychophora
- Species: D. galvani

Binomial name
- Diptychophora galvani Landry & Becker, 2021

= Diptychophora galvani =

Species of moth

Diptychophora galvani is a species of moth in the family Crambidae. It measures about one centimeter in wingspan and is easily distinguished from all closely related species by the color pattern of its forewings. These are orange at their base and tip with a large intermediate gray patch, a pattern not found in any other species of Diptychophora. The female has grayish hindwings, while they are entirely white in the male. The genitalia of both male and female are also quite different from other members of this genus. The biology of the species remains completely unknown, including the host plant of the larval stage, although some species of the tribe Diptychophorini are known to feed on mosses.

Diptychophora galvani is known only from Brazil, where it was collected in the states of Mato Grosso and Minas Gerais, at 700–800 m (2,300–2,600 ft) altitude. There it inhabits the Cerrado ecoregion, consisting of gallery forests and savannahs, with a dry season. It was collected for the first time in 1982 by Vitor O. Becker, but its description by Bernard Landry and Becker was published only in 2021. Its specific epithet, galvani, pays tribute to Ricardo Galvão, a Brazilian physicist who headed the National Institute for Space Research of Brazil and was dismissed in 2019 for publicly opposing the Brazilian president Jair Bolsonaro, a notorious climate change denier. The latter had claimed that data produced by the institute demonstrating the substantial increase in Amazonian forest deforestation following his rise to power, including devastating fires in 2019, were false. The descriptors of the species dedicate the species to Galvão for "his courage in the face of professional adversity", but also because the color of the butterfly's wings recalls that of forest fires. The moth is named "species of the year 2022 of the Swiss Systematics Society".

== Taxonomy ==
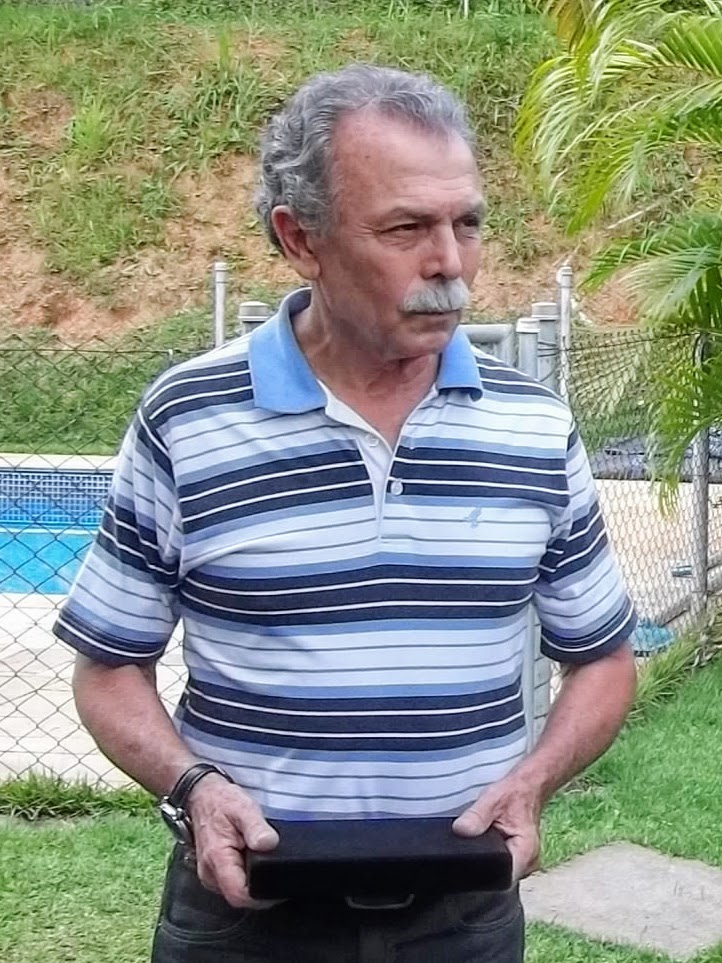
The Brazilian physicist Ricardo Galvão in 2015.

The species Diptychophora galvani was described by Bernard Landry and Vitor O. Becker in 2021 based on specimens collected by Becker in 1982, 1983, and 1986. The type series includes two females (including the holotype) and two males. The two females and a male are deposited in Becker's personal collection (collecting event numbers 106575, 49809, and 49079), and a male (MHNG-ENTO-84604) from the type locality is deposited in the Natural History Museum of Geneva, Switzerland. Two other Brazilian species of Diptychophora, D. planaltina and D. ardalia, were described in the same publication.

The name of the genus Diptychophora comes from the ancient Greek and means "which bears two folds", possibly in reference to the two constrictions on the termen of the forewing, near the apex, a character that was given as diagnostic in the original description of the genus by the German entomologist Philipp Christoph Zeller.

The species epithet galvani refers to Ricardo Galvão, a physicist and former director of the Brazilian National Institute for Space Research (INPE). Galvão opposed the president of Brazil Jair Bolsonaro when the latter claimed – in a public international press conference – that the 2019 data provided by INPE, on the substantial increase of deforestation in the Amazon forest since Bolsonaro's election in 2018, were false. Certain of the correctness and quality of the data, as Director of INPE, Galvão stood up and challenged Bolsonaro to prove his assertion in a face-to-face discussion. The challenge was not accepted and Galvão was fired from the INPE's directorship. The descriptors of Diptychophora galvani dedicated the species to Galvão for "his courage in the face of professional adversity", but also because the colors of the moth’s forewings are reminiscent of the devastating Amazon rainforest wildfires that were demonstrated by the INPE data.

== Description ==
Diptychophora galvani measures 10–12 mm (0.39–0.47 in) in wingspan, with forewings 4.5 mm (0.18 in) long in the male and 5.0–5.5 mm (0.20–0.22 in) in the female. The species is easily distinguished from all other closely related species of the genus Diptychophora by the remarkable pattern of its forewings. These have two large orange areas, one distal (at the wing tip) and one proximal (at the base of the wing), the latter bordered with thick dark brown lines. These two orange areas are separated by a large gray median (middle) section. The hindwings are white in males and grayish in females.

Regarding the genitalia of the male, the elongated uncus that is fused with the tegumen is a unique diagnostic character. In the female, the copulatory bursa is adorned with two sclerotized elements (the signa bursae) – one of which is very large and crescent- or boomerang-shaped, while the other is small, elongated-rounded, and folded. This morphology is not found in any other species of the genus Diptychophora.

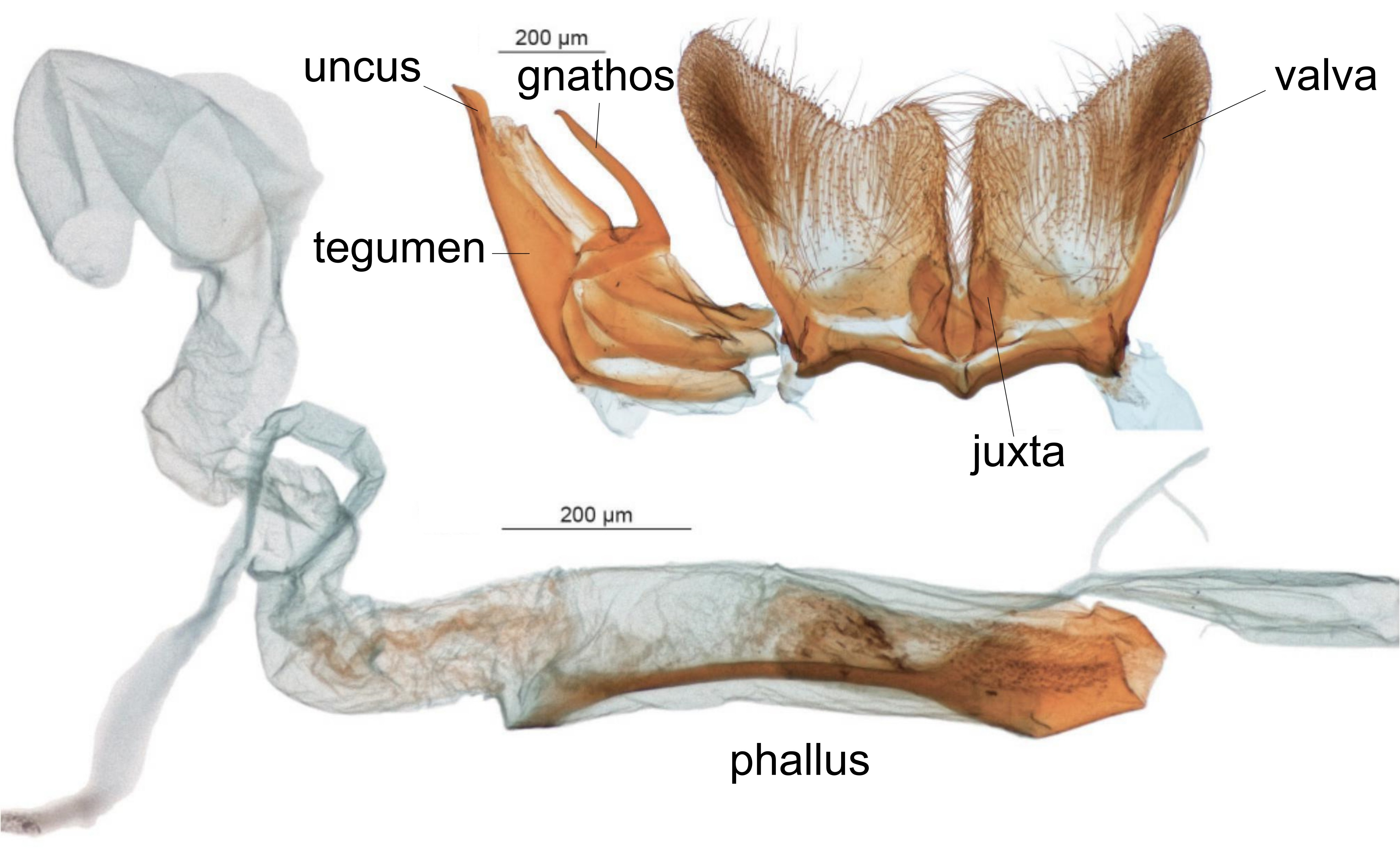
Male genitala of Diptychophora galvani.

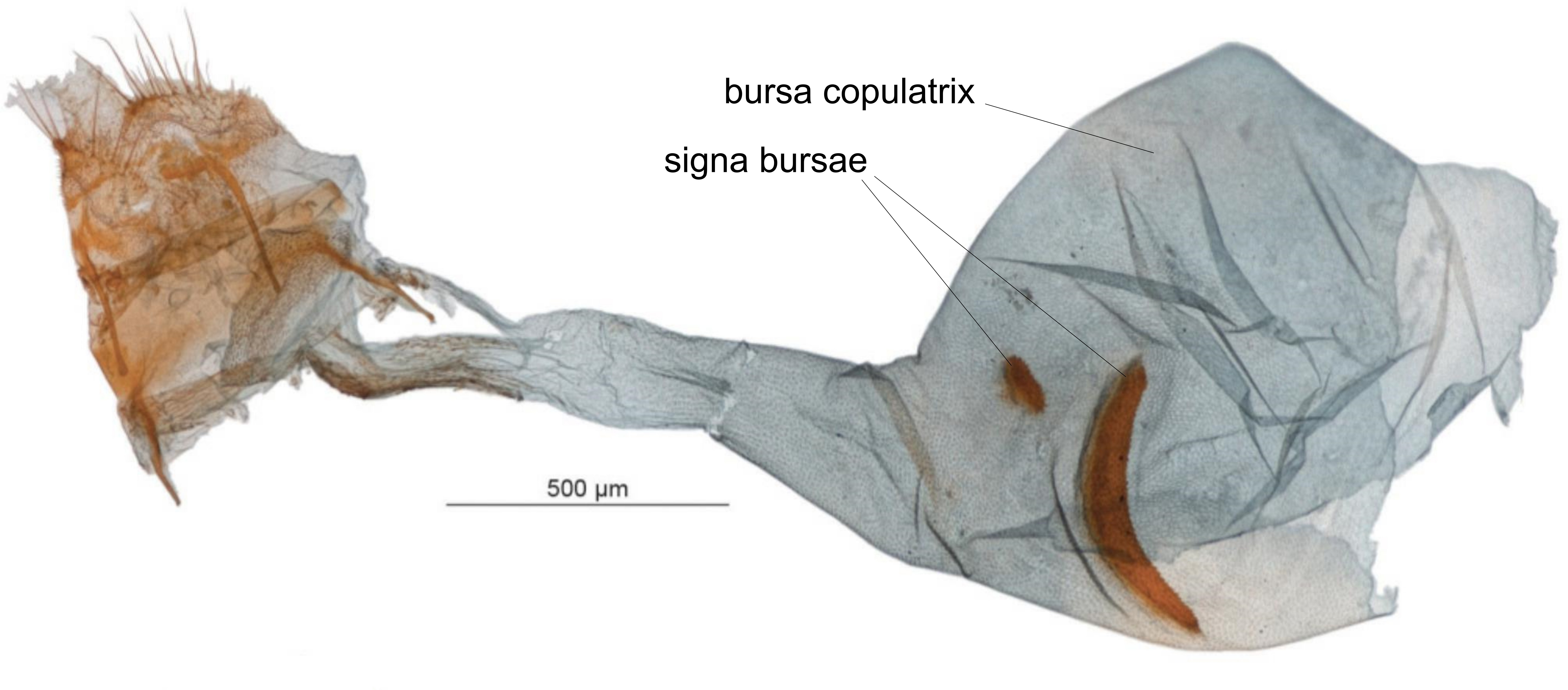
Female genitala of Diptychophora galvani.

== Ecology ==
The specimens available for the description of the species were attracted to light at night with a mercury-vapor lamp. Diptychophora galvani is known only from the adult stage. No hostplant is known, as is the case for all of the species of Diptychophora. The only available information on the pabulum of the caterpillars in the tribe Diptychophorini concerns three species of the genus Glaucocharis in New Zealand that feed on mosses.

== Distribution and habitat ==
Approximate locations in Brazil were type specimens were collected.

Diptychophora galvani was described from the Brazilian municipality of Chapada dos Guimarães, in Mato Grosso, where it was collected at an elevation of 800 m (2,600 ft); the type series also includes specimens from Unaí, in Minas Gerais, which were found at an elevation of 700 m (2,300 ft). The habitat of the species is the Cerrado, a major ecoregion of Brazil located between the Amazonian forest and the Atlantic forest. The region is characterized by a seasonal drought and is composed of more or less wooded savannas, humid zones, and gallery forests, on poor acidic soils. The known specimens of Diptychophora galvani were collected alongside gallery forests.

== In the culture ==
In February 2022, Diptychophora galvani is named "species of the year 2022 of the Swiss Systematics Society", among 158 species described by taxonomists based in Switzerland during the year 2021.

== Bibliography ==
- Bernard Landry; Vitor O. Becker (23 April 2021). "A taxonomic review of the genus Diptychophora Zeller (Lepidoptera, Pyralidae sensu lato, Crambinae) in Brazil, with descriptions of three new species". Revue suisse de Zoologie. 128 (1): 73–84. doi:10.35929/RSZ.0036. ISSN 0035-418X. Wikidata Q107820343.
