= Mohit Randeria =

US-based Indian condensed matter physicist

- Born: March 9, 1958 (age 68); New Delhi, India
- Education: 1975–80 IIT Delhi; 1980–82 California Institute of Technology; 1982–87 Cornell University
- Known for: Studies on condensed matter theory and superconductivity
- Awards: 1997 B.M. Birla Prize; 2002 ICTP Prize; 2002 Shanti Swarup Bhatnagar Prize; 2007 IIT Delhi Distinguished Alumni Award; 2023 OSU Distinguished Scholar Award
- Scientific career
- Fields: Condensed matter physics
- Workplaces: 1987–89 University of Illinois; 1989–91 State University of New York; 1991–95 Argonne National Laboratory; 1995–2004 Tata Institute of Fundamental Research; 2004– Ohio State University; 2002–03 University of Illinois-visiting
- Doctoral advisor: James P. Sethna; Anthony James Leggett

Mohit Randeria (born March 9, 1958) is a US-based Indian condensed matter physicist and a professor of physics at Ohio State University. Known for his research on condensed matter theory and superconductivity, Randeria is an elected fellow of the American Physics Society. The Council of Scientific and Industrial Research, the apex agency of the Government of India for scientific research, awarded him the Shanti Swarup Bhatnagar Prize for Science and Technology, one of the highest Indian science awards, for his contributions to physical sciences in 2002. (Note: Long link - please select award year to see details) He was awarded the 2002 ICTP Prize of the International Center for Theoretical Physics, Trieste and the 2022 John Bardeen Prize.

== Biography ==
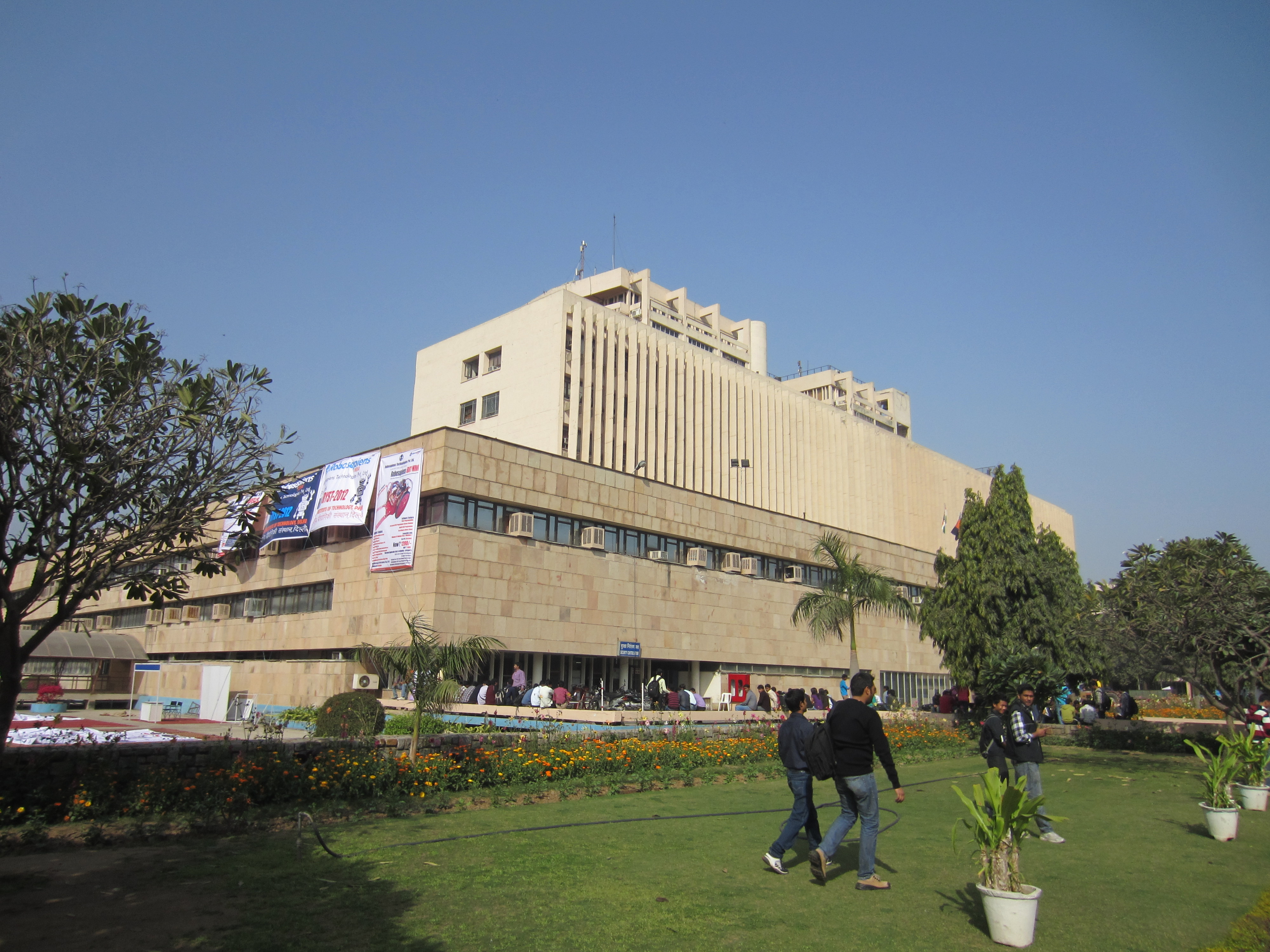
IIT Delhi

Born on March 9, 1958, in the India capital of New Delhi, Mohit Randeria graduated in electrical engineering from the Indian Institute of Technology, Delhi in 1980 and moved to the US for his master's studies to earn an MS degree in physics from California Institute of Technology in 1982. Subsequently, he enrolled at Cornell University in 1984 for his doctoral studies under the guidance of James P. Sethna and after securing a PhD in 1987, he did his post-doctoral work at the University of Illinois at Urbana–Champaign during 1987–89, in the group of Anthony James Leggett, who would go on to win the Nobel Prize for Physics in 2003.

== Legacy ==
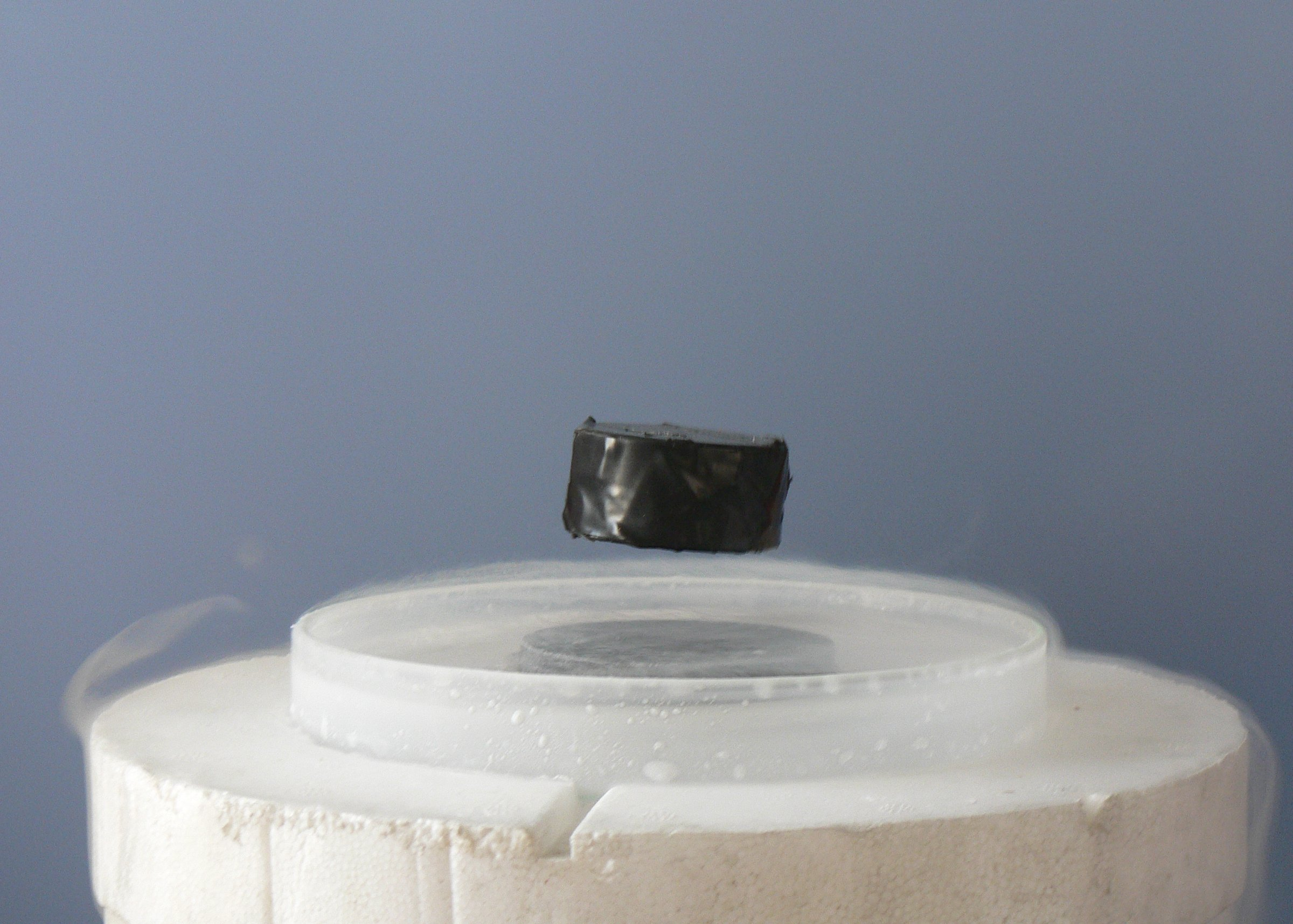
A magnet levitating above a high-temperature superconductor, cooled with liquid nitrogen

Randeria's work has primarily been focused on high temperature superconductors. Besides, he has also worked on condensed matter theory, ultracold atomic gases, photoelectron spectroscopy, magnetism, disorder and nanoscale inhomogeneity in oxides as well as theoretical analysis of photoemision spectroscopy experiments. His studies have been documented by way of a number of articles (Note: Please see Selected bibliography section) and Google Scholar, an online article repository of scientific articles, has listed 223 of them.

Randeria is known to have been active in organizing science conferences and seminars. He served as the co-organizer of Correlated Quantum Matter workshop in 2005 and Recent Progress in Many-Body Theories international conference in 2009 and was a member of advisory committees/panels of the International Conference on Low Temperature Physics in 2005, Materials and Mechanisms of Superconductivity M2S conference held in Dresden in 2006, Basic Research Needs for Superconductivity seminar of Department of Energy in 2006, Spectroscopies of Novel Superconductors seminar in 2007 and Materials and Mechanisms of Superconductivity seminar held in Tokyo in 2009. The plenary or invited talks delivered by him include two talks at Kavli Institute for Theoretical Physics in 2004 and 2009, the talks at Oxford University and Princeton University in 2004, at University of Notre Dame, Max Planck Institute for the Physics of Complex Systems and International Centre for Theoretical Physics in 2005, at Nordic Institute for Theoretical Physics, Indian Institute of Science, Brasilia Winter School and Rutgers Mathematical Physics Conference in 2006, at Landau Institute for Theoretical Physics and Institut Henri Poincaré in 2007 count among them.

== Awards and honors ==
Randeria received the B. M. Birla Science Prize of the B. M. Birla Science Centre in 1997. A year later, he was selected for the Swarnajayanti Fellowship of the Department of Science and Technology for a five-year tenure that ran between 1998 and 2003. The Council of Scientific and Industrial Research awarded him the Shanti Swarup Bhatnagar Prize, one of the highest Indian science awards in 2002. The same year, he received the ICTP Prize of the International Center for Theoretical Physics. His alma mater, the Indian Institute of Technology, Delhi chose him for the Distinguished Alumni Award in 2008 and the American Physics Society elected him as their fellow in 2008. He was awarded the 2022 John Bardeen Prize “for pioneering theoretical work that has provided significant insights on the nature of superconductivity, its realization in strongly correlated systems, and experimental probes of unconventional superconductors,” specifically “for contributions to the theory of the BCS-BEC crossover, for providing theoretical understanding of angle-resolved photoemission experiments on superconducting and pseudo gap phases of the cuprate superconductors, and for providing rigorous bounds on the superconducting transition temperature in two-dimensional materials.” He received The Ohio State University Distinguished Scholar Award in 2023.

== Selected bibliography ==
=== Chapters ===
- Randeria, Mohit (13 July 1996). "Crossover from BCS Theory to Bose-Einstein Condensation". In Griffin, A.; Snoke, D. W.; Stringari, S. (eds.). Bose-Einstein Condensation. Cambridge University Press. pp. 355–. ISBN 978-0-521-58990-1.
- Trivedi, Nandini; Ghoshal, Amit; Randeria, Mohit (2000). "Recent Progress on Models of Highly Disordered Superconductors". In Bishop, Raymond F. (ed.). Recent Progress in Many-body Theories: The Proceedings of the 10th International Conference, Seattle, USA, September 10-15, 1999. World Scientific. pp. 54–. ISBN 978-981-02-4318-0.
- Randeria, Mohit; Sensharma, Rajdeep; Trivedi, Nandini (1 November 2011). "Projected Wavefunctions and High T_{c} Superconductivity in Doped Mott Insulators". In Avella, Adolfo; Mancini, Ferdinando (eds.). Strongly Correlated Systems: Theoretical Methods. Springer Science & Business Media. pp. 29–. ISBN 978-3-642-21831-6.
- Randeria, Mohit (21 December 2015). "High T_{c} Superconductivity and RVB". In Chandra, Premi; Coleman, Piers; Kotlyar, Gabi; Ong, Phuan; Stein, Daniel L.; Yu, Clare (eds.). PWA90: A Lifetime of Emergence. pp. 113–. Bibcode:2016pwa..book.....C. doi:10.1142/9882. ISBN 978-981-4733-63-2.

=== Articles ===
- Mohit Randeria (2007). "High Tc superconductivity in doped Mott insulators" (PDF). Larkin Memorial Conference.
- Mohit Randeria (2010). "Ultracold Fermi gases: Pre-pairing for condensation". Nature Physics. 6 (8): 561–562. Bibcode:2010NatPh...6..561R. doi:10.1038/nphys1748.
- Mohit Randeria, Edward Taylor (2014). "BCS-BEC Crossover and the Unitary Fermi Gas". Annual Review of Condensed Matter Physics. 5 (a): 209–232. arXiv:1306.5785. Bibcode:2014ARCMP...5..209R. doi:10.1146/annurev-conmatphys-031113-133829. S2CID 119292503.
- Mohit Randeria (2017). "Introduction to Many-Body Physics". Physics Today. 70 (5): 59–60. Bibcode:2017PhT....70e..59R. doi:10.1063/PT.3.3558.

== See also ==
- Chaos theory
- Condensed matter theory
