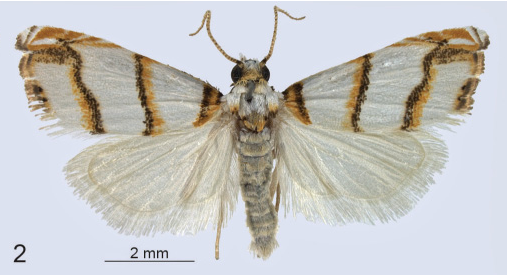

Scientific classification
- Kingdom: Animalia
- Phylum: Arthropoda
- Clade: Pancrustacea
- Class: Insecta
- Order: Lepidoptera
- Family: Crambidae
- Subfamily: Crambinae
- Tribe: Diptychophorini
- Genus: Diptychophora
- Species: D. kuhlweinii

Binomial name
- Diptychophora kuhlweinii Zeller, 1866

Synonyms
- Diptychophora kuhlweini Zeller, 1866

= Diptychophora kuhlweinii =

Species of moth

Diptychophora kuhlweinii is a moth in the family Crambidae. It was described by Zeller in 1866. It is found in Brazil (Rio de Janeiro).
