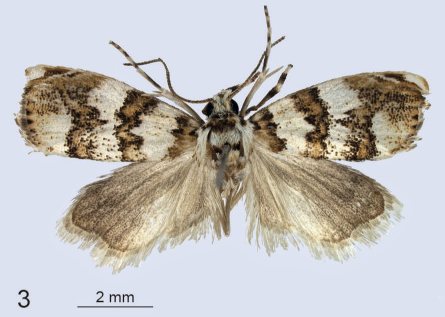
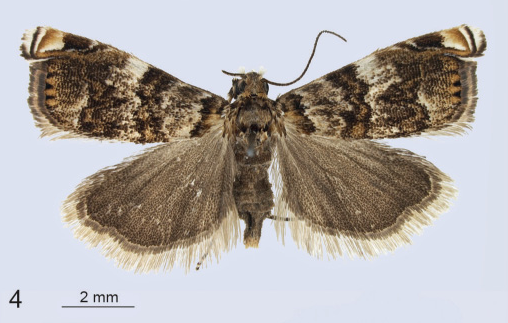
- A male (above) and female (below) Diptychophora diasticta

Scientific classification
- Kingdom: Animalia
- Phylum: Arthropoda
- Clade: Pancrustacea
- Class: Insecta
- Order: Lepidoptera
- Family: Crambidae
- Subfamily: Crambinae
- Tribe: Diptychophorini
- Genus: Diptychophora
- Species: D. diasticta

Binomial name
- Diptychophora diasticta Gaskin, 1986

= Diptychophora diasticta =

Species of moth

Diptychophora diasticta is a moth in the family Crambidae. It was described by David E. Gaskin in 1986. It is found in Bahia, Brazil.
