= Diptychophora minimalis =

Scientific classification
- Kingdom: Animalia
- Phylum: Arthropoda
- Class: Insecta
- Order: Lepidoptera
- Family: Crambidae
- Subfamily: Crambinae
- Tribe: Diptychophorini
- Genus: Diptychophora
- Species: D. minimalis

Binomial name
- Diptychophora minimalis Hampson, 1919

Species of moth

Diptychophora minimalis is a moth in the family Crambidae. It was described by George Hampson in 1919. It is found in Sierra Leone.
