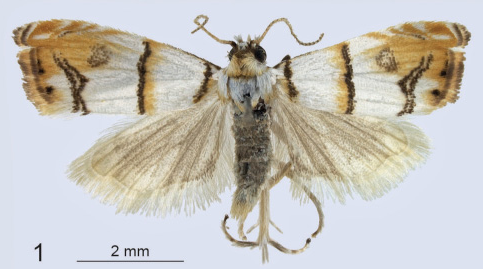
- D. subazanalis female

Scientific classification
- Kingdom: Animalia
- Phylum: Arthropoda
- Class: Insecta
- Order: Lepidoptera
- Family: Crambidae
- Subfamily: Crambinae
- Tribe: Diptychophorini
- Genus: Diptychophora
- Species: D. subazanalis

Binomial name
- Diptychophora subazanalis Błeszyński, 1967

= Diptychophora subazanalis =

Species of moth

Diptychophora subazanalis is a moth in the family Crambidae. It was described by Stanisław Błeszyński in 1967. It is found in Suriname, Brazil and Bolivia
