= T. N. Venkataramana =

Indian mathematician (born 1958)

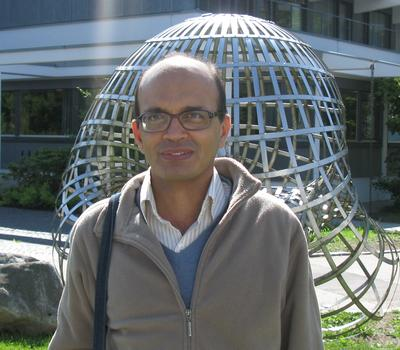
- Born: 1958 (age 67–68); Bangalore, Karnataka, India
- Education: Bombay University
- Awards: Shanti Swarup Bhatnagar Prize for Science and Technology
- Scientific career
- Fields: Algebraic groups, automorphic forms in mathematics
- Workplaces: Tata Institute of Fundamental Research

Tyakal Nanjundiah Venkataramana (born 1958) is an Indian mathematician who specialises in algebraic groups and automorphic forms.

He was awarded the Shanti Swarup Bhatnagar Prize for Science and Technology in 2001, the highest science award in India, in the mathematical sciences category. Venkataramana's first major work was the extension of G. A. Margulis's work on arithmeticity of higher rank lattices to the case of groups in positive characteristics. He also has contributions to non-vanishing theorems on cohomology of arithmetic groups, to Lefschetz type theorems on restriction of cohomology on locally symmetric spaces and to arithmeticity of monodromy groups.

== Other awards/honours ==
- Young Scientist Award (1990)
- Birla Award (2000)
- ICTP Prize (2000)
- Fellow, Indian Academy of Sciences, Bangalore
- Fellow, Indian National Science Academy, 2004
- Fellow of the American Mathematical Society, 2012
- Speaker at the ARbeitstagung, 1999
- Invited Speaker at the ICM, 2010, Hyderabad
