= Abhishek Dhar =

Indian physicist

- Born: 31 August 1970 (age 56); Sarbhang, Bhutan
- Education: Presidency College, Kolkata (BSc); Rajabazar Science College, Kolkata (MSc); Tata Institute of Fundamental Research, Mumbai (PhD)
- Spouse: Ranjini Bandyopadhyay
- Awards: ICTP Prize (2008); Shanti Swarup Bhatnagar Prize (2009)
- Scientific career
- Fields: Physics
- Workplaces: Raman Research Institute; International Centre for Theoretical Sciences
- Thesis: Studies of Nonequilibrium Steady States (1998)
- Doctoral advisor: Deepak Dhar
- Website: www.icts.res.in/people/abhishek-dhar

Abhishek Dhar (born 31 August 1970) is an Indian physicist specialising in statistical physics and condensed matter physics. He is a professor at the International Centre for Theoretical Sciences, Bangalore.

== Education and career ==
Dhar obtained his PhD in 1998 from the Department of Theoretical Physics at the Tata Institute of Fundamental Research. His doctoral advisor was Deepak Dhar. He did post-doctoral research at Indian Institute of Science, Raman Research Institute and University of California, Santa Cruz. Dhar then became a faculty member of the Raman Research Institute and later joined the International Centre for Theoretical Sciences.

== Research ==
Dhar works on the theory and applications of statistical physics to study non-equilibrium problems. His research areas include anomalous heat transport in low dimensional systems and open quantum systems where he made significant contributions in developing an approach using quantum Langevin equations. Dhar also studies large deviations and fluctuation theorems in transport, foundational aspects of statistical mechanics, the derivation of hydrodynamics from microscopic theory, the measurement problem in quantum mechanics and models of active matter.

== Awards ==
For his results in classical and quantum transport in low dimensional systems and contributions to non-equilibrium fluctuation theorems, Dhar was awarded the ICTP prize in 2008 and Shanti Swarup Bhatnagar award for Physical Sciences in 2009. He is a fellow of the Indian Academy of Sciences (2012), the National Academy of Sciences (2018) and the Indian National Science Academy (2020).
