= Diptychophora incisalis =

Scientific classification
- Kingdom: Animalia
- Phylum: Arthropoda
- Class: Insecta
- Order: Lepidoptera
- Family: Crambidae
- Subfamily: Crambinae
- Tribe: Diptychophorini
- Genus: Diptychophora
- Species: D. incisalis

Binomial name
- Diptychophora incisalis (Dyar, 1925)

Synonyms
- Colimaea incisalis Dyar, 1925

Species of moth

Diptychophora incisalis is a moth in the family Crambidae. It was described by Harrison Gray Dyar Jr. in 1925. It is found in Mexico.
