= Diptychophora harlequinalis =

Scientific classification
- Domain: Eukaryota
- Kingdom: Animalia
- Phylum: Arthropoda
- Class: Insecta
- Order: Lepidoptera
- Family: Crambidae
- Subfamily: Crambinae
- Tribe: Diptychophorini
- Genus: Diptychophora
- Species: D. harlequinalis

Binomial name
- Diptychophora harlequinalis (Barnes & McDunnough, 1914)

Synonyms
- Scissolia harlequinalis Barnes & McDunnough, 1914

Species of moth

Diptychophora harlequinalis is a moth in the family Crambidae. It was described by William Barnes and James Halliday McDunnough in 1914. It is found in North America, where it has been recorded from Arizona.

The wingspan is about 12 mm. Adults are on wing from August to September.
