= Diptychophora muscella =

Scientific classification
- Domain: Eukaryota
- Kingdom: Animalia
- Phylum: Arthropoda
- Class: Insecta
- Order: Lepidoptera
- Family: Crambidae
- Subfamily: Crambinae
- Tribe: Diptychophorini
- Genus: Diptychophora
- Species: D. muscella

Binomial name
- Diptychophora muscella Fryer, 1912

Species of moth

Diptychophora muscella is a moth in the family Crambidae. It was described by John Fryer in 1912. It is found on the Seychelles, where it has been recorded from Mahé and Silhouette.
