= Diptychophora powelli =

Scientific classification
- Kingdom: Animalia
- Phylum: Arthropoda
- Clade: Pancrustacea
- Class: Insecta
- Order: Lepidoptera
- Family: Crambidae
- Subfamily: Crambinae
- Tribe: Diptychophorini
- Genus: Diptychophora
- Species: D. powelli

Binomial name
- Diptychophora powelli B. Landry, 1990

Species of moth

Diptychophora powelli is a moth in the family Crambidae. It was described by Bernard Landry in 1990. It is found in Guerrero, Mexico.
