= Yasaman Farzan =

Iranian researcher, professor and physicist

- یاسمن فرزان
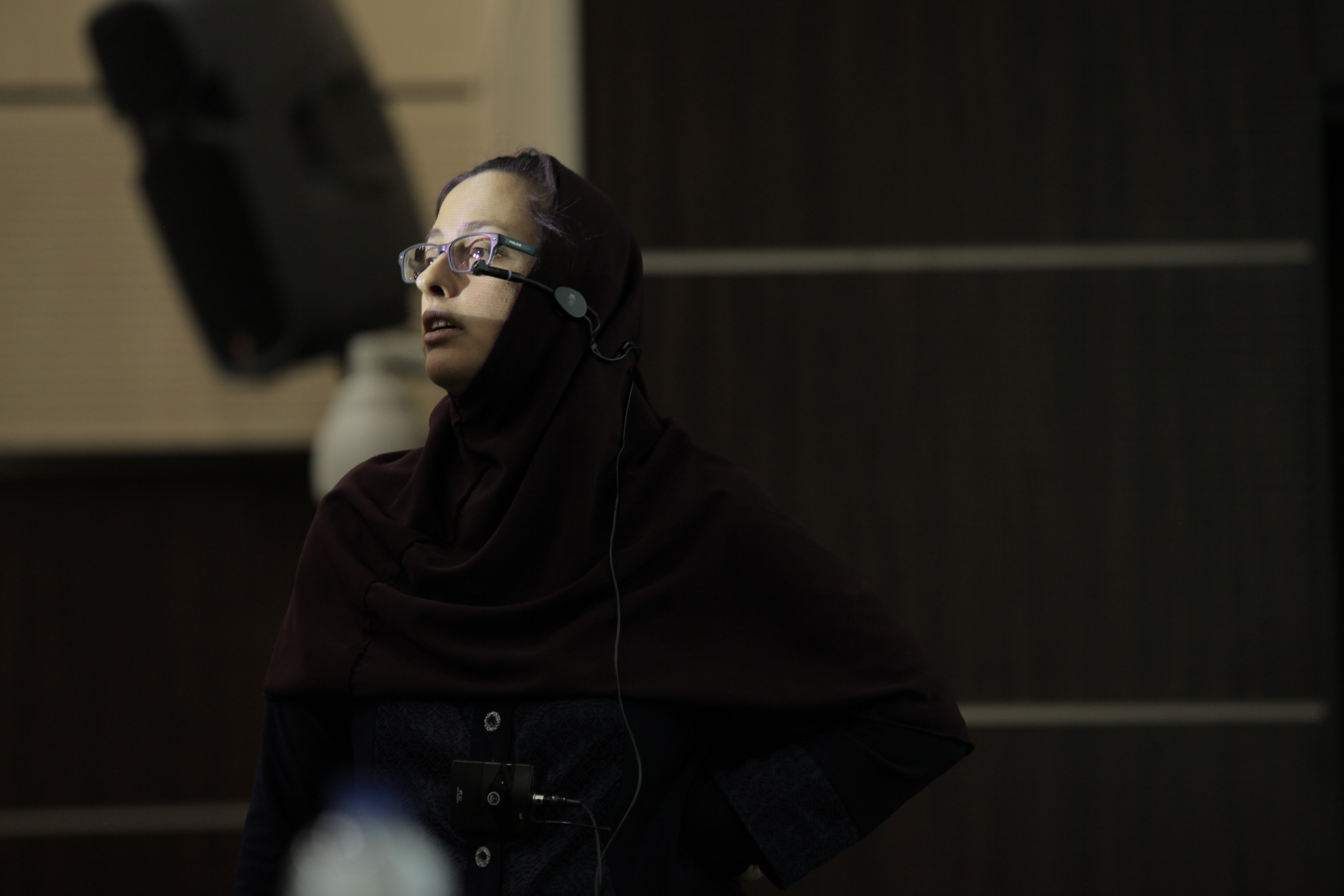
- Born: January 1977 (age 49); Tabriz, Iran
- Education: Sharif University of Technology
- Known for: Research about particle physics, especially neutrino
- Awards: The Kharazmi young scientist Award (2006); Young Scientist Prize (2008); ICTP Prize (2013)
- Scientific career
- Fields: physics

Yasaman Farzan (Persian: یاسمن فرزان was born 1977 in Tabriz) is an Iranian researcher. She is a faculty member of Institute for Research in Fundamental Sciences.

== Awards ==
- The Kharazmi young scientist Award in 2006
- Young Scientist Prize of the International Union of Pure and Applied Physics (IUPAP) in 2008
- International Centre for Theoretical Physics Prize in 2013
