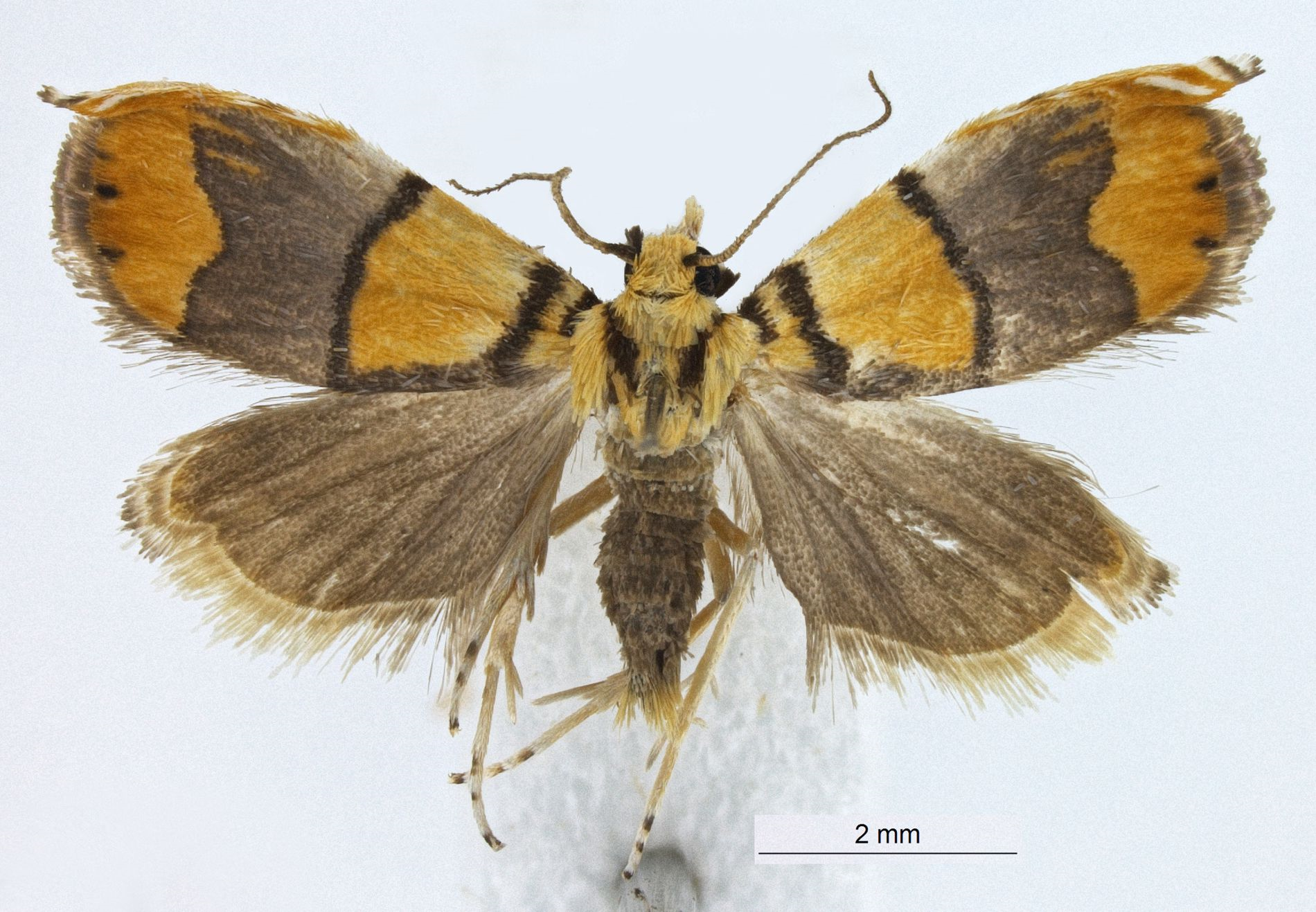
- Holotype of Diptychophora galvani.

Scientific classification
- Domain: Eukaryota
- Kingdom: Animalia
- Phylum: Arthropoda
- Class: Insecta
- Order: Lepidoptera
- Family: Crambidae
- Subfamily: Crambinae
- Tribe: Diptychophorini
- Genus: Diptychophora; Zeller, 1866

Synonyms
- Colimaea Dyar, 1925; Colimea Bleszynski, 1966; Mysticomima Meyrick, 1931; Scissolia Barnes & McDunnough, 1914

= Diptychophora =

Genus of moths

Diptychophora is a genus of moths of the Crambidae (grass moth) family.

== Species ==
- Diptychophora ardalia Landry & Becker, 2021
- Diptychophora calliptera Tams, 1935
- Diptychophora desmoteria Meyrick, 1931
- Diptychophora diasticta Gaskin, 1986
- Diptychophora galvani Landry & Becker, 2021
- Diptychophora harlequinalis Barnes & McDunnough, 1914
- Diptychophora huixtla Landry, 1990
- Diptychophora incisalis Dyar, 1925
- Diptychophora kuhlweinii Zeller, 1866
- Diptychophora kuphitincta Lucas, 1898
- Diptychophora lojanalis (Dognin, 1905)
- Diptychophora minimalis Hampson, 1919
- Diptychophora mitis Meyrick, 1931
- Diptychophora muscella Fryer, 1912
- Diptychophora planaltina Landry & Becker, 2021
- Diptychophora powelli Landry, 1990
- Diptychophora subazanalis Bleszynski, 1967

== Former species ==
- Diptychophora minutalis Hampson, 1893
- Diptychophora strigatalis Hampson, 1900
