= Diptychophora mitis =

Scientific classification
- Kingdom: Animalia
- Phylum: Arthropoda
- Class: Insecta
- Order: Lepidoptera
- Family: Crambidae
- Subfamily: Crambinae
- Tribe: Diptychophorini
- Genus: Diptychophora
- Species: D. mitis

Binomial name
- Diptychophora mitis Meyrick, 1931

Species of moth

Diptychophora mitis is a moth in the family Crambidae. It was described by Edward Meyrick in 1931. It is found in Assam, India.
