= Jon Mathews =

American physicist (1932–1979)

Jon Mathews (1932–1979) was a physicist, yachtsman, scholar, and adventurer. After a 23-year career as a physics professor, he was lost at sea and presumed drowned during a circumnavigation attempt with his wife Jean in 1979.

== Early life and education ==
Mathews was born in Los Angeles, California, the son of John H. “Jack” Mathews, an attorney, and Grace Logie Mathews, a schoolteacher. His paternal grandfather was Los Angeles city attorney W.B. Mathews. He grew up in Hollywood, graduated from the Flintridge Preparatory School, and enrolled in Pomona College in 1948 at the age of 16. As a sophomore, he met Charlotte Dallett, a chemistry student. Mathews also played shortstop for two years on Pomona’s baseball team. In June 1952, Mathews and Charlotte were married. He then graduated summa cum laude in Mathematics.

Mathews received a Fulbright Scholarship, and moved with Charlotte to England for his year of study at the University of Cambridge. In 1953, he continued his graduate studies at the California Institute of Technology in Pasadena, earning a PhD in 1956.

== Academic career ==
After graduation, Mathews joined the Caltech staff. In 1959 he was an assistant professor of physics, in 1966 an Associate Professor and in 1970 he held the position of full professor.

In 1964, Mathews moved his family of six from Altadena, California, to Kanpur, India for a year while he participated in the Kanpur Indo-American Program (KIAP).

In 1964, Mathews and his Caltech contemporary, Dr. Robert Walker, co-authored and published Mathematical Methods of Physics, which received positive reviews and remains a widely used college textbook in 2014.

During his years at Caltech, Mathews authored a number of scientific papers.

Deepak Dhar was his Ph.D. student.

== Search and Rescue ==
Mathews also served on the Sierra Madre Search & Rescue Team from 1955 to 1962, using his climbing skills to rescue hikers and climbers in distress.

== Personal life ==
The marriage of Mathews and Charlotte lasted 22 years and produced four children. The pair separated in 1974 and divorced in 1977. Mathews married his second wife, Jean Box Vontobel, in October 1977.

Mathews participated in sailing, hiking, tennis, chess, music, and travel. He played piano and clarinet, and learned several languages, including Mandarin Chinese.

In June 1979, Mathews and his wife Jean left Marina del Rey, California, aboard their 34-foot yacht Drambuie II to begin a planned 12-month circumnavigation attempt. The Drambuie made port in Hawaii, Palmyra Island, American Samoa, and several ports in Australia. The pair departed Perth, Australia in November 1979, heading westward towards Durban, South Africa. On December 23, 1979, the Drambuie sailed into the path of Cyclone Claudette, a major storm with recorded wind gusts of over 150 knots. Radio contact was lost the next day. No trace of the Drambuie or its occupants was ever found.

== See also ==
- List of people who disappeared mysteriously at sea
