= Deepak Dhar =

Indian theoretical physicist (born 1951)

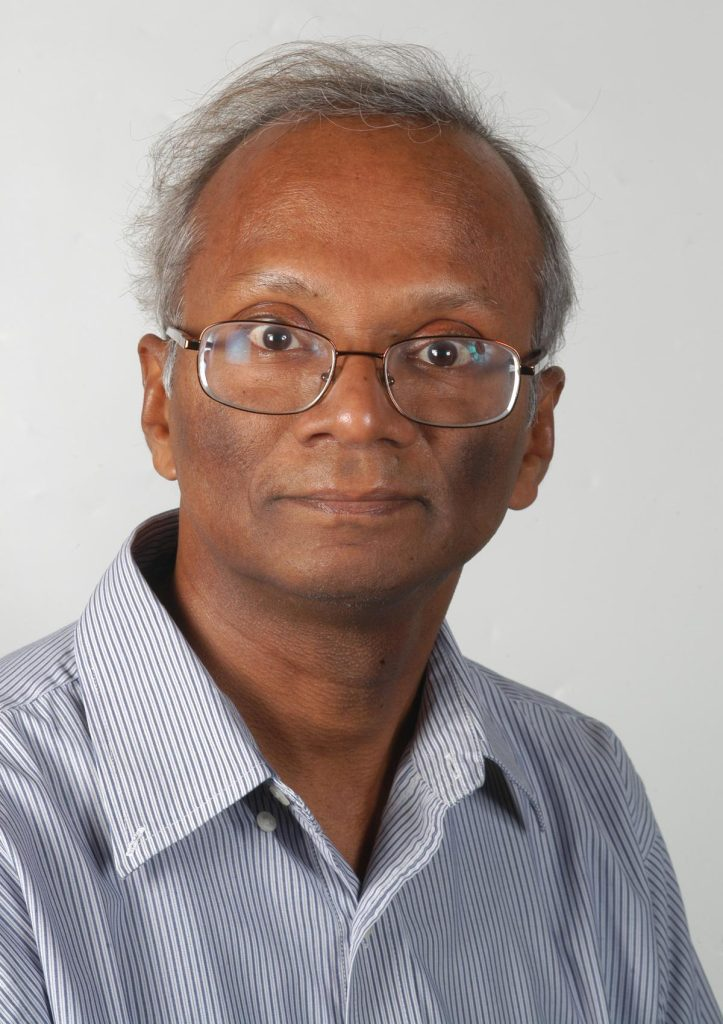
- Deepak Dhar
- Born: 30 October 1951 (age 75); Pratapgarh, Uttar Pradesh, India
- Education: University of Allahabad; IIT Kanpur; California Institute of Technology
- Known for: Abelian sandpile model (ASM)
- Awards: INSA Young Scientist Medal (1983); Shanti Swarup Bhatnagar Prize (1991); ICTP J. Robert Schrieffer Prize (1993); INSA S. N. Bose Medal (2001); TWAS Prize (2002); IITK Distinguished Alumni Award; Boltzmann Medal (2022); Padma Bhushan (2023); ICTP Dirac Medal (2026)
- Scientific career
- Fields: Theoretical physics; Statistical physics
- Workplaces: International Centre for Theoretical Sciences, Bengaluru; Indian Institute of Science Education and Research, Pune Tata Institute of Fundamental Research; University of Paris
- Doctoral advisor: Jon Mathews
- Doctoral students: Abhishek Dhar

Deepak Dhar (born 30 October 1951) is an Indian theoretical physicist known for his research on statistical physics and stochastic processes. In 2022, he became the first Indian to be awarded the Boltzmann Medal, the highest recognition in statistical physics awarded once every three years by IUPAP, for exceptional contributions to the subject. In 2026, he was awarded the ICTP Dirac Medal for his contributions to statistical mechanics.

Dhar has been awarded the Padma Bhushan in 2023. Dhar is a winner of the TWAS prize and also an elected fellow of The World Academy of Sciences. The Council of Scientific and Industrial Research, the apex agency of the Government of India for scientific research, awarded Dhar the Shanti Swarup Bhatnagar Prize for Science and Technology, one of the highest Indian science awards, for his contributions to physical sciences in 1991. (Note: Long link – please select award year to see details). He is an elected fellow of all three major Indian science academies – Indian Academy of Sciences, Indian National Science Academy and National Academy of Sciences, India. Currently, he is INSA Distinguished Professor at the International Centre for Theoretical Sciences (ICTS-TIFR), Bengaluru.

== Biography ==
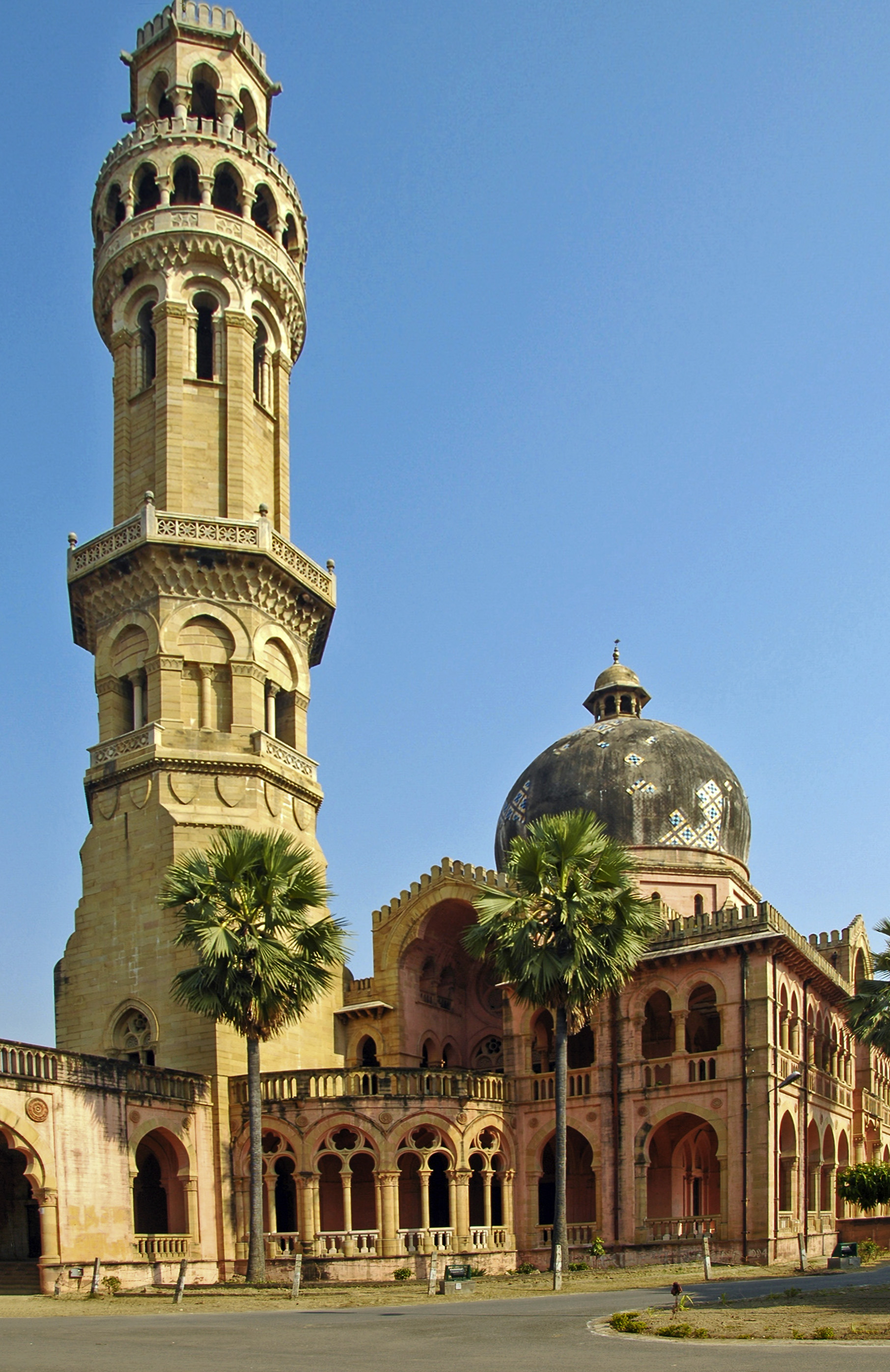
University of Allahabad

Deepak was born on 30 October 1951 at Pratapgarh, in the north Indian state of Uttar Pradesh to Murli Dhar and Rama Gupta. Dhar graduated in science from the University of Allahabad in 1970 before earning a master's degree in physics from the Indian Institute of Technology, Kanpur in 1972. Moving to the US, he enrolled for his doctoral studies under the guidance of Jon Mathews at California Institute of Technology, and after securing a PhD in 1978, returned to India to start his career as a research fellow at Tata Institute of Fundamental Research (TIFR) the same year. After two years of research, Dhar became a full-time fellow in 1980 and served in that position until 1986 when he was promoted as a reader. Before his superannuation from regular service, Dhar held various positions at TIFR, such as that of an associate professor (1991) and professor grades from G to J (1995–2008). In between, he had a one-year sabbatical at the University of Paris as a visiting scientist during 1984–85) and a month-long stint at Isaac Newton Institute in May 2006 as a Rothschild Professor. Post-retirement, Dhar served as a distinguished professor at the Indian Institute of Science Education and Research, Pune. He is currently serving as a faculty at the International Centre for Theoretical Sciences (ICTS-TIFR), Bengaluru.

Dhar is married to Manju and the couple has two daughters.

== Legacy ==
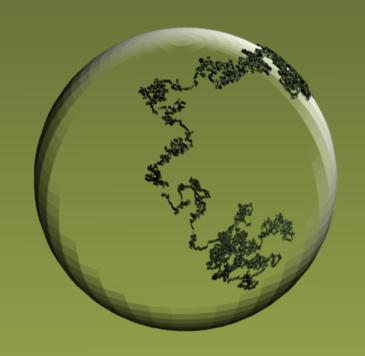
A computer-simulated realization of a Wiener or Brownian motion process (a continuous-time stochastic process) on the surface of a sphere

Focusing his studies on statistical physics and stochastic processes, Dhar has worked on the statistical mechanics and kinetics of random lattices and his work is reported to have widened our understanding of the disciplines. He is credited with the introduction of spectral dimension concept in the studies of fractals and contributed to developing a methodology for determining their critical phenomena using real-space renormalization group techniques which was the first time the mathematical apparatus was used for calculations on nontrivial critical exponents on fractals. Dhar worked with Ramakrishna Ramaswamy to solve the Abelian sandpile model of self-organized criticality and developed a new model which came to be known as Dhar-Ramaswamy model. Working on directed-site animals-enumeration problem using Bethe ansatz method, he proposed the evolution operator which has since been subjected to studies by other researchers as Dhar directed-site animals-enumeration problem. Dhar also demonstrated the predominance of slow flipping of isolated unfrustrated clusters in auto-correlation functions and proposed models of metastable glassy states in stochastic evolution. His studies have been documented by way of a number of articles (Note: Please see Selected bibliography section) and the online article repository of Indian Academy of Sciences has listed 113 of them.

Dhar is an associate editor of Journal of Statistical Physics, a Springer publication since 2005 where he sat in the editorial board on two previous terms (1993–96 and 1999–2002). He is an editorial board member of the Indian Journal of Pure and Applied Physics (IJPAP) of the National Institute of Science Communication and Information Resources (NISCAIR), a former editorial adviser to Physica A, an Elsevier science journal, and has been associated with journals such as Journal of Statistical Mechanics: Theory and Experiment, Physical Review E and Pramana as an editorial board member. He was a member of the Commission on Statistical Physics of the International Union of Pure and Applied Physics from 1992 to 1995 and is a member of the program committee of the International Centre for Theoretical Sciences. Dhar has also delivered invited speeches and the special lecture on The Curious Relationship Between Physics and Mathematics at the University of Mumbai on 19 October 2016 was one among them.

== Awards and honors ==
During his doctoral days at Caltech, Dhar held two institutional fellowships; E. P. Anthony fellowship (1972–73) and R. P. Feynman fellowship (1974–76). He received the Young Scientist Medal of the Indian National Science Academy in 1983. The Council of Scientific and Industrial Research awarded him the Shanti Swarup Bhatnagar Prize, one of the highest Indian science awards in 1991. Two years later, International Centre for Theoretical Physics selected him for the 1993 J. Robert Schrieffer Prize. INSA honored Dhar again in 2001 with the Satyendranath Bose Medal and he received the TWAS Prize of The World Academy of Sciences in 2002.

Dhar was elected as a fellow by the Indian Academy of Sciences in 1990 where he is a sitting council member. He became an elected fellow of the Indian National Science Academy on 1995 and the National Academy of Sciences, India elected him as a fellow in 1999. Dhar received the elected fellowship of the World Academy of Sciences in 2006 and was selected for the J. C. Bose National fellowship of the Science and Engineering Research Board in 2007, with the tenure running until 2017.

Dhar was chosen for the prestigious Boltzmann Medal award for the year 2022 and became the first Indian to receive the honor. It is bestowed upon a scientist with exceptional contributions in the field of statistical physics, every three year. Dhar shares his prize with John Hopfield. He received the 2023 Padma Bhushan, the third highest civilian award by Government of India.

In 2026, Deepak Dhar won the prestigious Dirac Medal awarded by ICTP. He shares the prize alonwith other three scientists "for their pioneering contributions to equilibrium statistical mechanics and for extending its concepts and methods into non-equilibrium statistical mechanics, optimization problems, theoretical neuroscience, and, finally, artificial intelligence".

== Selected bibliography ==
- Deepak Dhar (1983). "Exact Solution of a Directed-Site Animals-Enumeration Problem in Three Dimensions". Phys. Rev. Lett. 51 (10): 853–856. Bibcode:1983PhRvL..51..853D. doi:10.1103/PhysRevLett.51.853.
- Deepak Dhar, Ramakrishna Ramaswamy (1989). "Exactly solved model of self-organized critical phenomena". Phys. Rev. Lett. 63 (1659): 1659–1662. Bibcode:1989PhRvL..63.1659D. doi:10.1103/PhysRevLett.63.1659. PMID 10040637. S2CID 9637234.
- D Dhar, S N Majumdar (1990). "Abelian sandpile model on the Bethe lattice". Journal of Physics A: Mathematical and General. 23 (4333): 4333–4350. Bibcode:1990JPhA...23.4333D. doi:10.1088/0305-4470/23/19/018.
- Deepak Dhar (1990). "Self-organized critical state of sandpile automaton models". Phys. Rev. Lett. 64 (14): 1613–1616. Bibcode:1990PhRvL..64.1613D. doi:10.1103/PhysRevLett.64.1613. PMID 10041442.
- Deepak Dhar (1999). "The Abelian sandpile and related models". Physica A: Statistical Mechanics and Its Applications. 263 (1–4): 4–25. arXiv:cond-mat/9808047. Bibcode:1999PhyA..263....4D. doi:10.1016/S0378-4371(98)00493-2. S2CID 11091203.

== See also ==
- Lattice model (physics)
