= Tokamak Chauffage Alfvén Brésilien =

Tokamak at the University of Sao Paulo, Brazil

TCABR
Tokamak Chauffage Alfvén Brésilien
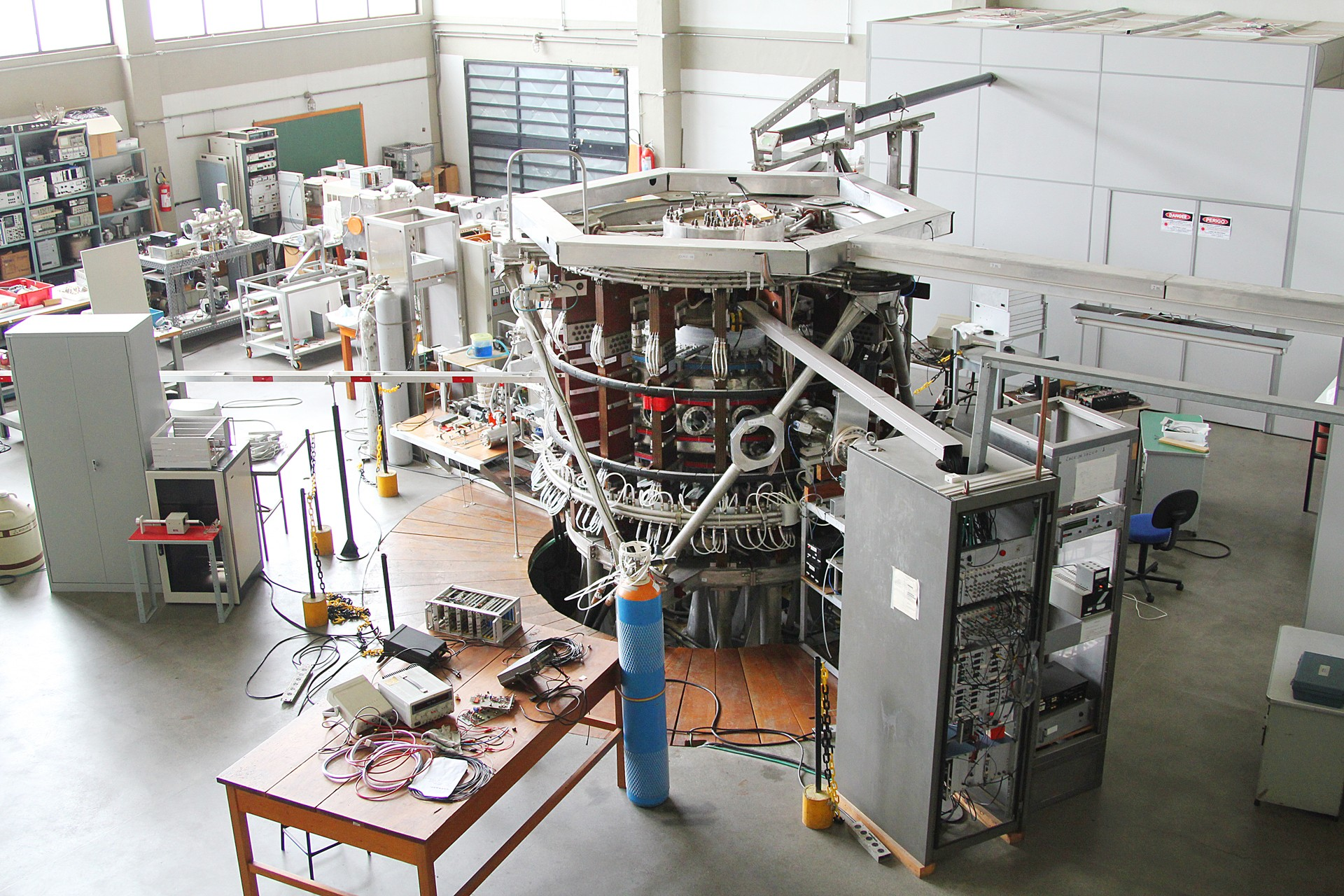
- The TCABR tokamak at the University of São Paulo.
- Device type: Tokamak
- Location: São Paulo, São Paulo, Brazil
- Affiliation: University of São Paulo (IFUSP)

Technical specifications
- Major radius: 0.615 m (2 ft 0.2 in)
- Minor radius: 0.18 m (7.1 in)
- Plasma volume: 0.39 m^{3}
- Magnetic field: 1.1 T
- Heating power: Alfvén wave, Ohmic heating
- Plasma current: 100 kA
- Plasma temperature: 650 eV

History
- Year(s) of operation: 1999–present
- Preceded by: TCA (EPFL, Switzerland): 1980-1992

Links
- Website: portal.if.usp.br/fnc/

The Tokamak Chauffage Alfvén Brésilien (TCABR) is a tokamak situated at the University of São Paulo (USP), Brazil. TCABR is the largest tokamak in the southern hemisphere and one of the magnetic-confinement devices committed to advancing scientific knowledge in fusion power.

== History ==
Operating from 1980 to 1992 in Switzerland, the Tokamak Chauffage Alfvén (TCA) was specifically engineered to explore plasma heating with Alfvén wavew at the Centre de Recherches en Physique des Plasmas (CRPP) of the École Polytechnique Fédérale de Lausanne (EPFL). When the CRPP transitioned its focus toward the larger Tokamak à Configuration Variable (TCV), the TCA was decommissioned and offered for donation to the international fusion scientific community. In 1994, the machine was transferred to USP, passing through an upgrade and adding Brésilien to its name. The operation of TCABR began in 1999.

== Properties ==
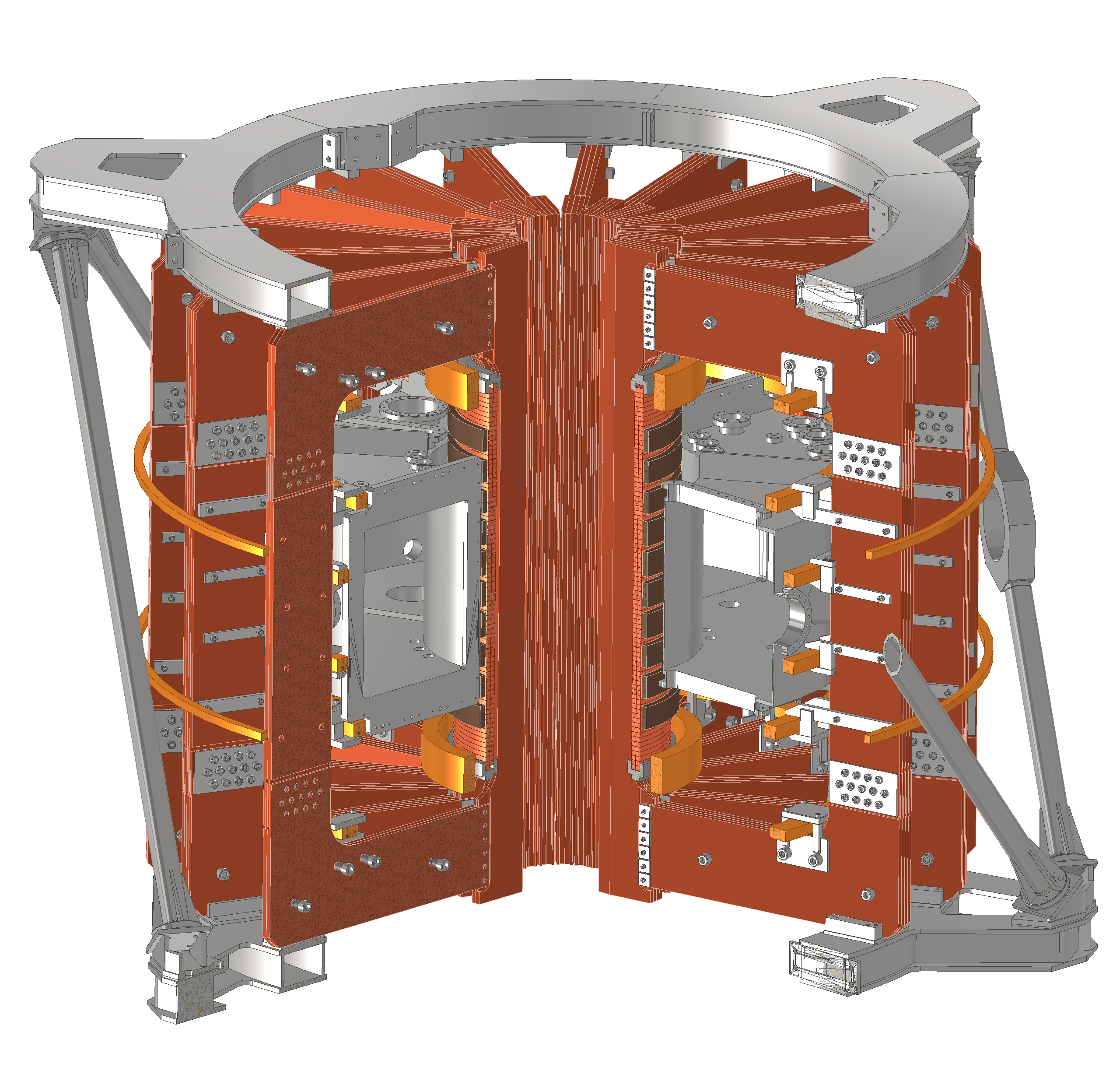
3D virtual model of the TCABR tokamak.

The TCABR plasma is made of hydrogen and has a circular format. In general, its discharges are ohmically heated and the plasma current in TCABR reaches up to $I_P \leq 100\ \text{kA}$. The minor and major radii of TCABR are respectively $a=18.0\;\text{cm}$ and $R=61.5\;\text{cm}$, giving an aspect ratio of $A=R/a=3.4$. The TCABR central electron temperature is around $k_{B} T_{e} \leq 650 \ \text{eV}$ (i.e., $T_{e}\sim6\times10^{6}\;\text{K}$) and its mean electron density is $0.9\leq\bar{n}_{e0}\leq3$, in units of $10^{19}\;\text{m}^{-3}$. Other parameters of TCABR include the toroidal magnetic field, $B_{0}\sim1.1\;\text{T},$ the hydrogen filling pressure, $P_{H}\simeq3\times10^{-4}\;\text{Pa}$, a discharge duration of $T_{D}\simeq100\;\text{ms}$, and a steady-phase duration around $T\leq60\;\text{ms}$.

Parameters of TCABR
Parameter	Symbol	Value
Plasma format		Circular
Plasma composition	H	Hydrogen
Major radius	$R_0$	$61.5\text{ cm}$
Minor radius	$a$	$18.0\text{ cm}$
Aspect ratio ($R_0/a$)	$A$	$3.4$
Plasma current	$I_p$	$\leq 100\ \text{kA}$
Central (or toroidal) magnetic field	$B_0$	$\sim 1.1\ \text{T}$
Line-averaged electronic density	$\overline{n}_{e0}$	$0.9\sim3\times10^{19}\ \text{m}^{-3}$
Central electronic temperature	$k_BT_{e0}$	$\sim 0.5\ \text{keV}$
Hydrogen filling pressure	$P_H$	$1\sim 3\times10^{-2}\ \text{Pa}$
Discharge duration	$T_D$	$\simeq 100\ \text{ms}$
Duration of the steady phase	$T$	$\leq 60\ \text{ms}$

== Research program ==
The current purpose of the TCABR tokamak includes the study of Alfvén waves, but is not restricted to it. Other research areas are (i) the characterization of magnetohydrodynamic (MHD) instabilities, (ii) the study of high-confinement regimes induced by electrical polarization of external electrodes in the plasma edge, (iii) the investigation of edge turbulence, and (iv) the study of plasma poloidal and toroidal rotation using optical diagnostics. The TCABR team is also associated with a theoretical group focused on investigating instabilities and transport barriers in tokamaks and dynamical systems.

An upgrade in the TCABR is also being conducted. A set of 108 RMP coils will be installed to control and study edge localized modes (ELMs). New shaping coils will be added, allowing great flexibility in plasma configurations (e.g. single null, double null, snowflake, and negative triangularity configurations). The vacuum-vessel inner wall of TCABR will receive graphite tiles to decrease impurity deposition and energy loss in the plasma.
