= Spenta R. Wadia =

Indian physicist

Spenta R. Wadia (born 1 August 1950) is an Indian theoretical physicist with research interests in elementary particle physics, quantum field theory and statistical physics, string theory and quantum gravity. His other scientific interests are in complex systems including cross-disciplinary biology. He is a recipient of the 2004 TWAS Prize in Physics; the 1995 Physics Prize of the International Centre for Theoretical Physics (ICTP); and the J. C. Bose Fellowship of the Govt of India. He is an elected member of TWAS, and a Fellow of all the Science Academies of India. In 2024, he was elected to the American Academy of Arts and Sciences, one of the United States' oldest and most prestigious scholarly societies.

== Career ==
He is an alumnus of St Mary's High School Mumbai, St Xavier's College Mumbai and IIT-Kanpur. He graduated from the City University of New York in 1978 (mentor Bunji Sakita) and his postdoctoral work at the University of Chicago (mentors Yoichiro Nambu and Leo Kadanoff). He joined the faculty of the Tata Institute of Fundamental Research (TIFR) in Mumbai in 1982 and worked there till 2015. He was the Chair of the Dept of Theoretical Physics 2007–2009, Distinguished Professor 2008-2015 and is the Founder Director of the International Centre for Theoretical Sciences (ICTS) of TIFR in Bangalore. Presently he is the Infosys Homi Bhabha Chair Professor at ICTS. He was a visiting member of the Institute for Advanced Study at Princeton, USA during 1990–1992; Centre European Recherché Nuclear (CERN) in Geneva, during 1996-1997 and 2003–2004; KITP Simons Distinguished Visiting Scholar 2018.

== Contribution to Indian and International Science ==
He conceived and executed (with the contribution of many colleagues) the International Centre for Theoretical Sciences of TIFR. This institution through its programs, research and outreach activities is having an impact on Indian science and education. He also contributed significantly to the building of the Department of Theoretical Physics of TIFR, especially the string theory group.

He is one of the founding members of i) the Asian Winter School on "Strings, Particles and Cosmology", a meeting that is held sequentially every year since 2007 in Korea, Japan, China, and India; ii) the "Crete Regional Meeting in String theory" held biennially since 2001 where physicists from Iran, Israel, India and other countries of the Middle East meet. He was one of the main organizers of Strings 2001 in Mumbai and Strings 2015 in Bangalore. In his role as a member of the "Committee for International Scientific Affairs" of the American Physical Society, he has enabled several joint events with the Indian Physics Association and other institutions in India.

Nationally as well as internationally, he continues to play a leadership role through his involvement in multiple advisory boards of scientific institutions like the ICTP-Chinese Academy of Sciences, Beijing and the International Institute of Physics, Brazil. In his role as a member of the "Committee for International Scientific Affairs" of the American Physical Society, he has enabled several joint events and collaborations with the Indian Physics Association and other institutions in India.

He is the Chair of the Advisory Committee of the Bengaluru Science and Technology Cluster set up by the Govt of India, where science institutions, government labs and private industry meet to provide solution to some socially relevant problems like OneHealth, climate change and nationally aspirational projects like the design and manufacture of a turbofan jet engine in India.

== Research ==
Spenta Wadia has made significant contributions to high energy physics and quantum gravity, that include i) the observation that global gauges like the Coulomb gauge cannot be fixed in a non-abelian gauge theory; ii) the discovery of the large N, 3rd order phase transition in soluble models of low dim lattice gauge theory (called the Gross-Witten-Wadia transition); iii) for the exact closed equations for Wilson loops in a lattice gauge theory; iv) for the first proposal of a Nambu-Jona-Lasinio type phenomenological non-linear fermion model for QCD that describes all low energy properties of low-lying mesons, including their anomalous interactions; v) for the discovery of the black hole solution of 2-dim string theory; vi) for the exact bosonization of non-relativistic fermions using the co-adjoint orbits of the W(infinity) algebra; vii) for extending the D-brane model of Strominger and Vafa to near extremal black holes that emit Hawking radiation and demonstrating the rate calculated in this model matched Hawking's calculation in gravity; vii) for dualities involving the partition function and S-matrix of fermions and bosons coupled to 2+1 dim Chern-Simons theories; viii) for the first detailed study of black hole formation and evaporation within the Sachdev-Ye-Kitaev model that is a holographic description of black holes in 2-dim gravity, that effectively describes 4-dim near extremal black holes.
