= International Centre for Theoretical Physics =

Research center in Trieste, Italy

Coordinates: 45.702618°N 13.718297°E

Abdus Salam International Centre for Theoretical Physics
- Type: Research institute
- Established: 1964; 62 years ago
- Founder: Mohammad Abdus Salam
- Director: Atish Dabholkar
- Location: Trieste, Italy
- Website: ictp.it

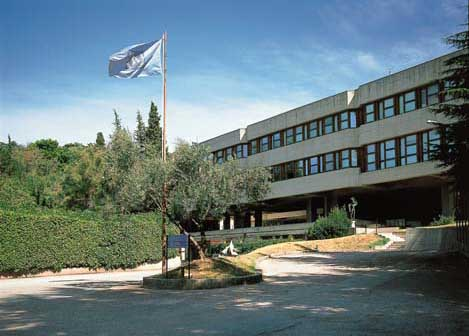
ICTP in 2006

The Abdus Salam International Centre for Theoretical Physics (ICTP) is a research center for physical and mathematical sciences, located in Trieste, Friuli-Venezia Giulia, Italy.

The center operates under a tripartite agreement between the Government of Italy, UNESCO, and the International Atomic Energy Agency. It is located near Miramare Park, about 10 kilometres from the downtown of Trieste, Italy. The centre was founded in 1964 by Pakistani Nobel laureate Mohammad Abdus Salam.

ICTP is part of the Trieste System, a network of national and international scientific institutes in Trieste, promoted by the Italian physicist Paolo Budinich.

== Mission ==
- Foster the growth of advanced studies and research in physical and mathematical sciences, especially in support of excellence in developing countries;
- Develop high-level scientific programmes keeping in mind the needs of developing countries, and provide an international forum of scientific contact for scientists from all countries;
- Conduct research at the highest international standards and maintain a conducive environment of scientific inquiry for the entire ICTP community.

== Research ==
Research at ICTP is carried out by seven scientific sections:

- High Energy, Cosmology and Astroparticle Physics
- Condensed Matter and Statistical Physics
- Mathematics
- Earth System Physics
- Science, Technology and Innovation
- Quantitative Life Sciences
- New Research Areas (which includes studies related to Energy and Sustainability and Computing Sciences)

The scientific community at ICTP includes staff research scientists, postdoctoral fellows and long- and short-term visitors engaged in independent or collaborative research. Throughout the year, the sections organize conferences, workshops, seminars and colloquiums in their respective fields. ICTP also has visitor programmes specifically for scientific visitors from developing countries, including programmes under federation and associateship schemes.

== Postgraduate programmes ==
ICTP offers educational training through its pre-PhD programmes and degree programmes (conducted in collaboration with other institutes).

Pre-PhD programmes

- Postgraduate diploma programmes in Condensed Matter Physics, High Energy Physics, Mathematics, Earth System Physics, and Quantitative Life Sciences for students from developing countries.
- The Sandwich Training Educational Programme (STEP) for students from developing countries already enrolled in PhD programmes in the fields of physics and mathematics.

In collaboration with other institutes, ICTP offers masters and doctoral degrees in physics and mathematics.

- Joint ICTP/SISSA PhD Programme in Physics and Mathematics
- Joint PhD Programme in Earth Science and Fluid Mechanics
- International Master, Physics of Complex Systems
- Master of Advanced Studies in Medical Physics
- Masters in High Performance Computing

In addition, ICTP collaborates with local laboratories, including Elettra Synchrotron Light Laboratory, to provide fellowships and laboratory opportunities.

== Prizes and awards ==
ICTP has instituted awards to honour and encourage high-level research in the fields of physics and mathematics.

- The Dirac Medal – For scientists who have made significant contributions to theoretical physics.
- The ICTP Prize – For young scientists from and working in developing countries.
- ICO/ICTP Gallieno Denardo Award – For significant contributions to the field of optics.
- The Ramanujan Prize – For young mathematicians from developing countries.
- The Walter Kohn Prize – Given jointly by ICTP and the Quantum ESPRESSO foundation, for work in quantum mechanical materials or molecular modelling, performed by a young scientist working in a developing country.

== Partner institutes ==
One of ICTP's goals is to set up regional centres of excellence around the globe. The idea is to bring ICTP's unique blend of high-quality physics and mathematics education and high-level science meetings closer to scientists everywhere. On February 6, 2012, ICTP opened a partner institute (ICTP South American Institute for Fundamental Research) in São Paulo, Brazil. Its activities are modelled on those of the ICTP and include schools and workshops, as well as a visiting scientists programme.

On October 18, 2018, a partner institute (ICTP-EAIFR, the East African Institute for Fundamental Research), was inaugurated in Kigali, Rwanda. In November 2018, ICTP opened the International Centre for Theoretical Physics Asia-Pacific (ICTP-AP) in Beijing, China, in collaboration with the University of the Chinese Academy of Sciences.

== See also ==
- International School for Advanced Studies
- University of Trieste
- Joint Institute for Nuclear Research
- Institute for Theoretical Physics (disambiguation)
- Center for Theoretical Physics (disambiguation)
