= Quantum computing in India =

India's quantum computer

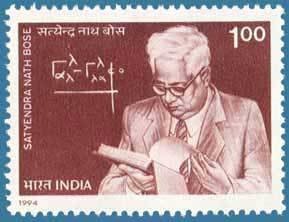
Stamp of India in the memory of the Indian quantum physicist Satyendra Nath Bose

Quantum computing in India can be traced back to the period of Indian theoretical physicist Satyendra Nath Bose, whose last four publications on quantum statistics and condensed matter physics led to the foundation of quantum mechanics.

In the next five years, India is expected to invest around $1 billion in programs related to the development of quantum computing. The Government of India has launched an initiative called the National Quantum Mission to develop quantum computing technology, being one of seven countries to do so. The union defence minister Rajnath Singh emphasized the development of quantum computing during the ceremony of 16th foundation day of Indian Institute Technology, Mandi.

== History ==
=== 2018 ===
In 2018, India launched the Quantum Enabled Science and Technology (QuEST) program, which funded 51 national quantum labs with a budget of ₹250 crore to develop the required infrastructure for the development of quantum technology.

=== 2020 ===
In 2020, the Government of India announced a budget of ₹8,000 crore for the development of quantum technologies and its applications. In the same year, the government launched a National Mission on Quantum Technologies and Applications (NM-QTA) for a period of five years. The mission was to be implemented by the Department of Science & Technology (DST) of the government. After the mission was announced, it was delayed for four years with no further progress.

=== 2021 ===
The Ministry of Electronics and Information Technology (MeitY), in collaboration with Amazon Web Services (AWS), established a quantum computing applications lab to facilitate research and development related to quantum computing in January 2021. Similarly, in March, the Department of Science and Technology and 13 research groups from the Indian Institute of Science Education and Research (IISER) launched the I-HUB Quantum Technology Foundation (I-HUB QTF) at Pune for the development of quantum technologies.

On 22 March, the Indian Space Research Organisation (ISRO) successfully demonstrated free-space quantum communication over a distance of 300 metres. A number of indigenous key technologies were developed to achieve it. It used the indigenous NAVIC receiver for time synchronization between the transmitter and receiver modules, and gimbal mechanism systems. A live videoconference was demonstrated using a quantum key distribution link. It was demonstrated at the campus of Space Applications Centre (SAC) in Ahmedabad. The demonstration was between the two line-of-sight buildings within the campus. It was conducted at night to prevent the interference of the direct sunlight in the demonstration. The experiment is considered a major achievement of ISRO towards the goal of demonstrating satellite-based quantum communications.

In July, the Defence Institute of Advanced Technology (DIAT) and the Centre for Development of Advanced Computing (C-DAC) collaborated to develop quantum computers. In August, a quantum computer simulator (QSim) toolkit was launched for academics, industry professionals, students and the scientific community. It was launched to provide an environment for the development of quantum technology and allow researchers to write and debug quantum code necessary for quantum algorithms. In October, the Centre for Development of Telematics (C-DOT) unveiled a quantum key distribution solution to support more than 100 kilometers on standard optical fiber, and launched a quantum communication lab. In December, a quantum computing laboratory and an AI center were established by the Indian Army at its engineering college in Madhya Pradesh, which was backed by the National Security Council Secretariate (NSCS).

=== 2022 ===
In April 2022, DRDO and Indian Institute of Technology Delhi researchers successfully demonstrated a quantum key distribution link for more than 100 kilometers. The scientists used existing commercial-grade fiber-optic networks between Prayagraj and Vindhyachal in Uttar Pradesh to demonstrate the QKD link.

=== 2023 ===
On 27 March 2023, the Union Telecom Minister Ashwini Vaishnava announced at India's first international quantum enclave that the country's first quantum computing-based telecommunications network link is operational between the Sanchar Bhawan and the National Informatics Centre office at the CGO Complex in New Delhi.

On 19 April, the government revised the budget to ₹6,003.65 crore and launched the National Quantum Mission for a period from 2023-24 to 2030-31. Ajai Chowdhry, the co-founder of HCL was appointed as the chairman of the NQM's Mission Governing Board. With the mission's announcement, India became the seventh country after the US, Austria, Finland, France, Canada and China to have a dedicated national mission for the development of quantum technologies. The National Quantum Mission in India is one of nine missions of national importance under the Prime Minister's Science and Technology Innovation Advisory Council (PM-STIAC).

=== 2024 ===
In January 2024, the National Quantum Mission issued a call for proposals, inviting academic and research institutions to contribute to the development of technology in the areas of quantum computing, communication, sensing and metrology, and materials and devices. The initiative received 384 submissions from across the country.

On 28 August, scientists at the DRDO Young Scientists Laboratory for Quantum Technologies (DYSL-QT) in Pune and the Tata Institute of Fundamental Research in Mumbai completed end-to-end testing of a 6-qubit quantum processor based on superconducting circuit technology. This project was completed via the collaborative efforts of DYSL-QT, TIFR, and Tata Consultancy Services (TCS). The control and measurement apparatus for the quantum processor was developed by the team of DYSL-QT at Pune. It uses a combination of off-the-shelf electronics and custom-programmed development boards. Similarly, a novel ring-resonator architecture was invented by the team of Tata Institute of Fundamental Research at their campus. It was employed in designing and fabrication of the qubits. The contribution of the team of Tata Consultancy Services was in the development of the cloud-based interface for the quantum hardware.

On 30 September, the National Quantum Mission announced four thematic hubs. They have four verticals, which are quantum computing, quantum communication, quantum sensing and metrology, and quantum materials and devices. The Indian Institute of Science in Bangalore was made a thematic hub for quantum computing, and Indian Institute of Technology Madras was selected for quantum communication. Similarly, the Indian Institute of Technology Bombay and the Indian Institute of Technology Delhi were made Thematic Hubs for quantum sensing and metrology, and quantum materials and devices, respectively.

Thematic hubs announced by the National Quantum Mission
Theme	Hub
Quantum computing	Indian Institute of Science
Quantum comunication	IIT Madras
Quantum sensing and metrology	IIT Bombay
Quantum materials and devices	IIT Delhi

=== 2025 ===
In April 2025, the startup QpiAi unveiled a 25 qubit superconducting quantum computer named Indus, which is the first full-stack quantum computing system in the country selected under the National Quantum Mission. Its launch was announced on World Quantum Day.

In May 2025, the Quantum Valley Tech Park was established in Amaravati, Andhra Pradesh, to develop India's quantum industry, and is the country's first quantum technology park. The construction of the Quantum Valley Tech Park's main block and auxiliary infrastructure is being undertaken by Larsen & Toubro, and the park was scheduled to open in January 2026.

== Planning ==
According to Ajai Chowdhry, the chairman of the Mission Governing Body of the National Quantum Mission, India's first quantum computer would be of capacity to achieve computation of 6 qubits and was expected to be built within the period of one year or a few months. There have been plans to build a 20–50-qubit quantum computer within the next three years, a 50–100-qubit quantum computer in the next five years, and a 50–1,000-qubit quantum computer in the next ten years.

Other planned developments include:

- Secure satellite-based quantum communications up to distances of 2,000 kilometres between ground stations within the country
- Long-distance secure quantum satellite and fibre-based communications with other countries by both satellite and fibre-based
- A multi-node quantum network to implement inter-city quantum key distribution for covering distances of over 2,000 kilometres
- Atomic clocks and magnetometers for precision navigation

The startup QpiAI also plans to build a 64-qubit quantum computer called Kaveri, a 128-qubit quantum computer called Ganges, and a 1,000-qubit quantum computer called Everest.

== Research and development ==
According to professor R. Vijayaraghavan of the Tata Institute of Fundamental Research Mumbai, the institute has demonstrated a 3-qubit quantum computer based on superconducting qubits.

C-DAC is building a quantum computing center at its campus in Bangalore with the help of the National Quantum Mission. It is called a quantum reference facility. The project of the quantum reference facility has three components. These are importing components, assembling, and developing software and applications. It is expected that the quantum reference facility will be completed and fully operational in the next three years.

The Indian Institute of Technology Mandi is developing an indigenous room-temperature quantum computer at its Center for Quantum Science and Technologies (CQST) with the assistance of the National Quantum Mission. The quantum computer will use photons for faster calculations. According to the official of the institute, it is expected that the room-temperature optical quantum computer will have a "unique ability to analyse data and suggest solutions with 86 per cent accuracy without using traditional algorithms". Similarly, "instead of CPU, the quantum computer will operate as a graphics processor (GPU) with a sophisticated user interface, quantum simulator and quantum processing capabilities in place".

The Raman Research Institute in Bangalore has established the Quantum Information and Computing (QuIC) lab, which is headed by professor Urbasi Sinha and is working towards photonic quantum science and technologies. It is one of the first laboratories in India to manufacture and use heralded and entangled photon sources in various applications in quantum technologies. The researchers of the QuIC lab built a quantum random number generator that produced around 1 million certified random bits. In 2025, the same process was tested on a commercial quantum computer from IBM.

== Startups ==
In the race to develop quantum technologies, some startups in India are emerging to boost research and development projects of quantum computing in India. Bangalore-based startup company QpiAI was founded in 2019 to make advancements in quantum computing and generative AI technologies. It was founded by Nagendra Nagaraja, who is presently the CEO of the company. The company planned to build a 25-qubit quantum computer at its headquarters in Bangalore very soon.

Similarly, another quantum computing startup company, BosonQ Psi, was also established in Bangalore. It is a simulation software company utilizing quantum computing. It was named after Indian quantum physicist Satyendra Nath Bose and the fundamental quantity Psi. It is also onboard with the US-based IT company IBM's quantum networks.

The Government of India, under its two flagship initiatives, the National Quantum Mission and the National Mission on Interdisciplinary Cyber-Physical Systems, has selected eight major startups for the innovation of advanced technologies in the areas of quantum computing, communication, sensing, and advanced materials. These eight major startups are:

1. QNu Labs (Bengaluru)
2. QPiAI India Private Limited (Bengaluru)
3. Dimira Technologies Private Limited (IIT Mumbai)
4. Prenishq Private Limited (IIT Delhi)
5. QuPrayog Private Limited (Pune)
6. Quanastra Private Limited (Delhi)
7. Pristine Diamonds Private Limited (Ahmedabad)
8. Quan2D Technologies Private Limited (Bengaluru)

The eight startups have been given responsibilities for the development of various technologies. QNu Labs represents the development of quantum communication and specializes in developing quantum-safe heterogeneous networks that prevent cyber threats. Similarly, QPiAI India represents the development of superconducting quantum computing and is building a superconducting quantum computer which will contribute towards development of scalable and high-performance quantum systems.

Dimira Technologies and Prenishq are developing essential quantum computing hardware. Dimira Technologies is also developing indigenous cryogenic cables, which are critical for maintaining the low-temperature environments required for quantum hardware. Similarly, Prenishq is developing precision diode-laser systems which are essential for quantum computing and sensing technologies. QuPrayog and Quanastra are working on quantum sensing technologies. QuPrayog is also working on innovations to optical atomic clocks and related quantum metrology technologies, which have potential applications in healthcare and precise timekeeping. Quanastra is also developing advanced cryogenic systems and superconducting detectors to support quantum sensing and communication efforts.

Pristine Diamonds and Quan2D Technologies are developing quantum materials and photon detection technology. Pristine Diamonds is also working towards designing diamond-based materials for quantum sensing. Similarly, Quan2D Technologies is developing superconducting nanowire single-photon detectors to enhance quantum communication capabilities.

== See also ==
- Amaravati Quantum Valley
