= Aninda Sinha =

Indian physicist

- Born: West Bengal, India
- Education: University of Cambridge; Jadavpur University
- Occupation: Professor
- Spouse: Urbasi Sinha
- Awards: ICTP Prize; Shanti Swarup Bhatnagar Prize; Asian Scientist 100
- Scientific career
- Fields: Physics
- Workplaces: Indian Institute of Science
- Doctoral advisor: Michael Green

Aninda Sinha is an Indian theoretical physicist working as a professor at Center for High Energy Physics, Indian Institute of Science in Bangalore, India.

== Early life and education ==
Sinha finished his schooling from Don Bosco Park Circus, Kolkata. He obtained his B.Sc. From Jadavpur University, Kolkata in 1999, and MA, CASM and PhD from University of Cambridge. Sinha ranked first in B.Sc. and won the Mayhew prize for the part III mathematics degree in University of Cambridge. His PhD advisor was Professor Michael Green. He is a member of the Kandi Raj family and is the son of late Atish Chandra Sinha.

== Career ==
Sinha is a professor at Center for High Energy Physics, Indian Institute of Science in Bangalore, India. He was awarded a Ramanujan Fellowship in 2010 He was awarded the Swarnajayanti Fellowship, instituted by the Department of Science and Technology, India. Sinha won the 2016 ICTP Prize. He received the Shanti Swarup Bhatnagar Prize for Science and Technology 2019 for his influential work on aspects of quantum field theory and string theory, in particular, on conformal bootstrap and entanglement entropy. Sinha is known for his work with Rob Myers on c-theorems in quantum field theories. Sinha and his wife, Urbasi Sinha, a professor at the Raman Research Institute (RRI), along with other scientists in RRI working in similar areas set up a tabletop experiment that will provide scientists their first opportunity to measure the probability that particles can move through slits in a twisted path. Subsequently, this prediction has been verified experimentally.

== Research interests ==
- Theoretical physics
- Quantum field theory
- Conformal field theory
- General relativity
- String theory
