= Bras d'Eau National Park =

National park in Mauritius

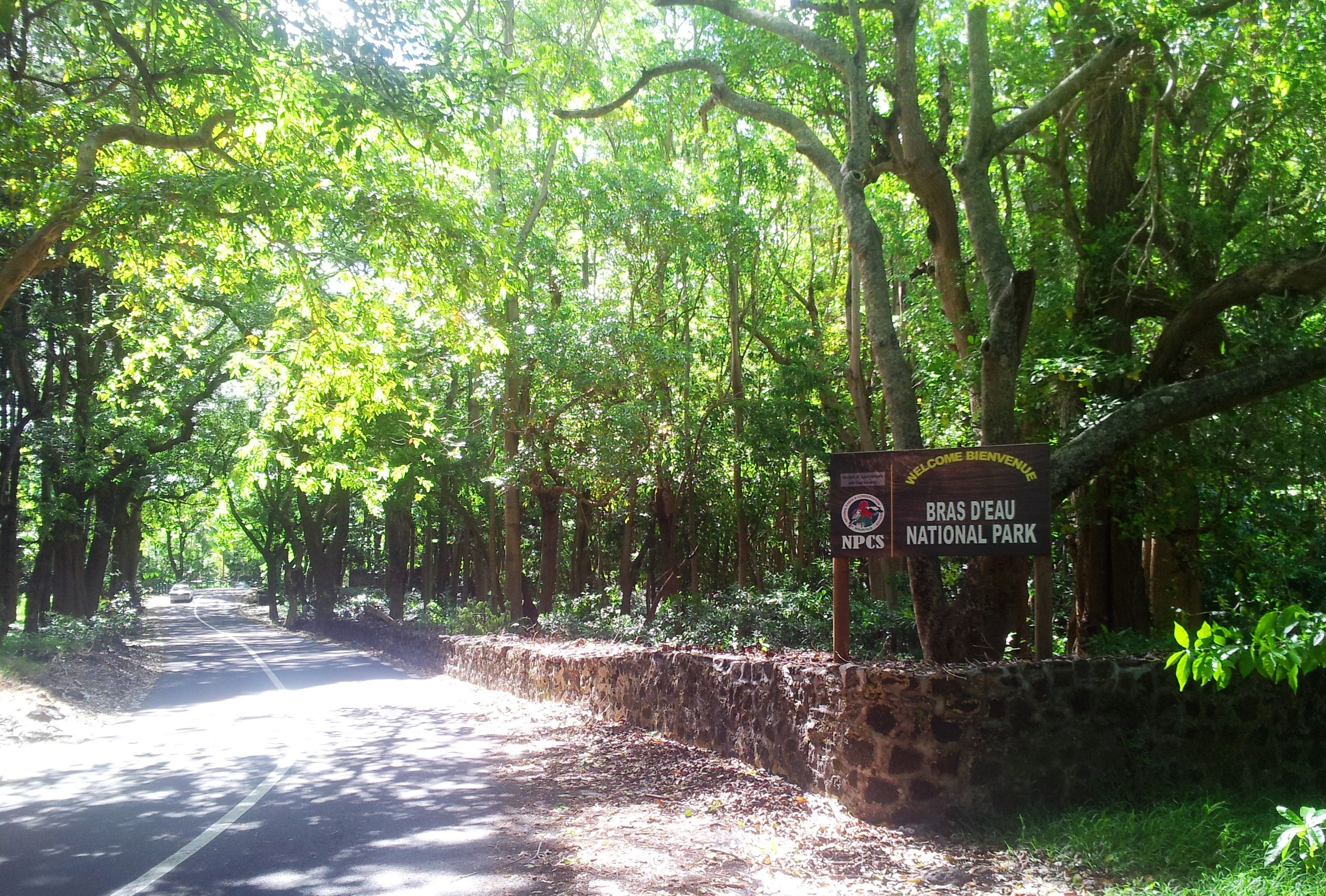
- Entrance to Bras d'Eau National Park

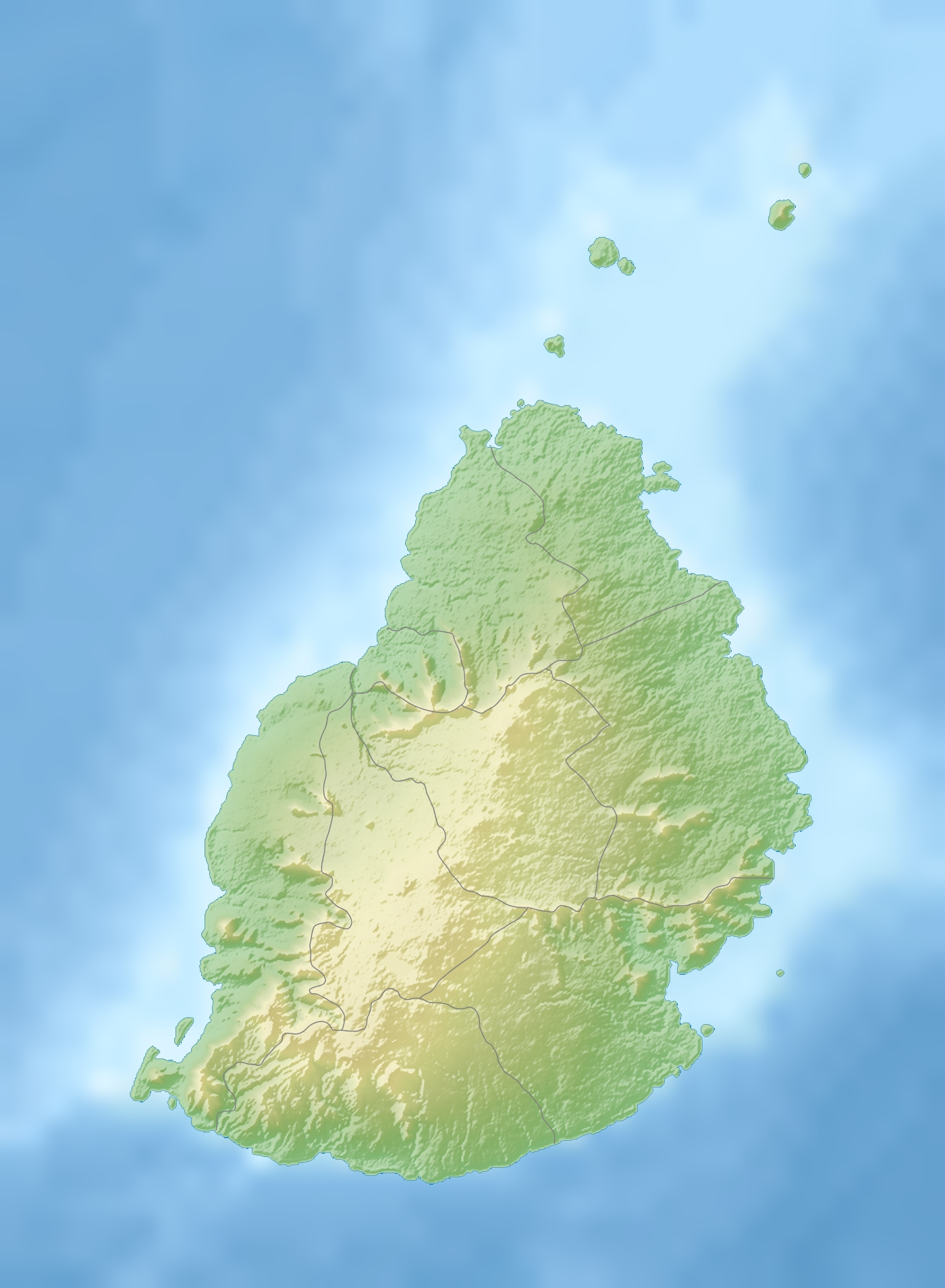
- Location within Mauritius
- Location: Mauritius
- Coordinates: 20.144111°S 57.721624°E
- Area: 4.97 km^{2} (1.92 sq mi)
- Established: 2011

Bras d'Eau National Park is one of only three national parks in Mauritius. It is located in the north-east of the island.

== Flora and fauna ==
After the original Mauritian forests were destroyed, most of the land was used for commercial plantations of alien trees such as West Indian Mahogany, Queensland pine, Tecoma, Eucalyptus robusta and Eucalyptus tereticornis. The majority of the National Park's land still lies beneath these plantations. However patches of the original biodiversity remain.

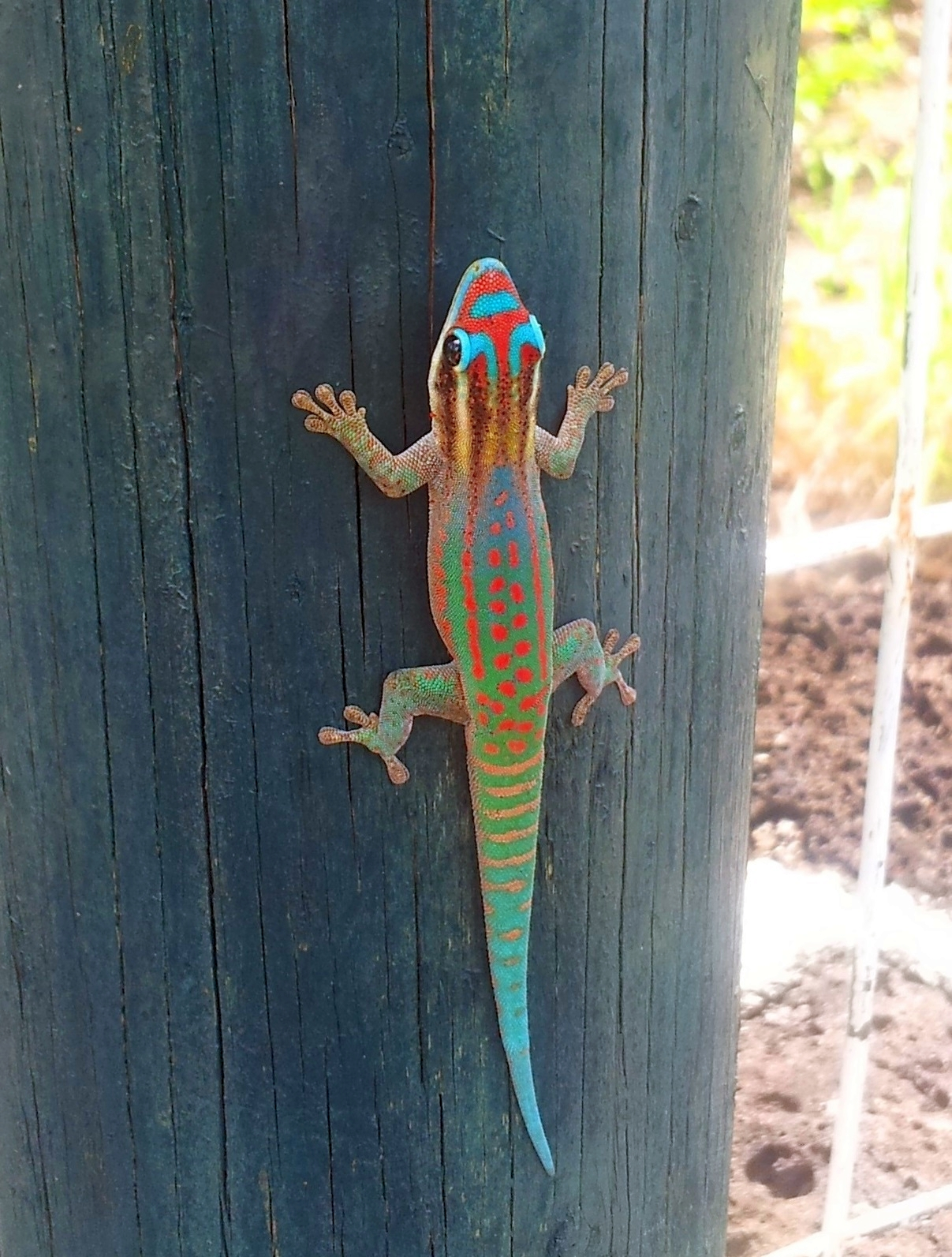
Ornate Day Gecko in Bras d'Eau National Park

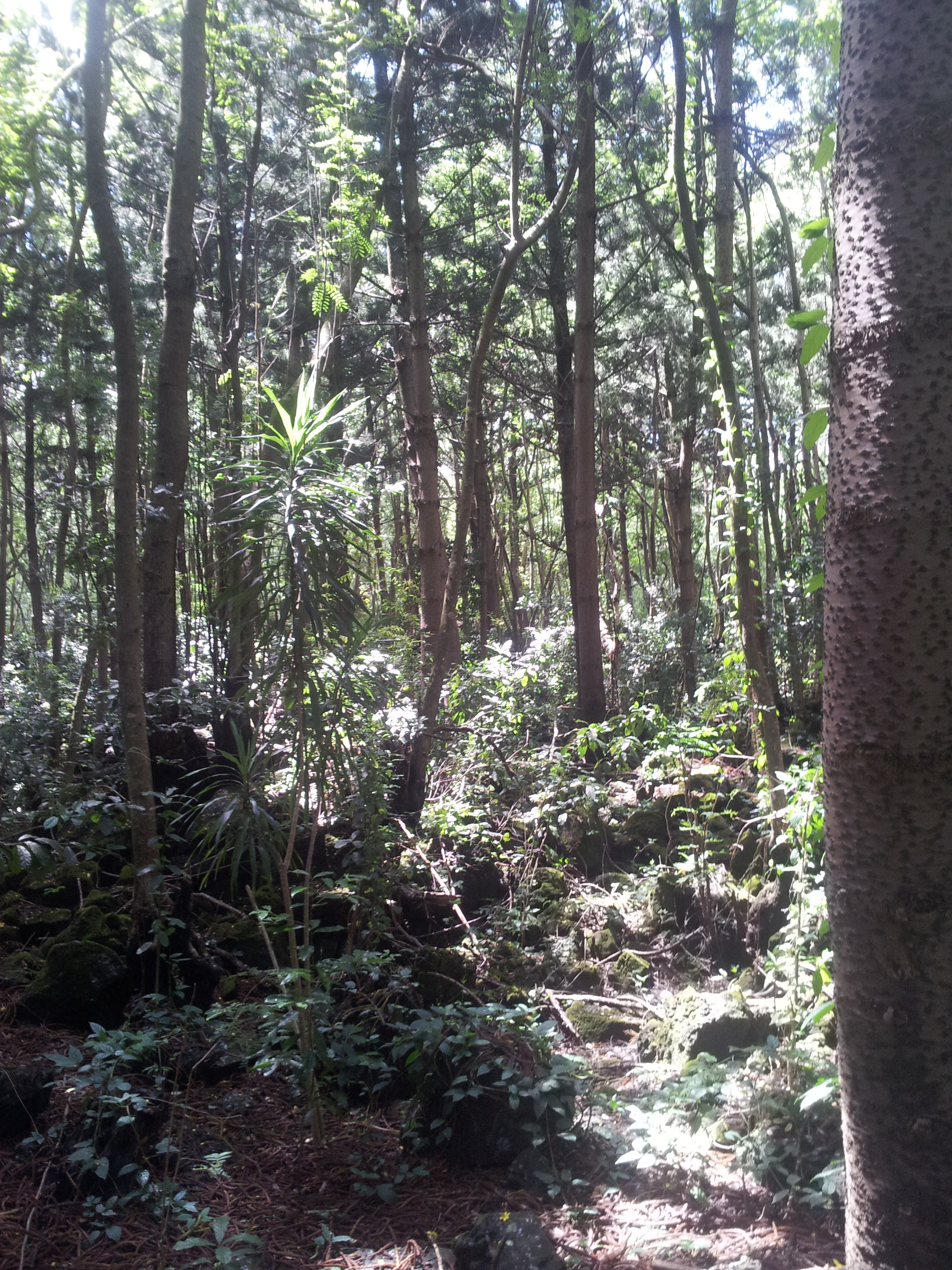
Gradual return of rare endemic Mauritian plants to the forest floor of the commercial Araucaria plantations

Two species of the giant Mauritian ebony trees still survive in small numbers - Diospyros melanida and Diospyros egrettarum. They previously formed part of the original indigenous forests of the area, together with other surviving endemics such as Sideroxylon boutonianum ("Bois de Fer"). Smaller local plants include critically rare ferns, such as Doryopteris pilosa and the aquatic Acrostichum aureum, as well as the orchid Oeoniella.

Of the animal life, most of the larger species are already extinct. However, the park still serves as a preserve for several rare and endemic bird species.

The endemic bird species include the Mascarene paradise flycatcher (Terpsiphone bourbonnensis), the Mauritius cuckooshrike (Lalage typica) and the Mauritius grey white-eye (Zosterops mauritianus).

Geckos in the genus Phelsuma are the only reptiles found here.

== Mares ==
There are 4 mares (little lakes):

The first one is Mare chevrettes, named after the “chevrettes” meaning little shrimp, that are living in the lake.

The second one is Mare mahogany, named after the mahogany forest surrounding it.

The third one is Mare Coq des bois. It is named after the paradise flycatcher.

The largest one is Mare sarcelle, named after the extinct bird “Sarcelle de maurice” also known as the Mascarene teal (Anas theodori). Mare sarcelle is home to two species of mangroves, Bruguiera gymnorhiza and Rhizophora mucronata. Mare sarcelle is also home to 3 migratory birds. They are the Whimbrel (Numenius phaeopus), Striated heron (Butorides striata) and the Common moorhen (Gallinula chloropus).

== Trails ==
There are 2 trails. The first is the Mare sarcelle trail which is the longest being 6.6 km long and usually takes 1 hr 28 m to complete. It starts from the visitor’s centre and ending at Mare sarcelle or either way.

The second trail is the Coq de bois loop which is in the middle of the mare sarcelle trail. In the loop, you might see the Mauritius paradise flycatcher, locally known as “Coq de bois”.

== Proclamation and history ==
The name of the area derives from the arm-like shape of the elegantly winding body of water that stretches inland from the sea ("Bras d'Eau" = "Arm of Water") in between Belcourt Bay and Point Radeau.

Most of the original indigenous Mauritian forests of the area and their wildlife were destroyed early on, and were replaced with commercial timber plantations. Small patches of the original Mauritian biodiversity survived however, and the presence of remnants of critically endangered endemics prompted the establishment of the National Park.

The Park was established on the 25 October 2011, as the second of Mauritius's two land-based national parks (the third national park of the country, Islets, is off the north-east coast). This was done according to Section 11(1) of the 1993 Wildlife and National Parks Act.

Like the other national parks, it is managed by the Mauritian National Parks and Conservation Service. However unlike the more famous Black River Gorges, Bras d'Eau is far quieter and more rarely visited.

== Location ==
The National Park is located in the north east of Mauritius, on the coast near Poste Lafayette. It is approximately 497.2 hectares (1,229 acres) in size, and is composed of parts of Bras d'Eau state land, and some surrounding reserves.

Along with its natural environment, the park is also the site of the Mauritius Radio Telescope. There are also historic 200-year-old ruins in the forest, including the remains of a sugar mill and lime kiln.

There is a picnic site with wooden tables in the forest, and the walking trails are labelled.
