= QpiAI-Indus =

India's first full stack quantum computer

QpiAI-Indus Quantum Computer
- Codename: QpiAI-Indus
- Developer: Dr Nagendra Nagaraja
- Manufacturer: QpiAI
- Product family: Superconducting qubits
- Type: Quantum Computer
- Generation: First
- Released: World Quantum Day (14 April 2025)
- Operating system: 25 qubits quantum computing
- Successor: Kaveri (64 qubits quantum computer) - second generation
- Website: qpiai.tech/products/qpiai-indus-quantum

QpiAI-Indus is a 25-qubit superconducting quantum computer developed by the Bengaluru-based startup company QpiAI. Launched on World Quantum Day in 2025, it is India's first full stack quantum computer. Indus was developed under the leadership QpiAI CEO Nagendra Nagaraja. Its development was assisted and supported by the National Quantum Mission of the Government of India. Its successful development in the silicon city Bangalore is considered a major milestone in the history of quantum computing in India.

== Etymology ==
Indus is the codename of the 25-qubit quantum computer developed by QpiAI. In the company's name, QpiAI, the letter Q stands for quantum, pi stands for the mathematical symbol π and AI means algorithmic intelligence. The term Indus signifies the ancient Indus Valley civilization on the Indian subcontinent.

== Description ==
The QpiAI-Indus quantum computer features a 25-qubit superconducting processor. It is based on transmon qubits and includes a noisy intermediate-scale quantum (NISQ) device. It is integrated with an HPC datacenter, which enables hybrid quantum-classical workflows through tools like QpiAI-Opt and QpiAISaaS.

The success of QpiAI-Indus is deeply tied to the national strategy of India to lead in frontier technologies of the world. It is connected to India's strategic goals in the field of quantum technologies that include the advancement of indigenous technology development, establishment of core infrastructure, and cultivation of a skilled workforce in the field. According to the company, the development of Indus will support deep-tech innovation across various fields of life sciences, drug discovery, materials science, mobility, climate action, and sustainability.

== History ==
The developmental history of Indus can be traced from the foundation of QpiAI in 2019 by Indian quantum physicist and technologist Nagendra Nagaraja. QpiAI was one of eight startup companies selected by the Indian government's National Quantum Mission. Indus is the first generation quantum computer developed by the company. The company also plans to build a 64-qubit computer called Kaveri, followed by the 128-qubit Ganges and the 1,000-qubit Everest.

The project of QpiAI-Indus was financially supported by the state owned lender Small Industries Development Bank of India (SIDBI).
