= Mauritius Radio Telescope =

Radio telescope in Mauritius

- Location(s): Bras d'Eau National Park, Flacq District, Mauritius
- Coordinates: 20°08′21″S 57°43′31″E
- Organization: Indian Institute of Astrophysics; Raman Research Institute; University of Mauritius
- Wavelength: 151.5 MHz (1.979 m)
- Website: www.uom.ac.mu/mrt/
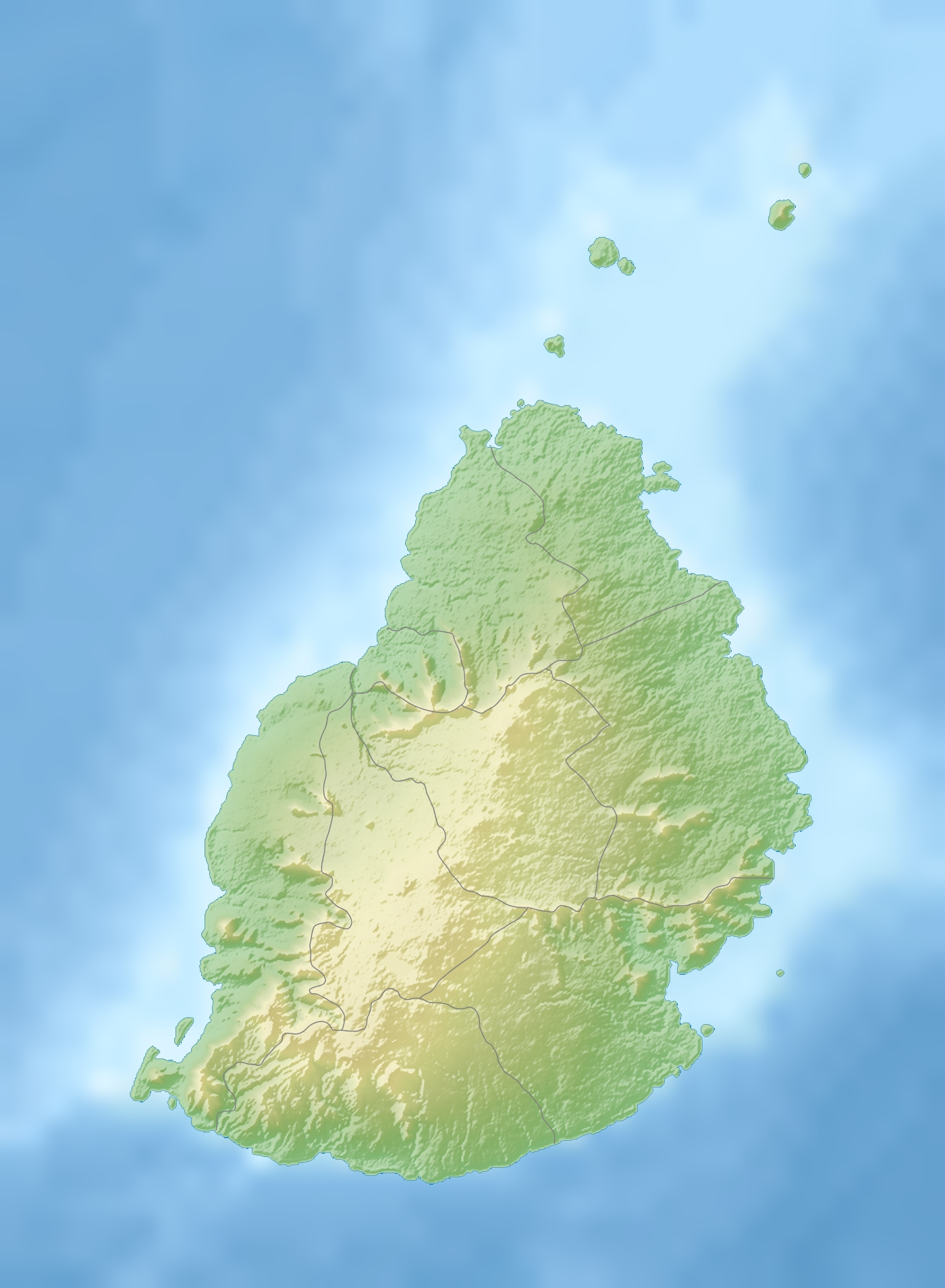
- Location of Mauritius Radio Telescope

The Mauritius Radio Telescope (MRT) is a synthesis radio telescope in Mauritius that is used to make images of the sky at a frequency of 151.5 MHz. The MRT was primarily designed to make a survey with a point source sensitivity of 150 mJy. Its resolution is about 4 arc min.

== Structure ==
The MRT is a T-shaped array consisting of a 2048m-long East-West arm with 1024 fixed helical antennas arranged in 32 groups and an 880m-long North-South arm with 15 movable trolleys, each containing four antennas. There is a single trolley in the North arm. The North-South arm is built along the old Port Louis to Flacq railway line which closed in 1964.

== Function ==
The antennas collect radio waves and transform them into electric signals. The signal from each group is filtered, amplified and sent to the telescope building where it is digitized. The digitized signals are processed in a correlator. Linux systems using custom software transform these correlated signals into raw images called "dirty maps".

The MRT uses aperture synthesis to simulate a 1 km by 1 km filled array. Data is collected as the trolleys in the North-South arm move southward from the array centre. Observations are repeated 62 times until the trolleys reach the southern end the arm. The 1-D data for each day is added so as to make a 2-D map of the sky. Unlike most radio telescopes, the MRT can 'see' very extended sources. Also, the non-co-planarity of the East-West arm have led to new imaging techniques used in cleaning the raw data.

Although the MRT was primarily designed to conduct the 151.5 MHz survey, it has also been used for pulsar observations. During pulsar observations, only the East-West arm is used. The group outputs are added together, with a tracking capability of about 2 degrees for a source transiting at meridian. This corresponds to 8 minutes for an equatorial source. The data is recorded at a fast rate over a band width of 1 MHz. The data processing is done to produce a dedispersed output in the desired format, including the pulsar profile unique to each pulsar.

The MRT is also meant to map the Milky Way. A point source catalogue of around 100,000 objects is to be produced. Already 3 observation rounds of the southern sky have been made. In addition, solar data has also been collected. About 300 GB of raw data has been collected.

=== Scientific objectives ===
The MRT project intends

- to produce radio images of the Southern Celestial Hemisphere and interpret these images;
- to produce a point source astronomical catalog for the Declination range from -70° to -10° (complementing the Sixth Cambridge Survey of radio sources of the northern sky);
- and to study
  - pulsars;
  - the Galactic plane;
  - the solar radio emission;
  - extended extra-galactic radio sources;
  - Supernova remnants;
  - steep spectrum radio sources.

== Project team ==
The MRT, first commissioned in 1992, is run as a joint project by the University of Mauritius, the Indian Institute of Astrophysics (IIA) and the Raman Research Institute. While first initiated by Prof. Ch.V. Sastry of the IIA, the project was run by Prof. N. Uday Shankar of the RRI for nearly 5 years. The Head of MRT in Mauritius rotates between Dr Nalini Issur, Dr Girish Beeharry and Dr Radhakhrishna Somanah.
