= Sarada Vilas College =

Sarada Villas College
- Sarada Vilas Educational Institutions
- Krishnamurthypuram; South India; Mysuru, Karnataka; India

Information
- Motto: Education kindles knowledge.
- Established: 1945; 81 years ago
- Founder: Ramaswamy (founder principal)
- Type: Degree college
- President: B M Subraya
- Enrollment: 1000+
- Campus size: 10 acres
- Website: saradavilas.com

Sarada Vilas College, located in the city of Mysore, Karnataka, India was established in the year 1945 as an Intermediate college. Seven years later, it was upgraded as a Degree college. It now offers eight combinations encompassing physical as well as natural science, all leading to the B.Sc. degree. Students can pursue any one of the following combinations.

1. Physics, chemistry and mathematics (PCM)
2. Physics, electronics and mathematics (PEM)
3. Physics, mathematics and computer science (PMCS)
4. Electronics, mathematics and computer science (EMCS)
5. Chemistry, botany and zoology (CBZ)
6. Biochemistry, microbiology and biotechnology (BMBt)
7. Chemistry, zoology and biotechnology (CZBt)
8. Biochemistry, microbiology and botany (MBB)
9. B.Com
10. BBA
11. M.Sc (General Chemistry)
12. M.Com
13. B.Sc (Hon's) in Data Science and Artificial Intelligence

The college, affiliated to the University of Mysore, is covered under Sec.2(f) and Sec. 12(B) of the UGC Act right from inception. It was accredited by NAAC in 2004 and reaccredited in 2010 with ‘B’ Grade with CGPA of 2.89.

The college expanded its academic activities by launching B.Com. and B.B.M. from 2013 to 2014. It further extended its educational initiative by offering M.Sc. in chemistry from 2014 to 2015. Keeping the present demand, institution started offering a specialized program, B.Sc(Hon's) in Data Science and Artificial Intelligence from 2020 and PG Diploma in E-Commerce and Digitization

The college has an elite faculty with many Doctorates and several M.Phils. Teachers, endowed with knowledge and experience, update themselves by participating in seminars, workshops and refresher courses. The college invites scholars to deliver special lectures to enable the students to expand their horizon.

The college follows government norms and admits students from all sections of the society, irrespective of their social and economic background and status. It is a coeducational college.

== History ==
The saga of Sarada Vilas Educational Institutions began in the year 1861 when His Highness Mummadi Sri Krishnaraja Wodeyar, the then ruler of Mysore state, directed his courtman Rao Bahadur Sri Bhakshi Narasappa to start an Educational Institution in Mysore so as to make the town a Centre for Education.

In keeping with the desire of the king, Sri Narasappa founded a school and named it Sarada Vilas Anglo-Sanskrit School. In the beginning it was housed in a temple and later shifted to Lansdowne building.

In 1899, the king formed a Governing Body to manage the affairs of the school. Sri M. Venkatakrishnaiah, popularly called Tataiah, was named the Secretary. He was mainly instrumental in developing the Institution. In 1904, the school was shifted to the Lansdowne building. The High school section was started in 1917 which was shifted to its own building in 1931.

In 1945, the Institution started an Intermediate College with Sri M.S. Ramaswamy as Founder Principal. In the year 1952, it was upgraded and began to offer the B.Sc. course.

The Institution expanded its activities further by starting law college in 1954, Girls High School in 1961, Teachers College in 1963 and Pharmacy College in 1992.

== Facilities ==
In order to encourage the students to develop their all-round personality, the college lays emphasis on both curricular and co-curricular activities. Keeping this in view, the college offers a wide range of facilities for the benefit of students. These include:

- Digital Library with QR code services
- Career Guidance and Placement Cell
- Multi-Speciality Gymnasium
- Network Resource Centre
- Language lab
- Well Equipped Laboratories
- Wi Fi enabled campus
- Bioinformatics Lab

== Notable alumni ==
- N. R. Narayana Murthy, Founder, INFOSYS
- Dr. V. S. Arunachalam, Former Defence Advisor, Government of India
- Sethumadhava Rao, Joint Secretary (Retired), UGC
- Prof. K. S. Rangappa, Former Vice-Chancellor, University of Mysore
- Dr. H. A. Ranganatha, Director (Retired), NAAC
- Master Hirannaiah, Theatre Personality
- V. Srinivas Prasad, Former Minister, Government of Karnataka
- H. R. Leelavathi, Sugama Sangeetha Artiste
- Go. Madhusudan, Ex MLC, Karnataka
- S. R. Mahesh, Minister, Government of Karnataka
- N. V. Madhusudana, physicist, Shanti Swarup Bhatnagar laureate

Sri. Ambarish, Cine Actor
