= Vinod Krishan =

Indian physicist

- Citizenship: Indian
- Education: Delhi University; University of Tennessee, United States
- Known for: Solid State Physics
- Awards: Dr. Vikram Sarabhai research award for Space Sciences for the year 1992
- Scientific career
- Fields: Astrophysics
- Workplaces: New Delhi

Vinod Krishan (born 14 October 1946), is an Indian physicist, a Senior Professor and dean of sciences at the Indian Institute of Astrophysics, Bangalore. She is involved in teaching and research in Plasma Physics. She is a Fellow of the National Academy of Sciences, India and the 1991 recipient of the Vikram Sarabhai Award for Space Sciences.

== Early life ==
Krishan lived with her grandparents until she was in fourth grade, when she moved to Delhi to live with her parents, Om Prakash and Raj Dulari Pabbi. She traces her first interest in science to trying to replicate an electronic bell from her physics textbook and shorting out the electrical circuits in her home, much to her father's delight.

== Education ==
Vinod Krishan's post-secondary academic career began with earning a BSc Degree (Physics, Chemistry & Maths) in 1966 and M.Sc.(Physics) degree in 1968 from the University of Delhi. She also holds a diploma in German (1968) from the University of Delhi. She did her doctoral degree (Ph.D.) from the University of Tennessee, United States in 1971 and her thesis was on "Damping of plasmons in a nearly free electron gas" in the field of Solid State Physics, and was a Post-doctoral Fellow at the University of Alberta, Edmonton, Alberta, Canada (1971–73).

== Career ==
Vinod Krishan initially worked as Pool Officer at the Centre for Theoretical Studies, Indian Institute of Science, Bangalore from November 1973 to August 1975 and then worked as a University Grants Commission Research Associate. She worked in various capacities as Visiting Scientist (1977–78), a Fellow (1978–81), Reader (1981-1986), Associate Professor (1986-1991), and Professor (1991-1998) at the Indian Institute of Astrophysics, Bangalore, and was a senior Professor at the institute since 1998, teaching Plasma Astrophysics in the Joint Astronomy Programme. She retired from the IIA in 2008. Her research activities encompass the fields of Modeling of Solar Coronal Loops, Solar Granulation, Extragalactic Plasmas, and Structure Formation Through Hydrodynamics.

== Awards ==
Vinod Krishan is recipient of the Dr. Vikram Sarabhai Research Award for Space Sciences for the year 1991. Apart from membership of various scientific institutions connected with her specialization, she is also a Fellow of the National Academy of Sciences India, 1996. For many years she was also an active member of the International Astronomical Union, including hosting the 142nd Symposium in Bangalore, India, 1–5 December 1989.

== Publications and books ==
She has an over one hundred peer-reviewed papers to her credit in the fields of Laboratory Plasmas, Plasma Processes in Extragalactic Sources, Solar Physics, cometary plasmas, Structure Formation Through Hydrodynamics and many miscellaneous subjects.

She edited proceedings of many conferences on solar and plasma physics including the IAU symposium (1989) in addition to being the chief Editor of the Bulletin of the Astronomical Society Of India for several years. She has published three books: 1. Astrophysical Plasmas and Fluids, Kluwer Academic Press, 1998; 2. Plasmas the First State of Matter, Cambridge University Press, 2014 and 3. Physics of Partially ionized Plasmas, Cambridge University Press, 2016.

== Personal life ==
Krishan married Som Krishan in 1968, the same year she completed her master's degree. They completed their doctoral work and grappled with both finding work that would allow them to live in the same place. They have one child.
