= N. V. Madhusudana =

Indian physicist (born 1944)

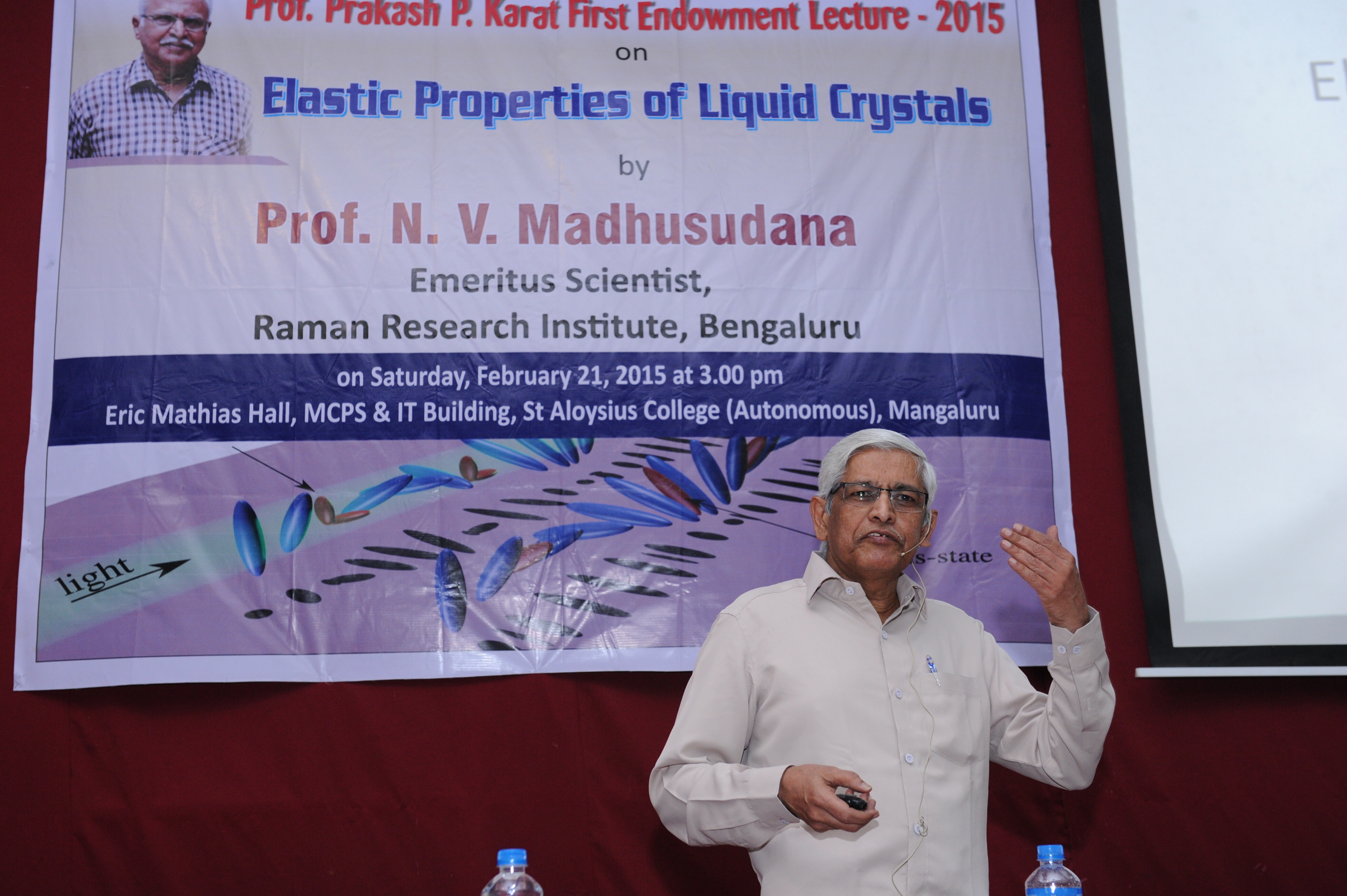
- Born: 9 May 1944 (age 82); Mysore, Karnataka, India
- Education: University of Mysore
- Known for: Studies on liquid crystals
- Awards: 1989 Shanti Swarup Bhatnagar Prize; 2000 MRSI Superconductivity and Materials Science Prize
- Scientific career
- Fields: Physics
- Workplaces: Sarada Vilas College; University of Mysore; Raman Research Institute; University of Paris-Saclay; University of Bordeaux; University of Hyderabad
- Doctoral advisor: Sivaramakrishna Chandrasekhar

Nelamangala Vedavyasachar Madhusudana (born 9 May 1944) is an Indian physicist and an emeritus scientist at Raman Research Institute. Known for his research on liquid crystals, Madhusudhana is an elected fellow of Indian Academy of Sciences and Indian National Science Academy. The Council of Scientific and Industrial Research, the apex agency of the Government of India for scientific research, awarded him the Shanti Swarup Bhatnagar Prize for Science and Technology, one of the highest Indian science awards, for his contributions to physical sciences in 1989.

== Biography ==
University of Mysore

Nelamangala Madhusudana was born on 9 May 1944 at Mysore, in the south Indian state of Karnataka, to N. Vedavyasachar and Indira Bai. After early schooling in Mysore, he earned a graduate degree in science in 1962, which he followed up with a master's degree in physics in 1964, both degrees from the University of Mysore.

He started his career by joining Sarada Vilas College, Mysore, as a demonstrator and became a lecturer in 1965. The same year, he moved to the University of Mysore as a research fellow. While on service, in 1969, he enrolled for his doctoral studies at the university under the guidance of Sivaramakrishna Chandrasekhar and earned a PhD in 1971 for his thesis Structure of nematic liquid crystals.

Subsequently, he joined Raman Research Institute as a scientist and served the institution for two and a half decades. During this period, he became an associate professor in 1977, a professor in 1986, and headed the Liquid Crystals Laboratory of the institute during 1999–2000. After serving as a dean of research from 2001, he superannuated from regular service in 2006, holding the position. Post-retirement, he continued his association with the institute as a senior scientist of the Indian National Science Academy until 2011, and has been serving as an emeritus scientist since that time.

During his service at RRI, he had two sabbaticals abroad – first as a visiting scientist at Laboratoire de physique des solides of the University of Paris-Saclay during 1983–84, and then as a visiting associate professor at Pascal Research Centre of the University of Bordeaux during 1984–85. He also served as a Jawaharlal Nehru chair professor at the School of Physics of the University of Hyderabad on a month-long assignment in December 2009.

Madhusudana is married to Kausalya Rao and the couple has one son, Pramod. The family lives in Bengaluru in Karnataka.

== Legacy ==
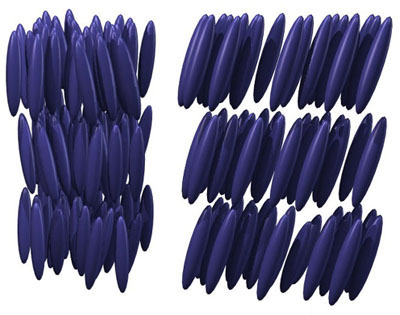
Schematic of alignment in the smectic phases. The smectic A phase (left) has molecules organized into layers. In the smectic C phase (right), the molecules are tilted inside the layers.

Mudhusudana's research has been focusing on the physical studies of liquid crystals. He demonstrated for the first time the electromechanical coupling effects of cholesteric liquid crystals and the suppression induced by curvature in the Smectic-A phase of the crystals. He suggested an explanation for the anti-parallel correlations of near-neighbor molecules and apolar director of highly polar compounds as well as for the nematic to nematic and smectic-A to smectic-A reentrant phase transitions. He elucidated the phenomenon of smectic-A phase with tilted molecules caused by off-axis molecular dipoles and demonstrated the impact of flexoelectricity in nematic phase transitions. He validated the intermediate phases of anti-ferroelectric liquid crystals and the B6-B1-B2 sequence of homologous bent-core molecules by developing models of chiral axial next nearest neighbor xy and a frustrated packing model. He also developed a methodology for measuring twist elastic constant of nematics. These investigations assisted in a wider understanding of antiferroelectric correlations, electro hydrodynamical instabilities and molecular mechanism of liquid crystals. His studies have been documented by way of a number of articles and the online article repository of Indian Academy of Sciences has listed 160 of them. Besides, he has contributed chapters to books published by others and his work has drawn citations from other scientists.

Mudhusudana assisted his mentor, S. Chandrasekhar, in founding the Liquid Crystal Laboratory at Raman Research Institute. His contributions were reported in the development of indigenous know-how for Bharat Electronics Limited for the manufacture of liquid crystal display panels. He is a former associate editor of Pramana, Journal of Physics and is associated with science journals such as Liquid Crystal Communications journal of International Liquid Crystal Society, Indian Journal of Physics of Springer and the Indian Journal of Pure and Applied Physics of the National Institute of Science Communication and Information Resources as a member of their editorial boards. He is also a former editorial board member of "International Journal of Engineering Science" and "Liquid Crystals" journal. He served as the co-director of one of the seminars on soft condensed matter organized by International Centre for Theoretical Physics and chaired a session of the "Indian Statistical Physics Community Meeting" of 2014 where he delivered a keynote address. He also served as a member of the international scientific committee of the first Asian Conference on Liquid Crystals (ACLC2012) held in Yamanashi, Japan in 2012.

== Awards and honors ==
The Indian Academy of Sciences elected Madhusudana as their fellow in 1974. The Council of Scientific and Industrial Research awarded him the Shanti Swarup Bhatnagar Prize, one of the highest Indian science awards in 1989. He received the Superconductivity and Materials Science Prize of the Materials Research Society of India in 2000, the same year as he became a fellow of the Indian National Science Academy. The award orations delivered by him include Savadatti Endowment lecture of Karnataka University Teachers Forum and Annual Lecture of the Bangalore chapter of Royal Chemical Society, both in 1999, Professor Kishore Memorial lecture of Indian Institute of Science in 2003, DAE-Raja Ramanna lecture of Jawaharlal Nehru Centre for Advanced Scientific Research in 2005 and Prof. Prakash P. Karat Endowment lecture of 2012.

== Selected bibliography ==
=== Chapters ===
- Agnes Buka (1993). Modern Topics in Liquid Crystals: From Neutron Scattering to Ferroelectricity. World Scientific. pp. 195–. ISBN 978-981-02-1539-2.
- Asoke Nath Mitra (2009). India in the World of Physics: Then and Now. Pearson Education India. pp. 199–. ISBN 978-81-317-1579-6.

=== Articles ===
- N. V. Madhusudana (2004). "Role of Molecular Dipoles in Liquid Crystals". Molecular Crystals and Liquid Crystals. 409 (1): 371–387. Bibcode:2004MCLC..409..371M. doi:10.1080/15421400490433721. S2CID 95815426.
- A. Roy, N. V. Madhusudana (2005). "A frustrated packing model for the B_{6} -B_{1} -SmAP_{A} sequence of phases in banana shaped molecules". European Physical Journal E. 18 (3): 253–258. Bibcode:2005EPJE...18..253R. doi:10.1140/epje/e2005-00033-x. PMID 16231073. S2CID 30360403.
- V. Manjuladevi, R. Pratibha, N.V. Madhusudana (2002). "Phase transitions in liquid crystals under negative pressures". Physical Review Letters. 88 (5) 055701. Bibcode:2002PhRvL..88e5701M. doi:10.1103/PhysRevLett.88.055701. PMID 11863748.
- S. Dhara, N. V. Madhusudana (2007). "Effect of high electric fields on the nematic to isotropic transition in a material exhibiting large negative dielectric anisotropy". European Physical Journal E. 22 (2): 139–149. Bibcode:2007EPJE...22..139D. doi:10.1140/epje/e2007-00020-3. PMID 17356801. S2CID 34985945.
- A. Roy, N. V. Madhusudana (2008). "Influence of smectic liquid crystals on the Poisson-Boltzmann distribution of ions near charged surfaces". Europhysics Letters. 84 (3) 36006. Bibcode:2008EL.....8436006R. doi:10.1209/0295-5075/84/36006. S2CID 121151573.
- B. Kundu, R. Pratibha, N. V. Madhusudana (2010). "Orientational order in liquid crystals exhibited by some binary mixtures of rod-like and bent-core molecules". European Physical Journal E. 31 (2): 145–152. doi:10.1140/epje/i2010-10556-8. PMID 20195691. S2CID 33775465.

== See also ==
- Geometrical frustration
- Hydrodynamic stability
- Anisotropy
- Poisson–Boltzmann equation
