= Tarun Souradeep =

- Tarun Souradeep in the director's office at the Raman Research Institute
- Born: 1967 (age 58–59)
- Education: Indian Institute of Technology Kanpur (B.Tech); Inter-University Centre for Astronomy and Astrophysics (PhD)
- Known for: Cosmic microwave background; LIGO-India

Tarun Souradeep is an Indian astrophysicist and cosmologist. He is the Director of the Raman Research Institute (RRI) in Bengaluru. His research includes work on the Cosmic Microwave Background (CMB) and participation in efforts to develop gravitational-wave astronomy in India, particularly through the LIGO-India project.

== Early life and education ==
Tarun Souradeep was born in 1967. He earned a B.Tech. degree in mechanical engineering from the Indian Institute of Technology Kanpur (IIT Kanpur) in 1988. After working briefly in automobile design at the Eicher Research Center near Delhi, he shifted his focus to physics. In 1989, he joined the first graduate cohort at the Inter-University Centre for Astronomy and Astrophysics (IUCAA) in Pune. During his doctoral studies, he obtained an M.Sc. in physics from the then University of Pune in 1994 and completed his Ph.D. in gravitation and cosmology at IUCAA, affiliated with the University of Pune.

== Career ==
After completing his doctoral studies, Tarun Souradeep held postdoctoral positions at the Canadian Institute for Theoretical Astrophysics (CITA) at the University of Toronto and Kansas State University. He returned to India in 2000 to join the faculty at IUCAA, where he eventually became a Senior Professor. In 2019, he joined the Indian Institute of Science Education and Research, Pune (IISER Pune) as a professor and served as Chair of the Physics Department until 2022. In January 2022, he took over as Director of the Raman Research Institute (RRI) in Bengaluru.

Tarun coordinated the national site selection and the establishment of the gravitational wave data center at the Inter-University Centre for Astronomy and Astrophysics (IUCAA). He was also a co-author of the 2016 publication reporting the first direct observation of gravitational waves, which was recognized with the Noble Prize awarded to the international research team.

=== Scientific contributions ===
Tarun Souradeep's research encompasses gravitation, quantum cosmology, and observational astrophysics. His work mainly involves the study of the early universe through the cosmic microwave background (CMB) and the advancement of gravitational wave (GW) astronomy.

==== Cosmic Microwave Background research ====
Tarun Souradeep developed the Bipolar Spherical Harmonic (BipoSH) formalism, a method for detecting deviations from statistical isotropy in the Cosmic Microwave Background (CMB). He was part of the Indian team involved in the international core group of the Planck mission.

==== Gravitational Wave astronomy ====
He was a member of the LIGO consortium involved in the first direct detection of gravitational waves. He is a founding member of the Indian Initiative in Gravitational-wave Observations (IndIGO) consortium and has served as its spokesperson. He was one of the lead authors of the proposal for LIGO-India, an advanced LIGO detector planned for India. He also coordinated the site selection of LIGO-India and the proposal to establish a Gravitational Wave Data Centre at the Inter-University Centre for Astronomy and Astrophysics (IUCAA).

==== CMB-Bhārat ====
Tarun is the lead proposer of CMB-Bhārat, also known as Exploring Cosmic History and Origins (ECHO), a proposed next-generation space-based cosmology mission submitted to the Indian Space Research Organization (ISRO). The mission aims to detect B-mode polarization signatures of primordial gravitational waves and involves a multinational collaboration led by an Indian consortium of scientists.

== Awards and recognition ==
- Special Breakthrough Prize in Fundamental Physics (2016): Awarded to the international LIGO Scientific Collaboration for the discovery of gravitational waves.
- Gruber Prize in Cosmology (2016): Awarded to the international LIGO discovery team.
- Elected a fellow of the Indian Academy of Sciences in 2013.
- Elected a fellow of the International Society on General Relativity and Gravitation in 2013.
