= Annapurni Subramaniam =

Indian scientist

- Born: Palakkad (Kerala)
- Education: Indian Institute of Astrophysics
- Children: 2
- Scientific career
- Fields: Astrophysics
- Workplaces: Indian Institute of Astrophysics
- Doctoral advisor: Prof. Ram Sagar

Dr. Annapurni Subramaniam is an astronomer and currently serves as the director of the Indian Institute of Astrophysics, Bangalore. She is also the first woman astronomer to head the institute. She works on areas like star clusters, stellar evolution and population in galaxies and Magellanic clouds.

== Education and early life ==
Subramaniam finished her schooling from Victoria College, Palakkad, in science. She did her PhD on the topic "Studies of star clusters and stellar evolution" from Indian Institute of Astrophysics in 1996. Subramaniam also plays the violin, sometimes as an accompanying artist to her father, Carnatic musician Palakkad K.S. Narayanaswamy.

== Career ==
Subramaniam was a research fellow at the Indian Institute of Astrophysics from 1990 to 1996. She then became a postdoctoral fellow in 1998 at the institute and currently works as a professor and director of institute. She had also previously worked as Scientist-C at the IIA. She is an active member of the International Astronomical Union. She leads a research group that explores various stellar populations to study the structure, evolution and chemical enrichment of Magellanic Clouds. Subramaniam was also heavily involved with AstroSat, the first multi-wavelength space telescope mission from the Indian Space Research Organisation, where she served as the calibration scientist for the UV imaging telescope.

== Field of research ==
Subramaniam's major field of research includes:

- Star clusters (open and globular)
- Star formation and pre-MS stars
- Classical Be & Herbig Ae/Be stars
- Galactic structure
- Magellanic Clouds
- Stellar population

Her list of publications can be found on the Astronomy Database.

== Current projects ==
At Indian Institute of Astrophysics, her current projects include:

- Emission line stars in star clusters
- Star formation history of young star clusters
- Candidate old open clusters - unraveling the old disk
- Accurate photometry of unstudied open clusters
- Halo of the Small Magellanic Cloud
- Stellar population in the Large Magellanic Cloud
- Outer limits Survey: Magellanic Clouds

== Awards ==
- Vigyan Shri Award under Rashtriya Vigyan Puraskar scheme (2024)
- Asian Scientist 100 (2025)
- COSPAR vikram Sarabhai medal (2026)
