= Raman Research Institute =

Scientific research institute in Bengaluru, India

- Type: Research Institution
- Established: 1948; 78 years ago
- Affiliations: Jawaharlal Nehru University
- Director: Tarun Souradeep
- Students: 90
- Location: Bengaluru, Karnataka, India; 13°0′46.51″N 77°34′51.78″E
- Campus: Urban
- Website: www.rri.res.in

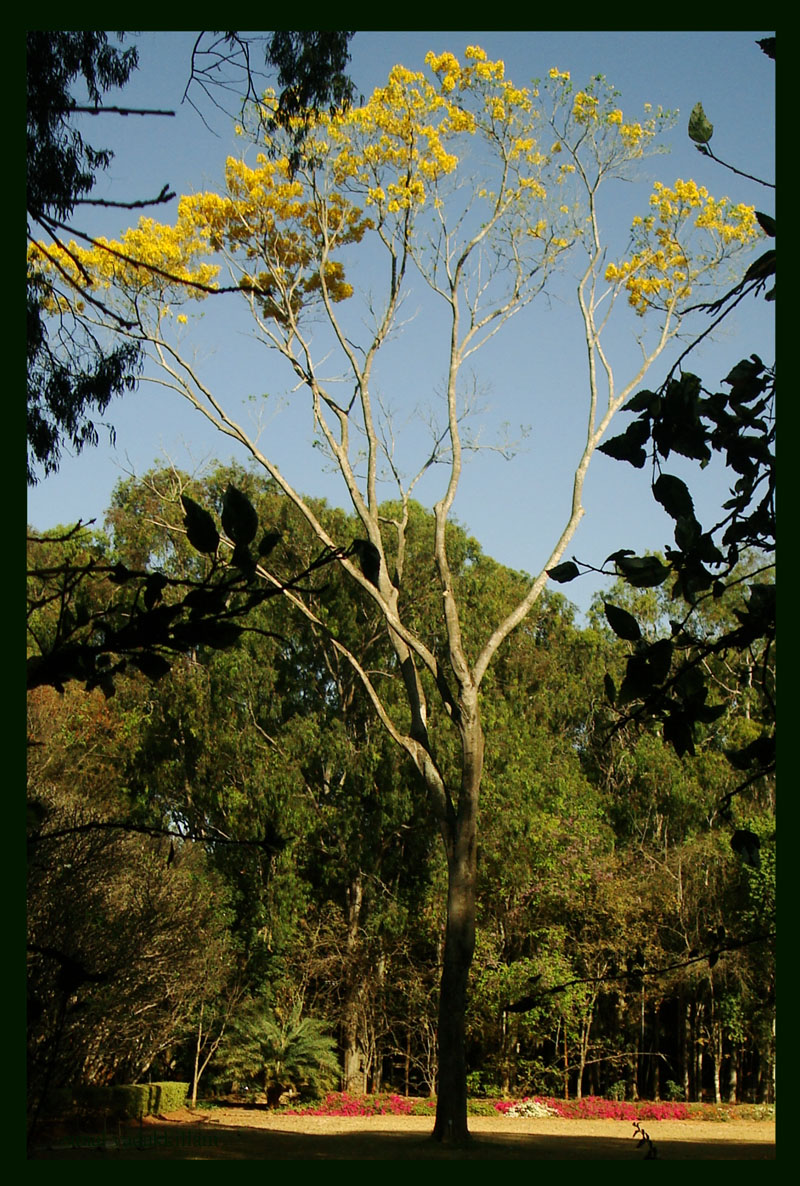
Raman Tree

The Raman Research Institute (RRI) is an institute for scientific research located in Bengaluru, India. It was founded by Nobel laureate Sir C. V. Raman in 1948. Although it began as an institute privately owned by C. V. Raman, it became an autonomous institute in 1972, receiving funds from the Department of Science and Technology of the Government of India.

== History ==
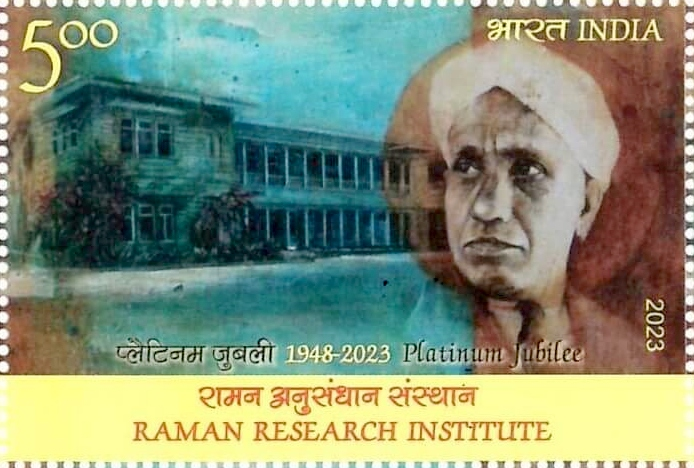
2023 Indian stamp, featuring C. V. Raman and dedicated to the 75th anniversary of the institute

Before Raman considered founding a research institute, he had approached the former Maharaja of Mysore seeking land to build office and conference premises for the Indian Academy of Sciences (IAS). The Maharaja acceded to Raman's request and a 10-acre (40,000 m^{2}) plot of land in the Malleshwaram suburb of Bengaluru was allotted to the Indian Academy of Sciences in 1934. However, the academy (then headed by Raman) made no use of the land for seven years. According to the terms of the deal with the Maharaja, the land could be to another use by the government of Mysore if it still remained unused at the end of 1941.

Raman, as President of the IAS, held an extraordinary meeting of the academy in 1941, and proposed that a research institute (to be named after himself) be built on the land. The proposal was approved and a foundational stone was laid on the ground, signifying that the land was now in use. However, it was not until 1948 that the institute was opened. Raman had planned the institute much before he retired as the head of the Physics Department of the Indian Institute of Science. His idea had been to move directly to his newly founded institute when he retired from IISc. This happened in 1948 - Thus, the Raman Research Institute began under the umbrella of the Indian Academy of Sciences, and both under Raman's leadership.

Raman had an apparent hatred for writing project reports or having to give periodic status reports to project funders. For this reason, Raman refused to accept any funds from the Indian government and other sources. "He was of the firm belief that science could not be done that way,” said Prof. N. V Madhusudana, Dean of Research at the RRI and a liquid crystal scientist. As a Nobel Laureate, Raman enjoyed significant respect in Indian public life and was able to raise funds for the institute through private donations and fund-raisers without state involvement. Unashamed of his fundraising, Raman declared: "Our greatest men were beggars—the Buddha, Sankara and Mahatma Gandhi." Raman also found the scrutiny the Government was taking in funding scientific research in the 1950s and 1960s insufficient.

"Till Raman's death, this was his private research institute. He had a very small group of research students working with him and very few administrative staff”, said Prof. Madhusudana.

Raman was clear that after his death, the Presidency of the IAS and Director of the RRI could pass to different individuals. Equally the Raman Research Institute should not remain subordinate to the Indian Academy of Sciences but enjoy autonomy and a distinct statutory identity of its own. Just before his death, Raman established a framework for the running of the institute, separating it completely from the Indian Academy of Sciences and giving it statutory autonomy. The Institute adopted the change immediately after Raman's death in 1971 with the consent of the government, and stepped into a new era as a statutory body, functioning since 1972 on annual grants received from the Department of Science and Technology (DST), Government of India.

Tarun Souradeep has been the director of the institute since January 2022.

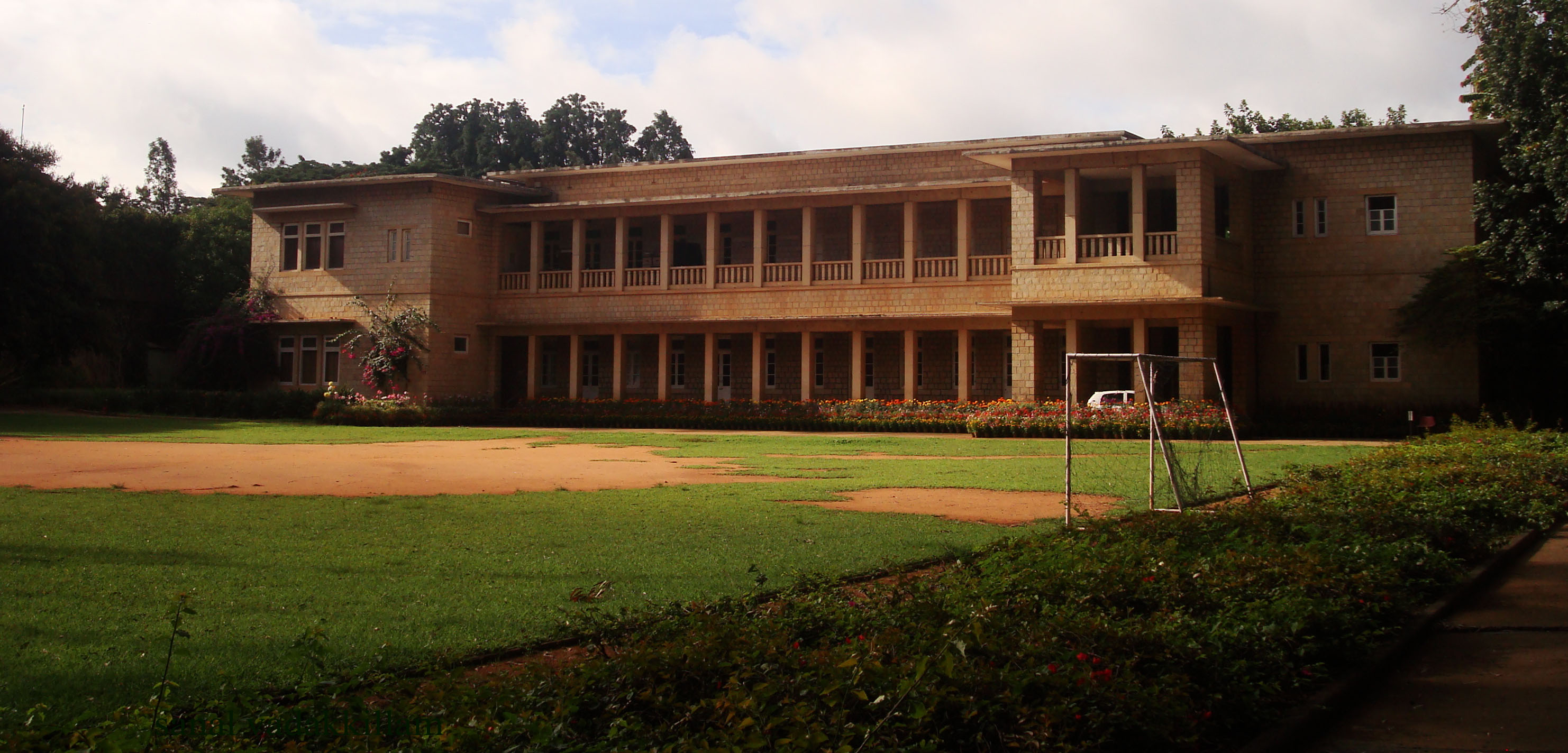
Raman Research Institute

== Achievements ==
Despite budgetary and infrastructural constraints, scientists working under Raman carried out some ground-breaking work. For instance, S. Pancharatnam, who joined the institute in 1954, discovered a fundamental quantum optic effect. This work, according to Jayaraman, was "the most outstanding original piece of research that came out of RRI at that time."

This discovery proved for the first time that geometric phase exists in optics. But this work was not known to the world until similar discovery was made by scientists elsewhere about two decades later. Subsequently, RRI could convincingly prove that Pancharatnam discovered this long ago and today "this phase is called Pancharatnam Phase world over," said Madhusudana. Pancharatnam unfortunately did not live long enough to see this and his career was cut short when he died in 1969 while in Oxford.

=== Collections ===
The institute also houses Raman's prized collection of gems, crystals, minerals, and rock specimens from all over the world. Raman, who was fascinated by the colours of the biological kingdom, also had a wide collection of stuffed birds, beetles, and butterflies in the museum. Raman is reputed to have taken much pride in showing his precious collections to visitors to the institute. During Raman's time, many celebrated scientists from other countries paid a visit to the institute. Among them were: J. D. Bernal, E. C. Bullard, Patrick Blackett, Charles Galton Darwin, Paul Dirac, G. Gamow, J. B. S. Haldane, Linus Pauling, C. F. Powell, L. Rosenfeld, G. Wentzel and Norbert Wiener.

== Research areas ==
The main areas of research are:

- Astronomy and Astrophysics
- Theoretical Physics
- Light and Matter Physics
- Soft Condensed Matter Physics

=== Soft condensed matter ===
==== Liquid crystals ====
One of the current research priority areas of the institute is liquid crystals. This has been an active area of research at the Raman Research Institute for nearly three decades. The research programme covers a broad spectrum of activities ranging from the synthesis of new liquid crystalline materials to display electronics. Discoveries of the columnar phase formed by disc-like molecules and pressure induced mesomorphism are two of the early significant contributions made by the liquid crystal group. "Out of 36 liquid crystal materials discovered in the world, three were from this institute," Prof. Madhusudana has stated. Among them were two new liquid crystalline phases, namely the undulating twist grain boundary C phase and the biaxial smectic A phase.

Techniques developed for driving passive matrix liquid crystal displays at the institute are now being widely used. In recent years the liquid crystal group has been working on electrochemical aspects of surface science and on other soft materials like surfactants, polymers, and on the physics of biological systems.

=== Astronomy and Astrophysics ===
Astronomy and astrophysics have been another strong area of research for the RRI. According to Prof. Madhusudana, this department has the highest number of faculty and research students of the institute. In the first two decades of the twenty-first century, it has been carrying out observational programmes in radio astronomy, covering almost the entire radio spectrum. Besides having a millimetrewave telescope of 10.4 metre diameter on the campus, the RRI has set up the Gauribidanur Radio Observatory, a decametrewave Radio telescope at Gauribidanur, about 80 kilometres from Bengaluru. This has been done jointly with the Indian Institute of Astrophysics (IIA), Bengaluru. This is one of the few largest telescopes that operate at the wavelength of 10 metre and is being used by RRI scientists to study radio emission from various types of celestial objects such as the sun, Jupiter and similar radio sources in Milky Way and other galaxies.

Other radio telescopes being used by RRI scientists are the Ooty Radio Telescope, at Ooty, and Giant Metrewave Radio Telescope (GMRT), near Pune, both set up by the Tata Institute of Fundamental Research (TIFR). RRI also played an active role in building the Mauritius Radio Telescope, a low-frequency radio telescope in Mauritius jointly with the University of Mauritius and IIA.

The major astronomical investigations pursued at the Institute can be broadly classified into the following categories: (i) Neutron Stars and Pulsars; (ii) cosmology; (iii) Diffuse matter in space; and (iv) Radio Sky Surveys.

=== Theoretical physics ===
Activity in theoretical physics at the institute has focused on relativity and gravity, quantum theory, and optics. The current activity in gravitation concentrates on two themes, gravitational radiation and quantum gravity. Gravitation is known to be the weakest of all known forces of nature, but it dominates all structure and motion on the astronomical scale because of its attractive universality, its long range and the fact that matter on the large scale is essentially neutral. The correct theory of gravitation is now believed to be Einstein's General Theory of Relativity. One of the fundamental predictions of General Theory of Relativity is that of gravitational waves — waves of distortion of spacetime itself - propagating at a finite speed of light. This replaces the Newtonian gravitations forces which was instantaneous. Such waves are expected to be emitted when, for example, two massive inspiralling stars tend to coalesce under their mutual gravitations attraction. Accurate calculation of this gravitational radiation — its waveform — has been one of the major research areas of the theoretical physics group at the institute. Their work is expected to be a crucial input towards its eventual detection.

Another major activity of the theoretical physics group has been in studying the propagation of light waves in certain types of liquid crystals and minerals and their associated polarization phenomenon. The RRI has been a pioneer in this field of study, initiated by one of Raman's research students, Pancharatnam.

==== Quantum Information and Computing (QuIC) laboratory ====
During June 2020, QuIC was successful in developing the toolkit and ran a simulation that helps in safe quantum key distribution between devices. In February 2021, a team of researchers under the guidance of Prof. Urbasi Sinha in collaboration with Prof. Barry Sanders from the University of Calgary demonstrated the distribution of quantum key using free space between two buildings at a distance of 50 meters that used quantum entanglement based quantum-key distribution technique. It is part of the Quantum Experiments using Satellite Technology (QuEST) project supported by Indian Space Research Organization (ISRO). This work is part of the National Mission on Quantum Technologies and Applications. One of the objectives is to develop secure encrypted communication that are harder to break even with ongoing advances in computing technology. Prof. Urbasi Sinha and her team at RRI have been working on Quantum cryptography since 2017.

== Research facilities ==
To support its wide-ranging research activities in astronomy, physics, and materials science, RRI maintains several specialized research facilities that provide both technical and infrastructural support to its scientific programs.

=== Electronics Engineering Group (EEG) ===
The Electronics Engineering Group of RRI is particularly involved in the design, development, and construction of sophisticated instrumentation for experimental astronomy and physics. In close collaboration with the Astronomy & Astrophysics group and other research groups, EEG is dedicated to three principal lines of activity: millimeter-wave and RF system development, digital circuit design and signal processing, and X-ray astronomy instrumentation. In the first domain, the team creates high-performance feeds, receivers, broad-band antennas, and low-noise amplifiers, and test facilities cover wavelengths from decameters up to millimeters. The digital electronics team constructs general-purpose digital receivers, spectrometers, correlators, and FPGA-based signal processing systems, many of which are used overseas. Recently, EEG has diversified into X-ray astronomy instrumentation, working on the development of detectors, proportional counters, and X-ray polarization measurement systems with the backing of clean room facilities and special testing tools. EEG also participates actively in national and international scientific institutions.

=== Library ===
RRI's library, originally founded by Sir C. V. Raman, has grown alongside the institute's research activities. Its collections are particularly strong in astronomy, astrophysics, theoretical physics, optics, and liquid crystals, while also covering computer science, electronics, scientific biographies, and general science. In addition to books, the library holds CDs, DVDs, and full-text access to over 4,000 online journals through the National Knowledge Resource Consortium. Services encompass circulation, interlibrary loans, reprography, literature search support, and daily reports on scientific advancements. The library is also computerized with KOHA software, allowing OPAC facility for internal and external users, and keeps the institute's academic output digitally through DSpace. It is extensively utilized by RRI researchers as well as researchers in other prominent institutes across India.

=== Mechanical Engineering Services (MES) ===
MES gives accurate mechanical support to the institute's research laboratories, such as the Radio Astronomy Lab, Light and Matter Physics Group, Soft Condensed Matter Group, and X-ray Lab. Its Engineering Workshop also produces intricate mechanical components for instruments like millimeter-wave and radio telescope antennas, X-ray polarimeters, and custom mounts for laboratory experiments. Some of the key works include the fabrication of the 10.4-m millimeter-wave telescope, the 12-m preloaded parabolic antenna, and Mauritius Radio Telescope and GMRT antenna systems. The Sheet Metal Fabrication Workshop is responsible for enclosures, system racks, and structural parts for electronic instrumentation such as multi-band feeds and experimental setup. MES integrates sophisticated machinery, clean environments, and experienced personnel to provide high-precision, tailor-made mechanical solutions that enable both astronomy and physics research at RRI.
