= Prajval Shastri =

Indian astrophysicist

- Born: Mangalore
- Education: St. Agnes College, Mangaluru, Indian Institute of Technology Bombay, Tata Institute of Fundamental Research
- Known for: Extragalactic Astronomy and Active Galactic Nuclei
- Scientific career
- Fields: Astrophysics
- Workplaces: Indian Institute of Astrophysics
- Doctoral advisor: Vijay Kumar Kapahi

Prajval Shastri is an astrophysicist, formerly at the Indian Institute of Astrophysics, Bangalore and specializes in the area of phenomenology of active galaxies driven by supermassive black holes using multi-wavelength observations ranging from radio to X-ray wavelengths.

== Early life and education ==
Shastri grew up in Mangalore and after her schooling she completed her BSc in Physical Sciences from St. Agnes College Mangalore (University of Mysore). She then went on to pursue MSc in physics from Indian Institute of Technology Bombay. She completed her PhD from Tata Institute of Fundamental Research, India on the topic "Relativistic Beaming in Active Galactic Nuclei" in the year 1989 under the supervision of Vijay Kumar Kapahi.

== Current Research ==
Shastri's current research specialization is the phenomenon of Active Galactic Nuclei. Her present research areas are:

- AGN Emission-line Regions (Integrated Field Spectroscopic Imaging, WiFeS at Siding Spring)
- X-ray Emission from AGN (XMM-Newton, Suzaku)
- Jets in Radio-Quiet AGN (very-long-baseline interferometry, GMRT)
- Hot Gaseous outflows in AGN (Far-Ultraviolet Spectroscopic Explorer)
- Blazar Variability: WEBT monitoring campaigns (Vainu Bappu & Hanle Telescopes)

== Professional memberships ==
Shastri holds memberships of the following organizations:

- International Astronomical Union
- Organising Committee, Commission on Astrostatistics & Astroinformatics, International Astronomical Union
- Organising Committee, Commission 40 (Radio Astronomy), International Astronomical Union
- Astronomical Society of India
- Indian Physics Association
- American Physical Society

== List of Publications ==
Shastri's complete list of publications can be found here. Some of her papers are:

- Probing the physics of Seyfert galaxies using their emission-line regions (2015, AIPC 1967, 110002)
- OVI Asymmetry and an Accelerated Outflow in an Obscured Seyfert: FUSE and HST STIS Spectroscopy of Markarian 533 (2006, Astrophys. J. 646, 76; astro-ph/0603842)
- When Less Is More: Are Radio Galaxies below the Fanaroff-Riley Break More Polarized on Parsec Scales? (2005, Astrophys. J. Lett, 632, L69; astro-ph/0509559)
- Jets in Seyfert galaxies (2003, in Active Galactic Nuclei: from Central Engine to Host Galaxy, eds.: Collin, Combes & Shlosman)
- Seyferts & their Radio Morphology (2001, Astron. Astrophys. Trans., 20, 281)
- Quasar X-ray Spectra Revisited (1993, Astrophys. J., 410, 29)
- A Relativistically Beamed X-ray Component in Quasars? (1991, Mon. Not. R. astr. Soc. 249, 640)

== In the news ==
- The Hindu -- Loving each dot and smudge in the sky
- The Hindustan Times --Einstein has been proven right again
- The Hindustan Times --Make physics more gender inclusive
- The Hindustan Times --The (un)scientific temper of India
- The Weather Channel --Ask an Astronomer: Professor Prajval Shastri on First-Ever Image of Black Hole, Recent Breakthroughs, and More
- The Hindustan Times --Will physics un-gender itself in the new decade?
- The Indian Express -- Women's Day: Why astrophysicist Prajval Shastri believes that gender discrimination must not be perpetuated at institutions by teachers
- The Indian Express --Equality is Everyones Work
- The Conversation -- We must include more women in physics
