= QNu Labs =

Indian cybersecurity company

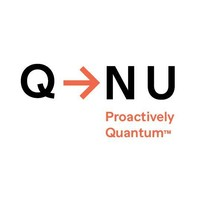
- Type: Private
- Industry: Computer security, Technology, Cybersecurity
- Founded: 2016
- Founder: Sunil Gupta, Srinivasa Rao Aluri, Mark Mathias, Pravin Kini, Anil Prabhakar
- Headquarters: Bengaluru, India
- Area served: Worldwide
- Products: Armos; Tropos; Qosmos; Hodos
- Website: https://www.qnulabs.com/

QNu Labs (or QuNu Labs Private Limited) is a cybersecurity company headquartered in Bengaluru, India. It is credited to be the first firm in India to successfully develop commercial cybersecurity products using quantum physics. It has a subsidiary called QNu Labs Inc, which was set up in Massachusetts, US in 2019.

The company was founded in 2016 by Sunil Gupta, Srinivasa Rao Aluri, Mark Mathias, Pravin Kini, and Anil Prabhakar. It was incubated at Indian Institute of Technology-Madras and later began operations in Bengaluru.

After conducting field trials for its quantum key distribution product, QNu Labs received support from Cisco Launchpad in 2018. Subsequently, it launched two products—a quantum key distributor called Armos and a quantum random number generator called Tropos—for national and international markets in 2020. In April of 2026, the Indian government announced QNu Labs, under the National Quantum Mission, developed 1000-km quantum communication network.
