= Nagendra Nagaraja =

Indian quantum physicist and technologist

- Born: Nagendra Nagaraja
- Citizenship: India
- Education: Coventry University, UK; Illinois Institute of Technology, Chicago, USA; Bangalore University; Indian Institute of Management Bangalore
- Known for: QpiAI-Indus quantum computer
- Scientific career
- Fields: Quantum computing, AI, and algorithmic intelligence

Nagendra Nagaraja is an Indian quantum physicist and technologist. He is the founder and CEO of the Indian startup company QpiAI specialised in the field of quantum computer. He is known for the construction of the QpiAI-Indus quantum computer in India. His main interests are in the field of quantum computing, artificial and algorithmic intelligence, etc. He is also an author of several papers and books in these fields. He holds Ph.D. degree in Wireless, ML, and AI from Coventry University, United Kingdom.

The inspiration for success of the technologist Nagendra Nagaraja lies in the philosophy of the ancient Indian strategist Acharya Chanakya. In an interview with media, he said that his ideal person is Chanakya. He is inspired by the philosophy of focusing on achieving goals as earlier practiced by the Indian philosopher Acharya Chanakya.

== Education and career ==
In the year 2000, Nagendra Nagaraja completed his Bachelor's degree from Bangalore University in Electronics and communications engineering. In 2008, he completed Master degree in ECE (Network Engineering) from Illinois Institute of Technology in Chicago, USA. He also went to study management program focused on entrepreneurship at Indian Institute of Management, Bangalore. Later he worked in the leading companies like NVIDIA and Qualcomm, Lucent Microelectronics. There he joined engineering teams of the companies.

== As an entrepreneur ==
After having long technological experiences from the deep tech companies like NVIDIA and Qualcomm, he founded several companies and established his self as an entrepreneur. In 2016, he, along with Vinod Dham and Prashant Trivedi, founded a startup company AlphaICs in Bangalore. In the year 2018, he aimed to be first AI Unicorn from India. In 2019, he founded his startup company QpiAI, which is specialised in integrating artificial intelligence (AI) with quantum computing for various enterprise applications. The startup company is providing real-world quantum solutions to the critical sectors of materials science and drug discovery to several global enterprises. On 8 April in the year 2021, he founded his major company Qpi Technology. In the same year, he founded subsidiary company Qpivolta to manufacture solid state batteries and Quantum batteries in future.

"At QpiAI, we envision a future where quantum-inspired computing and artificial intelligence converge to solve humanity's most complex challenges - from accelerating drug discovery to optimizing global supply chains. We are pioneering next-generation transformation by making quantum computing's power accessible today, not decades from now, delivering measurable impact across industries. By standing at the frontier of Quantum and AI, QpiAI is not just predicting the future of enterprise technology, we are actively building it.”

— Nagendra Nagaraja, Unleashing Quantum Intelligence to Accelerate Real-World Innovation, Microsoft

== Scientific career ==
Nagendra Nagaraja has filed 30 patents in the fields of wireless, security, multimedia and artificial intelligence. Among these 30 filed patents, 27 patents were granted. His major patents are related to the invention of quantum technologies. The patents are granted by the United States Patent and Trademark Office (USPTO).

He is one of the prominent technocrats in the field of quantum computing in India. In 2025, he raised funds of $32 millions with help of National Quantum Mission of India and Avataar Ventures for the development of the quantum computer QpiAI-Indus at his flagship startup company QpiAI in Bangalore. It is expected that this fresh funds $32 million will support the company’s operations for the next 3 to 3.5 years for the construction of the next generation quantum computer of 64 qubits by the end of the next year.
