= Indian Institute of Astrophysics =

Research institute in Bangalore, India

Coordinates: 14°16′47″N 77°10′48″E

- Type: Research institution
- Established: 1971; 55 years ago
- Director: Annapurni Subramaniam
- Location: Bengaluru, Karnataka, India
- Campus: Urban
- Website: www.iiap.res.in

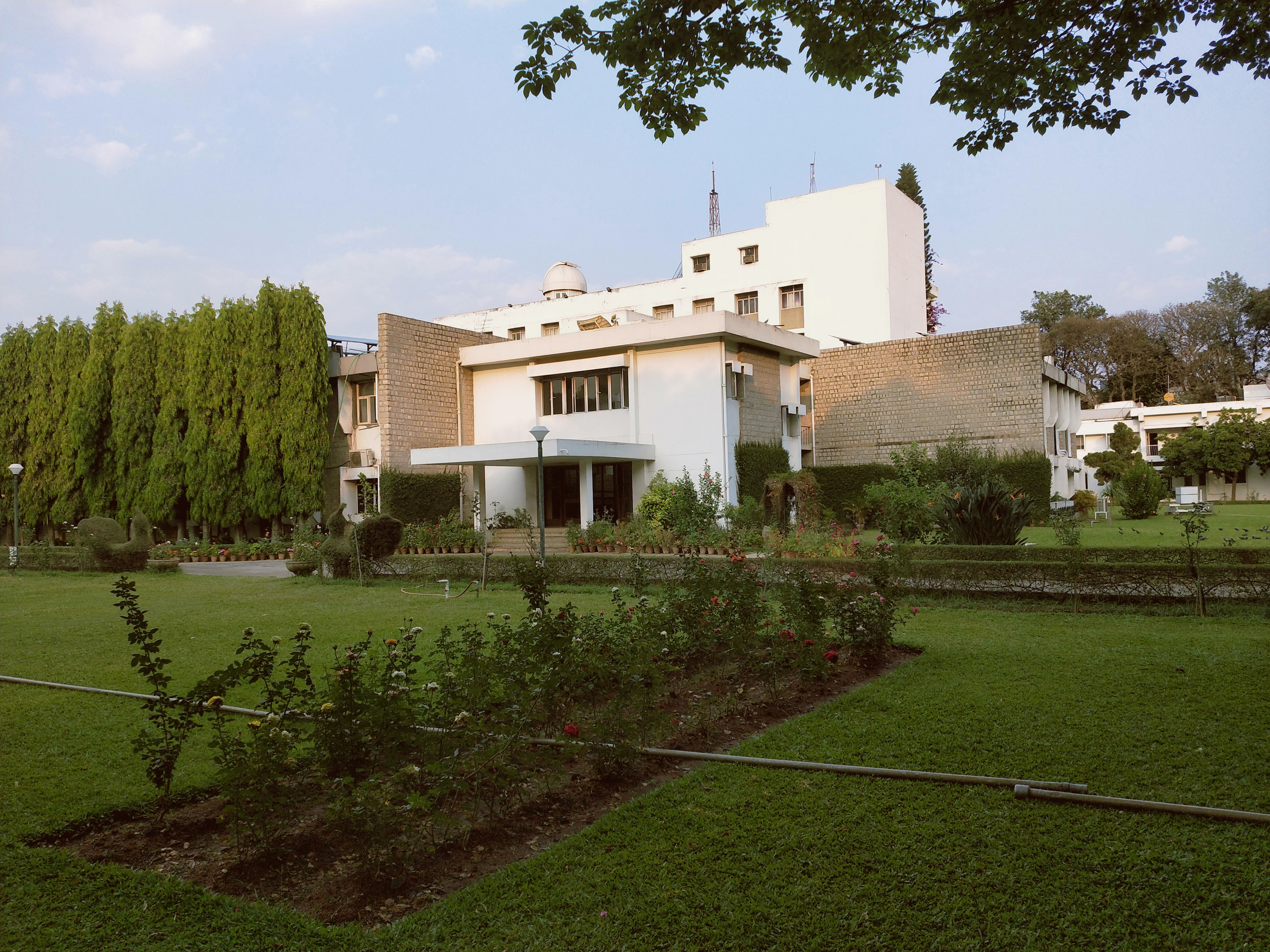
Indian Institute of Astrophysics, Bangalore main campus

The Indian Institute of Astrophysics (IIA), with its headquarters in Bengaluru, is an autonomous research institute wholly funded by the Department of Science and Technology, Government of India. IIA conducts research primarily in the areas of astronomy, astrophysics and related fields.

The institute has a network of laboratories and observatories in India, including Kodaikanal (the Kodaikanal Solar Observatory), Kavalur (the Vainu Bappu Observatory), Gauribidanur (the Gauribidanur Radio Observatory), Hanle (the Indian Astronomical Observatory) and Hosakote.

IIA contributed to Astrosat, India's first dedicated multi-wavelength space observatory. The Astrosat project is a collaborative effort of many different research institutions from India. The institute led the development of Ultra-Violet Imaging Telescope (UVIT).

== Areas of research ==
Researchers at IIA work on a diverse set of topics related to Astronomy and Astrophysics. However, the research can be broadly classified under the following areas:

- Sun & Solar System
- Stellar Astronomy, Galactic Astronomy & Extragalactic Astronomy
- Cosmology & Theoretical Astrophysics
- Astronomical Instrumentation
- Space Astronomy

== History ==
William Petrie (died: 1816), an officer of the East India Company set up private observatory in his residence located in Egmore, Chennai (formerly Madras), India. The main aim of the observatory, according to Petrie, was

"to provide navigational assistance to the company ships and help determine the longitudes by observing the eclipses of Moon and satellites of Jupiter".

In 1790, this private observatory was taken over by the East India Company, with Michael Topping (1747–96) as an astronomer. In 1792, the observatory was expanded and shifted to a complex in Nungambakkam area of Chennai. This was the first modern observatory outside Europe.

As early as 1881, Mr. Blanford, then Meteorological Reporter to the government of India, recommended "the improvement of the work of solar observations in order to obtain accurate measures of the sun’s heating power at the earth’s surface and its periodic variations". In May 1882, the government astronomer at Madras, Norman Robert Pogson, proposed the need for photography and spectrography of the sun and the stars using a twenty-inch telescope, which could be at a hill station in South India.

On 20 July 1893 following a famine in Madras Presidency, which underscored the need for a study of the sun to better understand monsoon patterns, a meeting of the U.K. Secretary of State, Indian Observatories Committee, chaired by Lord Kelvin, decided to establish a solar physics observatory at Kodaikanal, based on its southern, dust free, high altitude location. Michie Smith was selected to be superintendent. Starting in 1895 there was a rapid transfer of work and equipment from the Madras Observatory to Kodaikanal and the observatory was founded on 1 April 1899. Later this Kodaikanal solar observatory become the foundation of modern Indian institute of Astrophysics.

In 1968 a new field observatory was started at Kavalur for stellar spectroscopy and photometry. Expansion of activities and interests have led to the formation of the new optics, Electronics and data analysis centre at Bengaluru and the setting up at Gauri Bidanur of a large low frequency array for studies of galactic and extragalactic structure. In 1971, the former Astrophysical Observatory was converted to an autonomous research Institute wholly financed by the Government of India, and to be known henceforth as the Indian Institute of Astrophysics. Presently, the Indian Institute of Astrophysics functions under the control of the Department of Science and Technology, Government of India.

== Academics ==
The Institute awards two types of degrees.

- PhD
- Integrated MTech-PhD

== Notable faculty ==
- Vainu Bappu
- Vinod Krishan
- Annapurni Subramaniam

== See also ==
- List of astronomical observatories
- Mauritius Radio Telescope, a project co-led by the IIA
- Prajval Shastri
