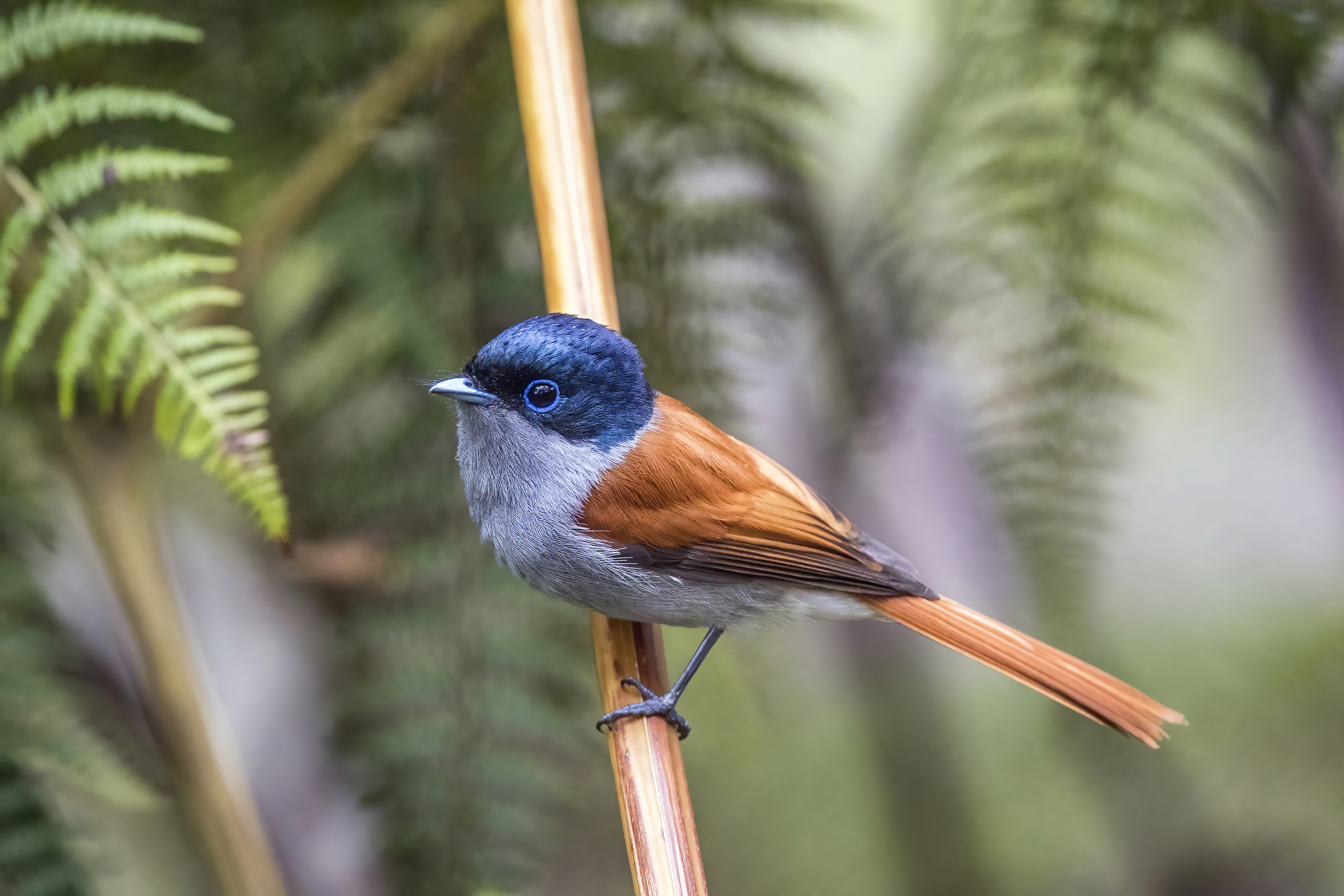
- Male
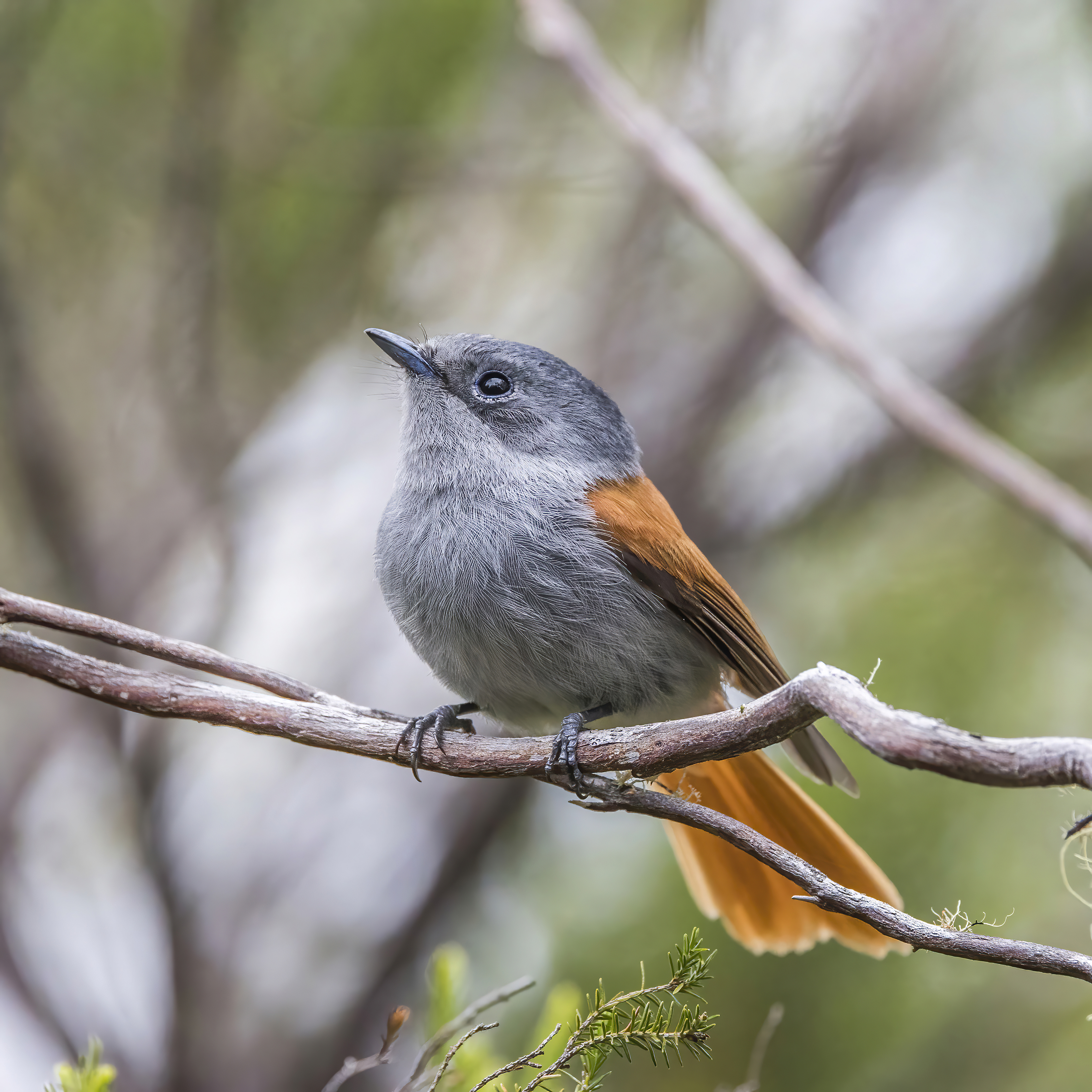
- Female both T. b. bourbonnensis on the slopes of la Roche Écrite, La Réunion

Conservation status
- Least Concern (IUCN 3.1)

Scientific classification
- Kingdom: Animalia
- Phylum: Chordata
- Class: Aves
- Order: Passeriformes
- Family: Monarchidae
- Genus: Terpsiphone
- Species: T. bourbonnensis

Binomial name
- Terpsiphone bourbonnensis (Statius Müller, 1776)

Subspecies
- See text

Synonyms
- Muscicapa bourbonnensis

= Mascarene paradise flycatcher =

Species of bird

The Mascarene paradise flycatcher (Terpsiphone bourbonnensis) is a species of bird in the monarch-flycatcher family Monarchidae. It is endemic to the Mascarene islands of Mauritius and Réunion. There are two subspecies recognized: the nominate subspecies from Réunion, also known as the Réunion paradise flycatcher; and T. b. desolata (Salomonsen, 1933) from Mauritius. However, recent genetic studies have shown that the two populations represent distinct evolutionary lineages. The Mascarene paradise flycatcher was originally described in the genus Muscicapa and the subspecies T. b. desolata was originally described as a separate species.

== Description ==
The Mascarene paradise flycatcher lacks the long tail shared by many members of the paradise flycatcher genus Terpsiphone, and measures 15 to 20 cm (5.9–7.9 in) in length. The male has a black head with a grey neck-band, throat, breast and belly. The upperparts and tail are chestnut, and the wings are tipped black. The bill is bright blue, and the legs greyish. The female is smaller than the male, with a paler bill and a dark-grey head. The subspecies T. b. desolata is larger than the nominate and has brighter plumage.

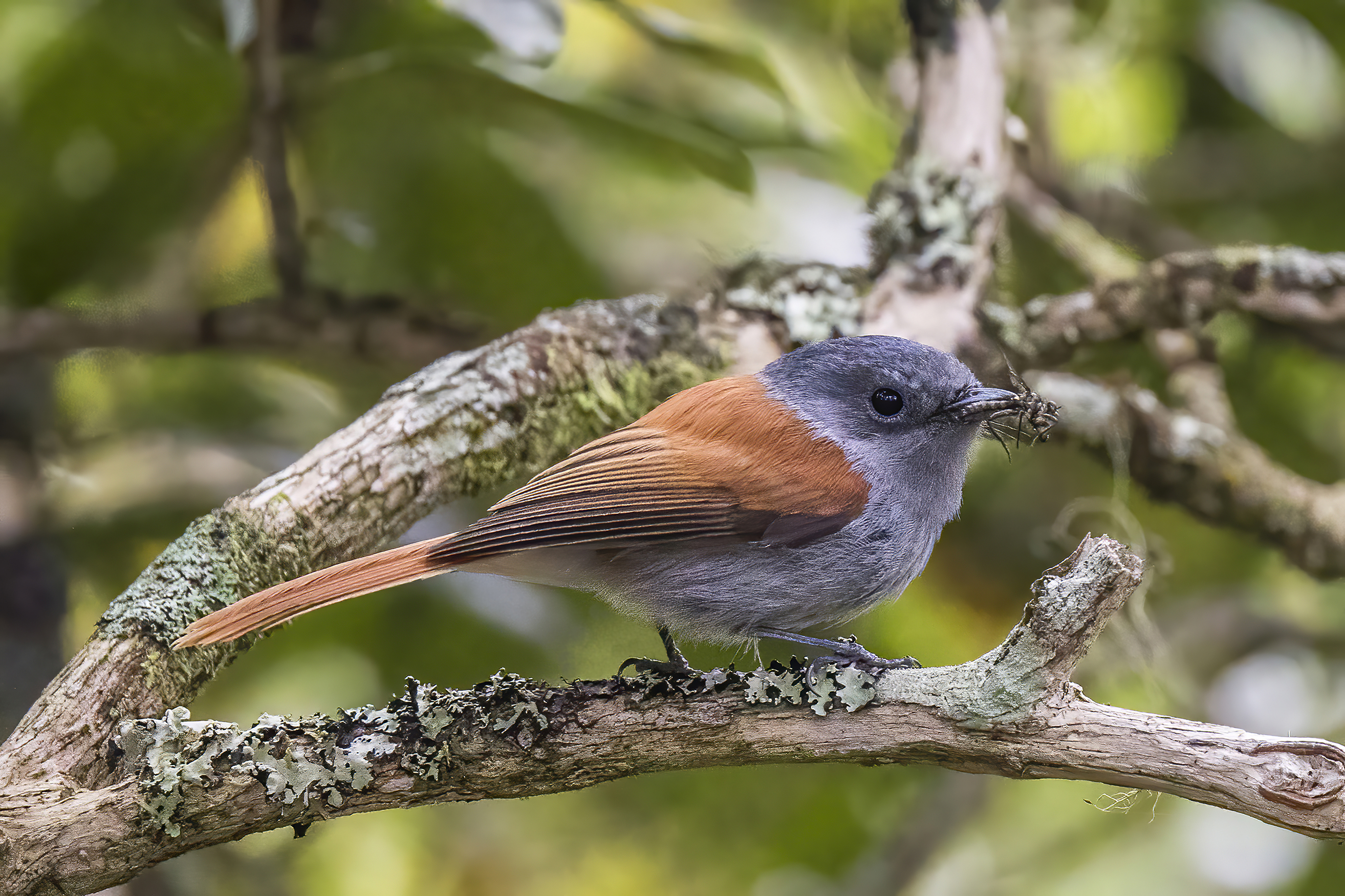
juvenile T. b. bourbonnensis, La Réunion

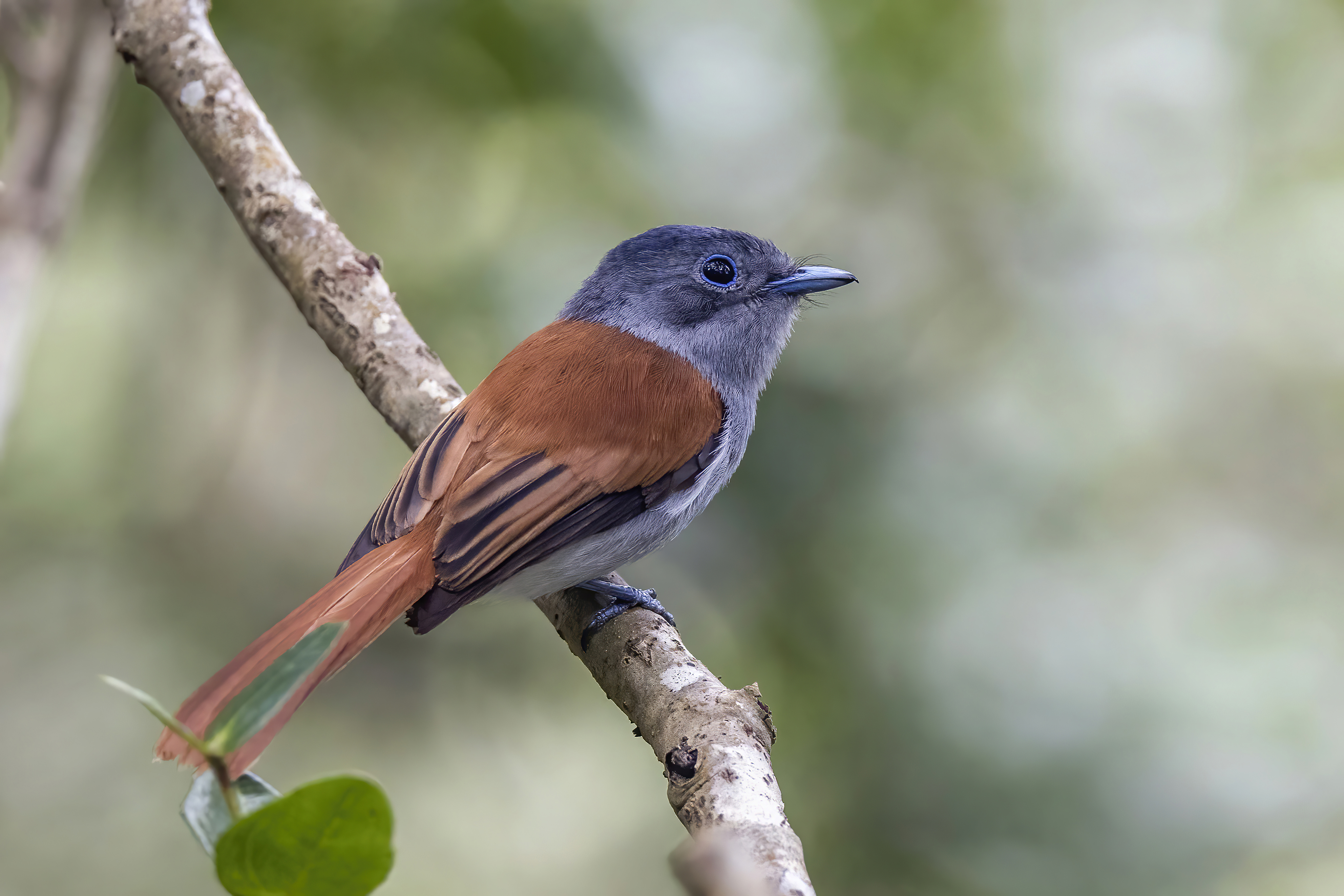
juvenile T. b. desolata, Mauritius

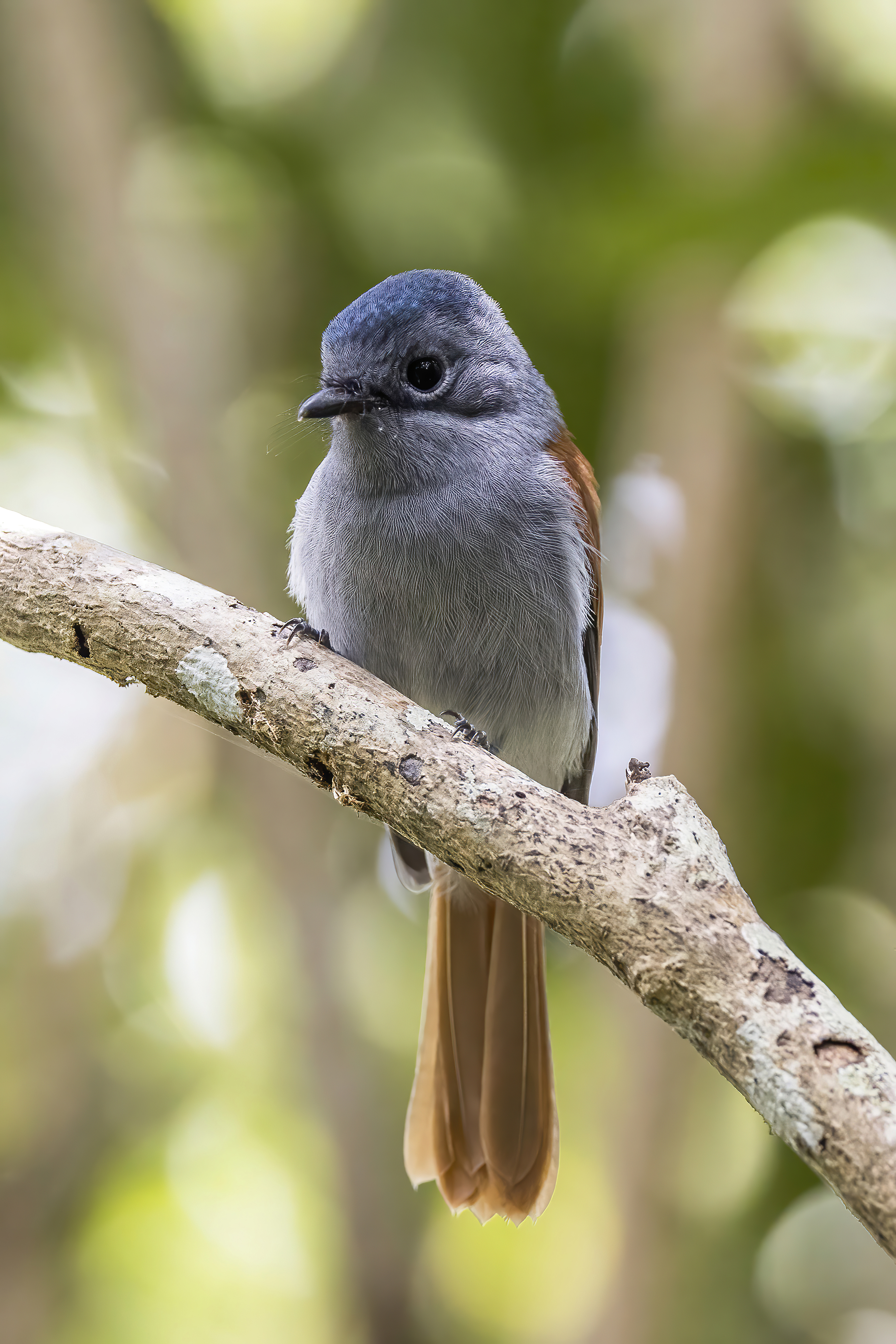
juvenile T. b. desolata, Mauritius

== Habitat ==
The habitat requirements of this species vary by subspecies. T. b. desolata is mostly restricted to native evergreen and some plantations of Araucaria cunninghamii and A. columnaris. Its preferred habitat seems to be a closed canopy with still air but not too much undergrowth. The nominate subspecies on Réunion is more varied in its habitat, occupying a range of forested habitats from sea level to 500–600 m (1,600–2,000 ft).

== Taxonomy ==
Molecular phylogenetic studies have identified the Mauritius and Réunion populations as distinct Evolutionarily Significant Units (ESUs), indicating genetic divergence and independent evolutionary histories despite their classification as subspecies of the Mascarene paradise flycatcher.

== Behaviour ==
=== Diet and feeding ===
The Mascarene paradise flycatcher feeds on a range of insects, including beetles, flies, dragonflies, moths, grasshoppers, and mayflies. Prey is obtained by watching from a perch and then hawking from the air or sally-gleaning off vegetation. It may also glean insects off vegetation while perched. They usually feed alone, but may join flocks of white-eyes; this behaviour is more common on Réunion than Mauritius.

=== Breeding ===
Breeding is seasonal, from August to February on Mauritius and September to December on Réunion. The nest is a cone-shaped cup of moss, lichen and spiderweb. Two to three creamy or pink-white eggs, with rusty spots are laid and then incubated by both parents for 14–16 days. Chicks are fed for five weeks after hatching and remain in their parent's territory for 8–9 weeks after fledging.
