= National Quantum Mission India =

The National Quantum Mission is an Indian government initiative intended to promote the development of quantum computers. It is one of nine missions of national importance under the Prime Minister's Science and Technology Innovation Advisory Council (PM-STIAC). Its Mission Governing Board is chaired by HCLTech co-founder Ajai Chowdhry, who announced plans to build a 6-qubit quantum computer within a year, (Note: End-to-end testing of a 6-qubit quantum processor was completed on 28 August 2024 by scientists at DYSL-QT.) followed by a 20–50-qubit quantum computer within the next three years, a 50–100-qubit quantum computer within the next five years, and a 50–1,000-qubit quantum computer within the next ten years.

The National Quantum Mission was launched on 19 April 2023 with a budget of ₹6,003.65 crore. With the initiative's launch, India became the seventh country to have a quantum computing-related initiative, after United States, Austria, Finland, France, Canada and China. The National Quantum Mission is set to run from 2023 to 2031.

The National Quantum Mission is helping C-DAC build a quantum reference facility at its campus in Bangalore. The facility is expected to be completed and fully operational within the next three years.

== Thematic hubs ==
In January 2024, the National Quantum Mission issued a call for proposals via which it invited academic and research institutions to contribute to the development of technology in four areas:

- Quantum computing
- Quantum communication
- Quantum sensing and metrology
- Quantum materials and devices

After receiving 384 submissions from across the country, the National Quantum Mission announced four thematic hubs on 30 September. The Indian Institute of Science in Bangalore was made a thematic hub for quantum computing, and IIT Madras was selected for quantum communication. Similarly, IIT Bombay and IIT Delhi were selected to be thematic hubs for quantum sensing and metrology, and quantum materials and devices, respectively.

== See also ==
- QpiAI-Indus
- Quantum computing in India
