= World Quantum Day =

Quantum science and technology event

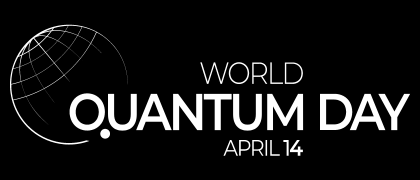
- Also called: WQD
- Type: International
- Date: April 14
- Frequency: Annual
- First time: 14 April 2022

World Quantum Day is an international event celebrated annually on 14 April since 2022. It aims at promoting public awareness and understanding of quantum science and quantum technology around the world. The date, 14 April, was chosen as a reference to "4.14", the rounded first three digits of the Planck constant.

== History ==
The proposal to celebrate the World Quantum Day was launched on 14 April 2021 as an initiative by an international group of scientists. It was launched as a decentralized initiative, for promoting public awareness and understanding of quantum science and quantum technology, planned to be celebrated across various places across the world. The initiative was later joined by engineers, educators, science communicators, and scientific organizations. The first World Quantum day was celebrated a year after the launch, on 14 April 2022.

The date, 14 April, was chosen as a reference to "4.14", the rounded first three digits of the Planck constant: 4.14×10^{−15} eV·s.

The United States Senate passed a resolution on 2 May 2023, commemorating and supporting the World Quantum Day initiative.

== Organization and events ==
The global organization and initiative are supported by the World Quantum Day Coordination Team, which includes representatives from more than 65 countries. Each participating country has one or two representatives in the World Quantum Day network. The first World Quantum Day, celebrated in 2022, included over 200 events in more than 40 countries across five continents. More than 400 events were conducted in 2023, and 530 events were conducted across 318 cities in 83 countries in 2026. While the World Quantum Day is celebrated on 14 April, the events are not necessarily held on the same day, and are spread throughout the entire week.

The activities included talks, symposiums, panel discussions, laboratory tours, artistic creations, and interviews.
