= Ajai Chowdhry =

Indian businessperson (born 1950)

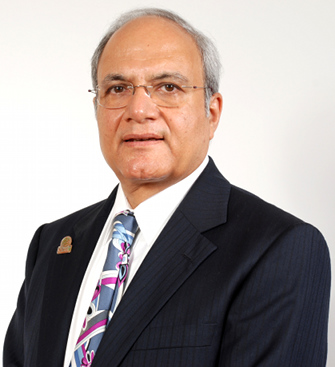
- Ajai Chowdhry
- Born: 29 August 1950 (age 76); Mount Abu, Rajasthan, India
- Education: Jabalpur Engineering College
- Occupations: Founder, HCL, Chairman: National Institute of Foundry and Forge Technology (NIFFT), Ranchi, IIIT -Naya Raipur
- Awards: Padma Bhushan

Ajai Chowdhry (born 29 August 1950) is one of the six founding members of HCL (Hindustan Computers Limited). He is currently the Chairman-Board of Governors at National Institute of Foundry and Forge Technology (NIFFT), Ranchi, International Institute of Information Technology, and Naya Raipur. Chowdhry is also a member of India Semiconductor Mission's advisory board.

== Early life and education ==
Ajai's parents moved from West Punjab in British India along with their six children, during the Partition of India. They arrived at a camp for refugees in Delhi. Later, in order to obtain the accession to the princely realms, Ajai's father took a work in Mount Abu

Ajai was born on 29 August 1950, in Mount Abu. The youngest of the seven siblings is Ajai. In 1955, his father joined Indian Administrative Service.

Ajai Chowdhry attended Christ Church School in Jabalpur for his formal education. He completed his education in 1966. A Bachelor of Engineering (Electronics and Telecom) degree was awarded to him later from Jabalpur Engineering College, in 1971. He also completed a programme for executives at the University of Michigan, in 1994. Ajai was also nominated by MeitY as India Semiconductor Mission's advisory board member. Chowdhry was a member of the Consultation Group focused on Science, Technology and Innovation by the Niti Aayog

== Career ==
Beginning his career in 1972, Ajai Chowdhry worked with Delhi Cloth & General Mills (DCM) Data Products where he was a sales trainee, hired at a compensation of INR 600 per month in the electronics division. In 1975, he quit his job to start his own company named "Micro comp".

In August 2009, the Department of Information Technology, Ministry of Communications & IT and the Government of India constituted the IT Task Force, under the leadership of Ajai Chowdhry The task force warned that the import bill of electronics will be higher than that of oil - thus shaping the electronics policy of the country.

Ajai Chowdhry was a member of the National Manufacturing Competitiveness Council (NMCC), which is an apex body providing advisory inputs for shaping government policy.

== Just Aspire ==
Ajai Chowdhry also authored a book titled Just Aspire in 2023 which talks about his own life and also reflects on the journey of India's IT and hardware industry. The book was published by Harper Business.Scroll published an excerpt from the book, "As one of our later print ads proclaimed, “At HCL, there's only one thing more important than brains. Guts.” We trained our sales team in transactional analysis techniques, which call for an assessment of, and adaptation to, the potential buyer. For instance, when you meet a professor, become a student."

== Awards and accolades ==
- In 2011, the Government of India awarded Ajai Chowdhry with Padma Bhushan, the third-highest civilian award, recognising his consistent contribution to the Indian IT industry.
- In 2014, Ajai Chowdhry was honoured with the Cybermedia Business ICT Award 2013 for Lifetime Achievement in ICT by Narendra Modi.
- In 2014, Ajai Chowdhry was awarded Honoris Causa (D.Sc.) by the Indian Institute of Information Technology, Design & Manufacturing, Jabalpur in recognition of the significant contribution he has made to the Indian IT industry and thought leadership in the field.
- In 2010, Ajai Chowdhry was conferred the Honoris Causa, Doctorate of Science, by IIT Roorkee.
- In 2009, Ajai Chowdhry was ranked third in the "Power List of 75 Most Powerful Brand Builders of India".
- In 2009, Ajai Chowdhry was adjudged among "India Inc's Most Powerful CEOs" by The Economic Times.
- The Foundation of Indian Industry and Economists presented Ajai Chowdhry with the "Best IT Man of the Year" award in 2007.
- Chowdhry worked as the Chairman of IIIT Naya Raipur in 2019.
- Chairman of the CII National Committee on Technology.
- Panellist at the USC Forum on Globalization and Innovation.
- Co-chaired the ‘World Economic Forum on Africa in Tanzania.

== Investor ==
As an investor, Ajai is on board of Indian Angel Network and has invested in several start ups. He also serves as the chairman of FICCI Startup Committee.

== Philanthropy ==
Ajai co-founded EPIC Foundation in 2021. The goal of the foundation was to focus on developing electronic products that could be of national importance. Ajai serves as the chairman of the foundation and has works with other expert global advisors.

== Personal life and family ==
Ajai was married in 1977 to Kunkun Chowdhry. He has two sons, Kunal and Akshay.
