= DRDO Young Scientist Laboratories =

Specialised research laboratories in India

DRDO Young Scientist Laboratories (DYSLs) are five specialised research laboratories located in five different cities of India, inaugurated by the Prime Minister of India on 2 January 2020. Each laboratory deals with a focused area of science - artificial intelligence, quantum technologies, cognitive technologies, asymmetric technologies and smart materials. The labs are located in Bengaluru, Mumbai, Chennai, Kolkata and Hyderabad. As per the norms laid out, everyone, including director, at the labs is under 35 years of age. DRDO Chairman G.Satheesh Reddy conveyed to The Hindu on 3 January 2020 that the laboratories are formally operational.

Two of the directors chosen are scientists Parvathaneni Shiva Prasad of the Research Centre Imarat (RCI) and Ramakrishnan Raghavan of the Defence Metallurgical Research Laboratory (DMRL). They will be function as completely independent directors of their respective labs. The directors have been finalised by a committee chaired by Principal Scientific Advisor K. Vijayaraghavan. The push for the labs came in August 2014 when Narendra Modi suggested DRDO give young talent in India opportunities and leadership abilities in challenging areas of science.

The five research laboratories are:

1. Artificial Intelligence at Bengaluru.
2. Quantum technologies at IIT Bombay.
3. Cognitive Technologies at IIT Madras.
4. Asymmetric Technologies at Kolkata.
5. Smart materials at Hyderabad.

== See also ==
- Defence Research and Development Establishment
