= Udgaonkar =

Udgaonkar is a surname. Notable people with the surname include:

- Bhalchandra Udgaonkar (1927–2014), Indian physicist
- Jayant B. Udgaonkar (born 1960), Indian biochemist
