= Thangaraj =

Thangaraj is a surname. Notable people with the surname include:

- Peter Thangaraj, Indian footballer
- Mano Thangaraj, Indian politician
- Kumaraswamy Thangaraj, Indian geneticist
- M. Thomas Thangaraj, Indian theologian
- Pugazhendhi Thangaraj, Indian film director and screenwriter
