= Vivek Polshettiwar =

Indian chemist

Vivek Vijayrao Polshettiwar
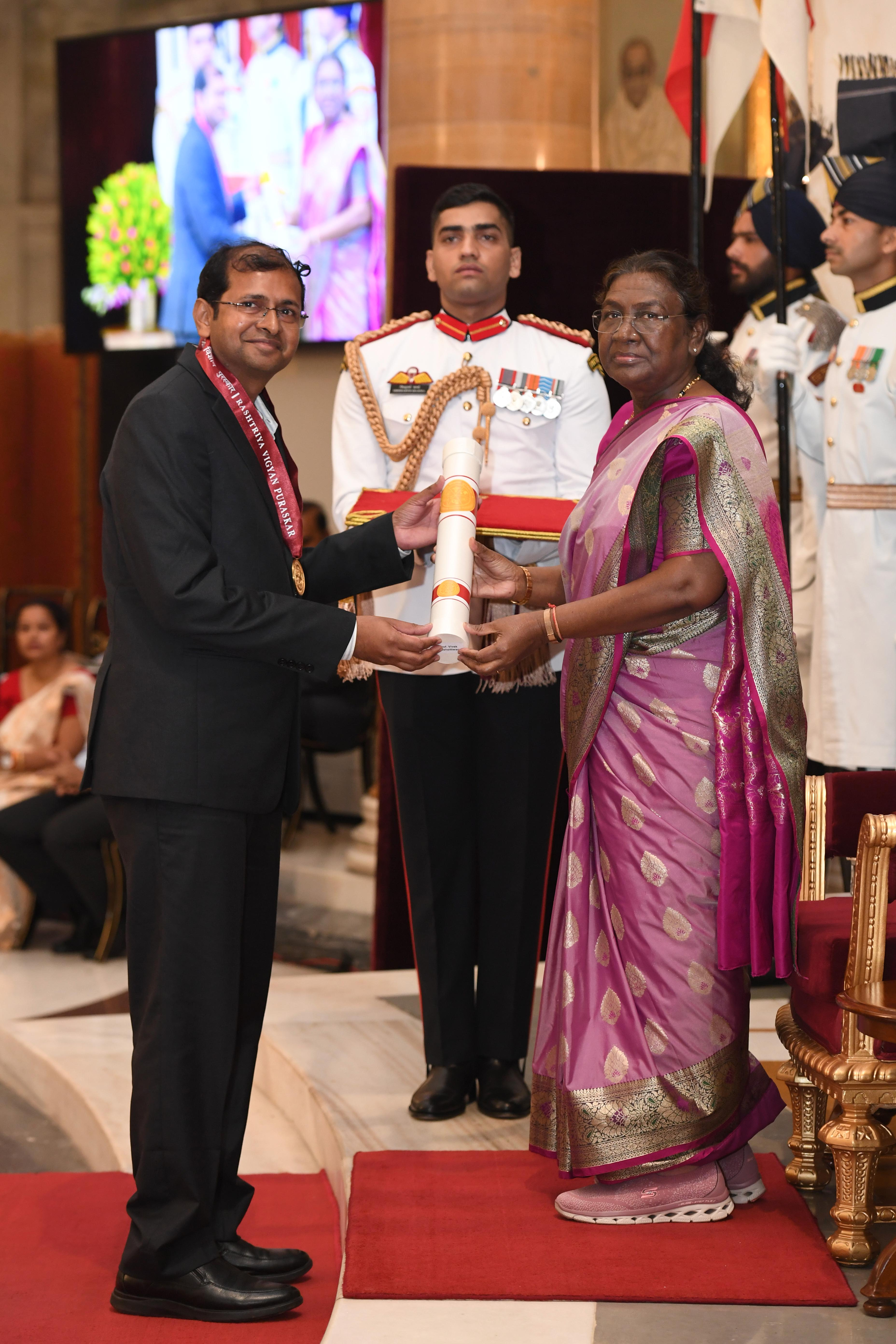
- Polshettiwar receiving the Shanti Swarup Bhatnagar (SSB) Award from the President of India
- Born: 18 March 1979 (age 47); Mangli (Dist-Yavatmal, Maharashtra)
- Education: Sant Gadge Baba Amravati University Maharashtra
- Scientific career
- Workplaces: Tata Institute of Fundamental Research; United States Environmental Protection Agency; King Abdullah University of Science and Technology
- Website: https://www.nanocat.co.in/

Vivek Vijayrao Polshettiwar (born 18 March 1979) is an Indian chemist who is a professor of chemistry at the Tata Institute of Fundamental Research. His research focuses on advanced nanomaterials and nanocatalysis, particularly for harvesting solar energy and converting carbon dioxide into valuable chemicals and fuels. His work is aimed at producing value-added products from CO_{2} to effectively combat climate change. He was awarded the International Union of Pure and Applied Chemistry prize for Green Chemistry in 2022. In 2023, he received the Falling Walls Award in Physical Sciences. The following year, in 2024, he was elected as a Fellow of the Indian Academy of Sciences (FASc). In 2024, he received Shanti Swarup Bhatnagar (SSB) award from the President of India; the highest and most prestigious award given in the area of science in India .

== Early life and education ==
Polshettiwar was born in Mangli, a village in the Yavatmal district within the Vidarbha region of Maharashtra. He began his education in Zilla Parishad government schools, which had limited infrastructure and often lacked sufficient teachers, with many of his classes taking place under trees or in temporary shelters.

For high school, he moved to the nearby village of Mukutban, where he attended Adarsh Highschool. He then pursued his 12th science and BSc degree at Lokmanya Tilak Mahavidyalaya in Wani. In 2001, Polshettiwar earned his Master's degree in Chemistry from Amravati University, Amravati.

He earned his doctorate at DRDE and Jiwaji University in Gwalior. After earning his doctorate, he moved to the ENSCM: Ecole Nationale Suprieure de chimie de Montpellier in France, where he spent one year as a postdoctoral researcher. He was awarded an Oak Ridge Institute for Science and Education Research Fellowship and joined the United States Environmental Protection Agency in 2007.

== Research and career ==
In 2009, Polshettiwar launched his independent career at King Abdullah University of Science and Technology. He returned to India in 2013, where he started working on nanomaterials at the Tata Institute of Fundamental Research. His research considers nanocatalysis: the design of sustainable, reactive, stable and selective catalysts. He believes that the activity and kinetics of nanocatalysts can be influenced by tuning the morphology and defects of the catalyst.

Polshettiwar has primarily focused on dendritic fibrous nanosilica, which has a fibrous structure that enhances the surface area on which reactions can occur. His innovations in producing efficient dendritic fibrous nanosilica catalysts were made possible by altering the nanoscale properties of the material, specifically, the spacing between the nanostructures themselves. These dendritic fibrous nanosilica catalysts can capture carbon dioxide and convert it to fuel and useful chemicals. He has created amorphous aluminosilicates that can convert plastics to hydrocarbons at low temperature, contributing to a circular economy.

Polshettiwar's research encompasses several key areas in nanocatalysis. One notable achievement is the development of "Black Gold," a system designed to study plasmonic hot electron generation and transfer. This model mimics natural photosynthesis, using sunlight, water, and CO_{2} to offer potential sustainable energy solutions. Another significant focus of his work is the exploration of defects in nanomaterials as active catalytic sites, presenting a new approach to catalyst design that avoids the need for metals or complex organic ligands. Additionally, his group has developed "Acidic Amorphous Aluminosilicate," which combines the strong acidity of zeolites with the textural properties of aluminosilicates. This material has shown promise in converting plastics to chemicals and CO_{2} to fuel.

== Awards and honours ==
- 1999 Eklavya Scholarship (for meritorious performance during BSc by Gov. of Maharashtra)
- 2002 DRDO Research Fellowship (during PhD by Government of India)
- 2005 Postdoc Research Fellowship (at ENSCM by Science & Education Ministry, France)
- 2007 ORISE Research Fellowship (for the development of independent scientist by ORISE & USEPA)
- 2015 Fellow of Royal Society of Chemistry
- 2016 Journal of Materials Chemistry A Rising Stars of Materials Chemistry
- 2019 Fellow of the Maharashtra Academy of Sciences
- 2019 Materials Research Society of India Medal
- 2020 Young Career Award in Nano Science & Technology by Nano Mission
- 2021 Fellow of the National Academy of Sciences of India
- 2022 IUPAC-CHEMRAWN VII Prize for Green Chemistry
- 2023 Falling Walls: Winner in Physical Sciences
- 2024 Elected as a Fellow of the Indian Academy of Sciences, Bangalore (FASc)
- 2024 Awarded Prestigious Vigyan Yuva- Shanti Swarup Bhatnagar (VY-SSB) Award by the President of India.

== Selected publications ==
- Dendritic Fibrous Nano-Silica (DFNS): Discovery, Synthesis, Formation Mechanism, Catalysis, and CO_{2} Capture-Conversion. Vivek Polshettiwar* ACS Accounts of Chemical Research, 2022, 55, 1395–1410.
- Pt-Doped Ru Nanoparticles Loaded on ‘Black Gold’ Plasmonic Nanoreactors as Air Stable Reduction Catalysts. Gunjan Sharma, Rishi Verma, Shinya Masuda, Khaled Mohamed Badawy, Nirpendra Singh, Tatsuya Tsukuda,* Vivek Polshettiwar* Nature Communication 2024, 15, 713.
- Nickel Laden Dendritic Plasmonic Colloidosomes of Black Gold: Forced Plasmon Mediated CO_{2} Hydrogenation using Solar Energy. Rishi Verma, Rajesh Belgamwar, P. Chatterjee, R. B. Vadell, Jacinto Sá and Vivek Polshettiwar* ACS Nano, 2023 17, 4526–4538.
- Surface Plasmon-Enhanced Photo-Driven CO_{2} Hydrogenation by Hydroxy Terminated Nickel Nitride Nanosheets. Saideep Singh, R. Verma, N. Kaul, J. Sa, Vivek Polshettiwar,* Nature Communication 2023, 14, 2551
- Defects Tune the Strong Metal-Support Interactions in Copper Supported on Defected Titanium Dioxide Catalyst for CO_{2} Reduction. Rajesh Belgamwar, Rishi Verma, Tisita Das, Sudip Chakraborty, Pradip Sarawade, Vivek Polshettiwar* J. Am. Chem. Soc. 2023, 145, 8634-8646.
- Defects in Nanosilica Catalytically Convert CO_{2} to Methane without Any Metal and Ligand. Amit K. Mishra, R. Belgamwar, R. Jana, A. Datta, and Vivek Polshettiwar*, Proc. Natl. Acad. Sci. U.S.A 2020, 117, 6383-6390.
- Facile Synthesis Protocol to Tune Size, Textural Properties & Fiber Density of Dendritic Fibrous Nanosilica (DFNS): Applications in Catalysis and CO_{2} Capture. Ayan Maity, R. Belgamwar, Vivek Polshettiwar,* Nature Protocol, 2019, 14, 2177-2204
- Nanosponges of Acidic Amorphous Aluminosilicate for Catalysis, Plastic Degradation and CO_{2} to Fuel Conversion. Ayan Maity, S. Chaudhari, J. J. Titman, Vivek Polshettiwar*, Nature Commun. 2020, 11, 3828.
