= Umesh Varshney =

Indian molecular biologist

- Born: 26 October 1957 (age 68); India
- Education: Jiwaji University; G. B. Pant University of Agriculture and Technology; University of Calgary; Massachusetts Institute of Technology
- Known for: Protein synthesis and DNA repair of Mycobacterium tuberculosis
- Awards: 1999 N-BIOS Award; 2001 Shanti Swarup Bhatnagar Prize; 2001 SBC P. S. Sarma Memorial Award; 2002 Novo Nordisk Life Sciences Research Award
- Scientific career
- Fields: Molecular biology
- Workplaces: Indian Institute of Science
- Doctoral advisor: Lashitew Gedamu; Hans van de Sande

Umesh Varshney (born 1957) is an Indian molecular biologist, academician and the head of a laboratory at the Indian Institute of Science, Bengaluru. He is the recipient of Vigyan Shree award, 2024 from the president of India. He is a J. C. Bose National Fellow of the Department of Science and Technology and is known for his studies on protein synthesis and DNA repair in Escherichia coli and Mycobacterium tuberculosis. An elected fellow of the Indian Academy of Sciences, Indian National Science Academy and the National Academy of Sciences (India), he is also a recipient of the National Bioscience Award for Career Development of the Government of India. The Council of Scientific and Industrial Research, awarded him the Shanti Swarup Bhatnagar Prize for Science and Technology, one of the highest Indian science awards, in 2001, and then in 2014 with the G. N. Ramachandran Gold Medal for Excellence in Biological Sciences & Technology for his contributions to biological sciences.

== Biography ==
Umesh Varshney, born on 26 October 1957 in the Indian state of Uttar Pradesh, graduated in science from Jiwaji University in 1975 and completed his master's degree at G. B. Pant University of Agriculture and Technology in 1979. Moving to Canada, he did his doctoral studies on a Graduate Teaching Assistantship and Studentship by Alberta Heritage Foundation for Medical Research Foundation (AHFMR) under the guidance of Lashitew Gedamu and secured his doctoral degree from the University of Calgary in 1985. His post-doctoral studies were at the laboratory of Johan Hans van de Sande at the university and, later, at Massachusetts Institute of Technology with U. L. Raj Bhandary. Returning to India in 1991, he started his career at the Department of Microbiology and Cell Biology (then known as Centre for Genetic Engineering) of the Indian Institute of Science as an assistant professor, and promoted to associate professor (1997), professor (2002) and dean of the undergraduate programs and heads a laboratory while chairing the Department of Microbiology and Cell Biology of the Indian Institute of Science. He is also an honorary faculty at Jawaharlal Nehru Centre for Advanced Scientific Research since 1999 and is a collaborator of the Genome Metabolism and Biostruct Laboratory, Budapest. He is currently the Chairman of the division of Biological Sciences at the Indian Institute of Science, Bengaluru.

== Legacy ==
Varhsney's researches are primarily focused in the area of protein synthesis and DNA repair in Escherichia coli and Mycobacterium tuberculosis. His researches are known to have assisted in a wider understanding of the biology of mycobacterium, more specifically the interaction between ribosome recycling factor and elongation factor G as well as the uracil excision repair pathway. These studies are reported to have been aimed at developing newer drug targets and the attenuated strains. He has detailed his research findings by way of articles published in peer-reviewed journals (Note: Please see Selected bibliography section) and online scientific article repositories like ResearchGate, Google Scholar and PubFacts have listed many of them. He was one of the organizers of the 21st International tRNA Workshop held at Indian Institute of Science in December 2005, has guided several scholars in their doctoral researches and delivered keynote addresses at many science conferences.

== Awards and honors ==
In 1999, when the Department of Biotechnology of India instituted the National Bioscience Award for Career Development as one of the prestigious science awards in the country, Umesh Varshney was among the first recipients of the award. The Council of Scientific and Industrial Research awarded him the Shanti Swarup Bhatnagar Prize in 2001, and then in 2014 he was awarded the G. N. Ramachandran Gold Medal for Excellence in Biological Sciences & Technology. In 2001, he received the P. S. Sarma Memorial Award of the Society of Biological Chemists (India) (SBC). A life member of the SBC, he received the Life Sciences Research Award of Novo Nordisk Education Foundation in 2002 and the year 2008 brought him the elected fellowship of the Indian National Science Academy and the J. C. Bose National Fellowship of the Department of Science and Technology of India. He was awarded the Vigyan Shri Award under Rashtriya Vigyan Puraskar scheme in 2024.

== Selected bibliography ==
- Sunil Shetty, Umesh Varshney (October 2016). "An evolutionarily conserved element in initiator tRNAs prompts ultimate steps in ribosome maturation". Proceedings of the National Academy of Sciences. 113 (41): E6126–E6134. Bibcode:2016PNAS..113E6126S. doi:10.1073/pnas.1609550113. PMC 5068261. PMID 27698115.
- Sunil Shetty, Riyaz AHMAD Shah, Ullas V. Chembazhi, Shivjee Sah, Umesh Varshney (September 2016). "Two highly conserved features of bacterial initiator tRNAs license them to pass through distinct checkpoints in translation initiation". Nucleic Acids Research. 45 (4): 2040–2050. doi:10.1093/nar/gkw854. PMC 5389676. PMID 28204695.
- Amandeep Singh, Umesh Varshney, M. Vijayan (September 2016). "Structure of the second Single Stranded DNA Binding protein (SSBb) from Mycobacterium smegmatis". Journal of Structural Biology. 196 (3): 448–454. doi:10.1016/j.jsb.2016.09.012. PMID 27659385.
- Souvik Bhattacharyya, Umesh Varshney (June 2016). "Evolution of initiator tRNAs and selection of methionine as the initiating amino acid". RNA Biology. 13 (9): 810–819. doi:10.1080/15476286.2016.1195943. PMC 5013993. PMID 27322343.
- Bo Qin, Hiroshi Yamamoto, Takuya Ueda, Umesh Varshney, Knud H Nierhaus (May 2016). "The Termination Phase in Protein Synthesis is not Obligatorily Followed by the RRF/EF-G-Dependent Recycling Phase". Journal of Molecular Biology. 428 (18): 3577–3587. doi:10.1016/j.jmb.2016.05.019. PMID 27261258.
- Pau Biak Sang, Thiruneelakantan Srinath, Aravind Goud G Patil, Eui-Jeon Woo, Umesh Varshney (August 2015). "A unique uracil-DNA binding protein of the uracil DNA glycosylase superfamily". Nucleic Acids Research. 43 (17): 8452–8463. doi:10.1093/nar/gkv854. PMC 4787834. PMID 26304551.Srinivas Aluri, Kervin Rex, Umesh Varshney (June 2015). "Simultaneous presence of fhs and purT genes is disadvantageous for the fitness of Escherichia coli growth". FEMS Microbiology Letters. 362 (14) fnv101. doi:10.1093/femsle/fnv101. PMID 26100103.
