= Rashtriya Vigyan Puraskar =

- Awarded for: Research, technology, innovation
- Sponsored by: Government of India
- Country: India
- Presented by: Government of India
- Rewards: Certificate and medallion
- First award: 2024; 2 years ago
- Website: awards.gov.in

Rashtriya Vigyan Puraskar is a National Award instituted by the Government of India to recognize the contributions of outstanding researchers in the fields of science, technology and innovation. The award has been the subject of controversy because the final selection of awardees is conducted by a political official, the Minister of Science and Technology, rather than a scientific committee.

== Background ==
The institution of this award was announced in January 2024 and the names of the first set of awardees were announced on 7 August 2024. The awards were distributed on 22 August 2024, a day ahead of the National Space Day. In 2025, the awards were announced on 25 October 2025. The award consists of a certificate signed by the President of India and a medallion.

== Eligibility ==
Scientists, technologists and innovators working in Govt. or private organizations in India who have done highly impactful research, discovery or innovation are eligible for the award. Moreover, such persons of Indian origin and working abroad are also eligible for the award.

== The selection process ==
The nominations for the award are initially scrutinized by a 17-member panel headed by the Principal Scientific Advisor to Govt of India from a list of nominated persons. Other members of the panel are Secretaries of the six Science Ministries/Departments (DST, DBT, CSIR, MoES, DoS and DAE), four select Presidents of the Science and Engineering Academies and six distinguished scientists and technologists from different fields of Science and Technology. Nominations can be made by any individual, institution, State Govts, Depts/Ministries of Govt of India, heads of national science bodies, etc.

The panel recommends names to the Minister of Science and Technology who performs the final selection of awardees. In 2024 the inaugural year of the award, the Minister is believed to have overruled the scientific committee to exclude scientists seen as critical of the government leading several scientists to write to the government objecting to this method of selection.

== Rashtriya Vigyan Puraskar awardees of the year 2024 ==
The following are the Rashtriya Vigyan Puraskar awardees of the year 2024.

Sl. No.	Award	Name	Field/Domain	Institute/Organisation/University
1	Vigyan Ratna Award	Prof. Govindarajan Padmanabhan	Biological Sciences	Indian Institute of Science (IISc), Bengaluru
2	Vigyan Shri	Dr. Anandharamakrishnan C	Agricultural Science	CSIR - National Institute for Interdisciplinary Science and Technology (NIIST), Thiruvananthapuram
3	Vigyan Shri	Dr. Avesh Kumar Tyagi	Atomic Energy	Bhabha Atomic Research Centre (BARC), Mumbai
4	Vigyan Shri	Prof. Umesh Varshney	Biological Sciences	Indian Institute of Science (IISc), Bangalore
5	Vigyan Shri	Prof. Jayant Bhalchandra Udgaonkar	Biological Sciences	Indian Institute of Science Education and Research Pune (IISER), Pune
6	Vigyan Shri	Prof. Syed Wajih Ahmad Naqvi	Earth Science	CSIR-National Botanical Research Institute (NBRI), Lucknow
7	Vigyan Shri	Prof. Bhim Singh	Engineering Sciences	Indian Institute of Technology (IIT-D), Delhi
8	Vigyan Shri	Prof. Adimurthi Adi	Mathematics and Computer Science	Indian Institute of Technology (IIT-K), Kanpur
9	Vigyan Shri	Prof. Rahul Mukherjee	Mathematics and Computer Science	Indian Institute of Management Calcutta (IIMC)
10	Vigyan Shri	Prof. Dr Sanjay Behari	Medicine	Sree Chitra Tirunal Institute for Medical Sciences and Technology, Thiruvananthapuram
11	Vigyan Shri	Prof. Lakshmanan Muthusamy	Physics	Bharathidasan University, Tiruchirappalli
12	Vigyan Shri	Prof. Naba Kumar Mondal	Physics	Saha Institute of Nuclear Physics, Kolkata
13	Vigyan Shri	Prof. Annapurni Subramaniam	Space Science and Technology	Indian Institute of Astrophysics, Bengaluru
14	Vigyan Shri	Prof Rohit Srivastava	Technology and Innovation	Indian Institute of Technology (IIT-B), Mumbai
15	Vigyan Yuva- Shanti Swarup Bhatnagar Award	Dr. Krishna Murthy S L	Agricultural Science	Indian Institute of Rice Research, Hyderabad
16	Vigyan Yuva- Shanti Swarup Bhatnagar Award	Dr. Swarup Kumar Parida	Agricultural Science	National Institute of Plant Genome Research, New Delhi
17	Vigyan Yuva- Shanti Swarup Bhatnagar Award	Prof. Radhakrishnan Mahalakshmi	Biological Sciences	Indian Institute of Science Education and Research (IISER), Bhopal
18	Vigyan Yuva- Shanti Swarup Bhatnagar Award	Prof. Aravind Penmatsa	Biological Sciences	Indian Institute of Science (IISc), Bengaluru
19	Vigyan Yuva- Shanti Swarup Bhatnagar Award	Prof. Vivek Polshettiwar	Chemistry	Tata Institute of Fundamental Research (TIFR), Mumbai
20	Vigyan Yuva- Shanti Swarup Bhatnagar Award	Prof. Vishal Rai	Chemistry	Indian Institute of Science Education and Research (IISER), Bhopal
21	Vigyan Yuva- Shanti Swarup Bhatnagar Award	Dr. Roxy Mathew Koll	Earth Science	Indian Institute of Tropical Meteorology (IITM), Pune
22	Vigyan Yuva- Shanti Swarup Bhatnagar Award	Dr. Abhilash	Engineering Sciences	CSIR-National Metallurgical Laboratory, Jamshedpur
23	Vigyan Yuva- Shanti Swarup Bhatnagar Award	Dr. Radha Krishna Ganti	Engineering Sciences	Indian Institute of Technology (IIT-M), Chennai
24	Vigyan Yuva- Shanti Swarup Bhatnagar Award	Dr. Purabi Saikia	Environmental Science	Central University of Jharkhand, Ranchi
25	Vigyan Yuva- Shanti Swarup Bhatnagar Award	Dr. Bappi Paul	Environmental Science	National Forensic Sciences University, Gandhinagar
26	Vigyan Yuva- Shanti Swarup Bhatnagar Award	Prof. Mahesh Ramesh Kakde	Mathematics and Computer Science	Indian Institute of Science (IISc), Bengaluru
27	Vigyan Yuva- Shanti Swarup Bhatnagar Award	Prof. Jitendra Kumar Sahu	Medicine	Postgraduate Institute of Medical Education & Research, Chandigarh
28	Vigyan Yuva- Shanti Swarup Bhatnagar Award	Dr. Pragya Dhruv Yadav	Medicine	ICMR-National Institute of Virology (NIV), Pune
29	Vigyan Yuva- Shanti Swarup Bhatnagar Award	Prof. Urbasi Sinha	Physics	Raman Research Institute, Bengaluru
30	Vigyan Yuva- Shanti Swarup Bhatnagar Award	Dr. Digendranath Swain	Space Science and Technology	ISRO-Vikram Sarabhai Space Center, Thiruvananthapuram
31	Vigyan Yuva- Shanti Swarup Bhatnagar Award	Dr. Prashant Kumar	Space Science and Technology	ISRO-Space Applications Centre, Ahmedabad
32	Vigyan Yuva- Shanti Swarup Bhatnagar Award	Prof. Prabhu Rajagopal	Technology and Innovation	Indian Institute of Technology (IIT-M), Chennai
33	Vigyan Team	ISRO - Team Chandrayaan 3	Space Science and Technology	Indian Space Research Organisation, Bengaluru

== Rashtriya Vigyan Puraskar awardees of the year 2025 ==
The following are the Rashtriya Vigyan Puraskar awardees of the year 2025.

Sl. No.	Award	Name	Field/Domain
1	Vigyan Ratna Award	Jayant Vishnu Narlikar	Physics
2	Vigyan Shri	Gyanendra Pratap Singh	Agricultural Science
3	Vigyan Shri	Yusuf Mohammad Seikh	Atomic Energy
4	Vigyan Shri	K. Thangaraj	Biological Sciences
5	Vigyan Shri	Thalappil Pradeep	Chemistry
6	Vigyan Shri	Aniruddha Bhalchandra Pandit	Engineering Sciences
7	Vigyan Shri	S Venkata Mohan	Environmental Science
8	Vigyan Shri	Mahan Mj	Mathematics and Computer Science
9	Vigyan Shri	Jayan N	Space Science and Technology
10	Vigyan Yuva-Shanti Swarup Bhatnagar Award	Jagdis Gupta Kapuganti	Agricultural Science
11	Vigyan Yuva-Shanti Swarup Bhatnagar Award	Satendra Kumar Mangrauthia	Agricultural Science
12	Vigyan Yuva-Shanti Swarup Bhatnagar Award	Debarka Sengupta	Biological Sciences
13	Vigyan Yuva-Shanti Swarup Bhatnagar Award	Deepa Agashe	Biological Sciences
14	Vigyan Yuva-Shanti Swarup Bhatnagar Award	Dibyendu Das	Chemistry
15	Vigyan Yuva-Shanti Swarup Bhatnagar Award	Waliur Rahaman	Earth Science
16	Vigyan Yuva-Shanti Swarup Bhatnagar Award	Arkaprava Basu	Engineering Sciences
17	Vigyan Yuva-Shanti Swarup Bhatnagar Award	Sabyasachi Mukherjee	Mathematics and Computer Science
18	Vigyan Yuva-Shanti Swarup Bhatnagar Award	Shweta Prem Agrawal	Mathematics and Computer Science
19	Vigyan Yuva-Shanti Swarup Bhatnagar Award	Suresh Kumar	Medicine
20	Vigyan Yuva-Shanti Swarup Bhatnagar Award	Amit Kumar Agarwal	Physics
21	Vigyan Yuva-Shanti Swarup Bhatnagar Award	Surhud More	Physics
22	Vigyan Yuva-Shanti Swarup Bhatnagar Award	Ankur Garg	Space Science and Technology
23	Vigyan Yuva-Shanti Swarup Bhatnagar Award	Mohanasankar Sivaprakasam	Technology and Innovation
24	Vigyan Team	Aroma Mission CSIR	Agricultural Science

== Controversy ==
The awards have attracted controversy due to the role played by political officials in the selection of awardees. Soon after the announcement of the inaugural awards in 2024, it was reported that the some of those selected by the scientific committee had been dropped in the final list announced by the Indian government. Initial media reports revealed that one of the individuals dropped was Suvrat Raju a physicist who had been critical of the government. Subsequently, 26 former winners of the Bhatnagar Prize wrote to the Principal Scientific Adviser to the Government of India expressing their concern that "unfair non-scientific considerations" may have influenced this year's awardees. Additional news reports revealed that at least two more scientists had been excluded: Prateek Sharma, a physicist who had signed open letters critical of the government, and Suman Chakraborty. After the appearance of these reports, the official rules governing the award were modified by the insertion of a new line stating that the scientific selection committee could only "recommend" names to the Minister for Science and Technology. In response to this change, 176 prominent Indian scientists wrote to the government stating that it was "shocking" for the Minister to have the "right to veto experts". However, the Indian government stated that its decisions were final and would not be altered.
