= Rohit Srivastava (scientist) =

Indian scientist

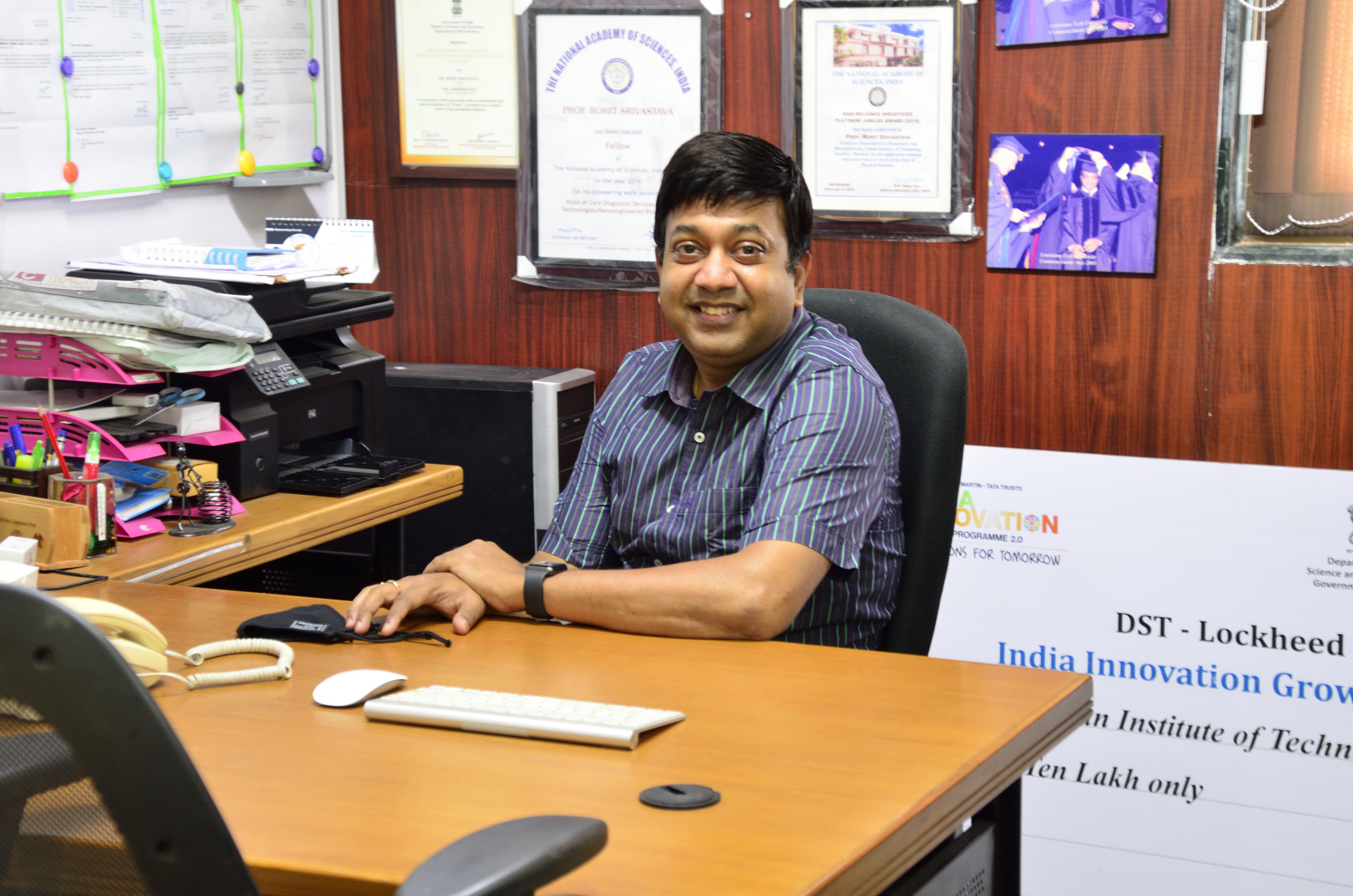
- In office at IIT Bombay
- Education: Visvesvaraya Regional College of Engineering (B.E.); Louisiana Tech University (PhD)
- Awards: Vigyan Shri 2024
- Scientific career
- Fields: Biomedical Engineering
- Workplaces: IIT Bombay
- Website: www.bio.iitb.ac.in/people/faculty/srivastava-r/

Rohit Srivastava (born 1976) is a Himanshu Patel Chair Professor in the Department of Biosciences and Bioegineering at IIT Bombay specialising in medical diagnostic devices, nanoengineered materials and photothermal cancer therapy. He was awarded the Shanti Swarup Bhatnagar Prize for Science and Technology in Medical Sciences in the year 2021 for his contributions to the development of affordable medical devices.

Rohit Srivastava heads the NanoBios Lab in the Department of Biosciences and Bioengineering in IIT Bombay. The lab has developed and commercialised several products including UChek which is a mobile based portable urine analysis system, a low-cost reader for analyzing urine dip sticks, and Suchek which is an indigenous, low-cost glucometer. He along with his collaborators has as many as 90 granted Indian and three US patents to their credit with more than 250 patent applications filed over 19 years at IIT Bombay.

Srivastava was honoured with the Vigyan Shri award, one of four prestigious categories, for making significant advancements in medical diagnostic devices, nanoengineered materials, and photothermal cancer therapy in 2024, as a professor of the Department of Biosciences and Bioengineering at IIT-Bombay.

Expressing delight at the honour by the government, Srivastava said: “This is a testimony to the hard work done by our translational science lab.” He also thanked the institute for providing an ecosystem which, he said, is unparalleled in the country, as it allowed him to file more than 250 patents and set up more than 10 startups with over 50 PhD students.

“This is a proud moment for not just me but the entire IIT-B for getting the first ever Vigyan Shri in Innovation and Technology. I believe that our work in affordable medical devices and maternal and childcare will hold extreme promise for the future,” he added. Srivastava went to St Xaviers and DAV Model schools in Durgapur before moving to VNIT Nagpur to earn a degree in biomedical engineering. He then moved to the US to complete his MS and PhD. On his return to India in 2005, he joined IIT-B as a professor and setup a lab. Srivastava eventually moved into translational biomedical engineering, observing a need in India for indigenous medical products. “This was a decision that led to our lab commercialising several medical products and setting up many startups,” he said.

== Education ==
Rohit Srivastava received his PhD degree in biomedical engineering from Louisiana Tech University, US, under the supervision of Michael J. McShane in 2005, MS in engineering from the same university and BE degree in electronics engineering from Visvesvaraya Regional College of Engineering, Nagpur in 1999.

== Honours and recognitions ==
Rohit Srivastava has been conferred several awards including the following:

- Vigyan Shri Award under Rashtriya Vigyan Puraskar scheme (2024)
- Asian Scientist 100, Asian Scientist 2022
- Dr Shanti Swarup Bhatnagar Prize for Medical Sciences 2021
- Prof H H Mathur Award for Excellence in Translational Sciences at IIT Bombay
- Himanshu Patel Chair Professor at IIT Bombay
- Indian National Academy of Engineering (INAE) – Abdul Kalam Technology Innovation National Fellowship 2019
- National Academy of Sciences, India (NASI) – Elected Fellow 2019
- Royal Society of Biology – Elected Fellow 2019
- Royal Society of Chemistry – Elected Fellow 2019
- Shri Om Prakash Bhasin Award for Excellence in Health and Medical Sciences, 2018
- Department of Biotechnology (DBT) National Bioscience Award 2016
- Stars in Global Health, Grand Challenges Canada (GCC), Canada
- Stanford MedTech Award 2016
- DBT Biotech Product and Process Development and Commercialization Award 2015
- Vasvik Award – Award in the area of Biological Sciences and Technology 2013
- Organisation of Pharmaceutical Producers of India (OPPI) Award – Young Scientist Award 2014
