= Rahul Mukerjee =

Indian academic and statistician (born 1956)

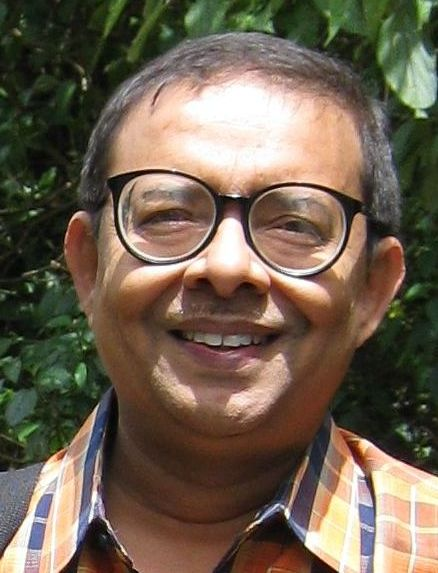
- Rahul Mukerjee
- Born: 9 February 1956 (age 70); Kolkata, West Bengal, India
- Citizenship: India
- Awards: Shanti Swarup Bhatnagar Award (2000) J.C. Bose National Fellowship (2010–15, 2015-20) Mahalanobis International Award (2017) P.V. Sukhatme National Award in Statistics (2018) National Science Chair (2021-26) Rashtriya Vigyan Puraskar – Vigyan Shri (National Science Award, 2024)
- Scientific career
- Fields: Statistics
- Workplaces: IIM Calcutta

Rahul Mukerjee is an Indian academic and statistician. He is a National Science Chair of the Government of India, hosted by the Indian Institute of Management Calcutta, after his superannuation from the same institute in 2021 as a professor in the higher academic grade. He is also an emeritus scientist of the Indian National Science Academy, New Delhi.

== Biography ==
Mukerjee completed his BSc (Hons) and MSc degrees in Statistics at the University of Calcutta, with rank first in the first class in each case. He received his PhD in Statistics in 1982 from the University of Calcutta.

== Career ==
After completing his university education, Mukerjee taught briefly at University of Calcutta and then at the Indian Statistical Institute, where he was awarded an out-of-turn promotion to full professorship at the age of thirty three. He joined IIM Calcutta as a full professor in 1989. He has also held short- or long-term visiting positions in many institutions around the world, including Harvard University, Mathematical Sciences Research Institute, Berkeley, Rutgers University, University of Michigan, Pennsylvania State University, Georgia Institute of Technology, University of Georgia, University of Florida, University of Toronto, University of Waterloo, Simon Fraser University, Memorial University of Newfoundland, Hiroshima University, University of Hong Kong, Academia Sinica, Taipei, Nankai University, Seoul National University, National University of Singapore, University of Malaya, Kuwait University and University of São Paulo.

Mukerjee has been on the editorial boards of such major international journals as The Annals of Statistics, Biometrika, Journal of the Royal Statistical Society Series B, and Statistica Sinica.

== Achievements ==
- Recipient, Indian Science Congress Association Young Scientists' Award, 1985.
- Honored Fellow, Institute of Mathematical Statistics, USA, 1999.
- Recipient, Shanti Swarup Bhatnagar Award, in mathematical sciences, 2000; highest award in science from Government of India for scientists below the age of 45 years.
- Recipient, National Award in Statistics in honour of C.R. Rao, 2001, Government of India.
- Fellow, Indian Academy of Sciences, 2001.
- Fellow, Indian National Science Academy, 2003.
- Fellow, National Academy of Sciences, India, 2003.
- Recipient, J.C. Bose National Fellowship, 2010–15 and 2015–20, Government of India.
- Platinum Jubilee Speaker, 2012, Indian Science Congress Association.
- Member, National Statistical Commission, 2013–16, Government of India.
- Independent Director (2017–20), Gas Authority of India Limited (GAIL), a Maharatna (highest level) company of Government of India.
- Recipient, Mahalanobis International Award, 2017 International Statistical Institute.
- Recipient, P.V. Sukhatme National Award in Statistics, 2018, Government of India.
- National Science Chair, 2021–26, Government of India.
- Recipient, Rashtriya Vigyan Puraskar – Vigyan Shri, 2024 (National Science Award); from the Government of India and presented by the President of India.

== Selected bibliography ==
Rahul Mukerjee has authored or co-authored 5 books and over 240 papers.

- "Randomized Response: Theory and Techniques" (1988, with A. Chaudhuri), Marcel Dekker.
- "A Calculus for Factorial Arrangements" (1989, with S. Gupta), Springer-Verlag.
- "Fractional Factorial Plans" (1999, with A. Dey), John Wiley & Sons.
- "Probability Matching Priors: Higher Order Asymptotics" (2004, with G.S. Datta), Springer-Verlag.
- "A Modern Theory of Factorial Design" (2006, with C.F. Jeff Wu), Springer-Verlag.
