= Muthusamy Lakshmanan =

Indian theoretical physicist (born 1946)

- Born: 25 March 1946 (age 80); Pollachi, Coimbatore district, Madras Presidency, British India
- Education: NGM College, Pollachi; Madras Christian College; University of Madras; University of Tübingen; Eindhoven University of Technology
- Known for: Studies on theory of nonlinear dynamics and Murali—Lakshmanan-Chua (MLC) Circuit
- Awards: 1980 UGC Young Scientists Award; 1980 UoM Raman Research Prize; 1984 GoTN Best University Teacher Award; 1989 Shanti Swarup Bhatnagar Prize; 1990 UGC Hari Om Trust Meghnad Saha Award; 1994 Tamil Nadu Scientists Award; 2004 Indian Science Congress Distinguished Scientist Award; 2005 Goyal Prize; 2014 R. D. Birla Award; 2024, 'Rashtriya Vigyan Puraskar – Vigyan Shri' in Physics Government of India
- Scientific career
- Fields: Theoretical physics
- Workplaces: University of Madras; Bharathidasan University; S.N. Bose National Centre for Basic Sciences; University of Manchester; Kyoto University; Uppsala University
- Doctoral advisor: P. M. Mathews

Muthusamy Lakshmanan (born 25 March 1946) is an Indian theoretical physicist currently working as Professor of Eminence at the Department of Nonlinear Dynamics of Bharathidasan University. Presently he is the DST-SERB National Science Chair awarded by the Science and Engineering Research Board, Department of Science and Technology. He has held several research fellowships which included Raja Ramanna fellowship of the Department of Atomic Energy, Alexander von Humboldt fellowship, Japan Society for the Promotion of Science fellowship, Royal Society Nuffield Foundation fellowship, and NASI-Senior Scientist Platinum Jubilee Fellowship. On 15 August 2021, he was conferred with the Dr. A. P. J Abdul Kalam Award by the Government of Tamil Nadu.

Known for his research on nonlinear dynamics and for the development of Murali-Lakshmanan-Chua (MLC) Circuit, Lakshmanan is an elected fellow of all three major Indian science academies – Indian Academy of Sciences, Indian National Science Academy and National Academy of Sciences, India – as well as of The World Academy of Sciences. The Council of Scientific and Industrial Research, the apex agency of the Government of India for scientific research, awarded him the Shanti Swarup Bhatnagar Prize for Science and Technology, one of the highest Indian science awards, for his contributions to physical sciences in 1989. (Note: Long link – please select award year to see details)

== Biography ==
Muthusamy Lakshmanan was born on 25 March 1946 in Pollachi, in the Coimbatore district of the south Indian state of Tamil Nadu. He graduated in science from NGM College in Pollachi in 1966 and earned his master's degree in physics (MSc) at Madras Christian College of the University of Madras in 1969. His post-MSc studies in theoretical physics were also at the University of Madras, completed with a first rank in 1970. He joined the university as a research assistant the same year. Simultaneously, he pursued his doctoral studies, supervised by P. M. Mathews, to secure a PhD in nonlinear dynamics in 1974.

Taking a sabbatical from university service, he did his post-doctoral studies first at the University of Tübingen as an Alexander von Humboldt fellow during 1976–77, and then at the Eindhoven University of Technology from 1977 to 1978. On his return to India, he rejoined University of Madras at their Post-Graduate Centre at Tiruchirapalli as a reader of physics, and held this post until 1982 when he moved to the physics department of Bharathidasan University as a reader. He was promoted as a professor in 1984, after which he headed the department of physics (1994–2006) as well as the Centre for Nonlinear Dynamics (CNLD) (1992–2006). In between, he served as an honorary professor at S.N. Bose National Centre for Basic Sciences from 1989 to 1994.

During his university service, Lakshmanan had several stints abroad: at the Institute of Science and Technology of the University of Manchester during 1979–80 as Royal Society Nuffield Foundation fellow, as a guest scientist at Uppsala University in 1981, and as a Japan Society for the Promotion of Science fellow at Kyoto University from 1984 to 1985. He also filled short-term assignments at institutions such as the International Centre for Theoretical Physics (1975 and 1986), Utrecht University (1975), Indian Institute of Science (1976), NATO Advanced Study Institute (1980), University of Melbourne (1980), University of Adelaide (1980), Indian Institute of Technology Madras (1982), Pondicherry University (1988), Centro di cultura scientifica Alessandro Volta (1988), Fudan University (1989), Russian Academy of Sciences (1990), Polish Academy of Sciences (as an INSA exchange fellow – 1991), Royal Society (as an INSA exchange visitor – 1996), University of Turku (1997), and Royal Netherlands Academy of Arts and Sciences (as an INSA exchange visitor – 1996). He superannuated from service in 2006. Post-retirement, he was nominated as a professor of eminence by Bharathidasan University and continued his association with the university as a Raja Ramanna fellow of the Board of Research in Nuclear Sciences (BRNS) of the Department of Atomic Energy (DAE) during 2006–07. After the expiry of the tenure of the fellowship, the Department of Science and Technology selected him as a Ramanna fellow in 2007. In 2011, DAE offered him the Raja Ramanna fellowship for a second term and he continued his research at the university.

== Legacy ==
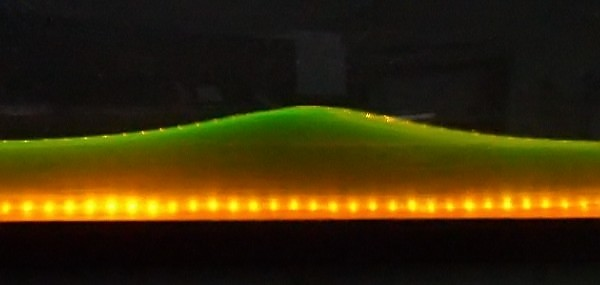
Soliton

A double rod pendulum animation showing chaotic behavior

Lakshmanan has done extensive research in the field of nonlinear dynamics, especially on solitons and chaos theory. One of the first Indian theoretical physicists to use differential geometrical methods such as Painlevé transcendents and Lie theory for studying the integrability of chaotic systems, he demonstrated unsuspected transformations and proposed variables for exposing hidden nonlinear structures. Collaborating with K. Murali and Leon O. Chua, he developed a non-autonomous chaotic circuit, Murali—Lakshmanan-Chua (MLC) Circuit which they detailed in an article, Controlling and Synchronization of Chaos in the Simplest Dissipative Non-autonomous Circuit, published in International Journal of Bifurcation and Chaos in 1995. He studied Heisenberg spin chains with respect to its solitons and elucidated the collision of optical solitons in multimode fibres and demonstrated the energy sharing between them. The body of his work has assisted in the development of applications based on ferromagnetism and nonlinear optics. His studies have been documented by way of a number of articles (Note: Please see Selected bibliography section) and the online article repository of Indian Academy of Sciences has listed 256 of them. Besides, he has published nine books which include "Nonlinear Dynamics: Integrability, Chaos and Patterns", "Chaos in Nonlinear Oscillators: Controlling and Synchronization", "Symmetries and singularity structures", "Dynamics of Nonlinear Time-Delay Systems" and "Nonlinear Evolution Equations: Integrability and Spectral Methods". His work has drawn citations from other scientists and he has mentored over 25 doctoral and many master's scholars, which has helped develop a school of research on nonlinear dynamics.

Lakshmanan founded the Centre for Nonlinear Dynamics of Bharathidasan University and served as the head of the centre for almost a decade and half from 1992 to 2006. He is a member of the editorial board of International Journal of Bifurcation and Chaos and has been associated with many other journals such as Advances in Mathematical Physics, Physics News, Journal of Nonlinear Mathematical Physics, Indian Journal of Physics and Proceedings of the Royal Society of London A. He also served as the guest editor-in-chief of Chaos, Solitons and Fractals when they published a special issue on solitons in 1995. He has been involved in the organization of the international conferences, workshops and winter schools and is a member of the organizing committee of the 3rd International Conference on Symmetries, Differential Equations and Applications (SDEA-III) scheduled to be held at Istanbul Technical University in August 2017. He delivered the keynote address as the chief guest at the workshop on Nonlinear Dynamics and its Applications organized by Indian Academy of Sciences and Bharathidasan University in 2003 and was the session chair of the Physics and Applied Mathematics Researchers' Meet (PAAMRM-2015) held at Indian Statistical Institute in March 2015. He was also an invited speaker at the Society for Industrial and Applied Mathematics conference on Nonlinear Waves and Coherent Structures (NW08) in July 2008, at the international conference on Nonlinear Evolution Equations and Dynamical Systems-2009 in Italy in May 2009, at the Robin Bullough Memorial Meeting of the University of Manchester in June 2009, at the Symmetry plus Integrability conference in Texas in June 2011, at Physcon-2011 in Spain in September 2011 and at the international conference on Frontiers in Mathematics at Guwahati University in March, 2015. When the National Academy of Sciences, India organized a national symposium on "New Materials" in 1987, he was among the organizers of the event and he served in the councils of the other two major Indian science academies, at Indian National Science Academy during 2005–07 and at Indian Academy of Sciences from 2010 to 2012; He also was on the National Board for Higher Mathematics from 1989 to 1992.

== Awards and honors ==
Lakshmanan received two early career awards in 1980, viz. the Young Scientists Award of the University Grants Commission of India and the Raman Research Prize of the University of Madras. Four years later, he received the Best University Teacher Award of the Government of Tamil Nadu. The Council of Scientific and Industrial Research awarded him the Shanti Swarup Bhatnagar Prize, one of the highest Indian science awards in 1989. The UGC honored him again in 1990 with the Hari Om Trust Meghnad Saha Award and he received the Tamil Nadu Scientists Award in 1994, followed by Hari Om Ashram Prerit Shri Hari Vallabhdas Chunilal Shah Research Endowment Prize in 1996. He was selected as a Distinguished Scientist by the Indian Science Congress Association in 2004 and Kurukshetra University awarded him the Goyal Prize in Physics the next year. He received the R. D. Birla Award Award of the Indian Physics Association in 2014.

Lakshmanan has received seven major research or academic fellowships and five elected fellowships during his career. He has received two research fellowships in the name of Raja Ramanna, from the Department of Atomic Energy and the Department of Science and Technology respectively. The other research fellowships were Alexander von Humboldt fellowship (1976–77), Royal Society Nuffield Foundation fellowship (1979–80), Japan Society for the Promotion of Science fellowship (1984–85), International Centre for Theoretical Physics Senior Associate Fellowship (2002–8) and the NASI-Senior Scientist Platinum Jubilee Fellowship (2016–). The National Academy of Sciences, India elected him as a fellow in 1989 and he became a fellow of the Indian Academy of Sciences and the Indian National Science Academy in 1991 and 1992 respectively. In 2009, The World Academy of Sciences elected him as a fellow. The year 2009 brought him another honor by way of honoris causa degree of Doctor of Science from University of Burdwan. The award orations delivered by him include Prof. G. Sankaranarayanan Endowment lecture (1991) and Dr. V. Shanmuga Sundaram Endowment lecture (2005) of Annamalai University, Dr. Biren Roy Memorial lecture (1998) and Professor Vishnu Vasudeva Narlikar Memorial lecture (2006) of Indian National Science Academy, Professor M. M. Thomas Endowment Lectures of Bishop Moore College (2001) and Prof. A. C. Banerji Memorial lecture of National Academy of Sciences, India (2007). An article was published in Chaos Solitons and Fractals in 1998 in honor of Lakshmanan on the occasion of his 50th birthday, written by K. Porsezian, one of his co-authors. Lakshmanan has been selected for the prestigious fellowship of the National Science Chairs instituted by Department of Science and Technology-Science and Engineering Research Board (SERB) for 2021.

- 'Rashtriya Vigyan Puraskar – Vigyan Shri' in Physics, Government of India for the year 2024

== Selected bibliography ==
=== Books ===
- A. Degasperis; Allan P. Fordy; Muthusamy Lakshmanan (1990). Nonlinear Evolution Equations: Integrability and Spectral Methods. Manchester University Press. ISBN 978-0-7190-3273-8.
- Muthusamy Lakshmanan; Muthiah Daniel (1990). Symmetries and singularity structures: integrability and chaos in nonlinear dynamical systems: proceedings of the workshop, Bharatidasan University, Tiruchirapalli, India, November 29 – December 2, 1989. Springer-Verlag. ISBN 978-0-387-53092-5.
- Muthusamy Lakshmanan (1996). Chaos in Nonlinear Oscillators: Controlling and Synchronization. World Scientific. ISBN 978-981-02-2143-0.
- Muthusamy Lakshmanan; Shanmuganathan Rajaseekar (6 December 2012). Nonlinear Dynamics: Integrability, Chaos and Patterns. Springer Science & Business Media. ISBN 978-3-642-55688-3.

=== Articles ===
- K. Murali M. Lakshmanan, L.O. Chua (1995). "Controlling and Synchronization of Chaos in the Simplest Dissipative Non-autonomous Circuit". International Journal of Bifurcation and Chaos. 5 (2): 563–571. Bibcode:1995IJBC....5..563M. doi:10.1142/S0218127495000466.
- Gopal Muniraja, M. Lakshmanan (2009). "Motion of space curves in three dimensional Minkowski space R^{3}_{1}, SO(2,1) spin equation and defocusing nonlinear Schrödinger equation". International Journal of Geometric Methods in Modern Physics. 7 (6): 10431–049. arXiv:1004.3856. Bibcode:2010IJGMM..07.1043M. doi:10.1142/S0219887810004701. S2CID 117045341.
- R. Radhakrishnan, M. Lakshmanan, J. Hietarinta (1997). "Inelastic Collision and Switching of Coupled Bright Solitons in Optical Fibers". Physical Review E. 56 (2): 2213. arXiv:solv-int/9703008. Bibcode:1997PhRvE..56.2213R. doi:10.1103/PhysRevE.56.2213. S2CID 14240733.
- T. Kanna, M. Lakshmanan (2001). "Exact soliton solutions, shape changing collisions, and partially coherent solitons in coupled nonlinear Schrödinger equations". Physical Review Letters. 86 (22): 5043–5046. arXiv:nlin/0103008. Bibcode:2001PhRvL..86.5043K. doi:10.1103/PhysRevLett.86.5043. PMID 11384416. S2CID 37042024.
- T. Kanna, M. Vijayajayanthi, M. Lakshmanan (2010). "Coherently coupled bright optical solitons and their collisions". Journal of Physics A: Mathematical and Theoretical. 43 (43). arXiv:1006.3395. Bibcode:2010JPhA...43Q4018K. doi:10.1088/1751-8113/43/43/434018. S2CID 53655038.
- S. Stalin, R. Ramakrishnan, M. Senthilvelan, M. Lakshmanan (2019). "Nondegenerate solitons in Manakov system". Physical Review Letters. xxx (x) 043901. arXiv:1810.01331. Bibcode:2019PhRvL.122d3901S. doi:10.1103/PhysRevLett.122.043901. PMID 30768290. S2CID 73455130.
- A. Ishaq Ahamed, K. Srinivasan, K. Murali, M. Lakshmanan (2011). "Observation of chaotic beats in a driven memristive Chua's circuit". International Journal of Bifurcation and Chaos in Applied Sciences and Engineering. 21 (3): 737–757. arXiv:1008.4681. Bibcode:2011IJBC...21..737I. doi:10.1142/S0218127411028763. S2CID 16517008.
- K. Srinivasan, I. Raja Mohamed, K. Murali, M. Lakshmanan, Sudeshna Sinha (2011). "Design of time delayed chaotic circuit with threshold controller". International Journal of Bifurcation and Chaos in Applied Sciences and Engineering. 21 (3): 725–735. arXiv:1008.4011. Bibcode:2011IJBC...21..725S. doi:10.1142/S0218127411028751. S2CID 14365363.

== See also ==
- Schrödinger equation
- Minkowski space
- Soliton (optics)
- Lyapunov stability
