= CMS College Kottayam =

Educational institute in Kerala

Coordinates: 9.5968466°N 76.5184534°E

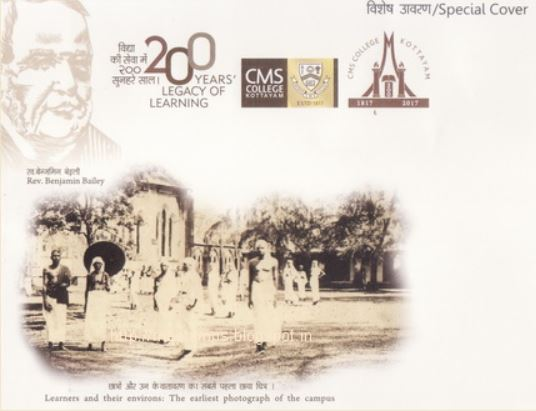
- Special Envelope released by India Post on the bicentenary (2016-02-26) of C.M.S College
- Motto: Thy Word Is Truth
- Established: 1815; 211 years ago
- Affiliations: Madhya Kerala Diocese of the Church of South India
- Academic affiliations: Mahatma Gandhi University, Kottayam
- Principal: Dr. Anju Sosan George
- Location: Kottayam
- Website: cmscollege.ac.in

The CMS College (Church Missionary Society College), established in 1817, is one of the earliest Western-style colleges in India. The college is considered to be the oldest institution of higher education in India along with the Presidency College Calcutta. This college is located at Kottayam, in the Kottayam district of Kerala. It offers undergraduate and postgraduate courses in arts, commerce, and sciences. It also offers different vocational degree courses. It is affiliated to the Mahatma Gandhi University, Kerala. It has been given Autonomous status by the University Grants Commission, India. CMS College, Kottayam and Presidency College Calcutta, established in the same year, are the two earliest western-style colleges of India. The college is ranked 92nd among colleges in India by the National Institutional Ranking Framework in 2024.

== History ==
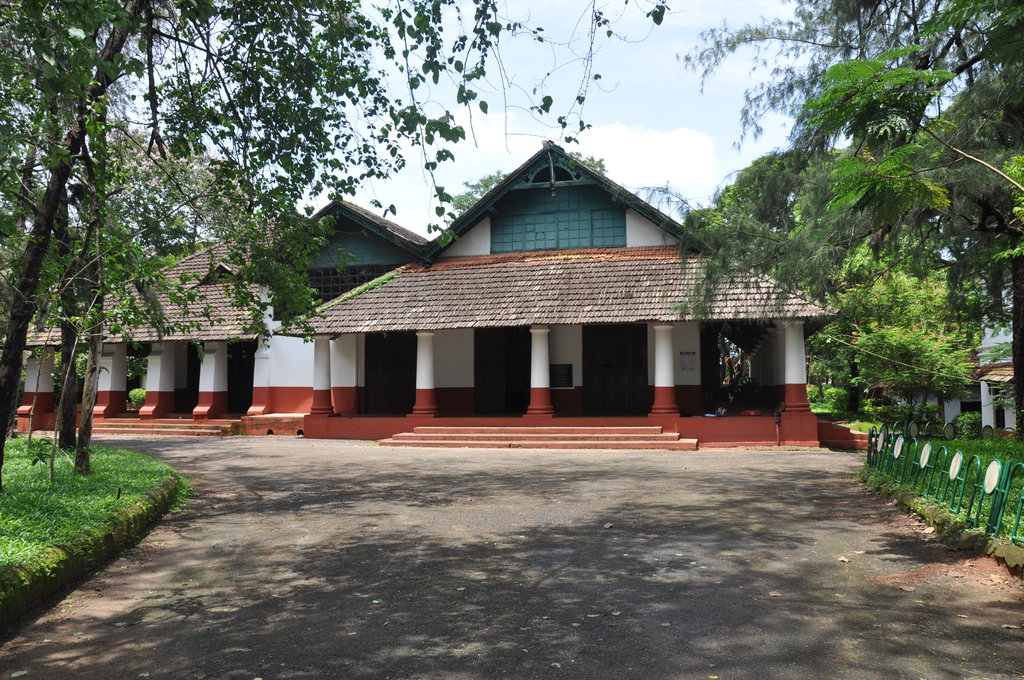
The Great Hall of CMS College

CMS College Kottayam is known for producing a wide range of alumni and is a landmark in the history of both Kottayam and Kerala. Founded by the Church Missionary Society of England, in 1817 when no institution existed in what was then the princely state of Travancore to teach English.

CMS College Kottayam was patronised by Col. John Munro, the East India Company Resident, and Dewan of Travancore. The Reverend Benjamin Bailey was the first principal. Apart from English, Greek and Latin were taught. The government of India welcomed the college as "a place of general education hence any demands of the state for officers to fill all the departments of public service would be met".

In the early years of the Old Seminary (Orthodox Pazhaya Seminary), the curriculum included the study of Latin, Greek, Hebrew, Mathematics, History, and Geography besides English, Malayalam, Sanskrit, and Syriac. In 1838, the college moved to a wooded hillock — the present site — commanding views of the distant Western Ghats. One of the oldest buildings in the campus is Room 52, or the "Grammar School", as it was originally called. A college magazine in Malayalam was started in 1864 by Principal Richard Collins, after whom the college library is named.

In 1857 the college was affiliated to Madras University soon after its incorporation, and the college began to present students for the Matriculation examination. It provided free education to all its students until 1855 when the fee of one Rupee per month per student was collected. The number of students in 1870 was 129. In 1880, Visakham Thirunal, Maharaja of Travancore, observed on a visit to the college: "Long before the state undertook the humanizing task of educating the subjects, the Christian Missionaries had raised the beacon of knowledge in the land".

In 1840, the number of students in the college was 220. In 1890, two-year classes were started, and the first batch of students, initially all men, was presented for the F.A. Examination in 1892. Female students were not admitted to the college until 1938. In 1950, Degree classes were started, and by 1960 the number of students in the college had risen to 1,250. Postgraduate classes were started in 1959. The college is now affiliated to Mahatma Gandhi University, Kottayam. In 1981, the Synod of the Church of South India transferred the management of the college to the C. S I. Madhya Kerala Diocese.

The 2006 Malayalam film Classmates was filmed here and was dedicated to the 1946-48 batch.

== Managing Council ==
The CSI Madhya Kerala Diocese is in charge of CMS College Kottayam. The Managing Council is made up of thirteen individuals. All significant decisions relating to the college's governance are made by the Council, which convenes no fewer than four times annually.

== Departments and courses ==
The college offers different undergraduate and postgraduate courses and aims at imparting education to the undergraduates of lower- and middle-class people of Kottayam and its adjoining areas. The college now has 17 Undergraduate and 18 postgraduate departments. There are six research centres in the college. Research work leading to the degree of Doctor of Philosophy is conducted in the departments of Botany, Zoology, Mathematics, Physics, Chemistry, English, and Commerce.

=== Science ===
Science faculty consists of the departments of Chemistry, Physics, Mathematics, Statistics, Computer Application, Botany, Zoology, Biotechnology, Home Science, and Economics.

=== Arts and Commerce ===
Arts and Commerce faculty consists of departments of Malayalam, English, Hindi, History, Political Science, Philosophy, Physical Education, Travel-Tourism and Logistics Management, Sociology, and Commerce (Finance & Accounting).

== Accreditation ==
In 1999 the college was accredited by the National Assessment and Accreditation Council with five-star status. In 2004 the University Grants Commission accorded it the status of College with Potential for Excellence. In 2009, the CMS English department celebrated the Golden Jubilee of the introduction of a postgraduate programme.

== Notable alumni ==
- K. R. Narayanan, President of India
- K. T. Thomas, Judge of the Supreme Court of India
- K. P. S. Menon, first Indian Foreign Secretary after independence
- Paulose II, Malankara Metropolitan and Catholicos of the Malankara Church
- K. M. Panikkar, ambassador to China
- E. C. G Sudharshan, physicist
- Roxy Mathew Koll, climate scientist
- Jacob Chandy, neurosurgeon
- N. N. Pillai, actor, script writer, orator, stage actor
- Unni R., short story writer, novelist, screenplay writer
- K. M. Mathew, former chief editor of Malayala Manorama
- John Abraham, film director and writer
- G. Aravindan, film director and music director
- Oommen Chandy, Chief Minister of Kerala
- Kavalam Narayana Panikkar, poet, dramatist
- Kadammanitta Ramakrishnan, poet
- Prem Prakash, actor and producer
- Jayaraj, film director
- B. Unnikrishnan, filmmaker and writer
- Sooraj S. Kurup, music director
- Anupama Parameswaran, actress
- Kummanam Rajasekharan, BJP State President
- Suresh Kurup, MLA
- Joshy Mathew, film director
- Kanam Rajendran, politician
- Philip Augustine, gastroenterologist

== See also ==
- St. Berchmans College
- Scott Christian College
- Henry Baker College
- University College Thiruvananthapuram
