= Sendurai Mani =

Sendurai A. Mani
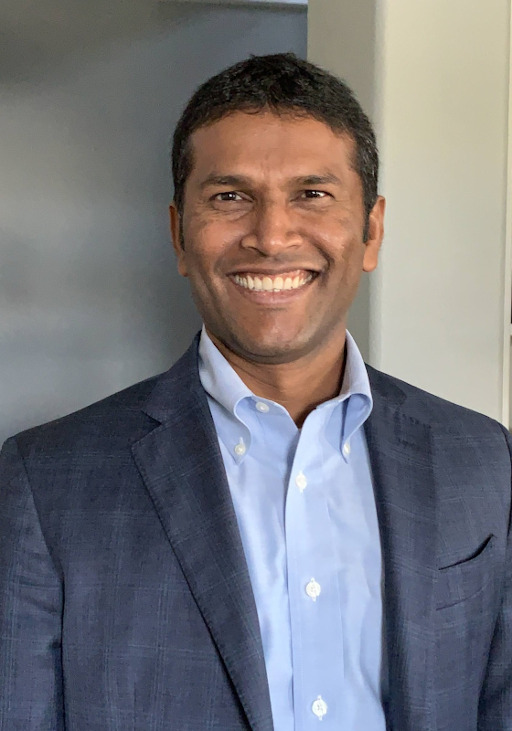
- Sendurai Mani in 2021
- Born: Sendurai, Tamil Nadu, India
- Education: Madurai Kamaraj University; Indian Institute of Science; Massachusetts Institute of Technology
- Known for: EMT; Cancer stem cells
- Awards: Fellow of The American Association for the Advancement of Science
- Scientific career
- Fields: Molecular Biology, Oncology, and Genetics
- Workplaces: Whitehead Institute; MD Anderson Cancer Center; Brown University
- Doctoral advisor: Govindarajan Padmanaban
- Other academic advisors: Robert A. Weinberg
- Website: mani.us

Sendurai A. Mani is an Indian-American cancer researcher and a Molecular Biologist. He is a fellow of the American Association for the Advancement of Sciences (AAAS), and Dean's Chair for Translational Oncology at the Warren Alpert Medical School of the Brown University, where he also serves as associate director for Translational Oncology at the Legorreta Cancer Center. In 2025, he re received an honorary Master of Arts (ad eundem) degree from Brown University. He previously served as co-director of Metastasis Research Center and co-director, the Center for Stem Cell & Developmental Biology, and as a professor of Translational Molecular Pathology at the University of Texas MD Anderson Cancer Center.

== Early life and education ==
Mani was born in a small town in the southern Indian state of Tamil Nadu. His parents never received a formal education, and are farmers. He completed his bachelor's and master's degrees at the Madurai Kamaraj University. Mani was then accepted with a scholarship at the Indian Institute of Science. There he earned a Ph.D. in Biochemistry and Molecular Biology under Professor Govindarajan Padmanabhan, a former director of the Indian Institute of Science. Mani was the first person from his hometown to earn a doctorate degree.

== Career and research ==
Mani then pursued postdoctoral work at the Whitehead Institute / Massachusetts Institute of Technology under the mentorship of Professor Robert Weinberg. As a postdoctoral fellow in the Weinberg lab Mani and his colleague Jing Yang demonstrated that the latent embryonic program known as the Epithelial-Mesenchymal Transition (EMT) is critical for the development of metastasis.

Mani joined the faculty of MD Anderson Cancer Center, Houston, Texas in 2007 and was promoted to Professor with Tenure. In 2022, Mani was appointed as an associate director for Translational Oncology at Legorreta Cancer Center, at Brown University and a professor of Pathology and Laboratory Medicine at Warren Alpert Medical School at Brown University, Providence, Rhode Island.

Mani's laboratory investigates how cancer cells develop to become metastatic. Mani was the first to demonstrate that cancer cells acquire stem cell properties by activating the EMT program, which allows them to survive better in the blood and establish a metastasis histopathologically similar to that of the parental primary tumor. In this highly influential article, Mani and colleagues identified various novel attributes of metastatic cancer cells and provided the foundation and an explanation for the presence of cellular plasticity within the tumor. Mani and his team continue to investigate ways to treat metastasis.

== Public engagement ==
Mani spoke at TEDx Providence in 2023 on the topic "Why do people get cancer, how it spreads, and how to prevent it? The talk has since reached over 1.8 million views for its accessible and insightful explanation of cancer biology. He later delivered a second TEDx talk titled "How to Transform Failures into Opportunities and Grow Luck," which explores resilience, mindset, and personal growth.

== Entrepreneuship ==
Mani co-founded SathGen Biotech, a subdivision of Godavari Biorefineries, with Mr. Samir Somaiya of Somaiya Group, Mumbai, India and he also co-founded Iylon Precision Oncology.

== Awards and honors ==
- V-Scholar Award from the V Foundation
- The American Cancer Society Research Scholar Award
- Elected member of the Scientific Research Honor Society Sigma Xi
- Elected fellow of the American Association for the Advancement of Sciences (AAAS)
- The MD Anderson Research Trust Fellow funded by The George and Barbara Bush Endowment for Innovative Cancer Research
