= Govindarajan Padmanaban =

Indian biochemist and biotechnologist (born 1938)

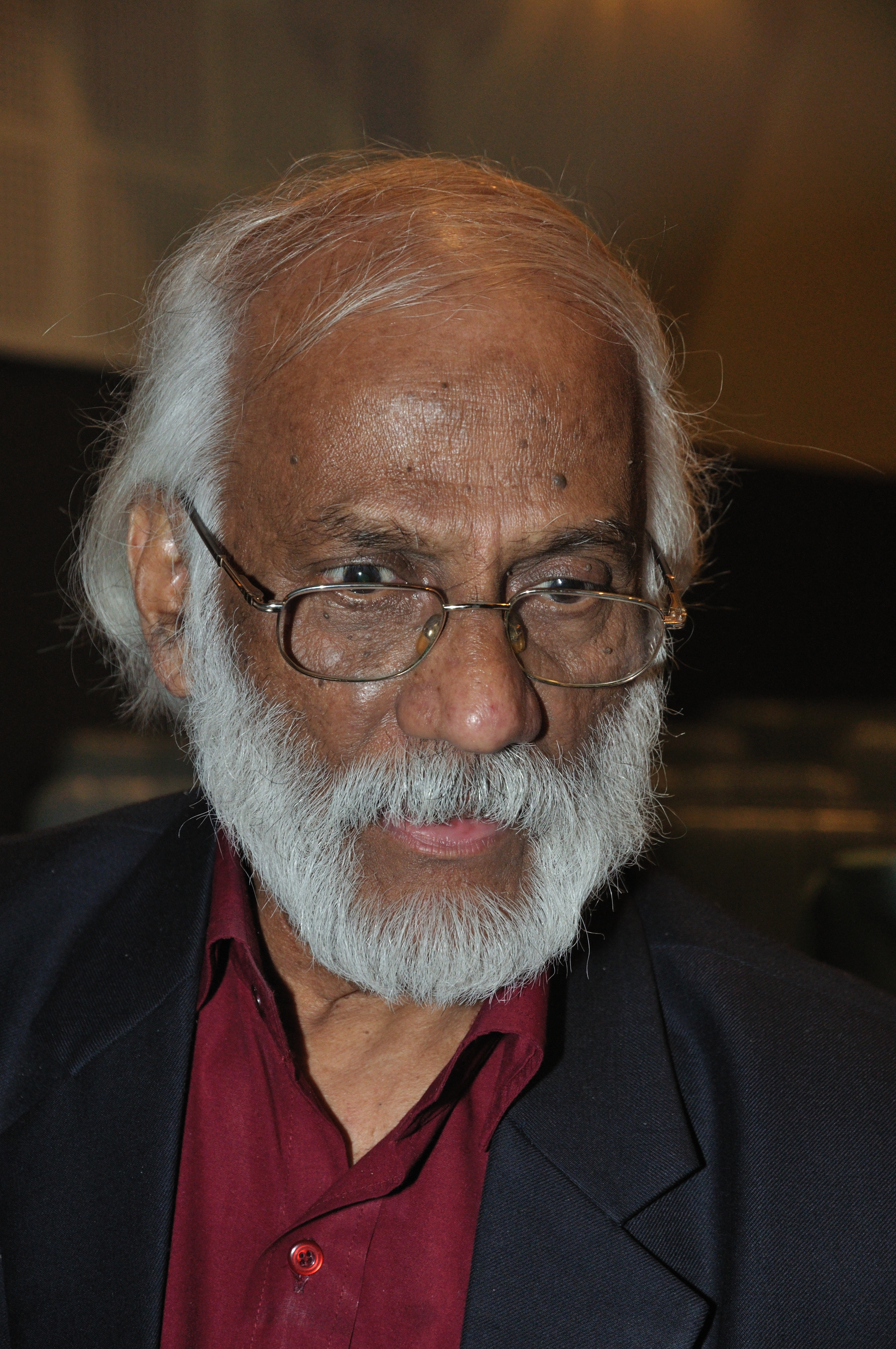
- Born: 20 March 1938 (age 88); Madras, India
- Education: University of Madras; Indian Institute of Science; Indian Agricultural Research Institute
- Known for: Molecular Parasitology
- Awards: Vigyan Ratna Award (2024); Padma Bhushan (2003); Padma Shri (1991); Shanti Swarup Bhatnagar Prize (1983)
- Scientific career
- Fields: Biochemistry
- Workplaces: Indian Institute of Science; St Mary's Hospital Medical School; University of Chicago
- Doctoral advisor: P. S. Sarma
- Doctoral students: P. N. Rangarajan; Sendurai Mani; M. R. S. Rao

Govindarajan Padmanaban (born 20 March 1938, in Madras) is an Indian biochemist and biotechnologist. He was the former director of the Indian Institute of Science (IISc) and currently serves as an honorary professor in the department of biochemistry at IISc and Chancellor of the Central University of Tamil Nadu.

== Early life and education ==
Padmanaban was brought up in a family of engineers. He belongs to the Tanjore district of Tamil Nadu but had settled in Bangalore. He received his bachelor's degree in chemistry from the University of Madras and master's degree in Soil Chemistry at the Indian Agricultural Research Institute, New Delhi and Ph.D. in biochemistry at the Indian Institute of Science (IISc), Bangalore in 1966.

== Research ==
In the early years of his research, he primarily worked in the transcriptional regulation of Eukaryotic genes in the liver. He was interested in elucidating the multifaceted role of heme in cellular processes. His group discovered the heme-biosynthetic pathway in the malarial parasite and showed it to be a drug target. He has also been interested in the area of vaccine development. His team was successful in showing the antimalarial property of Curcumin and its efficacy in combination therapy in 2004.

== Awards ==
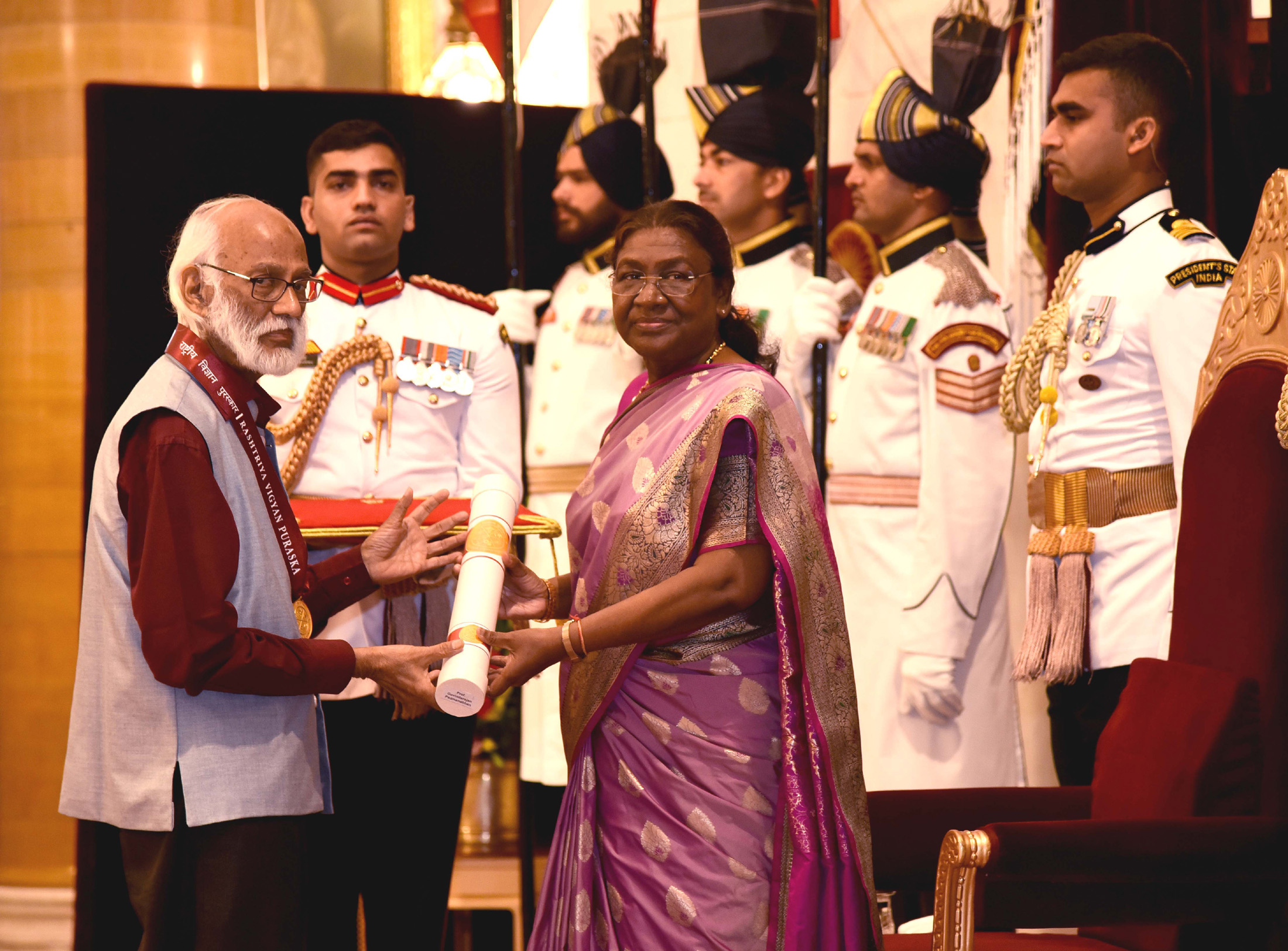
Padmanabhan receiving the Vigyan Ratna Award from President Droupadi Murmu in August 2024.

- Asian Scientist 100 (2025)
- Vigyan Ratna Award (2024)
- Shanti Swarup Bhatnagar Prize for Science and Technology (1983)
- Padma Shri (1991)
- Padma Bhushan (2003)
- Elected Fellowship of the National Academy of Medical Sciences

Academic offices
Preceded by C. N. R. Rao	Director, Indian Institute of Science; 1994–1998	Succeeded by Govardhan Mehta
