= Jayant B. Udgaonkar =

Indian biochemist, molecular biologist (born 1960)

- Jayanta Udgāṁvakara
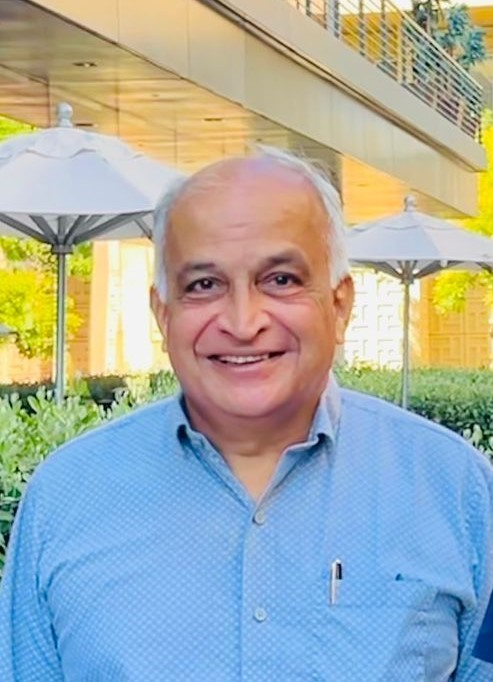
- Born: March 22, 1960 (age 66); Maharashtra
- Education: IIT Madras (MSc) Cornell University (PhD)
- Alma mater: St. Xavier's College, Mumbai (BSc)
- Organization(s): National Centre for Biological Sciences, IISER Pune
- Known for: Protein-folding
- Website: sites.google.com/acads.iiserpune.ac.in/prof-udgaonkar-lab

Jayant Bhalchandra Udgaonkar (Marathi: Jayanta Udgāṁvakara, pronounced [dʒəjənt̪ᵊ tʃən̪d̪ɾə ud̪əɡaʊ̃kəɾᵊ]) is a molecular biologist studying the processes by which a random chain of amino acids stabilises into a functional structure during or after translation.

== Early life and education ==
Born on 22 March 1960 to Bhalchandra Udgaonkar, a theoretical physicist, and Suhasini Udgaonkar, a renowned historian, Jayant Udgaonkar studied Chemistry at St. Xavier's College, Mumbai (BSc, 1979) and IIT Madras (MSc, 1981), and Biochemistry at Cornell University.

== Protein folding ==
While studying the kinetics of acetylcholine receptors in response to the binding of ACh at Stanford University, he was struck by the structural precision of protein molecules that enabled them to perform highly specialized tasks with extreme precision. Consequently, he focused his attention on the processes that make these structures possible, and what may go wrong in these highly accurate processes. In one of his earliest studies, he found that a certain hydrophobic collapse is the first stage in a typical protein folding process. His current work focuses on the formation of amyloids.

== Awards and honors ==
- Vigyan Shri Award under Rashtriya Vigyan Puraskar scheme (2024).
- Udgaonkar stood first in the BSc chemistry examinations of the University of Mumbai in 1979.

== Selected bibliography ==
- Jayant B Udgaonkar, Robert L Baldwin (November 1990). "Early folding intermediate of ribonuclease A." Proceedings of the National Academy of Sciences. 87 (21): 8197–8201. Bibcode:1990PNAS...87.8197U. doi:10.1073/pnas.87.21.8197. PMC 54922. PMID 2236032.
