= Raja Shivaji Vidyalaya =

This is about a school in Maharashtra, its history and contributions to the world

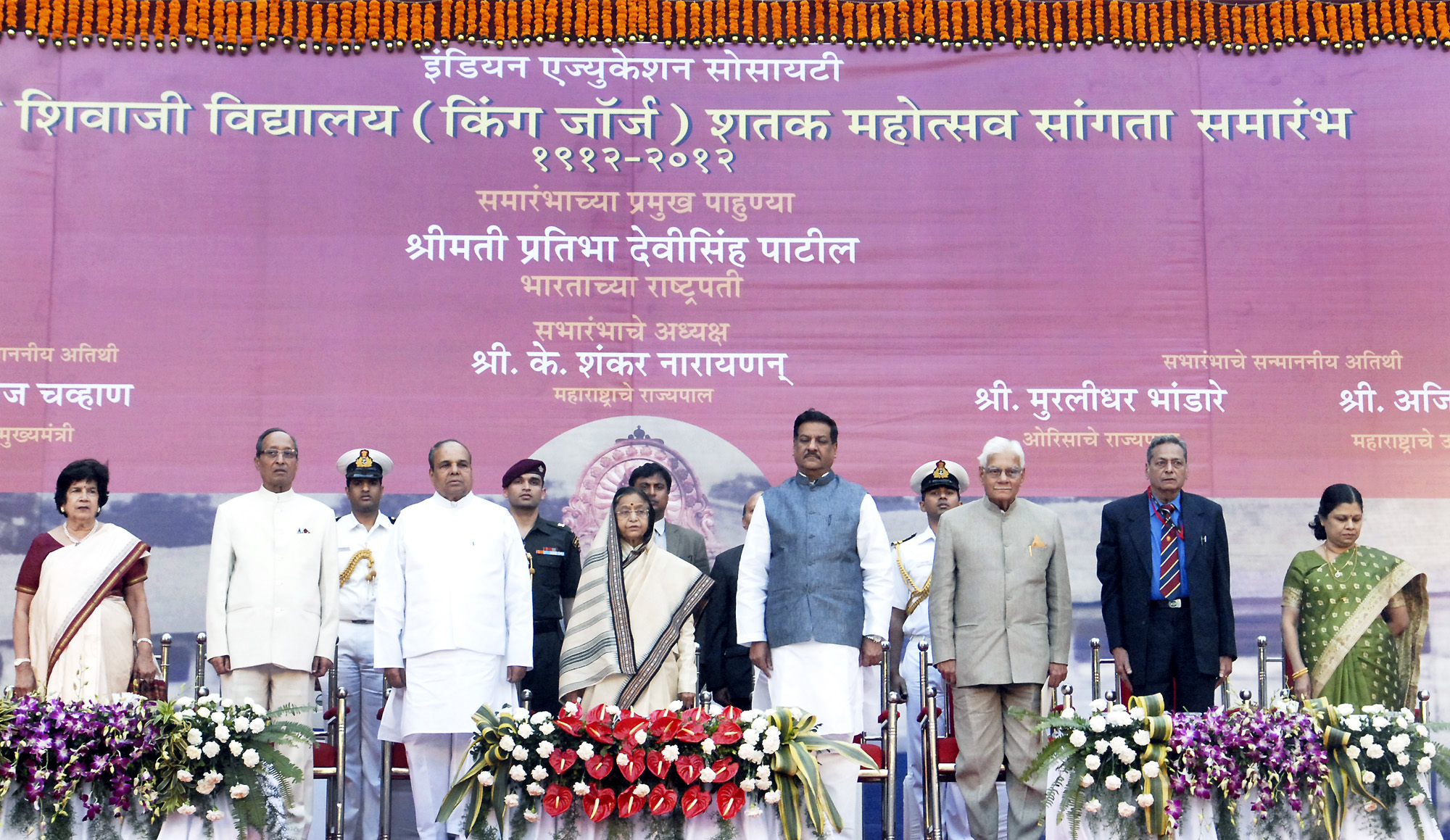
Pratibha Devisingh Patil at the IES’s Raja Shivaji Vidyalaya centenary celebration (1912-2012) function, in Mumbai

Raja Shivaji Vidyalaya is one of the three medium high schools (formerly known as King George High School), in the Dadar neighborhood of Mumbai, Maharastra, India. Raja Shivaji is a Marathi medium school and the Indian Education Society's aka IES English Medium is the larger part of the school. There is also a small Gujarati medium section in the premises. The school was founded in 1912, and named in honor King George V who had visited India in 1911. It was renamed in 1974, at which time it switched from an English language curriculum to a Marathi curriculum. It has since resumed English education, becoming a "semi-English" (mixed English/Marathi) institution. In 2012, former President of India, Pratibha Patil was the guest of honor at the school's centenary celebration.

Lt. Shri Akshikar founded Dadar English School before 1911. The teachers working there Lt. Shri Nagesh Mahadev Kale, Lt. Shri Krushnaji Mahadev Barve, Lt. Shri Deshmukh, Lt. Shri Koranne and Lt. Shri Aaras, who were highly motivated, came together and decided to start an Independent School. During the period of 1911 King George V from England visited India. He was known for his calm nature and was extremely inclined towards education. During his visit, he announced the slogan ‘Educate and Agitate’. He encouraged people to open schools for spreading awareness of literacy. At times he even extended his help for this noble cause. Inspired by his efforts these five Jewels got encouraged and started a school named ‘King George English School’ on 10 January 1912. It had started near Portuguese Church in premises of Padwal's Bungalow and in Kalgutkar's Chawl. They offered their full co-operation in progress of the school. In 1924 a plot was purchased by Lt. Shri Kale and Lt. Shri Khopkar in Hindu Colony. On 2 June 1974, the school was renamed as ‘Raja Shivaji Vidyalaya’. The school is regarded as one of the best schools in Mumbai city.

I.E.S RAJA SHIVAJI VIDYALAYA, RAJA SHIVAJI VIDYA SANKUL, HINDU COLONY, DADAR (EAST), MUMBAI - 400014. PH - 022-61379595

== Notable alumni ==
Notable alumni of the school include:

- Murlidhar Chandrakant Bhandare, former governor of Odisha
- Prashant Damle, actor
- Madhav Mantri, cricketer
- Dilip Vengsarkar, cricketer
- Bhargavi Chirmule, actor
- Bhalchandra Udgaonkar, Particle physicist and Padma Bhushan awardee
- Chetan Shashital, voice artist
- Renuka Shahane, actor
- Sanjay Manjrekar, cricketer
- Pallavi Joshi, actress
- Rajeshwari Sachdev, actress
- Urmila Matondkar, actress
- Vaidehi Parshurami, actress
- Hardeek Joshi, actor
- Tushar Dalvi, actor

== See also ==
- List of schools in Mumbai
