= Roxy Mathew Koll =

Indian climate scientist

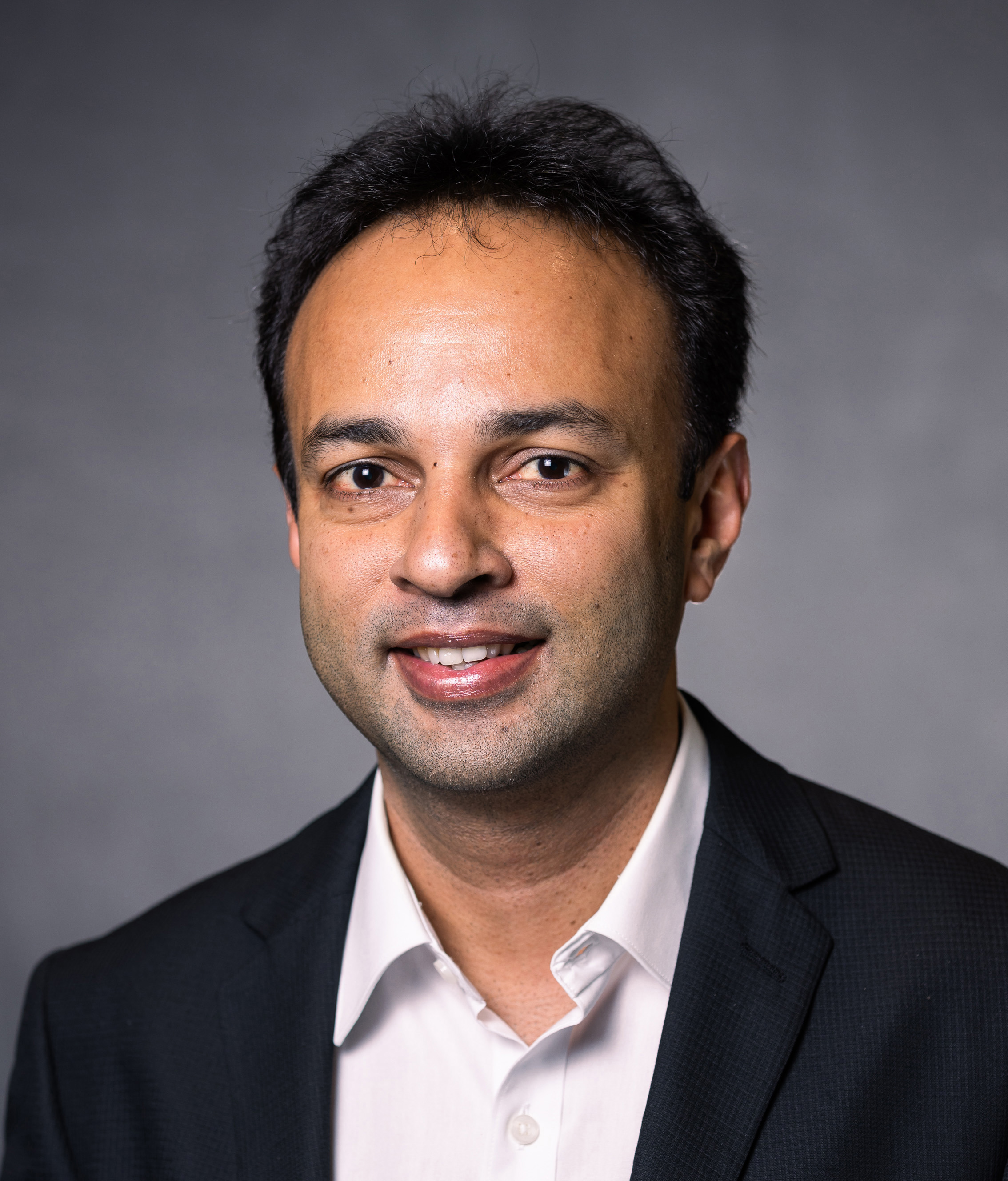
- Education: Hokkaido University; Cochin University of Science and Technology; CMS College Kottayam
- Known for: Studies on Indian Ocean warming, climate change, and monsoon dynamics
- Awards: 2024 Rashtriya Vigyan Puraskar; 2022 American Geophysical Union Devendra Lal Medal; 2017 Indian Institute of Tropical Meteorology Silver Jubilee Award; 2016 India Meteorological Society Young Scientist Award
- Scientific career
- Fields: Climate Science; Oceanography; Atmospheric Science
- Workplaces: Indian Institute of Tropical Meteorology; National Oceanic and Atmospheric Administration; Euro-Mediterranean Center on Climate Change; Hokkaido University; National Institute of Oceanography, India
- Website: https://www.climate.rocksea.org/

Roxy Mathew Koll is a climate scientist at the Indian Institute of Tropical Meteorology (IITM), Pune. His research focuses on climate change and extreme weather events in the Indo-Pacific region, including Indian Ocean warming, monsoon dynamics, heatwaves, tropical cyclones and their impacts on public health. He has served as a Lead Author for IPCC reports, including the Special Report on the Ocean and Cryosphere in a Changing Climate and is a Lead Author of the Seventh Assessment Report.

== Education ==
Koll completed a B.Sc. in physics from CMS College Kottayam, followed by an M.Sc. in physical oceanography from Cochin University of Science and Technology, India. He completed his Ph.D. in Ocean and Atmospheric Dynamics from Hokkaido University, Japan, in 2007.

== Career ==
Koll worked as a Research Scientist at the Euro-Mediterranean Center on Climate Change (CMCC) in Bologna, Italy, from 2008 to 2010. Since 2010, he has worked as a scientist at IITM, Pune, involved in projects related to ocean observations, climate modeling and earth system research. He also holds a concurrent position as a Professor at the Academy of Scientific and Innovative Research (AcSIR). He was a visiting scientist at the National Oceanic and Atmospheric Administration (NOAA), at the National Centers for Environmental Prediction (NCEP) in Maryland in 2012, and at the Pacific Marine Environmental Laboratory (PMEL) in Seattle from 2018 to 2019.

Koll has made contributions to understanding the rapid warming of the Indian Ocean, and how this warming is driving changes in the monsoon, the marine ecosystem, and increasing the frequency of extreme weather events across the region. In his science-to-policy writings, Koll has described climate change and extreme weather in the Indian Ocean as an early warning of changes that could affect oceans worldwide. His work has shown that the expansion of the Indo-Pacific Warm Pool is altering global rainfall patterns by modulating the Madden–Julian oscillation, which impacts weather systems across the tropics and beyond.

Koll has been involved in the United Nations World Climate Research Programme's CLIVAR Project. He was the co-chair of the CLIVAR Indian Ocean Region Panel during 2018 to 2023 and played a role in redesigning the Indian Ocean Observing System to better understand and forecast the weather and climate for the nations surrounding the Indian Ocean. He played a role in developing India's first Earth System Model and has been a lead author for the IPCC reports.

In their recent research, Koll and his team examined how climatic factors such as temperature, rainfall, humidity, and large-scale climate variability like the El Niño influence dengue transmission in Pune and Kerala, India. Using machine-learning models, the studies identified climate signals that provide more than two months of lead time for dengue prediction in Pune and about three months of potential predictability in Kerala.

== Awards ==
Koll received a National Academy of Sciences (NAS) Kavli Fellowship in 2015. In 2016 his research on the impact of climate change on the monsoon earned him the Indian Meteorological Society's Young Scientist Award. In 2018 he was awarded the National Research Council (NRC) Senior Research Associateship of the US National Academy of Sciences.

In December 2022 the American Geophysical Union (AGU) awarded him the AGU Devendra Lal Medal for scientists in developing countries in recognition of his research in Earth sciences and conferred him as an AGU Fellow.

In August 2024, Koll was one of 18 scientists awarded the Rashtriya Vigyan Puraskar, a national science award presented by the President of India, in recognition of his contributions to climate science.

Koll received the Prof. R. Ramesh Endowment Award, instituted by the Ocean Society of India to honor outstanding contributions in climate and ocean sciences. The award was presented by Goa's Chief Minister, Pramod Sawant, at the OSICON 25 conference held at the CSIR National Institute of Oceanography (NIO), Goa, on February 5, 2025.

In 2026, Koll was selected to receive the American Geophysical Union’s Pavel S. Molchanov Climate Communications Prize for climate science communication.

== Public engagement ==
Koll's research has influenced national climate policies and disaster management strategies, especially in the Indian Ocean region. He actively communicates climate science through various media outlets. He has written for major Indian newspapers and magazines including Times of India, Hindustan Times, The Hindu, Malayala Manorama, and Frontline. He has been quoted in and interviewed by international newspapers such as The New York Times, The Guardian, Le Monde, Der Freitag, and Reuters on climate change, ocean warming, monsoon variability, cyclones, and heatwaves. He is a regular guest at TV and radio discussions about global warming and extreme weather events over South Asia. The Science Journalists' Association of India recognized his contributions to science communication and referred to him as a "rockstar scientist."

Koll has advocated for the establishment of climate-equipped schools in India, proposing that all schools be outfitted with weather stations to serve as local climate hubs for education and real-time weather monitoring. This initiative aims to enhance disaster preparedness while fostering climate awareness among students and communities, contributing to local resilience in the face of extreme weather events. Koll was honored as a "Change Maker" at the Manorama News Conclave 2024, recognizing his impact on climate resilience and community engagement.

== Selected publications ==
- Roxy, M.K., et al. (2024). Chapter 20: Future projections for the tropical Indian Ocean. In Ummenhofer, C.C., & Hood, R.R. (Eds.), The Indian Ocean and its role in the global climate system. Elsevier, pp. 469–482. doi: 10.1016/B978-0-12-822698-8.00004-4
- Beal, L. M., J. Vialard, M. K. Roxy, et al. (2020). A roadmap to IndOOS-2: Better observations of the rapidly-warming Indian Ocean. Bulletin of the American Meteorological Society, 101 (11): E1891–E1913, doi: 10.1175/BAMS-D-19-0209.1
- Roxy, M.K., et al. (2019). Twofold expansion of the Indo-Pacific warm pool warps the MJO lifecycle. Nature, 575, 647–651. doi:10.1038/s41586-019-1764-4
- Collins M., M. Sutherland, M. K. Roxy, et al. (2019). IPCC Report: Extremes, Abrupt Changes and Managing Risks. IPCC Special Report on Oceans and Cryosphere in a Changing Climate, Cambridge University Press. doi: 10.1017/9781009157964.008
- Roxy, M.K., et al. (2017). A threefold rise in widespread extreme rain events over central India. Nature Communications, 8, 708. doi:10.1038/s41467-017-00744-9
- Roxy, M.K., et al. (2015). Drying of Indian subcontinent by rapid Indian Ocean warming and a weakening land-sea thermal gradient. Nature Communications, 6, 7423. doi:10.1038/ncomms8423
- Swapna, P., M. K. Roxy, et al. (2014). The IITM Earth System Model: Transformation of a Seasonal Prediction Model to a Long-Term Climate Model. Bulletin of the American Meteorological Society, 96, 1281-1287. doi:10.1175/BAMS-D-13-00276.1

== Personal life ==
Roxy Mathew Koll is married to Juby Aleyas Koll, a hand embroidery artist and author. Known professionally as "Sarah," she has authored several books on hand embroidery, including Hand Embroidery Stitches for Everyone, which covers over 300 stitch techniques.
