= C. Anandharamakrishnan =

Indian scientist and academician

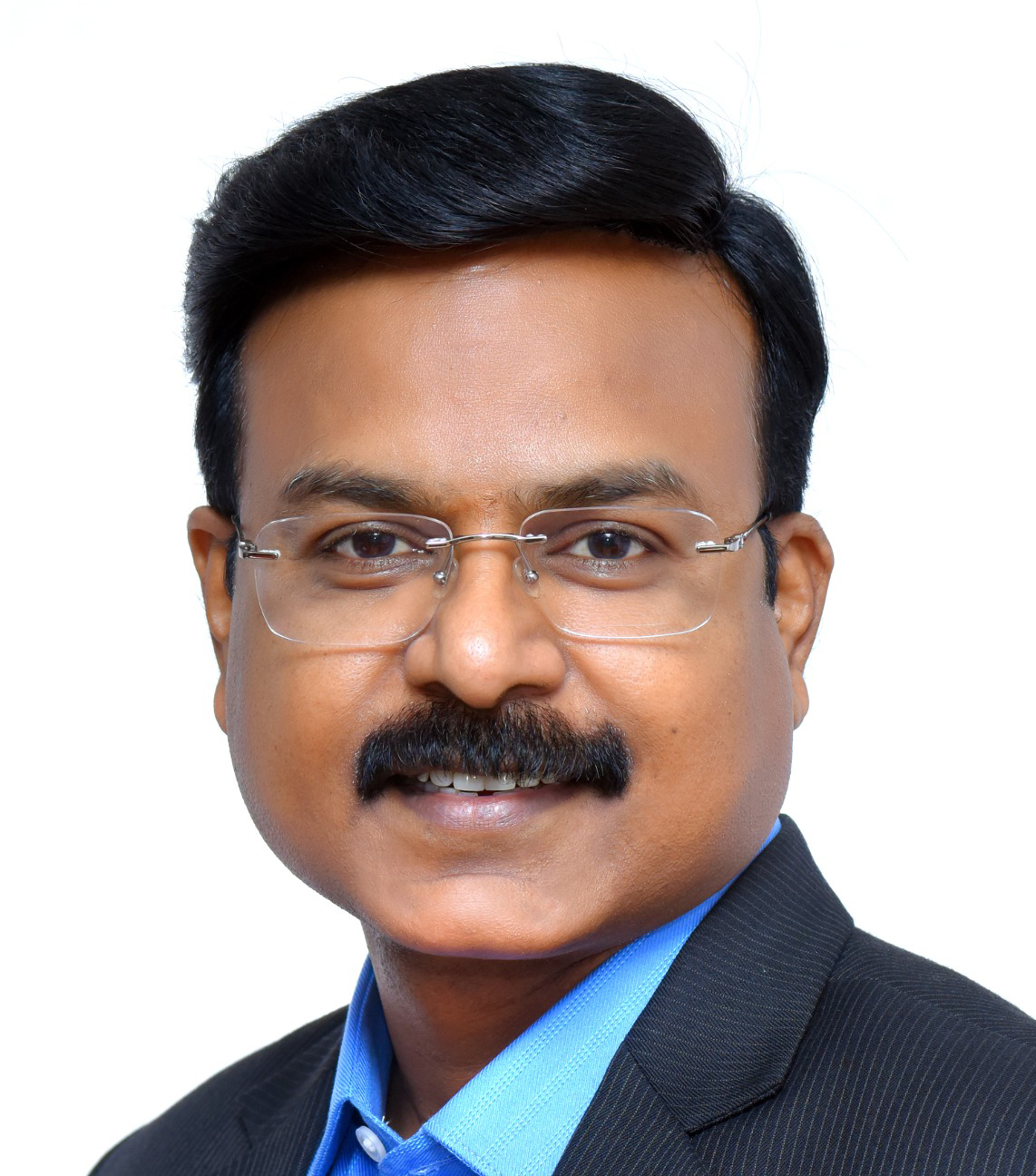
- Anandharamakrishnan in 2023
- Born: Coimbatore, India
- Education: Loughborough University, United Kingdom, Alagappa College of Technology, Anna University
- Occupations: Director, National Institute of Interdisciplinary Science and Technology, (NIIST), Thiruvananthapuram, Former Director (Additional Charge), CSIR- National Environmental Engineering Research Institute (NEERI), Nagpur, Former Director, National Institute of Food Technology, Entrepreneurship and Management (NIFTEM) Thanjavur (Formerly IIFPT), Senior principal scientist, CSIR-Central Food Technological Research Institute, Mysuru.
- Known for: Research in Food Engineering, Artificial Human digestive system for glycemic index studies, Food nanotechnology and 3D food printing
- Website: www.anandharamakrishnan.in

Anandharamakrishnan Chinnaswamy, commonly referred as Anandharamakrishnan is an Indian scientist and academician, having expertise in Chemical Engineering and Food processing. He is working as director of National Institute of Interdisciplinary Science and Technology, (NIIST) Thiruvananthapuram, Kerala. He also served as the Director of CSIR- National Environmental Engineering Research Institute (CSIR- NEERI), Nagpur, Maharashtra (31 December 2024 to 30 January 2025). Earlier, he served as director of National Institute of Food Technology, Entrepreneurship and Management, Thanjavur (NIFTEM-T) (Formerly known as Indian Institute of Food Processing Technology (IIFPT), Thanjavur, Tamil Nadu during the period April 2022 – November 2022 and as chief scientist at the CSIR - Central Food Technological Research Institute (CFTRI), Mysuru, Karnataka.

In the first edition of the Rashtriya Vigyan Puraskar, Dr. Anandharamakrishnan was honoured with the Vigyan Shri Award, one of four prestigious categories, in recognition of his significant contributions to the field of food and agricultural processing.

"The award would inspire me and my team in NIIST to make more meaningful contributions for the further advancement of science in India, and also for the benefit of society at large. We will strive to ensure that our research efforts have industrial relevance and are relevant for farmers and entrepreneurs as well," he said.

== Education and professional career ==
Anandharamakrishnan completed his bachelor's degree (BTech) in chemical engineering (1990–94) and master's degree (MTech) 1994-1996 batch from Alagappa College of Technology, Anna University, India. He got scholarship under Commonwealth Scholarship programme of United Kingdom for pursuing PhD in chemical engineering at Loughborough University, United Kingdom, for his work on 'Experimental and Computational Fluid Dynamics Studies on Spray freeze-drying and Spray-drying of Proteins'. He started his career as scientist at Central Food Technological Research Institute (CFTRI), Mysuru from the year 1999 and became principal scientist in the year 2010. He then joined as director, Indian Institute of Food Processing Technology, Thanjavur in the year 2016. During his tenure as director, IIFPT has attained Institute of National Importance status by The National Institutes of Food Technology, Entrepreneurship and Management (NIFTEM) Act 2021 and subsequently IIFPT is renamed as National Institute of Food Technology, Entrepreneurship and Management (NIFTEM)Thanjavur. From November 2022, he is serving as director of National Institute for Interdisciplinary Science and Technology (NIIST), Trivandrum. His research endeavors are well documented in peer reviewed reputed international scientific journals. He has 3 International patents, 7 Indian patents, authored 7 books, and edited 15 books. He is ranked among the top 2 percentile of the scientist working in food science and technology as per the career long data updated to end-of-2020 published by Elsevier BV and Stanford University

== Legacy ==
Dr. Anandharamakrishnan is known for his pioneering research works in the field of Food processing with special focus on Food Engineering, Food nanotechnology, Engineered human digestive systems and Food 3D printing. His works also spanned across inter-disciplinary fields such as food industry waste utilization, food processing equipment design, novel food matrix development for drug delivery and functional foods.

=== Engineered Human Stomach and Small Intestinal System ===
Dr. Anandharamakrishnan has developed engineered human stomach and small intestine dynamic digestive system called ARK^{®} to study the digestion and absorption behaviour of the foods in human stomach. This ARK^{®} system is designed to study the particle breakdown and digestive pattern of the cooked white rice in our alimentary canal. This ARK^{®} system simulates the physiological conditions of small intestine and records the level of absorption of micronutrients and nano-formulated bioactive compounds present in foods. This information is useful in the development of functional food and supplements. Recently, this ARK® system has been used to predict the glycemic response curve similar to that of in-vivo human blood glucose level.

=== 3D/4D Food Printing ===
Dr. Anandharamakrishnan's research contributions are transforming food processing sector through multidimensional (3D / 4D) food printing. He has custom built in-house designed 3D food printer which could print wide range of food materials from semi-solid paste to hydrogels. He is credited with India's first publication on 3D and 4D food printing. Some of the novel printed food products are: Designer 3D printed egg, Customized and personalized delivery of curcumin through spontaneous color transformation of sago constructs using 4D food printing technology, Fiber and protein enriched personalized 3D printed snack from indigenous millets, pulses, mushroom. His researches have been focused on efficient utilization of milling fractions of rice using 3D printing, 3D printed functional cookies from valorization of food waste, towards development of sustainable foods of future. Also to promote health through 3D printed probiotic snack to improve the gut health, 3D printed chicken nuggets – a customized snack with enrichment of dietary fiber to combat lifestyle disorders. Customized 3D printed biodegradable food package from agricultural biomass, suitable alternative for petroleum-based food packing materials is also accounted to his reach accomplishments.

=== CSIR Designer Rice ===
Dr. Anandharamakrishnan has developed a diabetic-friendly, nutrient-enriched designer rice through extrusion technology. Dr. Anandharamakrishnan has received the Tata Transformation Prize 2024, instituted by the Tata Sons and The New York Academy of Sciences, for developing the designer rice. He mentioned "CSIR–NIIST is pleased to collaborate with Tata Consumer Products in advancing the societal impact of indigenous technologies. This partnership underscores the Institute’s mandate to translate laboratory output into solutions that contribute to national priorities in nutrition, wellness, and industrial competitiveness." The developed rice kernels contain over 20% protein and have a low glycemic index (GI < 55), along with enhanced dietary fiber content compared to normal rice, which supports digestive health and prolonged satiety. In addition, the rice is fortified with essential micronutrients including iron, folic acid, and vitamin B12 to improve its nutritional quality and address micronutrient deficiencies. This is a significant step towards simultaneously combating lifestyle-related diseases and malnutrition by transforming a traditional staple into a smarter and nutritionally advanced food. The Dossier reported it to be the cornerstone of ‘Green Revolution 2.0’, marking a strategic pivot in India’s agricultural history. The technology has been successfully transferred to Tata Consumer Products Limited and SS Soul Foods of Tamil Nadu.

=== Sustainable Packaging Solutions ===
Dr. Anandharamakrishnan serves as the Mission Director of the ‘National Mission on Sustainable Packaging Solutions for Net Zero Future’, India’s 1st integrated mission-mode project on sustainable packaging. The program, funded by the CSIR and led by CSIR-NIIST, is developing a comprehensive solution framework to meet sustainable packaging demands, including alternative packaging materials, innovative recycling/reuse methods, and advanced testing and monitoring facilities. The initiative focuses on achieving a net-zero future through advanced, integrated innovations that leverage the collective strengths of partnering CSIR labs and industry partners. The mission also aims to establish a state-of-the-art biodegradability testing and monitoring center. Apart from these focus areas, the mission also explores innovative solutions to address issues related to microplastics, the utilization of packaging waste, and blockchain-based traceability solutions for the packaging industry.

== Awards and honors ==
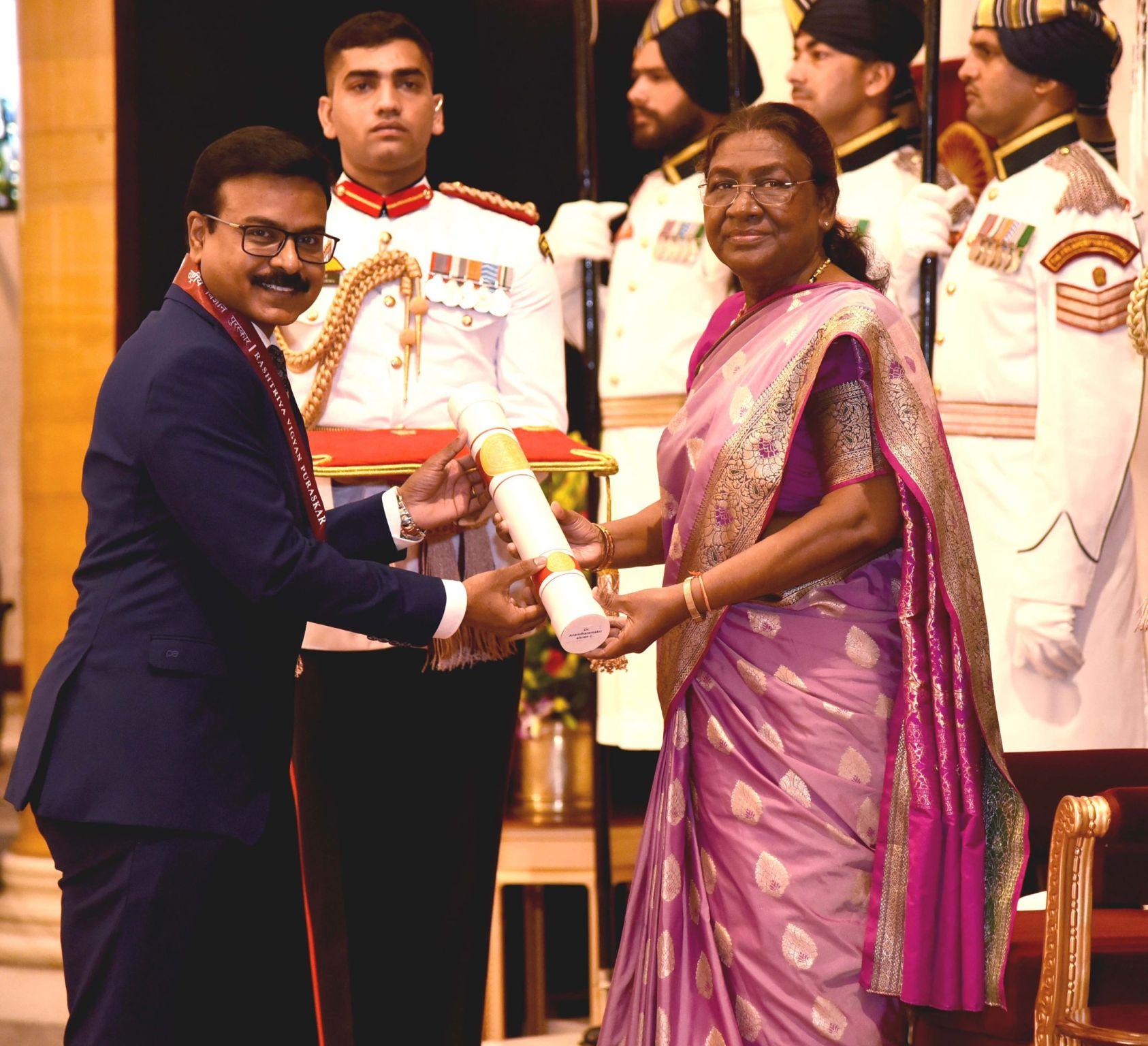
Dr. C. Anandharamakrishnan receiving Vigyan Shri Award from President Droupadi Murmu in August 2024

=== Awards and honors ===
- Vigyan Shri Award under Rashtriya Vigyan Puraskar scheme (2024)
- TATA Transformation Prize, Instituted by New York Academy of Sciences and TATA Sons (2024), under the theme Food Security
- ICAR-Rafi Ahmed Kidwai Award for Outstanding Research in Agricultural Sciences- 2019
- Tata Innovation Fellowship (DBT, Govt. of India) 2019-20
- NASI Reliance Industries Platinum Jubilee Award (2018)
- National Design Award in Environmental Engineering (2019)
- All India Food Processors Association (AIFPA) Special Platinum Jubilee Award (2018)
- Alkyl Amines Padma Bhushan Prof. B.D. Tilak CHEMCON Distinguished Speaker Award (2016)

=== Election to prestigious international academies ===
- Fellow of Royal Society of Chemistry (RSC) (2016)
- Fellow of Royal Society of Biology (RSB)

=== Election to prestigious national academies ===
- Fellow of National Academy of Sciences (NASc) (2019)
- Fellow of National Academy of Agricultural Sciences (NAAS) (2019)
- Fellow of Indian Chemical Society (FICS)
- Fellow of Association of Food Scientists and Technologists (India) AFST(I) (2017)
- Fellow of Kerala Academy of Science (2023)
- Fellow of the Indian National Academy of Engineering (FNAE) (2026)

=== Other notable recognitions ===
- Listed among the top 5% of scientists globally in the Global Scientist Index by Scirank Global.
- Listed on the 2025 Asian Scientist 100 by Asian Scientist.
- Ranked as Top 2 percentile of the scientist working in Food Science by Elsevier BV and Stanford University.
- Ranked #1 among the Highly Ranked Scholars by ScholarGPS in the field of Food Engineering in Prior Five Years.

== Books ==
=== Authored Books ===
- Anandharamakrishnan, C.; Moses, Jeyan A.; Santhoshkumar, P. (2026). 4D Printing of Foods: Fundamentals, Applications and Prospects. Wiley. doi:10.1002/9781394305285. ISBN 9781394305285.
- Anandharamakrishnan, C.; Moses, Jeyan A.; Anukiruthika, T. (2022). 3D Printing of Foods. Wiley. doi:10.1002/9781119669838. ISBN 978-1-119-66982-1.
- Anandharamakrishnan, C.; Moses, Jeyan A.; Priyanka, S. (2023). Food Digestion and Absorption: Its Role in Food Product Development. Royal Society of Chemistry. doi:10.1039/9781839162428. ISBN 978-1-83916-242-8.
- Anandharamakrishnan, C.; Ishwarya, S. Padma (2019). Essentials and Applications of Food Engineering. Taylor & Francis. doi:10.1201/9780429430244. ISBN 978-0-429-43024-4.
- Anandharamakrishnan, C.; Ishwarya, S. Padma (2015). Spray Drying Techniques for Food Ingredient Encapsulation. Wiley. doi:10.1002/9781118863985. ISBN 9781118863985.
- Anandharamakrishnan, C., ed. (2014). Techniques for Nanoencapsulation of Food Ingredients. SpringerBriefs in Food, Health, and Nutrition. doi:10.1007/978-1-4614-9387-7. ISBN 978-1-4614-9386-0.
- Anandharamakrishnan, C. (2013). Computational Fluid Dynamics Applications in Food Processing. doi:10.1007/978-1-4614-7990-1. ISBN 978-1-4614-7989-5.

=== Edited Books ===
- Sachin, Mandavgane; Anandharamakrishnan, C.; Shweta, Deotale, eds. (2026). Millets: A Sustainable and Nutritious Crop. Springer. doi:10.1007/978-3-032-16300-4. ISBN 978-3-032-16300-4.
- Anandharamakrishnan, C.; Moses, Jeyan Arthur; Murugesan, Pramila; Leena, M. Maria, eds. (2025). Utilizing Microfluidics in the Food Industry. Elsevier. doi:10.1016/C2022-0-02046-8. ISBN 978-0-443-13453-1.
- Anandharamakrishnan, C.; Moses, Jeyan Arthur; Leena, Maria, eds. (2025). Nanotechnology for Sustainable Food Packaging. Wiley. doi:10.1002/9781119875154. ISBN 9781119875154.
- Anandharamakrishnan, C.; Moses, Jeyan Arthur; Yoha, K. S., eds. (2025). Conductive Hydro Drying of Foods. doi:10.1016/C2021-0-02586-4. ISBN 978-0-323-95602-4.
- Anandharamakrishnan, C.; Subramaniam, Parthasarathy, eds. (2023). Industrial Application of Functional Foods, Ingredients and Nutraceuticals: Extraction, Processing and Formulation of Bioactive Compounds. Academic Press. doi:10.1016/C2021-0-02586-4. ISBN 978-0-12-824312-1.
- Anandharamakrishnan, C.; Sinija, V. R.; Mahendran, R. (2024). Non-Thermal Technologies for the Food Industry: Advances and Regulations. Taylor & Francis. doi:10.1201/9781003359302. ISBN 978-1-003-35930-2.
- Sunil, C.K; Athmaselvi, K.A; Venkatachalapathy, N; Anandharamakrishnan, C.; Balasubramaniam, V. M., eds. (2024). Unit Operations in Food Grain Processing. Academic Press. doi:10.1016/C2022-0-00599-7. ISBN 978-0-443-18965-4.
- Anandharamakrishnan, C.; Moses, Jeyan Arthur, eds. (2024). Emerging Technologies for the Food Industry, Volume 1: Fundamentals of Food Processing Technology. Apple Academic Press. doi:10.1201/9781003413592. ISBN 9781003413592.
- Anandharamakrishnan, C.; Moses, Jeyan Arthur, eds. (2024). Emerging Technologies for the Food Industry, Volume 2: Advances in Nonthermal Processing Technologies. Apple Academic Press. doi:10.1201/9781003413615. ISBN 9781003413615.
- Anandharamakrishnan, C.; Moses, Jeyan Arthur, eds. (2024). Emerging Technologies for the Food Industry, Volume 3: ICT Applications and Future Trends in Food Processing. Apple Academic Press. doi:10.1201/9781003413660. ISBN 9781003413660.
- Anandharamakrishnan, C.; Dutta, Sayantani, eds. (2023). Liposomal Encapsulation in Food Science and Technology. Academic Press. doi:10.1016/C2020-0-01138-2. ISBN 978-0-12-823935-3.
- Anandharamakrishnan, C.; Rawson, Ashish; Sunil, C. K., eds. (2022). Handbook of Millets - Processing, Quality, and Nutrition Status. Springer Nature. doi:10.1007/978-981-16-7224-8. ISBN 978-981-16-7223-1.
- Anandharamakrishnan, C.; Parthasarathi, S., eds. (2019). Food Nanotechnology: Principles and Applications. CRC Press. doi:10.1201/9781315153872. ISBN 978-1-315-15387-2.
- Anandharamakrishnan, C., ed. (2017). Handbook of Drying for Dairy Products. Wiley. doi:10.1002/9781118930526. ISBN 978-1-118-93049-6.
