= Vigyan Ratna Award =

India's highest science award

- Country: India
- Presented by: President of India
- Established: 21 September 2023; 3 years ago
- First award: Govindarajan Padmanaban (2024)
- Final award: Jayant Narlikar (2025)

Highlights
- Total: 2
- Website: https://awards.gov.in/

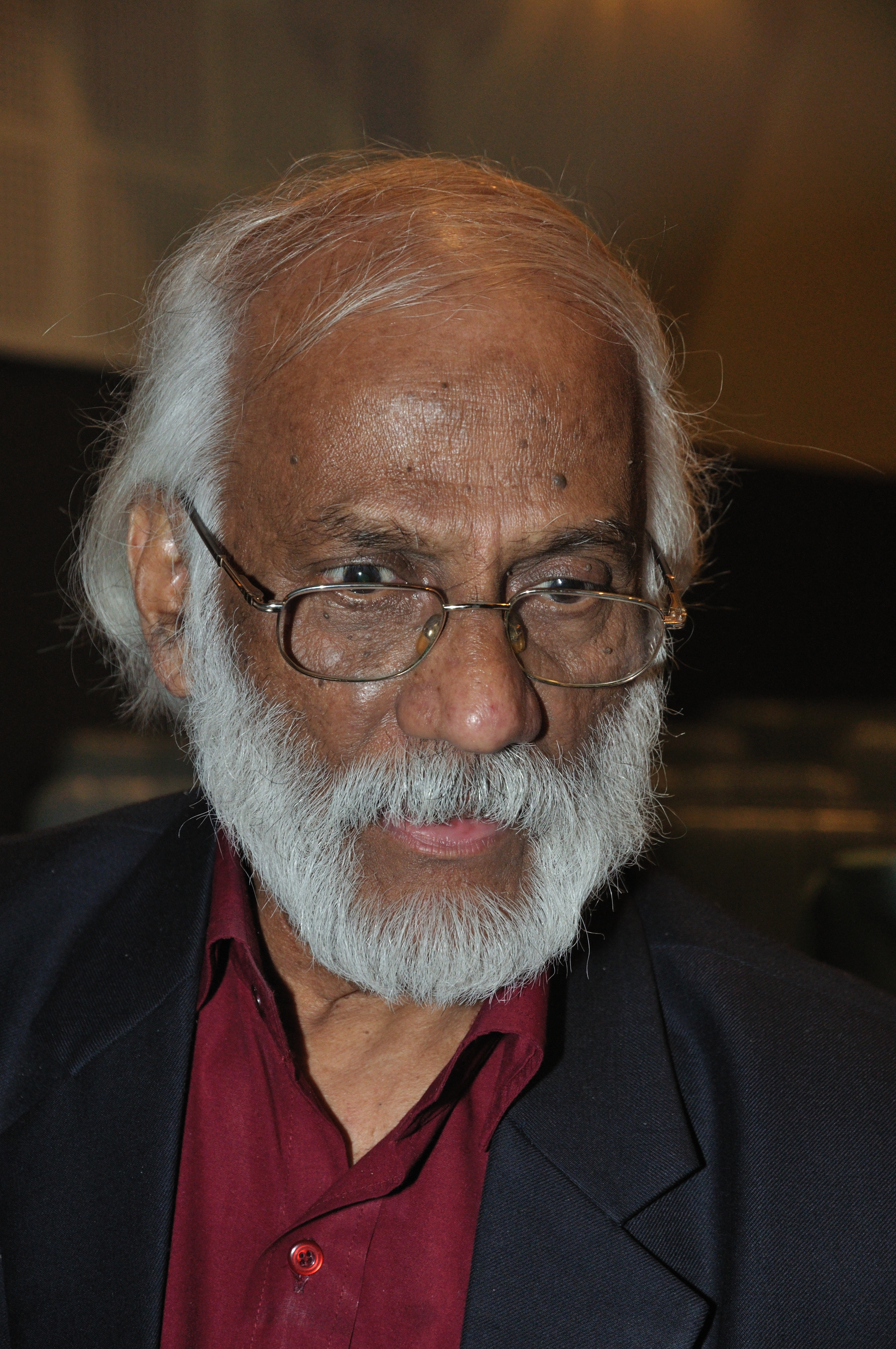
Govindarajan Padmanaban, the first recipient of the Vigyan Ratna Award

The Vigyan Ratna Award (Jewel of Science) is the highest honour conferred by the Government of India for outstanding achievements in science, technology, and innovation. Established in 2023 and first awarded in 2024, the award recognizes individuals for their lifetime contributions to the field of science and technology. Often regarded as the Indian equivalent of the Nobel Prize, the Vigyan Ratna is part of the Rashtriya Vigyan Puraskar scheme, which also includes three other awards — Vigyan Shri, Vigyan Yuva-Shanti Swarup Bhatnagar, and Vigyan Team.

A maximum of three individuals are selected each year to receive the Vigyan Ratna Award. Nominations are invited annually from 14 January to 28 February, coinciding with National Science Day. The award recipients are announced on 11 May, National Technology Day, and the awards are presented on 23 August, National Space Day.

In its inaugural year, the Vigyan Ratna Award was awarded to Govindarajan Padmanabhan, a biochemist renowned for his work on the malaria parasite. This recognition highlighted his lifetime achievements in the field of biological sciences.

== Recipients ==
Sl. No.	Year	Name	Field/Domain
1	2024	Govindarajan Padmanaban	Biochemistry
2	2025	Jayant Narlikar	Astrophysics
