= M. Thomas Thangaraj =

Indian theologian

M. Thomas Thangaraj (1942-2026) is an Indian theologian and psalmist. He is the former D.W. and Ruth Brooks Professor Emeritus of World Christianity of Candler School of Theology at Emory University in Atlanta, Georgia. Thangaraj is currently serving as a Visiting Professor of World Christianity at Boston University School of Theology.

== Biography ==
Grew up in Tamil Nadu, India, Thangaraj served as a pastor and a theology teacher in India before coming to Atlanta in 1988 to join the Candler School of Theology at Emory University as a visiting professor. He holds a BSc from St. John's College and a BD from Serampore College. He completed his master's in theology from United Theological College and earned a doctorate in theology from Harvard Divinity School. Retiring in 2008, Thangaraj held his professorship in "World Christianity" at Candler School of Theology for 20 years. He has worked extensively to promote interreligious dialogue both at national and international level. He has also written several books and hymns in Tamil. The hymns are written for use in some of the churches of India.

== Works ==
- The Common Task: A Theology of Christian Mission (Abingdon Press, 1999)
- Relating to People of Other Religions: What Every Christian Needs to Know (Abingdon Press, 1997)
- The Crucified Guru: An Experiment in Cross-Cultural Christology (Abingdon Press, 1994)
- Preaching as Communication (1986)
