= Kumaraswamy Thangaraj =

Indian geneticist

K. Thangaraj
- கு. தங்கராஜ்
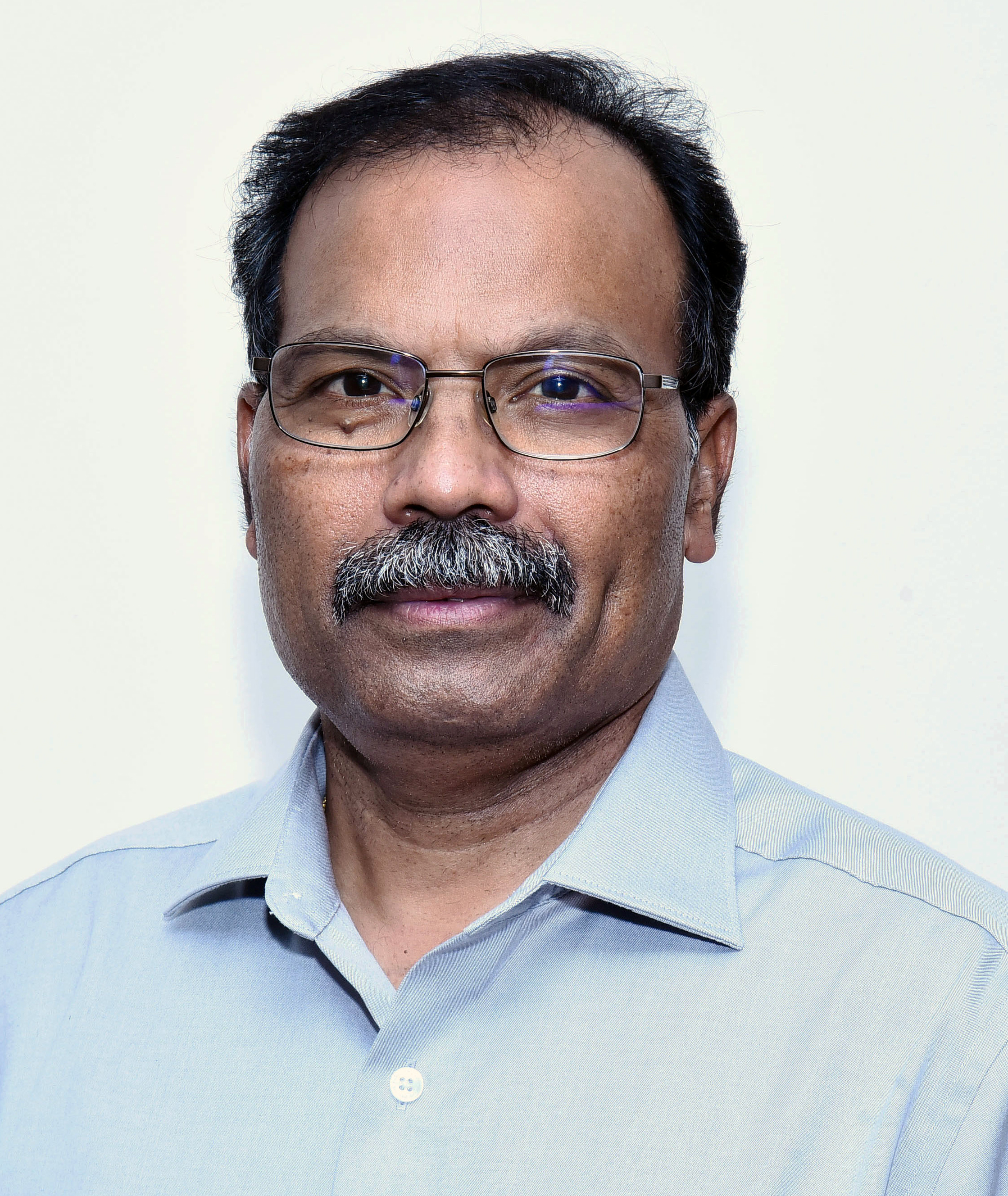
- Born: Cheyyur, Tamil Nadu, India
- Education: Madurai Kamaraj University
- Known for: Genetic history of the Indian population
- Awards: Padma Shri (2026); J.C. Bose National Fellowship
- Scientific career
- Fields: Genetics, population genetics
- Workplaces: Centre for Cellular and Molecular Biology (CCMB); Centre for DNA Fingerprinting and Diagnostics (CDFD)

Kumarasamy Thangaraj is an Indian geneticist and molecular biology researcher. He is a senior scientist at the Centre for Cellular and Molecular Biology (CCMB) in Hyderabad. For his significant contributions to research, the Government of India honored him with the Padma Shri, the fourth-highest civilian award, in 2026.

== Earlier life ==
Born on 2 June 1963, in Cheyyur, Kanchipuram district, Tamil Nadu, Thangaraj completed his Bachelor of Science (B.Sc.) in 1984 and his Master of Science (M.Sc.) in 1988 at the University of Madras. After completing his M.Phil. in 1989, he did doctoral research in genetics at the University of Madras (Taramani Campus) and was awarded his Ph.D. in 1996.

== Research career ==
Shortly before receiving his doctorate in 1993, he joined the Centre for Cellular and Molecular Biology (CCMB) in Hyderabad as a scientist. He later became a senior scientist at the institute. His research primarily focuses on human population genetics.

=== Origins of the Indian Population ===
He contributed to research on the genetic structure of Indian populations, including studies supporting the model that present-day Indians derive ancestry from two ancient groups known as Ancestral North Indians (ANI) and Ancestral South Indians (ASI).

=== Andaman tribes ===
He led studies on the genetic history of Andamanese tribes, including the Onge and Great Andamanese which found that their maternal lineages belong to haplogroup M and show deep divergence within Asian populations, supporting models of early modern human dispersal into Asia.

=== Genetic diseases ===
He conducted detailed studies on genetic diseases caused by the caste system and consanguineous marriages (marrying close relatives) prevalent in India.

=== COVID-19 ===
During the COVID-19 pandemic, he co-authored a genomic study examining genetic susceptibility to SARS-CoV-2 among isolated and endogamous South Asian populations.

== Awards and recognitions ==
- Padma Shri (2026) – For contributions to Science and Engineering, Government of India
- Rashtriya Vigyan Puraskar (2025)
- J. C. Bose Fellowship, CSIR-India (2019)
- Fellow – Indian National Science Academy (INSA)
- Fellow – Indian Academy of Sciences (IASc)
- Sun Pharma Research Award (Medical Sciences)
