= Bhalchandra Udgaonkar =

Indian theoretical Physicist

- Born: 30 October 1927; India
- Died: 21 December 2014 (aged 87)
- Occupations: Theoretical particle physicist, Academic, Educationist
- Awards: Padma Bhushan

Bhalchandra Madhav Udgaonkar (Marathi: Bhalchandra Mādhava Udgāṁvakara, pronounced [bʱaːlˌtʃəɾə ˈmədʱəʋᵊ ˈud̪aːɳʋkəɾᵊ]), popularly known as B.M. Udgaonkar, was an Indian theoretical particle physicist, scientist, educationist and the co-editor of the book, A Nuclear-Weapon-Free World: Desirable?, Feasible?. His contributions have been reported in the development of Homi Bhabha Centre for Science Education (HBCSE), Institute of Physics, Bhubaneswar and Marathi Vidnyan Parishad (MaViPa). An alumnus of the Raja Shivaji Vidyalaya (erstwhile King George School), he is a member of the Institute of Advanced Study, USA, a scientists' community, and a former president of the Marathi Vidnyan Parishad. He is the author of several books and has contributed content to books written by others. The Government of India awarded him the third highest civilian honour of the Padma Bhushan, in 1985, for his contributions to science and technology.
