= Shanti Swarup Bhatnagar Prize for Science and Technology =

Indian research award

- Awarded for: Research in science in India
- Location: Vigyan Bhawan, New Delhi
- Presented by: Council of Scientific and Industrial Research; Government of India
- First award: 1958
- Final award: 2025
- Website: Bhatnagar Prize website

The Shanti Swarup Bhatnagar Prize for Science and Technology (SSB) is a science award in India given annually by the Council of Scientific and Industrial Research (CSIR) for notable and outstanding research, applied or fundamental, in biology, chemistry, environmental science, engineering, mathematics, medicine, and physics. The prize recognized outstanding Indian work (according to the view of CSIR awarding committee) in science and technology. It was the highest, most prestigious and coveted prize given in the area of multidisciplinary science in India. The award was named after the founder Director of the Council of Scientific & Industrial Research, Shanti Swarup Bhatnagar. It was first awarded in 1958.

In 2024, the Government of India continued the Shanti Swarup Bhatnagar Prize for Science and Technology with the Rashtriya Vigyan Puraskar called the Vigyan Yuva - Shanti Swarup Bhatnagar Award. While the prize money and lifetime monthly fellowship were removed, the award's stature has been elevated to align with India's prestigious Padma awards, which also do not include a monetary component. The Rashtriya Vigyan Puraskar has been designed to bring the same level of respect and honor to scientific achievements as the Padma awards do for other fields.

Recipients of the Vigyan Yuva - Shanti Swarup Bhatnagar Award are honored with a national ceremony held at Rashtrapati Bhavan, where the awards are presented by the President of India in the presence of the Minister of Science and top officials from India's leading scientific institutions. This format ensures that the awardees receive the same recognition, respect, and dignity as Padma award recipients, reflecting the government's continued commitment to honoring significant contributions to science and technology in India.

Any citizen of India engaged in research in any field of science and technology up to the age of 45 years was eligible for the prize. The prize was awarded on the basis of contributions made through work done in India only during the five years preceding the year of the prize.

== Nomination and selection ==
Names of candidates were proposed by a member of the governing body of the Council of Scientific and Industrial Research (CSIR), Vice-Chancellors of universities or institutes of national importance, and deans of different faculties of science and former awardees. Selection was made by the Advisory Committee constituted each year and necessarily consists of at least six experts including at least one former Bhatnagar Awardee in the respective discipline. At least 2/3 agreement of the members was required for selection. If two nominees were unanimously recommended in the same field because of equal merit, both are awarded.

== Prizes ==
The prize was divided into seven disciplines, namely:

- Biological sciences
- Chemical sciences
- Earth, atmosphere, ocean and planetary sciences
- Engineering sciences
- Mathematical sciences
- Medical sciences
- Physical sciences

Each discipline could have multiple winners (maximum two individuals). Up until 2007, the prize money was ₹2 lakh (US$2,100) and was raised to ₹5 lakh (US$5,300) in 2008.

== Recipients ==
- List of Shanti Swarup Bhatnagar Prize recipients

== Presentation ==
The names of the recipients were traditionally declared by the Director General on every 26 September, which is the CSIR Foundation Day. The prize was distributed by the Prime Minister of India. The awardee was bound to give a lecture in the area of the award, generally outside his/her city of work.

From 2024 Recipients of the Vigyan Yuva - Shanti Swarup Bhatnagar Award are honored with a national ceremony held at Rashtrapati Bhavan, where the awards are presented by the President of India in the presence of the Minister of Science and top officials from India's leading scientific institutions. This format ensures that the awardees receive the same recognition, respect, and dignity as Padma award recipients, reflecting the government's continued commitment to honoring significant contributions to science and technology in India.

== See also ==
- Rashtriya Vigyan Puraskar
- Vigyan Ratna Award
- List of general science and technology awards
