= Star Gazers (2016 season) =

- No. of episodes: 52

Release
- Original network: PBS
- Original release: January 4 – December 26, 2016

Season chronology
- ← Previous (2015 season) Next → (2017 season)

The 2016 season of the astronomy TV show Star Gazers starring Dean Regas and James Albury started on January 4, 2016.

== 2016 season ==
No. overall	No. in season	Title	Directed by	Written by	Original release date
1987	#16-01	"The Venus-Saturn Super Scootchie!"	--	--	January 4, 2016
1988	#16-02	"It’s a Two Bears, Two Dog Night"	--	--	January 11, 2016
1989	#16-03	"Supermarket Solar System!"	--	--	January 18, 2016
1990	#16-04	"The Winter Football"	--	--	January 25, 2016
1991	#16-05	"Jupiter and the High Flyin' Lion"	--	--	February 1, 2016
1992	#16-06	"The Long-Awaited Moon-Joke Episode"	--	--	February 8, 2016
1993	#16-07	"The Jovi-Lunar Super Scootchie"	--	--	February 15, 2016
1994	#16-08	"Happy Leap Day"	--	--	February 22, 2016
1995	#16-09	"Jupiter in Opposition"	--	--	February 29, 2016
1996	#16-10	"The Four Corner Stars of Orion the Hunter"	--	--	March 7, 2016
1997	#16-11	"The 2016 Equinox Super Scootchie"	--	--	March 14, 2016
1998	#16-12	"The Truth About the North Star"	--	--	March 21, 2016
1999	#16-13	"The 13th Constellation"	--	--	March 28, 2016
2000	#16-14	"Arc to Arcturus"	--	--	April 4, 2016
2001	#16-15	"Let's Go Retro"	--	--	April 11, 2016
2002	#16-16	"Low Lyin' Orion and the High Flyin' Lion"	--	--	April 18, 2016
2003	#16-17	"Transit Fever!"	--	--	April 25, 2016
2004	#16-18	"The Transit of Mercury"	--	--	May 2, 2016
2005	#16-19	"The Great Midnight Triangle Fest"	--	--	May 9, 2016
2006	#16-20	"Mars Midnight Madness"	--	--	May 16, 2016
2007	#16-21	"Saturn"	--	--	May 23, 2016
2008	#16-22	"Head to Head, Planet to Planet"	--	--	May 30, 2016
2009	#16-23	"Day Star Day and the Honey Moon"	--	--	June 6, 2016
2010	#16-24	"Let's Go to Mars"	--	--	June 13, 2016
2011	#16-25	"Phase-Eriffic Part One"	--	--	June 20, 2016
2012	#16-26	"Jupiter is Ready for His Close-up"	--	--	June 27, 2016
2013	#16-27	"Phase-Eriffic Part Two"	--	--	July 4, 2016
2014	#16-28	"Circumpolar Constellation and Seasonal Stars"	--	--	July 11, 2016
2015	#16-29	"Zubenesha-what?! Zubenelge-who?!"	--	--	July 18, 2016
2016	#16-30	"Seeing the Shapes in the Stars"	--	--	July 25, 2016
2017	#16-31	"Daring Delphinus"	--	--	August 1, 2016
2018	#16-32	"Finding Five Naked Eye Planets"	--	--	August 8, 2016
2019	#16-33	"Venus and Jupiter Meet Again"	--	--	August 15, 2016
2020	#16-34	"Mars, Antares, The Sting and More"	--	--	August 22, 2016
2021	#16-35	"Two Triangles This Labor Day"	--	--	August 29, 2016
2022	#16-36	"Up All Night with the Harvest Moon"	--	--	September 5, 2016
2023	#16-37	"The Scorpion and his Teapot"	--	--	September 11, 2016
2024	#16-38	"Finding Direction"	--	--	September 19, 2016
2025	#16-39	"Cygnus: The Amazing Celestial Swan"	--	--	September 26, 2016
2026	#16-40	"From Dusk til' Dawn with Five Planets"	--	--	October 3, 2016
2027	#16-41	"October Planet Parade"	--	--	October 10, 2016
2028	#16-42	"The Fall Sky Saga"	--	--	October 17, 2016
2029	#16-43	"The Moon Visits Three Planets"	--	--	October 24, 2016
2030	#16-44	"40 Years of Gazing at the Stars"	--	--	October 31, 2016
2030	#16-45	"Venus"	--	--	November 7, 2016
2031	#16-46	"Seven Sisters, Double Cluster and More"	--	--	November 14, 2016
2032	#16-47	"Polygon Party"	--	--	November 21, 2016
2033	#16-48	"Good-Bye Summer Triangle, Hello Orion"	--	--	November 27, 2016
2034	#16-49	"The Moon vs The Geminids"	--	--	December 5, 2016
2035	#16-50	"Touring the Rocky Planets"	--	--	December 12, 2016
2036	#16-51	"I Feel Gassy"	--	--	December 19, 2016
2037	#16-52	"Highlights of the New Year"	--	--	December 26, 2016
