= Star Gazers (2013 season) =

- No. of episodes: 52

Release
- Original network: PBS
- Original release: January 7 – December 30, 2013

Season chronology
- ← Previous (2012 season) Next → (2014 season)

The 2013 season of the astronomy TV show Star Gazers starring Dean Regas, James Albury, and Marlene Hidalgo started on January 7, 2013. The show's episode numbering scheme changed several times during its run to coincide with major events in the show's history. The official Star Gazer website hosts the complete scripts for each of the shows.

== 2013 season ==
| No. overall | No. in season | Title | Directed by | Written by | Original release date |
|---|---|---|---|---|---|
| 1831 | #13-01 | "The Changing Stars When You Head North Or South" | Misbell Vargas-Leal | Bill Dishong, Dean Regas, James Albury | January 7, 2013 |
| 1832 | #13-02 | "Don't Worry About Winter, It's The Shortest Season" | -- | -- | January 14, 2013 |
| 1833 | #13-03 | "Meet The Orion Family" | -- | -- | January 21, 2013 |
| 1834 | #13-04 | "Jumpin' Jupiter" | -- | -- | January 28, 2013 |
| 1835 | #13-05 | "The Three M's Of February" | Erlin Morandeira | Bill Dishong, Dean Regas, James Albury | February 4, 2013 |
| 1836 | #13-06 | "Two Clusters Get Some Company" | -- | -- | February 11, 2013 |
| 1837 | #13-07 | "The Four Brightest Stars Of Orion The Hunter" | -- | -- | February 18, 2013 |
| 1838 | #13-08 | "I Eat Green Caterpillars When Looking At Jupiter" | -- | -- | February 25, 2013 |
| 1839 | #13-09 | "Three Stars With Nifty Names And A Comet Alert!" | Erlin Morandeira | Bill Dishong, Dean Regas, James Albury | March 4, 2013 |
| 1840 | #13-10 | "Two Dogs And One Really Big Cat" | -- | -- | March 11, 2013 |
| 1841 | #13-11 | "Happy Spring Of The Leaf And Happy Spring Of The Year" | -- | Unknown | March 18, 2013 |
| 1842 | #13-12 | "The Truth About The North Star" | -- | -- | March 25, 2013 |
| 1843 | #13-13 | "Twin Stars Hang Out With The Twin Planets" | Erlin Morandeira | Bill Dishong, Dean Regas, James Albury | April 1, 2013 |
| 1844 | #13-14 | "Astronomy Day And More" | -- | -- | April 8, 2013 |
| 1845 | #13-15 | "Take The Seven Day Star Gazers Challenge" | -- | -- | April 15, 2013 |
| 1846 | #13-16 | "There's Something Special About Saturn" | -- | -- | April 22, 2013 |
| 1847 | #13-17 | "The Moon Kisses Winter And Jupiter Good-Bye" | -- | -- | April 29, 2013 |
| 1848 | #13-18 | "Farewell to Orion, Look High For The Lion, And Get Ready For The Scorpion" | Erlin Morandeira | Bill Dishong, Dean Regas, James Albury | May 6, 2013 |
| 1849 | #13-19 | "A Planetary Feast For May" | -- | -- | May 13, 2013 |
| 1850 | #13-20 | "Oh, Venus!" | -- | -- | May 20, 2013 |
| 1851 | #13-21 | "That Lucky Old Sun" | -- | -- | May 27, 2013 |
| 1852 | #13-22 | "Star Gazing On The Shortest Nights Of The Year" | Erlin Morandeira | Bill Dishong, Dean Regas, James Albury | June 3, 2013 |
| 1853 | #13-23 | "Does That Moon Look Super To You?" | -- | -- | June 10, 2013 |
| 1854 | #13-24 | "Comet Report" | -- | -- | June 17, 2013 |
| 1855 | #13-25 | "The Wonderful Stars Of Summer" | -- | -- | June 24, 2013 |
| 1856 | #13-26 | "A Distant Sun and Proximate Planets" | -- | -- | July 1, 2013 |
| 1857 | #13-27 | "Asterisms of the Summer Sky" | Erlin Morandeira | Bill Dishong, Dean Regas, James Albury | July 8, 2013 |
| 1858 | #13-28 | "As Planets Align, a Wonderful Star Reawakens" | -- | -- | July 15, 2013 |
| 1859 | #13-29 | "Let Sagittarius Be Your Guide" | Erlin Morandeira | Bill Dishong, Dean Regas, James Albury | July 22, 2013 |
| 1860 | #13-30 | "Plan Now For The Perseid Meteor Shower" | -- | -- | July 29, 2013 |
| 1861 | #13-31 | "Don't Miss Next Week's Perseid Meteor Shower" | -- | -- | August 5, 2013 |
| 1862 | #13-32 | "Sizing Up The Stars Of The Summer Triangle" | -- | -- | August 12, 2013 |
| 1863 | #13-33 | "A Preview Of Winter's Stars In August" | -- | -- | August 19, 2013 |
| 1864 | #13-34 | "Where Did All These Constellations Come From?" | -- | -- | August 26, 2013 |
| 1865 | #13-35 | "Star Hopping In The September Sky" | -- | -- | September 2, 2013 |
| 1866 | #13-36 | "All Night With The Harvest Moon" | -- | -- | September 9, 2013 |
| 1867 | #13-37 | "The Two Days Of The Year When The Sun Rises East And Sets West" | -- | -- | September 16, 2013 |
| 1868 | #13-38 | "The Curious Case Of The Wandering Stars" | -- | -- | September 23, 2013 |
| 1869 | #13-39 | "How To Find The False Dawn Of Omar Khayyam" | -- | -- | September 30, 2013 |
| 1870 | #13-40 | "The Little King Meets The God Of War And Venus Meets The Rival Of Mars" | -- | -- | October 7, 2013 |
| 1871 | #13-41 | "Autumn Stars And Planets : And Why The Stars Change With The Seasons" | -- | -- | October 14, 2013 |
| 1872 | #13-42 | "Monsters in The Sky!" | -- | -- | October 21, 2013 |
| 1873 | #13-43 | "How To Spot A Planet In The Daylight" | -- | -- | October 28, 2013 |
| 1874 | #13-44 | "Good-Bye Summer Triangle, Hello Orion" | -- | -- | November 4, 2013 |
| 1875 | #13-45 | "Double Your Cluster, Double Your Fun and the Farthest Thing You Can See With the Naked Eye" | -- | -- | November 11, 2013 |
| 1876 | #13-46 | "I See, Icy Comet Ison" | -- | -- | November 18, 2013 |
| 1877 | #13-47 | "The Celestial Sign Of Winter And The Brightest That Venus Can Get" | -- | -- | November 25, 2013 |
| 1878 | #13-48 | "Good-bye Summer Triangle, Hello Winter Hexagon" | -- | -- | December 2, 2013 |
| 1879 | #13-49 | "Tis The Season For Crescent Venus" | -- | -- | December 9, 2013 |
| 1880 | #13-50 | "Off To The Races With Venus And Jupiter" | -- | -- | December 16, 2013 |
| 1881 | #13-51 | "Bye -bye Venus Goodbye And Celebrate The New Year With The New Year's Eve Star" | -- | -- | December 23, 2013 |
| 1882 | #13-52 | "Here Comes The Sun" | -- | -- | December 30, 2013 |
