= Star Gazers (2014 season) =

- No. of episodes: 52

Release
- Original network: PBS
- Original release: January 6 – December 29, 2014

Season chronology
- ← Previous (2013 season) Next → (2015 season)

The 2014 season of the astronomy TV show Star Gazers starring Dean Regas, James Albury, and Marlene Hidalgo started on January 6, 2014. Marlene Hidalgo's final appearance on the show was in episode 14-13 which first aired on March 31, 2014. The show's episode numbering scheme changed several times during its run to coincide with major events in the show's history. The official Star Gazer website hosts the complete scripts for each of the shows.

== 2014 season ==
No. overall	No. in season	Title	Directed by	Written by	Original release date
1883	#14-01	"The Wimpy Moon Points the Way to the Biggest Planet and UFO Alert"	--	--	January 6, 2014
1884	#14-02	"Spica And Mars Sandwich The Moon"	--	--	January 13, 2014
1885	#14-03	"A New Perspective On Orion"	--	--	January 20, 2014
1886	#14-04	"The Great Orion Nebula"	--	--	January 27, 2014
1887	#14-05	"Happy Birthday Galileo"	--	--	February 3, 2014
1888	#14-06	"The False Dusk And The Moon Finds Four Fabulous Planets"	--	--	February 10, 2014
1889	#14-07	"You Ain't Nothing But A Hound Dog"	--	--	February 17, 2014
1890	#14-08	"Jupiter And The Gemini Twins"	--	--	February 24, 2014
1891	#14-09	"In Like a Lion, Out Like a Lamb"	--	--	March 3, 2014
1892	#14-10	"The Celestial Superhighway"	--	--	March 10, 2014
1893	#14-11	"The Winter Hexagon Plus Jupiter"	--	Unknown	March 17, 2014
1894	#14-12	"The Strange Case of the Brightest Star We See the Most Often"	--	--	March 24, 2014
1895	#14-13	"The Martian Opposition of 2014"	--	--	March 31, 2014
1896	#14-14	"The Tax Day Lunar Eclipse"	--	--	April 7, 2014
1897	#14-15	"Planet Hopping All Night Long!"	--	--	April 14, 2014
1898	#14-16	"Follow the Arc to Arcturus and Hit a Spike to Spica"	--	--	April 21, 2014
1899	#14-17	"Astronomy Day and More"	--	--	April 28, 2014
1900	#14-18	"May Is Your Month to See Mercury"	--	--	May 5, 2014
1901	#14-19	"Two Queens in the Morning Light and Watch the Wanderers"	--	--	May 12, 2014
1902	#14-20	"Triangles, Triangles - Part 2!"	--	--	May 19, 2014
1903	#14-21	"Those Short But Starry Nights of Summer are About to Arrive"	--	--	May 26, 2014
1904	#14-22	"A Late Night Line-Up"	--	--	June 2, 2014
1905	#14-23	"Day-Star Day, 2014"	--	--	June 9, 2014
1906	#14-24	"The Lost Jewel in the Northern Crown"	--	--	June 16, 2014
1907	#14-25	"A Very Special Sky for the 5th of July"	--	--	June 23, 2014
1908	#14-26	"The Dragon and the Scorpion"	--	--	June 30, 2014
1909	#14-27	"It's Just a Phase I'm Going Through - Part One"	--	--	July 7, 2014
1910	#14-28	"Leo is Leaving and Orion Returns"	--	--	July 14, 2014
1911	#14-29	"It's Just a Phase I'm Going Through - Part Two"	--	--	July 21, 2014
1912	#14-30	"Super Moon? Not So Much"	--	--	July 28, 2014
1913	#14-31	"Looking North and South in the Summer Sky"	--	--	August 4, 2014
1914	#14-32	"Pairs of Pairs of Planets"	--	--	August 11, 2014
1915	#14-33	"A Busy Day in the Sky at the End of August"	--	--	August 18, 2014
1916	#14-34	"The Scorpion's Mad Tea Party"	--	--	August 25, 2014
1917	#14-35	"How to enjoy seeing the Milky Way"	--	--	September 1, 2014
1918	#14-36	"Super Sights on Autumn Nights"	--	--	September 8, 2014
1919	#14-37	"Mars Meets His Rival"	--	--	September 15, 2014
1920	#14-38	"Season Without Giants, or, Time of the Quiet Sky"	--	--	September 22, 2014
1921	#14-39	"I See a Pattern Here"	--	--	September 29, 2014
1922	#14-40	"The Fall Sky Saga"	--	--	October 6, 2014
1923	#14-41	"A Partial Solar Eclipse And Say Good-Bye to Saturn"	--	--	October 13, 2014
1924	#14-42	"Trick Or Treating With The Seven Sinister Sisters"	--	--	October 20, 2014
1925	#14-43	"Mars And The Teapot"	--	--	October 27, 2014
1926	#14-44	"Look For The Leonids Next Week"	--	--	November 3, 2014
1927	#14-45	"Capella And Vega : Bright Stars In The North-ish Sky"	--	--	November 10, 2014
1928	#14-46	"Cassiopeia : Queen Of The Northern Sky"	--	--	November 17, 2014
1929	#14-47	"Perfectly Positioned Polygons"	--	--	November 24, 2014
1930	#14-48	"UFO Alert And Moon Of The Short Shadows"	--	--	December 1, 2014
1931	#14-49	"This Week's Impact With An Ancient Asteroid And How To Watch It"	--	--	December 8, 2014
1932	#14-50	"The Reason For The Seasons"	--	--	December 15, 2014
1933	#14-51	"The Cosmos In Your Kitchen"	--	--	December 22, 2014
1934	#14-52	"Don't Worry About Winter, It's The Shortest Season Of The Year"	--	--	December 29, 2014
