= Star Gazers (2017 season) =

- No. of episodes: 52

Release
- Original network: PBS
- Original release: January 2 – December 25, 2017

Season chronology
- ← Previous (2016 season) Next → (2018 season)

The 2017 season of the astronomy TV show Star Gazers starring Dean Regas and James Albury started on January 2, 2017. The episodes from this season were listed as being an original production of WPBT2 South Florida PBS and were copyrighted to South Florida PBS, Inc.

== 2017 season ==
No. overall	No. in season	Title	Directed by	Written by	Original release date
2038	#17-01	"Mars and Venus Meet Again"	--	--	January 2, 2017
2039	#17-02	"Star Gazer Shootout"	--	--	January 9, 2017
2040	#17-03	"The Length of the Seasons"	--	--	January 16, 2017
2041	#17-04	"The Great Orion Nebula"	--	--	January 23, 2017
2042	#17-05	"Constellations Everywhere"	--	--	January 30, 2017
2043	#17-06	"Venus Misses Mars By That Much"	--	--	February 6, 2017
2044	#17-07	"Valentine’s Day Star!"	--	--	February 13, 2017
2045	#17-08	"Meet the Orion Family"	--	--	February 20, 2017
2046	#17-09	"Daylight Shifting Time"	--	--	February 27, 2017
2047	#17-10	"Two Dogs and One Really Big Cat"	--	--	March 6, 2017
2048	#17-11	"Equinox"	--	--	March 13, 2017
2049	#17-12	"Star Qualities"	--	--	March 20, 2017
2050	#17-13	"Royal Opposition"	--	--	March 27, 2017
2051	#17-14	"Seven Day Challenge"	--	--	April 3, 2017
2052	#17-15	"Let's Go Fly a Kite"	--	--	April 10, 2017
2053	#17-16	"Arc to Arcturus"	--	--	April 17, 2017
2054	#17-17	"Leaping Leo"	--	--	April 24, 2017
2055	#17-18	"Last Chance for Betelgeuse"	--	--	May 1, 2017
2056	#17-19	"Following the Drinking Gourd"	--	--	May 8, 2017
2057	#17-20	"Three Months Until the Big One"	--	--	May 15, 2017
2058	#17-21	"Care for Some Tea?"	--	--	May 22, 2017
2059	#17-22	"Jupiter and Saturn"	--	--	May 29, 2017
2060	#17-23	"Day Star Day 2017"	--	--	June 5, 2017
2061	#17-24	"Waking Up With Venus"	--	--	June 12, 2017
2062	#17-25	"Saturn - The Ringed Planet"	--	--	June 19, 2017
2063	#17-26	"The Sky on the 4th of July"	--	--	June 26, 2017
2064	#17-27	"Lyra the Harp"	--	--	July 3, 2017
2065	#17-28	"The Dragon and the Scorpion"	--	--	July 10, 2017
2066	#17-29	"One Month Until the Big One"	--	--	July 17, 2017
2067	#17-30	"Shapes in the Summer Sky"	--	--	July 24, 2017
2068	#17-31	"Maui's Fish Hook"	--	--	July 31, 2017
2069	#17-32	"Are You Eclipse Ready?"	--	--	August 7, 2017
2070	#17-33	"It's Moon Shadow Time!"	--	--	August 14, 2017
2071	#17-34	"The Stars in the Summer Triangle"	--	--	August 21, 2017
2072	#17-35	"The Stars of Pegasus"	--	--	August 28, 2017
2073	#17-36	"Along the Milky Way"	--	--	September 4, 2017
2074	#17-37	"Bye, Bye Jupiter"	--	--	September 11, 2017
2075	#17-38	"Saturn and the Moon"	--	--	September 18, 2017
2076	#17-39	"Perseus and the Seven Sisters"	--	--	September 25, 2017
2077	#17-40	"Venus and Mars Line Up Again"	--	--	October 2, 2017
2078	#17-41	"Andromeda!"	--	--	October 9, 2017
2079	#17-42	"Sayonara to Saturn"	--	--	October 16, 2017
2080	#17-43	"Legends in the Sky"	--	--	October 23, 2017
2081	#17-44	"Star Secrets"	--	--	October 30, 2017
2082	#17-45	"The Leonid Meteor Shower"	--	--	November 6, 2017
2083	#17-46	"Queen Cassiopeia"	--	--	November 13, 2017
2084	#17-47	"Staying Up Late with Orion"	--	--	November 20, 2017
2085	#17-48	"Supermoon 2017"	--	--	November 27, 2017
2086	#17-49	"Taurus"	--	--	December 4, 2017
2087	#17-50	"Tycho Brahe"	--	--	December 11, 2017
2088	#17-51	"Reason for the Seasons"	--	--	December 18, 2017
2089	#17-52	"Moon Over Orion"	--	--	December 25, 2017
