= Star Gazers (2015 season) =

- No. of episodes: 52

Release
- Original network: PBS
- Original release: January 5 – December 28, 2015

Season chronology
- ← Previous (2014 season) Next → (2016 season)

The 2015 season of the astronomy TV show Star Gazers starring Dean Regas and James Albury started on January 5, 2015. The show's episode numbering scheme changed several times during its run to coincide with major events in the show's history. The official Star Gazer website hosts the complete scripts for each of the shows.

== 2015 season ==
No. overall	No. in season	Title	Directed by	Written by	Original release date
1935	#15-01	"Dance Of The Planets"	--	--	January 5, 2015
1936	#15-02	"The Great Star And Constellation Shootout"	--	--	January 12, 2015
1937	#15-03	"All Hail The King"	--	--	January 19, 2015
1938	#15-04	"Meet The Orion Family"	--	--	January 26, 2015
1939	#15-05	"The Valentine's Day Stars"	Misbell Vargas-Leal	Bill Dishong, Dean Regas, James Albury	February 2, 2015
1940	#15-06	"Brightest Of The Bright"	--	--	February 9, 2015
1941	#15-07	"The God of Love vs The God Of War"	--	--	February 16, 2015
1942	#15-08	"Seeing Double: Twin Stars And Twin Planets"	--	--	February 23, 2015
1943	#15-09	"I Eat Green Caterpillars, Again?!"	Misbell Vargas-Leal	Bill Dishong, Dean Regas, James Albury	March 2, 2015
1944	#15-10	"Go Find Some Dark"	--	--	March 9, 2015
1945	#15-11	"Leo the Lion Chases Orion"	--	Unknown	March 16, 2015
1946	#15-12	"Three Lunar Eclipses In Less Than A Year"	--	--	March 23, 2015
1947	#15-13	"Bye-Bye Mars And Venus Vs The Pleiades"	--	--	March 30, 2015
1948	#15-14	"Venus Between The Clusters"	Erlin Morandeira	Bill Dishong, Dean Regas, James Albury	April 6, 2015
1949	#15-15	"Albedo"	--	--	April 13, 2015
1950	#15-16	"A Lion At Night With Plenty Of Planetary Light"	--	--	April 20, 2015
1951	#15-17	"Connecting The Dots The Star Gazers Way"	--	--	April 27, 2015
1952	#15-18	"Something's Moving Out There"	--	--	May 4, 2015
1953	#15-19	"Saturn, Simply the Best"	--	--	May 11, 2015
1954	#15-20	"The Wanderers"	--	--	May 18, 2015
1955	#15-21	"Venus, Venus, Burning Bright, First Star I See Tonight"	--	--	May 25, 2015
1956	#15-22	"Venus and the Super Duper Jupiter Conjunction"	--	--	June 1, 2015
1957	#15-23	"Day Star Day"	--	--	June 8, 2015
1958	#15-24	"What A Line Up!"	--	--	June 15, 2015
1959	#15-25	"The Evening Star Meets The King of Planets"	--	--	June 22, 2015
1960	#15-26	"Independence Day Constellation Fest"	--	--	June 29, 2015
1961	#15-27	"It's Zubeneschamali And Zubenelgenubi Time"	--	--	July 6, 2015
1962	#15-28	"Along The Milky Way"	--	--	July 13, 2015
1963	#15-29	"Measuring The Cosmos"	Erlin Morandeira	Bill Dishong, Dean Regas, James Albury	July 20, 2015
1964	#15-30	"Plan Now For The Perseid Meteor Shower"	--	--	July 27, 2015
1965	#15-31	"That's It! We're Off to Vega"	--	--	August 3, 2015
1966	#15-32	"From Virgo to Scorpius, The Moon Sure Gets Around"	--	--	August 10, 2015
1967	#15-33	"Yay! Winter's Back! Well, Almost"	--	--	August 17, 2015
1968	#15-34	"Sizing Up The Stars In The Summer Triangle"	--	--	August 24, 2015
1969	#15-35	"Star Hopping in the September Sky"	--	--	August 31, 2015
1970	#15-36	"Ta-Ta Tetrad"	--	--	September 7, 2015
1971	#15-37	"The False Dawn of Omar Khayyan"	--	--	September 14, 2015
1972	#15-38	"Super Moon, Harvest Moon, Lunar Eclipse"	--	--	September 21, 2015
1973	#15-39	"Cygnus The Spectacular Swan"	--	--	September 28, 2015
1974	#15-40	"Planets Before Sunrise"	--	--	October 5, 2015
1975	#15-41	"Solar System Samba!"	--	--	October 12, 2015
1976	#15-42	"Monsters in The Sky"	--	--	October 19, 2015
1977	#15-43	"Planetary Ping Pong"	--	--	October 26, 2015
1978	#15-44	"Two Frogs Hopping and Two Planets Wandering"	--	--	November 2, 2015
1979	#15-45	"Here Come the Leonids!"	--	--	November 9, 2015
1980	#15-46	"The Secret Lives of Stars"	--	--	November 16, 2015
1981	#15-47	"Celestial Shapes of the Season"	--	--	November 23, 2015
1982	#15-48	"Finding a Planet in the Daytime"	--	--	November 30, 2015
1983	#15-49	"Happy Winter Solstice"	--	--	December 7, 2015
1984	#15-50	"Orion in Perspective"	--	--	December 14, 2015
1985	#15-51	"Behold the New Year's Eve Star"	--	--	December 21, 2015
1986	#15-52	"Planets of the New Year"	--	--	December 28, 2015
