= Star Gazers (2018 season) =

- No. of episodes: 53

Release
- Original network: PBS
- Original release: January 1, 2018

Season chronology
- ← Previous (2017 season) Next → (2019 season)

The 2018 season of the astronomy TV show Star Gazers starring Dean Regas and James Albury started on January 1, 2018. The episodes from this season were listed as being a South Florida PBS WPBT original production and were copyrighted to South Florida PBS, Inc.

== 2018 season ==
| No. overall | No. in season | Title | Directed by | Written by | Original release date |
|---|---|---|---|---|---|
| 2090 | #18-01 | "Celestial Events of 2018" | -- | -- | January 1, 2018 |
| 2091 | #18-02 | "A Pair of a Pair of Planets" | -- | -- | January 8, 2018 |
| 2092 | #18-03 | "The Winter Football" | -- | -- | January 15, 2018 |
| 2093 | #18-04 | "Once in a Blue Moon Eclipse" | -- | -- | January 22, 2018 |
| 2094 | #18-05 | "Auriga!" | -- | -- | January 29, 2018 |
| 2095 | #18-06 | "Elvis in the Sky" | -- | -- | March 5, 2018 |
| 2096 | #18-07 | "Return of the Moon Joke Episode" | -- | -- | February 12, 2018 |
| 2097 | #18-08 | "Take The Venus - Mercury Challenge" | -- | -- | February 19, 2018 |
| 2098 | #18-09 | "Planets of the Morning" | -- | -- | February 26, 2018 |
| 2099 | #18-10 | "Canis Major and Canis Minor" | -- | -- | March 5, 2018 |
| 2100 | #18-11 | "Spring Has Sprung" | -- | -- | March 12, 2018 |
| 2101 | #18-12 | "Finding the North Star" | -- | -- | March 19, 2018 |
| 2102 | #18-13 | "Ophiuchus" | -- | -- | March 26, 2018 |
| 2103 | #18-14 | "Taurus and Gemini" | -- | -- | April 2, 2018 |
| 2104 | #18-15 | "The Second Planet from the Sun" | -- | -- | April 9, 2018 |
| 2105 | #18-16 | "Time Traveling with the Big Dipper" | -- | -- | April 16, 2018 |
| 2106 | #18-17 | "The Fifth Planet from the Sun!" | -- | -- | April 23, 2018 |
| 2107 | #18-18 | "The Brightest Planets" | -- | -- | April 30, 2018 |
| 2108 | #18-19 | "Virgo!" | -- | -- | May 7, 2018 |
| 2109 | #18-20 | "Hercules' Pet Cemetery" | -- | -- | May 14, 2018 |
| 2110 | #18-21 | "Astronomical Distances" | -- | -- | May 21, 2018 |
| 2111 | #18-22 | "Retrograde!" | -- | -- | May 28, 2018 |
| 2112 | #18-23 | "Happy Birthday Jack" | -- | -- | June 4, 2018 |
| 2113 | #18-24 | "Awesome Altair" | -- | -- | June 11, 2018 |
| 2114 | #18-25 | "The Sixth Planet from the Sun" | -- | -- | June 18, 2018 |
| 2115 | #18-26 | "Scanning the Sky with Binoculars" | -- | -- | June 25, 2018 |
| 2116 | #18-27 | "Visiting Mars" | -- | -- | July 2, 2018 |
| 2117 | #18-28 | "Moon Conjunction Junction" | -- | -- | July 9, 2018 |
| 2118 | #18-29 | "The Fourth Planet from the Sun" | -- | -- | July 16, 2018 |
| 2119 | #18-30 | "Stars for Every Season" | -- | -- | July 23, 2018 |
| 2120 | #18-31 | "Summer Meteor Shower" | -- | -- | July 30, 2018 |
| 2121 | #18-32 | "A Rainbow of Planets" | -- | -- | August 6, 2018 |
| 2122 | #18-33 | "Looking North and South This Summer" | -- | -- | August 13, 2018 |
| 2123 | #18-34 | "Delphinus the Dolphin" | -- | -- | August 20, 2018 |
| 2124 | #18-35 | "Let's Go Star Hopping" | -- | -- | August 27, 2018 |
| 2125 | #18-36 | "Follow the Wondering Moon" | -- | -- | September 3, 2018 |
| 2126 | #18-37 | "Lets Look at Lyra!" | -- | -- | September 10, 2018 |
| 2127 | #18-38 | "Shine on Harvest Moon" | -- | -- | September 17, 2018 |
| 2128 | #18-39 | "A Galactic Tea Party" | -- | -- | September 24, 2018 |
| 2129 | #18-40 | "Saying Hi to the Planets" | -- | -- | October 1, 2018 |
| 2130 | #18-41 | "Cepheus!" | -- | -- | October 8, 2018 |
| 2131 | #18-42 | "Monsters in the Sky" | -- | -- | October 15, 2018 |
| 2132 | #18-43 | "The Polygons of Autumn" | -- | -- | October 22, 2018 |
| 2133 | #18-44 | "The Goat, The Frog and Mars" | -- | -- | October 29, 2018 |
| 2134 | #18-45 | "Sunset Planets and The Return of the Morning Star" | -- | -- | November 5, 2018 |
| 2135 | #18-46 | "Where Did the Big Dipper Go?" | -- | -- | November 12, 2018 |
| 2136 | #18-47 | "The Pleiades and Their Cousins" | -- | -- | November 19, 2018 |
| 2137 | #18-48 | "Goodbye Summer Triangle, Hello Orion" | -- | -- | November 26, 2018 |
| 2138 | #18-49 | "Phase-Tastic (Part 1)" | -- | -- | December 3, 2018 |
| 2139 | #18-50 | "Sharing Stars" | -- | -- | December 10, 2018 |
| 2140 | #18-51 | "Phase-Tastic (Part 2)" | -- | -- | December 17, 2018 |
| 2141 | #18-52 | "Orion from a New Perspective" | -- | -- | December 24, 2018 |
| 2142 | #18-53 | "Looking Up in 2019" | -- | -- | December 31, 2018 |
