= Star Gazers (2012 season) =

- No. of episodes: 53

Release
- Original network: PBS
- Original release: January 2 – December 31, 2012

Season chronology
- ← Previous (2011 season) Next → (2013 season)

The 2012 season of the astronomy TV show Star Gazers starring Dean Regas, James Albury, and Marlene Hidalgo, started on January 2, 2012. The show's episode numbering scheme changed several times during its run to coincide with major events in the show's history. The official Star Gazers website hosts the complete scripts for each of the shows. After February 2012, the old jackstargazer.com website discontinued the practice of archiving its own copies of scripts from the show; and starting in July 2012, links to scripts from the jackstargazer.com website were directed to the "Episodes" page of the newer stargazersonline.org website.

== 2012 season ==
No. overall	No. in season	Title	Directed by	Written by	Original release date
1778	#12-01	"Friday The 13th Is Good Luck For Finding Planets"	--	--	January 2, 2012
1779	#12-02	"The Winter Football"	--	--	January 9, 2012
1780	#12-03	"Which Season Is the Longest?"	--	--	January 16, 2012
1781	#12-04	"The Orion Nebula : A True Winter Wonder"	--	--	January 23, 2012
1782	#12-05	"Let Orion And Venus Be Your Guide"	--	--	January 30, 2012
1783	#12-06	"Make This Valentine's Day Cosmic With A Gift Of Stars And Planets"	--	--	February 6, 2012
1784	#12-07	"The Brightest Of The Bright"	--	--	February 13, 2012
1785	#12-08	"How To Find The Gemini Twins And Their Sensational Siblings"	--	--	February 20, 2012
1786	#12-09	"Happy Leap Day"	--	--	February 27, 2012
1787	#12-10	"Planet, Planet Burning Bright"	--	--	March 5, 2012
1788	#12-11	"Star Colors"	--	Unknown	March 12, 2012
1789	#12-12	"Spring And A Crescent Moon"	--	--	March 19, 2012
1790	#12-13	"Low Lyin' Orion And The High Flyin' Lion"	--	--	March 26, 2012
1791	#12-14	"Going Retrograde With Venus And Mars"	--	--	April 2, 2012
1792	#12-15	"Venus In Transit"	--	--	April 9, 2012
1793	#12-16	"Astronomy Day Promises Plenty Of Planets"	--	--	April 16, 2012
1794	#12-17	"Time Traveling With The Big Dipper"	--	--	April 23, 2012
1795	#12-18	"Arc To Arcturus, Then Speed On To Saturn And Spica"	--	--	April 30, 2012
1796	#12-19	"Sunday Solar Eclipse For Some"	--	--	May 7, 2012
1797	#12-20	"Venus And Four Bright Stars In The Evening Sky"	--	--	May 14, 2012
1798	#12-21	"Triangles, Triangles"	--	--	May 21, 2012
1799	#12-22	"A Most Agreeable Spectacle : Venus Transits The Sun"	--	--	May 28, 2012
1800	#12-23	"Measuring The Cosmos"	--	--	June 4, 2012
1801	#12-24	"Join Us In Our Annual Day Star Day Celebration"	--	--	June 11, 2012
1802	#12-25	"What The Stars Look like For The First Days Of Summer"	--	--	June 18, 2012
1803	#12-26	"The Reasons For The Seasons"	--	--	June 25, 2012
1804	#12-27	"Circumpolar Vs. Seasonal Stars"	--	--	July 2, 2012
1805	#12-28	"The Dragon Vs. The Scorpion"	--	--	July 9, 2012
1806	#12-29	"It's Zubeneschamali And Zubenelgenubi Time"	--	--	July 16, 2012
1807	#12-30	"Transient Triangles And Orion Rises Once More"	--	--	July 23, 2012
1808	#12-31	"Altair : The Weird But Wonderful Star"	--	--	July 30, 2012
1809	#12-32	"How To Watch This Weekend's Perseid Meteor Shower"	--	--	August 6, 2012
1810	#12-33	"Two Planets At Night And Two Planets In The Morning"	--	--	August 13, 2012
1811	#12-34	"The Kitty Cat And The Scorpion : A Strange Tale Of A Tail"	--	--	August 20, 2012
1812	#12-35	"Viva Las Vega"	--	--	August 27, 2012
1813	#12-36	"Celestial Navigation With A Spoon And A W"	--	--	September 3, 2012
1814	#12-37	"The False Dawn Of Omar Khayyam"	--	--	September 10, 2012
1815	#12-38	"The Harvest Moon Illusion"	--	--	September 17, 2012
1816	#12-39	"Cygnus The Magnificent"	--	--	September 24, 2012
1817	#12-40	"The Planets Dance At Twilight And The Return Of The False Dawn"	--	--	October 1, 2012
1818	#12-41	"Heads And Tails Of The Sky"	--	--	October 8, 2012
1819	#12-42	"Ares Meets Antares And Hold Your Pinkie Over The Moon"	--	--	October 15, 2012
1820	#12-43	"Some Favorite Autumn Stars And Why The Stars Change With The Seasons"	--	--	October 22, 2012
1821	#12-44	"Cassiopeia, You're So Vain!"	--	--	October 29, 2012
1822	#12-45	"Two Frogs Hopping, Two Planets Wandering"	--	--	November 5, 2012
1823	#12-46	"Planet Show In The Morning Plus The Leonid Meteor Shower"	--	--	November 12, 2012
18204	#12-47	"Perseus And The Pleiades"	--	--	November 19, 2012
1825	#12-48	"The Surest Sign Of Winter And Why The Shortest Day Of The Year Doesn't Feel Right"	--	--	November 26, 2012
1826	#12-49	"Follow The Orbiting Moon"	--	--	December 3, 2012
1827	#12-50	"The Geminid Meteor Shower And Comets Are A Comin', Maybe"	--	--	December 10, 2012
1828	#12-51	"The Moon Of The Short Shadows"	--	--	December 17, 2010
1829	#12-52	"Celebrate New Year's Eve With A Sirius-ly Bright Star!"	--	--	December 24, 2012
1830	#12-53	"Four Cold Planets For January"	--	--	December 31, 2012
