= Star Gazers (2019 season) =

- No. of episodes: 52

Release
- Original network: PBS
- Original release: January 7, 2019

Season chronology
- ← Previous (2018 season) Next → (2020 season)

The 2019 season of the astronomy TV show Star Gazers starring Dean Regas and James Albury started on January 7, 2019. The last episode to feature Dean Regas and James Albury as hosts was aired during the week of November 25, 2019. The December 2019 episodes were produced only in the one-minute length format when production in the five-minute length format was discontinued. Trace Dominguez started hosting the program during the week of December 2, 2019. Episodes of the television series are released on the show's website at the start of the month, up to a month prior to any episode's broadcast date.

Two extra episodes (described as clips on part of the show's official website) were produced in addition to the 52 regular weekly televised episodes. These episodes tended to be longer than the weekly televised episodes; although, the durations of these episodes tended to vary from clip to clip. While the regular weekly episodes were designed to be presented during a specific week, the content of the extra episodes tended to focus on more general astronomical topics rather than on specific astronomical events which were occurring within a more limited time span, meaning that the extra episodes could be aired at any time during a longer time span. Two of these extra episodes were produced and released in pairs every month, using the same format which had been used for the discontinued five-minute format of the weekly television episodes.

== 2019 season ==
No. overall	No. in season	Title	Directed by	Written by	Original release date
2143	#19-01	"Which Night is the Lunar Eclipse?"	--	--	January 7, 2019
2144	#19-02	"Two Bears and Two Dogs"	--	--	January 14, 2019
2145	#19-03	"Planets in the Kitchen"	--	--	January 21, 2019
2146	#19-04	"The Orion Nebula"	--	--	January 28, 2019
2147	#19-05	"Sunrise Planet Fest!"	--	--	February 4, 2019
2148	#19-06	"Happy Birthday Galileo"	--	--	February 11, 2019
2149	#19-07	"Brightest of the Bright"	--	--	February 18, 2019
2150	#19-08	"The Orion Family Reunion"	--	--	February 25, 2019
2151	#19-09	"The Tipsy Moon"	--	--	March 4, 2019
2152	#19-10	"Return of the Vern"	--	--	March 11, 2019
2153	#19-11	"Colorful Stars"	--	--	March 18, 2019
2154	#19-12	"Ophi-who"	--	--	March 25, 2019
2155	#19-13	"Bootes"	--	--	April 1, 2019
2156	#19-14	"Follow the Arc to Arcturus"	--	--	April 8, 2019
2157	#19-15	"Lunar Leapfrog with Jupiter and Saturn"	--	--	April 15, 2019
2158	#19-16	"The Super Spring Triangle"	--	--	April 22, 2019
2159	#19-17	"Springtime Constellation Shootout"	--	--	April 29, 2019
2160	#19-18	"The Three Little C's of Spring"	--	--	May 6, 2019
2161	#19-19	"The Many Faces of the Big Dipper"	--	--	May 13, 2019
2162	#19-20	"The Many Sides of the Moon"	--	--	May 20, 2019
2163	#19-21	"Jupiter at Midnight"	--	--	May 27, 2019
2164	#19-22	"Opposing Jupiter"	--	--	June 3, 2019
2165	#19-23	"The "M" Planets"	--	--	June 10, 2019
2166	#19-24	"Vega, Altair, Deneb… Oh My!"	--	--	June 17, 2019
2167	#19-25	"The Sky on the 4th of July"	--	--	June 24, 2019
2168	#19-26	"Saturn at Opposition!"	--	--	July 1, 2019
2169	#19-27	"Measuring the Cosmos"	--	--	July 8, 2019
2170	#19-28	"Apollo 11 Mission to the Moon"	--	--	July 15, 2019
2171	#19-29	"Finding the Milky Way"	--	--	July 22, 2019
2172	#19-30	"The Fish Hook and the Scorpion"	--	--	July 29, 2019
2173	#19-31	"Weekend Between the Planets"	--	--	August 5, 2019
2174	#19-32	"The North vs. The South"	--	--	August 12, 2019
2175	#19-33	"Where Did All These Constellations Come From"	--	--	August 19, 2019
2176	#19-34	"Lunar Leapfrog: Part 2"	--	--	August 25, 2019
2177	#19-35	"Aquila the Eagle"	--	--	September 2, 2019
2178	#19-36	"Finding Direction in the Night Sky"	--	--	September 9, 2019
2179	#19-37	"Autmnul Equinox - It's Fall"	--	--	September 16, 2019
2180	#19-38	"A Flying Horse and Another Lunar Leapfrog"	--	--	September 23, 2019
2181	#19-39	"Perseus and the Seven Sisters"	--	--	September 30, 2019
2182	#19-40	"Transit Fever 2019!"	--	--	October 7, 2019
2183	#19-41	"Legends of the Fall"	--	--	October 14, 2019
2184	#19-42	"Can You Spot Venus?"	--	--	October 21, 2019
2185	#19-43	"Identified Flying Objects"	--	--	October 28, 2019
2186	#19-44	"The Transit of Mercury 2019!"	--	--	November 3, 2019
2187	#19-45	"The Disappearing Dipper"	--	--	November 10, 2019
2188	#19-46	"A Meeting of the Bright"	--	--	November 17, 2019
2189	#19-47	"Andromeda's Father!"	--	--	November 24, 2019
2190	#19-48	"Are You Out of Phase? - Part 1"	--	--	December 1, 2019
2191	#19-49	"Geminids Meteor Shower"	--	--	December 8, 2019
2192	#19-50	"Share These Stars"	--	--	December 15, 2019
2193	#19-51	"Finding Andromeda Part B"	--	--	December 22, 2019
2194	#19-52	"Phasers on Stunning"	--	--	December 29, 2019

== Evergreen Segments ==
No. overall	No. in season	Title	Directed by	Written by	Original release date
1	#EVERGREEN 001	"Andromeda Collision"	--	--	December 2019
2	#EVERGREEN 002	"Star Colors"	--	--	December 2019
