= The Sky Above Us with James Albury =

American astronomy television show

- Presented by: James C. Albury (2020–present)
- Country of origin: United States
- Original language: English
- No. of seasons: 4
- No. of episodes: 50

Production
- Production locations: Gainesville, Florida
- Camera setup: Green Screen
- Running time: 5 minutes

Original release
- Network: YouTube
- Release: February 26, 2020 – present

The Sky Above Us with James Albury is a short American astronomy show hosted by James Albury, director of the Kika Silva Pla Planetarium at Santa Fe College. Each episode is approximately five minutes in length; and, a new episode is released every two or three weeks. Prior to hosting this series, Albury had spent eight years co-hosting the PBS astronomy series, Star Gazers. The series is produced at Santa Fe College in Gainesville, Florida.

James Albury announced the launch of the astronomy series on his Facebook fan page. In a post dated January 16, 2020, Albury reported that the first episode, March of the Planets!, had been recorded earlier that same day. In that same post, Albury stated that the new series would debut during the last week of February in 2020. The first episode was released online on February 26, 2020.

== Content ==
The Sky Above Us is an educational series which describes upcoming celestial events. Although the show is aimed at the general public, it also contains information which might be of interest to experienced amateur astronomers. The program teaches viewers how to locate constellations and stars in the sky and presents interesting facts about celestial objects.

Due the quarantining efforts during the 2020 outbreak of the SARS-Cov2 virus, an animated version of James Albury was used for 7 episodes (2020-05 "So Long Comet Atlas" through 2020-12 "Center of the Galaxy").

In an April 19, 2020 post on the show's Facebook fan page, James Albury said that the show's theme song was Elastic Vibe from the album, Possible Light by Ziv Moran.

On April 1, 2021, as part of an 'April Fools' Day' prank, James Albury posted on the show's Facebook fan page a rant that he was giving up on Astronomy and changing sciences. He followed the rant with a link to the episode Karst! which focused on Geology, rather than the usual Astronomical topics.

== Episodes ==
No.	#	Title	Directed by	Written by	Original release date
1	#2020-01	"March of the Planets"	--	James C. Albury	February 26, 2020
2	#2020-02	"Planetary Buzz By"	--	James C. Albury	March 18, 2020
3	#2020-03	"Leo has Arrived"	--	James C. Albury	April 1, 2020
4	#2020-04	"Bye-bye Gemini"	--	James C. Albury	April 15, 2020
5	#2020-05	"So Long Comet ATLAS"	--	James C. Albury	May 6, 2020
6	#2020-06	"Venus, Vega and Vindemiatrix!"	--	James C. Albury	May 21, 2020
7	#2020-07	"Let's Go Planet Hunting!"	--	James C. Albury	June 3, 2020
8	#2020-08	"Season Reason"	--	James C. Albury	June 20, 2020
9	#2020-09	"The Morning Star!"	--	James C. Albury	July 2, 2020
10	#2020-10	"Comet NEOWISE"	--	James C. Albury	July 18, 2020
11	#2020-11	"Moons, Mars and Meteors!"	--	James C. Albury	August 8, 2020
12	#2020-12	"The Center of the Galaxy"	--	James C. Albury	August 25, 2020
13	#2020-13	"The Two Horses"	--	James C. Albury	September 14, 2020
14	#2020-14	"Martian Opposition"	--	James C. Albury	October 1, 2020
15	#2020-15	"The Blue Pumpkin Moon"	--	James C. Albury	October 14, 2020
16	#2020-16	"The Leonid Meteor Shower"	--	James C. Albury	October 30, 2020
17	#2020-17	"The Return of Orion"	--	James C. Albury	November 20, 2020
18	#2020-18	"The Great Conjunction of 2020"	--	James C. Albury	December 2, 2020
19	#2021-01	"Happy 2021"	--	James C. Albury	January 1, 2021
20	#2021-02	"Mercury and Mars"	--	James C. Albury	January 15, 2021
21	#2021-03	"Follow the Drinking Gourd"	--	James C. Albury	February 15, 2021
22	#2021-04	"Planetary Spring Fling!"	--	James C. Albury	March 1, 2021
23	#2021-05	"Leo the Lion"	--	James C. Albury	March 15, 2021
24	#2021-06	"Karst!"	--	James C. Albury	April 1, 2021
25	#2021-07	"The Moon, Mars and Meteors: Part 2"	--	James C. Albury	April 2, 2021
26	#2021-08	"The Red Flower Super Moon 2021"	--	James C. Albury	April 30, 2021
27	#2021-09	"Solstice"	--	James C. Albury	June 16, 2021
28	#2021-10	"When Love and War Meet"	--	James C. Albury	July 12, 2021
29	#082021-001	"Astronomy Apps for your Android Smartphone"	--	James C. Albury	August 9, 2021
30	#2021-11	"The Northern Crown"	--	James C. Albury	August 27, 2021
31	#2021-11a	"September 12–19, 2021"	--	James C. Albury	September 12, 2021
32	#2021-12	"The Stars of Star Trek"	--	James C. Albury	October 7, 2021
33	#2021-12a	"Planet Moon Triangle"	--	James C. Albury	October 14, 2021
34	#2021-13	"Shadow Dancer"	--	James C. Albury	November 3, 2021
35	#2021-14	"Mars, the Moon, and Antares"	--	James C. Albury	December 21, 2021
36	#2022-01	"Happy 2022!"	--	James C. Albury	January 1, 2022
37	#2022-02	"Benjamin Banneker"	--	James C. Albury	February 1, 2022
38	#2022-BTS	"Behind the Scenes"	--	James C. Albury	March 24, 2022
39	#2022-04	"Meeting of the Planets (Part 1)"	--	James C. Albury	April 3, 2022
40	#2022-05	"Meeting of the Planets (Part 2)"	--	James C. Albury	April 26, 2022
41	#2022-06	"The Night of the Red Moon"	--	James C. Albury	May 4, 2022
42	#2022-07	"Jupiter, Mars and the Tau Herculids"	--	James C. Albury	May 28, 2022
43	#2022-08	"Day Star Day"	--	James C. Albury	June 18, 2022
44	#2022-03	"The Tale of Two Doggies"	--	James C. Albury	August 1, 2022
45	#2022-09	"Jupiter at Opposition"	--	James C. Albury	September 1, 2022
46	#2022-10	"The Last Eclipse"	--	James C. Albury	October 15, 2022
47	#2023-01	"Happy 2023!"	--	James C. Albury	January 1, 2023
48	#2023-02	"Comet, Conjunction and Occultation Fever"	--	James C. Albury	January 15, 2023
49	#2023-03	"The Star of the Pharaoh"	--	James C. Albury	February 5, 2023
50	#2023-04	"Venus and Jupiter 2023"	--	James C. Albury	February 16, 2023

== Audio Podcast ==
In addition to the short online television episodes, James Albury and Professor Andy Sheppard also cohosted a series of The Sky Above Us audio podcasts. Each episode of the audio podcast series was approximately half an hour in length.

No.	#	Title	Directed by	Written by	Original release date
1	#2020-01	"Genesis"	--	Unknown	September 20, 2020
2	#2020-02	"Martian Opposition"	--	Unknown	October 10, 2020
3	#2020-03	"Glowing Europa"	--	Unknown	November 11, 2020

== See also ==
- Looking Up with Dean Regas and Anna Hehman, a twice per month podcast on astronomy and space
- The Sky at Night, a monthly television show on astronomy produced by the BBC
- SkyWeek, a weekly television show on astronomy
- Star Gazers, a weekly television show on astronomy
- StarDate (radio), a daily syndicated radio show highlighting upcoming celestial events
- White House Astronomy Night
