= Jack Horkheimer: Star Hustler (1990 season) =

- No. of episodes: 53

Release
- Original network: PBS
- Original release: January 1 – December 31, 1990

Season chronology
- ← Previous (1989 season) Next → (1991 season)

The 1990 season of the astronomy TV show Jack Horkheimer: Star Hustler starring Jack Horkheimer started on January 1, 1990. During this season, the show still had its original name, Jack Horkheimer: Star Hustler. Over the course of its broadcast, the episode numbering system was revised multiple times to align with significant milestones in the show's evolution. The official Star Gazer website provides access to the full scripts for each episode.

== 1990 season ==
| No. overall | No. in season | Title | Directed by | Written by | Original release date |
|---|---|---|---|---|---|
| 630 | # | "--" | -- | Jack Horkheimer | January 1, 1990 |
| 631 | # | "--" | -- | Jack Horkheimer | January 8, 1990 |
| 632 | # | "--" | -- | Jack Horkheimer | January 15, 1990 |
| 633 | # | "--" | -- | Jack Horkheimer | January 22, 1990 |
| 634 | # | "--" | -- | Jack Horkheimer | January 29, 1990 |
| 635 | # | "--" | -- | Jack Horkheimer | February 5, 1990 |
| 636 | # | "--" | -- | Jack Horkheimer | February 12, 1990 |
| 637 | # | "--" | -- | Jack Horkheimer | February 19, 1990 |
| 638 | # | "--" | -- | Jack Horkheimer | February 26, 1990 |
| 639 | # | "--" | -- | Jack Horkheimer | March 5, 1990 |
| 640 | # | "--" | -- | Jack Horkheimer | March 12, 1990 |
| 641 | # | "--" | -- | Jack Horkheimer | March 19, 1990 |
| 642 | # | "--" | -- | Jack Horkheimer | March 26, 1990 |
| 643 | # | "--" | -- | Jack Horkheimer | April 2, 1990 |
| 644 | # | "--" | -- | Jack Horkheimer | April 9, 1990 |
| 645 | # | "--" | -- | Jack Horkheimer | April 16, 1990 |
| 646 | # | "--" | -- | Jack Horkheimer | April 23, 1990 |
| 647 | # | "--" | -- | Jack Horkheimer | April 30, 1990 |
| 648 | # | "--" | -- | Jack Horkheimer | May 7, 1990 |
| 649 | # | "--" | -- | Jack Horkheimer | May 14, 1990 |
| 650 | # | "--" | -- | Jack Horkheimer | May 21, 1990 |
| 651 | # | "--" | -- | Jack Horkheimer | May 28, 1990 |
| 652 | # | "--" | -- | Jack Horkheimer | June 4, 1990 |
| 653 | # | "--" | -- | Jack Horkheimer | June 11, 1990 |
| 654 | # | "--" | -- | Jack Horkheimer | June 18, 1990 |
| 655 | # | "--" | -- | Jack Horkheimer | June 25, 1990 |
| 656 | # | "--" | -- | Jack Horkheimer | July 2, 1990 |
| 657 | # | "--" | -- | Jack Horkheimer | July 9, 1990 |
| 658 | # | "--" | -- | Jack Horkheimer | July 16, 1990 |
| 659 | # | "--" | -- | Jack Horkheimer | July 23, 1990 |
| 660 | # | "--" | -- | Jack Horkheimer | July 30, 1990 |
| 661 | # | "--" | -- | Jack Horkheimer | August 6, 1990 |
| 662 | # | "--" | -- | Jack Horkheimer | August 13, 1990 |
| 663 | # | "Yes Virginia, There Really Is a Milky Way!" | David Mullins | Jack Horkheimer | August 20, 1990 |
| 664 | # | "--" | -- | Jack Horkheimer | August 27, 1990 |
| 665 | # | "--" | -- | Jack Horkheimer | September 3, 1990 |
| 666 | # | "--" | -- | Jack Horkheimer | September 10, 1990 |
| 667 | # | "--" | -- | Jack Horkheimer | September 17, 1990 |
| 668 | # | "--" | -- | Jack Horkheimer | September 24, 1990 |
| 669 | # | "--" | -- | Jack Horkheimer | October 1, 1990 |
| 670 | # | "--" | -- | Jack Horkheimer | October 8, 1990 |
| 671 | # | "--" | -- | Jack Horkheimer | October 15, 1990 |
| 672 | # | "--" | -- | Jack Horkheimer | October 22, 1990 |
| 673 | # | "--" | -- | Jack Horkheimer | October 29, 1990 |
| 674 | # | "--" | -- | Jack Horkheimer | November 5, 1990 |
| 675 | # | "Super Mars Alert! And the Biennial Race of the Planets" | -- | Jack Horkheimer | November 12, 1990 |
| 676 | # | "--" | -- | Jack Horkheimer | November 19, 1990 |
| 677 | # | "An Incredible Martian Thrill Ride" | -- | Jack Horkheimer | November 26, 1990 |
| 678 | # | ""Star Hustler's" Meteor Shower Pick of the Year" | David Mullins | Jack Horkheimer | December 3, 1990 |
| 679 | # | "--" | -- | Jack Horkheimer | December 10, 1990 |
| 680 | # | "--" | -- | Jack Horkheimer | December 17, 1990 |
| 681 | # | "--" | -- | Jack Horkheimer | December 24, 1990 |
| 682 | # | "--" | -- | Jack Horkheimer | December 31, 1990 |
