= Jack Horkheimer: Star Hustler (1991 season) =

- No. of episodes: 52

Release
- Original network: PBS
- Original release: January 7 – December 30, 1991

Season chronology
- ← Previous (1990 season) Next → (1992 season)

The 1991 season of the astronomy TV show Jack Horkheimer: Star Hustler starring Jack Horkheimer started on January 7, 1991. During this season, the show still had its original name, Jack Horkheimer: Star Hustler. The show's episode numbering scheme changed several times during its run to coincide with major events in the show's history. The official Star Gazer website hosts the complete scripts for each of the shows.

== 1991 season ==
No. overall	No. in season	Title	Directed by	Written by	Original release date
683	#	"--"	--	Jack Horkheimer	January 7, 1991
684	#	"--"	--	Jack Horkheimer	January 14, 1991
685	#	"--"	--	Jack Horkheimer	January 21, 1991
686	#	"--"	--	Jack Horkheimer	January 28, 1991
687	#	"--"	--	Jack Horkheimer	February 4, 1991
688	#	"A Martian Journey from the Seven Sisters to the King and How to Get Your Free 1991 Sky Guide"	--	Jack Horkheimer	February 11, 1991
689	#	"How to Find Directions, If You're Lost, Using the Stars"	David Mullins	Jack Horkheimer	February 18, 1991
690	#	"--"	--	Jack Horkheimer	February 25, 1991
691	#	"--"	--	Jack Horkheimer	March 4, 1991
692	#	"--"	--	Jack Horkheimer	March 11, 1991
693	#	"--"	--	Jack Horkheimer	March 18, 1991
694	#	"--"	--	Jack Horkheimer	March 25, 1991
695	#	"--"	--	Jack Horkheimer	April 1, 1991
696	#	"--"	--	Jack Horkheimer	April 8, 1991
697	#	"--"	--	Jack Horkheimer	April 15, 1991
698	#	"--"	--	Jack Horkheimer	April 22, 1991
699	#	"--"	--	Jack Horkheimer	April 29, 1991
700	#	"--"	--	Jack Horkheimer	May 6, 1991
701	#	"--"	--	Jack Horkheimer	May 13, 1991
702	#	"--"	--	Jack Horkheimer	May 20, 1991
703	#	"--"	--	Jack Horkheimer	May 27, 1991
704	#	"--"	--	Jack Horkheimer	June 3, 1991
705	#	"SUPERWEEK 1991: 5 Sensational Nights of Sky Wonders"	--	Jack Horkheimer	June 10, 1991
706	#	"--"	--	Jack Horkheimer	June 17, 1991
707	#	"--"	--	Jack Horkheimer	June 24, 1991
708	#	"--"	--	Jack Horkheimer	July 1, 1991
709	#	"--"	--	Jack Horkheimer	July 8, 1991
710	#	"--"	--	Jack Horkheimer	July 15, 1991
711	#	"--"	--	Jack Horkheimer	July 22, 1991
712	#	"--"	--	Jack Horkheimer	July 29, 1991
713	#	"Don't Forget the Perseids, and August's Incredible Milky Way"	--	Jack Horkheimer	August 5, 1991
714	#	"--"	--	Jack Horkheimer	August 12, 1991
715	#	"--"	--	Jack Horkheimer	August 19, 1991
716	#	"--"	--	Jack Horkheimer	August 26, 1991
717	#	"The King, The Lion Hearted, and Speedy Gonzalez"	--	Jack Horkheimer	September 2, 1991
718	#	"From Sagittarius to Saturn on a Waxing Gibbous Moon"	--	Jack Horkheimer	September 9, 1991
719	#	"--"	--	Jack Horkheimer	September 16, 1991
720	#	"Brightest IFO of the Year; and How to Find a Planet in the Daytime"	--	Jack Horkheimer	September 23, 1991
721	#	"--"	--	Jack Horkheimer	September 30, 1991
722	#	"Will the Star of Bethlehem Reappear Next Week?"	--	Jack Horkheimer	October 7, 1991
723	#	"When the King and Queen Meet, and Hunt For the Hunter's Moon"	--	Jack Horkheimer	October 14, 1991
724	#	"--"	--	Jack Horkheimer	October 21, 1991
725	#	"--"	--	Jack Horkheimer	October 28, 1991
726	#	"--"	--	Jack Horkheimer	November 4, 1991
727	#	"--"	--	Jack Horkheimer	November 11, 1991
728	#	"--"	--	Jack Horkheimer	November 18, 1991
729	#	"--"	--	Jack Horkheimer	November 25, 1991
730	#	"--"	--	Jack Horkheimer	December 2, 1991
731	#	"The Eclipse of the Long Night Moon"	--	Jack Horkheimer	December 9, 1991
732	#	"--"	--	Jack Horkheimer	December 16, 1991
733	#	"--"	--	Jack Horkheimer	December 23, 1991
734	#	"--"	--	Jack Horkheimer	December 30, 1991
