= Peter B. Lawrence =

British astronomer

Pete Lawrence
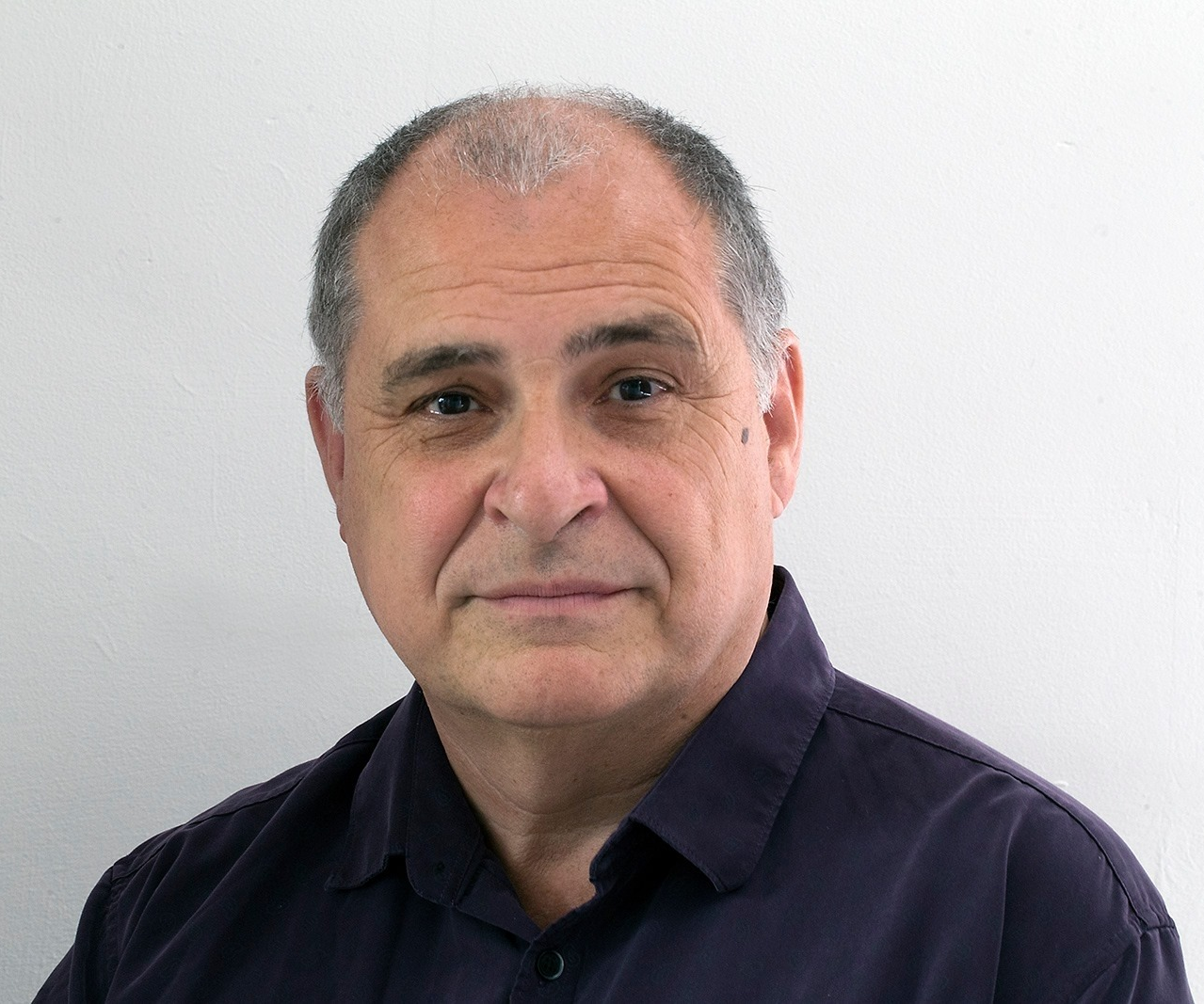
- Education: University of Leicester
- Known for: The Sky at Night
- Scientific career
- Fields: Astronomy

Peter B. Lawrence is a British amateur astronomer. Since 2004, he has been a presenter on the BBC's The Sky at Night. He makes high resolution images of the Sun, Moon and planets, and takes images of time-limited phenomena such as eclipses and the aurora.

== Biography ==
Lawrence first became interested in astronomy when he was a small boy, around the time of the Apollo Moon landings. His parents bought him a 40mm refractor telescope and very soon, after hunting down the planet Saturn with it, he was hooked. He used a copy of the Times Night Sky to locate Saturn and now supplies the monthly chart for the same guide.

After gaining a degree in astrophysics from the University of Leicester, Lawrence moved into software development and was the director of a computer software company called Data Graphic Applications Limited for many years.

Many of Lawrence's images have been published in magazines, books and on the internet. He has had more than 200 images published on spaceweather.com, as well as having numerous Astronomy Picture of the Day entries published.

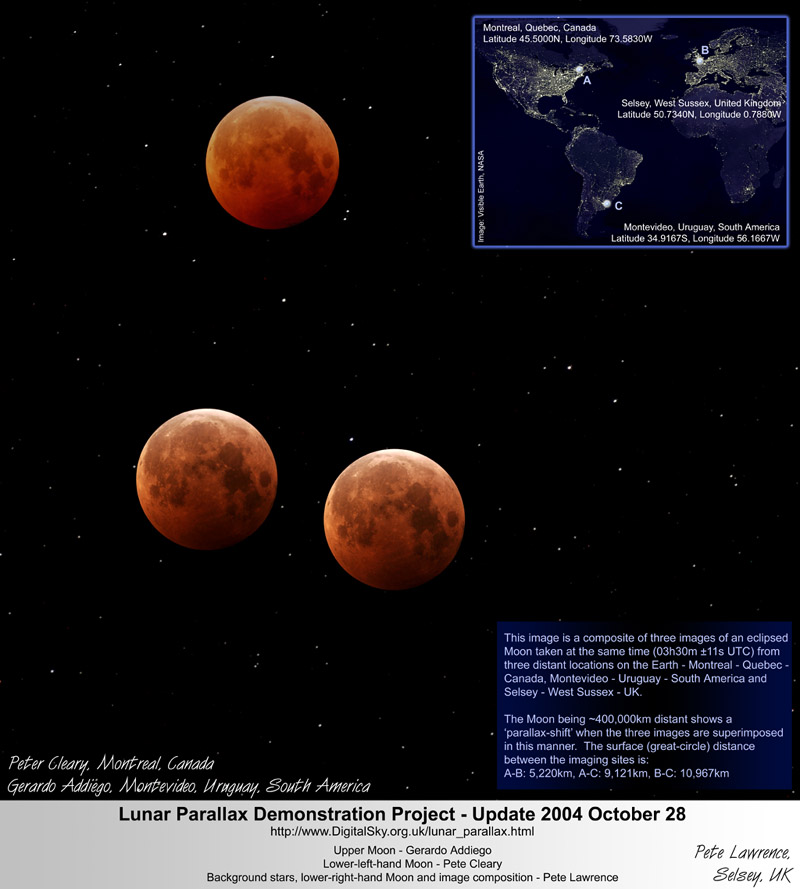
Parallax view of three simultaneously imaged Moons from three separate locations on Earth. A collaborative effort between Pete Lawrence in the UK, Pete Cleary in Canada and Gerrado Addiego in Uruguay.

Some of Lawrence's images show astronomical events and phenomena in unusual ways. Examples included the Lunar Parallax Demonstration Project and a capture of the shadow cast by the planet Venus.

Lawrence joined the BBC's The Sky at Night presenting team in 2004, and continues to present the practical observing section of the program to this day. He promotes practical astronomy and provides the monthly Sky Guide for the Sky at Night Magazine. He provided astronomical consultancy for the BBC Wonders of the Solar System and acted as astronomical consultant for the BBC Stargazing Live series aired in early January 2011. He wrote or contributed to much of the downloadable support material for the show. He was also the astronomical consultant for the BBC Radio 4 series, The Archers, assisting in checking the script for Phil Archer's character when he took up astronomy.

In 2017, Lawrence was the captain of the Leicester University alumni team in that year's Christmas series of University Challenge.

Originally observing from his home in Selsey, West Sussex, Lawrence moved to Thornton in Leicestershire in 2019. He writes and illustrates astronomical topics for a number of publications. He has produced the Night Sky guide for the Daily Telegraph newspaper for many years. He also acts as a guide on trips to see the aurora borealis and solar eclipses.

High frame rate video of Baily's Beads imaged by Pete Lawrence

== Academic background ==
Lawrence graduated from the University of Leicester with an honours degree in physics with astrophysics.

== Awards ==
Lawrence was awarded the Royal Photographic Society's Davis Medal in 2014, a limited (only 18 were ever awarded) medal for services in the field of digital imaging.
