= 8815 Deanregas =

Main-belt asteroid

Discovery
- Discovered by: H. Debehogne
- Discovery site: La Silla Obs.
- Discovery date: 23 February 1984

Designations
- Named after: Dean Regas (American astronomer)
- Alternative designations: 1984 DR · 1969 VX_{1} 1994 AN_{1}
- Minor planet category: main-belt · (inner); Flora

Orbital characteristics
- Epoch 23 March 2018 (JD 2458200.5)
- Uncertainty parameter 0
- Observation arc: 48.52 yr (17,723 d)
- Aphelion: 2.5619 AU
- Perihelion: 1.9434 AU
- Semi-major axis: 2.2527 AU
- Eccentricity: 0.1373
- Orbital period (sidereal): 3.38 yr (1,235 d)
- Mean anomaly: 89.021°
- Mean motion: 0° 17^{m} 29.4^{s} / day
- Inclination: 5.7963°
- Longitude of ascending node: 141.32°
- Argument of perihelion: 291.38°

Physical characteristics
- Mean diameter: 4.527±0.126
- Geometric albedo: 0.285±0.049
- Absolute magnitude (H): 13.9

8815 Deanregas, provisional designation 1984 DR, is a Florian asteroid from the inner regions of the asteroid belt, approximately 4.5 kilometers (2.8 miles) in diameter. It was discovered on 23 February 1984, by Belgian astronomer Henri Debehogne at ESO's La Silla Observatory in northern Chile. The asteroid was named for American astronomer Dean Regas.

== Orbit and classification ==
Deanregas is a member of the Flora family, one of the largest asteroid clans of stony asteroid groupings. It orbits the Sun in the inner main-belt at a distance of 1.9–2.6 AU once every 3 years and 5 months (1,235 days). Its orbit has an eccentricity of 0.14 and an inclination of 6° with respect to the ecliptic. It was first observed as 1969 VX_{1} at Crimea–Nauchnij in 1969, extending the body's observation arc by 15 years prior to its official discovery observation.

== Physical characteristics ==
According to the survey carried out by NASA's Wide-field Infrared Survey Explorer with its subsequent NEOWISE mission, Deanregas measures 4.527 kilometers in diameter and its surface has an albedo of 0.285. As of 2017, Deanregas' spectral type, as well as its rotation period and shape remain unknown.

== Naming ==
This minor planet was named for Dean Regas (born 1973), an astronomer at Cincinnati Observatory, responsible for science outreach activities and a national popularizer of astronomy. He is also a co-host of the prolific PBS show Star Gazers and author of Facts From Space. The approved naming citation was suggested by Fred N. Bowman and published by the Minor Planet Center on 5 January 2015 (M.P.C. 91790).
