= SkyWeek =

American astronomy TV program (2011-2014)

- Genre: Astronomy; Educational
- Starring: Tony Flanders
- Country of origin: United States
- Original language: English
- No. of seasons: 4
- No. of episodes: 52 episodes annually

Production
- Camera setup: Green screen
- Running time: 3 minutes

Original release
- Network: PBS
- Release: October 19, 2011 – April 28, 2014

SkyWeek was a weekly astronomy television program created by Sky & Telescope magazine. The show was hosted by Tony Flanders, associate editor of Sky & Telescope magazine. Each episode of the program was released in one, three, and five-minute formats; and, the show's content and format were similar to that of another weekly astronomy program called Star Gazers. SkyWeek was carried by many PBS affiliates.

== Content ==
SkyWeek was an educational program that described celestial events for the upcoming week. The show was aimed primarily at the general public and required no prior knowledge of astronomy. However, it also contained information that was likely to be interesting to experienced amateur astronomers. It depicted celestial objects in the night sky that could be seen without special equipment such as telescopes. Sky and Telescope's associate editor, Tony Flanders hosted the show, which was available in one-, three- and five-minute versions.

== Production ==
SkyWeek was produced by New Track Media, which publishes Sky & Telescope magazine. The show was distributed to PBS stations through American Public Television.

Images from the Hubble Space Telescope and many other professional and amateur sources were used in the production of the show.

On April 16, 2014, Tony Flanders announced that the episode covering the week of April 28 to May 4, 2014, would be the last for the series. Flanders reported that the series was being discontinued because of insufficient money from sponsors required to cover the show's costs.

== Episodes ==
Episodes were titled by the week of the events they describe. The production code used was of the form YYMMDD (2 digit year, 2 digit month, 2 digit day) for the date the episode was best suited to be broadcast.

=== Season 1: 2011 ===
The show premiered on November 19, 2011, with the inaugural episode covering the week of November 21 to 27, 2011.

No. overall	No. in season	Title	View Episodes	Original release date	Prod. code
1	1	"SkyWeek November 21–27, 2011"	view	November 20, 2011	#111120
Thanksgiving week is new Moon week, allowing what might be our last good view of the summer Milky Way. Also, let’s take a look at Venus and Jupiter, the two brightest planets.
2	2	"SkyWeek November 28 - December 4, 2011"	view	November 27, 2011	#111127
As the Moon waxes to half lit, let’s take a look at the brightest star in each section of the sky: Vega setting in the west, Fomalhaut cruising low over the southern horizon, and Capella rising in the east.
3	3	"SkyWeek December 5–11, 2011"	view	December 4, 2011	#111204
This week the Moon puts on the best sky show of the year for stargazers in the western U.S. — a total lunar eclipse. And we’ll look at Jupiter, the king of the planets.
4	4	"SkyWeek December 12–18, 2011"	view	December 11, 2011	#111211
This week boasts one of the year’s best meteor showers — though the nearly full Moon will interfere with viewing them. And we’ll look at a constellation that flies upside-down in the sky.
5	5	"SkyWeek December 19–25, 2011"	view	December 18, 2011	#111218
Wednesday December 21st is the longest night of the year and the beginning of winter in the Northern Hemisphere. Leading the pack of winter constellations is Taurus, the Bull.
6	6	"SkyWeek December 26 - January 1, 2012"	view	December 25, 2011	#111225
Orion, the Hunter, may be the most amazing constellation in the sky. And Betelgeuse, the star marking Orion’s left shoulder, is a red supergiant that’s ripe to explode as a supernova.

=== Season 2: 2012 ===
The 2012 season started on January 1, 2012.

No. overall	No. in season	Title	View Episodes	Original release date	Prod. code
7	1	"SkyWeek January 2–8, 2012"	view	January 1, 2012	#120101
Weather permitting, North Americans can enjoy a little-known but unusually strong meteor shower before dawn on Wednesday morning.
8	2	"SkyWeek January 9–15, 2012"	view	January 8, 2012	#120108
Sirius, the night sky’s brightest star, is on great display during January evenings.
9	3	"SkyWeek January 16–22, 2012"	view	January 15, 2012	#120115
The constellations Perseus, Cassiopeia, and Andromeda are linked together in the sky, and in Greek mythology.
10	4	"SkyWeek January 23–29, 2012"	view	January 22, 2012	#120122
Learn how Perseus rescued Andromeda, and find out how and why Queen Cassiopeia is doomed to rotate forever in the sky.
11	5	"SkyWeek January 30 - February 5, 2012"	view	January 29, 2012	#120129
This week Eros, the grandaddy of all near-Earth asteroids, is making its closest approach to Earth since 1975, just 16.6 million miles away. That make it our second-closest neighbor after the Moon.
12	6	"SkyWeek February 6–12, 2012"	view	February 5, 2012	#120205
Mars, the Red Planet, is beginning to appear in the evening sky. In many ways, Mars is the planet most like Earth, with deserts, dust storms, and maybe even running water on rare occasions.
13	7	"SkyWeek February 13–19, 2012"	view	February 12, 2012	#120212
Orion is center stage in the south as the sky grows dark. This constellation contains 7 of the sky’s 100 brightest stars. And most of Orion’s main stars are physically related.
14	8	"SkyWeek February 20–26, 2012"	view	February 19, 2012	#120219
The waxing crescent Moon passes close to three planets this week: Mercury, Venus, and Jupiter. All of them travel along a path in the sky called the zodiac.
15	9	"SkyWeek February 27 - March 4, 2012"	view	February 26, 2012	#120226
This week the night sky’s six or seven brightest objects are all visible 45 minutes after sunset, something that won’t happen again for decades.
16	10	"SkyWeek March 5–11, 2012"	view	March 4, 2012	#120304
This is a dramatic week for planet watchers. In the east, Mars is at its brightest and closest to Earth for 2012. On the opposite side of the sky, Venus and Jupiter form a spectacular pair.
17	11	"SkyWeek March 12–18, 2012"	view	March 11, 2012	#120311
Venus and Jupiter are paired spectacularly in the western sky. Meanwhile, the twin stars Castor and Pollux form a less glamorous but much longer lived pair high in the south.
18	12	"SkyWeek March 19–25, 2012"	view	March 18, 2012	#120318
Spring starts this week on Monday night, a date called the Vernal Equinox. For the next six months, days will be longer than nights in the Northern Hemisphere.
19	13	"SkyWeek March 26 - April 1, 2012"	view	March 25, 2012	#120325
The Big Dipper, the best-known star pattern in the sky is now high in the northeast in the evening. It’s just part of the much larger constellation Ursa Major.
20	14	"SkyWeek April 2–8, 2012"	view	April 1, 2012	#120401
Venus passes through the Pleiades star cluster on Monday and Tuesday. And Saturn, the magnificent ringed planet, is now well up in the evening sky.
21	15	"SkyWeek April 9–15, 2012"	view	April 8, 2012	#120408
You can see five great star clusters with your unaided eyes on evenings at this time of year. One of them is widely known, but rarely recognized as a true star cluster.
22	16	"SkyWeek April 16–22, 2012"	view	April 15, 2012	#120415
Corona Borealis, the Northern Crown, is a compact jewel of a constellation. And the dazzling orange star Arcturus nearby may be a visitor from another galaxy.
23	17	"SkyWeek April 23–29, 2012"	view	April 22, 2012	#120422
The waxing crescent Moon appears higher in the west each evening this week. And the planet Venus is also now a crescent, a phenomenon of great historical importance.
24	18	"SkyWeek April 30 - May 6, 2012"	view	April 29, 2012	#120429
The closest and biggest full Moon of 2012 happens on Saturday, May 5th. That means that high tides will be unusually high and low tides will be unusually low.
25	19	"SkyWeek May 7–13, 2012"	view	May 6, 2012	#120506
Venus, Mars, and Saturn are all paired with bright stars this week. Saturn is in Virgo, the great constellation of spring, and the site of a remarkable galaxy cluster.
26	20	"SkyWeek May 14–20, 2012"	view	May 13, 2012	#120513
A partial solar eclipse is visible over most of the U.S. on Sunday, May 20th. And in parts of the West the eclipse is annular, with a ring of sunlight all around the Moon’s dark disk.
27	21	"SkyWeek May 21–27, 2012"	view	May 20, 2012	#120520
This week is your last easy chance to see Venus before it crosses the Sun’s disk on June 5th. And the constellation Hercules, with its magnificent star cluster, is rising in the east.
28	22	"SkyWeek May 28 - June 3, 2012"	view	May 27, 2012	#120527
Get ready for the partial lunar eclipse before dawn on June 4th and the twice-in-a-lifetime chance to see Venus’s dark disk cross the Sun on June 5th.
29	23	"SkyWeek June 4–10, 2012"	view	June 3, 2012	
The Moon experiences a partial lunar eclipse before dawn on Monday. And we look at the historical and scientific importance of Tuesday’s Transit of Venus across the Sun.
30	24	"SkyWeek June 11–17, 2012"	view	June 10, 2012	
The huge intertwined constellations Ophiuchus and Serpens fill much of the southeastern sky. Ophiuchus is sometimes called the thirteenth constellation of the zodiac.
31	25	"SkyWeek June 18–24, 2012"	view	June 17, 2012	
Summer officially begins on Wednesday this week. In addition to having the longest days, this time of year has the most luxurious sunrises, sunsets, and twilights.
32	26	"SkyWeek June 25 - July 1, 2012"	view	June 24, 2012	
The waxing Moon passes Mars, Spica, and Saturn this week. Saturn possesses an extraordinary retinue of moons, including the amazingly Earth-like moon Titan.
33	27	"SkyWeek July 2–8, 2012"	view	July 1, 2012	
Vega, Altair, and Deneb, the three bright high-flying stars of summer, are now well up in the east. Together, they form a huge shape called the Summer Triangle.
34	28	"SkyWeek July 9–15, 2012"	view	July 8, 2012	
Magnificent Scorpius, the Scorpion, is at its highest around 10 or 11 pm. Its brightest star is dazzling reddish Antares, meaning "rival of Mars."
35	29	"SkyWeek July 16–22, 2012"	view	July 15, 2012	
Summer evenings are when the Milky Way’s brightest part is visible. Unfortunately, the Milky Way is easily overwhelmed by poorly designed artificial lights.
36	30	"SkyWeek July 23–29, 2012"	view	July 22, 2012	
Vega and Altair, the brightest stars of the Summer Triangle, are linked in legends worldwide. And their names tell a fascinating story.
37	31	"SkyWeek July 30 - August 5, 2012"	view	July 29, 2012	
Mars approaches Saturn and Spica dramatically this week at dusk. And the Day Star, the Sun, is a never-ending source of astronomical wonder.
38	32	"SkyWeek August 6–12, 2012"	view	August 5, 2012	
Mars, Saturn, and Spica form a triangle low in the southwest. And the Perseid meteor shower will be at its best late on Saturday night.
39	33	"SkyWeek August 13–19, 2012"	view	August 12, 2012	
Mars threads the narrow gap between Saturn and Spica. And later in the evening we can look deep into the heart of the Sagittarius Milky Way.
40	34	"SkyWeek August 20–26, 2012"	view	August 19, 2012	
Between and below Cygnus the Dolphin and Aquila the Eagle lie two tiny but very attractive constellations: Delphinus the Dolphin and Sagitta the Arrow.
41	35	"SkyWeek August 27 - September 2, 2012"	view	August 26, 2012	
The Moon is more than one-quarter the diameter of Earth. The only comparable pair in the Solar System is Pluto and its moon Charon.
42	36	"SkyWeek September 3–9, 2012"	view	September 2, 2012	
The small but shapely constellation Lyra is chock-full of celestial wonders. In Greek mythology this Lyre belonged to the great musician Orpheus.
43	37	"SkyWeek September 10–16, 2012"	view	September 9, 2012	
Cygnus the Swan flies high overhead. The Great Rift that splits the Milky Way in two starts near the heart of Cygnus.
44	38	"SkyWeek September 17–23, 2012"	view	September 16, 2012	
The planet Uranus is extraordinarily close to a similarly bright star. Uranus was discovered in 1781 by an amateur astronomer named William Herschel.
45	39	"SkyWeek September 24–30, 2012"	view	September 23, 2012	
The elegant but little-known constellation Draco the Dragon lies coiled around the Little Dipper, with its head high in the sky.
46	40	"SkyWeek October 1–7, 2012"	view	September 30, 2012	
The constellations of the Great Sea spill from the jug of Aquarius, the Water Carrier. And Neptune, the outermost planet, is in Aquarius now.
47	41	"SkyWeek October 8–14, 2012"	view	October 7, 2012	
Cassiopeia and Perseus are the prime constellations of the autumn Milky Way. And they’re home to some of the sky’s finest star clusters.
48	42	"SkyWeek October 15–21, 2012"	view	October 14, 2012	
The constellations Andromeda, Cassiopeia, Cepheus, and Perseus are linked in Greek mythology by a wonderful story.
49	43	"SkyWeek October 22–28, 2012"	view	October 21, 2012	
The Moon, our closest neighbor in space, is amazing to the unaided eye and binoculars. Its surface reveals a lot about Earth’s history, too.
50	44	"SkyWeek October 29 - November 4, 2012"	view	October 28, 2012	
Jupiter’s four biggest moons are whole worlds in their own right. They include the most active volcanoes known and a suspected habitat for life.
51	45	"SkyWeek November 5–11, 2012"	view	November 4, 2012	
The Andromeda Galaxy is on fine display these evenings. It’s the most distant object you’re likely to see without binoculars or a telescope, but it’s right next door in cosmic terms.
52	46	"SkyWeek November 12–18, 2012"	view	November 11, 2012	
A superthin Moon floats below Venus before sunrise on Monday, November 12th. And you might be able to spot the reborn crescent on Wednesday or Thursday evening.
53	47	"SkyWeek November 19–25, 2012"	view	November 18, 2012	
Dazzling Jupiter blazes near the sky’s two most spectacular star clusters — the Pleiades, or Seven Sisters, and the Hyades, the closest rich star cluster to Earth.
54	48	"SkyWeek November 26 - December 2, 2012"	view	November 25, 2012	
Saturn glows very close to brilliant Venus before sunrise on Monday, November 26th. And the Moon is spectacularly close to bright Jupiter on Wednesday evening.
55	49	"SkyWeek December 3–9, 2012"	view	December 2, 2012	
Three of the sky’s finest star formations are climbing the southeastern sky. The Pleaides lead the way, then Jupiter with the Hyades, and magnificent Orion rounds out the group.
56	50	"SkyWeek December 10–16, 2012"	view	December 9, 2012	
The Geminid meteor shower will be strongest from Thursday evening through Friday morning, though more meteors than usual will fall all week. Conditions are perfect this year, with no Moon to blind you to the faintest meteors.
57	51	"SkyWeek December 17–23, 2012"	view	December 16, 2012	
Winter starts on Friday, and coincidentally the ancient Mayan calendar flips over to a new "baktun." Contrary to the doomsayers, nothing unusual will happen. But some astronomical phenomena are genuinely dangerous.
58	52	"SkyWeek December 24–30, 2012"	view	December 23, 2012	
The Moon pairs spectacularly with Jupiter on the evening of Christmas Day, December 25. And Sirius, the night sky’s brightest star, is at its highest at midnight as the year winds to its end.
59	53	"SkyWeek December 31 - January 6, 2012"	view	December 30, 2012	
A splendid vista of bright stars and one dazzling planet greets stargazers on the stroke of the New Year. And two remarkable stars that vary in brightness are high in the northwest.

=== Season 3: 2013 ===
The 2013 season started on January 1, 2013.

No. overall	No. in season	Title	View Episodes	Original release date	Prod. code
60	1	"SkyWeek January 7–13, 2013"	view	January 6, 2013	
Auriga the Charioteer is nearly overhead in the evening sky. Its prominent pentagon includes dazzling Capella, meaning She Goat, the sixth brightest star in the night sky.
61	2	"SkyWeek January 14–20, 2013"	view	January 13, 2013	
This is a great week to observe the Moon, Earth's closest neighbor in space. It shows much detail to the unaided eye, and it’s amazing through binoculars and small telescopes.
62	3	"SkyWeek January 21–27, 2013"	view	January 20, 2013	
The Moon forms a spectacular pair with Jupiter high in the southeast. They’re in the constellation Taurus the Bull, which was the first constellation of the zodiac at the dawn of history.
63	4	"SkyWeek January 28 - February 3, 2013"	view	January 27, 2013	
Look just below Orion’s Belt for his Sword. It’s centered on the Great Orion Nebula, which is currently giving birth to hot young stars at a furious rate.
64	5	"SkyWeek February 4–10, 2013"	view	February 3, 2013	
Mars is spectacularly close to Mercury shortly after sunset on Friday February 8th. Spot the two smallest planets side by side in the sky — but nowhere near each other in space.
65	6	"SkyWeek February 11–17, 2013"	view	February 10, 2013	
A beautifully thin crescent Moon floats upper right of Mercury on Monday. This is a great week to spot Mercury, something few people have knowingly done.
66	7	"SkyWeek February 18–24, 2013"	view	February 17, 2013	
The constellation Gemini, the Twins, flies almost overhead in late February and early March. Its brightest stars are Castor and Pollux, named after the famous twins of Greek and Roman mythology.
67	8	"SkyWeek February 25 - March 3, 2013"	view	February 24, 2013	
Splendid Leo the Lion rears up on its hind legs in the evening sky. Most constellations bear little resemblance to their names, but Leo really does look like a lion.
68	9	"SkyWeek March 4–10, 2013"	view	March 3, 2013	
Cancer the Crab is home to the Praesepe, or Beehive. It looks like a cloud of light to the unaided eye, but binoculars show that it’s a glorious star cluster.
69	10	"SkyWeek March 11–17, 2013"	view	March 10, 2013	
If we’re lucky, Comet PANSTARRS will shine low in the west shortly after sunset this week. But comets are notoriously unpredictable, so we won’t know for sure until the day arrives.
70	11	"SkyWeek March 18–24, 2013"	view	March 17, 2013	
Spring begins this week on Wednesday morning. This is the day when the Sun rises due East and sets due West all over the world.
71	12	"SkyWeek March 25–31, 2013"	view	March 24, 2013	
The Big Dipper, the sky’s best-known star pattern, is now high in the northeast. Find out how you can use it to tell the directions and the time of night.
71	12	"SkyWeek April 1–7, 2013"	view	March 31, 2013	
The constellation Puppis floats lower left of dazzling Sirius. It’s just the tip of the gigantic ancient constellation Argo, the ship that carried Jason and the Argonauts on their quest for the Golden Fleece.
72	13	"SkyWeek April 8–14, 2013"	view	April 7, 2013	
The Moon pairs beautifully with Jupiter on Sunday, April 14th. Take a good look at Jupiter, the king of the planets, because it’s getting lower each evening.
73	14	"SkyWeek April 15–21, 2013"	view	April 14, 2013	
Three bright lights dominate the late-spring sky: Spica, the brightest star of Virgo the Maiden, Arcturus, the brightest star of Boötes the Herdsman, and the ringed planet Saturn.
74	15	"SkyWeek April 22–28, 2013"	view	April 21, 2013	
Saturn is the second-biggest planet in the Solar System, big enough to fit 800 Earths inside. Its most prominent feature is its magnificent ring system, made of countless chunks of ice.
75	16	"SkyWeek April 29 - May 5, 2013"	view	April 28, 2013	
The Big Dipper is now at its highest in the northern sky. Galileo discovered the double star Mizar in its handle because he was looking for parallax, trying to prove that Earth goes around the Sun.
76	17	"SkyWeek May 6–12, 2013"	view	May 5, 2013	
The faint constellation Coma Berenices hosts one of the closest star clusters in the sky. It has a fascinating history and is a splendid sight through binoculars.
77	18	"SkyWeek May 13–19, 2013"	view	May 12, 2013	
Stargazers throughout the contiguous U.S. can see parts of the huge, ancient constellation Centaurus poking above the southern horizon. From Hawaii or southern Florida this constellation is splendid indeed.
78	19	"SkyWeek May 20–26, 2013"	view	May 12, 2013	
The planets Venus, Jupiter, and Mercury form an amazingly tight triangle by the end of this week. This is the closest conjunction of three bright planets until January 2021.
79	20	"SkyWeek May 20–26, 2013"	view	May 19, 2013	
The planets Venus, Jupiter, and Mercury form an amazingly tight triangle by the end of this week. This is the closest conjunction of three bright planets until January 2021.
80	21	"SkyWeek May 27 - June 2, 2013"	[ view]	May 19, 2013	
81	22	"SkyWeek June 3–9, 2013"	view	June 2, 2013	
This is the best week in 2013 to view Mercury, the elusive innermost planet. And find out how the quasar 3C 273 was first discovered.
82	23	"SkyWeek June 10–16, 2013"	view	June 9, 2013	
A beautifully thin crescent Moon forms a triangle with Mercury and Venus after sunset on Monday. Then Venus appears a little higher each evening and Mercury a little lower.
83	24	"SkyWeek June 17–23, 2013"	view	June 16, 2013	
This week features a close pairing of Mercury and Venus, the beginning of summer, and the largest and closest full Moon of the year.
84	25	"SkyWeek June 24–30, 2013"	view	June 23, 2013	
Days are long and nights are short during the first full week of summer. Learn how summer is defined in astronomical terms, and why it matters to all life on Earth.
85	26	"SkyWeek July 1–7, 2013"	view	June 30, 2013	
As the sky grows dark in the evening, the stars of the Summer Triangle are rising in the east: Vega in the constellation Lyra, Altair in Aquila, and Deneb in Cygnus the Swan.
86	27	"SkyWeek July 8–14, 2013"	view	July 7, 2013	
Magnificent Scorpius is near its highest at nightfall. This is one of the few constellations that really resembles its name. Antares, its chief star, is strikingly bright and red.
87	28	"SkyWeek July 15–21, 2013"	view	July 14, 2013	
Three spectacularly close approaches take place in the heavens this week. The Moon meets the stars Spica and Zubenelgenubi, and Venus passes close to Regulus.
88	29	"SkyWeek July 22–28, 2013"	view	July 21, 2013	
Two fine constellations are side by side in the south: hook-tailed Scorpius and Sagittarius, the Archer. The center of our Milky Way galaxy lies behind the stars of Sagittarius.
89	30	"SkyWeek July 29 - August 4, 2013"	view	July 28, 2013	
The Milky Way band is one of nature’s most magnificent sights. But most Americans are unable to see it because of the creeping blight of light pollution.
90	31	"SkyWeek August 5–11, 2013"	view	August 4, 2013	
The Perseid meteor shower is ramping up this week, reaching its strongest from midnight on Sunday, August 11th, to dawn’s first light the next morning.
91	32	"SkyWeek August 12–18, 2013"	view	August 11, 2013	
The Perseid meteor shower winds down this week. Learn about the different kinds of meteoroids, and what happens on the rare occasions when they strike Earth’s surface.
92	33	"SkyWeek August 19–25, 2013"	view	August 18, 2013	
Vega, the brightest star of the Summer Triangle, is almost overhead now. Together with five fainter stars, Vega forms the strikingly geometric constellation Lyra, the Lyre.
93	34	"SkyWeek August 26 - September 1, 2013"	view	August 25, 2013	
Deneb, the faintest star of the Summer Triangle, belongs to the magnificent constellation Cygnus, the Swan, which flies along the Milky Way. Cygnus’s brightest stars form the splendid Northern Cross.
94	35	"SkyWeek September 2–8, 2013"	view	September 1, 2013	
The Moon pairs with Mars early on Monday morning, and it’s spectacularly close to Venus at dusk on the following Sunday. In between, Venus passes a finger’s width above the bright star Spica.
95	36	"SkyWeek September 9–15, 2013"	view	September 8, 2013	
The waxing Moon traverses the sky this week, and can be tracked in its appearance each night as it changes from 20% to 85% lit. The same side of the Moon always faces Earth.
96	37	"SkyWeek September 16–22, 2013"	view	September 15, 2013	
Autumn begins on Sunday, September 22nd. The full Moon closest to this date, called the Harvest Moon, rises just before sunset on Wednesday and sets just after sunrise on Thursday.
97	38	"SkyWeek September 23–29, 2013"	view	September 22, 2013	
You can view the change of seasons in the evening sky. The signature constellations of summer are setting in the west, while bright Cassiopeia, Perseus, Andromeda, and Pegasus rise in the northeast.
98	39	"SkyWeek September 30 - October 6, 2013"	view	September 29, 2013	
Jupiter, the king of the planets, passes extraordinarily near the star Wasat in the sky. Although they appear close together, they’re actually totally different kinds of objects at wildly different distances from Earth.
99	40	"SkyWeek October 7–13, 2013"	view	October 6, 2013	
Venus passes the star Delta Scorpii this week. In June 2000, Argentine stargazer Sebastián Otero caught Delta in a midlife crisis, changing from a normal star to one that varies in brightness.
100	41	"SkyWeek October 14–20, 2013"	view	October 13, 2013	
Dazzling Venus creeps through Scorpius, passing a short distance above the strikingly red star Antares. And in the predawn sky, Mars passes slightly farther from Regulus, the brightest star of Leo.
101	42	"SkyWeek October 21–27, 2013"	view	October 20, 2013	
The Perseus constellation group fills the northeastern sky. The W of Queen Cassiopeia is most striking. Her son-in-law Perseus below is home to one of the sky’s best but least-known star clusters.
102	43	"SkyWeek October 28 - November 3, 2013"	view	October 27, 2013	
Look to the right of Cassiopeia for a formation that I call the Really Big Dipper. It’s composed of the three brightest stars of Andromeda together with the Great Square of Pegasus.
103	44	"SkyWeek November 4–10, 2013"	view	November 3, 2013	
The ancient constellations of the Great Sea fill the southern sky, from Cetus the Sea Monster to strange Capricornus the Sea Goat, whose origin is lost in the mists of time.
104	45	"SkyWeek November 11–17, 2013"	view	November 10, 2013	
Comet ISON may become faintly visible in the predawn sky this week. But comets are notoriously unpredictable, so this is not a certainty.
105	46	"SkyWeek November 18–24, 2013"	view	November 17, 2013	
Mercury, the innermost planet, appears in the predawn sky as Comet ISON races toward its rendezvous with the Sun. And Saturn, the ringed wonder, joins the action late in the week.

== See also ==
- The Sky Above Us, a television show on astronomy
- The Sky at Night, the longest running television show in the world
- Star Gazers, a weekly television show on astronomy
- StarDate (radio), a daily syndicated radio show highlighting upcoming celestial events
- White House Astronomy Night
