= Broward College =

Public college in Fort Lauderdale, Florida, US

- Former names: Junior College of Broward County (1959–1968); Broward Junior College (1968–1970); Broward Community College (1970–2008)
- Type: Public college
- Established: 1959; 67 years ago
- Parent institution: Florida College System
- Accreditation: SACS
- Endowment: $44 million (2024)
- Budget: $220.8 million (2024)
- President: Torey Alston
- Faculty: 349 (full-time); 755 (part-time)
- Undergraduates: 30,057 (fall 2022)
- Location: Fort Lauderdale, Florida, United States; 26°04′49″N 80°14′04″W
- Campus: Midsize city
- Colors: Broward College Blue
- Nickname: Seahawks
- Mascot: Sammy the Seahawk
- Website: www.broward.edu

Broward College is a public college based in Fort Lauderdale, Florida, Miramar, Florida, Pembroke Pines, Florida and Davie, Florida. It is a member of the Florida College System, and offers several associate and baccalaureate degree programs.

== History ==
The college was established in 1959 as the Junior College of Broward County with 701 students and 28 faculty members, initially operating in buildings that once belonged to a naval air station on the western end of Fort Lauderdale-Hollywood International Airport. It moved to its permanent site in 1963. Its name changed to Broward Junior College in 1968, then to Broward Community College in 1970, before becoming Broward College in 2008. Over the decades, the institution expanded with new campuses and centers to meet growing demand.

== Campuses ==
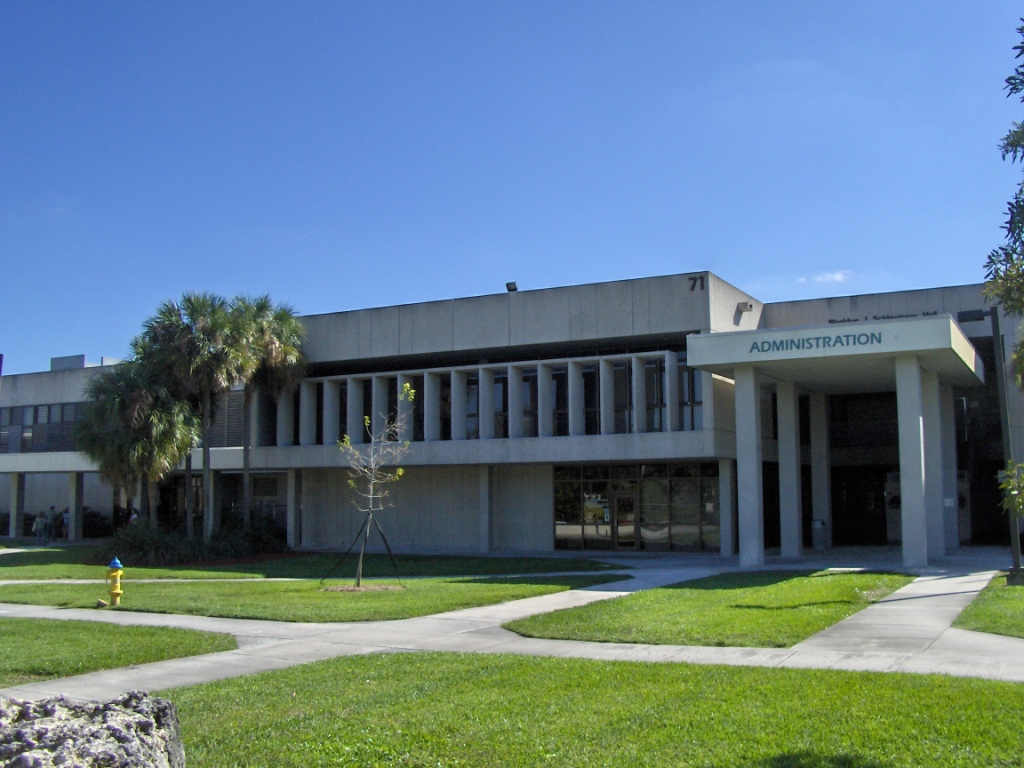
Broward College South Campus administration building

Broward College operates three main campuses and several additional centers across Broward County. The A. Hugh Adams Central Campus in Davie, the first permanent site of the college, houses the Buehler Planetarium, a health sciences complex, and a joint-use library with Florida Atlantic University. The Judson A. Samuels South Campus in Pembroke Pines is home to the Aviation Institute and a regional library, while the North Campus in Coconut Creek includes health science programs, the Citrix IT Academy, and the Junior Achievement Huizenga Enterprise Village. Additional facilities include the Willis Holcombe Center in Downtown Fort Lauderdale, which offers classroom space and administrative offices, and the Tigertail Lake Center in Dania Beach, which provides aquatic and adventure learning programs. Broward College also extends its reach through international centers in countries such as Ecuador, Peru, Sri Lanka, and Vietnam, delivering courses identical to those taught in Florida.

== Athletics ==
Broward College competed in collegiate sports from 1962 until 2021, participating in the National Junior College Athletic Association before discontinuing its athletic programs for budgetary reasons.
