= StarDate =

American science radio program

- Logo for the StarDate radio program
- Country of origin: United States
- Language: English
- Created by: Deborah Byrd
- Produced by: Doug Addison
- Executive producer: Damond Benningfield
- Edited by: Dr. Tom Barnes
- Narrated by: Billy Henry
- Recording studio: Austin, Texas
- Original release: 1977
- No. of episodes: 14,600+
- Website: stardate.org
- Podcast: stardate.org/feeds/podcast.xml

StarDate is a science radio program of The University of Texas at Austin McDonald Observatory, broadcast on over 300 radio stations. It is a daily guide to the night sky and breaking astronomical news. Typically heard without formal introduction, StarDate is a self-contained science news feature interwoven with routine radio programming. It is the longest-running science outreach program on U.S. radio.

Created in 1978 by science journalist Deborah Byrd of the McDonald Observatory, the short (2-minute) format of StarDate sprang from Byrd's scripts written for a telephone hot line on astronomy, which had started a year earlier. The telephone scripts had attracted the notice of a producer at radio station KLBJ-FM in Austin, who had turned them into a radio show that was broadcast for a year under the name "Have You Seen the Stars Tonight?" — a reference to the song co-written by Paul Kantner of Jefferson Starship. With the support of Harlan James Smith, McDonald Observatory's director, and after securing funding from the National Science Foundation, Byrd changed the name to Star Date (invoking the term "stardate" used in the opening monologue of the 1960s television series Star Trek) and began the series' national distribution in 1979.

The niche broadcasting position of StarDate has always been its quick but relaxed, diary-like delivery which allows it to be interspersed with regular programming.

Byrd produced the show, and Joel Block hosted it, until 1991, when a change in management at McDonald led both to depart and start another syndicated radio series, Earth & Sky, which aired from 1991 to 2013 and was heard on about 1,000 radio stations.

Beginning in 1991, StarDate was produced by Damond Benningfield and hosted by Sandy Wood, a San Antonio radio personality who was one of the first female disc jockeys in the southwestern United States. After Wood's retirement on July 16, 2019, the host position was assumed by Billy Henry, an Austin-based musician and educator.

Stations that broadcast StarDate include affiliates and owned stations of CBS Radio and National Public Radio, totaling approximately 300 stations. The program is also available as a downloadable podcast. Universo, the Spanish language version of StarDate, aired from 1995 to 2010.

StarDate Magazine was first known as McDonald Observatory News in 1972. It became a bimonthly magazine in 1988.

== See also ==
- The Sky Above Us, a television show on astronomy
- The Sky at Night, the longest running television show in the world
- SkyWeek, a weekly television show on astronomy
- Star Gazers, a weekly television show on astronomy
