= The Sky at Night =

British TV science programme (since 1957)

- Genre: Documentary
- Presented by: Sir Patrick Moore; Chris Lintott; Lucie Green; Dame Maggie Aderin; Pete Lawrence; Dr George Dransfield
- Theme music composer: Jean Sibelius
- Opening theme: "At the Castle Gate"
- Ending theme: "At the Castle Gate"
- Country of origin: United Kingdom
- Original language: English
- No. of episodes: 825

Production
- Running time: 30 minutes
- Production companies: BBC Birmingham (until 2013); BBC Science (2014–2015); BBC Studios Science Unit (2015–present)

Original release
- Network: BBC One (Note: Known as the BBC Television Service from 1957-1960 and BBC TV from 1960-1964) (1957–2013); BBC Four (2014–present)
- Release: 24 April 1957 – present

The Sky at Night is a documentary television programme on astronomy produced by the BBC. The show had the same permanent presenter, Sir Patrick Moore, from its first monthly broadcast on 24 April 1957 until 7 January 2013. The latter date was a posthumous broadcast, following Moore's death on 9 December 2012. This made it the longest-running programme with the same presenter in television history. Many early episodes are missing, either because the tapes were wiped or discarded, or because the episode was broadcast live and never recorded in the first place.

The programme was shown monthly up until 2023.

Beginning with the 3 February 2013 edition, the show was co-presented by Lucie Green and Chris Lintott. Since December 2013 Maggie Aderin has also been a presenter. In April 2023, Dr George Dransfield joined the show as a presenter.

Pete Lawrence has presented an observing section on the programme since 2004 as well as producing an online monthly star Guide on the BBC Sky at Night webpage.

The programme's opening and closing theme music is "At the Castle Gate", from the incidental music to Pelléas et Mélisande, written in 1905 by Jean Sibelius, performed by the Royal Philharmonic Orchestra and conducted by Sir Thomas Beecham.

== Content ==
The programme covers a wide range of general astronomical and space-related topics. Topics include stellar life cycles, radio astronomy, artificial satellites, black holes, neutron stars and many others. The programme also covers events happening in the night sky at the time of broadcast, such as a bright comet or a meteor shower, and recent developments in space and astronomy, such as the Rosetta space mission and the detection of phosphine in Venus's atmosphere.

Explaining the show's enduring appeal, Moore said: "Astronomy's a fascinating subject. You look up... you can't help getting interested and it's there. We've tried to bring it to the people.. it's not me, it's the appeal of the subject."

== Presenters ==
Sky at Night Presenters
Years	Presenter
24 April 1957 – 7 January 2013	Sir Patrick Moore
3 February 2013 – present	Lucie Green
3 February 2013 – present	Chris Lintott
December 2013 – present	Dame Maggie Aderin
November 2004 – present	Pete Lawrence
April 2023 – present	George Dransfield

== Notable guests ==
Many of the world's leading astronomers have appeared on the show through the years, including Harlow Shapley (the first to measure the size of the Milky Way galaxy), Fred Hoyle, Carl Sagan, Jocelyn Bell Burnell, Samuel Tolansky, Harold Spencer Jones, Martin Ryle, Richard Ellis, Carlos Frenk and Bart Bok. Other guests have included Arthur C. Clarke, Astronomer Royal Sir Martin Rees, Arnold Wolfendale, Allan Chapman, Sir Bernard Lovell, Michael Bentine. Many well-known astronauts have also appeared on the programme, such as Piers Sellers, Eugene Cernan, Buzz Aldrin and Neil Armstrong.

In July 2004, Moore was unable to make the broadcast owing to a severe bout of salmonellosis. He was replaced for this one occasion by the cosmologist Chris Lintott of Oxford University, who had been co-presenting for several years. Moore returned for the August programme, this was the only occasion in the 55 years of Moore's tenure that he did not host the programme.

Brian May, the Queen guitarist and astrophysicist, has occasionally been a guest on the show.

On 1 April 2007, Moore presented the 50th Anniversary edition of the show, a special "time travel" edition which included the appearance of Jon Culshaw as Moore's younger self. The 50th anniversary programme was filmed at Teddington Studios as the 1957 home of the programme, Lime Grove Studios, had been demolished in 1992.

On 6 March 2011, Moore presented the 700th edition of the show, a special retrospective episode which included Jon Culshaw once again appearing as Moore's younger self, as well as Brian May.

== Move to BBC Four ==
In September 2013 the BBC announced that the programme's future after December 2013 was under review, prompting speculation that the corporation would end it, and a petition asking for the show to be retained. On 29 October it was announced that the programme would continue, but would only be shown on BBC Four, ending a 54-year run on the BBC's flagship channel.

== Commemorative honours ==
The International Astronomical Union celebrated the 50th anniversary of the show by naming an asteroid 57424 Caelumnoctu, the number referring to the first broadcast date and the name being Latin for "The Sky at Night".

In February 2007, the Royal Mail issued a set of six astronomy stamps to celebrate the 50th anniversary of the programme.

In the Guinness Book of World Records, Sir Patrick Moore is listed as the most prolific TV presenter in the world, having hosted all but one episode of the programme between 1957 and January 2013.

== DVD release ==
A DVD of the special commemorative Sky at Night film Apollo 11: A Night to Remember was released on 6 July 2009 to coincide with the 40th anniversary of the first man on the Moon.

== See also ==
- The Sky Above Us, a television show on astronomy
- BBC Sky at Night, a British monthly magazine named after the series
- SkyWeek, an American television show highlighting upcoming celestial events
- Jack Horkheimer: Star Gazer, an American television programme about naked-eye astronomy
- StarDate, an American daily syndicated radio show highlighting upcoming celestial events
