= Buehler Planetarium and Observatory =

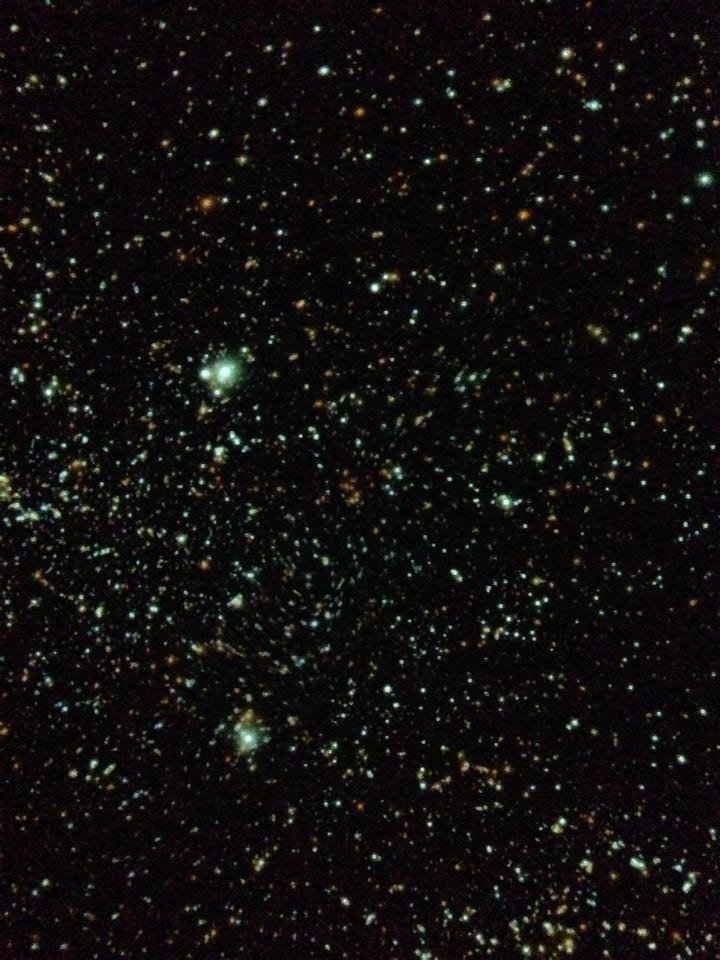
- View of the night sky (star projected) from inside the planetarium.
- Established: 1965
- Location: 3501 Southwest Davie Road, Davie, Florida, US 33314
- Type: Science museum
- Director: Susan Barnett
- Owner: Broward College
- Website: www.broward.edu/studentlife/planetarium/Pages/default.aspx

The Buehler Planetarium and Observatory is a 40-foot in diameter, domed theater. It is located at the A.Hugh Adams central campus of Broward College in Davie, Florida. The planetarium uses the Definiti fulldome video system. It is the only public planetarium in Broward County.

Shows are held on Wednesdays, Fridays, and Saturdays. Admission costs $4 during the week and $6 during the weekend. Admission is free for Broward College students with ID. The observatory patio houses 20 telescopes, which are free to use and are available from 8-10 pm on these three show nights.

Renovation update: Telescope observation nights are currently limited to Wednesday nights, from 7-10 pm, while the planetarium undergoes renovations.

== History ==
The planetarium was opened in 1965 and was funded by a donation by the Emil Buehler Trust.

== Gallery ==
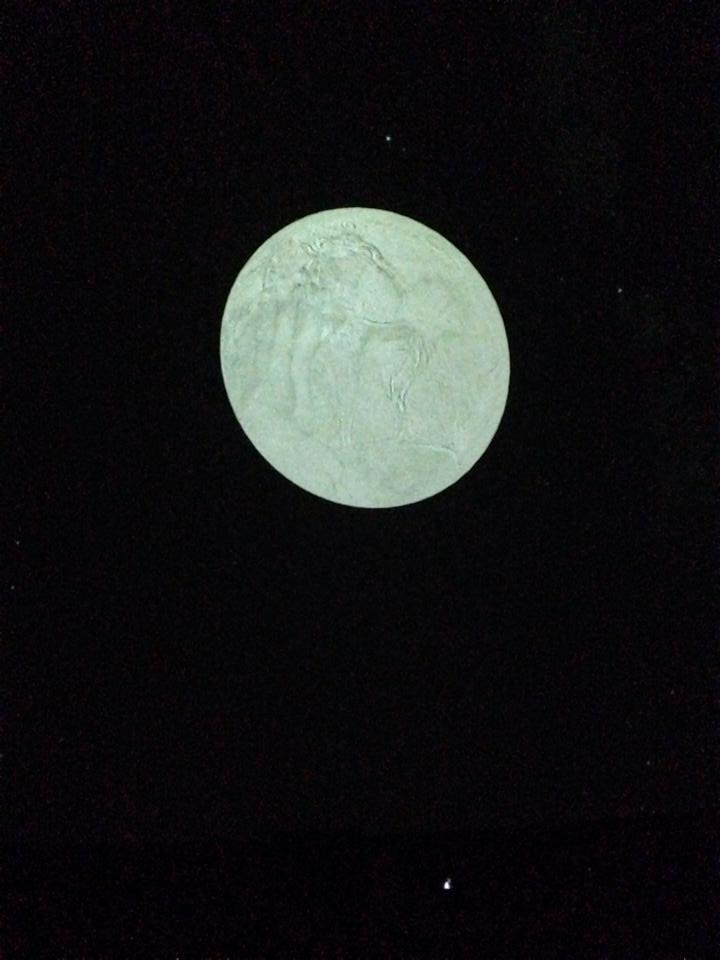

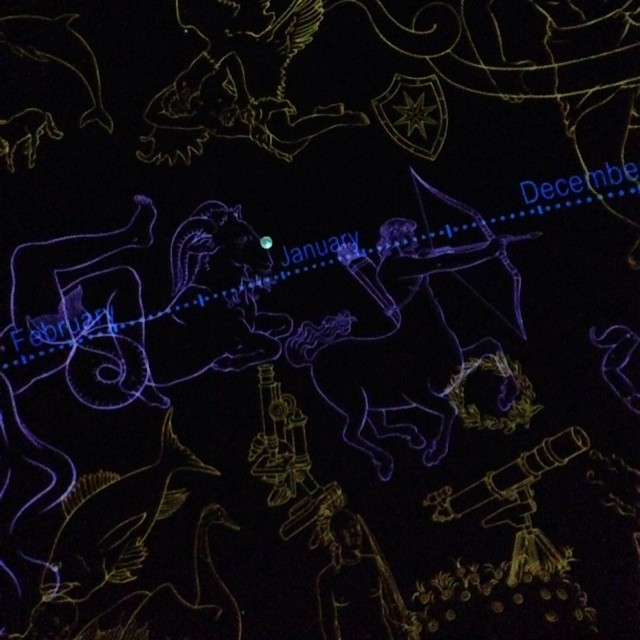

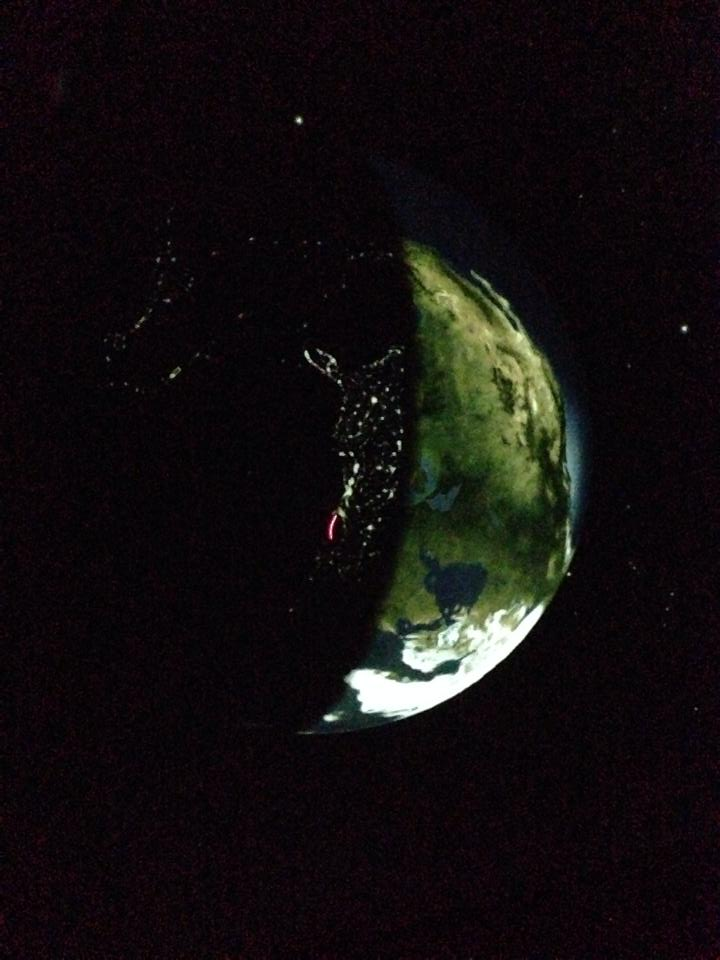

== See also ==
- Kika Silva Pla Planetarium
- List of planetariums
