= Kika Silva Pla Planetarium =

Santa Fe College Kika Silva Pla Planetarium
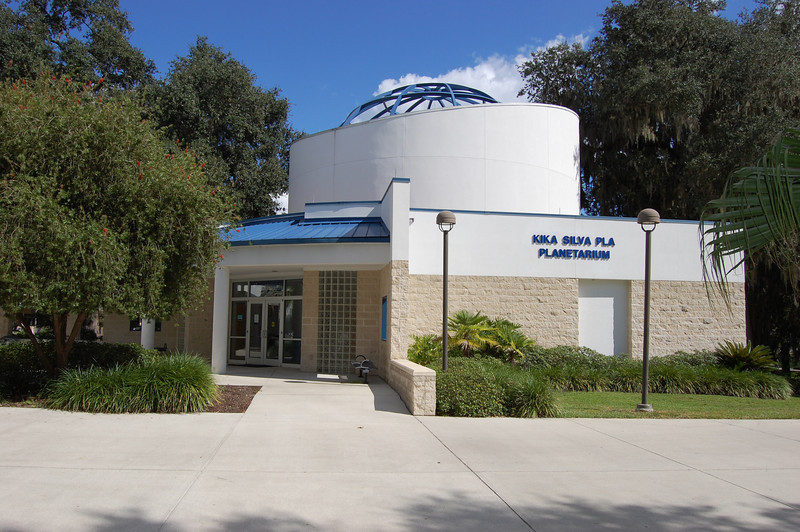
- Established: September 2006
- Location: Gainesville, Florida, US
- Coordinates: 29.6819°N 82.4331°W
- Type: Science museum
- Director: James Albury
- Owner: Santa Fe College
- Website: www.sfcollege.edu/planetarium/

The Santa Fe College Kika Silva Pla Planetarium is a 34-foot in diameter, domed theater in Gainesville, Florida. The planetarium seats 60 people and uses two projection systems. An In-Space-System (ISS) 1C-3K digital projection system by RSA Cosmos and an optical-mechanical Chronos Space Simulator manufactured by Goto.

== History ==
The planetarium was dedicated in September 2006 and officially opened to the public in September 2007 and is located on the Northwest Campus of Santa Fe College. The SF Kika Silva Pla Planetarium was made possible by a donation of John Pla and his wife Amy Howard, on behalf of the Pla family, in recognition of his mother, Kika Silva Pla's, commitment to education and passion for social justice and civic engagement. The planetarium was funded with additional support from a special federal appropriation arranged by Congressman Cliff Stearns.

Laurent Pellerin was the planetarium's first coordinator. James C. Albury became the planetarium coordinator in October 2009, and was a co-host on the internationally syndicated PBS show "Star Gazer".

== See also ==
- Buehler Planetarium and Observatory
- List of planetariums
- Amateur astronomy
