= BBC Sky at Night =

British monthly magazine about astronomy

- Cover of the December 2024 issue
- Editor: Chris Bramley
- Categories: Astronomy
- Frequency: Monthly
- Publisher: Andrew Davies
- Total circulation: 23,453 (June 2016)
- Founded: 2005
- Company: Our Media
- Country: United Kingdom
- Language: English
- Website: www.skyatnightmagazine.com
- ISSN: 1745-9869

BBC Sky at Night is a British monthly magazine about astronomy aimed at amateur astronomers and published by Our Media. Its title is taken from the television program produced by the BBC, The Sky at Night. The magazine, in comparison with the TV series, includes more technical and scientific information. Until 2015, it also included a bonus CD-ROM with software programs, the latest astronomical photographs, written materials and 'classic' episodes of The Sky at Night from the BBC archives (from 2015, the monthly content was moved online).

== History ==
BBC Sky at Night was launched in 2005. The first issue, which featured Patrick Moore on the cover and included a copy of Moore's Moon map as a free gift, sold out and back issues are no longer available. Copies of Issue 1 have since sold for over £100 on eBay. In April 2007, the magazine celebrated the 50th anniversary of The Sky at Night on BBC TV with a specially-themed issue, which was produced in two different covers.

Patrick Moore was an editorial advisor serving as Editor Emeritus, along with Chris Lintott, serving as Contributing Editor respectively.

As of 2025, Chris Bramley is serving as the magazine's editor, with Steve Marsh as Art Editor, Ezzy Pearson as features editor, Jess Wilder as production editor, and Iain Todd as content editor.
