= Dean Regas =

American astronomer

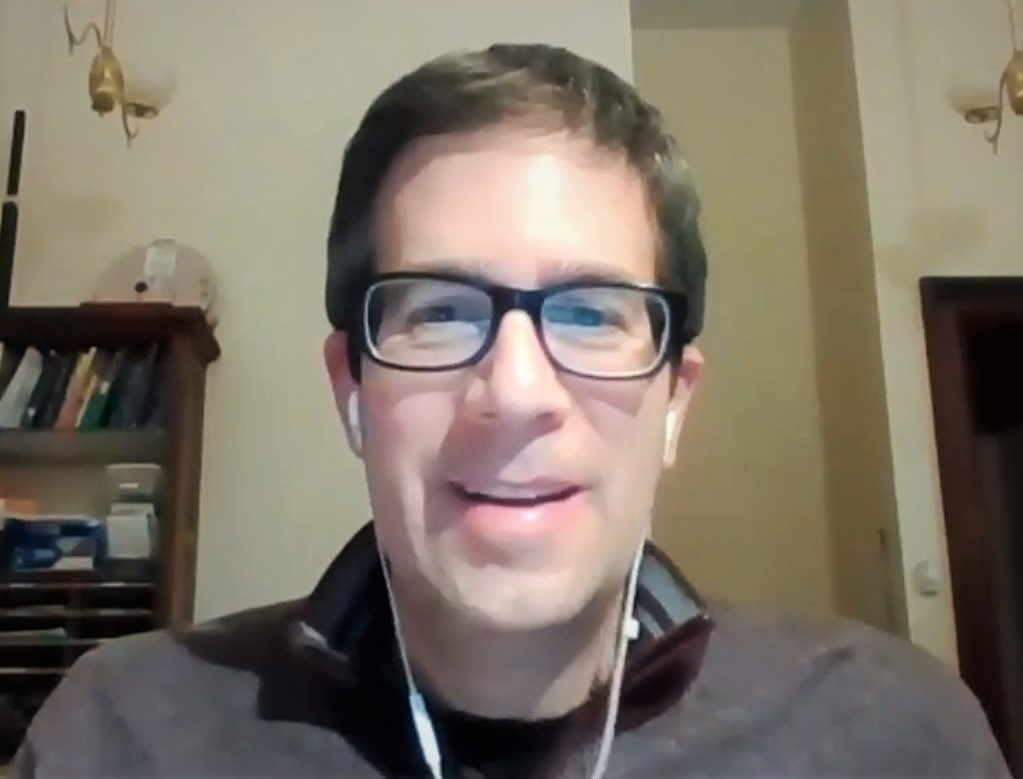
Regas on NASA Night Sky Network webinar in 2019

Dean Regas is an American astronomer, public speaker, author, and television host. He is most widely known as the cohost of the syndicated television show Star Gazers, which airs daily on more than 100 PBS stations around the world. He was the Outreach Astronomer for the Cincinnati Observatory from 2000 to 2023 where he specialized in astronomy education and public speaking. Regas is the author of three books Facts From Space!, 100 Things to See in the Night Sky, and 100 Things to See in the Southern Night Sky.

He is a Contributing Editor to Sky & Telescope magazine and a contributor to Astronomy magazine. Regas is a frequent guest on nationally broadcast radio shows Science Friday and Here and Now. In 2017 he created a podcast for popular astronomy called Looking Up, which he co-hosts with Cincinnati Observatory Development Director Anna Hehman.

== Early life ==
Dean was born and raised in Columbus, Ohio and both of his parents are Greek-Americans. He moved to Cincinnati in 1992 to attend Xavier University where he received a B.A. in history and an M.A. in secondary education.

== Cincinnati Observatory ==
Regas began his career at the Cincinnati Observatory as a volunteer in 1998. He was hired in 2000 as the Outreach Educator, tasked with bringing astronomy programs to schools around the area. He has since become an expert in observational astronomy. Regas delivers about 150 astronomy talks per year around the region and across the country to audiences of all ages. He stopped working for the observatory in 2023.

== Star Gazers ==
Star Gazers is a weekly television program, a 1-minute and a 5-minute version, that covers what people can observe in the night sky from their backyards. Regas guest-hosted Star Gazers in 2010. Along with astronomer James C. Albury, have co-hosted the show since 2011. Regas and Albury are the main writers and presenters for 104 episodes per year that air for free on PBS stations around the world.

== Author ==
In 2000 he began writing astronomy articles for The Cincinnati Enquirer and has since written more than 120 pieces about observational astronomy. His articles have also appeared in Sky & Telescope Magazine, Astronomy Magazine, and USA Today, and he blogged for The Huffington Post from 2013 to 2018.

=== Books ===
- Facts From Space!: From Super-Secret Spacecraft to Volcanoes in Outer Space, Extraterrestrial Facts to Blow Your Mind. (Adams Media, 2016). ISBN 9781440597015
- 100 Things to See in the Night Sky: From Planets and Satellites to Meteors and Constellations, Your Guide to Stargazing. (Adams Media, 2017; Expanded edition, 2020). ISBN 9781507205051
- 100 Things to See in the Southern Night Sky: From Planets and Satellites to Meteors and Constellations, Your Guide to Stargazing. (Adams Media, 2018). ISBN 9781507207802
- How to Teach Grown-Ups About Pluto: The Cutting-Edge Space Science of the Solar System. (Britannica Books, 2022). ISBN 9781913750510
- 1,000 Facts About Space. (National Geographic Kids, 2022). ISBN 9781426373428.

== Awards and recognitions ==
- Winner of Astronomy Magazine's 2008 "Out-of-this-World" Award for astronomy education
- Recipient of a NASA ROSES grant (2010-2012) for Future Galileos, a project that awarded 100 quality telescopes to educators in the Cincinnati area
- Asteroid 8815 Deanregas is named after him
