= James C. Albury =

- Education: Miami Science Museum and University of Florida
- Occupations: Co-host of Star Gazers, Director of Kika Silva Pla Planetarium
- Spouse: Kandra Albury
- Children: 3

James C. Albury is an American television personality and director of the Kika Silva Pla Planetarium at Santa Fe College.

Albury was born in Denver, Colorado, but grew up in Miami, Florida. At age 14, he started volunteering at the Miami Museum of Science's planetarium. He stayed with the museum until he was 22 years old. At 21, Albury started as a recruit in University of Florida's Astronomy Program. He earned a bachelor's degree plus one year of master's work before being hired at the university in the Office of Academic Technology.

In October 2011, Albury became the co-host of PBS television series Star Gazers. In 2020, he launched and became host of the astronomy series, The Sky Above Us.
