= Star Gazers =

US interstitial public television program about astronomy

- Title screen for Jack Horkheimer: Star Hustler, showing the starhustler.com URL before the name change in 1997
- Also known as: Jack Horkheimer: Star Hustler (1976–1997), Jack Horkheimer: Star Gazer (1997–2011)
- Starring: Jack Horkheimer (Host, 1976–2010), Chris Trigg (Guest host 2010), Ed Romano (Guest host 2011), Dean Regas (Co-host 2010–2019), James C. Albury (Co-host 2011–2019), Marlene Hidalgo (co-host 2011-2014), Trace Dominguez (Host 2019-present)
- Opening theme: "Arabesque No. 1" by Claude Debussy, performed by Isao Tomita (1976–2011)
- Country of origin: United States
- Original language: English
- No. of seasons: 47
- No. of episodes: 2,350+

Production
- Production locations: Miami, Florida
- Camera setup: Green Screen
- Running time: 5:00 or 1:00 (per episode), 52 episodes yearly

Original release
- Network: WPBT; syndicated to PBS stations
- Release: November 6, 1976 – present

Star Gazers (formerly known as Jack Horkheimer: Star Hustler and later Jack Horkheimer: Star Gazer) is a short astronomy show on American public television previously hosted by Jack Horkheimer, executive director of the Miami Space Transit Planetarium. After his death in 2010, a series of guest astronomers hosted until 2011, when Dean Regas, James Albury, and Marlene Hidalgo became permanent co-hosts. In 2019, Dean Regas and James Albury stepped down from the program and were replaced by Trace Dominguez. On the weekly program, the host informs the viewer of significant astronomical events for the upcoming week, including key constellations, stars and planets, lunar eclipses and conjunctions, as well as historical and scientific information about these events.

The program is available free to all Public Broadcasting Service (PBS) public television stations, educational institutions and astronomy clubs. A month of episodes can be recorded from a satellite feed that occurs approximately two weeks before the official broadcast dates.

== History ==
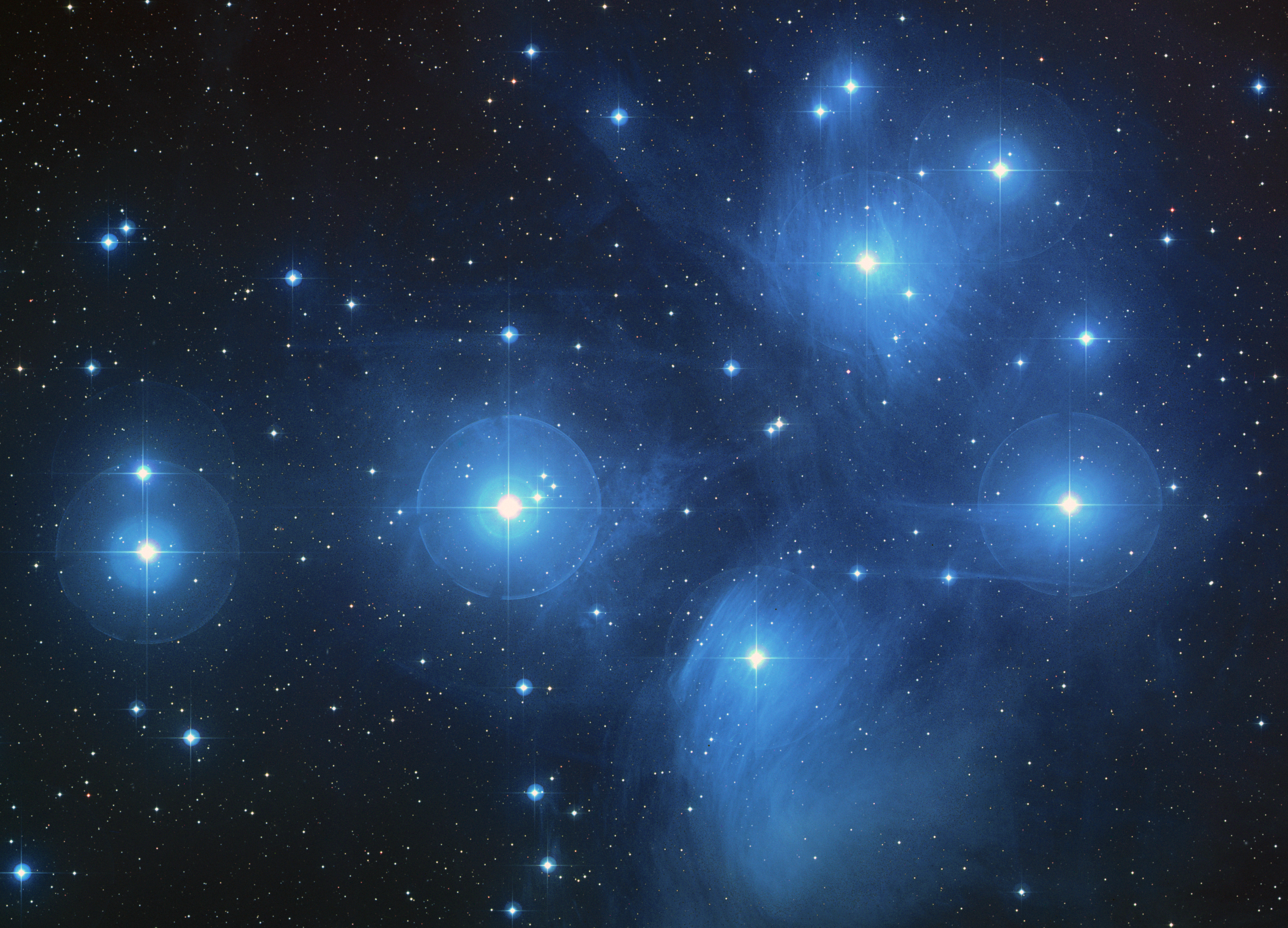
The Pleiades

In 1964, Jack Horkheimer started working at the Miami Space Transit Planetarium for the Miami Museum of Science after meeting the museum's president, Arthur Smith. By the early 1970s, he was appearing on news programs talking about astronomy. He was approached by Miami's PBS affiliate, WPBT, to do a series of half-hour programs about astronomy, titled Horkheimer's Heavens. Horkheimer agreed on the condition that WPBT help him create a series of 5-minute shows on stargazing. This was the beginning of Jack Horkheimer: Star Hustler.

The show debuted on November 6, 1976, on WPBT. From 1976 until 1985, the show was very studious, with Horkheimer being calm and speaking quietly like an educator rather than an entertainer. This changed in 1985 after the show's executive producer, Ed Waglin, told Horkheimer that he needed to appeal to a general audience, rather than to astronomers.

In May 1985, the show went national, being broadcast on PBS stations around the United States with the enthusiastic Horkheimer that most people are familiar with. For the first two years of the national broadcast, Horkheimer hated the show and would not watch it, saying, "Well this is certainly different from any Jack Horkheimer that I know." After that, Horkheimer realized that he was playing a character in order to generate enthusiasm for the show. The show started broadcasting in foreign markets in 1989.

From its inception until 1997, the show was named Jack Horkheimer: Star Hustler. With the rise of the Internet, however, viewers let the show's producers and WPBT know that, instead of the program's Web site showing up at the top of search results, search engines were giving results for the Hustler adult magazine. As a result, the producers renamed the show Star Gazer to avert any confusion, accidental or purposeful.

On August 20, 2010, Horkheimer died. For more than a year after Horkheimer's death, the program continued to be produced under the title Jack Horkheimer: Star Gazer, using the same opening sequence featuring Horkheimer's name and face. During that time, the program continued to use the same format with a series of guest hosts filling in for Horkheimer.

The show's theme music from its debut in 1976 until October 2011 was Isao Tomita's electronic rendition of Claude Debussy's Arabesque No. 1, from Tomita's album Snowflakes Are Dancing. According to the former Star Gazer website, this is the most frequently asked question the producers receive.

On October 3, 2011, the program's name was changed to Star Gazers. The show's new opening sequence featured a new logo and new theme music done in an alternative/progressive/space rock style (like Muse). With the name change, the program's format was also changed to include two, and later three, co-hosts who appeared together in each episode. A new Web site for the show was launched as well. The show still retains the old format of using green screens, and still ends with Horkeimer's closing phrase, "Keep Looking Up." For the show's 40th anniversary episode (October 31 – November 6, 2016) Tomita's version of Debussy's Arabesque No. 1 was used once again briefly as the show's theme music.

For more than four decades, the show's weekly episodes were produced in a five-minute length format. One-minute length versions of these episodes were also produced for public television stations which preferred that shorter format. Starting with the weekly episodes produced for the month of December 2019, South Florida PBS discontinued production in the five-minute length format in favor of the one-minute length format; the reason given was that the shorter one-minute length episodes would be more appealing for online viewing.

During the month of December 2019, South Florida PBS introduced evergreen segments, which were produced in addition to the regular weekly episodes. The evergreen segment was essentially a new type of episode which differed from the regular weekly episode in more than one way. The evergreen segments focused on enduring astronomical phenomena, while the regular weekly episodes focused more on time-sensitive information about current sky events. Evergreen segments were generally longer than the one-minute length of the regular weekly episodes, although usually shorter than five minutes. Unlike the regular weekly episodes, the evergreen segments were not intended for broadcast during any particular calendar week and could therefore be broadcast at any time due to the fact that their subject matter lacked expiration dates. Generally, the format and appearance of the evergreen segments resembled that of the discontinued five-minute format of the regular weekly episodes.

In September 2020, South Florida PBS started streaming virtual events from the Star Gazers website. Virtual events were special live Star Gazers episodes which were much longer (approximately an hour in length) than either the regular weekly episodes or the evergreen segments. These special live episodes focused on a single astronomical topic and featured interviews with experts. These virtual events used the same opening sequence which had been used with the weekly episodes which had been made in the five-minute format (before it had been discontinued). Current and past virtual events were available for viewing on the Star Gazers website.

On January 6, 2023, a digital-native format of Star Gazers premiered on South Florida PBS's YouTube channel. The medium-length episodes ranged from 1–5 minutes, exploring evergreen topics in a similar style to the retired 5-minute format. Unlike the typical Star Gazers broadcast, they are not shot on a green screen, and are instead filmed in a home studio with stock space footage. These digital-native episodes are also syndicated to other PBS stations and were nominated for a Suncoast Emmy in the category of Short Form Content under Environment/Science in 2023.

== Content ==
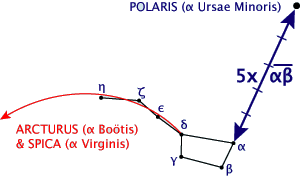
Finding Arcturus and Spica

The show educates viewers about astronomical events for the coming week and about astronomy and astronomical history in general. Viewers learn about various constellations and how to find different stars. Horkheimer used catchy phrases to help viewers remember the procedures for locating astronomical bodies. "Arc to Arcturus, speed on to Spica", was a common phrase used to define the technique to find Arcturus and Spica using the handle of the Big Dipper. Following the arc of the handle will lead to Arcturus as shown in the diagram.

Another method Horkheimer used to teach viewers about the stars was to tell stories about them. The Pleiades, for example, also known as the Seven Sisters, was an asterism and just one of the many objects in the night sky he would use in this way. Stars with unique names, such as Zubenelgenubi and Zubeneschamali were also used in the shows to help inform the viewers.

When astronomical events were in the news, Horkheimer would speak of them, giving viewers much more detailed information. When Comet Hale-Bopp arrived in 1997 and when Halley's Comet was visible in 1986, he did shows about them. In 1997, specific shows were made when Mars Pathfinder landed on Mars and when the spacecraft Galileo orbited Jupiter, both of which were major headlines in the news.

The show has many catchphrases that viewers associate with Horkheimer. Horkheimer's appearances on the show are always marked with his opening line, "Greetings, greetings, fellow star gazers!" and his signature closing line, "Keep looking up!" These are the most widely recognizable quotes from the show but there were also others in common usage throughout the series.

Horkheimer used "So get thee outside..." to encourage viewers to watch the stars. When describing the heavens he would often say "Let me show you." When introducing a picture of the night sky, he would often say, "O.K., we've got our skies set up for..." and then add a date and time.

Each Star Hustler episode began with the announcer, Big Wilson, reciting this poem as the host walked onto the set:

Some people hustle pool

Some people hustle cars

But, have you ever heard about

the man who hustles stars?

After Big Wilson's death in 1989, Star Hustler continued to use Wilson's pre-recorded voice in the television program's introduction as a "living memorial" to the man, with Horkheimer announcing the week's episode title. This introduction would be replaced 1997 with the show's change to Star Gazer; from 1997 to 2011, each Star Gazer episode began with the announcer reciting the following poem:

Confused about the cosmos,

Can't tell a planet from a star? Then give us just five minutes,

And we'll show you what they are.

== Production ==
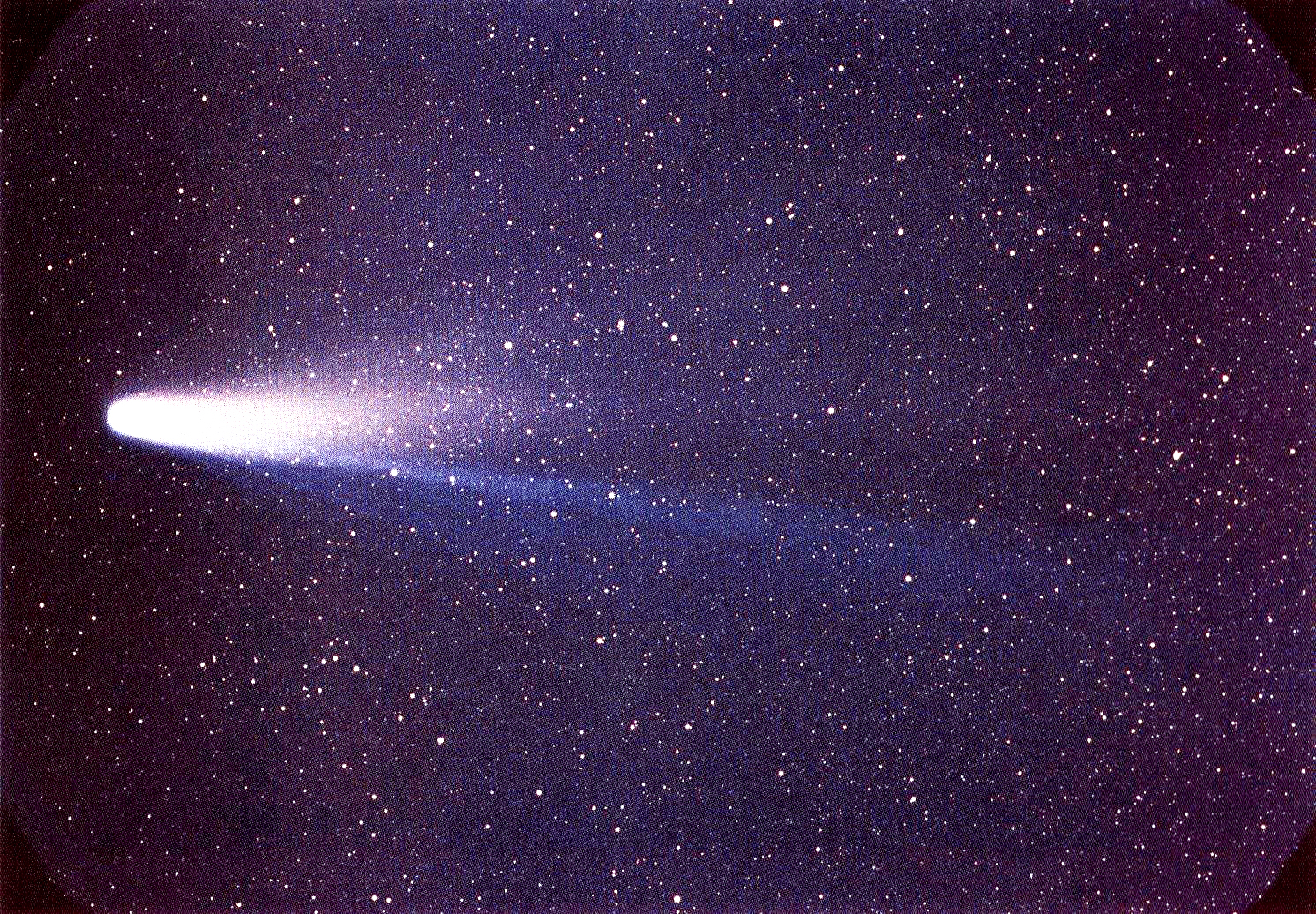
Halley's comet

The show is produced in advance and one month of episodes is transmitted to PBS stations and others approximately two weeks prior to broadcast. The show is broadcast on over 200 PBS stations. It is also available on NASA's Central Operation of Resources for Educators, VOA TV and the Armed Forces Network. Individuals can download the show free from the official website, view the program on YouTube or watch the show's video podcast feed through most podcast providers.

It was originally designed to air on PBS stations just before sign-off, but since many PBS stations now stay on the air continuously, the show usually airs around midnight local time or before a station or member network transitions to the overnight network schedule, and often again at the start of the broadcast day. Additionally, WPBT now provides a one-minute "capsule" version of each episode with a brief summary of the week's events.

Episodes usually featured Horkheimer in front of a green screen, where he appeared to stand on top of a planetary ring on one side of the screen. Horkheimer then uses the screen to illustrate starfields and diagrams appropriate to his subject.

== Hosts ==
Horkheimer was the creator, writer, and original host of the series until his death on August 20, 2010. Horkheimer created the series in 1976 in cooperation with WPBT. He had been creating presentations for the Miami Space Transit Planetarium when he started the series. Horkheimer often appeared on news programs to host astronomical events.

His final broadcast was for the week of August 30 to September 5, 2010, and can be seen at "Jack Horkheimer Star Gazer" 5 Minute Aug. 30 – Sept. 5, 2010 on YouTube. The show was his 1,708th episode and was titled, Celebrate Labor Day The Cosmic Way With A Giant Triangle Of Stars Overhead. The show was recorded approximately one month before Horkheimer's death.

Chris Trigg, the Energy Officer at the Miami Science Museum, temporarily took over the position as special guest host while Horkheimer was ill. Horkheimer had previously written episodes for the entire month of September 2010. Trigg stepped in and taped the episodes for that month to keep the show running. His first episode was the show's 1,709th titled, "Mercury In The Morning And Jupiter At Night", and can be seen at Jack Horkheimer Star Gazer 5 Minute Sept.6 – Sept. 12, 2010 on YouTube.

After Horkheimer's death, Trigg took over the position as host and recorded episodes for the months of October and November 2010. The episodes were written and produced by Bill Dishong. The episodes were uploaded to YouTube on September 22, 2010, and can be seen on the Miami Science Museum's channel here (Jack Horkheimer: Star Gazer's channel on YouTube). Jack Kelly announced in November 2010 that a national search for a new host would start in December 2010. Dean Regas was the first to try out and, in November 2010, filmed episodes for the month of December. Regas was given topics for future shows and asked to write scripts for the January shows of 2011. Regas went back in December and filmed the January episodes. Ed Romano, an amateur astronomer from Rhode Island, hosted the February 2011 episodes. James C. Albury, Coordinator of the Kika Silva Pla Planetarium at Santa Fe College in Gainesville, Florida, was the host for the month of April. Dean Regas returned as host for the months of March and May 2011.

In June 2011, Albury and Regas were named as permanent co-hosts. The September 2011 episodes ended with the announcement that the program would be appearing in October 2011 with the new name, "Star Gazers" and the new website stargazersonline.org. Marlene Hidalgo joined the program as its first female co-host in October 2011. Hidalgo was a high school science teacher who had spent more than a decade teaching to students with disabilities. Hidalgo moved with her family to the northeastern United States after making her last appearance on the program, which was broadcast in March 2014.

In 2019, South Florida PBS decided to try a different approach to producing the show. They wanted to shorten the regular weekly episodes to make them more appealing for online viewing. Before these changes were implemented, Albury and Regas continued to co-host the program until leaving the show following the recording of the episodes for November 2019. Trace Dominguez, an award-winning science communicator and educator, was named the permanent host; and his first appearance on the show was in December 2019. Ata Sarajedini, PhD of Florida Atlantic University was named as a series consultant.

== Episodes ==
There have been 49 seasons of Star Gazers and the show has produced more than 2,500 episodes as of January 2024. Horkheimer's last season was 2010 and he had hosted 1,708 broadcast episodes before his death.

== Home video releases ==
In addition to the weekly televised episodes of Star Gazers, anthologies of selected episodes from the series were released on four home videos. The titles of these episode collections were as follows.

=== Jack Horkheimer: Star Hustler videos ===
- Space Oddities (12 episodes)
- Tales of the Night Sky (12 episodes)

=== Jack Horkheimer: Star Gazer videos ===
- Video Almanac (16 episodes)
- Make the Stars Your Own (15 episodes)

== Awards and recognition ==
In 1994, Jack Horkheimer: Star Hustler won the Astronomical League's Outstanding Achievement Award. The award was mentioned in the closing credits of episodes released in 1995.

== See also ==
- The Sky at Night, a monthly television show on astronomy produced by the BBC
- SkyWeek, a weekly television show on astronomy
- The Sky Above Us, a television show on astronomy
- StarDate, a daily syndicated radio show highlighting upcoming celestial events
- White House Astronomy Night
