= Horkheimer (surname) =

Horkheimer is a toponymic surname of Ashkenazi Jewish origin, meaning "someone from Horkheim". Notable people with the surname include:

- H. M. Horkheimer (along with his brother, Elwood), proprietor of Balboa Amusement Producing Company
- Jack Horkheimer (1938–2010), American astronomer and television host
- Max Horkheimer (1895–1973), German philosopher and sociologist

== See also ==
- 11409 Horkheimer
