= Jack Horkheimer: Star Gazer (2001 season) =

- No. of episodes: 52

Release
- Original network: PBS
- Original release: January 1 – December 24, 2001

Season chronology
- ← Previous (2000 season) Next → (2002 season)

The 2001 season of the astronomy TV show Jack Horkheimer: Star Gazer starring Jack Horkheimer started on January 1, 2001. The show's episode numbering scheme changed several times during its run to coincide with major events in the show's history. The official Star Gazer website hosts the complete scripts for each of the shows.

== 2001 season ==
No. overall	No. in season	Title	Directed by	Written by	Original release date
1204	#01-01	"January Is ' How To Use Your New Telescope' Month"	--	Jack Horkheimer	January 1, 2001
1205	#01-02	"Which Season Is the Longest? And Which Is the Shortest? Spring, Summer, Autumn or Winter"	--	Jack Horkheimer	January 8, 2001
1206	#01-03	"The Moon Pays A Visit to the Two Inner Planets and How to Watch It"	--	Jack Horkheimer	January 15, 2001
1207	#01-04	"The Ground Hog Day Moon Visits Two Planets and A Venus Reminder"	--	Jack Horkheimer	January 22, 2001
1208	#01-05	"The Month of the Incredible UFO Planet!"	--	Jack Horkheimer	January 29, 2001
1209	#01-06	"The Closest and Biggest Full Moon Of 2001! And How to Find the Valentine's Day Star"	--	Jack Horkheimer	February 5, 2001
1210	#01-07	"Chilling Geometry: The Great Winter Triangle Inside the Great Winter Hexagon"	--	Jack Horkheimer	February 12, 2001
1211	#01-08	"Venus at Its Greatest Brilliancy! And An Exquisite Moon Makes Dramatic Sky Pictures With The Planets"	--	Jack Horkheimer	February 19, 2001
1212	#01-09	"The Wonderful Birthday Stars of the Winter Triangle"	--	Jack Horkheimer	February 26, 2001
1213	#01-10	"Venus Makes A Spectacular Exit and Entrance"	--	Jack Horkheimer	March 5, 2001
1214	#01-11	"The Red Planet Meets Its Red Rival!"	--	Jack Horkheimer	March 12, 2001
1215	#01-12	"Spring Right in Your Face! And The Last Good Moon/Jupiter/Saturn Get-Togethers"	--	Jack Horkheimer	March 19, 2001
1216	#01-13	"How To Use the Moon and Your Fingers to Measure Distances In the Night Sky"	--	Jack Horkheimer	March 26, 2001
1217	#01-14	"The Planet Mars Is Getting Ready To Back Up"	--	Jack Horkheimer	April 2, 2001
1218	#01-15	"The Horse on the Handle of the Big Dipper"	--	Jack Horkheimer	April 9, 2001
1219	#01-16	"Celebrate National Astronomy Day on Saturday April 28th! And The Moon Pays A Last Visit to Saturn and Jupiter"	--	Jack Horkheimer	April 16, 2001
1220	#01-17	"The Surprising and Amazing Truth About the North Star and How To Find It"	--	Jack Horkheimer	April 23, 2001
1221	#01-18	"The Pink Iron Planet Makes Its Best Evening Appearance of the Year! And Venus Makes Its Best Appearance as the Morning Star!"	--	Jack Horkheimer	April 30, 2001
1222	#01-19	"Mars Backs Up This Week! And Continues Racing Toward Earth!"	--	Jack Horkheimer	May 7, 2001
1223	#01-20	"Last Chance to See Jupiter; Mercury Meets the Moon; And the Hidden Splendor of Gemini"	--	Jack Horkheimer	May 14, 2001
1224	#01-21	"The Real and Magnificent Stars Which Mark The Heart and Tail of Leo the Lion"	--	Jack Horkheimer	May 21, 2001
1225	#01-22	"The Fabulous Summer of Mars"	--	Jack Horkheimer	May 28, 2001
1226	#01-23	"The Two 'Morning Stars' of June 2001!"	--	Jack Horkheimer	June 4, 2001
1227	#01-24	"Mars at Opposition This Week!! And An Exquisite Venus / Moon Visit"	--	Jack Horkheimer	June 11, 2001
1228	#01-25	"The Fabulous Summer Solstice of 2001! Mars At Its Closest in 13 Years! And The First Total Eclipse of the Sun of the Millennium"	--	Jack Horkheimer	June 18, 2001
1229	#01-26	"Earth Farthest From the Sun on The 4th Of July! The Moon Pays A Visit to Dazzling Mars! And A 4 Planet Pre-Dawn Tease!"	--	Jack Horkheimer	June 25, 2001
1230	#01-27	"The July 2001 Planet Show!"	--	Jack Horkheimer	July 2, 2001
1231	#01-28	"July's Fabulous Pre-Dawn Celestial Extravaganza!"	--	Jack Horkheimer	July 9, 2001
1232	#01-29	"Destination Vega: The Brightest Star of the Summer Triangle"	--	Jack Horkheimer	July 16, 2001
1233	#01-30	"Altair: The Weird but Wonderful Second Brightest Star of the Summer Triangle"	--	Jack Horkheimer	July 23, 2001
1234	#01-31	"A Spectacular Meeting Of the 2 Brightest Planets This Weekend And Mars Pulls Away From Antares"	--	Jack Horkheimer	July 30, 2001
1235	#01-32	"The Moon Visits 3 Bright Planets and Comes So Close To Venus It Will Take Your Breath Away!"	--	Jack Horkheimer	August 6, 2001
1236	#01-33	"Mars and The Two Marvelous Star Clusters That Ride Above the Scorpion's Tail"	--	Jack Horkheimer	August 13, 2001
1237	#01-34	"Planet George At Its Brightest and Closest To Earth This Week And How To Find It... Maybe"	--	Jack Horkheimer	August 20, 2001
1238	#01-35	"This Year's Strange Non-Harvest September Moon And Dueling Constellations"	--	Jack Horkheimer	August 27, 2001
1239	#01-36	"September's Morning and Evening Planet Show and The Rare Occultation of Saturn"	--	Jack Horkheimer	September 3, 2001
1240	#01-37	"How to find The 'False Dawn' Of Omar Khayyam... Next Week"	--	Jack Horkheimer	September 10, 2001
1241	#01-38	"Why Is the Summer Triangle Overhead on the First Night of Fall?"	--	Jack Horkheimer	September 17, 2001
1242	#01-39	"A 'Magic Trick' You Can Do With A Dime and The Harvest Moon"	--	Jack Horkheimer	September 24, 2001
1243	#01-40	"See the Milky Way and Its Brightest Constellations at Their Very Best Next Week Just After Dark"	--	Jack Horkheimer	October 1, 2001
1244	#01-41	"Some Favorite Stars and Why The Stars Change With The Seasons"	--	Jack Horkheimer	October 8, 2001
1245	#01-42	"The Last Full Moon On Halloween Until 2020 And the Seven Sisters"	--	Jack Horkheimer	October 15, 2001
1246	#01-43	"Two Side by Side Planets Glide Together for 11 Days in Pre-Dawn Skies"	--	Jack Horkheimer	October 22, 2001
1247	#01-44	"Five Pretty Planets for Your Perusal"	--	Jack Horkheimer	October 29, 2001
1248	#01-45	"Star Gazer Celebrates Its 25th Anniversary! The Leonid Meteor Shower May Turn Into A Meteor Storm! And An Announcement About Mars You Won't Believe!"	--	Jack Horkheimer	November 5, 2001
1249	#01-46	"The Moon Meets Mars On Thanksgiving Eve and Our Annual '3 Cosmic Birds For Thanksgiving' Show"	--	Jack Horkheimer	November 12, 2001
1250	#01-47	"How To Find Uranus by Using Mars and Watching the Full Moon Occult the Ringed Planet Saturn"	--	Jack Horkheimer	November 19, 2001
1251	#01-48	"Saturn at Its Best Since The 70's and The Moon Pays A Visit to Jupiter"	--	Jack Horkheimer	November 26, 2001
1252	#01-49	"The Only Known Asteroid Shower Visits Earth Next Week! And How to Watch It"	--	Jack Horkheimer	December 3, 2001
1253	#01-50	"Three Exquisite Star Clusters and How to See Them"	--	Jack Horkheimer	December 10, 2001
1254	#01-51	"The First Day Of Winter And Why The Shortest Day Of The Year Doesn't Feel Like The Shortest"	--	Jack Horkheimer	December 17, 2001
1255	#01-52	"A Full Moon and The King of the Planets at Its Brightest and Closest Overhead at Midnight on New Year's Eve!"	--	Jack Horkheimer	December 24, 2001
