= Jack Horkheimer: Star Gazer (2006 season) =

- No. of episodes: 52

Release
- Original network: PBS
- Original release: January 2 – December 25, 2006

Season chronology
- ← Previous (2005 season) Next → (2007 season)

The 2006 season of the astronomy TV show Jack Horkheimer: Star Gazer starring Jack Horkheimer started on January 2, 2006. The show's episode numbering scheme changed several times during its run to coincide with major events in the show's history. The official Star Gazer website hosts the complete scripts for each of the shows.

== 2006 season ==
| No. overall | No. in season | Title | Directed by | Written by | Original release date |
|---|---|---|---|---|---|
| 1465 | #06-01 | "Fasten Your Seat Belts Because Earth Is Closest To The Sun And At Its Fastest This Week!" | -- | Jack Horkheimer | January 2, 2006 |
| 1466 | #06-02 | "The Moon Visits Saturn At Its Best And Jupiter Visits The Scorpion's Claw" | -- | Jack Horkheimer | January 9, 2006 |
| 1467 | #06-03 | "How To See Something 20,000 Times The Size Of Our Solar System With Just The Naked Eye" | -- | Jack Horkheimer | January 16, 2006 |
| 1468 | #06-04 | "Saturn At Its Closest, Biggest And Brightest For The Entire Year This Week!" | -- | Jack Horkheimer | January 23, 2006 |
| 1469 | #06-05 | "The Moon Pays A Visit To A Red Planet And A Red Star" | -- | Jack Horkheimer | January 30, 2006 |
| 1470 | #06-06 | "Make This Valentine's Day Cosmic With A Gift Of Stars And Planets" | -- | Jack Horkheimer | February 6, 2006 |
| 1471 | #06-07 | "Venus: February's 'Super Star' Planet Will Wow You!" | -- | Jack Horkheimer | February 13, 2006 |
| 1472 | #06-08 | "Super Size My Syzygy And Perigee, Please! And Mercury At Its Best For 2006" | -- | Jack Horkheimer | February 20, 2006 |
| 1473 | #06-09 | "How To Find The Gemini Twins And Their Sensational Siblings" | -- | Jack Horkheimer | February 27, 2006 |
| 1474 | #06-10 | "Canis Major And Canis Minor: Orion The Hunter's Two Wonderful Dogs" | -- | Jack Horkheimer | March 6, 2006 |
| 1475 | #06-11 | "Why Does The Sun Rise And Set Over The Yellow Line In The Middle Of the Road On The First Day Of Spring?" | -- | Jack Horkheimer | March 13, 2006 |
| 1476 | #06-12 | "Leo The Lion Chases Orion Out Of Springtime Skies" | -- | Jack Horkheimer | March 20, 2006 |
| 1477 | #06-13 | "A Rare Meeting Of The Moon And The Seven Sisters Plus The Moon Visits Two Planets" | -- | Jack Horkheimer | March 27, 2006 |
| 1478 | #06-14 | "April Showers Bring May Flowers And Our Annual Big Dipper Game" | -- | Jack Horkheimer | April 3, 2006 |
| 1479 | #06-15 | "Venus Visits A Planet Named George 3 Nights In A Row" | -- | Jack Horkheimer | April 10, 2006 |
| 1480 | #06-16 | "The Moon And Venus Make An Awesome Pair And Jupiter Sidles Up To the Scorpion's Claw!" | -- | Jack Horkheimer | April 17, 2006 |
| 1481 | #06-17 | "Celebrate National Astronomy Day Saturday May 6th! The Biggest And Best Yet!" | -- | Jack Horkheimer | April 24, 2006 |
| 1482 | #06-18 | "Jupiter At Its Closest, Biggest And Brightest This Week! Plus Don't Forget National Astronomy Day This Saturday!" | -- | Jack Horkheimer | May 1, 2006 |
| 1483 | #06-19 | "The Horse On The Handle Of The Big Dipper" | -- | Jack Horkheimer | May 8, 2006 |
| 1484 | #06-20 | "The Moon Pays A Visit To The Brightest And Dimmest Of The Naked Eye Planets" | -- | Jack Horkheimer | May 15, 2006 |
| 1485 | #06-21 | "The Moon Visits Three Planets Starting This Memorial Day Weekend" | -- | Jack Horkheimer | May 22, 2006 |
| 1486 | #06-22 | "Watch Mars And Saturn Approach Each Other For A Super Close Meeting On June 17th! Plus Mercury Prepares For Its Own Summer Show" | -- | Jack Horkheimer | May 29, 2006 |
| 1487 | #06-23 | "Celebrate Day-Star Day Saturday Morning June 17th!" | -- | Jack Horkheimer | June 5, 2006 |
| 1488 | #06-24 | "Mars And Saturn Almost Slam Into Each Other This Weekend" | -- | Jack Horkheimer | June 12, 2006 |
| 1489 | #06-25 | "Star Gazing On The First Nights Of Summer" | -- | Jack Horkheimer | June 19, 2006 |
| 1490 | #06-26 | "Four Planets And A Bright Star All In A Row For The 4th Of July" | -- | Jack Horkheimer | June 26, 2006 |
| 1491 | #06-27 | "Earth At Aphelion This Week And Last Chance To See Saturn" | -- | Jack Horkheimer | July 3, 2006 |
| 1492 | #06-28 | "How to Find Two Cat's Eyes In Summer's Skies" | -- | Jack Horkheimer | July 10, 2006 |
| 1493 | #06-29 | "The Red Planet Mars And The Blue Heart Star Of Leo Pair Up This Weekend!" | -- | Jack Horkheimer | July 17, 2006 |
| 1494 | #06-30 | "Use The Moon To Find The Largest Planet And A Super Large Star" | -- | Jack Horkheimer | July 24, 2006 |
| 1495 | #06-31 | "See The Two Planets Closest To The Sun Side By Side" | -- | Jack Horkheimer | July 31, 2006 |
| 1496 | #06-32 | "How To Watch This Weekend's Perseid Meteor Shower Which Is Usually The Best Of The Year" | -- | Jack Horkheimer | August 7, 2006 |
| 1497 | #06-33 | "A Pre-Dawn Planet Cluster Awaits You Next Week" | -- | Jack Horkheimer | August 14, 2006 |
| 1498 | #06-34 | "Another Chance To Use The Moon To Find The Largest Planet And A Super large Star" | -- | Jack Horkheimer | August 21, 2006 |
| 1499 | #06-35 | "The Closest Full Moon Of The Year, Farthest Moon Of The Year And Use The Moon To Find Antares" | -- | Jack Horkheimer | August 28, 2006 |
| 1500 | #06-36 | "The 1500th Episode Of Star Gazer And The Return Of The False Dawn Of Omar Khayyam" | -- | Jack Horkheimer | September 4, 2006 |
| 1501 | #06-37 | "Get Up With The Chickens And Use The Moon To Find Two Planets And A Star" | -- | Jack Horkheimer | September 11, 2006 |
| 1502 | #06-38 | "How To Find The Only Planet Visible In Evening Skies Using The Crescent Moon" | -- | Jack Horkheimer | September 18, 2006 |
| 1503 | #06-39 | "Autumn's Great Cosmic Square Replaces Summer's Great Cosmic Triangle" | -- | Jack Horkheimer | September 25, 2006 |
| 1504 | #06-40 | "Stars For An Indian Summer" | -- | Jack Horkheimer | October 2, 2006 |
| 1505 | #06-41 | "Use the Moon To Find The Heart And The Tail Of Leo The Lion And The Ringed Planet" | -- | Jack Horkheimer | October 9, 2006 |
| 1506 | #06-42 | "Halloween And The Seven Sisters And The End Of The World" | -- | Jack Horkheimer | October 16, 2006 |
| 1507 | #06-43 | "The Biggest Planet Dazzles And The Smallest Planet Takes A Journey Across The Face Of The Sun" | -- | Jack Horkheimer | October 23, 2006 |
| 1508 | #06-44 | "Looking Back In Time 30, 40 And 2 1/2 Million Years Ago" | -- | Jack Horkheimer | October 30, 2006 |
| 1509 | #06-45 | "The Moon, A Planet And A Star Line Up In A Row This Sunday Morning" | -- | Jack Horkheimer | November 6, 2006 |
| 1510 | #06-46 | "Get Ready For This Weekend's Leonid Meteor Shower" | -- | Jack Horkheimer | November 13, 2006 |
| 1511 | #06-47 | "Mercury Begins A Super Show This Weekend And Three Cosmic Birds For Thanksgiving" | -- | Jack Horkheimer | November 20, 2006 |
| 1512 | #06-48 | "Mark This Second Week Of December As Super Planet Meeting Of 2006!" | -- | Jack Horkheimer | November 27, 2006 |
| 1513 | #06-49 | "Don't Miss This Weekend's Super Planet Meeting! A Once In 50 Years Happening" | -- | Jack Horkheimer | December 4, 2006 |
| 1514 | #06-50 | "Why The Shortest Day Of The Year Doesn't Feel Like The Shortest Day Of The Year" | -- | Jack Horkheimer | December 11, 2006 |
| 1515 | #06-51 | "What Do The Stars And Planets Have To Do With Santa Claus This Christmas Eve" | -- | Jack Horkheimer | December 18, 2006 |
| 1516 | #06-52 | "Celebrate New Year's Eve Again With The New Year's Eve Star" | -- | Jack Horkheimer | December 25, 2006 |
