= Jack Horkheimer: Star Gazer (2004 season) =

Season of television series

- No. of episodes: 52

Release
- Original network: PBS
- Original release: January 5 – December 27, 2004

Season chronology
- ← Previous (2003 season) Next → (2005 season)

The 2004 season of the astronomy TV show Jack Horkheimer: Star Gazer starring Jack Horkheimer started on January 5, 2004. The show's episode numbering scheme changed several times during its run to coincide with major events in the show's history. The official Star Gazer website hosts the complete scripts for each of the shows.

== 2004 season ==
No. overall	No. in season	Title	Directed by	Written by	Original release date
1361	#04-01	"Four Bright Planets Dazzle January Evenings Plus An Easy Way To Find The 7th Planet"	--	Jack Horkheimer	January 5, 2004
1362	#04-02	"Orion And His Rival Plus The Moon Meets Antares"	--	Jack Horkheimer	January 12, 2004
1363	#04-03	"2 Super Meetings: Our Moon With Venus And Our Moon With Mars"	--	Jack Horkheimer	January 19, 2004
1364	#04-04	"The 6th Planet Runs Rings Around Punxsutawney Phil On Groundhog Day Night"	--	Jack Horkheimer	January 26, 2004
1365	#04-05	"How To Find The Brightest And Most Jewel-like Star In The Night Sky"	--	Jack Horkheimer	February 2, 2004
1366	#04-06	"The Goddess Of Love And The Valentine's Day Star"	--	Jack Horkheimer	February 9, 2004
1367	#04-07	"Our Nearest Neighbor Pays A Visit To Three Early Evening Planets"	--	Jack Horkheimer	February 16, 2004
1368	#04-08	"The King Of The Planets At Its Biggest And Brightest For 2004 Meets The King Of The Constellations!"	--	Jack Horkheimer	February 23, 2004
1369	#04-09	"Orion's Belt: Three Of My Favorite Stars With Really Nifty names"	--	Jack Horkheimer	March 1, 2004
1370	#04-10	"The Astronomical Explanation For The Vernal Equinox And Why The Yellow Line In The Middle Of The Road Is So Much Fun On The First Day Of Spring"	--	Jack Horkheimer	March 8, 2004
1371	#04-11	"All Five Naked Eye Planets Visible At The Same Time The Last Week Of March. Plus Each One is Visited By The Moon"	--	Jack Horkheimer	March 15, 2004
1372	#04-12	"The Goddess Of Love Pays A Visit To The Seven Sisters"	--	Jack Horkheimer	March 22, 2004
1373	#04-13	"Two Celestial Signs Of Spring: A High Flyin' Lion And A Low Lyin' Orion"	--	Jack Horkheimer	March 29, 2004
1374	#04-14	"Arcturus To Spica: Two Super Stars And How To Find Them As Easy As "Big Dipper" Pie!"	--	Jack Horkheimer	April 5, 2004
1375	#04-15	"Celebrate National Astronomy Day Saturday April 24th And Watch The Moon Visit Three Planets During Astronomy Week"	--	Jack Horkheimer	April 12, 2004
1376	#04-16	"Celebrate National Astronomy Day This Saturday Plus The King Of The Planets Meets The King Of The Beasts And The Moon Visits Both"	--	Jack Horkheimer	April 19, 2004
1377	#04-17	"Venus Has Its Best Year Since 1882! And Reaches Its Greatest Brilliancy This Sunday May 2nd!"	--	Jack Horkheimer	April 26, 2004
1378	#04-18	"A 'NEAT' Little Comet For Your Weekend Viewing... Maybe!"	--	Jack Horkheimer	May 3, 2004
1379	#04-19	"A Waxing Moon Visits Three Planets And the Gemini Twins"	--	Jack Horkheimer	May 10, 2004
1380	#04-20	"A First Quarter Moon Revisits The King Of The Planets And The King Of The Beasts Plus Catch Venus Before It Disappears!"	--	Jack Horkheimer	May 17, 2004
1381	#04-21	"The Biggest Full Moon Of The Year Rides Across The Sky With One Have The Biggest Stars In Our Galaxy"	--	Jack Horkheimer	May 24, 2004
1382	#04-22	"Venus Crosses The Sun! A Rare Cosmic Spectacle No Living Human Has Ever Seen"	--	Jack Horkheimer	May 31, 2004
1383	#04-23	"Star Gazing On The Shortest Nights of the Year"	--	Jack Horkheimer	June 7, 2004
1384	#04-24	"Celebrate Day Star Day! On The Summer Solstice This Sunday, June 20th"	--	Jack Horkheimer	June 14, 2004
1385	#04-25	"The 'Three Tenors' Of Summer: A Stellar Trio To Brighten Your Nights!"	--	Jack Horkheimer	June 21, 2004
1386	#04-26	"The Earth At Aphelion And Two Super Close Meetings Of Four Cosmic Goodies"	--	Jack Horkheimer	June 28, 2004
1387	#04-27	"Next Week The Morning Star Reaches Its Greatest Brilliancy"	--	Jack Horkheimer	July 5, 2004
1388	#04-28	"Planet Hopping With the Moon This July!"	--	Jack Horkheimer	July 12, 2004
1389	#04-29	"The Moon Visits My Favorite Summer Star And Constellation!"	--	Jack Horkheimer	July 19, 2004
1390	#04-30	"How To Find The Heart Of The Scorpion And The Heart Of Our Galaxy With A Cosmic Bow And Arrow"	--	Jack Horkheimer	July 26, 2004
1391	#04-31	"Don't Miss Next Week's Annual Perseid Meteor Shower"	--	Jack Horkheimer	August 2, 2004
1392	#04-32	"Jupiter Cozies Up To The Moon And The False Dawn Of Omar Khayyam"	--	Jack Horkheimer	August 9, 2004
1393	#04-33	"The Moon Pays A Super Close Visit To A Humongous Star And Two Cat's Eyes Stare In Summer Skies"	--	Jack Horkheimer	August 16, 2004
1394	#04-34	"The 2nd And The 6th Planet Have A Super Close Meeting On Aug. 31st And Sept. 1st"	--	Jack Horkheimer	August 23, 2004
1395	#04-35	"September 10th Is the Day When The Moon, Venus and Saturn Form A Super Triangle And Mercury Bumps Into The Heart Of The Lion"	--	Jack Horkheimer	August 30, 2004
1396	#04-36	"The World Will Not End On Sept. 29th! Even Though A Rather Large Asteroid Will Make Its Closest Approach"	--	Jack Horkheimer	September 6, 2004
1397	#04-37	"Next Week's Autumnal Equinox: What It's Really All About And One Very Obvious Effect It Will Have On You"	--	Jack Horkheimer	September 13, 2004
1398	#04-38	"The Five Nights Of The Harvest Moon! And Two Fun Things You Can Do With It!"	--	Jack Horkheimer	September 20, 2004
1399	#04-39	"The Goddess of Love Pays A Super Close Visit To The Heart Of Leo The Lion And An Old Moon Makes A Foursome With Saturn And Gemini"	--	Jack Horkheimer	September 27, 2004
1400	#04-40	"Autumn's Great Cosmic Square Replaces Summer's Great Cosmic Triangle"	--	Jack Horkheimer	October 4, 2004
1401	#04-41	"A Tale Of Two Planets: Get Ready For A Super Close Meeting Of The Two Brightest"	--	Jack Horkheimer	October 11, 2004
1402	#04-42	"Don't Miss October 27th's 'Eclipse of The Hunter's Moon' Because It Will Be The Last Total Lunar Eclipse For 2 1/2 Years"	--	Jack Horkheimer	October 18, 2004
1403	#04-43	"Don't Miss Next Week's Super Close Meeting Of The Two Brightest Planets Followed By An Exquisite Visit To Each By A Very Old Moon"	--	Jack Horkheimer	October 25, 2004
1404	#04-44	"Star Gazer Turns 28 And The Moon Visits Three Planets And A Lovely Star In Predawn Skies"	--	Jack Horkheimer	November 1, 2004
1405	#04-45	"Leo The Lion's Meteor Shower Will Definitely Not Roar This Year But You May Find It A-meew-zing"	--	Jack Horkheimer	November 8, 2004
1406	#04-46	"The Lord Of The Rings And The Gemini Twins"	--	Jack Horkheimer	November 15, 2004
1407	#04-47	"A Full Beaver Moon And Three Cosmic Birds For Thanksgiving Weekend"	--	Jack Horkheimer	November 22, 2004
1408	#04-48	"Venus Has A Super Close Meeting With Mars And The Moon Plays 'Hide The Biggest Planet'"	--	Jack Horkheimer	November 29, 2004
1409	#04-49	"How To Watch Next Week's Geminid Asteroid Meteor Shower"	--	Jack Horkheimer	December 6, 2004
1410	#04-50	"The Winter Solstice And Why The Shortest Day Of The Year Doesn't Feel Like The Shortest Day Of the Year"	--	Jack Horkheimer	December 13, 2004
1411	#04-51	"A Spectacular Early Morning Sky Show For The Holidays!"	--	Jack Horkheimer	December 20, 2004
1412	#04-52	"Celebrate New Year's Eve With The New Year's Eve Star"	--	Jack Horkheimer	December 27, 2004
