= Jack Horkheimer: Star Hustler (1985 season) =

- No. of episodes: 52

Release
- Original network: PBS
- Original release: January 7 – December 30, 1985

Season chronology
- ← Previous (1984 season) Next → (1986 season)

The 1985 season of the astronomy TV show Jack Horkheimer: Star Hustler starring Jack Horkheimer started on January 1, 1985. During this season, the show still had its original name, Jack Horkheimer: Star Hustler. The show's episode numbering scheme changed several times during its run to coincide with major events in the show's history. The official Star Gazer website hosts the complete scripts for each of the shows.

== 1985 season ==
No. overall	No. in season	Title	Directed by	Written by	Original release date
370	#	"--"	--	Jack Horkheimer	January 7, 1985
371	#	"--"	--	Jack Horkheimer	January 14, 1985
372	#	"--"	--	Jack Horkheimer	January 21, 1985
373	#	"--"	--	Jack Horkheimer	January 28, 1985
374	#	"--"	--	Jack Horkheimer	February 4, 1985
375	#	"--"	--	Jack Horkheimer	February 11, 1985
376	#	"--"	--	Jack Horkheimer	February 18, 1985
377	#	"--"	--	Jack Horkheimer	February 25, 1985
378	#	"--"	--	Jack Horkheimer	March 4, 1985
379	#	"--"	--	Jack Horkheimer	March 11, 1985
380	#	"--"	--	Jack Horkheimer	March 18, 1985
381	#	"--"	--	Jack Horkheimer	March 25, 1985
382	#	"--"	--	Jack Horkheimer	April 1, 1985
383	#	"--"	--	Jack Horkheimer	April 8, 1985
384	#	"--"	--	Jack Horkheimer	April 15, 1985
385	#	"--"	--	Jack Horkheimer	April 22, 1985
386	#	"--"	--	Jack Horkheimer	April 29, 1985
387	#	"--"	--	Jack Horkheimer	May 6, 1985
388	#	"--"	--	Jack Horkheimer	May 13, 1985
389	#	"--"	--	Jack Horkheimer	May 20, 1985
390	#	"--"	--	Jack Horkheimer	May 27, 1985
391	#	"--"	--	Jack Horkheimer	June 3, 1985
392	#	"--"	--	Jack Horkheimer	June 10, 1985
393	#	"--"	--	Jack Horkheimer	June 17, 1985
394	#	"--"	--	Jack Horkheimer	June 24, 1985
395	#	"--"	--	Jack Horkheimer	July 1, 1985
396	#	"--"	--	Jack Horkheimer	July 8, 1985
397	#	"--"	--	Jack Horkheimer	July 15, 1985
398	#	"--"	--	Jack Horkheimer	July 22, 1985
399	#	"--"	--	Jack Horkheimer	July 29, 1985
400	#	"--"	--	Jack Horkheimer	August 5, 1985
401	#	"--"	--	Jack Horkheimer	August 12, 1985
402	#	"The Centaur's Secret Revealed & Tipping Tea on a Terrible Tail"	--	Jack Horkheimer	August 19, 1985
403	#	"Getting Ready for the Extremely Rare Event of Wednesday, September 4th... The Day when Two Planets Become One"	--	Jack Horkheimer	August 26, 1985
404	#	"--"	--	Jack Horkheimer	September 2, 1985
405	#	"--"	--	Jack Horkheimer	September 9, 1985
406	#	"--"	--	Jack Horkheimer	September 16, 1985
407	#	"--"	--	Jack Horkheimer	September 23, 1985
408	#	"--"	--	Jack Horkheimer	September 30, 1985
409	#	"--"	--	Jack Horkheimer	October 7, 1985
410	#	"--"	--	Jack Horkheimer	October 14, 1985
411	#	"Happy Birthday (Maybe), Edmund Halley; and When the Moon becomes a Pumpkin"	--	Jack Horkheimer	October 21, 1985
412	#	"--"	--	Jack Horkheimer	October 28, 1985
413	#	"--"	--	Jack Horkheimer	November 4, 1985
414	#	"--"	--	Jack Horkheimer	November 11, 1985
415	#	"--"	--	Jack Horkheimer	November 18, 1985
416	#	"--"	--	Jack Horkheimer	November 25, 1985
417	#	"--"	--	Jack Horkheimer	December 2, 1985
418	#	"--"	--	Jack Horkheimer	December 9, 1985
419	#	"--"	--	Jack Horkheimer	December 16, 1985
420	#	"--"	--	Jack Horkheimer	December 23, 1985
421	#	"--"	--	Jack Horkheimer	December 30, 1985
