= Jack Horkheimer: Star Hustler (1995 season) =

- No. of episodes: 52

Release
- Original network: PBS
- Original release: January 2 – December 25, 1995

Season chronology
- ← Previous (1994 season) Next → (1996 season)

The 1995 season of the astronomy TV show Jack Horkheimer: Star Hustler starring Jack Horkheimer started on January 2, 1995. During this season, the show still had its original name, Jack Horkheimer: Star Hustler. The show's episode numbering scheme changed several times during its run to coincide with major events in the show's history.

== 1995 season ==
No. overall	No. in season	Title	Directed by	Written by	Original release date
891	#284	"--"	--	Jack Horkheimer	January 2, 1995
892	#285	"--"	--	Jack Horkheimer	January 9, 1995
893	#286	"--"	--	Jack Horkheimer	January 16, 1995
894	#287	"--"	--	Jack Horkheimer	January 23, 1995
895	#288	"--"	--	Jack Horkheimer	January 30, 1995
896	#289	"--"	--	Jack Horkheimer	February 6, 1995
897	#290	"--"	--	Jack Horkheimer	February 13, 1995
898	#291	"--"	--	Jack Horkheimer	February 20, 1995
899	#292	"--"	--	Jack Horkheimer	February 27, 1995
900	#293	"--"	--	Jack Horkheimer	March 6, 1995
901	#294	"--"	--	Jack Horkheimer	March 13, 1995
902	#295	"--"	--	Jack Horkheimer	March 20, 1995
903	#296	"--"	--	Jack Horkheimer	March 27, 1995
904	#297	"--"	--	Jack Horkheimer	April 3, 1995
905	#298	"--"	--	Jack Horkheimer	April 10, 1995
906	#299	"--"	--	Jack Horkheimer	April 17, 1995
907	#300	"--"	--	Jack Horkheimer	April 24, 1995
908	#301	"--"	--	Jack Horkheimer	May 1, 1995
909	#302	"--"	--	Jack Horkheimer	May 8, 1995
910	#303	"--"	--	Jack Horkheimer	May 15, 1995
911	#304	"--"	--	Jack Horkheimer	May 22, 1995
912	#305	"The Many Marvelous Moons of the Year"	--	Jack Horkheimer	May 29, 1995
913	#306	"--"	--	Jack Horkheimer	June 5, 1995
914	#307	"--"	--	Jack Horkheimer	June 12, 1995
915	#308	"--"	--	Jack Horkheimer	June 19, 1995
916	#309	"--"	--	Jack Horkheimer	June 26, 1995
917	#310	"--"	--	Jack Horkheimer	July 3, 1995
918	#311	"--"	--	Jack Horkheimer	July 10, 1995
919	#312	"--"	--	Jack Horkheimer	July 17, 1995
920	#313	"--"	--	Jack Horkheimer	July 24, 1995
921	#314	"--"	--	Jack Horkheimer	July 31, 1995
922	#315	"--"	--	Jack Horkheimer	August 7, 1995
923	#316	"--"	--	Jack Horkheimer	August 14, 1995
924	#317	"--"	--	Jack Horkheimer	August 21, 1995
925	#318	"--"	--	Jack Horkheimer	August 28, 1995
926	#319	"--"	--	Jack Horkheimer	September 4, 1995
927	#320	"--"	--	Jack Horkheimer	September 11, 1995
928	#321	"--"	--	Jack Horkheimer	September 18, 1995
929	#322	"--"	--	Jack Horkheimer	September 25, 1995
930	#323	"--"	--	Jack Horkheimer	October 2, 1995
931	#324	"--"	--	Jack Horkheimer	October 9, 1995
932	#325	"--"	--	Jack Horkheimer	October 16, 1995
933	#326	"--"	--	Jack Horkheimer	October 23, 1995
934	#327	"--"	--	Jack Horkheimer	October 30, 1995
935	#328	"--"	--	Jack Horkheimer	November 6, 1995
936	#329	"--"	--	Jack Horkheimer	November 13, 1995
937	#330	"--"	--	Jack Horkheimer	November 20, 1995
938	#331	"--"	--	Jack Horkheimer	November 27, 1995
939	#332	"--"	--	Jack Horkheimer	December 4, 1995
940	#333	"--"	--	Jack Horkheimer	December 11, 1995
941	#334	"--"	--	Jack Horkheimer	December 18, 1995
942	#335	"--"	--	Jack Horkheimer	December 25, 1995
