= Jack Horkheimer: Star Gazer (2009 season) =

- No. of episodes: 52

Release
- Original network: PBS
- Original release: January 5 – December 28, 2009

Season chronology
- ← Previous (2008 season) Next → (2010 season)

The 2009 season of the astronomy TV show Jack Horkheimer: Star Gazer starring Jack Horkheimer started on January 5, 2009. This season was Jack Horkheimer's last full season as host of the program. The show's episode numbering scheme changed several times during its run to coincide with major events in the show's history. The official Star Gazer website hosts the complete scripts for each of the shows.

== 2009 season ==
No. overall	No. in season	Title	Directed by	Written by	Original release date
1622	#09-01	"See Three Cosmic Seasons At The Same Time!"	--	Jack Horkheimer	January 5, 2009
1623	#09-02	"Saturn's Incredible Shrinking Rings: See Them At Their Skinniest For 15 Years"	--	Jack Horkheimer	January 12, 2009
1624	#09-03	"The Moon Plays Tag With Venus And Orion's Two Brilliant Bow Wows!"	--	Jack Horkheimer	January 19, 2009
1625	#09-04	"If Punxsutawney Phil Gets Up Before Sunrise On Groundhog Day What Will He See?"	--	Jack Horkheimer	January 26, 2009
1626	#09-05	"The Goddess Of Love And The Valentine's Day Star Await Your Viewing Valentine's Night"	--	Jack Horkheimer	February 2, 2009
1627	#09-06	"Next Week's 'Triple Planet And Moon' Sky Show For The Early Birds"	--	Jack Horkheimer	February 9, 2009
1628	#09-07	"The Great Cosmic Light Called Hesperus, Brother Of Lucifer, Reaches Greatest Brilliancy"	--	Jack Horkheimer	February 16, 2009
1629	#09-08	"What Does That Old Saying 'In Like A Lion, Out Like A Lamb' Have To Do With The Cosmos?"	--	Jack Horkheimer	February 23, 2009
1630	#09-09	"Saturn At Its Closest, Biggest And Brightest For 2009 And A Many-Names-Moon Pays It And Regulus A Visit"	--	Jack Horkheimer	March 2, 2009
1631	#09-10	"Happy First Day Of Spring! And Happy New Year Ben & George!"	--	Jack Horkheimer	March 9, 2009
1632	#09-11	"How To Find Planets #4 And #5 With Satellite #1 Plus Planet #2 Masquerades As Both The Evening And Morning Star"	--	Jack Horkheimer	March 16, 2009
1633	#09-12	"How To Find The Two Brightest Stars, Which Are Visible Right Now!"	--	Jack Horkheimer	March 23, 2009
1634	#09-13	"Our Annual 'Fun And Games With The Big Dipper' Demo"	--	Jack Horkheimer	March 30, 2009
1635	#09-14	"See Planet #1 At Its Very Best For The Entire Year"	--	Jack Horkheimer	April 6, 2009
1636	#09-15	"Moon Hop To Find Jupiter, Venus And Mars And An Occult Occurrence For Some Of You"	--	Jack Horkheimer	April 13, 2009
1637	#09-16	"Mercury At Its Best For 2009 Joined By The Moon And The Seven Sisters Plus Celebrate National Astronomy Day On Saturday May 2nd"	--	Jack Horkheimer	April 20, 2009
1638	#09-17	"Use The Moon This Astronomy Day Weekend To Find Springtime's Leo The Lion And Everyone's Favorite, Saturn"	--	Jack Horkheimer	April 27, 2009
1639	#09-18	"How To Use The Closest Star To Earth Other Than Our Sun And The Fabled Southern Cross"	--	Jack Horkheimer	May 4, 2009
1640	#09-19	"The Moon Visits Three Bright Planets In Pre-Dawn Skies Plus An Invisible Goodie"	--	Jack Horkheimer	May 11, 2009
1641	#09-20	"How To Make This Memorial Day Weekend A Star Studded Event!"	--	Jack Horkheimer	May 18, 2009
1642	#09-21	"How To Find The Last Of The Planets Using The King Of The Planets"	--	Jack Horkheimer	May 25, 2009
1643	#09-22	"How to Find The Two Largest Planets Using The Moon As A Finder"	--	Jack Horkheimer	June 1, 2009
1644	#09-23	"Join Us In Our Annual Day Star Day Celebration This Summer Solstice Weekend"	--	Jack Horkheimer	June 8, 2009
1645	#09-24	"Mars And Venus Are At Their Closest On The Summer Solstice, The First Day Of Summer!"	--	Jack Horkheimer	June 15, 2009
1646	#09-25	"The Wonderful Stars Of Summer And How To Find Them"	--	Jack Horkheimer	June 22, 2009
1647	#09-26	"Earth At Aphelion On The 4th Of July And The Reason For The Seasons"	--	Jack Horkheimer	June 29, 2009
1648	#09-27	"The Moon Pays A Visit To The Seven Sisters, The God Of War, The Goddess Of Love And The Bull's Eye"	--	Jack Horkheimer	July 6, 2009
1649	#09-28	"My Favorite And Almost Everyone's Favorite Summer Constellation"	--	Jack Horkheimer	July 13, 2009
1650	#09-29	"The Pussy Cat And The Scorpion: A Strange Tale Of A Tail"	--	Jack Horkheimer	July 20, 2009
1651	#09-30	"How To Find Two Wonders Of Summer Skies: The Heart Of The Scorpion And The Heart Of The Galaxy"	--	Jack Horkheimer	July 27, 2009
1652	#09-31	"Jupiter At Its Biggest, Brightest And Closest To Earth Since The Beginning Of The 21st Century"	--	Jack Horkheimer	August 3, 2009
1653	#09-32	"The Two False Comets Of Scorpius And How To Find Them"	--	Jack Horkheimer	August 10, 2009
1654	#09-33	"The Planet King Dazzles And How To Use The Moon To Find One Of The Largest Visible Stars"	--	Jack Horkheimer	August 17, 2009
1655	#09-34	"How To Find Mars During This Week's Annual Celebration Of The Great Mars Myth And Misunderstanding"	--	Jack Horkheimer	August 24, 2009
1656	#09-35	"Celebrate Labor Day The Cosmic Way With A Giant Triangle Of Stars Overhead"	--	Jack Horkheimer	August 31, 2009
1657	#09-36	"The Moon Visits Two Planets And Venus Almost Slams Into Leo The Lion"	--	Jack Horkheimer	September 7, 2009
1658	#09-37	"Find The False Dawn Of Omar Khayyam The Last Two Weeks Of This September"	--	Jack Horkheimer	September 14, 2009
1659	#09-38	"The Mystery Of The Wandering Stars"	--	Jack Horkheimer	September 21, 2009
1660	#09-39	"Two Weird Ways To Have Fun With The Harvest Moon Illusion"	--	Jack Horkheimer	September 28, 2009
1661	#09-40	"Mars And The Gemini Twins Line Up In A Row, Venus and Saturn Pair Up Super Close, And An Exquisite Moon Watches It All"	--	Jack Horkheimer	October 5, 2009
1662	#09-41	"Autumn's Flying Horse Of The Heavens And An Ancient Portal To Paradise"	--	Jack Horkheimer	October 12, 2009
1663	#09-42	"Mars And The Manger Plus The God Of War Steps Into A Cosmic Beehive Just As You Set Your Clocks Back To Standard Time"	--	Jack Horkheimer	October 19, 2009
1664	#09-43	"Our Annual Seven Sinister Sisters Halloween Show"	--	Jack Horkheimer	October 26, 2009
1665	#09-44	"The Lost Rings Of Saturn Return, An Aging Moon Visits Two Planets And Virgo's Brightest Star"	--	Jack Horkheimer	November 2, 2009
1666	#09-45	"Predictions Are For A Really Good Leonid Meteor Shower Next Week!"	--	Jack Horkheimer	November 9, 2009
1667	#09-46	"The Queen Of November Nights Rides High On Thanksgiving"	--	Jack Horkheimer	November 16, 2009
1668	#09-47	"Thanksgiving Week's Stars And Start Your Mars Watch Now"	--	Jack Horkheimer	November 23, 2009
1669	#09-48	"Dates To Remember In December: Several Cosmic Goodies Await Your Viewing Pleasure"	--	Jack Horkheimer	November 30, 2009
1670	#09-49	"Don't Miss The Best Meteor Shower Of The Year Next Week! And How To Find Neptune Using Jupiter"	--	Jack Horkheimer	December 7, 2009
1671	#09-50	"Next Monday Dec. 21st Is The Day Of The Winter Solstice... But What's It All About Anyway?"	--	Jack Horkheimer	December 14, 2009
1672	#09-51	"Howl In The Blue Full Moon This New Year's Eve! And You May Win A Telescope!"	--	Jack Horkheimer	December 21, 2009
1673	#09-52	"Mars Races Toward Earth For A Close Meeting And A "New Year's Eve Blue Moon Howl-In Reminder"	--	Jack Horkheimer	December 28, 2009
