= Jack Horkheimer: Star Gazer (1998 season) =

- No. of episodes: 52

Release
- Original network: PBS
- Original release: January 5 – December 28, 1998

Season chronology
- ← Previous (1997 season) Next → (1999 season)

The 1998 season of the astronomy TV show Jack Horkheimer: Star Gazer starring Jack Horkheimer started on January 5, 1998. The show's episode numbering scheme changed several times during its run to coincide with major events in the show's history. The official Star Gazer website hosts the complete scripts for each of the shows.

== 1998 season ==
| No. overall | No. in season | Title | Directed by | Written by | Original release date |
|---|---|---|---|---|---|
| 1048 | #SG 009-I | "The Crazy Carousel Ride of the Charbroiled Planet" | -- | Jack Horkheimer | January 5, 1998 |
| 1049 | #SG 010-I | "The Biggest Grand Scootchie of the Planets of '98" | -- | Jack Horkheimer | January 12, 1998 |
| 1050 | #SG 011-I | "Don't Look now but there's A UFO in Your Morning Coffee" | -- | Jack Horkheimer | January 19, 1998 |
| 1051 | #SG 012-I | "How to Find Saturn and The Winter Triangle" | -- | Jack Horkheimer | January 26, 1998 |
| 1052 | #SG 013-I | "A Great Big Red Star for Valentine's Day: About As Great and as Big as It Gets" | -- | Jack Horkheimer | February 2, 1998 |
| 1053 | #SG 014-I | "Sixteen Hundred Light Years Beyond: A Journey to A Birthplace of Stars" | -- | Jack Horkheimer | February 9, 1998 |
| 1054 | #SG 015-I | "A Venus/Moon Goodie and A Preview of Coming Summer Attractions" | -- | Jack Horkheimer | February 16, 1998 |
| 1055 | #SG 016-I | "The Moon and Saturn and The New Year's Star Two Months Later" | -- | Jack Horkheimer | February 23, 1998 |
| 1056 | #SG 017-I | "In Like A Lion, Out Like A Lamb and How to Find Them in March's Skies" | -- | Jack Horkheimer | March 2, 1998 |
| 1057 | #SG 018-I | "Mercury At Its Best For '98, Its Slow Dance With Saturn and Mars, Plus A Venus / Mars Super Shot" | -- | Jack Horkheimer | March 9, 1998 |
| 1058 | #SG 019-I | "Friends, Romans Countrymen, Lend Me Your 'Year'...New Year That Is" | -- | Jack Horkheimer | March 16, 1998 |
| 1059 | #SG 020-I | "The Strange Case Of The Brightest Star We See Most Often" | -- | Jack Horkheimer | March 23, 1998 |
| 1060 | #SG 021-I | "Prepare For The Most Spectacular Celestial Gathering of the Year" | -- | Jack Horkheimer | March 30, 1998 |
| 1061 | #SG 022-I | "The Smallest Full Moon of the Year, And the Horse on the Handle of the Big Dipper" | -- | Jack Horkheimer | April 6, 1998 |
| 1062 | #SG 023-I | "Next Week Is the Week for The Most Spectacular Celestial Gathering of the Year" | -- | Jack Horkheimer | April 13, 1998 |
| 1063 | #SG 024-I | "Don't Forget This Week's Most Spectacular Celestial Gathering of the Year! And An Exquisite Moon Bids Farewell to Winter Stars" | -- | Jack Horkheimer | April 20, 1998 |
| 1064 | #SG 025-I | "How to Time Travel Through the Big Dipper" | -- | Jack Horkheimer | April 27, 1998 |
| 1065 | #SG 026-I | "The Day the Sun Stands Still and A Close but Difficult Morning Meeting" | -- | Jack Horkheimer | May 4, 1998 |
| 1066 | #SG 027-I | "How To Use Our Moon To Find the Planets!" | -- | Jack Horkheimer | May 11, 1998 |
| 1067 | #SG 028-I | "A Grand Meeting Between the "Biggest" and Brightest Planets" | -- | Jack Horkheimer | May 18, 1998 |
| 1068 | #SG 029-I | "The Heart and Tale of the King of the Beasts" | -- | Jack Horkheimer | May 25, 1998 |
| 1069 | #SG 030-I | "Story Telling and The Stars: An Ancient Tale of Star-Crossed Lovers" | -- | Jack Horkheimer | June 1, 1998 |
| 1070 | #SG 031-I | "A Celestial Sky Show To Celebrate the Solstice" | -- | Jack Horkheimer | June 8, 1998 |
| 1071 | #SG 032-I | "Celebrate The Summer Solstice and Win A Copy Of Our Brand New "Star Gazer" Video" | -- | Jack Horkheimer | June 15, 1998 |
| 1072 | #SG 033-I | "The Brightest Star of Summer and The Great World's Fair Fiasco" | -- | Jack Horkheimer | June 22, 1998 |
| 1073 | #SG 034-I | "Mercury's One Week Stand and Far Out Earth" | -- | Jack Horkheimer | June 29, 1998 |
| 1074 | #SG 035-I | "How to Find the Planets of Summer '98" | -- | Jack Horkheimer | July 6, 1998 |
| 1075 | #SG 036-I | "This Week's Saturn/Moon Rise Next Week's Venus/Moon Pairing and Summer Midnight Magic" | -- | Jack Horkheimer | July 13, 1998 |
| 1076 | #SG 037-I | "A Wonderfully Weird Summer Night Wonder and How To Find It Easy As Pie" | -- | Jack Horkheimer | July 20, 1998 |
| 1077 | #SG 038-I | "Mars and Venus Pay A Visit as the Gemini Twins Look On" | -- | Jack Horkheimer | July 27, 1998 |
| 1078 | #SG 039-I | "Week of Togetherness for Mars and Venus and The Perseid Meteor Shower" | -- | Jack Horkheimer | August 3, 1998 |
| 1079 | #SG 040-I | "A Wonder of the Universe: Where an Ancient Archer Aims His Arrow" | -- | Jack Horkheimer | August 10, 1998 |
| 1080 | #SG 041-I | "Nights of the Nihplod and The Summer Triangle" | -- | Jack Horkheimer | August 17, 1998 |
| 1081 | #SG 042-I | "The False Dawn of Omar Khayyam and How to Find It" | -- | Jack Horkheimer | August 24, 1998 |
| 1082 | #SG 043-I | "Jupiter / Moon Weekend and An Early Bird Planet Shuffle" | -- | Jack Horkheimer | August 31, 1998 |
| 1083 | #SG 044-I | "This Week's Close Meeting of Two Planets and Jupiter at Its Biggest, Brightest and Closest Since 1987" | -- | Jack Horkheimer | September 7, 1998 |
| 1084 | #SG 045-I | "The Autumnal Equinox: A Week of Due East Sunrises and Due West Sunsets" | -- | Jack Horkheimer | September 14, 1998 |
| 1085 | #SG 046-I | "A New Way to Look at the Wonderful Summer/Early Autumn Triangle" | -- | Jack Horkheimer | September 21, 1998 |
| 1086 | #SG 047-I | "Celestial Goodies for This October!" | -- | Jack Horkheimer | September 28, 1998 |
| 1087 | #SG 048-I | "Mars and Regulus: The Meeting and Parting of A Planet and A Star" | -- | Jack Horkheimer | October 5, 1998 |
| 1088 | #SG 049-I | "Saturn: At Its Closest in 20 Years!" | -- | Jack Horkheimer | October 12, 1998 |
| 1089 | #SG 050-I | "No Tricks But Some Real Cosmic Treats This Hallowe'en Of '98" | -- | Jack Horkheimer | October 19, 1998 |
| 1090 | #SG 051-I | "The Closest, Biggest and Brightest Full Moon of the Year!" | -- | Jack Horkheimer | October 26, 1998 |
| 1091 | #SG 052-I | "The Bragging Stars of an Ancient Queen in November's Milky Way" | -- | Jack Horkheimer | November 2, 1998 |
| 1092 | #SG 053-I | "Will Leo The Lion And His Leonids Roar Next Week? Getting Ready for A Possible Meteor Storm!" | -- | Jack Horkheimer | November 9, 1998 |
| 1093 | #SG 054-I | "Moon, Planet and Star Magic for the Thanksgiving Weekend" | -- | Jack Horkheimer | November 16, 1998 |
| 1094 | #SG 055-I | "A No Bull About It Star and A Thanksgiving Week Reminder" | -- | Jack Horkheimer | November 23, 1998 |
| 1095 | #SG 056-I | "The Flying Horse of the Heavens and The Gateway to Paradise" | -- | Jack Horkheimer | November 30, 1998 |
| 1096 | #SG 057-I | "A Pink Planet and A Red Star for the Holidays" | -- | Jack Horkheimer | December 7, 1998 |
| 1097 | #SG 058-I | "The Return of the Christmas 'Star' and A Christmas Eve/Christmas Day Sky Duo" | -- | Jack Horkheimer | December 14, 1998 |
| 1098 | #SG 059-I | "A Sky Full of Planets For Christmas!" | -- | Jack Horkheimer | December 21, 1998 |
| 1099 | #SG 060-I | "The New Year's Eve Star: A New Way to Ring in the New Year!" | -- | Jack Horkheimer | December 28, 1998 |
