= Jack Horkheimer: Star Gazer (2000 season) =

- No. of episodes: 52

Release
- Original network: PBS
- Original release: January 3 – December 25, 2000

Season chronology
- ← Previous (1999 season) Next → (2001 season)

The 2000 season of the astronomy TV show Jack Horkheimer: Star Gazer starring Jack Horkheimer started on January 3, 2000. The episode numbering scheme for the show changed yet again in this season. This time the "SG" was dropped from the episode number. This had been used in the previous three seasons to differentiate the Star Gazer shows from the Star Hustler shows. The official Star Gazer website hosts the complete scripts for each of the shows.

== 2000 season ==
No. overall	No. in season	Title	Directed by	Written by	Original release date
1152	#00-01	"Earth Closest to the Sun This Week! Four Naked Eye Planets and A Lunar Eclipse Alert!"	--	Jack Horkheimer	January 3, 2000
1153	#00-02	"Get Ready for Next Week's Total Eclipse of the Moon"	--	Jack Horkheimer	January 10, 2000
1154	#00-03	"A Lunar Eclipse Alert! And A Journey to A Place Where Stars Are Born"	--	Jack Horkheimer	January 17, 2000
1155	#00-04	"A Ground Hog Day Sky Show Extravaganza! Plus A Tiny Taste of Summer"	--	Jack Horkheimer	January 24, 2000
1156	#00-05	"The Moon Visits the Planets and The Planets Prepare To Visit Each Other"	--	Jack Horkheimer	January 31, 2000
1157	#00-06	"A Great Big Red Star for Valentine's Day, Slowly Beating like A Giant Cosmic Heart"	--	Jack Horkheimer	February 7, 2000
1158	#00-07	"The Brightest Star in the Night Sky"	--	Jack Horkheimer	February 14, 2000
1159	#00-08	"The Venus Challenge"	--	Jack Horkheimer	February 21, 2000
1160	#00-09	"Getting Ready for A Great Meeting of the Planets"	--	Jack Horkheimer	February 28, 2000
1161	#00-10	"The Strange and Marvelous Reality of The Brightest Star We See Most Often"	--	Jack Horkheimer	March 6, 2000
1162	#00-11	"Why Is Spring Called Spring? And Other Tantalizing Tidbits about the Seasons"	--	Jack Horkheimer	March 13, 2000
1163	#00-12	"Low Lyin' Orion and The High Flyin' Lion"	--	Jack Horkheimer	March 20, 2000
1164	#00-13	"The Incredible Journey of Mars, Jupiter and Saturn"	--	Jack Horkheimer	March 27, 2000
1165	#00-14	"The Great Mars/Jupiter/Saturn Sky Show Reaches Its Climax"	--	Jack Horkheimer	April 3, 2000
1166	#00-15	"Using the Big Dipper To Find Two Wonderful Stars!"	--	Jack Horkheimer	April 10, 2000
1167	#00-16	"How to Time Travel through the Big Dipper"	--	Jack Horkheimer	April 17, 2000
1168	#00-17	"The Big Planetary Lineup Brou-Ha-Ha! You Won't Even Get Your Feet Wet!"	--	Jack Horkheimer	April 24, 2000
1169	#00-18	"How to Use the Moon to Find the Lion, The Virgin and The Scorpion"	--	Jack Horkheimer	May 1, 2000
1170	#00-19	"How To Measure Distances In the Sky Using Just Your Fingers and The Big Dipper"	--	Jack Horkheimer	May 8, 2000
1171	#00-20	"Regulus and Denebola, The Heart and Tail Of Leo The Lion"	--	Jack Horkheimer	May 15, 2000
1172	#00-21	"There Are Only 2 Really Good Times This Year To See Mercury and Next Week Is One Of Them!"	--	Jack Horkheimer	May 22, 2000
1173	#00-22	"The Closest Meeting Of the Two Largest Planets for 20 Years!"	--	Jack Horkheimer	May 29, 2000
1174	#00-23	"A Jupiter-Saturn Alert & The Wonderful Full Moon of June"	--	Jack Horkheimer	June 5, 2000
1175	#00-24	"Day Star Day: A Celebration of the Summer Solstice and The Star We Call Our Sun"	--	Jack Horkheimer	June 12, 2000
1176	#00-25	"A Great Celestial Triangle Announces the Beginning of Summer and Your Last Chance To See Jupiter and Saturn This Close Until 2020"	--	Jack Horkheimer	June 19, 2000
1177	#00-26	"A Special Sky For The 4th Of July"	--	Jack Horkheimer	June 26, 2000
1178	#00-27	"Earth Farthest From the Sun This Week, and The Two Largest Planets Light up Morning Skies"	--	Jack Horkheimer	July 3, 2000
1179	#00-28	"It's Zubenelgenubi and Zubeneschamali Time Once Again!"	--	Jack Horkheimer	July 10, 2000
1180	#00-29	"A Pre Dawn Sky For the Last Week of July!"	--	Jack Horkheimer	July 17, 2000
1181	#00-30	"Two Cat's Eyes in Summer Skies"	--	Jack Horkheimer	July 24, 2000
1182	#00-31	"A Planet Named George and How to Find It Next Week... Maybe"	--	Jack Horkheimer	July 31, 2000
1183	#00-32	"The One Hour Only Perseid Comet Litter Meteor Shower"	--	Jack Horkheimer	August 7, 2000
1184	#00-33	"Using the Moon to Find Four Planets in Late Summer Skies"	--	Jack Horkheimer	August 14, 2000
1185	#00-34	"A City Of Stars in Summer Skies"	--	Jack Horkheimer	August 21, 2000
1186	#00-35	"Vega: The Brightest and Most Wonderful Star of the Summer Triangle"	--	Jack Horkheimer	August 28, 2000
1187	#00-36	"The Nights of the Harvest Moon and Mars and Regulus Meet"	--	Jack Horkheimer	September 4, 2000
1188	#00-37	"This Year's Autumnal Equinox and The Unusual Effect It Will Have on Drivers"	--	Jack Horkheimer	September 11, 2000
1189	#00-38	"Moon and Planet Games for the Last Week of September"	--	Jack Horkheimer	September 18, 2000
1190	#00-39	"Vega: The Brightest & Most Wonderful Star of the Summer Triangle"	--	Jack Horkheimer	September 25, 2000
1191	#00-40	"The Milky Way At Its Very Best In Early Evening October Skies"	--	Jack Horkheimer	October 2, 2000
1192	#00-41	"The Planets Brighten and Triskaidekaphobia Day!"	--	Jack Horkheimer	October 9, 2000
1193	#00-42	"The Witching Hour and The Pleiades Hour and The End of the World on Halloween!"	--	Jack Horkheimer	October 16, 2000
1194	#00-43	"A Venus and Crescent Moon Sky Goody and Say Farewell to Sagittarius"	--	Jack Horkheimer	October 23, 2000
1195	#00-44	"The Farthest Thing in the Universe You Can See With the Naked Eye"	--	Jack Horkheimer	October 30, 2000
1196	#00-45	"The Leonid Meteor Shower and The Full Moon Visits Two Planets and A Star"	--	Jack Horkheimer	November 6, 2000
1197	#00-46	"A Turkey Isn't the Only Bird you'll see For Thanksgiving"	--	Jack Horkheimer	November 13, 2000
1198	#00-47	"Three Outrageously Wonderful Planets For The Holiday Season, 2000"	--	Jack Horkheimer	November 20, 2000
1199	#00-48	"The Surest Sign of Winter and Why The Shortest Day Of The Year Doesn't Feel Like The Shortest Day Of The Year"	--	Jack Horkheimer	November 27, 2000
1200	#00-49	"The Holiday Star Gets Higher and Brighter! And using The Moon to find The 2 Largest Planets"	--	Jack Horkheimer	December 4, 2000
1201	#00-50	"The Eclipse of the Sun on Christmas Day and How to View It Safely"	--	Jack Horkheimer	December 11, 2000
1202	#00-51	"Now 's The Time To Use Your New Telescope and Binoculars Because 3 Outrageously Wonderful Planets Bring The Year 2000 To A Spectacular Sky Show End"	--	Jack Horkheimer	December 18, 2000
1203	#00-52	"Ring In the New Year the Cosmic Way! With The New Year's Eve Star and Two Wonderful Planets"	--	Jack Horkheimer	December 25, 2000
