= Jack Horkheimer: Star Gazer (1999 season) =

- No. of episodes: 52

Release
- Original network: PBS
- Original release: January 4 – December 27, 1999

Season chronology
- ← Previous (1998 season) Next → (2000 season)

The 1999 season of the astronomy TV show Jack Horkheimer: Star Gazer starring Jack Horkheimer started on January 4, 1999. The episode numbering scheme for the show changed again in this season. Episode numbering was restarted and incorporated the last two digits of the year, in this case "99" for the year 1999. The official Star Gazer website hosts the complete scripts for each of the shows.

== 1999 season ==
No. overall	No. in season	Title	Directed by	Written by	Original release date
1100	#SG 99-01	"The Evening Star and the Seventh Planet and Earth Closest To The Sun This Week!"	--	Jack Horkheimer	January 4, 1999
1101	#SG 99-02	"Hail Caesar and Happy New Year! And Getting Ready for A Super-Duper Grand Conjunction of the Two Brightest Planets!"	--	Jack Horkheimer	January 11, 1999
1102	#SG 99-03	"The Orion Nebula: A True Winter Wonder!"	--	Jack Horkheimer	January 18, 1999
1103	#SG 99-04	"Two Blue Moons For 1999! And The Big Blue Moon Brouhaha"	--	Jack Horkheimer	January 25, 1999
1104	#SG 99-05	"A Great Big Red Star for Valentine's Day: About As Big and as Red as It Gets!"	--	Jack Horkheimer	February 1, 1999
1105	#SG 99-06	"A Cosmic Switcheroo! The 8th & 9th Planets Change Places This Week! And Getting Ready for February 23rd's Super Duper Conjunction!"	--	Jack Horkheimer	February 8, 1999
1106	#SG 99-07	"How To Watch Next Week's Spectacular Super-Duper Meeting of the Planets"	--	Jack Horkheimer	February 15, 1999
1107	#SG 99-08	"The Elusive First Planet and How to Find It Easy as Pie"	--	Jack Horkheimer	February 22, 1999
1108	#SG 99-09	"Four Planets In A Bundle For Your Early Evening Viewing Pleasure"	--	Jack Horkheimer	March 1, 1999
1109	#SG 99-10	"An Exquisite Celestial Trio with Exotic Earthshine, Friday March 19th"	--	Jack Horkheimer	March 8, 1999
1110	#SG 99-11	"Spring Is Here! At Least According To the Yellow Line In The Middle Of the Road"	--	Jack Horkheimer	March 15, 1999
1111	#SG 99-12	"The Beginning of Spring and The End of Winter Reflected in the Stars and A Blue Moon Update"	--	Jack Horkheimer	March 22, 1999
1112	#SG 99-13	"April 1999: The Month of Mars"	--	Jack Horkheimer	March 29, 1999
1113	#SG 99-14	"A New Way to Use the Big Dipper and Venus Pays A Visit to the Seven Sisters"	--	Jack Horkheimer	April 5, 1999
1114	#SG 99-15	"The Weekend of Nine Cosmic Ladies and The Great Red Star"	--	Jack Horkheimer	April 12, 1999
1115	#SG 99-16	"Mars At Opposition This Week! Closest and Brightest Since 1990!"	--	Jack Horkheimer	April 19, 1999
1116	#SG 99-17	"The Truth about the North Star and How to Find It"	--	Jack Horkheimer	April 26, 1999
1117	#SG 99-18	"A Super Close Up Look at Mars Which Is Still At Its Brightest Since 1990!"	--	Jack Horkheimer	May 3, 1999
1118	#SG 99-19	"Venus, Earth's Twin Sister, Takes Over Evening Skies"	--	Jack Horkheimer	May 10, 1999
1119	#SG 99-20	"How to Find Virgo and Its Brightest Star Spica"	--	Jack Horkheimer	May 17, 1999
1120	#SG 99-21	"The Gemini Twins and the Goddess of Love and The Smallest Full Moon of the Year"	--	Jack Horkheimer	May 24, 1999
1121	#SG 99-22	"Awesome Arcturus: Find It Now Before it's Gone"	--	Jack Horkheimer	May 31, 1999
1122	#SG 99-23	"Mars and Spica Closest This Week, Mercury Puts In An Appearance, and A Venus / Moon Super Goody!"	--	Jack Horkheimer	June 7, 1999
1123	#SG 99-24	"What the Night Sky Looks Like On the First Night of Summer"	--	Jack Horkheimer	June 14, 1999
1124	#SG 99-25	"The Most Difficult to Find of All the Naked Eye Planets and How to Find It!"	--	Jack Horkheimer	June 21, 1999
1125	#SG 99-26	"What to See in the Sky on The 4th Of July!"	--	Jack Horkheimer	June 28, 1999
1126	#SG 99-27	"Don't Miss July 15th's Super Duper Spectacular Cosmic Trio! A Real Knock Your Socks off Sky Show!"	--	Jack Horkheimer	July 5, 1999
1127	#SG 99-28	"How to Watch Two Bright Planets and Two Bright Stars as They Move Away From Each Other"	--	Jack Horkheimer	July 12, 1999
1128	#SG 99-29	"The Scorpion and The Pussycat and How To Find Them!"	--	Jack Horkheimer	July 19, 1999
1129	#SG 99-30	"A Moon Journey Past Cosmic Wonders In Early Morning Skies"	--	Jack Horkheimer	July 26, 1999
1130	#SG 99-31	"Don't Miss Next Week's Perseid Meteor Shower Because This Year, Conditions Are Ideal For It!"	--	Jack Horkheimer	August 2, 1999
1131	#SG 99-32	"Mercury and The Gemini Twins and The Heliacal Rising Of the Dog Star!"	--	Jack Horkheimer	August 9, 1999
1132	#SG 99-33	"How To Use Mars To Find The Two Most Tongue Twisting Stars In The Cosmos!"	--	Jack Horkheimer	August 16, 1999
1133	#SG 99-34	"The Two Marvelous Star Clusters That Ride above the Scorpion's Tail!"	--	Jack Horkheimer	August 23, 1999
1134	#SG 99-35	"How to find The 'False Dawn' Of an Ancient Persian Poet"	--	Jack Horkheimer	August 30, 1999
1135	#SG 99-36	"Mars Meets Its Rival! And Won't Be This Close Again Until 2016!"	--	Jack Horkheimer	September 6, 1999
1136	#SG 99-37	"The Two Days of the Year When the Sun Rises Due East and Sets Due Due West"	--	Jack Horkheimer	September 13, 1999
1137	#SG 99-38	"A Trick You Can Do With A Dime and The Harvest Moon"	--	Jack Horkheimer	September 20, 1999
1138	#SG 99-39	"A Parade of Planets from Sunset to Sunrise"	--	Jack Horkheimer	September 27, 1999
1139	#SG 99-40	"The Moon and Venus, The Moon and Mercury and The Moon and Mars!"	--	Jack Horkheimer	October 4, 1999
1140	#SG 99-41	"Stars For an Indian Summer!"	--	Jack Horkheimer	October 11, 1999
1141	#SG 99-42	"Jupiter at Its Brightest and Closest in A Dozen Years!"	--	Jack Horkheimer	October 18, 1999
1142	#SG 99-43	"Venus at Its Highest and Brightest for the Year!"	--	Jack Horkheimer	October 25, 1999
1143	#SG 99-44	"Saturn at Opposition This Week and As Big and as Bright as It Ever Gets!"	--	Jack Horkheimer	November 1, 1999
1144	#SG 99-45	"Will Next Week's Leonid Meteor Shower Turn into A Meteor Storm?!"	--	Jack Horkheimer	November 8, 1999
1145	#SG 99-46	"A Meteor Storm Alert! And Our Moon Pays A Visit to the Two Largest Planets"	--	Jack Horkheimer	November 15, 1999
1146	#SG 99-47	"Another Cosmic Triangle and The Time Machine Effect!"	--	Jack Horkheimer	November 22, 1999
1147	#SG 99-48	"The Moon Meets the Pink Iron Planet"	--	Jack Horkheimer	November 29, 1999
1148	#SG 99-49	"The Geminid Meteor Shower, Plus the Moon and Mars and A Planet Named George!"	--	Jack Horkheimer	December 6, 1999
1149	#SG 99-50	"The Astonishing Lunar Illumination of December 22nd, 1999! The Brightest First Night of Winter In 133 years!"	--	Jack Horkheimer	December 13, 1999
1150	#SG 99-51	"The Winter Solstice and Why The Shortest Day of The Year Doesn't Feel Like The Shortest"	--	Jack Horkheimer	December 20, 1999
1151	#SG 99-52	"A Star for the Millennium! A Cosmic Way to Ring in the New Year!"	--	Jack Horkheimer	December 27, 1999
