= Jack Horkheimer: Star Gazer (2010 season) =

- No. of episodes: 52

Release
- Original network: PBS
- Original release: January 4 – December 27, 2010

Season chronology
- ← Previous (2009 season) Next → (2011 season)

The 2010 season of the astronomy TV show Jack Horkheimer: Star Gazer starring Jack Horkheimer started on January 4, 2010. As a consequence of Jack Horkheimer's death on August 20, 2010, the episodes which were recorded for the last four months of 2010 were hosted by guest hosts. The episodes for the month of September 2010 were the last to be based on scripts written by Jack Horkheimer. The show's episode numbering scheme changed several times during its run to coincide with major events in the show's history. The official Star Gazer website hosts the complete scripts for each of the shows.

== 2010 season ==
No. overall	No. in season	Title	Directed by	Written by	Original release date
1674	#10-01	"Super Cosmic Fun: How To Play The Mars/Sirius Game"	--	Jack Horkheimer	January 4, 2010
1675	#10-02	"The King Of The Planets And Our Nearest Neighbor Make A Dynamic Duo And Another 'Get Ready For Mars' Reminder!"	--	Jack Horkheimer	January 11, 2010
1676	#10-03	"How To See One Of The Most Awesome Wonders Of The Universe With The Naked Eye"	--	Jack Horkheimer	January 18, 2010
1677	#10-04	"Mars At Its Closest, Biggest And Brightest For The Year Plus The Closest, Biggest And Brightest Full Moon Of The Year!"	--	Jack Horkheimer	January 25, 2010
1678	#10-05	"Three Of My Favorite Stars Which May Become Your Three Favorite Stars"	--	Jack Horkheimer	February 1, 2010
1679	#10-06	"Two Bright Red Cosmic Lights For Your Valentine This Valentine's Day Night, Sunday February 14th, 2010"	--	Jack Horkheimer	February 8, 2010
1680	#10-07	"Orion The Hunter's Two Wonderful Dogs, Canis Major And Canis Minor"	--	Jack Horkheimer	February 15, 2010
1681	#10-08	"How To Find The Gemini Twins And Their Sensational Siblings"	--	Jack Horkheimer	February 22, 2010
1682	#10-09	"Fun Facts And Things To Do On The First Day Of Spring"	--	Jack Horkheimer	March 1, 2010
1683	#10-10	"The Moon Visits The Seven Sisters On The First Night Of Spring: A Super Sight In Your Binoculars"	--	Jack Horkheimer	March 8, 2010
1684	#10-11	"Saturn At Its Closest, Biggest And Brightest For The Year And Mars Still Brighter Than Every Visible Star Except One"	--	Jack Horkheimer	March 15, 2010
1685	#10-12	"Leo The Lion Chases Orion / A Sure Sign Spring Is Here"	--	Jack Horkheimer	March 22, 2010
1686	#10-13	"Planets #1 And #2 Pair Up In A Super Close Meeting This Weekend"	--	Jack Horkheimer	March 29, 2010
1687	#10-14	"Cosmic Night Of The IRS: A Crescent Moon Visits Mercury! Plus Venus Begins A Trip To The Seven Sisters"	--	Jack Horkheimer	April 5, 2010
1688	#10-15	"Celebrate National Astronomy Day And If You Do It Right You'll See Several Planets And The Moon Close Up For Free!"	--	Jack Horkheimer	April 12, 2010
1689	#10-16	"April Showers Bring May Flowers: An Easy Way To Find Two Cosmic Blooms Of Spring"	--	Jack Horkheimer	April 19, 2010
1690	#10-17	"What You Know And What You Don't Know About The Most Famous Star In The Sky"	--	Jack Horkheimer	April 26, 2010
1691	#10-18	"The Moon Pays A Visit To The Two Brightest Planets And Start Your Mars Race To Regulus Watch Now"	--	Jack Horkheimer	May 3, 2010
1692	#10-19	"Test Your Eyesight The Cosmic Way. Can You See The Horse And Its Rider?"	--	Jack Horkheimer	May 10, 2010
1693	#10-20	"See The Lord Of The Rings Almost Ringless Then Watch His Rings Grow"	--	Jack Horkheimer	May 17, 2010
1694	#10-21	"Awesome Arcturus: The Now You See It, Now You Don't, Star"	--	Jack Horkheimer	May 24, 2010
1695	#10-22	"An Impressive Meeting Of Planets And Stars During The First Two Weeks Of June"	--	Jack Horkheimer	May 31, 2010
1696	#10-23	"Venus And The Moon Make A Lovely Duo And How To Find Three Planets Lined Up In A Row"	--	Jack Horkheimer	June 7, 2010
1697	#10-24	"Join Us In Our Annual Day Star Day Celebration On This Summer Solstice Weekend 2010!"	--	Jack Horkheimer	June 14, 2010
1698	#10-25	"The Stars Of Early Summer Nights Welcome In The New Season And Say Farewell To The Old"	--	Jack Horkheimer	June 21, 2010
1699	#10-26	"Earth At Aphelion And Start Your Three Planet And Great Star Watch On The 4th Of July!"	--	Jack Horkheimer	June 28, 2010
1700	#10-27	"Next Week You Can Use The Moon To Identify The Brightest Star Of Leo The Lion And Four Wonderful Planets"	--	Jack Horkheimer	July 5, 2010
1701	#10-28	"My Favorite And Almost Everyone's Favorite Constellation"	--	Jack Horkheimer	July 12, 2010
1702	#10-29	"The Pussy Cat And The Scorpion: A Strange Tale Of A Tail"	--	Jack Horkheimer	July 19, 2010
1703	#10-30	"The Incredible Planet Threesome Of August 2010"	--	Jack Horkheimer	July 26, 2010
1704	#10-31	"How To Find Two Wonders Of Summer's Skies: The Heart Of the Scorpion And The Heart Of The Galaxy"	--	Jack Horkheimer	August 2, 2010
1705	#10-32	"The Two False Comets Of Scorpius And How To Find Them"	--	Jack Horkheimer	August 9, 2010
1706	#10-33	"The Mystery Of The Wandering Stars"	--	Jack Horkheimer	August 16, 2010
1707	#10-34	"Find The False Dawn Of Omar Khayyam"	--	Jack Horkheimer	August 23, 2010
1708	#10-35	"Celebrate Labor Day The Cosmic Way With A Giant Triangle Of Stars Overhead"	--	Jack Horkheimer	August 30, 2010
1709	#10-36	"Mercury In The Morning And Jupiter At Night"	--	Jack Horkheimer	September 6, 2010
1710	#10-37	"The Harvestest Of Harvest Moons"	--	Jack Horkheimer	September 13, 2010
1711	#10-38	"The Super Bright Star Which Shines On The Autumnal Equinox"	--	Jack Horkheimer	September 20, 2010
1712	#10-39	"Say Farewell To Summer's Cosmic Triangle And Welcome to Autumn's Cosmic Square"	--	Jack Horkheimer	September 27, 2010
1713	#10-40	"Stars For Indian Summer"	--	Bill Dishong	October 4, 2010
1714	#10-41	"The Hunter's Moon For 2010 And Use The Moon To Hunt For Jupiter"	--	Bill Dishong	October 11, 2010
1715	#10-42	"Our Annual Seven Sinister Sisters Halloween Show"	--	Bill Dishong	October 18, 2010
1716	#10-43	"The Morning Star Returns And The Moon Shows You Saturn"	--	Bill Dishong	October 25, 2010
1717	#10-44	"How To Look Back In Time 2 1/2 Million Years Or 36 Minutes"	--	Bill Dishong	November 1, 2010
1718	#10-45	"Get Ready For The Leonid Meteor Shower Next Week"	--	Bill Dishong	November 8, 2010
1719	#10-46	"Three Cosmic Birds Plus Planets And Stars To Help You Celebrate Thanksgiving"	--	Bill Dishong	November 15, 2010
1720	#10-47	"Let The Moon Show You Saturn, Spica And Venus Before Dawn"	--	Bill Dishong	November 22, 2010
1721	#10-48	"See A Double Cluster Of Stars Beloved By Ancient Chinese Astronomers Plus Venus Dazzles Before Dawn"	--	Bill Dishong	November 29, 2010
1722	#10-49	"Be Sure To Catch What Could Be The Best Meteor Shower Of The Year Next Week"	--	Bill Dishong	December 6, 2010
1723	#10-50	"Get Ready For Next Week's Total Eclipse Of the Moon, You Won't See Another One For Four Years"	--	Bill Dishong	December 13, 2010
1724	#10-51	"Follow The Moon Past Planets And Stars In The Morning Sky"	--	Bill Dishong	December 20, 2010
1725	#10-52	"Third Time Is The Charm For Jupiter And Uranus"	--	Bill Dishong	December 27, 2010
