= Jack Horkheimer: Star Gazer (2003 season) =

Season of television series

- No. of episodes: 52

Release
- Original network: PBS
- Original release: January 6 – December 29, 2003

Season chronology
- ← Previous (2002 season) Next → (2004 season)

The 2003 season of the astronomy TV show Jack Horkheimer: Star Gazer starring Jack Horkheimer started on January 6, 2003. The show's episode numbering scheme changed several times during its run to coincide with major events in the show's history. The official Star Gazer website hosts the complete scripts for each of the shows.

== 2003 season ==
No. overall	No. in season	Title	Directed by	Written by	Original release date
1309	#03-01	"The Moon Meets the 2 Biggest Planets at Their Best Among Winter's Brightest Stars"	--	Jack Horkheimer	January 6, 2003
1310	#03-02	"How to See Something 20,000 Times the Size of Our Solar System with Just the Naked Eye"	--	Jack Horkheimer	January 13, 2003
1311	#03-03	"The God Of War And His Rival Make An Exquisite Triangle With The Goddess of Love In Late January Mornings"	--	Jack Horkheimer	January 20, 2003
1312	#03-04	"Punxsutawney Phil and the King of the Planets, Candlemas and the First Cross Quarter Day Of 2003"	--	Jack Horkheimer	January 27, 2003
1313	#03-05	"Using the Moon to Find the Two Largest Planets"	--	Jack Horkheimer	February 3, 2003
1314	#03-06	"The Valentine's Day Star and A Sky Full Of Goodies For Valentine's Day Night"	--	Jack Horkheimer	February 10, 2003
1315	#03-07	"A Mars And Venus Update and How To Find Them Using The Moon Next Week"	--	Jack Horkheimer	February 17, 2003
1316	#03-08	"I Eat Green Caterpillars Whenever I Look At Jupiter"	--	Jack Horkheimer	February 24, 2003
1317	#03-09	"Taurus the Bull And His Wonderful Unusual Rider"	--	Jack Horkheimer	March 3, 2003
1318	#03-10	"Happy Vernal Equinox! Or Have You Ever Wondered Why We Call Spring, 'Spring'?"	--	Jack Horkheimer	March 10, 2003
1319	#03-11	"The Great Mars / Venus Switch!"	--	Jack Horkheimer	March 17, 2003
1320	#03-12	"Do You Know The Name Of the Brightest Star We See Most Often? Hint: It's Weird and Wonderful and Probably Not What You Think!"	--	Jack Horkheimer	March 24, 2003
1321	#03-13	"The Moon Visits Three Planets and A Cosmic Beehive of Stars"	--	Jack Horkheimer	March 31, 2003
1322	#03-14	"The Closest Biggest Brightest Full Moon Of 2003 And Mercury at Its Best for the Year on the Same Night"	--	Jack Horkheimer	April 7, 2003
1323	#03-15	"Five Fine Planets and A Star That Exploded In 1054 A.D!"	--	Jack Horkheimer	April 14, 2003
1324	#03-16	"Two Wonderful Stars of Spring: One Racing Toward Us and The Other Speeding Away!"	--	Jack Horkheimer	April 21, 2003
1325	#03-17	"The Dual Lunar Eclipses of 2003!"	--	Jack Horkheimer	April 28, 2003
1326	#03-18	"May 15th's Total Lunar Eclipse"	--	Jack Horkheimer	May 5, 2003
1327	#03-19	"Farewell to Orion and Saturn and Hello, Hello to Mars & The Moon"	--	Jack Horkheimer	May 12, 2003
1328	#03-20	"Leo the Lion: Spring's Awesome Sphinx of The Heavens And The Cosmic King Of The Beasts"	--	Jack Horkheimer	May 19, 2003
1329	#03-21	"The King of the Planets and The King of the Beasts! Meet the Queen of the Night Sky"	--	Jack Horkheimer	May 26, 2003
1330	#03-22	"The Inferior Planets Meet On The Summer Solstice, The First Day Of Summer"	--	Jack Horkheimer	June 2, 2003
1331	#03-23	"Mars Brightens 100% In June and A Great Triangle Announces the Beginning of Summer"	--	Jack Horkheimer	June 9, 2003
1332	#03-24	"Day Star Day: Our Annual Star Gazer Celebration Of Our Closest Star On The Summer Solstice"	--	Jack Horkheimer	June 16, 2003
1333	#03-25	"The Moon, The King and The Rival Of Mars And The Sun At Its Dimmest For 2003!"	--	Jack Horkheimer	June 23, 2003
1334	#03-26	"A Super Sky For The 4th Of July!"	--	Jack Horkheimer	June 30, 2003
1335	#03-27	"Mars Doubles Its Brightness This Month As It Races Towards Earth And Has A Spectacular Meeting With The Moon On The 17th"	--	Jack Horkheimer	July 7, 2003
1336	#03-28	"Jupiter And Mercury Meet And Change Places And Our Moon Pays A Visit To Saturn"	--	Jack Horkheimer	July 14, 2003
1337	#03-29	"Vega: The Arc Light Of Summer Nights And The Apex of the Sun's Way"	--	Jack Horkheimer	July 21, 2003
1338	#03-30	"Weird But Wonderful Altair: The Second Brightest Star Of The Summer Triangle"	--	Jack Horkheimer	July 28, 2003
1339	#03-31	"Use The Moon To Find Mars As Mars Races For Its Closest Meeting In Almost 60,000 Years Plus "Sorry About The Perseids""	--	Jack Horkheimer	August 4, 2003
1340	#03-32	"Mars Continues Racing Towards Us For Its August 27th Meeting And The Moon Meets The Ringed Planet"	--	Jack Horkheimer	August 11, 2003
1341	#03-33	"Only One Week To Go Until Mars Reaches Its Brightest Any Living Human Has Ever Seen It"	--	Jack Horkheimer	August 18, 2003
1342	#03-34	"Mars Closer To Earth This Week In Almost 60,000 Years! Only Neanderthal Man Has Ever Seen It This Bright!"	--	Jack Horkheimer	August 25, 2003
1343	#03-35	"Shine On, Shine On Harvest Moon... Up Over Mars!"	--	Jack Horkheimer	September 1, 2003
1344	#03-36	"A Rapid Sun On The First Days Of Fall And A Mars Reminder"	--	Jack Horkheimer	September 8, 2003
1345	#03-37	"Celebrate The 1st Day Of Fall With 3 Cosmic Goodies Lined Up In A Row And An Exquisite Crescent Moon!"	--	Jack Horkheimer	September 15, 2003
1346	#03-38	"How To Get A Planetarium In Your Own Home For Free!"	--	Jack Horkheimer	September 22, 2003
1347	#03-39	"Four Planets Visible And One About To Emerge Plus The Moon Rides Across The Sky With Mars Again"	--	Jack Horkheimer	September 29, 2003
1348	#03-40	"The Moon Pays A Visit To Saturn, Winter's Stars Make A Midnight Preview And Mars Is Still Fabulous But Not For Long"	--	Jack Horkheimer	October 6, 2003
1349	#03-41	"Why Do The Stars Change With The Seasons? And 2 Cosmic Signs That Fall Is Here"	--	Jack Horkheimer	October 13, 2003
1350	#03-42	"Celebrate Halloween The Cosmic Way Plus Some Of Halloween's Most Famous Myths And Conceptions"	--	Jack Horkheimer	October 20, 2003
1351	#03-43	"Next Week's Eclipse Of The Frosty Beaver Moon: The Last Of The Two Total Lunar Eclipses Of 2003"	--	Jack Horkheimer	October 27, 2003
1352	#03-44	"Saturn Prepares For Its Best Viewing Until 2030 On New Years Eve"	--	Jack Horkheimer	November 3, 2003
1353	#03-45	"Leo The Lion Plays Host To The Moon And Jupiter On The Night of The Leonid Meteor Shower"	--	Jack Horkheimer	November 10, 2003
1354	#03-46	"Earth's Odd Twin Sister Planet Snuggles Up to The Moon During Thanksgiving Week And Prepares For A Close Meeting"	--	Jack Horkheimer	November 17, 2003
1355	#03-47	"Our Moon Visits Mars, Venus And Mercury Pair Up Just After Sunset And Saturn Gets Ready For New Year's Eve"	--	Jack Horkheimer	November 24, 2003
1356	#03-48	"A Brilliant Evening Star For The Holidays! And Catch Mercury Now"	--	Jack Horkheimer	December 1, 2003
1357	#03-49	"3 Cosmic Seasons At A Glance In Mid December"	--	Jack Horkheimer	December 8, 2003
1358	#03-50	"A Breathtaking Pairing Of The Evening Star And The Moon On Christmas Night! And This Year's Winter Solstice"	--	Jack Horkheimer	December 15, 2003
1359	#03-51	"Saturn At Its Closest, Highest and Best At Midnight New Year's Eve"	--	Jack Horkheimer	December 22, 2003
1360	#03-52	"Four Bright Planets Ring In The New Year"	--	Jack Horkheimer	December 29, 2003
