= Jack Horkheimer: Star Hustler (1996 season) =

- No. of episodes: 53

Release
- Original network: PBS
- Original release: January 1 – December 30, 1996

Season chronology
- ← Previous (1995 season) Next → (1997 season)

The 1996 season of the astronomy TV show Jack Horkheimer: Star Hustler starring Jack Horkheimer started on January 1, 1996. During this season, the show still had its original name, Jack Horkheimer: Star Hustler. The show's episode numbering scheme changed several times during its run to coincide with major events in the show's history. During the 1996 season, in May, the show acquired an Internet presence along with its own website, starhusler.com. The episode numbers started including a "-I" appended to the end, marking the event. The official Star Gazer website hosts the complete scripts for each of the shows.

== 1996 season ==
No. overall	No. in season	Title	Directed by	Written by	Original release date
943	#336	"--"	--	Jack Horkheimer	January 1, 1996
944	#337	"--"	--	Jack Horkheimer	January 8, 1996
945	#338	"--"	--	Jack Horkheimer	January 15, 1996
946	#339	"--"	--	Jack Horkheimer	January 22, 1996
947	#340	"--"	--	Jack Horkheimer	January 29, 1996
948	#341	"--"	--	Jack Horkheimer	February 5, 1996
949	#342	"--"	--	Jack Horkheimer	February 12, 1996
950	#343	"--"	--	Jack Horkheimer	February 19, 1996
951	#344	"--"	--	Jack Horkheimer	February 26, 1996
952	#345	"--"	--	Jack Horkheimer	March 4, 1996
953	#346	"--"	--	Jack Horkheimer	March 11, 1996
954	#347	"--"	--	Jack Horkheimer	March 18, 1996
955	#348	"--"	--	Jack Horkheimer	March 25, 1996
956	#349	"--"	--	Jack Horkheimer	April 1, 1996
957	#350	"--"	--	Jack Horkheimer	April 8, 1996
958	#351	"--"	--	Jack Horkheimer	April 15, 1996
959	#352	"--"	--	Jack Horkheimer	April 22, 1996
960	#353	"--"	--	Jack Horkheimer	April 29, 1996
961	#354-I	"If Orion Is Leaving Us Can the Scorpion Be Far Behind?"	--	Jack Horkheimer	May 6, 1996
962	#355-I	"The Last Venus/Moon Picture Show"	--	Jack Horkheimer	May 13, 1996
963	#356-I	"Memorial and Decoration Day Summer Preview, and One Planet Alone"	--	Jack Horkheimer	May 20, 1996
964	#357-I	"Awesome Arcturus: Star of A Million Years"	--	Jack Horkheimer	May 27, 1996
965	#358-I	"Mars and Mercury Mornings, and the Search for the Morning Star"	--	Jack Horkheimer	June 3, 1996
966	#359-I	"Day Star Star-Rise Day and How to Win A Pair of Night Sky Binoculars"	--	Jack Horkheimer	June 10, 1996
967	#360-I	"Earth At Aphelion and A Jovian 4th of July"	--	Jack Horkheimer	June 17, 1996
968	#361-I	"The Blue Moons of June and July 1996: A Modern Mystery; And How to Win A Telescope"	--	Jack Horkheimer	June 24, 1996
969	#362-I	"What Jupiter Would Look Like if it were our Moon's Distance Away"	--	Jack Horkheimer	July 1, 1996
970	#363-I	"A Venus at Greatest Brilliancy/Old Moon Spectacular! And A Red Mars/Red Star Triangle"	--	Jack Horkheimer	July 8, 1996
971	#364-I	"The Biggest Planet, The Biggest Star and The Biggest Full Moon of the Year!"	--	Jack Horkheimer	July 15, 1996
972	#365-I	"Blaze Star: The Incredible Mystery of the Lost Jewel of the Northern Crown: Part 1"	--	Jack Horkheimer	July 22, 1996
973	#366-I	"The Incredible Mystery of the Lost Star of the Northern Crown: Part 2, Conclusion"	--	Jack Horkheimer	July 29, 1996
974	#367-I	"A Great Moon/Venus Duet and A Great Opportunity for This Year's August 11th & 12th Perseid Meteor Shower!"	--	Jack Horkheimer	August 5, 1996
975	#368-I	"Planets Beyond Our Solar System and Encounter with Tiber"	--	Jack Horkheimer	August 12, 1996
976	#369-I	"Vega: Arc Light of Summer Nights and The Apex of the Sun's Way"	--	Jack Horkheimer	August 19, 1996
977	#370-I	"A Lovely Conjunction and A Great Cosmic Line-Up Next To the Winter Triangle"	--	Jack Horkheimer	August 26, 1996
978	#371-I	"A Hale-Bopp Update! And A Great Celestial Line-Up Reminder"	--	Jack Horkheimer	September 2, 1996
979	#372-I	"Eclipse of the Harvest / Saturn Moon and How To Watch It"	--	Jack Horkheimer	September 9, 1996
980	#373-I	"Eclipse of the Harvest / Saturn Moon and How To Win A Telescope Just By Watching, Part II"	--	Jack Horkheimer	September 16, 1996
981	#374-I	"Saturn At Opposition / An Eclipse Reminder and The Loneliest Star In Heaven"	--	Jack Horkheimer	September 23, 1996
982	#375-I	"A Star Hustler Classic: Season without Giants or Time of the Quiet Sky"	--	Jack Horkheimer	September 30, 1996
983	#376-I	"A Tail of Two Comets: One Of Which Is At Its Brightest This Week!"	--	Jack Horkheimer	October 7, 1996
984	#377-I	"A Kitchen Cosmos: Recipe for A Universe"	--	Jack Horkheimer	October 14, 1996
985	#378-I	"A Bull's Eye Moon & The Swiftness of Our Nearest Neighbor"	--	Jack Horkheimer	October 21, 1996
986	#379-I	"The Pleiades Hour & The End of the World"	--	Jack Horkheimer	October 28, 1996
987	#380-I	"Three Outer Planets, Two Comets and One Moon"	--	Jack Horkheimer	November 4, 1996
988	#381-I	"This Weekend's Leonid Meteor Shower: A Roaring Lion or A Pussy Cat"	--	Jack Horkheimer	November 11, 1996
989	#382-I	"A Skyful of Birds for Thanksgiving"	--	Jack Horkheimer	November 18, 1996
990	#383-I	"The Surest Sign of Winter and Why the Shortest Day if the Year Doesn't Feel Like The Shortest Day of the Year"	--	Jack Horkheimer	November 25, 1996
991	#384-I	"Dramatic December Sky Drama: Our Moon and the Two Brightest Planets"	--	Jack Horkheimer	December 2, 1996
992	#385-I	"This Week's Impact with an Ancient Asteroid and How To Watch It."	--	Jack Horkheimer	December 9, 1996
993	#386-I	"The Earliest Winter in 99 Years and May Your Christmas Eve Be Bright, Very Bright!"	--	Jack Horkheimer	December 16, 1996
994	#387-I	"A Full Moon For Christmas... And The Cross and The Manger: A Cosmic Christmas Tale Retold"	--	Jack Horkheimer	December 23, 1996
995	#388-I	"The New Year's Eve Star: A Story Retold"	--	Jack Horkheimer	December 30, 1996
