= Jack Horkheimer: Star Hustler (1997 season) =

- No. of episodes: 52

Release
- Original network: PBS
- Original release: January 6 – December 29, 1997

Season chronology
- ← Previous (1996 season) Next → (1998 season)

The 1997 season of the astronomy TV show Jack Horkheimer: Star Hustler starring Jack Horkheimer started on January 6, 1997. Towards the end of this season, the show title changed from Jack Horkheimer: Star Hustler to Jack Horkheimer: Star Gazer. The change occurred for the November 10, 1997 episode because people complained that Internet searches for the show were turning up the adult magazine Hustler instead of the TV show itself.

The show's episode numbering scheme changed several times during its run to coincide with major events in the show's history. During the 1997 season, in November, the show's numbering was restarted at -001 and included an SG at the beginning to mark the change from Start Hustler to Star Gazer.

The February 3rd show was the 1000th episode of the series. The official Star Gazer website hosts the complete scripts for each of the shows.

== 1997 season ==
No. overall	No. in season	Title	Directed by	Written by	Original release date
996	#389-I	"Weekend of the First Planet and a Saturn-Moon Conjunction"	--	Jack Horkheimer	January 6, 1997
997	#390-I	"Don't Worry About Winter, After All it's The Shortest Season of the Year"	--	Jack Horkheimer	January 13, 1997
998	#391-I	"Now Is the Time To Start Your Comet Hale-Bopp Watch!"	--	Jack Horkheimer	January 20, 1997
999	#392-I	"A Red Planet for A Green Holiday!"	--	Jack Horkheimer	January 27, 1997
1000	#393-I	"A Star Hustler Milestone, Closest New Moon of '97 and A Super Planet Parade"	--	Jack Horkheimer	February 3, 1997
1001	#394-I	"Comet of the Century? Update!"	--	Jack Horkheimer	February 10, 1997
1002	#395-I	"Get Ready for the Rusty, Dusty Planet of the Year!"	--	Jack Horkheimer	February 17, 1997
1003	#396-I	"A Return Journey to Orion's Belt"	--	Jack Horkheimer	February 24, 1997
1004	#397-I	"March 1997: A Super Sensational, Celestially Stupendous, You're Not Gonna Believe It, Month For Star Gazers"	--	Jack Horkheimer	March 3, 1997
1005	#398-I	"A Comet Hale-Bopp Update, and St. Patrick's Day on Mars!"	--	Jack Horkheimer	March 10, 1997
1006	#399-I	"Super Week! Comet Hale-Bopp At Its Closest! Mars At Its Brightest! And A Palm Sunday Eclipse!"	--	Jack Horkheimer	March 17, 1997
1007	#400-I	"Super Comet Hale-Bopp! The Real Nitty Gritty and Fun Facts!"	--	Jack Horkheimer	March 24, 1997
1008	#401-I	"The Secret Life of Hale-Bopp"	--	Jack Horkheimer	March 31, 1997
1009	#402-I	"When, Where & How To Watch Comet Hale-Bopp At Its Best During April!"	--	Jack Horkheimer	April 7, 1997
1010	#403-I	"Death of an Unknown Comet, and Sensational Movies of Our Sun"	--	Jack Horkheimer	April 14, 1997
1011	#404-I	"Last Two Weeks To See Hale-Bopp! For 2400 Years!"	--	Jack Horkheimer	April 21, 1997
1012	#405-I	"The Cat/Moon Goddess and the Comet; an Evening to Remember"	--	Jack Horkheimer	April 28, 1997
1013	#406-I	"Farewell to Hale-Bopp: The Exquisite Monster Comet of the 20th Century!"	--	Jack Horkheimer	May 5, 1997
1014	#407-I	"Measuring Distances In the Sky Using Just Your Hand and the Big Dipper"	--	Jack Horkheimer	May 12, 1997
1015	#408-I	"Moon Finding the Two Giant Planets of Summer: A Preview"	--	Jack Horkheimer	May 19, 1997
1016	#409-I	"Preview of the Christmas Star, A UFO and A Diminished St. Patrick's Day Planet"	--	Jack Horkheimer	May 26, 1997
1017	#410-I	"The Moon and Mars on Triskaidekaphobia Day"	--	Jack Horkheimer	June 2, 1997
1018	#411-I	"Day Star Day: A Celebration of the Summer Solstice and the Star We Call Our Sun"	--	Jack Horkheimer	June 9, 1997
1019	#412-I	"Moon To Crash Into Saturn Next Week! (Well, Almost)"	--	Jack Horkheimer	June 16, 1997
1020	#413-I	"A Special Sky & The 4th Of July"	--	Jack Horkheimer	June 23, 1997
1021	#414-I	"The '3 Tenors' of Summer: A Cosmic Trio"	--	Jack Horkheimer	June 30, 1997
1022	#415-I	"Zubenelgenubi and Zubeneschamali: The Two Stars of Summer You Just Love to Pronounce"	--	Jack Horkheimer	July 7, 1997
1023	#416-I	"Summer Ballet of Two Planets and A Star: A Celestial Pas De Trois"	--	Jack Horkheimer	July 14, 1997
1024	#417-I	"A Planet Named George: Tale of A Celestial Gas Bag"	--	Jack Horkheimer	July 21, 1997
1025	#418-I	"Plan now For the Perseids! The Most Famous Meteor Shower of All Time"	--	Jack Horkheimer	July 28, 1997
1026	#419-I	"The Pathway of the Planets and How to Find It"	--	Jack Horkheimer	August 4, 1997
1027	#420-I	"The Great Late-Summer Jupiter Show"	--	Jack Horkheimer	August 11, 1997
1028	#421-I	"Kitty in the Cosmos: A Stinging Tail/Tale"	--	Jack Horkheimer	August 18, 1997
1029	#422-I	"Cosmic Goodies for the Labor Day Weekend and Virgo Meets Venus"	--	Jack Horkheimer	August 25, 1997
1030	#423-I	"A Super September Planet Parade"	--	Jack Horkheimer	September 1, 1997
1031	#424-I	"The Wonderful Week of the Harvest Moon"	--	Jack Horkheimer	September 8, 1997
1032	#425-I	"Mercury at Its Best and: It's 'Sun-Visor-Equinox Time' Once Again"	--	Jack Horkheimer	September 15, 1997
1033	#426-I	"Why Is Fall Called 'Fall'? Or, The 'Season of Descent'"	--	Jack Horkheimer	September 22, 1997
1034	#427-I	"How to Make 'Contact' With Vega"	--	Jack Horkheimer	September 29, 1997
1035	#428-I	"Parade Of the Planets and Saturn at Its Best"	--	Jack Horkheimer	October 6, 1997
1036	#429-I	"Mars, Venus and Antares: A Triple Whammy Weekend"	--	Jack Horkheimer	October 13, 1997
1037	#430-I	"Autumn Stars; And Why The Stars Change With The Seasons"	--	Jack Horkheimer	October 20, 1997
1038	#431-I	"Pegasus and The Pleiades; And the Farthest you can see With the Naked Eye"	--	Jack Horkheimer	October 27, 1997
1039	#432-I	"Star Hustler is 21 years Old This Week! Say Hello To Star Gazer!"	--	Jack Horkheimer	November 3, 1997
1040	#SG 001-I	"Queen Cassiopeia: Vanity and Its Cosmic Reward"	--	Jack Horkheimer	November 10, 1997
1041	#SG 002-I	"Perseus and The Pleiades: Double Your Cluster, Double Your Fun"	--	Jack Horkheimer	November 17, 1997
1042	#SG 003-I	"A Grand Gathering Of Planets For Thanksgiving: The Last Such Of The Century"	--	Jack Horkheimer	November 24, 1997
1043	#SG 004-I	"Last Week for the Grand Gathering of the Planets and Venus at Its Greatest Brilliancy"	--	Jack Horkheimer	December 1, 1997
1044	#SG 005-I	"The Moon of the Short Shadows"	--	Jack Horkheimer	December 8, 1997
1045	#SG 006-I	"Venus and Mars at Their Closest on the First Day of Winter: And why the Winter Solstice Was A Time Of Ancient Fear"	--	Jack Horkheimer	December 15, 1997
1046	#SG 007-I	"The New Year's Eve Star: A Different Way to Welcome in the New Year"	--	Jack Horkheimer	December 22, 1997
1047	#SG 008-I	"New Year Goodies, The Great Jupiter / Mars Conjunction, And Kiss The Goddess of Love Good-bye"	--	Jack Horkheimer	December 29, 1997
