= Jack Horkheimer: Star Gazer (2002 season) =

- No. of episodes: 53

Release
- Original network: PBS
- Original release: December 31, 2001 – December 30, 2002

Season chronology
- ← Previous (2001 season) Next → (2003 season)

The 2002 season of the astronomy TV show Jack Horkheimer: Star Gazer starring Jack Horkheimer started on December 31, 2001. The show's episode numbering scheme changed several times during its run to coincide with major events in the show's history. The official Star Gazer website hosts the complete scripts for each of the shows.

== 2002 season ==
No. overall	No. in season	Title	Directed by	Written by	Original release date
1256	#02-01	"Earth Closest to the Sun This Week, Mercury at Its Best Evening Appearance, And Jupiter at Its Closest and Brightest for the Entire Year!"	--	Jack Horkheimer	December 31, 2001
1257	#02-02	"The Winter Hexagon and The Summer Triangle in the Sky at the Same Time, Right Now In The Dead Of Winter, Would You Believe?"	--	Jack Horkheimer	January 7, 2002
1258	#02-03	"The Moon Has Two Near Misses with Two Planets!"	--	Jack Horkheimer	January 14, 2002
1259	#02-04	"The Shoulder and Knee Stars of Winter's Most Famous Constellation, Orion the Hunter"	--	Jack Horkheimer	January 21, 2002
1260	#02-05	"The Wonderful Stars of Orion's Belt and How They Turned Me On To Star Gazing"	--	Jack Horkheimer	January 28, 2002
1261	#02-06	"A Giant Red Star for Valentine's Day and How to Find It"	--	Jack Horkheimer	February 4, 2002
1262	#02-07	"The Moon Has Two Super Meetings With Two Super Planets and Plays "Now You See It / Now You Don't" With Saturn"	--	Jack Horkheimer	February 11, 2002
1263	#02-08	"The Two Incredibly Close Full Moons Of 2002 And the Farthest"	--	Jack Horkheimer	February 18, 2002
1264	#02-09	"Saturn at Its Best Since The 70's"	--	Jack Horkheimer	February 25, 2002
1265	#02-10	"Venus Returns for St. Patrick's Day and Getting Ready for the Great Planetary Lineup"	--	Jack Horkheimer	March 4, 2002
1266	#02-11	"Why Is Spring Called Spring? And What Does Spring have to do With the Yellow Line In The Middle Of the Road?"	--	Jack Horkheimer	March 11, 2002
1267	#02-12	"The Second Biggest Full Moon of 2002 Glides Across the Sky with the Brightest Star Of Virgo"	--	Jack Horkheimer	March 18, 2002
1268	#02-13	"Two Sure Signs Of Spring: Low Lyin' Orion and A High Flyin' Lion"	--	Jack Horkheimer	March 25, 2002
1269	#02-14	"How to Look Back In Time Using the Most Famous Star Pattern of Them All"	--	Jack Horkheimer	April 1, 2002
1270	#02-15	"The Great Planetary lineup Begins and You Can Watch It All With Just The Naked Eye"	--	Jack Horkheimer	April 8, 2002
1271	#02-16	"Celebrate National Astronomy Day This Weekend With The Best Planetary Lineup In Decades"	--	Jack Horkheimer	April 15, 2002
1272	#02-17	"The Incredible Planetary Pin Ball Game During the Great Planetary Lineup"	--	Jack Horkheimer	April 22, 2002
1273	#02-18	"Planets in A Super Huddle the Great Planetary Gathering Continues And Becomes Even More Spectacular"	--	Jack Horkheimer	April 29, 2002
1274	#02-19	"May 14 Is Super Venus/Moon Day! And The Great Planet Gathering And Dance Continues"	--	Jack Horkheimer	May 6, 2002
1275	#02-20	"Awesome Arcturus: Star of A Million Years"	--	Jack Horkheimer	May 13, 2002
1276	#02-21	"The Two Brightest Planets Meet While the Twin Stars of Gemini Look On"	--	Jack Horkheimer	May 20, 2002
1277	#02-22	"Venus and Jupiter Versus the Gemini Twins"	--	Jack Horkheimer	May 27, 2002
1278	#02-23	"Even Though the Great Planetary Lineup is Over, The Super Jupiter/Venus/Moon Sky Show Continues"	--	Jack Horkheimer	June 3, 2002
1279	#02-24	"Day Star Day: An Annual "Star Gazer" Celebration Of The Summer Solstice And Our Closest Star"	--	Jack Horkheimer	June 10, 2002
1280	#02-25	"What the Stars Look Like On the First Nights of Summer"	--	Jack Horkheimer	June 17, 2002
1281	#02-26	"How to See A Super Special Sky Show Right After the Fireworks on The 4th Of July"	--	Jack Horkheimer	June 24, 2002
1282	#02-27	"Earth At Aphelion; Saturn Meets the Moon: And Venus Meets the Heart of Leo"	--	Jack Horkheimer	July 1, 2002
1283	#02-28	"The Two Mairzy Doats and Dozey Doats and Supercalifragilisticexpialidocius Stars of the Cosmos"	--	Jack Horkheimer	July 8, 2002
1284	#02-29	"A Cosmic City of A Million Stars and How to Find It"	--	Jack Horkheimer	July 15, 2002
1285	#02-30	"The Wonderful Cat's Eyes of Summer Skies"	--	Jack Horkheimer	July 22, 2002
1286	#02-31	"How to Get Started in Astronomy and The Two Comets That Never Were"	--	Jack Horkheimer	July 29, 2002
1287	#02-32	"Venus Meets the Moon and The Night of St. Lawrence's Tears"	--	Jack Horkheimer	August 5, 2002
1288	#02-33	"The Great Mars Approach Begins! As Mars Prepares For Its Closest Meeting with Earth in 60,000 Years!"	--	Jack Horkheimer	August 12, 2002
1289	#02-34	"An Ancient Archer Aims His Arrow at the Heart of the Scorpion and The Heart of the Galaxy"	--	Jack Horkheimer	August 19, 2002
1290	#02-35	"The Summer Triangle Blazes Overhead For the Labor Day Weekend"	--	Jack Horkheimer	August 26, 2002
1291	#02-36	"Last Chance to See Venus and the Moon as an Evening Pair and A Wonderful Star Named Spica"	--	Jack Horkheimer	September 2, 2002
1292	#02-37	"The Annual Return of the False Dawn of Omar Khayyam and How to Find It Next Week"	--	Jack Horkheimer	September 9, 2002
1293	#02-38	"Weekend Of the Harvest Moon and The Autumnal Equinox"	--	Jack Horkheimer	September 16, 2002
1294	#02-39	"Venus at Greatest Brilliancy and Two Wonderful Planets"	--	Jack Horkheimer	September 23, 2002
1295	#02-40	"Mars And Mercury Pair Up And the Rival Of Mars Says Good Bye"	--	Jack Horkheimer	September 30, 2002
1296	#02-41	"The Early Bird Not Only Gets the Worm, but also 4 Pre-dawn Planets Lined Up In A Row"	--	Jack Horkheimer	October 7, 2002
1297	#02-42	"This Year's Very Special Hunter's Moon"	--	Jack Horkheimer	October 14, 2002
1298	#02-43	"The Seven Sisters and Halloween, And the End of the World"	--	Jack Horkheimer	October 21, 2002
1299	#02-44	"How to Look Back In Time Over Two Million Years"	--	Jack Horkheimer	October 28, 2002
1300	#02-45	"Get Ready for What May Be the Last Great Leonid Meteor Storm in 100 Years!"	--	Jack Horkheimer	November 4, 2002
1301	#02-46	"Planets Aplenty for Both Night Owls and Early Birds"	--	Jack Horkheimer	November 11, 2002
1302	#02-47	"Our Star Gazer Annual "3 Cosmic Birds For Thanksgiving" Show"	--	Jack Horkheimer	November 18, 2002
1303	#02-48	"Begin Your December with A Super Celestial Triangle"	--	Jack Horkheimer	November 25, 2002
1304	#02-49	"December's Days Of Earliest Sunsets Venus Reaches Greatest Brilliancy And Orion Announces The Coming Of Winter"	--	Jack Horkheimer	December 2, 2002
1305	#02-50	"Saturn Comes Into Opposition December 17th And Will Be At Its Biggest And Brightest It Ever Gets"	--	Jack Horkheimer	December 9, 2002
1306	#02-51	"What Is the Winter Solstice Really All About?"	--	Jack Horkheimer	December 16, 2002
1307	#02-52	"Celebrate New Year's Eve with the New Year's Eve Star"	--	Jack Horkheimer	December 23, 2002
1308	#02-53	"2003: The Year Of The Amateur Telescope / A Cosmic Preview"	--	Jack Horkheimer	December 30, 2002
