= Jack Horkheimer: Star Hustler (1976 season) =

- No. of episodes: 9

Release
- Original network: PBS
- Original release: November 4 – December 29, 1976

Season chronology
- ← Previous; Season 1975 Next → (1977 season)

This is an episode list for the 1976 season of the astronomy TV show Jack Horkheimer: Star Hustler starring Jack Horkheimer. During this season, the show still had its original name, Jack Horkheimer: Star Hustler. The show's episode numbering scheme changed several times during its run to coincide with major events in the show's history.

== 1976 season ==
No. overall	No. in season	Title	Directed by	Written by	Original release date
1	TBA	"The Hunter's Moon"	--	Jack Horkheimer	November 4, 1976
2	TBA	TBA	--	Jack Horkheimer	November 11, 1976
3	TBA	TBA	--	Jack Horkheimer	November 18, 1976
4	TBA	TBA	--	Jack Horkheimer	November 25, 1976
5	TBA	TBA	--	Jack Horkheimer	December 2, 1976
6	TBA	TBA	--	Jack Horkheimer	December 9, 1976
7	TBA	TBA	--	Jack Horkheimer	December 16, 1976
8	TBA	TBA	--	Jack Horkheimer	December 23, 1976
9	TBA	TBA	--	Jack Horkheimer	December 30, 1976
