= Jack Horkheimer: Star Gazer (2008 season) =

Season of television series

- No. of episodes: 52

Release
- Original network: PBS
- Original release: January 7 – December 29, 2008

Season chronology
- ← Previous (2007 season) Next → (2009 season)

The 2008 season of the astronomy TV show Jack Horkheimer: Star Gazer starring Jack Horkheimer started on January 7, 2008. The show's episode numbering scheme changed several times during its run to coincide with major events in the show's history. The official Star Gazer website hosts the complete scripts for each of the shows.

== 2008 season ==
No. overall	No. in season	Title	Directed by	Written by	Original release date
1570	#08-01	"The Two Brightest Planets Prepare For A Super Close Meeting On Feb. 1st!"	--	Jack Horkheimer	January 7, 2008
1571	#08-02	"See Mars And The Red Triangle Now! And Compare The Red Planet With The Brightest Star!"	--	Jack Horkheimer	January 14, 2008
1572	#08-03	"Next Week Is The Week When The Two Brightest Planets Meet!"	--	Jack Horkheimer	January 21, 2008
1573	#08-04	"How To Use Orion The Hunter To Find His Two Hunting Dogs"	--	Jack Horkheimer	January 28, 2008
1574	#08-05	"The Moon And Mars And The Valentine's Star"	--	Jack Horkheimer	February 4, 2008
1575	#08-06	"Don't Miss Next Week's Total Eclipse Of The Moon"	--	Jack Horkheimer	February 11, 2008
1576	#08-07	"See The Beautiful Ringed Planet At Its Very Best For 2008, This Weekend"	--	Jack Horkheimer	February 18, 2008
1577	#08-08	"Orion The Hunter's Wonderful "Fuzzy" Star"	--	Jack Horkheimer	February 25, 2008
1578	#08-09	"The Two Stars Above And The Two Stars Below The Fabled Belt Stars Of Orion"	--	Jack Horkheimer	March 3, 2008
1579	#08-10	"The Gibbous Moon Meets The Heart Of Leo And The Lord Of The Rings And Mars Is Super High At Sunset"	--	Jack Horkheimer	March 10, 2008
1580	#08-11	"A Pithy Poem For The First Day Of Spring"	--	Jack Horkheimer	March 17, 2008
1581	#08-12	"Leo The Lion Chases Orion"	--	Jack Horkheimer	March 24, 2008
1582	#08-13	"April 8th's Occult Occurrence: Watch The Moon Hide The Seven Sisters"	--	Jack Horkheimer	March 31, 2008
1583	#08-14	"Don't Miss The Mars And Gemini Twins Cosmic Triangle"	--	Jack Horkheimer	April 7, 2008
1584	#08-15	"Fun With The Big Dipper In April"	--	Jack Horkheimer	April 14, 2008
1585	#08-16	"The Naked Truth About The North Star"	--	Jack Horkheimer	April 21, 2008
1586	#08-17	"Planet #1 At Its Best Evening Viewing For 2008! And Celebrate National Astronomy Day"	--	Jack Horkheimer	April 28, 2008
1587	#08-18	"Don't Miss Mercury At Its Best This Week And Next"	--	Jack Horkheimer	May 5, 2008
1588	#08-19	"Mars And The Manger And The Beehive"	--	Jack Horkheimer	May 12, 2008
1589	#08-20	"The Ringed Planet And Two Great Stars For Memorial Day Weekend"	--	Jack Horkheimer	May 19, 2008
1590	#08-21	"An Exquisite Moon Visits Two Evening Planets And A Great Star!"	--	Jack Horkheimer	May 26, 2008
1591	#08-22	"Bootes And The Brightest Star That Opened The World's Fair Of 1933"	--	Jack Horkheimer	June 2, 2008
1592	#08-23	"Celebrate Day Star Day On Summer Solstice Weekend"	--	Jack Horkheimer	June 9, 2008
1593	#08-24	"Why Is The First Day Of Summer Called The Summer Solstice?"	--	Jack Horkheimer	June 16, 2008
1594	#08-25	"A Sky Full Of Wonders For Your 4th Of July Independence Day Week"	--	Jack Horkheimer	June 23, 2008
1595	#08-26	"See Mars And Saturn At Their Closest Until 2022"	--	Jack Horkheimer	June 30, 2008
1596	#08-27	"This Week Jupiter is At Its Closest, Biggest And Brightest For 2008!"	--	Jack Horkheimer	July 7, 2008
1597	#08-28	"Summer Skies At Night Are Sheer Delight... So See Them Now!"	--	Jack Horkheimer	July 14, 2008
1598	#08-29	"The King Of The Planets And An Emperor Star Dominate Southern Summer Skies"	--	Jack Horkheimer	July 21, 2008
1599	#08-30	"How To Find The Two Comets That Never Were"	--	Jack Horkheimer	July 28, 2008
1600	#08-31	"Don't Miss Next Week's Night Of St. Lawrence's Tears / Perseid Meteor Shower"	--	Jack Horkheimer	August 4, 2008
1601	#08-32	"See If You Can See All 8 Planets This Week"	--	Jack Horkheimer	August 11, 2008
1602	#08-33	"Next Week Is The Perfect Time To See The Milky Way In All Its Wonder"	--	Jack Horkheimer	August 18, 2008
1603	#08-34	"Celebrate September With A Triangle Of Planets! And Love And War Meet"	--	Jack Horkheimer	August 25, 2008
1604	#08-35	"Mars And Venus Slam Into Each Other! And Uranus At Its Closest And Brightest For The Entire Year"	--	Jack Horkheimer	September 1, 2008
1605	#08-36	"The Great Harvest Moon Illusion And How You Can Prove It's An Illusion"	--	Jack Horkheimer	September 8, 2008
1606	#08-37	"The Super Bright Star Which Shines Overhead Every Year On The Autumnal Equinox"	--	Jack Horkheimer	September 15, 2008
1607	#08-38	"The Return Of The False Dawn Of Omar Khayyam"	--	Jack Horkheimer	September 22, 2008
1608	#08-39	"Say Farewell To Summer's Cosmic Triangle And Welcome Autumn's Cosmic Square"	--	Jack Horkheimer	September 29, 2008
1609	#08-40	"The Hunter's Moon, Mercury At Its Best, Jupiter The King And UFO Alert!"	--	Jack Horkheimer	October 6, 2008
1610	#08-41	"How To Use The Moon To Find The Ringed Planet Just Before Sunrise"	--	Jack Horkheimer	October 13, 2008
1611	#08-42	"An Exquisite Moon Pays A Visit To The Two Brightest Planets, Starting on Halloween"	--	Jack Horkheimer	October 20, 2008
1612	#08-43	"The Seven Sinister Sisters Fly High Across The Sky At Midnight On Halloween"	--	Jack Horkheimer	October 27, 2008
1613	#08-44	"The Exquisite Double Star Cluster Beloved By Ancient Emperors"	--	Jack Horkheimer	November 3, 2008
1614	#08-45	"Watch The Two Brightest Planets Race Toward Each Other For A Super Close Meeting"	--	Jack Horkheimer	November 10, 2008
1615	#08-46	"The Return Of Three Cosmic Birds For Thanksgiving And The Two Brightest Planets Meet"	--	Jack Horkheimer	November 17, 2008
1616	#08-47	"The Three Brightest Night Time Objects Meet In A Terrific Extraterrestrial Trio"	--	Jack Horkheimer	November 24, 2008
1617	#08-48	"Get Ready For The Largest And Closest Full Moon Of 2008 Followed By The Largest And Closest Full Moon Of 2009"	--	Jack Horkheimer	December 1, 2008
1618	#08-49	"Why Doesn't The Shortest Day Of The Year Feel Like The Shortest Day Of The Year?"	--	Jack Horkheimer	December 8, 2008
1619	#08-50	"The So-Called "Christmas Star" Returns Accompanied By A Companion"	--	Jack Horkheimer	December 15, 2008
1620	#08-51	"Special Cosmic Goodies For Christmas Week! And A Super Special Occurrence For New Year's Eve!"	--	Jack Horkheimer	December 22, 2008
1621	#08-52	"Welcome In 2009 With The Brightest Planet And The Brightest Star Plus The Lord Of The Rings"	--	Jack Horkheimer	December 29, 2008
