= Jack Horkheimer: Star Gazer (2005 season) =

- No. of episodes: 52

Release
- Original network: PBS
- Original release: January 3 – December 26, 2005

Season chronology
- ← Previous (2004 season) Next → (2006 season)

The 2005 season of the astronomy TV show Jack Horkheimer: Star Gazer starring Jack Horkheimer started on January 3, 2005. The show's episode numbering scheme changed several times during its run to coincide with major events in the show's history. The official Star Gazer website hosts the complete scripts for each of the shows.

== 2005 season ==
No. overall	No. in season	Title	Directed by	Written by	Original release date
1413	#05-01	"All Five Of The Naked Eye Planets Ring In The New Year"	--	Jack Horkheimer	January 3, 2005
1414	#05-02	"Saturn Is At Opposition This Week And At Its Closest, Brightest and Biggest For The Entire Year"	--	Jack Horkheimer	January 10, 2005
1415	#05-03	"How To Have A Bit Of Fun With The Smallest Full Moon Of The Year Next Week"	--	Jack Horkheimer	January 17, 2005
1416	#05-04	"Punxsutawney Phil Is Joined By Two Celestial Tongue Twisters And Other Sky Goodies On Groundhog Day Morn"	--	Jack Horkheimer	January 24, 2005
1417	#05-05	"Saturn Takes Center Stage Among Winter's Hexagon Of Bright Stars!"	--	Jack Horkheimer	January 31, 2005
1418	#05-06	"Give Your Love Three Cosmic Jewels This Valentine's Day"	--	Jack Horkheimer	February 7, 2005
1419	#05-07	"Some Nifty Celestial Triangles For Early Evening And Early Morning Viewing"	--	Jack Horkheimer	February 14, 2005
1420	#05-08	"Our Newest Cosmic Neighbor Occults And Hides The Second Biggest Star We Can See With The Naked Eye"	--	Jack Horkheimer	February 21, 2005
1421	#05-09	"The Three Wonderful Stars Of The Winter Triangle"	--	Jack Horkheimer	February 28, 2005
1422	#05-10	"Mercury At Its Very Best For 2005!"	--	Jack Horkheimer	March 7, 2005
1423	#05-11	"Find The Two Largest Planets The Next Two Weekends Using the Moon"	--	Jack Horkheimer	March 14, 2005
1424	#05-12	"Happy First Day Of Spring To You And Happy New Year To America's Founding Fathers"	--	Jack Horkheimer	March 21, 2005
1425	#05-13	"Jupiter At Its Best Sunday Night The 3rd Find Mars With The Moon On The 4th And A Partial Eclipse Of The Sun On The 8th"	--	Jack Horkheimer	March 28, 2005
1426	#05-14	"An Exquisite Crescent Moon Pays A Very Close Visit To The Pleiades The Seven Sisters"	--	Jack Horkheimer	April 4, 2005
1427	#05-15	"Get Ready For National Astronomy Day This Saturday April 16th! The Biggest And Best yet"	--	Jack Horkheimer	April 11, 2005
1428	#05-16	"Jupiter Is At Its Closest To Earth And Farthest From The Sun This Month"	--	Jack Horkheimer	April 18, 2005
1429	#05-17	"An Update On One Have The Most Beloved Star Patterns In The Heavens: The Big Dipper"	--	Jack Horkheimer	April 25, 2005
1430	#05-18	"Arc to Arcturus, Then Speed On To Spica, An Easy Way To Find Two Wonderful Stars By Using The Big Dipper"	--	Jack Horkheimer	May 2, 2005
1431	#05-19	"How To Use Planet #4 to Find Planet #7 This Weekend"	--	Jack Horkheimer	May 9, 2005
1432	#05-20	"Star Gazer's "Star Gazing For Beginners" Part 1"	--	Jack Horkheimer	May 16, 2005
1433	#05-21	"Three Wonderful Planets And Several Bright Stars For Your Memorial Day Weekend"	--	Jack Horkheimer	May 23, 2005
1434	#05-22	"An Absolutely Spectacular Month For Venus, Saturn And Mercury"	--	Jack Horkheimer	May 30, 2005
1435	#05-23	"Why Do The Stars Move Hour After Hour, Season After Season?"	--	Jack Horkheimer	June 6, 2005
1436	#05-24	"Just What Is A Star Anyway... And How Far Away Are They?"	--	Jack Horkheimer	June 13, 2005
1437	#05-25	"An Absolutely Spectacular Super Close Meeting Of Three Planets Occurs This Week And Next"	--	Jack Horkheimer	June 20, 2005
1438	#05-26	"The First Ten Days Of July Are Fantastic For Planet Gazers"	--	Jack Horkheimer	June 27, 2005
1439	#05-27	"Venus And Mercury Continue Their Pas De Deux, And The Moon Visits Regulus And Jupiter"	--	Jack Horkheimer	July 4, 2005
1440	#05-28	"The Moon Hides A Giant Red Star And Venus Visits A Blue Star"	--	Jack Horkheimer	July 11, 2005
1441	#05-29	"Use The Moon To Find Mars Which Is Now Brighter Than Almost All The Stars In The Sky"	--	Jack Horkheimer	July 18, 2005
1442	#05-30	"The Three Bright Stars Of The Summer Triangle Ride High In August's Night Sky"	--	Jack Horkheimer	July 25, 2005
1443	#05-31	"Next Week The Moon Visits The Two Brightest Planets And The Perseid Meteor Shower Visits Earth"	--	Jack Horkheimer	August 1, 2005
1444	#05-32	"Use The Moon This Weekend To Find My Two Favorite Summer Constellations"	--	Jack Horkheimer	August 8, 2005
1445	#05-33	"A Preview Of Winter's Stars In August And Saturn And Mercury Are Visited By The Moon"	--	Jack Horkheimer	August 15, 2005
1446	#05-34	"The Two Brightest Planets Have A Super Close Meeting And Mars Doubles In Brightness"	--	Jack Horkheimer	August 22, 2005
1447	#05-35	"The Three Brightest Planets In Early Evening And The Ringed Planet In Early Morning"	--	Jack Horkheimer	August 29, 2005
1448	#05-36	"The False Dawn Of Omar Khayyam: What It Is And How To Find It"	--	Jack Horkheimer	September 5, 2005
1449	#05-37	"Weekend Of The Harvest Moon And How To Use The Moon To Find Mars"	--	Jack Horkheimer	September 12, 2005
1450	#05-38	"The Sun During The First Week Of Autumn The Moon Visits Saturn And A Mars Update"	--	Jack Horkheimer	September 19, 2005
1451	#05-39	"The Moon Visits The Goddess Of Love And The Rival Of Mars Plus Mars Becomes Master Of The Eastern Sky"	--	Jack Horkheimer	September 26, 2005
1452	#05-40	"Venus And Mars' Rival Pay Each Other A Very Close Visit"	--	Jack Horkheimer	October 3, 2005
1453	#05-41	"Venus Visits Antares And October's Wonderful Hunter's Moon Visits Mars And The Seven Sisters"	--	Jack Horkheimer	October 10, 2005
1454	#05-42	"Celebrate This Halloween With Mars At Its Brightest Until 2018 Accompanied By The Seven Sisters"	--	Jack Horkheimer	October 17, 2005
1455	#05-43	"Mars Is At Its Biggest, Brightest And Closest This Halloween Weekend"	--	Jack Horkheimer	October 24, 2005
1456	#05-44	"Mars Still At Its Brightest; Mercury, Venus And the Moon; And Saturn Rises Before Midnight"	--	Jack Horkheimer	October 31, 2005
1457	#05-45	"Mars Still At Its Brightest Is Joined By The Moon"	--	Jack Horkheimer	November 7, 2005
1458	#05-46	"Queen Cassiopeia: A Case of Vanity And Its Cosmic Reward"	--	Jack Horkheimer	November 14, 2005
1459	#05-47	"Super Bright Mars And Venus Share The Sky With Three Cosmic Birds For Thanksgiving"	--	Jack Horkheimer	November 21, 2005
1460	#05-48	"Mars Still At Its Brightest; Mercury, Venus And the Moon; And Saturn Rises Before Midnight"	--	Jack Horkheimer	November 28, 2005
1461	#05-49	"The Closest Planet To The Sun Is At Its Best The Second Week Of December"	--	Jack Horkheimer	December 5, 2005
1462	#05-50	"Why Is The Winter Solstice Called The Winter Solstice And What's It All About Anyway?"	--	Jack Horkheimer	December 12, 2005
1463	#05-51	"Four Fabulous Planets For The Holidays"	--	Jack Horkheimer	December 19, 2005
1464	#05-52	"Celebrate New Year's Eve With The New Year's Eve Star"	--	Jack Horkheimer	December 26, 2005
