= Jack Horkheimer: Star Gazer (2007 season) =

- No. of episodes: 53

Release
- Original network: PBS
- Original release: January 1 – December 31, 2007

Season chronology
- ← Previous (2006 season) Next → (2008 season)

The 2007 season of the astronomy TV show Jack Horkheimer: Star Gazer starring Jack Horkheimer started on January 1, 2007. The show's episode numbering scheme changed several times during its run to coincide with major events in the show's history. The official Star Gazer website hosts the complete scripts for each of the shows.

== 2007 season ==
| No. overall | No. in season | Title | Directed by | Written by | Original release date |
|---|---|---|---|---|---|
| 1517 | #07-01 | "Use The Moon To Find The Ringed Planet And The Heart Of Leo The Lion" | -- | Jack Horkheimer | January 1, 2007 |
| 1518 | #07-02 | "Use The Moon To Find The Biggest Planet And An Even Bigger Star" | -- | Jack Horkheimer | January 8, 2007 |
| 1519 | #07-03 | "Which Season Is The Longest? And Which Is Shortest? Spring, Summer, Autumn Or Winter" | -- | Jack Horkheimer | January 15, 2007 |
| 1520 | #07-04 | "Three Pretty Planets For Your Early Evening Pleasure" | -- | Jack Horkheimer | January 22, 2007 |
| 1521 | #07-05 | "How To Find The Most Wonderful "Star" Of Winter Which Isn't A Star At All" | -- | Jack Horkheimer | January 29, 2007 |
| 1522 | #07-06 | "This Week The Ringed Planet Saturn Is At Its Biggest, Brightest And Closest For the Entire Year" | -- | Jack Horkheimer | February 5, 2007 |
| 1523 | #07-07 | "The Goddess Of Love, The Lord Of The Rings, And The Valentine's Day Star" | -- | Jack Horkheimer | February 12, 2007 |
| 1524 | #07-08 | "Some Fun Stuff About Saturn Which Is Still At Its Biggest, Brightest And Almost Closest For The Entire year" | -- | Jack Horkheimer | February 19, 2007 |
| 1525 | #07-09 | "The Wonder And Majesty Of The Four Brightest Stars Of Orion The Hunter" | -- | Jack Horkheimer | February 26, 2007 |
| 1526 | #07-10 | "Three Of My Favorite Stars With Really Nifty Names" | -- | Jack Horkheimer | March 5, 2007 |
| 1527 | #07-11 | "The Moon And Venus Make An Exquisite Showing On The First Night Of Spring Plus A Super Close Pairing Of The Moon And Saturn" | -- | Jack Horkheimer | March 12, 2007 |
| 1528 | #07-12 | "Happy Spring Of The Leaf! And Happy Spring Of The Year" | -- | Jack Horkheimer | March 19, 2007 |
| 1529 | #07-13 | "The King Of The Planets And An Emperor Star Plus The Farthest Full Moon Of The Year" | -- | Jack Horkheimer | March 26, 2007 |
| 1530 | #07-14 | "The Goddess Of Love Visits The Seven Sisters" | -- | Jack Horkheimer | April 2, 2007 |
| 1531 | #07-15 | "The Moon And Venus And The Red Eye Of Taurus The Bull Meet In A Cosmic Triangle" | -- | Jack Horkheimer | April 9, 2007 |
| 1532 | #07-16 | "Celebrate National Astronomy Day This Saturday And Watch The Moon Visit Gemini, Saturn And Leo Next Week" | -- | Jack Horkheimer | April 16, 2007 |
| 1533 | #07-17 | "How To Find Uranus Using Mars As A Finder" | -- | Jack Horkheimer | April 23, 2007 |
| 1534 | #07-18 | "Spring's Royal Sphinx Dominates Early Evening Skies" | -- | Jack Horkheimer | April 30, 2007 |
| 1535 | #07-19 | "The Moon Visits The Two Planets Closest To The Sun" | -- | Jack Horkheimer | May 7, 2007 |
| 1536 | #07-20 | "A Venus/Moon Spectacular This Saturday And The Moon Visits Saturn And Regulus On Tuesday" | -- | Jack Horkheimer | May 14, 2007 |
| 1537 | #07-21 | "A Super Five Planet Parade For Memorial Day Weekend" | -- | Jack Horkheimer | May 21, 2007 |
| 1538 | #07-22 | "A Tale Of Two Planets And Two Stars" | -- | Jack Horkheimer | May 28, 2007 |
| 1539 | #07-23 | "This Week Jupiter Is At Its Closest, Biggest And Brightest For The Entire Year!" | -- | Jack Horkheimer | June 4, 2007 |
| 1540 | #07-24 | "Use The Moon To Find Two Planets And A Star" | -- | Jack Horkheimer | June 11, 2007 |
| 1541 | #07-25 | "Star Gazing On The First Nights Of Summer, 2007" | -- | Jack Horkheimer | June 18, 2007 |
| 1542 | #07-26 | "A Super Close Meeting Of The Goddess Of Love And The Lord Of The Rings This Weekend!" | -- | Jack Horkheimer | June 25, 2007 |
| 1543 | #07-27 | "Three Planets For Independence Week And Our Earth At Aphelion" | -- | Jack Horkheimer | July 2, 2007 |
| 1544 | #07-28 | "The Moon And Saturn, Venus And Regulus: A Cosmic Quad For Your Viewing Delight" | -- | Jack Horkheimer | July 9, 2007 |
| 1545 | #07-29 | "The King Of The Planets Visits My Favorite Summer Star And Constellation" | -- | Jack Horkheimer | July 16, 2007 |
| 1546 | #07-30 | "The Cat On The Scorpion's Tail" | -- | Jack Horkheimer | July 23, 2007 |
| 1547 | #07-31 | "Getting Ready For The Perseid Meteor Shower And Mars' Closest Approach During Christmas Week" | -- | Jack Horkheimer | July 30, 2007 |
| 1548 | #07-32 | "The Night Of St. Lawrence's Tears" | -- | Jack Horkheimer | August 6, 2007 |
| 1549 | #07-33 | "How To Use Sagittarius' Bow And Arrow To Find The Heart Of The Scorpion And The Heart of Our Galaxy" | -- | Jack Horkheimer | August 13, 2007 |
| 1550 | #07-34 | "Don't Miss Next Week's Eclipse Of The Sturgeon Moon The Last Of The Dual Eclipses Of 2007" | -- | Jack Horkheimer | August 20, 2007 |
| 1551 | #07-35 | "Start A Labor Day Tradition With A Giant Cosmic Triangle Overhead" | -- | Jack Horkheimer | August 27, 2007 |
| 1552 | #07-36 | "The Morning Star Reaches Its Greatest Brilliancy And Pairs Up With The Moon This Weekend" | -- | Jack Horkheimer | September 3, 2007 |
| 1553 | #07-37 | "An Alert To Drivers On Next Wednesday's Autumnal Equinox" | -- | Jack Horkheimer | September 10, 2007 |
| 1554 | #07-38 | "The Harvest Moon And Two Fun Things You Can Do With It" | -- | Jack Horkheimer | September 17, 2007 |
| 1555 | #07-39 | "Mars Will Be At Its Closest And Brightest This Christmas! So Start Your Mars Watch Now!" | -- | Jack Horkheimer | September 24, 2007 |
| 1556 | #07-40 | "The Moon Visits An Exquisite Cosmic Trio This Weekend" | -- | Jack Horkheimer | October 1, 2007 |
| 1557 | #07-41 | "The Moon Meets The King Of The Planets And An Emperor Star" | -- | Jack Horkheimer | October 8, 2007 |
| 1558 | #07-42 | "Next Week's Hunter's Moon Is The Closest, Biggest And Brightest Full Moon Of The Year" | -- | Jack Horkheimer | October 15, 2007 |
| 1559 | #07-43 | "Celebrate Halloween With The Seven Sinister Sisters" | -- | Jack Horkheimer | October 22, 2007 |
| 1560 | #07-44 | "The Moon Visits Three Morning Planets And Two Lovely Stars" | -- | Jack Horkheimer | October 29, 2007 |
| 1561 | #07-45 | "How To Look Back In Time Over 2 Million Years Ago" | -- | Jack Horkheimer | November 5, 2007 |
| 1562 | #07-46 | "A Super Easy To Find Constellation: Cassiopeia The Queen" | -- | Jack Horkheimer | November 12, 2007 |
| 1563 | #07-47 | "Three Cosmic Birds For Thanksgiving Week And The Moon Meets Mars" | -- | Jack Horkheimer | November 19, 2007 |
| 1564 | #07-48 | "Mars At Its Closest And Brightest Until 2016 This December!" | -- | Jack Horkheimer | November 26, 2007 |
| 1565 | #07-49 | "Next Week's Geminid / Asteroid Shower Should Be A Real Goodie" | -- | Jack Horkheimer | December 3, 2007 |
| 1566 | #07-50 | "The Moon At Perigee, The Moon At Its Highest, Mars At Its Best And The Winter Solstice" | -- | Jack Horkheimer | December 10, 2007 |
| 1567 | #07-51 | "What Do Santa Claus, The Moon And Mars Have In Common?" | -- | Jack Horkheimer | December 17, 2007 |
| 1568 | #07-52 | "Ring In The New Year With Star Gazer's Special New Year's Eve Star" | -- | Jack Horkheimer | December 24, 2007 |
| 1569 | #07-53 | "The Wonderful Cosmic Red Triangle Of January 2008" | -- | Jack Horkheimer | December 31, 2007 |
