= 11409 Horkheimer =

Themistian asteroid

Discovery
- Discovered by: LONEOS
- Discovery site: Anderson Mesa Stn.
- Discovery date: 19 March 1999

Designations
- Named after: Jack Horkheimer (American science communicator)
- Alternative designations: 1999 FD_{9} · 1988 HY; 1990 RH_{15}
- Minor planet category: main-belt · (outer); Themis

Orbital characteristics
- Epoch 23 March 2018 (JD 2458200.5)
- Uncertainty parameter 0
- Observation arc: 29.11 yr (10,632 d)
- Aphelion: 3.5587 AU
- Perihelion: 2.8167 AU
- Semi-major axis: 3.1877 AU
- Eccentricity: 0.1164
- Orbital period (sidereal): 5.69 yr (2,079 d)
- Mean anomaly: 109.84°
- Mean motion: 0° 10^{m} 23.52^{s} / day
- Inclination: 2.2984°
- Longitude of ascending node: 115.92°
- Argument of perihelion: 74.973°

Physical characteristics
- Mean diameter: 15.355±0.100 km
- Geometric albedo: 0.053±0.005
- Spectral type: C (Themis family)
- Absolute magnitude (H): 12.8

11409 Horkheimer, provisional designation 1999 FD_{9}, is a Themistian asteroid from the outer regions of the asteroid belt, approximately 15 kilometers (9.3 miles) in diameter. It was discovered on 19 March 1999, by astronomers of the Lowell Observatory Near-Earth Object Search at Anderson Mesa Station near Flagstaff, Arizona. The likely C-type asteroid was named for American science communicator Jack Horkheimer.

== Orbit and classification ==
Horkheimer is a core member of the Themis family (602), a very large family of carbonaceous asteroids, named after 24 Themis. It orbits the Sun in the outer asteroid belt at a distance of 2.8–3.6 AU once every 5 years and 8 months (2,079 days; semi-major axis of 3.19 AU). Its orbit has an eccentricity of 0.12 and an inclination of 2° with respect to the ecliptic. The body's observation arc begins with its first observation as 1988 HY at the Leoncito Astronomical Complex in April 1988, or 11 years prior to its official discovery observation at Anderson Mesa.

== Physical characteristics ==
Horkheimer has an absolute magnitude of 12.8. While its spectral type has not been determined, it is likely a carbonaceous C-type asteroid, typical for members of the Themis family. As of 2018, no rotational lightcurve has been obtained from photometric observations. The body's rotation period, pole and shape remain unknown.

=== Diameter and albedo ===
According to the survey carried out by the NEOWISE mission of NASA's Wide-field Infrared Survey Explorer, Horkheimer measures 15.355 kilometers in diameter and its surface has an albedo of 0.053, typical for carbonaceous asteroids.

== Naming ==
This minor planet was named after Jack F. Horkheimer (1938–2010), director of the Planetarium at the former Miami Science Museum, who was the creator and host of the television program Jack Horkheimer: Star Gazer. The official naming citation was published by the Minor Planet Center on 9 January 2001 (M.P.C. 41938).
