= Jack Horkheimer =

American astronomer

- Born: Foley Arthur Horkheimer; June 11, 1938; Randolph, Wisconsin, United States
- Died: August 20, 2010 (aged 72); Miami, Florida, United States
- Education: Purdue University
- Known for: Jack Horkheimer: Star Hustler
- Awards: Asteroid 11409 Horkheimer
- Scientific career
- Fields: Astronomy
- Workplaces: Miami Science Museum

Jack Horkheimer (born Foley Arthur Horkheimer; June 11, 1938 – August 20, 2010) was the executive director of the Miami Space Transit Planetarium in Florida. He was best known for his astronomy show Jack Horkheimer: Star Hustler, which started airing on PBS on November 4, 1976.

== Early life ==
Jack Horkheimer was born in 1938 to a wealthy family in Randolph, Wisconsin, the son of Mary Edmunda (née Foley) and Arthur Philip Horkheimer. His father owned a publishing firm and was the mayor of Randolph for 24 years. Horkheimer started his show business career in 1953 at the age of 15 when he hosted a radio show on WBEV. In 1956, he graduated from Campion Jesuit High School.

During the summers away from college, he travelled the country playing jazz on the piano and organ under the name "Horky". His agents at the Artists Corporation of America ended up giving him the stage name "Jack Foley". He later changed this to "Jack Foley Horkheimer". He graduated from Purdue University with a Bachelor of Science degree in 1963 as a distinguished scholar.

He moved to Miami, Florida, in 1964 for health reasons and began volunteering at the Miami Science Museum planetarium. He later became its director in 1973.

== Career ==
Horkheimer started his astronomy career in 1964, when he was 26, after he moved to Miami and met astronomer Arthur Smith. Smith was the president of the Miami Museum of Science and the chief of the Southern Cross Astronomical Society. Horkheimer started volunteering at the planetarium writing shows and was later offered a position with the museum.

Smith asked Horkheimer to run the Miami Space Transit Planetarium when it opened in 1966. Horkheimer's shows were successful and the planetarium went from losing money to becoming profitable. Horkheimer worked his way up to become the planetarium's educational director and eventually the executive director.

Horkheimer changed the planetarium show from a science lecture to a multimedia event including music, lights and narration. He created the Child of the Universe show for the planetarium in 1972, which became famous and used in other planetariums across the country. Sally Jessy Raphael portrayed the voice of the Solar System in this show while Bill Hindman anchored the principal narration. The show won an international award from the society of European astronomers in 1976. Horkheimer became the executive director of the Miami Museum of Science's Space Transit Planetarium in 1973 and stayed there for 35 years until his retirement in 2008. In 1988, he produced Star of Bethlehem: A Mystery Revealed in which he used computer programs to project three possible dates of planetary conjunctions that the Magi would have recognized as signaling the birth of a great Hebrew King: November 12, 7 BC, April 17, 6 BC or May 8 2 BC.

== Jack Horkheimer: Star Gazer ==
Jack Horkheimer was probably best known for his naked-eye astronomy television show Jack Horkheimer: Star Hustler, which started in 1976 and was broadcast nationally in 1985. Created, produced and written by Horkheimer, the show changed its name to Jack Horkheimer: Star Gazer in 1997 because Internet searches were producing results for the adult magazine Hustler. Over his time on PBS, the show extended to 1708 episodes.

== Media appearances ==
Horkheimer was known nationally for his commentaries about "astronomical events." He was a science commentator for local Miami news station, starting in 1973. A 1982 viewing event for The Jupiter Effect inadvertently resulted in a nighttime riot due to media coverage beyond Horkheimer's control. In 1986, he helped promote an event for viewing Halley's Comet, traveling towards the equator aboard the supersonic airliner Concorde. He appeared on CNN several times, narrating solar eclipses and even hosted shows on Cartoon Network.

== Health issues ==
Horkheimer was born with a congenital degenerative lung disease known as bronchiectasis and, as a result, suffered from chronic pain. His ailment was not diagnosed until he was 18 years old. During this time, he suffered from radiation sickness and lost his hair as the result of medical X-Ray treatments. In 1957, he had to leave the Honolulu Academy of Fine Arts, because it was suspected that he had tuberculosis. His health issues caused him to move to Miami in 1964 for the humid warm climate.

Horkheimer had been close to death on several occasions because of his health issues. As a result, he had prepared a grave site next to his parents. He also had a tombstone prepared and wrote his own epitaph, which reads:

"Keep Looking Up" was my life's admonition;
I can do little else in my present position.

=== Death ===
Horkheimer died at his Florida home on the morning of August 20, 2010 at the age of 72. His death was related to the respiratory ailment from which he had suffered since childhood.

Horkheimer had never been married and did not have any children. His death was confirmed by his niece, Kathy, and Tony Lima, marketing vice-president for the Miami Science Museum, Horkheimer's employer. An email circulated among the museum's staff, stated that they were "very saddened to have just learned that our resident Star Gazer, Jack Horkheimer, passed away today after being ill for quite some time."

Horkheimer's estate was put into probate due to concerns over his later mental well-being and the dating of his will.

== Abuse Allegation ==
In the spring of 2010, Horkheimer was sued by a "John Doe", alleging recalled incidents of past abuse recovered from repressed memories. The case was ultimately dismissed.

== Awards and honors ==
Jack Horkheimer received many awards during his lifetime. These are some of the more major awards and honors he received.

- International Award for Multi-Media from the society of European astronomers (1976)
- Klumpke-Roberts Award presented by the Astronomical Society of the Pacific (2000)
- The main belt asteroid (1999 FD9) was renamed 11409 Horkheimer by the International Astronomical Union (2001)
- 25th Anniversary Classic Telly Award for Star Gazer (2003)
- Silver Medallion Award from the city of Miami
- Pisa Delombo Award for service to scientific education.
- Honorary Doctorate Degree presented by the International Fine Arts College
- 12 Good Men Award from Ronald McDonald House
- Outstanding Contributions Award from the United States House of Representatives
- Outstanding Achievement Award from the Astronomical League

== Publications ==
- Alchemy at Work: The Stars (1985), Audiobook on Cassette, American Chemical Society, OCLC 12539585
- Star of Bethlehem: A Mystery Revealed (1987), VHS video tape, Starlight Telepictures, OCLC 26082294
- Star Hustler Video Almanac (1991), VHS video tape, Community Television Foundation of South Florida, OCLC 30379256
- Tales of the Night Sky: A Video Anthology of Cosmic Short Stories (1991), VHS video tape, Community Television Foundation of South Florida, OCLC 31990680
- Star Hustler Space Oddities (1994), VHS video tape, Community Television Foundation of South Florida, OCLC 32570423
- Make the Stars Your Own: A New Way to Look at the Stars (1998), VHS video tape, Community Television Foundation of South Florida, OCLC 43609056
- Make the Stars Your Own: A New Way to Look at the Stars (2005), DVD video, Community Television Foundation of South Florida, OCLC 317550591
- Stargazing with Jack Horkheimer: Cosmic Comics for the Sky Watcher (2007), book, Cricket Books, ISBN 978-0-8126-7933-5
- Star Gazer Video almanac (2008), DVD video, Community Television Foundation of South Florida, OCLC 496024458

== See also ==
- Patrick Moore (British counterpart)
