= GW 123.4-1.5 =

H I region

Interstellar cloud
- H I region

Observation data: J2000 epoch
- Right ascension: 00^{h} 55^{m}
- Declination: +61° 24′
- Distance: 12,400 ± 3,900 ly (3800±1200 pc)
- Constellation: Cassiopeia

Galactic Worm 123.4-1.5 (GW 123.4-1.5) is an H I region with a mass of approximately 10^{5} M_{Sun}. It has an unusual mushroom-shaped structure that may be the result of having been formed by an infalling cloud slamming through the disc of the Milky Way from the other side. The high-velocity cloud in question is theorized as having hit at around 100 km/s, 5×10^{7} years ago.
