= Ata Sarajedini =

Scientist

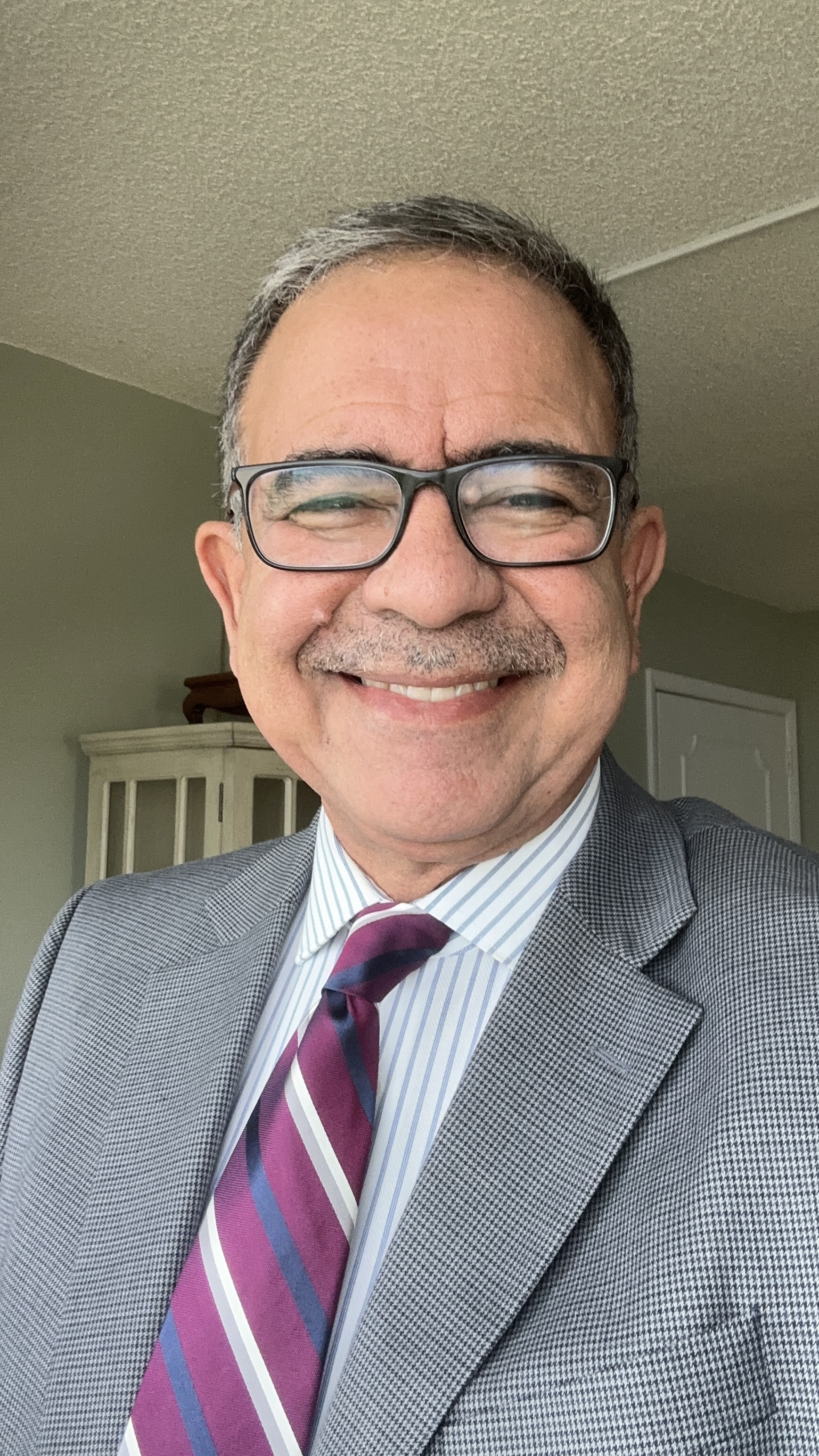
- Occupations: Astrophysicist, astronomer, academic, author, and podcaster

Academic background
- Education: BS., Astronomy and Physics; MS., Astronomy; MPhil., Astronomy; PhD., Astronomy
- Alma mater: Yale College; Yale University

Ata Sarajedini is an American astrophysicist, astronomer, academic, author, and podcaster. He held the Bjorn Lamborn Endowed Chair for four years and is still a Professor in Astrophysics at Florida Atlantic University.

Sarajedini's research focuses on resolved stellar populations in galaxies, pulsating variable stars, globular clusters and open clusters. He has authored and co-authored research articles, one book entitled Astronomy Minute Plus and edited the book, Formation of the Galactic Halo... Inside and Out. He is the recipient of the Kitt Peak National Observatory Postdoctoral Fellowship in 1992, a NASA Hubble Postdoctoral Fellowship in 1995, a National Science Foundation CAREER Award in 2001, the 2006 University of Florida Research Foundation Professor Award, and has been recognized as a Fellow of the American Astronomical Society in 2024.

Sarajedini is a member of the American Astronomical Society, the International Astronomical Union and serves as Scientific Editor for the Journals of the American Astronomical Society.

== Education and early career ==
Sarajedini earned a BS degree in Astronomy and Physics from Yale College in 1986, followed by MS and MPhil degrees from Yale University in 1988. Subsequently, he received a PhD from Yale University in 1992.

== Career ==
In 1999, Sarajedini became an assistant professor at Wesleyan University and subsequently at the University of Florida in 2001, where he was later appointed associate professor in 2003 and Professor in 2008. From 2017 to 2020, he served as the Dean of the Charles E. Schmidt College of Science at the Florida Atlantic University, where he has served as the Bjorn Lamborn Endowed Chair and Professor in Astrophysics since 2020.

Sarajedini became the Associate Chair of the Department of Astronomy at the University of Florida from 2009 to 2011 and later Acting Chair from 2011 to 2012. He was appointed the Dean of the Charles E. Schmidt College of Science at the Florida Atlantic University from 2017 to 2020, since then he has been serving as the Bjorn Lamborn Endowed Chair in Astrophysics.

From 2012 to 2016, Sarajedini served as the Associate Editor-in-Chief of The Astronomical Journal and held the position of chair for the NSF Program Review of the National Optical Infrared Laboratory and the Cycle 29 Hubble Space Telescope Time Allocation Committee in 2021. He has been the Scientific Editor for the Journals of the American Astronomical Society since 2016.

In addition to his research and editorial roles, Sarajedini has contributed to science communication as the Scientific Consultant of the PBS television series Star Gazers since 2018. He also records a podcast called Astronomy Minute on Spotify.

== Research ==
Sarajedini has contributed to the field of astrophysics by studying resolved stellar populations in Local Group galaxies including field stars, open and globular clusters in the Milky Way, M31, M33, the Magellanic Clouds, and various nearby dwarf galaxies, mostly by using the Hubble Space Telescope to gather images and data for analysis.

=== Globular clusters ===
Sarajedini conducted a series of joint studies to understand globular clusters and stellar populations as part of Hubble Space Telescope Treasury Projects. He was the Principal Investigator of a Treasury project, GO-10775, to study the properties of 65 Galactic globular clusters. Subsequently, he was a co-investigator on the Hubble Space Telescope program, GO-13297, employing UV/blue filters to enhance the characterization of multiple population patterns in Galactic Globular Clusters, shedding light on the details of their formation and the origin of their stellar generations, while also offering insights into C, N, O abundance variations and helium enrichment in these stellar systems.

In a joint research effort, Sarajedini examined the characteristics of main-sequence binaries in 59 Galactic globular clusters, showing that, in most clusters, the binary fraction is lower than in the field, with binaries being more centrally concentrated, and an anti-correlation found between the binary fraction and cluster luminosity, among other correlations. Additionally, he observed that low-density Galactic globular clusters exhibit a minimum binary fraction exceeding 6%, with global fractions ranging from 10 to 50%, and a discernible dependence on cluster age, implying an ongoing binary disruption process within the cluster core.

=== Stellar formation and population ===
Sarajedini studied the factors associated with star formation and population in various galaxies. With Andrew C. Layden, he presented deep VI-band photometry of the globular cluster M54, analyzing the age-metallicity relation of the Sagittarius dwarf galaxy with a focus on multiple star formation episodes and confirming M54's age similarity to Galactic globular clusters. He also showcased the detailed characteristics of the M54+ Sagittarius system, revealing old and intermediate-aged star populations with varied metallicities, supporting a closed-box model for Sagittarius' age-metallicity relation. In another collaborative study, he analyzed the population gradients in Local Group dwarf spheroidal galaxies, revealing patterns in Milky Way companions, Tucana, and specific M31 companions, correlating with horizontal-branch morphology and suggesting influences of metallicity and age.

In 2009, Sarajedini collaborated to explore the factors influencing the horizontal branch (HB) morphology in globular clusters, revealing that age, after accounting for metallicity, exhibits a strong correlation with the HB morphology as quantified by the median color difference (Δ(V − I)) between the HB and the red giant branch, suggesting age as the primary second parameter in this context. Alongside colleagues, he identified and characterized multiple stellar populations based on pseudo-two-color diagrams, revealing distinct first (1G) and second-generation (2G) stars with chemical composition differences, and finding an anti-correlation between the fraction of 1G stars and cluster mass. Furthermore, as part of the Panchromatic Hubble Andromeda Treasury program, he investigated about one third of M31's star-forming disk, revealing substantial overdensities in the 10 kpc ring with ages over a billion years, challenging prior assumptions.

== Awards and honors ==
- 1992 – Kitt Peak National Observatory Fellowship, NSF and NOAO
- 1995 – Hubble Postdoctoral Fellowship, NASA
- 2001 – CAREER Award, National Science Foundation
- 2006 – Research Professor Award, University of Florida Research Foundation
- 2024 – Fellow - American Astronomical Society

== Bibliography ==
=== Books ===
- Formation of the Galactic Halo....Inside and Out (1996) ISBN 9781583814284
- Astronomy Minute Plus (2021) ISBN 9781792469602

=== Selected articles ===
- Sarajedini, A., Bedin, L. R., Chaboyer, B., Dotter, A., Siegel, M., Anderson, J., ... & Rosenberg, A. (2007). The ACS survey of galactic globular clusters. I. Overview and clusters without previous Hubble Space Telescope photometry. The Astronomical Journal, 133(4), 1658.
- Dotter, A., Sarajedini, A., Anderson, J., Aparicio, A., Bedin, L. R., Chaboyer, B., ... & Siegel, M. (2009). The ACS survey of galactic globular clusters. IX. Horizontal branch morphology and the second parameter phenomenon. The Astrophysical Journal, 708(1), 698.
- Marin-Franch, A., Aparicio, A., Piotto, G., Rosenberg, A., Chaboyer, B., Sarajedini, A., ... & Reid, I. N. (2009). The ACS Survey of Galactic Globular Clusters. VII.* Relative Ages. The Astrophysical Journal, 694(2), 1498.
- Milone, A. P., Piotto, G., Bedin, L. R., Aparicio, A., Anderson, J., Sarajedini, A., ... & Siegel, M. (2012). The ACS survey of Galactic globular clusters-XII. Photometric binaries along the main sequence. Astronomy & Astrophysics, 540, A16.
- Piotto, G., Milone, A. P., Bedin, L. R., Anderson, J., King, I. R., Marino, A. F., ... & Zoccali, M. (2015). The Hubble Space Telescope UV legacy survey of galactic globular clusters. I. Overview of the project and detection of multiple stellar populations. The Astronomical Journal, 149(3), 91.
- Sarajedini, A. (2023). The properties of RR Lyrae variable stars in the isolated Local Group dwarf galaxy WLM. Monthly Notices of the Royal Astronomical Society, 521(3), 3847–3860.
