= Star Gazers (2023 season) =

- No. of episodes: 52

Release
- Original network: PBS
- Original release: January 2, 2023

Season chronology
- ← Previous (2022 season) Next → (2024 season)

The 2023 season of the American astronomy television show Star Gazers starring Trace Dominguez, which started on January 2, 2023. Episodes of the television series are released on the show's website at the start of the month, up to a month prior to any episode's broadcast date.

The Star Gazers website lists both Trace Dominguez and Ata Sarajedini as hosts. However, Dominguez is the only one of the two who has actually appeared on screen in the Star Gazers episodes.

The 2023 season was the last season for which episode scripts were made available on the show's official website.

== 2023 season ==
No. overall	No. in season	Title	Directed by	Written by	Original release date
2351	#STGZ245	"Astronomy in 2023: What’s Up?"	--	--	January 2, 2023
2352	#STGZ246	"Science of Mars’ Retrograde"	--	--	January 9, 2023
2353	#STGZ247	"Morning Mercury & Antares Jan 2023"	--	--	January 16, 2023
2354	#STGZ248	"How to Find the North Star"	--	--	January 23, 2023
2355	#STGZ249	"Find Zelda’s Giant Winter Rupee"	--	--	January 30, 2023
2356	#STGZ250	"See Venus, The Evening Star"	--	--	February 6, 2023
2357	#STGZ251	"Venus and Jupiter Conjunction"	--	--	February 13, 2023
2358	#STGZ252	"Dogs Chase Rabbits, it’s a Phact"	--	--	February 20, 2023
2359	#STGZ301	"I Eat Green Caterpillars Again"	--	--	February 27, 2023
2360	#STGZ302	"Orion Doesn’t Exist"	--	--	March 6, 2023
2361	#STGZ303	"Spring Equinox 2023!"	--	--	March 13, 2023
2362	#STGZ304	"Three C’s of Spring"	--	--	March 20, 2023
2363	#STGZ305	"Find Two Twins Tonight"	--	--	March 27, 2023
2364	#STGZ306	"Moon Phases: A Refresher"	--	--	April 3, 2023
2365	#STGZ307	"See the Tipsy Moon"	--	--	April 10, 2023
2366	#STGZ308	"Lovely Lyrids for 2023"	--	--	April 17, 2023
2367	#STGZ309	"The Summer Triangle Returns!"	--	--	April 24, 2023
2368	#STGZ310	"What’s That Bright Dot?"	--	--	May 1, 2023
2369	#STGZ311	"Find a Kite in the Night"	--	--	May 8, 2023
2370	#STGZ312	"Go Party Shopping in the Sky"	--	--	May 15, 2023
2371	#STGZ313	"Super Spring Triangle"	--	--	May 22, 2023
2372	#STGZ314	"You Can See Venus Right Now"	--	--	May 29, 2023
2373	#STGZ315	"The Swan in the Sky"	--	--	June 5, 2023
2374	#STGZ316	"Main Star of the Summer Solstice"	--	--	June 12, 2023
2375	#STGZ317	"Many Faces of the Big Dipper"	--	--	June 19, 2023
2376	#STGZ318	"Find the 13th Zodiac in the Sky"	--	--	June 26, 2023
2377	#STGZ319	"Red, White and Blue Stars"	--	--	July 3, 2023
2378	#STGZ320	"You Can Watch the Sky Spin"	--	--	July 10, 2023
2379	#STGZ321	"See the Sagittarius Teapot"	--	--	July 17, 2023
2380	#STGZ322	"The Strangest Names in the Sky"	--	--	July 24, 2023
2381	#STGZ323	"You Don’t Want to Miss These Perseids"	--	--	July 31, 2023
2382	#STGZ324	"Where Constellations Really Come From"	--	--	August 7, 2023
2383	#STGZ325	"Scorpio's Occult Moon"	--	--	August 14, 2023
2384	#STGZ326	"A Super Blue Moon? How?"	--	--	August 21, 2023
2385	#STGZ327	"Jupiter Reverses Around the Moon"	--	--	August 28, 2023
2386	#STGZ328	"It’s a Great Time to See the Pleiades"	--	--	September 4, 2023
2387	#STGZ329	"How to Spot Mercury"	--	--	September 11, 2023
2388	#STGZ330	"An Equestrian Equinox"	--	--	September 18, 2023
2389	#STGZ331	"Pegasus and Andromeda"	--	--	September 25, 2023
2390	#STGZ332	"How to See the “Ring of Fire” Eclipse"	--	--	October 2, 2023
2391	#STGZ333	"Look It’s Leo the Lion!"	--	--	October 9, 2023
2392	#STGZ334	"Hunter’s Moon Conjunction for Halloween"	--	--	October 16, 2023
2393	#STGZ335	"Taurus the Bull Rains Meteors"	--	--	October 23, 2023
2394	#STGZ336	"47 Years of Star Gazing"	--	--	October 30, 2023
2395	#STGZ337	"See a Planet During the Day"	--	--	November 6, 2023
2396	#STGZ338	"Zelda’s Giant Rupee in the Sky"	--	--	November 13, 2023
2397	#STGZ339	"The Moon is Further Than You Think"	--	--	November 20, 2023
2398	#STGZ340	"You Can See Two Star Clusters Right Now"	--	--	November 27, 2023
2399	#STGZ341	"Find Gemini and See Some Meteors"	--	--	December 4, 2023
2400	#STGZ342	"Do Conjunctions Actually Matter?"	--	--	December 11, 2023
2401	#STGZ343	"Two Astronomical Doggos"	--	--	December 18, 2023
2402	#STGZ344	"Celebrate the Birth of JWST!"	--	--	December 25, 2023
