= Price-Whelan 1 =

Star cluster

Observation data (J2000 epoch)
- Right ascension: 11^{h} 55^{m} 12^{s}
- Declination: −29° 23′ 00″
- Distance: 94200 ly (28.9±0.1 kpc)

Physical characteristics
- Mass: 1200 M_{☉}
- Estimated age: 130±6 Myr

Associations
- Constellation: Hydra

Price-Whelan 1 (PW 1) is a young stellar association or disrupting star cluster with low metallicity and extragalactic origin, more specifically the leading arm of the Magellanic gas stream originating in the Magellanic Clouds. Price-Whelan 1 was discovered by Adrian Price-Whelan using Gaia data and additional cluster members were identified using DECam data. The star cluster contains less than a thousand stars. The existence of Price-Whelan 1 suggests that the stream of gas extending from the Magellanic Clouds to our Milky Way is about half as far from the Milky Way as previously thought.

== Structure ==
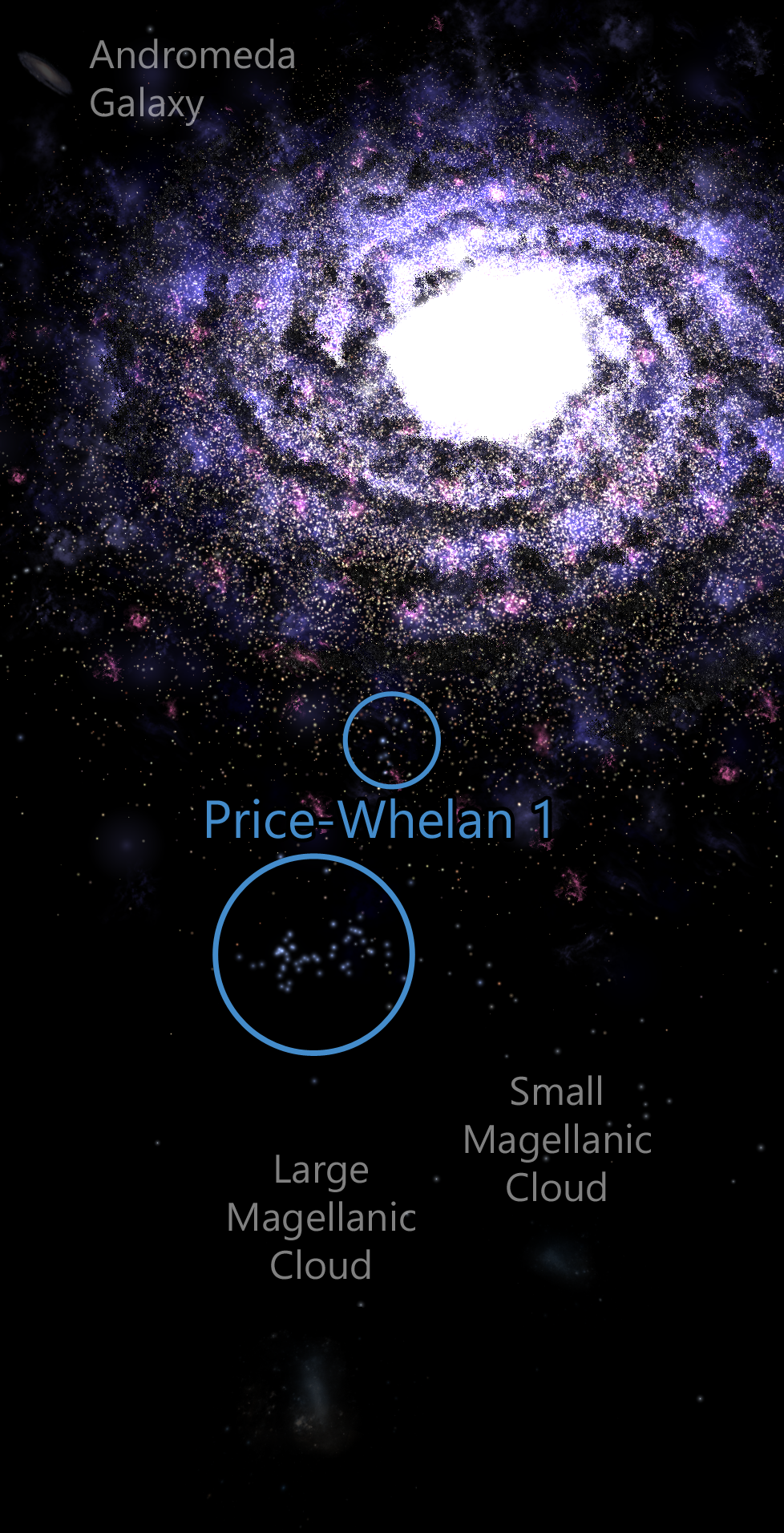
The Milky Way as seen from Price-Whelan 1

The star cluster has larger component 'a' and a smaller component 'b'. The component 'a' was later resolved in two components: an Eastern component 'aE' and a Western component 'aW'. The three components do not only differ in position, but also in stellar content.

== The parent gas cloud of PW 1 ==
Price-Whelan 1 is about ten degrees offset from the leading arm II. This difference is explained with the gas experiencing ram pressure as it passes through the hot gas of the Milky Way halo. The stars will not feel this force. Over time the gas and the stars will decouple, resulting in a different position and velocity for both components. Another possible origin of the star cluster could be the high-velocity cloud HVC 287.5+22.5+240, which has a similar metallicity compared with Price-Whelan 1. This cloud is part of the leading arm and displays a strong magnetic field, which could stabilize the cloud against the ram pressure. The cloud also shows traces of molecular hydrogen, which can also be found in star-forming regions.
