= IRAS 19254−7245 =

Galaxy in the constellation Pavo

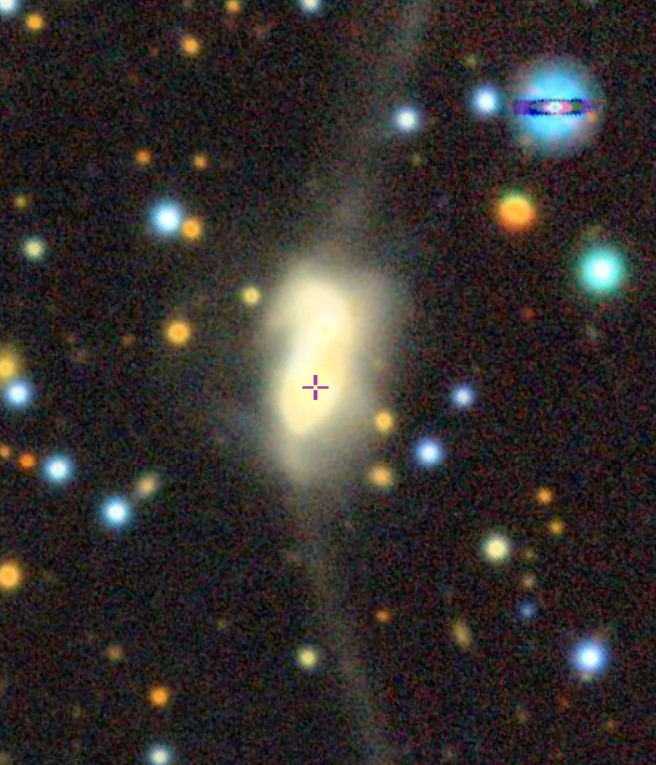
- IRAS 19254–7245 aka the "Superantennae" as seen by DESI Legacy Surveys.

Observation data (J2000 epoch)
- Constellation: Pavo
- Right ascension: 19^{h} 31^{m} 21.40^{s}
- Declination: −72° 39′ 18.0″
- Redshift: 0.061709
- Heliocentric radial velocity: 18,500 km/s
- Distance: 820 Mly (251.41 Mpc)
- Apparent magnitude (V): 0.28
- Apparent magnitude (B): 0.37

Characteristics
- Type: Merger, Sy2
- Notable features: luminous infrared galaxy

Other designations
- AM 1925–0724, IRAS F19254−7245, LEDA 84913, Superantennae, IRAS 19254–7245

IRAS 19254−7245, more commonly referred as the "Superantennae", are a pair of interacting galaxies located in the constellation of Pavo. It is located 820 million light years from Earth. It is an ultraluminous infrared galaxy and a Seyfert galaxy.

== Characteristics ==
IRAS 19254–7245 is classified a galaxy merger. It is made up of two giant gas-rich spiral galaxies with a projected separation of ~ 2 kpc. With a disturbed morphology, the galaxy contains two tidal tails found stretching outwards to a total extend of 350 kiloparsecs (kpc). It is said to represent the nearby galaxy pair, NGC 4038/4039 known as the Antennae Galaxies hence its namesake. However the object is ~ 5 times larger and ~ 10 times more luminous than the pair thus being called the "Superantennae".

The Superantennae also has total molecular gas detection of M_{H2} = 3.0 × 10^{10} M_{sun}. It is optically an Seyfert type II galaxy according to Mirabel and colleagues. ISO mid-infrared spectroscopy did detect a presence of an active galactic nucleus, although there is no clear indications of a dominated energy source.

== Double nucleus ==
The two galaxies in the Superantennae system each have a distinctive nucleus. The northern nucleus appears in a post star formation stage but however less luminous when seen in infrared rays. It shows dynamical components like a broad-line component measuring ~ 2000–2500 km s^{−1} at full width at half maximum (FWHM) connected with the other nucleus, within the galaxy's inner arcmin. Not to mention, the northern nucleus contains high-velocity clouds and narrow components (FWHM < 500 km s^{−1}) associated with its procreator discs.

The southern nucleus of the Superantennae is active when studied at multiple wavelengths. According to observations made by Berta, it shows spectrophotometric characteristics in agreement with young and old stellar populations in the southern nucleus. The two types constitutes ~ 35 and ~ 65 of the mass of the southern galaxy respectively.

Further observations are made on the two nuclei of the Superantennae by Chandra X-ray Observatory. The northern nucleus shows absence of AGN activity. On the other hand, the AGN of the southern nucleus is embedded and is Compton-thick. It has an absorbing column density higher than 10^{24} cm^{−2}. Furthermore, the southern nucleus has a candidate X-ray source located 8" south of it. The off-point source is found to have a 0.3-10 keV luminosity of ~ 6 × 10^{40} ergs^{−1} and is connected with the Superantennae.

== Presence of maser emission ==
The Superantennae is known to show megamaser emission. According to Atacama Large Millimeter Array, an extremely luminous emission line of (6 × 10^{4} L_{Θ}) 183 GHz H_{2}O 3_{1,3} - 2_{2,0}. This is interpreted as H2O emission originating in the maser amplification inside warm and dense molecular gas based on its compact nature (≥200 parsecs).
