= Star Gazers (2026 season) =

US astronomy TV show

- No. of episodes: 39

Release
- Original network: PBS
- Original release: January 5, 2026

Season chronology
- ← Previous (2025 season) Next → (2027 season)

The 2026 season of the American astronomy television show Star Gazers starring Trace Dominguez, which started on January 5, 2026. 2026 is the fifty-first year in which the show had been broadcast since the show's premiere on November 4, 1976. The show's official website lists the 2026 season as being the show's forty-ninth season. Episodes of the television series are released on the show's website at the start of the month, up to a month prior to any episode's broadcast date.

The Star Gazers website lists both Trace Dominguez and Ata Sarajedini as hosts. However, Dominguez is the only one of the two who has actually appeared on screen in the weekly Star Gazers episodes.

== 2026 season ==
No. overall	No. in season	Title	Directed by	Written by	Original release date
2508	#STGZ546	"Welcome To The Night Sky: Star(t) Here!"	--	--	January 5, 2026
2509	#STGZ547	"Stargazing 101: Star Hopping"	--	--	January 12, 2026
2510	#STGZ548	"Find the Gassy Greats!"	--	--	January 19, 2026
2511	#STGZ549	"We Know These Stars Have Planets"	--	--	January 26, 2026
2512	#STGZ550	"Why is the Night Sky Black and not Blue?"	--	--	February 2, 2026
2513	#STGZ551	"Happy 462nd Birthday Galileo!"	--	--	February 9, 2026
2514	#STGZ552	"Let's Go Fly a Kite 2026"	--	--	February 16, 2026
2515	#STGZ601	"Find the Crown, Crow and Crab"	--	--	February 23, 2026
2516	#STGZ602	"Moonlight Pollution?"	--	--	March 2, 2026
2517	#STGZ603	"It's a Sky Menagerie!"	--	--	March 9, 2026
2518	#STGZ604	"There's a Cat in the Sky"	--	--	March 16, 2026
2519	#STGZ605	"One of the First Constellations"	--	--	March 23, 2026
2520	#STGZ606	"The Super Spring Triangle"	--	--	March 30, 2026
2521	#STGZ607	"Virgo Has the Ultimate Green Thumb"	--	--	April 6, 2026
2522	#STGZ608	"Three Boys of Summer in the Sky"	--	--	April 13, 2026
2523	#STGZ609	"Lyrid Meteor Shower and Spring Stars"	--	--	April 20, 2026
2524	#STGZ610	"Why Don't We See the Back Side of the Moon?"	--	--	April 27, 2026
2525	#STGZ611	"Orion's Great Disappearing Act"	--	--	May 4, 2026
2526	#STGZ612	"Zee? Zats the Zenith!"	--	--	May 11, 2026
2527	#STGZ613	"No Luck With Those Swans?"	--	--	May 18, 2026
2528	#STGZ614	"Look at the Tiny Blue Micromoon!"	--	--	May 25, 2026
2529	#STGZ615	"Why is Venus so Bright?"	--	--	June 1, 2026
2530	#STGZ616	"Venus and Jupiter are Almost Touching!"	--	--	June 8, 2026
2531	#STGZ617	"There's a Three Planet Alignment!"	--	--	June 15, 2026
2532	#STGZ618	"The Summer Triangle is Back"	--	--	June 22, 2026
2533	#STGZ619	"Celebrate America’s 250th by Star Gazing"	--	--	June 29, 2026
2534	#STGZ620	"The Hardest Star Names in the Sky"	--	--	July 6, 2026
2535	#STGZ621	"No Such Thing as a Fish"	--	--	July 13, 2026
2536	#STGZ622	"Find the 13th Zodiac"	--	--	July 20, 2026
2537	#STGZ623	"Why Stars Have All These Colors"	--	--	July 27, 2026
2538	#STGZ624	"Total Eclipse of the Euro"	--	--	August 3, 2026
2539	#STGZ625	"The Perseid Meteor Shower"	--	--	August 10, 2026
2540	#STGZ626	"Two False Comets of Scorpio"	--	--	August 17, 2026
2541	#STGZ627	"The Deep Lunar Eclipse of 2026"	--	--	August 24, 2026
2542	#STGZ628	"Meet the Loneliest Star"	--	--	August 31, 2026
2543	#STGZ629	"That's No UFO"	--	--	September 7, 2026
2544	#STGZ630	"Pegasus Flies Over Saturn"	--	--	September 14, 2026
2545	#STGZ631	"Our 49th Autumnal Equinox"	--	--	September 21, 2026
2546	#STGZ632	"Don't Miss Saturn This Week"	--	--	September 28, 2026
