= Star Gazers (2024 season) =

- No. of episodes: 53

Release
- Original network: PBS
- Original release: January 1, 2024

Season chronology
- ← Previous (2023 season) Next → (2025 season)

The 2024 season of the American astronomy television show Star Gazers starring Trace Dominguez, which started on January 1, 2024. Episodes of the television series are released on the show's website at the start of the month, up to a month prior to any episode's broadcast date.

The Star Gazers website lists both Trace Dominguez and Ata Sarajedini as hosts. However, Dominguez is the only one of the two who has actually appeared on screen in the Star Gazers episodes.

== 2024 season ==
No. overall	No. in season	Title	Directed by	Written by	Original release date
2403	#STGZ345	"Best Thing to See in the Sky in 2024"	--	--	January 1, 2024
2404	#STGZ346	"How to Find the North Star"	--	--	January 8, 2024
2405	#STGZ347	"Your New Hobby: Star Hopping"	--	--	January 15, 2024
2406	#STGZ348	"Every Star Has a Personality"	--	--	January 22, 2024
2407	#STGZ349	"Jupiter and the Great Bull of Taurus!"	--	--	January 29, 2024
2408	#STGZ350	"Between the Legs of Orion"	--	--	February 5, 2024
2409	#STGZ351	"Leo Chases Orion and Jupiter Has a Date"	--	--	February 12, 2024
2410	#STGZ352	"Taurus and Gemini"	--	--	February 19, 2024
2411	#STGZ401	"Lepus for Leap Year 2024"	--	--	February 26, 2024
2412	#STGZ402	"Orion and the Pleiades"	--	--	March 4, 2024
2413	#STGZ403	"See the Rare Zodiacal ‘False Dawn’"	--	--	March 11, 2024
2414	#STGZ404	"Lunar Eclipse Tips Libra’s Scales"	--	--	March 18, 2024
2415	#STGZ405	"The Super Spring Triangle 2024"	--	--	March 25, 2024
2416	#STGZ406	"The Great American Solar Eclipse 2024"	--	--	April 1, 2024
2417	#STGZ407	"Two Conjunctions, One Night"	--	--	April 8, 2024
2418	#STGZ408	"Without This Star Astronomers Are Lost"	--	--	April 15, 2024
2419	#STGZ409	"Follow the Arc to Arcturus"	--	--	April 22, 2024
2420	#STGZ410	"The 3 Cs of Spring"	--	--	April 29, 2024
2421	#STGZ411	"From Zero to Hero: Find Hercules"	--	--	May 6, 2024
2422	#STGZ412	"The Drama of Queen Cassiopeia"	--	--	May 13, 2024
2423	#STGZ413	"Ophiuchus: The 13th Zodiac Constellation"	--	--	May 20, 2024
2424	#STGZ414	"Pegasus and the Planets"	--	--	May 27, 2024
2425	#STGZ415	"Summer and it's Stars"	--	--	June 3, 2024
2426	#STGZ416	"Sun Appreciation Day 2024"	--	--	June 10, 2024
2427	#STGZ417	"Saturn In Retrograde"	--	--	June 17, 2024
2428	#STGZ418	"4th Of July Sky 2024"	--	--	June 24, 2024
2429	#STGZ419	"How to Find a Supermassive Black Hole"	--	--	July 1, 2024
2430	#STGZ420	"See All the Inner Planets 2024"	--	--	July 8, 2024
2431	#STGZ421	"Keep an Eye on the Moon"	--	--	July 15, 2024
2432	#STGZ422	"Friendly Moon Smoochies"	--	--	July 22, 2024
2433	#STGZ423	"Spot Sagittarius the Centaur"	--	--	July 29, 2024
2434	#STGZ424	"Good Year for a Big Meteor Shower"	--	--	August 5, 2024
2435	#STGZ425	"See an Exploding Star in 2024"	--	--	August 12, 2024
2436	#STGZ426	"Months of Moon-Planet Meetups"	--	--	August 19, 2024
2437	#STGZ427	"The Goat, the Frog and the Rings of Saturn"	--	--	August 26, 2024
2438	#STGZ428	"It’s a Great Time to Spot Saturn"	--	--	September 2, 2024
2439	#STGZ429	"Partial Lunar Eclipse"	--	--	September 9, 2024
2440	#STGZ430	"Orion’s Planetary Tiara"	--	--	September 16, 2024
2441	#STGZ431	"Here’s How to Find Aquarius"	--	--	September 23, 2024
2442	#STGZ432	"Eclipses Come in Pairs, Did You Know?"	--	--	September 30, 2024
2443	#STGZ433	"Supermoon Conjunction Gumption"	--	--	October 7, 2024
2444	#STGZ434	"There is a Dolphin Constellation?"	--	--	October 14, 2024
2445	#STGZ435	"See Cepheus!"	--	--	October 21, 2024
2446	#STGZ436	"Spooky Secret Stars"	--	--	October 28, 2024
2447	#STGZ437	"The Moon and Venus Meet Saturn"	--	--	November 4, 2024
2448	#STGZ438	"Do You Know All the Names of the Pleiades?"	--	--	November 11, 2024
2449	#STGZ439	"God of War and A Starry Sword"	--	--	November 18, 2024
2450	#STGZ440	"Say ‘Hy’ to the Hyades"	--	--	November 25, 2024
2451	#STGZ441	"Science of Mars’ Retrograde"	--	--	December 2, 2024
2452	#STGZ442	"Find Zelda’s Giant Rupee"	--	--	December 9, 2024
2453	#STGZ443	"Morning Mercury and Evening Venus"	--	--	December 16, 2024
2454	#STGZ444	"The Last Stars of 2024"	--	--	December 23, 2024
2455	#STGZ445	"Sky Events in 2025!"	--	--	December 30, 2024
