= Star Gazers (2022 season) =

- No. of episodes: 52

Release
- Original network: PBS
- Original release: January 3, 2022

Season chronology
- ← Previous (2021 season) Next → (2023 season)

The 2022 season of the astronomy TV show Star Gazers starring Trace Dominguez started on January 3, 2022. Episodes of the television series are released on the show's website at the start of the month, up to a month prior to any episode's broadcast date.

The Star Gazers website lists both Trace Dominguez and Ata Sarajedini as hosts. However, Trace Dominguez is the only one of the two who has actually appeared on screen in the Star Gazers episodes.

== 2022 season ==
No. overall	No. in season	Title	Directed by	Written by	Original release date
2299	#STGZ145	"Happy Perihelion Day 2022!"	--	--	January 3, 2022
2300	#STGZ146	"What Even is Universal Time?"	--	--	January 10, 2022
2301	#STGZ147	"How to Learn the Northern Stars"	--	--	January 17, 2022
2302	#STGZ148	"Astronomy & Astrology are Friends"	--	--	January 24, 2022
2303	#STGZ149	"The Brightest Right Now"	--	--	January 31, 2022
2304	#STGZ150	"Wake Up to Mercury, Mars & Venus"	--	--	February 7, 2022
2305	#STGZ151	"Happy Birthday Galileo"	--	--	February 14, 2022
2306	#STGZ152	"Find Two Dogs in the Sky"	--	--	February 21, 2022
2307	#STGZ201	"The Big Cat in the Sky"	--	--	February 28, 2022
2308	#STGZ202	"Gods of Love & War in the Sky"	--	--	March 7, 2022
2309	#STGZ203	"Stars of the Spring Equinox"	--	--	March 14, 2022
2310	#STGZ204	"Venus, Mars, Saturn & Jupiter Together"	--	--	March 21, 2022
2311	#STGZ205	"What is Earthshine?"	--	--	March 28, 2022
2312	#STGZ206	"Vega, Vega, Vega"	--	--	April 4, 2022
2313	#STGZ207	"How to Easily Find the Ecliptic"	--	--	April 11, 2022
2314	#STGZ208	"Huge Planetary Conjunction"	--	--	April 18, 2022
2315	#STGZ209	"See Eta Aquarids Meteors 2022"	--	--	April 25, 2022
2316	#STGZ210	"Luke at These Tatooine-like Stars!"	--	--	May 2, 2022
2317	#STGZ211	"Total Lunar Eclipse 2022"	--	--	May 9, 2022
2318	#STGZ212	"A Week of Conjunctions 2022"	--	--	May 16, 2022
2319	#STGZ213	"The Strong Man"	--	--	May 23, 2022
2320	#STGZ214	"The Harp and a Triangle"	--	--	May 30, 2022
2321	#STGZ215	"Back to Back Supermoons 2022"	--	--	June 6, 2022
2322	#STGZ216	"Happy 2022 Summer Solstice"	--	--	June 13, 2022
2323	#STGZ217	"Queen Cassiopeia"	--	--	June 20, 2022
2324	#STGZ218	"3 Constellations for the 4th of July"	--	--	June 27, 2022
2325	#STGZ219	"The Greatness of Pegasus"	--	--	July 4, 2022
2326	#STGZ220	"Is it Really Just “The Big Dipper?""	--	--	July 11, 2022
2327	#STGZ221	"See Mars: Land of Robots"	--	--	July 18, 2022
2328	#STGZ222	"Jupiter is in Retrograde (Don’t Fret)"	--	--	July 25, 2022
2329	#STRZ223	"The Moon Really Gets Around"	--	--	August 1, 2022
2330	#STRZ224	"The Best View of Saturn 2022"	--	--	August 8, 2022
2331	#STRZ225	"How Do I Spot Mercury in August 2022?"	--	--	August 15, 2022
2332	#STRZ226	"Find one of the First Constellations"	--	--	August 22, 2022
2333	#STRZ227	"Find Maui’s Fish Hook in the South"	--	--	August 29, 2022
2334	#STGZ228	"Why is the Harvest moon Orange?"	--	--	September 5, 2022
2335	#STGZ229	"Welcome to Autumn 2022"	--	--	September 12, 2022
2336	#STGZ230	"Find a Royal Family in the Sky"	--	--	September 19, 2022
2337	#STGZ231	"Great Time to See Jupiter 2022"	--	--	September 26, 2022
2338	#STGZ232	"Orion and the Pleiades"	--	--	October 3, 2022
2339	#STGZ233	"Ain’t Nothin’ but a Heavenly G, Baby"	--	--	October 10, 2022
2340	#STGZ234	"Find Orion and some Meteors"	--	--	October 17, 2022
2341	#STGZ235	"See a Double Cluster!"	--	--	October 24, 2022
2342	#STGZ236	"God of War and a Starry Sword"	--	--	October 31, 2022
2343	#STGZ237	"Go Look at the Moon"	--	--	November 7, 2022
2344	#STGZ238	"It’s a Great Time to See the Pleiades"	--	--	November 14, 2022
2345	#STGZ239	"Perseus’ Elbow and Medusas’s Eye"	--	--	November 21, 2022
2346	#STGZ240	"Mars Occultation Dec 7, 2022"	--	--	November 28, 2022
2347	#STGZ241	"Best Meteor Shower Dec 14, 2022"	--	--	December 5, 2022
2348	#STGZ242	"Auriga & the Solstice"	--	--	December 12, 2022
2349	#STGZ243	"Christmas Stars Dec 2022"	--	--	December 19, 2022
2350	#STGZ244	"Happy Perihelion Day 2023!"	--	--	December 26, 2022
