= Star Gazers (2025 season) =

US astronomy TV show

- No. of episodes: 52

Release
- Original network: PBS
- Original release: January 6, 2025

Season chronology
- ← Previous (2024 season) Next → (2026 season)

The 2025 season of the American astronomy television show Star Gazers starring Trace Dominguez, which started on January 6, 2025. The 2025 season is the show's fiftieth season. Episodes of the television series are released on the show's website at the start of the month, up to a month prior to any episode's broadcast date.

The Star Gazers website lists both Trace Dominguez and Ata Sarajedini as hosts. However, Dominguez is the only one of the two who has actually appeared on screen in the weekly Star Gazers episodes.

== 2025 season ==
No. overall	No. in season	Title	Directed by	Written by	Original release date
2456	#STGZ446	"A Mars, Venus, Saturn, Moon Meetup!"	--	--	January 6, 2025
2457	#STGZ447	"Vega, Vega, Vega"	--	--	January 13, 2025
2458	#STGZ448	"Jupiter’s Moons Right Now!"	--	--	January 20, 2025
2459	#STGZ449	"Finding the North Star"	--	--	January 27, 2025
2460	#STGZ450	"The Ecliptic Moon Meetups of 2025"	--	--	February 3, 2025
2461	#STGZ451	"We’re Crossing Saturn's Plane"	--	--	February 10, 2025
2462	#STGZ452	"Who Cut Those Crab Claws?"	--	--	February 17, 2025
2463	#STGZ501	"Moons Over My Pleiades"	--	--	February 24, 2025
2464	#STGZ502	"Pi Day to Eclipse Them All"	--	--	March 3, 2025
2465	#STGZ503	"Find That Pi Day Crown in the Stars"	--	--	March 10, 2025
2466	#STGZ504	"Super Spring Triangle"	--	--	March 17, 2025
2467	#STGZ505	"The Real House of the Dragon"	--	--	March 24, 2025
2468	#STGZ506	"Mars, Moon and Gemini Twins"	--	--	March 31, 2025
2469	#STGZ507	"Have a Good Trip, See You Next Fall"	--	--	April 7, 2025
2470	#STGZ508	"Lyra and the Lyric Meteor Shower"	--	--	April 14, 2025
2471	#STGZ509	"Arcturus, Ophiucus, Virgo and Libra"	--	--	April 21, 2025
2472	#STGZ510	"From Zero to Hero: Find Hercules"	--	--	April 28, 2025
2473	#STGZ511	"Pairs on Pairs on Pairs"	--	--	May 5, 2025
2474	#STGZ512	"The Summer Triangle is Back"	--	--	May 12, 2025
2475	#STGZ513	"The Celestial Teapot"	--	--	May 19, 2025
2476	#STGZ514	"How to Find the Milky Way"	--	--	May 26, 2025
2477	#STGZ515	"Hercules' Great Big Cluster"	--	--	June 2, 2025
2478	#STGZ516	"Party With These Stars"	--	--	June 9, 2025
2479	#STGZ517	"Mars and the Drama With Luna"	--	--	June 16, 2025
2480	#STGZ518	"Cepheus The King"	--	--	June 23, 2025
2481	#STGZ519	"Earth at Aphelion?"	--	--	June 30, 2025
2482	#STGZ520	"Perseus’ Elbow and Medusa’s Eye"	--	--	July 7, 2025
2483	#STGZ521	"Astronomy 101"	--	--	July 14, 2025
2484	#STGZ522	"Pegasus and Andromeda"	--	--	July 21, 2025
2485	#STGZ523	"Maui’s Fish Hook"	--	--	July 28, 2025
2486	#STGZ524	"Venus and Jupiter Got The J.U.I.C.E."	--	--	August 4, 2025
2487	#STGZ525	"Taurus and Venus The Morning Star"	--	--	August 11, 2025
2488	#STGZ526	"The Circlet, Saturn and Neptune"	--	--	August 18, 2025
2489	#STGZ527	"Catch Cassiopeia; Hop to It!"	--	--	August 25, 2025
2490	#STGZ528	"How to Binge Watch the Sky"	--	--	September 1, 2025
2491	#STGZ529	"Go See Saturn Now, Today!"	--	--	September 8, 2025
2492	#STGZ530	"NASA is Destroying JUNO"	--	--	September 15, 2025
2493	#STGZ531	"The False Dawn"	--	--	September 22, 2025
2494	#STGZ532	"Three Supermoons?"	--	--	September 29, 2025
2495	#STGZ533	"Orion's Return"	--	--	October 6, 2025
2496	#STGZ534	"How Star Magnitudes Work"	--	--	October 13, 2025
2497	#STGZ535	"Three Men and A Bully"	--	--	October 20, 2025
2498	#STGZ536	"Another Trip Around The Sun?"	--	--	October 27, 2025
2499	#STGZ537	"Supermoon Star Gazing"	--	--	November 3, 2025
2500	#STGZ538	"Leonid Meteors and the Seven Sisters"	--	--	November 10, 2025
2501	#STGZ539	"Find the Winter Triangle"	--	--	November 17, 2025
2502	#STGZ540	"Auriga, Perseus and Taurus"	--	--	November 24, 2025
2503	#STGZ541	"Moons Over My Cetus"	--	--	December 1, 2025
2504	#STGZ542	"The Best Meteor Shower of 2025?"	--	--	December 8, 2025
2505	#STGZ543	"Find the Gigantic Winter Football!"	--	--	December 15, 2025
2506	#STGZ544	"The Five Brightest Things in the Sky"	--	--	December 22, 2025
2507	#STGZ545	"Astronomer Reveals What to Look For in 2026"	--	--	December 29, 2025
