= Magellanic Stream =

HVCld in Sculptor by MClds

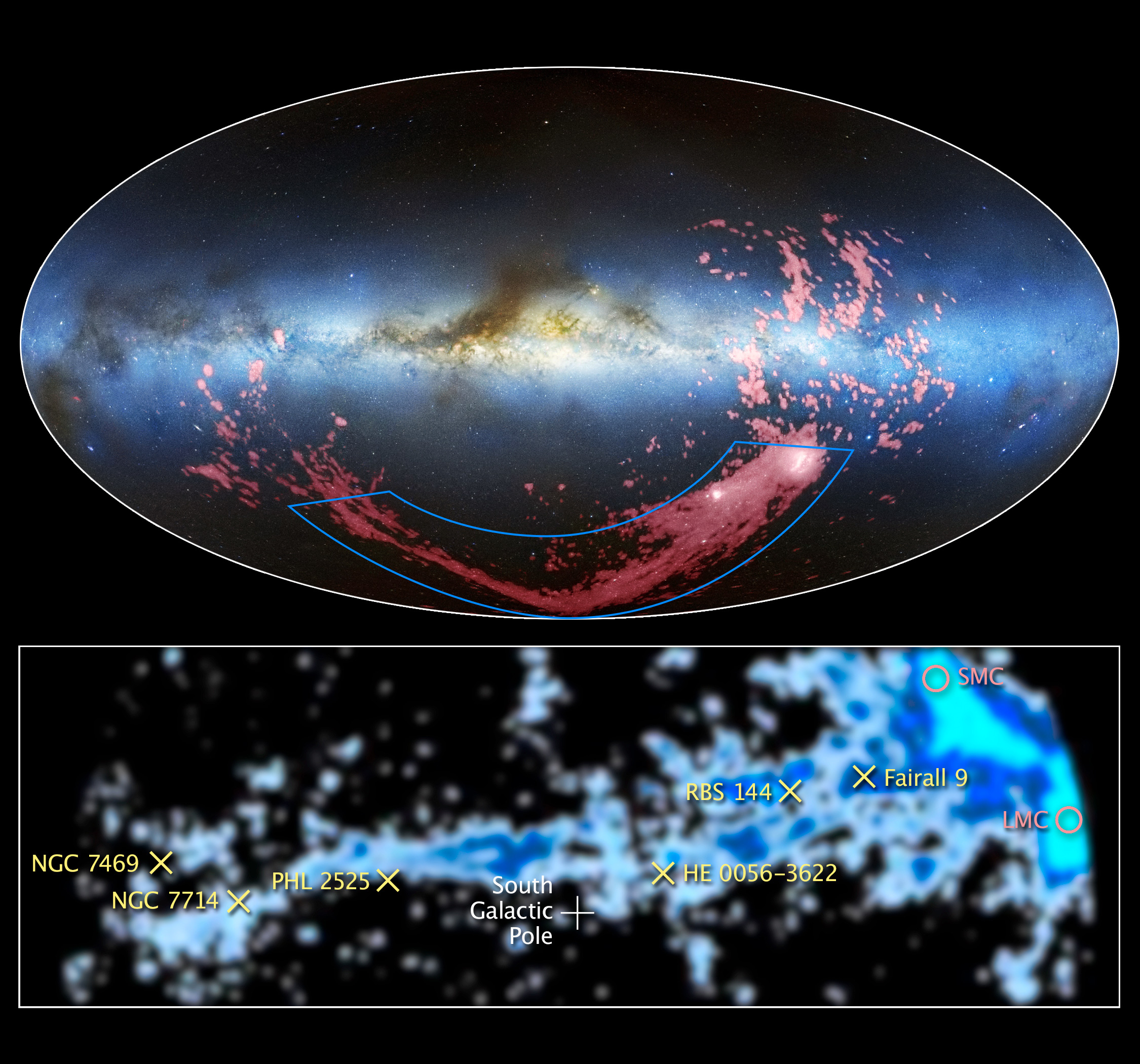
- Map of Hubble observations overlaid on LAB survey, tracing the origin of the Magellanic Stream
- Object type: Intergalactic high-velocity cloud

Observation data (Epoch J2000.0)
- Constellation: Dorado, Mensa, Sculptor
- Right ascension: 00^{h} 32^{m}
- Declination: −30.0°

The Magellanic Stream is a stream of high-velocity clouds of gas extending behind the Large and Small Magellanic Clouds over 100° through the Galactic south pole of the Milky Way. Associated with the stream is the leading arm feature. The stream was sighted in 1965 and its relation to the Magellanic Clouds was established in 1974.

== Discovery and early observations ==
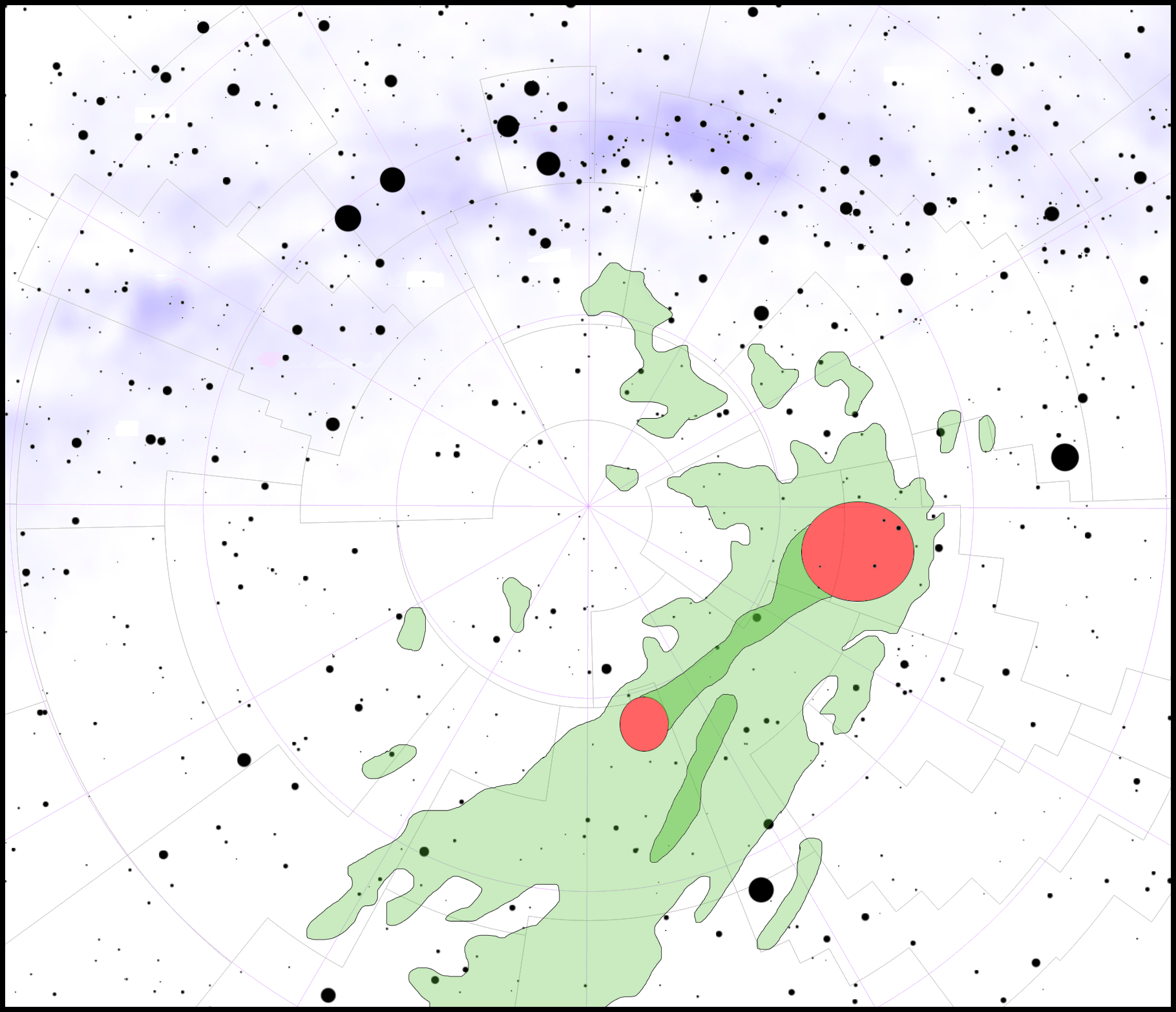
Map of Magellanic stream

In 1965, anomalous velocity gas clouds were found in the region of the Magellanic Clouds. The gas stretches for at least 180 degrees across the sky. This corresponds to 180 kpc (600,000 ly) at an approximate distance of 55 kpc (180,000 ly). The gas is very collimated and polar with respect to the Milky Way. The velocity range is huge (from −400 to 400 km s^{−1} in reference to Local Standard of Rest) and velocity patterns do not follow the rest of the Milky Way. Hence, it was determined to be a classic high-velocity cloud.

However, the gas was not mapped, and the connection to the two Magellanic Clouds was not made. The Magellanic Stream as such was discovered as a Neutral Hydrogen (HI) gas feature near the Magellanic Clouds by Wannier & Wrixon in 1972. Its connection to the Magellanic Clouds was made by Mathewson et al. in 1974.

Owing to the closeness of the Magellanic Clouds and the ability to resolve individual stars and their parallaxes, and proper motion, subsequent observations gave the full 6-dimensional phase space information of both clouds (with very large relative errors for the transverse velocities). This enabled the calculation of the likely past orbit of the Large and the Small Magellanic Cloud in relation to the Milky Way. The calculation necessitated large assumptions, for example, on the shapes and masses of the 3 galaxies, and the nature of dynamical friction between the moving objects. Observations of individual stars revealed details of star formation history.

== Models ==
Models describing the formation of the Magellanic Stream had been produced since 1980. Following computing power, the initial models were very simple, non-self-gravitating, and with few particles. Most models predicted a feature leading the Magellanic Clouds. These early models were 'tidal' models. Just like tides on Earth are induced by the gravity of the 'leading' Moon, the models predicted two directions opposite each other, in which particles are preferentially pulled. However, the predicted features were not observed. This led to a few models that did not require a leading element but which had problems of their own. In 1998 a study analysing the full sky survey made by the HIPASS team at Parkes Observatory generated important new observational data. Putman et al. discovered that a mass of high-velocity clouds leading the Magellanic Clouds was actually fully connected to the Magellanic Clouds in both position and velocity. So, the leading arm feature had its existence finally established. Furthermore, Lu et al. (1998) and Gibson et al. (2000) established the chemical similarity between the streams and Magellanic Clouds.

Newer, increasingly sophisticated models all tested the Leading Arm Feature hypothesis. These models make heavy use of gravity effects through tidal fields. Some models also rely on ram pressure stripping as a shaping mechanism. Most recent models increasingly include drag from the halo of the Milky Way as well as gas dynamics, star formation and chemical evolution. It is thought that the tidal forces mostly affect the Small Magellanic Cloud, since it has lower mass, and is less gravitationally bound. In contrast, ram pressure stripping mostly affects the Large Magellanic Cloud, because it has a larger reservoir of gas. The relative strengths of these stripping mechanisms can be tested chemically and through their dynamics.

== Recent observations ==
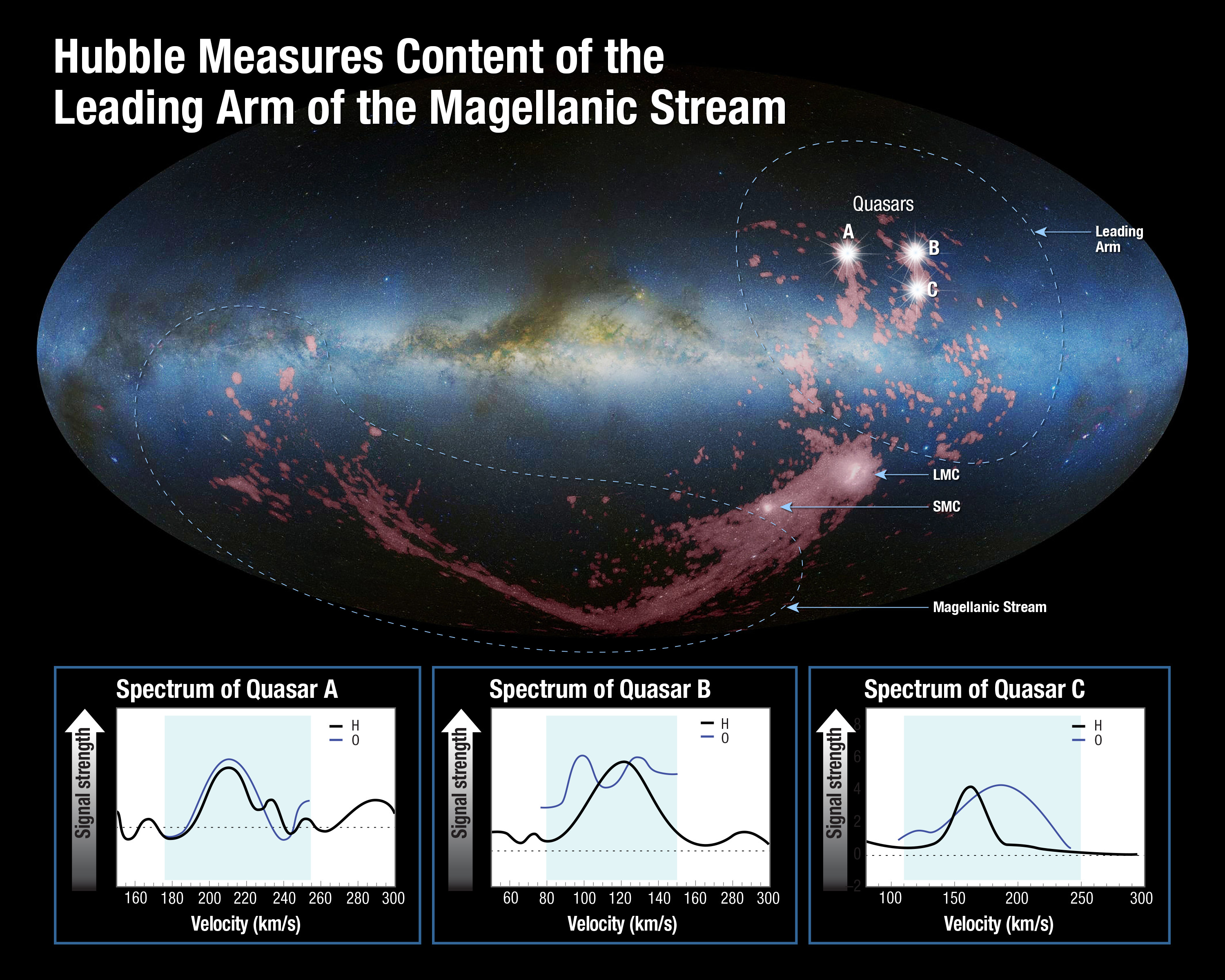
Leading arm of the Magellanic Stream measured by Hubble

At the January 2010 meeting of the American Astronomical Society, David Nidever of the University of Virginia announced new results based on data derived from the National Science Foundation's Robert C. Byrd Green Bank Telescope and earlier radio astronomy observations. The Magellanic Stream is much longer than earlier thought, and is older too. This means that the Magellanic Stream likely formed when the two Magellanic Clouds passed close to each other around 2.5 billion years ago.

In 2018, research confirmed that the chemical composition of the gas in the Magellanic Stream Leading Arm more closely resembles the composition of the Small Magellanic Cloud, rather than the Large Magellanic Cloud, by looking at light from background quasars shining through the Stream and analysing the spectrum of light that is either absorbed by, or let through it. This analysis confirmed that the gas most likely originated from the Small Magellanic Cloud, thereby indicating that the Large Magellanic Cloud is 'winning' in the gravity tug of both Clouds working on the Magellanic Stream.

In 2019 astronomers discovered the young star cluster Price-Whelan 1 using Gaia data. The star cluster has a low metallicity and belongs to the leading arm of the Magellanic Clouds. The discovery of this star cluster suggests that the leading arm of the Magellanic Clouds is 90,000 light-years away from the Milky Way, only half as far from the Milky Way as previously thought. The star cluster is relatively young, which is a sign of recent star formation in the leading arm.

== See also ==
- Interstellar cloud
- List of stellar streams
- Price-Whelan 1
