= H I region =

Interstellar cloud composed of neutral atomic hydrogen

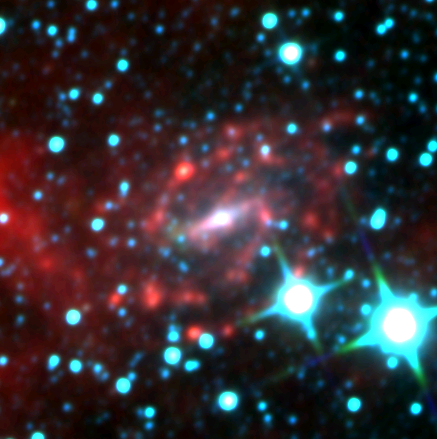
Dwingeloo 1, discovered in 1994 due to its HI emissions

An HI region or H I region (read H one) is a cloud in the interstellar medium composed of neutral atomic hydrogen (HI), in addition to the local abundance of helium and other elements. (H is the chemical symbol for hydrogen, and "I" is the Roman numeral. It is customary in astronomy to use the Roman numeral I for neutral atoms, II for singly-ionized—HII is H^{+} in other sciences—and III for doubly-ionized, e.g. OIII is O^{++}, etc.) These regions do not emit detectable visible light (except in spectral lines from elements other than hydrogen) but are observed by the 21-cm (1,420 MHz) region spectral line. This line has a very low transition probability, so it requires large amounts of hydrogen gas for it to be seen. At ionization fronts, where HI regions collide with expanding ionized gas (such as an H II region), the latter glows brighter than it otherwise would. The degree of ionization in an HI region is very small at around 10^{−4} (i.e. one particle in 10,000). At typical interstellar pressures in galaxies like the Milky Way, HI regions are most stable at temperatures of either below 100 K or above several thousand K; gas between these temperatures heats or cools very quickly to reach one of the stable temperature regimes. Within one of these phases, the gas is usually considered isothermal, except near an expanding H II region. Near an expanding H II region is a dense HI region, separated from the undisturbed HI region by a shock front and from the H II region by an ionization front.

== Mapping ==
Mapping HI emissions with a radio telescope is a technique used for determining the structure of spiral galaxies. It is also used to map gravitational disruptions between galaxies. When two galaxies collide, the material is pulled out in strands, allowing astronomers to determine which way the galaxies are moving.

HI regions effectively absorb photons that are energetic enough to ionize hydrogen, which requires an energy of 13.6 electron volts. They are ubiquitous in the Milky Way galaxy, and the Lockman Hole is one of the few "windows" for clear observations of distant objects at extreme ultraviolet and soft x-ray wavelengths.

== See also ==
- GW 123.4-1.5
