= Adrian Price-Whelan =

American astronomer

- Education: Doctorate degree in astrophysics
- Alma mater: Columbia University and New York University
- Occupation: Astronomer
- Notable work: Mapping dark matter in the Milky Way; Surveys of stars in the Milky Way
- Father: Michael Whelan
- Website: https://adrian.pw/

Adrian Price-Whelan is an American astronomer and researcher who is known for discovering the star cluster Price-Whelan 1. He is the son of Michael Whelan.

== Education ==
Price-Whelan holds a bachelor's degree in physics from New York University and master's and doctoral degrees in astronomy from Columbia University in the city of New York.

== Career ==
Price-Whelan is currently a research scientist at the Center for Computational Astrophysics at the Flatiron Institute in New York. He has expertise in computational analysis, analyzing chemical data for large numbers of stars in the Milky Way and interpretation of kinematics.
