= Star Gazers (2020 season) =

- No. of episodes: 52

Release
- Original network: PBS
- Original release: January 6, 2020

Season chronology
- ← Previous (2019 season) Next → (2021 season)

The 2020 season of the astronomy TV show Star Gazers starring Trace Dominguez started on January 6, 2020. Episodes of the television series are released on the show's website at the start of the month, up to a month prior to any episode's broadcast date.

During this season, extra episodes (described as clips on part of the show's official website) were produced in addition to the regular weekly televised episodes. These episodes tended to be longer than the weekly televised episodes; although, the durations of these episodes tended to vary from clip to clip. While the regular weekly episodes were designed to be presented during a specific week, the content of the extra episodes tended to focus on more general astronomical topics rather than on specific astronomical events which were occurring within a more limited time span, meaning that the extra episodes could be aired at any time during a longer time span. Two of these extra episodes were produced and released in pairs every month, using the same format which had been used for the discontinued five-minute format of the weekly television episodes.

== 2020 season ==
No. overall	No. in season	Title	Directed by	Written by	Original release date
2195	#2020-01	"North Star Orienteering Part 1"	--	--	January 6, 2020
2196	#2020-02	"North Star Orienteering Part 2"	--	--	January 13, 2020
2197	#2020-03	"Finding Orion's Secrets Part 1"	--	--	January 20, 2020
2198	#2020-04	"Finding Orion's Secrets Part 2"	--	--	January 27, 2020
2199	#2020-05	"That'snow Moon!!"	--	--	February 3, 2020
2200	#2020-06	"Orion's Great Love"	--	--	February 10, 2020
2201	#2020-07	"Mercury's Big Show"	--	--	February 17, 2020
2202	#2020-08	"Why Do We Leap?"	--	--	February 24, 2020
2203	#2020-09	"Mercurial Mood?"	--	--	March 2, 2020
2204	#2020-10	"The Moon Is Super!"	--	--	March 9, 2020
2205	#2020-11	"It's Spring! Happy New Year?"	--	--	March 16, 2020
2206	#2020-12	"Welcome To Elongation Station"	--	--	March 23, 2020
2207	#2020-13	"Did Juno You Can See An Asteroid?"	--	--	March 30, 2020
2208	#2020-14	"Morning Astronomy"	--	--	April 6, 2020
2209	#2020-15	"Bump, Arc and Spica!"	--	--	April 13, 2020
2210	#2020-16	"It's Shower Time"	--	--	April 20, 2020
2211	#2020-17	"Betelgeuse, Betelgeuse, Betelgeuse!"	--	--	April 27, 2020
2212	#2020-18	"Another Super Moon"	--	--	May 4, 2020
2213	#2020-19	"Have a Good Trip, See You Next Fall"	--	--	May 11, 2020
2214	#2020-20	"Corvus and Crater"	--	--	May 18, 2020
2215	#2020-21	"Capture the Moon in a Triangle"	--	--	May 25, 2020
2216	#2020-22	"Who Put the Glad in Gladiator?"	--	--	June 1, 2020
2217	#2020-23	"What’s That Bright Dot?"	--	--	June 8, 2020
2218	#2020-24	"Zubeneschamali and Cheese Please"	--	--	June 15, 2020
2219	#2020-25	"Wobble With It"	--	--	June 22, 2020
2220	#2020-26	"An Independent Lunar Eclipse"	--	--	June 29, 2020
2221	#2020-27	"Tidally Locked Moon"	--	--	July 6, 2020
2222	#2020-28	"Jupiter and Saturn: Opposition Edition"	--	--	July 13, 2020
2223	#2020-29	"It's a Planet Party!"	--	--	July 20, 2020
2224	#2020-30	"Maui's Fish Hook: You're Welcome!"	--	--	July 27, 2020
2225	#2020-31	"Green Sturgeon and Vegetables"	--	--	August 3, 2020
2226	#2020-32	"Perseus is in the Shower"	--	--	August 10, 2020
2227	#2020-33	"The Great Square of Pegasus"	--	--	August 17, 2020
2228	#2020-34	"Orion Grabs His Morning Star"	--	--	August 24, 2020
2229	#2020-35	"Ain’t Nothing But a Heavenly G, Baby"	--	--	August 31, 2020
2230	#2020-36	"Fall and Winter Wondersky"	--	--	September 7, 2020
2231	#2020-37	"Finding Andromeda"	--	--	September 14, 2020
2232	#2020-38	"It's Offic-Fall!"	--	--	September 21, 2020
2233	#2020-39	"This Is My Handle, This Is My Spout"	--	--	September 28, 2020
2234	#2020-40	"How Venus Got its Groove Back"	--	--	October 5, 2020
2235	#2020-41	"Follow the Milky Way"	--	--	October 12, 2020
2236	#2020-42	"Captain Planet's Scootchie"	--	--	October 18, 2020
2237	#2020-43	"Medusa's Severed Head"	--	--	October 25, 2020
2238	#2020-44	"Da Disappearing Dipper"	--	--	November 2, 2020
2239	#2020-45	"Look, the Lovely Leonids!"	--	--	November 9, 2020
2240	#2020-46	"Cool Crescent Clumping!"	--	--	November 16, 2020
2241	#2020-47	"Magnificent Moon Maria"	--	--	November 23, 2020
2242	#2020-48	"Zodiac Wowie Zowie!"	--	--	November 30, 2020
2243	#2020-49	"Gee Wiz, Geminids!"	--	--	December 7, 2020
2244	#2020-50	"Red Mars"	--	--	December 14, 2020
2245	#2020-51	"What a Great Conjunction!"	--	--	December 21, 2020
2246	#2020-52	"Happy Perihelion Day!"	--	--	December 28, 2020

== Evergreen Segments ==
No. overall	No. in season	Title	Directed by	Written by	Original release date
3	#EVERGREEN 003	"How to Spot the ISS"	--	--	January 2020
4	#EVERGREEN 004	"Universe Time Machine"	--	--	January 2020
5	#EG005 or EV005	"We Contain Magnitudes"	--	--	February 2020
6	#EG006 or EV006	"Go South, My Friends!"	--	--	February 2020
7	EV007	"Our Strange, Average Sun"	--	--	March 2020
8	EV008	"Exciting Ecliptics Explained"	--	--	March 2020
9	EV009	"Devour Those Showers"	--	--	April 2020
10	EV010	"What Happened To Pluto?"	--	--	April 2020
11	EV011	"Using the Scientific Method in the Sky"	--	--	May 2020
12	EV012	"The Many Faces of Our Moon"	--	--	May 2020
