= Star Gazers (2021 season) =

US astronomy TV show

- No. of episodes: 52

Release
- Original network: PBS
- Original release: January 4, 2021

Season chronology
- ← Previous (2020 season) Next → (2022 season)

The 2021 season of the astronomy TV show Star Gazers starring Trace Dominguez started on January 4, 2021. Episodes of the television series are released on the show's website at the start of the month, up to a month prior to any episode's broadcast date.

Starting with the episode produced for the week of April 5, 2021, the show's official website started listing a new system for production codes for the episodes. For example, the production code for the episode produced for the week of March 29, 2021, was listed as 2021–13; while the production code for the episode produced for the week of April 5, 2021, was listed as STGZ106. However, the website made scripts for these episodes available; and the scripts continued to use the older style production codes. The script of the episode for the week of April 5, 2021, listed the production code as 2021–14.

== 2021 season ==
No. overall	No. in season	Title	Directed by	Written by	Original release date
2247	#2021–01	"What’s Up in 2021?"	--	--	January 4, 2021
2248	#2021–02	"A Tale of Two Clusters"	--	--	January 11, 2021
2249	#2021–03	"Magnificent Mercury"	--	--	January 18, 2021
2250	#2021–04	"Leaping Lepus"	--	--	January 25, 2021
2251	#2021–05	"The Giant Winter Rupee"	--	--	February 1, 2021
2252	#2021–06	"Mars 2020: Perseverance"	--	--	February 8, 2021
2253	#2021–07	"New Moon Albedo"	--	--	February 15, 2021
2254	#2021–08	"Oh My Morning Mercury"	--	--	February 22, 2021
2255	#2021–09	"Orion's Family Reunion"	--	--	March 1, 2021
2256	#2021–10	"Mars is a Cluster Fun!"	--	--	March 8, 2021
2257	#2021–11	"Precession of Equinoxes"	--	--	March 15, 2021
2258	#2021–12	"Finding the Darkness"	--	--	March 22, 2021
2259	#2021–13	"It's a Matter of Degrees"	--	--	March 29, 2021
2260	#2021–14	"Let’s ‘Tri’ This Again"	--	--	April 5, 2021
2261	#2021–15	"Star Gaze with Friends"	--	--	April 12, 2021
2262	#2021–16	"Lyrid Meteor Shower"	--	--	April 19, 2021
2263	#2021–17	"Super Pink Moon"	--	--	April 26, 2021
2264	#2021–18	"Mark Halley's Meteors"	--	--	May 3, 2021
2265	#2021–19	"Great Week For Mercury"	--	--	May 10, 2021
2266	#2021–20	"Total Lunar Eclipse: What You Need to Know"	--	--	May 17, 2021
2267	#2021–21	"A Wild Conjunction Approaches"	--	--	May 24, 2021
2268	#2021–22	"Annular Solar Eclipse 2021"	--	--	May 31, 2021
2269	#2021–23	"Venus, Mars and a Beehive"	--	--	June 7, 2021
2270	#2021–24	"Super Summer Solstice"	--	--	June 14, 2021
2271	#2021–25	"Trick to Find Arcturus & Spica"	--	--	June 21, 2021
2272	#2021–26	"Stars and Sparkles"	--	--	June 28, 2021
2273	#2021–27	"Identified Flying Objects"	--	--	July 5, 2021
2274	#2021–28	"Awesome Altair"	--	--	July 12, 2021
2275	#2021–29	"Observe Saturn on Repeat"	--	--	July 19, 2021
2276	#2021–30	"Binoculars: A Star Gazers BFF"	--	--	July 26, 2021
2277	#2021–31	"Perseid Meteor Shower Next Week"	--	--	August 2, 2021
2278	#2021–32	"How Star Magnitudes Work"	--	--	August 9, 2021
2279	#2021–33	"There are Two Blue Moons"	--	--	August 16, 2021
2280	#2021–34	"Find the Summer Triangle"	--	--	August 23, 2021
2281	#2021–35	"Where the Planets Got Their Names"	--	--	August 30, 2021
2282	#2021–36	"Conjunction Adjunction"	--	--	September 6, 2021
2283	#2021–37	"What is the Fall Equinox?"	--	--	September 13, 2021
2284	#2021–38	"All About Venus"	--	--	September 20, 2021
2285	#2021–39	"Moon Over My Gemini"	--	--	September 27, 2021
2286	#2021–40	"Excellent Draconnids Meteor Shower"	--	--	October 4, 2021
2287	#2021–41	"The End of Gas Giant Retrograde"	--	--	October 11, 2021
2288	#2021–42	"Top Gun Stargazing This Halloween"	--	--	October 18, 2021
2289	#2021–43	"Algol is Evil, Here’s Why"	--	--	October 25, 2021
2290	#2021–44	"November Meteor Shower 2021"	--	--	November 1, 2021
2291	#2021–45	"A Partial Lunar Eclipse is Coming"	--	--	November 8, 2021
2292	#2021–46	"Spot Three Planets Right Now"	--	--	November 15, 2021
2293	#2021–47	"Goodbye Summer, Hello Orion"	--	--	November 22, 2021
2294	#2021–48	"Venus at its Brightest"	--	--	November 29, 2021
2295	#2021–49	"The Geminid Meteor Shower Rocks"	--	--	December 6, 2021
2296	#2021–50	"Happy Yule Solstice 2021"	--	--	December 13, 2021
2297	#2021–51	"Stars for Christmas 2021"	--	--	December 20, 2021
2298	#2021–52	"What’s A Super New Moon?"	--	--	December 27, 2021
