= Charles E. Schmidt College of Science =

College of Florida Atlantic University

The Charles E. Schmidt College of Science is located in Boca Raton, Florida, and is one of the ten academic colleges of Florida Atlantic University. The Schmidt College of Science offers undergraduate and graduate degrees focused on life, physical, and natural sciences. The University's School of Urban and Regional Planning also sits under the College.

== Departments ==
The Charles E. Schmidt College of Science is divided into:

- Biological Sciences
- Chemistry and Biochemistry
- Geosciences
- Mathematical Science
- Physics
- Psychology
- Urban and Regional Planning

== Accreditation ==
The College is fully accredited through the University by the Southern Association of Colleges and Schools Commission on Colleges.
