= High-velocity cloud =

Large collections of gas found in the galactic halo of the Milky Way

High-velocity clouds (HVCs) are large accumulations of gas with an unusually rapid motion relative to their surroundings. They can be found throughout the galactic halo of the Milky Way. Their bulk motions in the local standard of rest have velocities which are measured in excess of 70–90 km s^{−1}. These clouds of gas can be massive in size, some on the order of millions of times the mass of the Sun ($\begin{smallmatrix}M_\odot\end{smallmatrix}$), and cover large portions of the sky. They have been observed in the Milky Way's halo and within other nearby galaxies.

HVCs are important to the understanding of galactic evolution because they account for a large amount of baryonic matter in the galactic halo. In addition, as these clouds fall into the disk of the galaxy, they add material that can form stars in addition to the dilute star forming material already present in the disk. This new material aids in maintaining the star formation rate (SFR) of the galaxy.

The origins of the HVCs are still in question. No one theory explains all of the HVCs in the galaxy. However, it is known that some HVCs are probably spawned by interactions between the Milky Way and satellite galaxies, such as the Large and Small Magellanic Clouds (LMC and SMC, respectively) which produce a well-known complex of HVCs called the Magellanic Stream. Because of the various possible mechanisms that could potentially produce HVCs, there are still many questions surrounding HVCs for researchers to study.

== Observational history ==
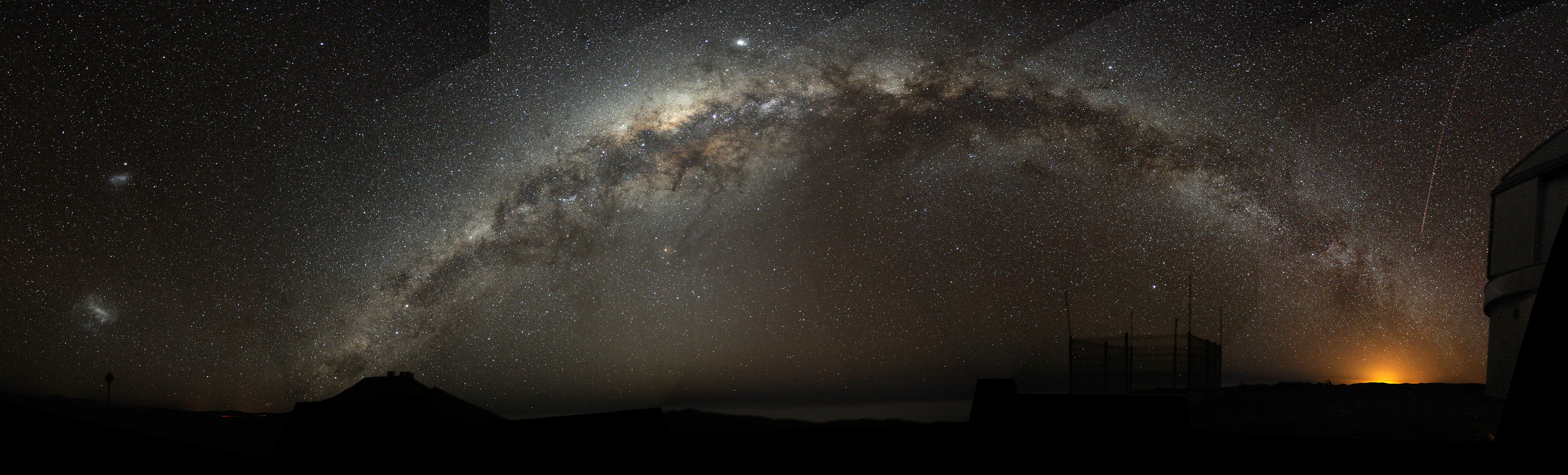
The Milky Way arch emerging from the Cerro Paranal, Chile in December 2009.

In the mid-1950s, dense pockets of gas were first discovered outside of the galactic plane. This was quite notable because the models of the Milky Way showed the density of gas decreasing with distance from the galactic plane, rendering this a striking exception. According to the prevailing galactic models, the dense pockets should have dissipated long ago, making their very existence in the halo quite puzzling. In 1956 the solution was proposed that the dense pockets were stabilized by a hot, gaseous corona that surrounds the Milky Way. Inspired by this proposal, Jan Oort, of Leiden University, Netherlands, proposed that cold gas clouds might be found in the galactic halo, far away from the galactic plane.

They were soon located, in 1963, via their neutral hydrogen radio emission. They were traveling toward the galactic disk at a very high velocity relative to other entities in the galactic disk. The first two clouds that were located were named Complex A and Complex C. Due to their anomalous velocities, these objects were dubbed "high-velocity clouds", distinguishing them from both gas at normal local standard of rest velocities as well as their slower-moving counterparts known as intermediate-velocity clouds (IVCs). Several astronomers proposed hypotheses (which later proved to be inaccurate) regarding the nature of HVCs, but their models were further complicated in the early 1970s by the discovery of the Magellanic Stream, which behaves like a string of HVCs.

In 1988, a northern-sky survey of neutral hydrogen radio emissions was completed using the Dwingeloo radio telescope in the Netherlands. From this survey, astronomers were able to detect more HVCs.

In 1997, a map of the Milky Way's neutral hydrogen was largely complete, again allowing astronomers to detect more HVCs. In the late 1990s, using data from the La Palma Observatory in the Canary Islands, the Hubble Space Telescope, and, later, the Far Ultraviolet Spectroscopic Explorer (FUSE), the distance to an HVC was gauged for the first time. Around the same time, the chemical composition of HVCs was first measured. Additionally, in 2000, a southern hemisphere survey of neutral hydrogen radio emissions was completed using the Villa Elisa radio telescope in Argentina from which yet more HVCs were discovered.

Later observations of Complex C showed that the cloud, originally thought to be deficient in heavy elements (also known as low metallicity), contains some sections with a higher metallicity compared to the bulk of the cloud, indicating that it has begun to mix with other gas in the halo. Using observations of highly ionized oxygen and other ions astronomers were able to show that hot gas in Complex C is an interface between hot and cold gas.

== Characteristics ==
=== Multi-phase structure ===
HVCs are typically the coldest and densest components of the galactic halo. However, the halo itself also has a multi-phase structure: cold and dense neutral hydrogen at temperatures less than 10^{4} K, warm and warm-hot gas at temperatures between 10^{4} K and 10^{6} K, and hot ionized gas at temperatures greater than 10^{6} K. As a result, cool clouds moving through the diffuse halo medium have a chance to become ionized by the warmer and hotter gas. This can create a pocket of ionized gas that surrounds a neutral interior in an HVC. Evidence of this cool-hot gas interaction in the halo comes from the observation of OVI absorption.

=== Distance ===
HVCs are defined by their respective velocities, but distance measurements allow for estimates on their size, mass, volume density, and even pressure. In the Milky Way, clouds are typically located between 2–15 kpc (6.52×10^{3} ly–4.89×10^{4} ly) from the centre, and at z-heights (distances above or below the Galactic plane) within 10 kpc (3.26×10^{4} ly). The Magellanic Stream and the Leading Arm are at ~55 kpc (1.79×10^{5} ly), near the Magellanic Clouds, and may extend to about 100–150 kpc (3.26×10^{5} ly–4.89×10^{5} ly). There are two methods of distance determination for HVCs.

==== Direct-distance constraint ====
The best method for determining the distance to an HVC involves using a halo star of known distance as a standard for comparison. We can extract information about the distance by studying the star's spectrum. If a cloud is located in front of the halo star, absorption lines will be present, whereas if the cloud is behind the star, no absorption lines should be present. CaII, H, K, and/or NaII are the double absorption lines that are used in this technique. Halo stars that have been identified through the Sloan Digital Sky Survey have led to distance measurements for almost all of the large complexes currently known.

==== Indirect-distance constraint ====
The indirect-distance-constraint methods are usually dependent on theoretical models, and assumptions must be made in order for them to work. One indirect method involves Hα observations, where an assumption is made that the emission lines come from ionizing radiation from the galaxy, reaching the cloud's surface. Another method uses deep HI observations in the Milky Way and/or Local Group with the assumption that the distribution of HVCs in the Local Group is similar to that of the Milky Way. These observations put the clouds within 80 kpc (2.61×10^{5} ly) of the galaxy, and observations of the Andromeda Galaxy put them at approximately 50 kpc (1.63×10^{5} ly). For those HVCs where both are available, distances measured via Hα emission tend to agree with those found via direct distances measurements.

=== Spectral features ===
HVCs are typically detected at the radio and optical wavelengths, and for hotter HVCs, ultraviolet and/or X-ray observations are needed. Neutral hydrogen clouds are detected via the 21 cm emission line. Observations have shown that HVCs can have ionized exteriors due to external radiation or the motion of the HVC through a diffuse halo medium. These ionized components can be detected through Hα emission lines and even absorption lines in the ultraviolet. The warm-hot gas in HVCs exhibit OVI, SiIV, and CIV absorption lines.

=== Temperature ===
Most HVCs show spectral line widths that are indicative of a warm, neutral medium for HVCs at about 9000 Kelvin. However, many HVCs have line widths which indicate that they are also partly composed of cool gas at less than 500 K.

=== Mass ===
Estimates on the peak column density of HVCs (10^{19} cm^{−2}) and typical distances (1–15 kpc) yield a mass estimate of HVCs in the Milky Way in the range of 7.4×10^{7} $\begin{smallmatrix}M_\odot\end{smallmatrix}$. If the Large Magellanic Cloud and the Small Magellanic Cloud are included, the total mass would increase by another 7×10^{8} $\begin{smallmatrix}M_\odot\end{smallmatrix}$.

=== Size ===
Observed angular sizes for HVCs range from 10^{3} degrees^{2} down to the resolution limit of the observations. Typically, high resolution observations eventually show that larger HVCs are often composed of many smaller complexes. When detecting HVCs solely via HI emission, all of the HVCs in the Milky Way cover about 37% of the night sky. Most HVCs are somewhere between 2 and 15 kilo parsecs (kpc) across.

== Lifetimes ==
Cold clouds moving through a diffuse halo medium are estimated to have a survival time on the order of a couple hundred million years without some sort of support mechanism that prevents them from dissipating. The lifetime mainly depends on the mass of the cloud, but also on the cloud density, halo density, and velocity of the cloud. HVCs in the galactic halo are destroyed through what is called the Kelvin-Helmholtz instability. The infall of clouds can dissipate energy leading to the inevitable heating of the halo medium. The multi-phase structure of the gaseous halo suggests that there is an ongoing life-cycle of HVC destruction and cooling.

=== Possible support mechanisms ===
Some possible mechanisms responsible for increasing the lifetime of an HVC include the presence of a magnetic field that induces a shielding effect and/or the presence of dark matter; however, there is no strong observational evidence for dark matter in HVCs. The most accepted mechanism is that of dynamical shielding, which increases the Kelvin-Helmholtz time. This process works due to the HVC having a cold neutral interior shielded by a warmer and lower-density exterior, causing the HI clouds to have smaller relative velocities with respect to their surroundings.

== Origins ==
Since their discovery, several possible models have been proposed to explain the origins of HVCs. However, for observations in the Milky Way, the multiplicity of clouds, the distinct characteristics of IVCs, and the existence of clouds that are clearly associated with cannibalized dwarf galaxies (i.e. the Magellanic system among others) indicate that the HVCs most likely have several possible origins. This conclusion is also strongly supported by the fact that most simulations for any given model can account for some cloud behaviors, but not all.

=== Oort's hypothesis ===
Jan Oort developed a model to explain HVCs as gas left over from the early formation of the galaxy. He theorized that if this gas were at the edge of the galaxy's gravitational influence, over billions of years it could be dragged back toward the Galactic disk and fall back in as HVCs. Oort's model explained the observed chemical composition of the galaxy well. Given an isolated galaxy (i.e. one without ongoing assimilation of hydrogen gas), successive generations of stars should infuse the Interstellar Medium (ISM) with higher abundances of heavy elements. However, examinations of stars in the solar neighborhood show roughly the same relative abundances of the same elements regardless of the age of the star; this has come to be known as the G dwarf problem. HVCs may explain these observations by representing a portion of the primordial gas responsible for continuously diluting the ISM.

=== Galactic fountain ===
An alternative theory centers on gas being ejected out of the galaxy and falling back in as the high-velocity gas we observe. Several proposed mechanisms exist to explain how material can be ejected from the Galactic disk, but the most prevalent explanation of the Galactic Fountain centers on compounding supernova explosions to eject large "bubbles" of material. Since gas is being ejected from the disk of the galaxy, the observed metallicity of the ejected gas should be similar to that of the disk. While this may be ruled out for the source of HVCs, these conclusions may point to the Galactic Fountain as the source of IVCs.

=== Accretion from satellite galaxies ===
As dwarf galaxies pass through a larger galaxy's halo, the gas that exists as the interstellar medium of the dwarf galaxy may be stripped away by tidal forces and ram pressure stripping. Evidence for this model of HVC formation comes from observations of the Magellanic Stream in the halo of the Milky Way. The somewhat distinct features of HVCs formed in this way are also accounted for by simulations, and most HVCs in the Milky Way which are not associated with the Magellanic Stream do not seem to be at all associated with a dwarf galaxy.

=== Dark matter ===
Another model, proposed by David Eichler, now at Ben Gurion University, and later by Leo Blitz of the University of California at Berkeley, assumes the clouds are very massive, located between galaxies, and created when baryonic material pools near concentrations of dark matter. The gravitational attraction between the dark matter and the gas was intended to explain the ability of the clouds to remain stable even at intergalactic distances where the paucity of ambient material should cause the clouds to dissipate rather quickly. However, with the advent of distance determinations for most HVCs, this possibility may be ruled out.

== Galactic evolution ==
To inquire into the origin and fate of a galaxy's halo gas is to inquire into the evolution of said galaxy. HVCs and IVCs are significant features of a spiral galaxy's structure. These clouds are of primary importance when considering a galaxy's Star formation rate (SFR). The Milky Way has approximately 5 billion solar masses of star forming material within its disk and a SFR of 1–3 $\begin{smallmatrix}M_\odot\end{smallmatrix}$ yr^{−1}. Models for galactic chemical evolution find that at least half of this amount must be continuously accreted, low-metallicity material to describe the current, observable structure. Without this accretion, the SFRs indicate that the current star formation material will only last for another few gigayears (Gyr) at most.

Models of mass inflow place a maximal accretion rate of .4 $\begin{smallmatrix}M_\odot\end{smallmatrix}$ yr^{−1} from HVCs. This rate does not meet that which is demanded by the chemical evolutionary models. Thus, it is a possibility that the Milky Way may go through a low point in gas content and/or decrease its SFR until further gas arrives. Consequently, when discussing HVCs in the context of galactic evolution, the conversation is largely concerned with star formation and how the future star material fuels the galactic disk.

The current model for the universe, ɅCDM, indicates that galaxies tend to cluster and achieve a web-like structure over time. Under such models, the large majority of baryons entering a galactic halo do so along these cosmic filaments. 70% of the mass inflow at the virial radius is consistent with coming in along cosmic filaments in evolutionary models of the Milky Way. Given current observational limitations, the majority of the filaments feeding into the Milky Way are not visible in HI. Despite this, some gas clouds within the Galaxy's halo have lower metallicities than that of gas stripped from satellites, suggesting that the clouds are primordial material probably flowing in along the cosmic filaments. Gas of this type, detectable out to ~160,000 ly (50 kpc), largely becomes part of the hot halo, cools and condenses, and falls into the Galactic disk to serve in star formation.

Mechanical feedback mechanisms, supernova-driven or active galactic nuclei-driven outflows of gas, are also key elements in understanding the origin of a spiral galaxy's halo gas and the HVCs within. X-ray and gamma-ray observations in the Milky Way indicate the likelihood of some central engine feedback having occurred in the past 10–15 megayears (Myr). Furthermore, as described in “origins,” the disk-wide “galactic fountain” phenomenon is similarly crucial in piecing together the Milky Way's evolution. Materials ejected in the course of a galaxy's lifetime help describe observational data (observed metallicity content primarily) while providing feedback sources for future star formation.

Likewise detailed in the "origins" section, satellite accretion plays a role in the evolution of a galaxy. Most galaxies are assumed to result from smaller precursors merging, and the process continues throughout a galaxy's lifetime. Within the next 10 billion years, further satellite galaxies will merge with Milky Way, sure to significantly impact the Milky Way's structure and steer its future evolution.

Spiral galaxies have abundant sources for potential star-formation material, but how long galaxies are able to continuously draw on these resources remains in question. A future generation of observational tools and computational abilities will shed light on some of the technical details of the Milky Way's past and future as well as how HVCs play a role in its evolution.

== Examples of HVCs ==
=== Northern Hemisphere ===
In the Northern Hemisphere, we find several large HVCs, though nothing on the order of the Magellanic system (discussed below). Complexes A and C were the first HVCs discovered and were first observed in 1963. Both of these clouds have been found to be deficient in heavy elements, showing a concentration that is 10–30% that of the Sun's. Their low metallicity seems to serve as proof that HVCs do indeed bring in “fresh” gas. Complex C has been estimated to bring in 0.1–0.2 $\begin{smallmatrix}M_\odot\end{smallmatrix}$ of new material every year, whereas Complex A brings in about half that amount. This fresh gas is about 10–20% of the total needed to properly dilute Galactic gas enough to account for the chemical composition of stars.

==== Complex C ====
Complex C, one of the most well-studied HVCs, is at least 14,000 ly (about 4 kpc) distant but no more than 45,000 ly (about 14 kpc) above the Galactic plane. It should also be noted that Complex C has been observed to have about 1/50 of the nitrogen content that the Sun contains. Observations of high-mass stars indicate that they produce less nitrogen, as compared to other heavy elements, than do low-mass stars. This implies that the heavy elements in Complex C may come from high-mass stars. The earliest stars are known to have been higher-mass stars and so Complex C appears to be a fossil of sorts, formed outside the galaxy and made up of gas from the ancient universe. However, a more recent study of another area of Complex C has found a metallicity twice as high as what was reported originally. These measurements have led scientists to believe that Complex C has begun to mix with other, younger, nearby gas clouds.

==== Complex A ====
Complex A is located 25,000–30,000 ly (8–9 kpc) away in the galactic halo.

=== Southern Hemisphere ===
In the Southern Hemisphere, the most prominent HVCs are all associated with the Magellanic system which has two major components, the Magellanic Stream and the Leading Arm. They are both made of gas that was stripped from the Large and Small Magellanic Clouds (LMC and SMC). Half of the gas was decelerated and now lags behind the clouds in their orbits (this is the stream component). The other half of the gas (the leading arm component) was accelerated and pulled out in front of the galaxies in their orbit. The Magellanic system is about 180,000 ly (55 kpc) from the Galactic disk, though the tip of the Magellanic Stream may extend out as far as 300,000–500,000 ly (100–150 kpc). The entire system is thought to contribute at least 3×10^{8}$\begin{smallmatrix}M_\odot\end{smallmatrix}$ of HI to the Galactic halo, about 30–50% of the HI mass of the Milky Way.

==== Magellanic Stream ====
The Magellanic Stream is seen as a “long, continuous structure with a well-defined velocity and column density gradient.” The velocity at the tip of the Magellanic Stream is hypothesized to be +300 km/s in the Galactic-standard-of-rest (GSR) frame. Stream clouds are thought to have a lower pressure than other HVCs because they reside in an area where the Galactic halo medium is more distant and has a much lower density. FUSE found highly ionized oxygen mixed in with the Magellanic Stream. This suggests that the stream must be embedded in hot gas.

==== Leading Arm ====
The Leading Arm is not one continuous stream, but rather an association of multiple clouds found in the region preceding the Magellanic Clouds. It is thought to have a velocity of −300 km/s in the GSR frame. One of the HVCs in the Leading Arm shows a composition very similar to the SMC. This seems to support the idea that the gas that comprises it was pulled off of the galaxy and accelerated in front of it via tidal forces which pull apart satellite galaxies and assimilate them into the Milky Way.

==== Smith's Cloud ====
Smith's Cloud is another well-studied HVC found in the Southern Hemisphere, located in the constellation Aquila.

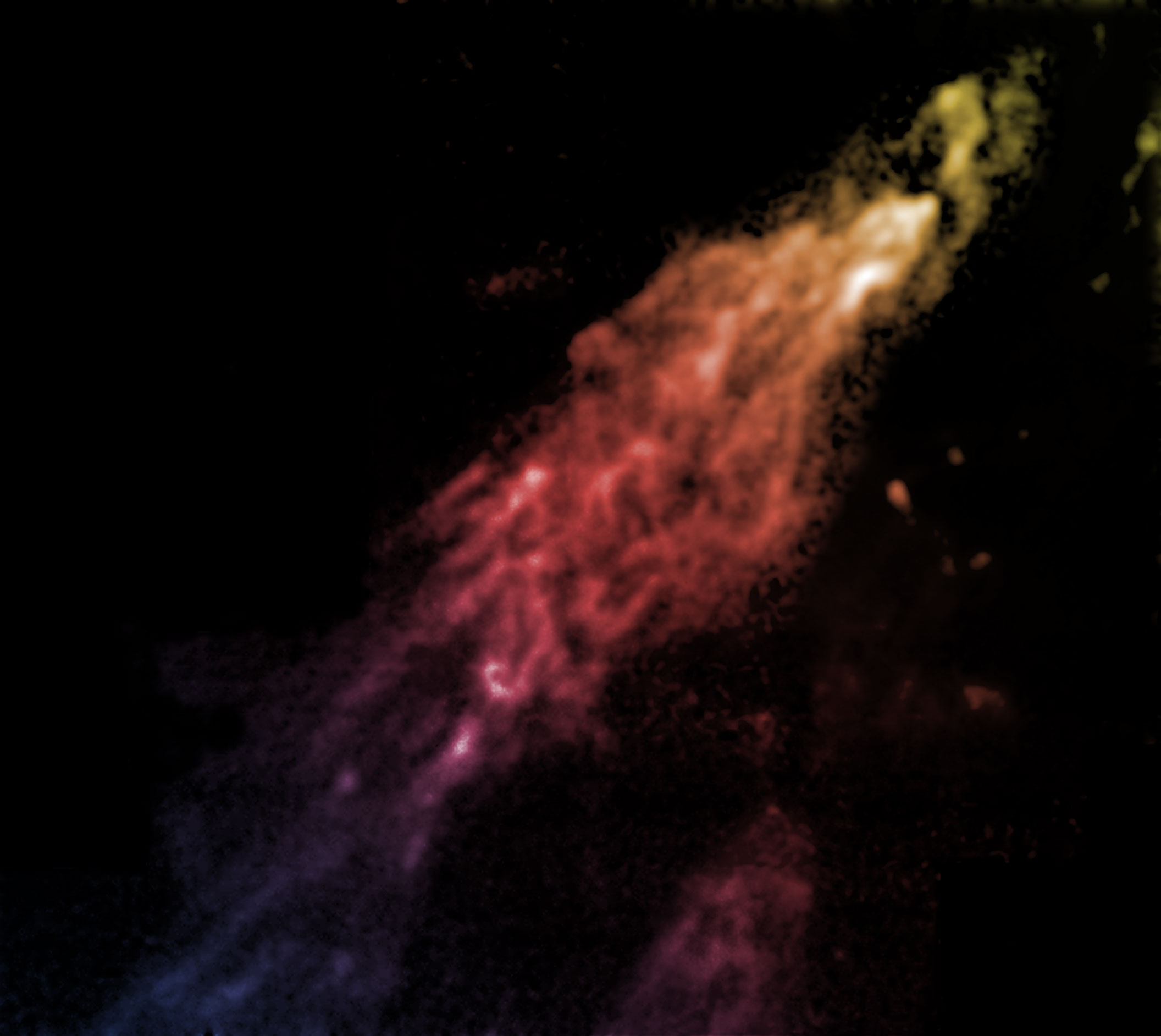
An image of Smith's Cloud, taken in 2008 by the Green Bank Telescope

== See also ==
- Interstellar cloud
- Nebula
