= Interstellar cloud =

Accumulation of gas, plasma, and dust in space

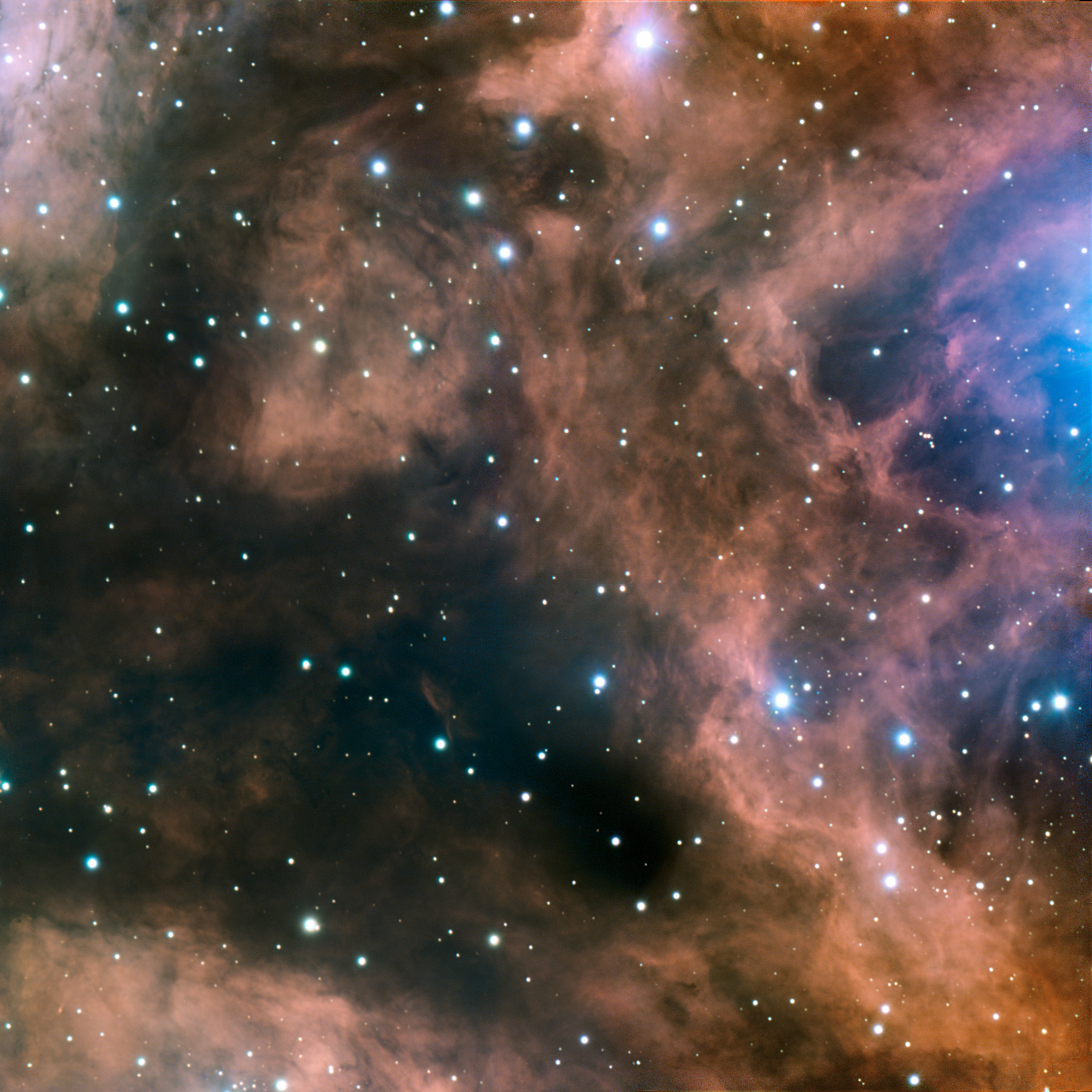
A small part of the emission nebula NGC 6357. It glows with the characteristic red of an H II region.

An interstellar cloud is an accumulation of gas, plasma, and cosmic dust in galaxies. Put differently, an interstellar cloud is a denser-than-average region of the interstellar medium, the matter and radiation that exists in the space between the star systems in a galaxy. Depending on the density, size, and temperature of a given cloud, its hydrogen can be neutral, making an H I region; ionized, or plasma making it an H II region; or molecular, which are referred to simply as molecular clouds, or sometime dense clouds. Neutral and ionized clouds are sometimes also called diffuse clouds. An interstellar cloud is formed by the gas and dust particles from a red giant in its later life.

== Chemical compositions ==
The chemical composition of interstellar clouds is determined by studying electromagnetic radiation that they emanate, and we receive – from radio waves through visible light, across the electromagnetic spectrum to gamma rays. Large radio telescopes scan the intensity in the sky of particular frequencies of electromagnetic radiation, which are characteristic of certain molecules' spectra. Some interstellar clouds are cold and tend to give out electromagnetic radiation of large wavelengths. A map of the abundance of these molecules can be made, enabling an understanding of the varying composition of the clouds. In hot clouds, there are often ions of many elements, whose spectra can be seen in visible and ultraviolet light.

Radio telescopes can also scan over the frequencies from one point in the map, recording the intensities of each type of molecule. Peaks of frequencies mean that an abundance of that molecule or atom is present in the cloud. The height of the peak is proportional to the relative percentage that it makes up.

=== Unexpected chemicals detected in interstellar clouds ===
View inside the Lagoon Nebula.

Before 2001, the rates of reactions in interstellar clouds were expected to be very slow, with minimal products being produced due to the low temperature and density of the clouds. However, organic molecules were observed in the spectra that scientists would not have expected to find under these conditions, such as formaldehyde, methanol, and vinyl alcohol. The chemical reactions needed to create such substances are familiar to scientists only at the much higher temperatures and pressures of earth and earth-based laboratories. The fact that they were found indicates that these reactions in interstellar clouds take place faster than suspected, likely in gas-phase reactions unfamiliar to organic chemistry as observed on earth. These reactions are studied in the CRESU experiment.

Interstellar clouds also provide a medium to study the presence and proportions of metals in space. The presence and ratios of these elements may help develop theories on the means of their production, especially when their proportions are inconsistent with those expected to arise from stars as a result of fusion and thereby suggest alternate means, such as cosmic ray spallation.

== High-velocity cloud ==
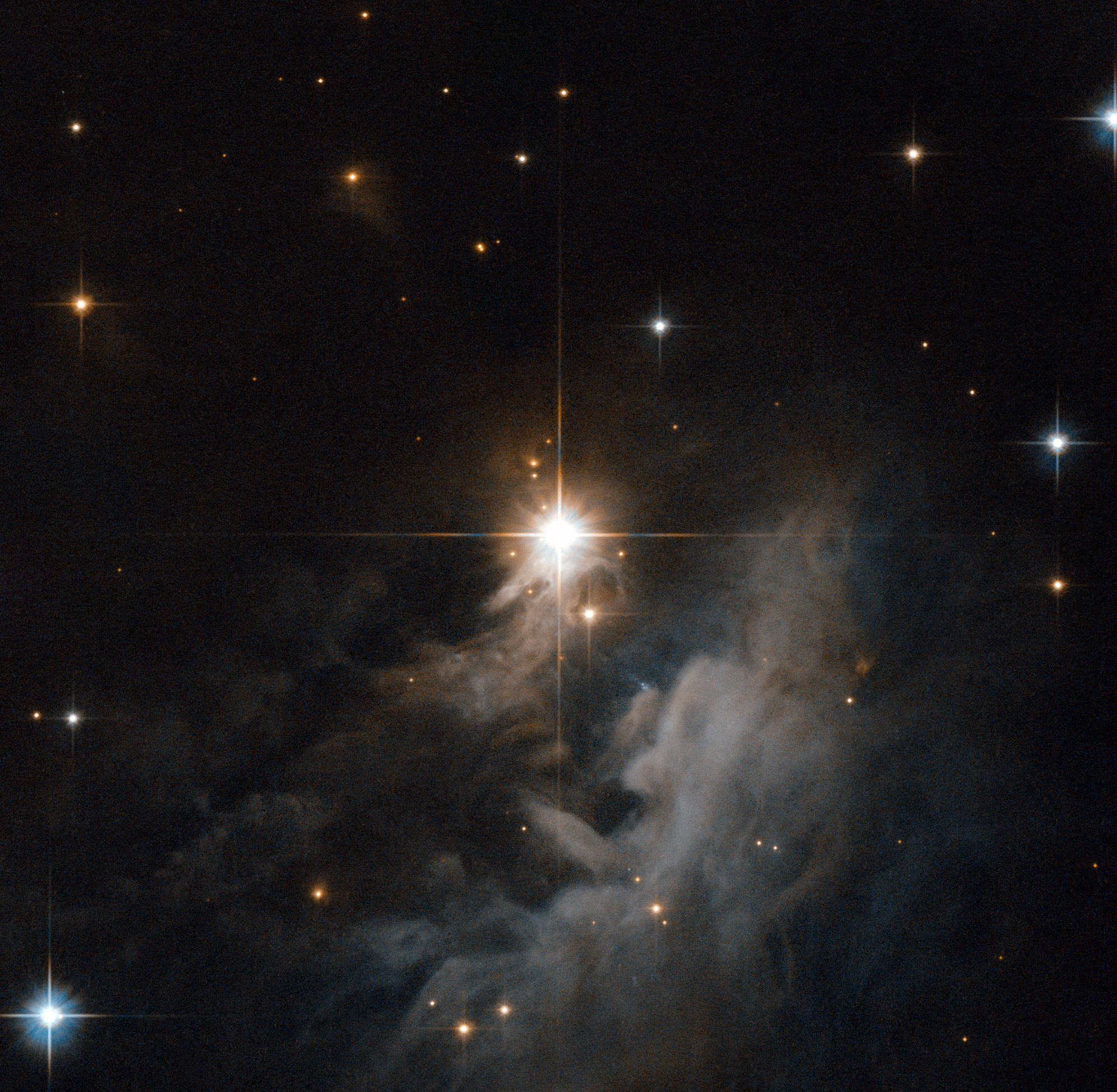
Reflection nebula IRAS 10082-5647 observed by the Hubble Space Telescope.

These interstellar clouds possess a velocity higher than can be explained by the rotation of the Milky Way. By definition, these clouds must have a v_{lsr} greater than 90 km s^{−1}, where v_{lsr} is the local standard rest velocity. They are detected primarily in the 21 cm line of neutral hydrogen, and typically have a lower portion of heavy elements than is normal for interstellar clouds in the Milky Way.

Theories intended to explain these unusual clouds include materials left over from the formation of the galaxy, or tidally-displaced matter drawn away from other galaxies or members of the Local Group. An example of the latter is the Magellanic Stream. To narrow down the origin of these clouds, a better understanding of their distances and metallicity is needed.

High-velocity clouds are identified with an HVC prefix, as with HVC 127-41-330.

== See also ==
- List of molecules in interstellar space
- Nebula
- Interplanetary medium – interplanetary dust
- Interstellar medium – interstellar dust
- Intergalactic medium – Intergalactic dust
- Local Interstellar Cloud
- G-Cloud
