= Magellanic Clouds =

Two dwarf galaxies orbiting the Milky Way

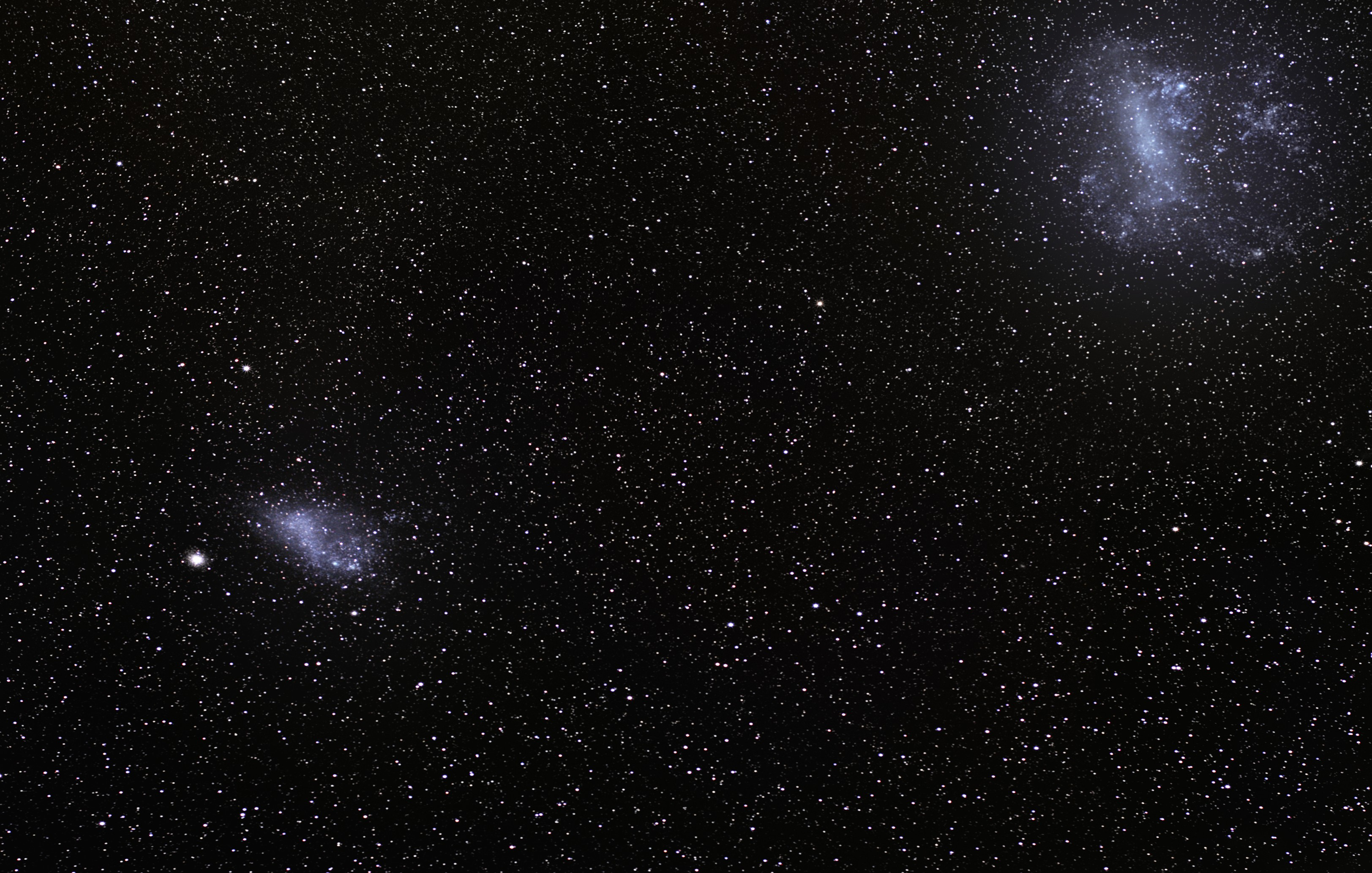
The Large and Small Magellanic Clouds

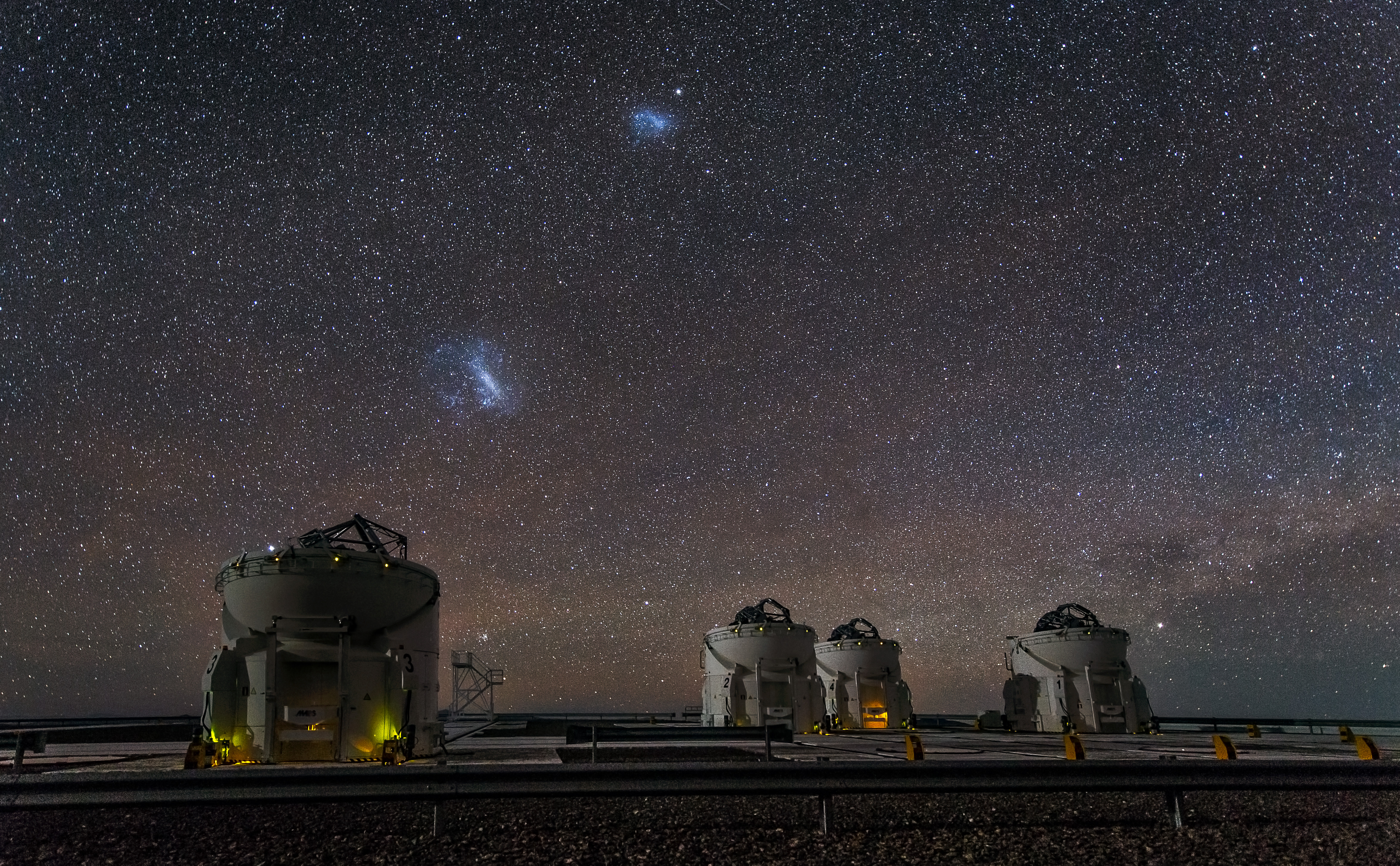
Small and Large Magellanic Clouds over Paranal Observatory

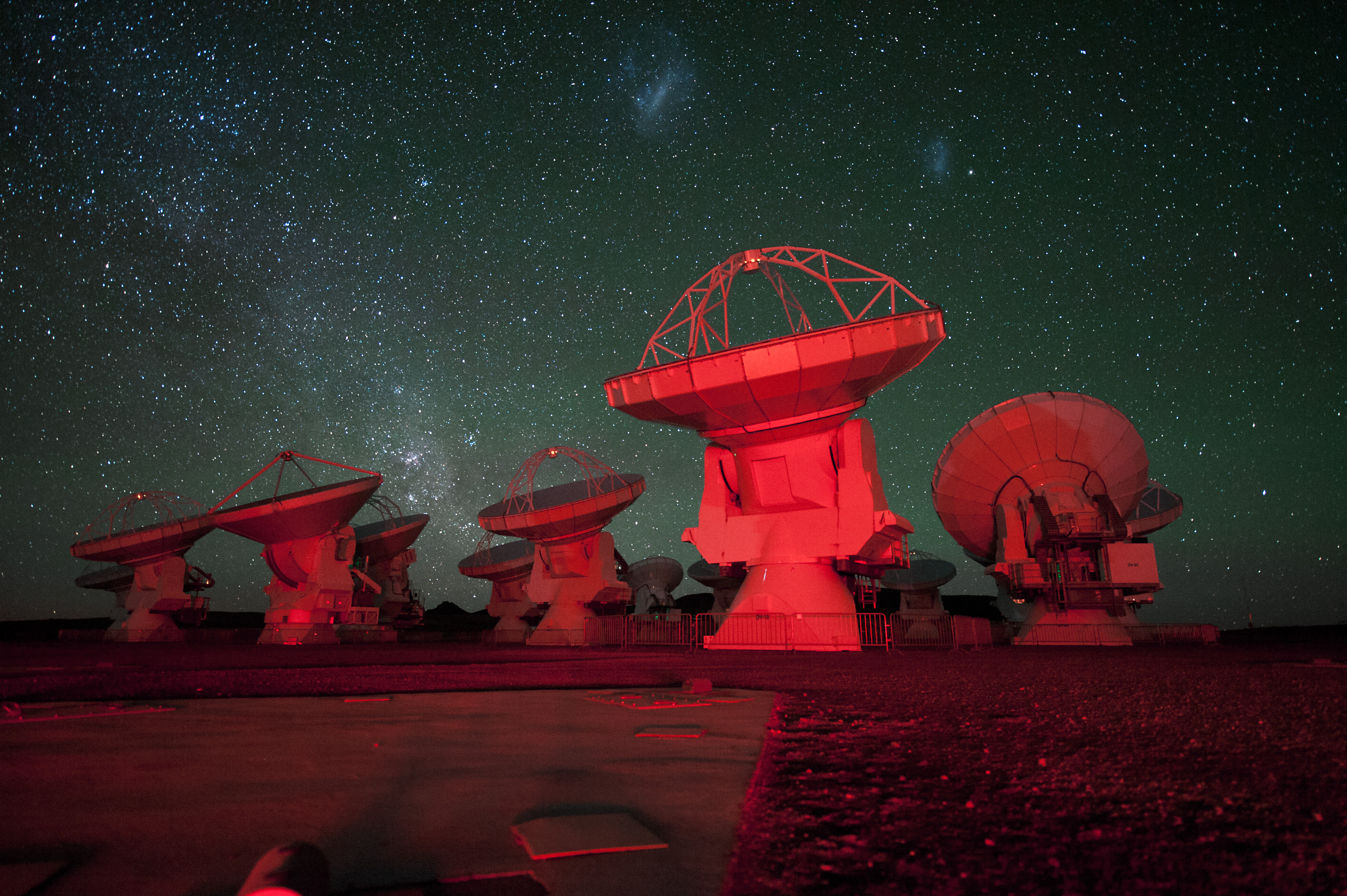
ALMA antennae bathed in red light. In the background are the southern Milky Way on the left and the Magellanic Clouds at the top.

The Magellanic Clouds (Magellanic system or Nubeculae Magellani) are two irregular dwarf galaxies in the southern celestial hemisphere. Orbiting the Milky Way galaxy, these satellite galaxies are members of the Local Group. Because both show signs of a bar structure, they are often reclassified as Magellanic spiral galaxies.

The two galaxies are the following:

- Large Magellanic Cloud (LMC), about 163 kly (50 kpc) away
- Small Magellanic Cloud (SMC), about 206 kly (63 kpc) away

The Magellanic Clouds are visible to the unaided eye from the Southern Hemisphere, but cannot be observed from the most northern latitudes.

== History ==
They may be the objects mentioned by the polymath Ibn Qutaybah (d. 889 CE), in his book on Al-Anwā̵’ (the stations of the Moon in pre-Islamic Arabian culture):

وأسفل من سهيل قدما سهيل . وفى مجرى قدمى سهيل، من خلفهما كواكب زهر كبار، لا ترى بالعراق، يسميها أهل تهامة الأعبار

And below Canopus, there are the feet of Canopus, and on their extension, behind them bright big stars, not seen in Iraq, the people of Tihama call them al-a‘bār.

Later in 964 CE the astronomer Al Sufi, in his Book of Fixed Stars, mentioned the same quote, but with a different spelling. Under Argo Navis, he quoted that "unnamed others have claimed that beneath Canopus there are two stars known as the 'feet of Canopus', and beneath those there are bright white stars that are unseen in Iraq nor Najd, and that the inhabitants of Tihama call them al-Baqar [cows], and Ptolemy did not mention any of this so we [Al-Sufi] do not know if this is true or false." Both Ibn Qutaybah and Al-Sufi were probably quoting from the former's contemporary (and compatriot) and famed scientist Abu Hanifa Dinawari's mostly lost work on Anwaa. Abu Hanifa was probably quoting earlier sources, which may be just travelers stories, and hence Al-Sufi's comments about their veracity. These reports are now thought to refer to some stars south of Canopus.

In Europe, the Clouds were reported by 16th century Italian authors Peter Martyr d'Anghiera and Andrea Corsali, both based on Portuguese voyages. Subsequently, they were reported by Antonio Pigafetta, who accompanied the expedition of Ferdinand Magellan on its circumnavigation of the world in 1519–1522. However, naming the clouds after Magellan did not become widespread until much later. Whilst sailors used the name, as Edmund Halley noted in 1679, the first astronomer to use the term 'Magellanic Clouds' in a scientific paper was John Herschel in 1847.

In Bayer's Uranometria of 1603 they are designated as nubecula major and nubecula minor. In the 1756 star map of the French astronomer Lacaille, they are designated as le Grand Nuage and le Petit Nuage ("the Large Cloud" and "the Small Cloud"). John Herschel studied the Magellanic Clouds from South Africa, writing an 1847 report detailing 919 objects in the Large Magellanic Cloud and 244 objects in the Small Magellanic Cloud. In 1867 Cleveland Abbe suggested that they were separate satellite galaxies of the Milky Way.

Distances were first estimated by Ejnar Hertzsprung in 1913 using 1912 measurements of Cepheid variables in the SMC by Henrietta Leavitt. Recalibration of the Cepheid scales allowed Harlow Shapley to refine the measurement, and these were again revised in 1952 following further research.

== Characteristics ==
The Large Magellanic Cloud and its neighbour and relative, the Small Magellanic Cloud, are conspicuous objects in the southern hemisphere, looking like separated pieces of the Milky Way to the naked eye. Roughly 21° apart in the night sky, the true distance between them is roughly 75,000 light-years. Until the discovery of the Sagittarius Dwarf Elliptical Galaxy in 1994, they were the closest known galaxies to the Milky Way. The LMC lies about 160,000 light years away, while the SMC is around 200,000. The LMC is about 70% larger than the diameter of the SMC (32,200 ly and 18,900 ly respectively). For comparison, the Milky Way is about 100,000 ly across.

The total mass of these two galaxies is uncertain. Only a fraction of their gas seems to have coalesced into stars and they probably both have large dark matter halos. One recent estimate of the total mass of the LMC is about 1/10 that of the Milky Way. That would make the LMC a rather large galaxy in the current observable universe. Since the sizes of relatively nearby galaxies are highly skewed, the average mass can be a misleading statistic. In terms of rank, the LMC appears to be the fourth most massive member of over 50 galaxies in the local group. Suggesting that the Magellanic cloud system is historically not a part of the Milky Way is evidence that the SMC has been in orbit about the LMC for a very long time. The Magellanic system seems most similar to the distinct NGC 3109 system, which is on the edge of the Local Group.

Astronomers have long assumed that the Magellanic Clouds have orbited the Milky Way at approximately their current distances, but evidence suggests that it is rare for them to come as close to the Milky Way as they are now. Observation and theoretical evidence suggest that the Magellanic Clouds have both been greatly distorted by tidal interaction with the Milky Way as they travel close to it. The LMC maintains a very clear spiral structure in radio-telescope images of neutral hydrogen. Streams of neutral hydrogen connect them to the Milky Way and to each other, and both resemble disrupted barred spiral galaxies. Their gravity has affected the Milky Way as well, distorting the outer parts of the galactic disk.

Aside from their different structure and lower mass, they differ from our galaxy in two major ways. They are gas-rich; a higher fraction of their mass is hydrogen and helium compared to the Milky Way. They are also more metal-poor than the Milky Way; the youngest stars in the LMC and SMC have a metallicity of 0.5 and 0.25 times solar, respectively. Both are noted for their nebulae and young stellar populations, but as in our own galaxy their stars range from the very young to the very old, indicating a long stellar formation history.

The Large Magellanic Cloud was the host galaxy to a supernova (SN 1987A), the brightest observed in over four centuries.

Measurements with the Hubble Space Telescope, announced in 2006, suggest the Magellanic Clouds may be moving too fast to be long-term companions of the Milky Way. If they are in orbit, that orbit takes at least 4 billion years. They are possibly on a first approach and we are witnessing the start of a galactic merger that may overlap with the Milky Way's potential merger with the Andromeda Galaxy (and perhaps the Triangulum Galaxy) in the future. However, it is not yet certain if these collisions will occur as recent models indicate that gravitational influences from the Large Magellanic Cloud and Triangulum Galaxy have an approximately 50% chance to prevent a merger of the Milky Way and Andromeda Galaxy.

In 2019, astronomers discovered the young star cluster Price-Whelan 1 using Gaia data. The star cluster has a low metallicity and belongs to the leading arm of the Magellanic Clouds. The existence of this star cluster suggests that the leading arm of the Magellanic Clouds is 90,000 light-years away from the Milky Way—closer than previously thought.

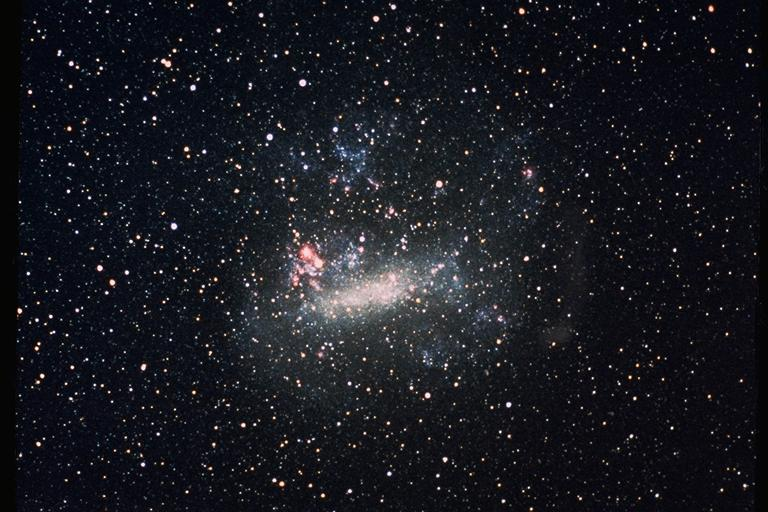
The Large Magellanic Cloud (LMC).

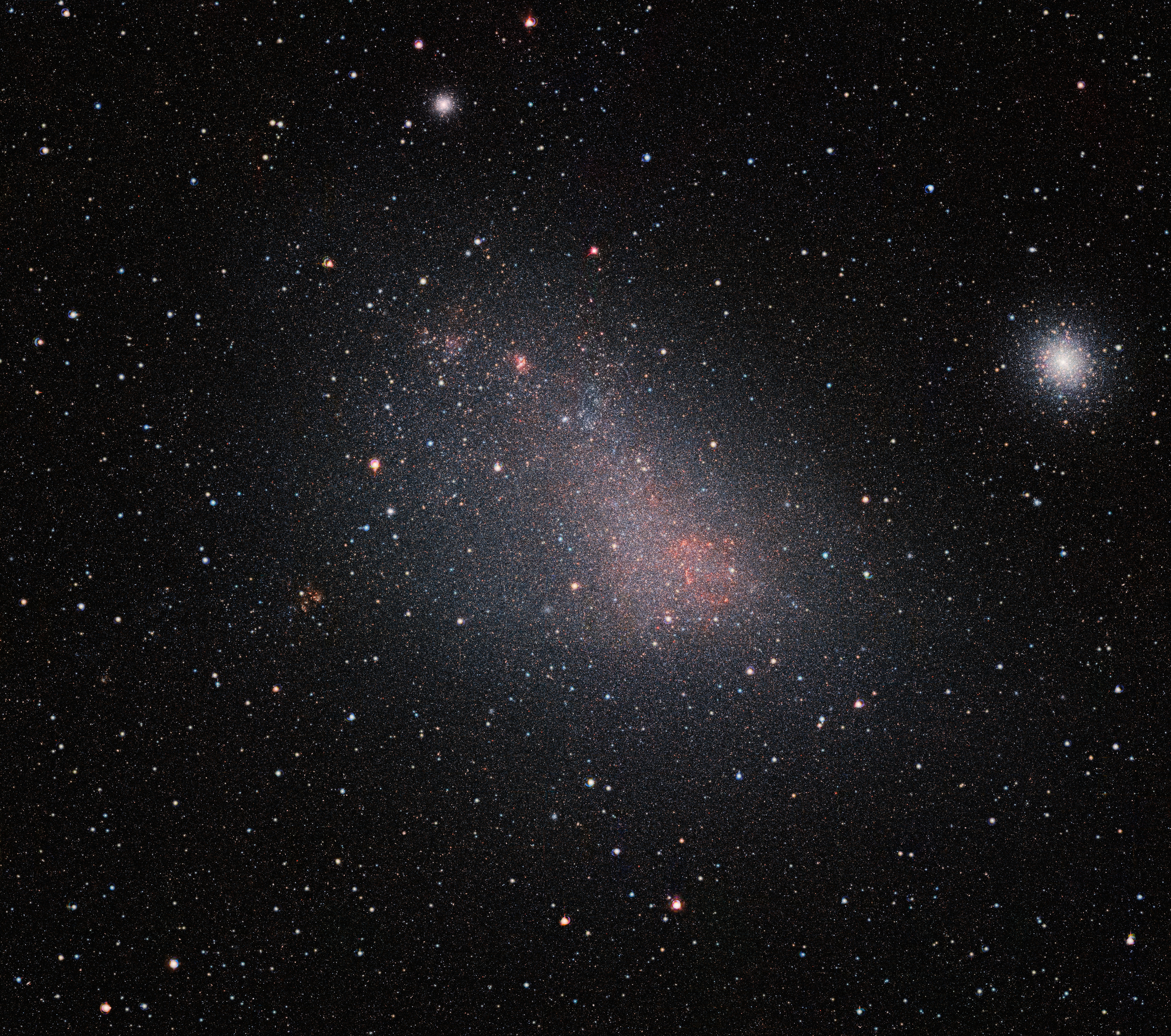
Small Magellanic Cloud (SMC).

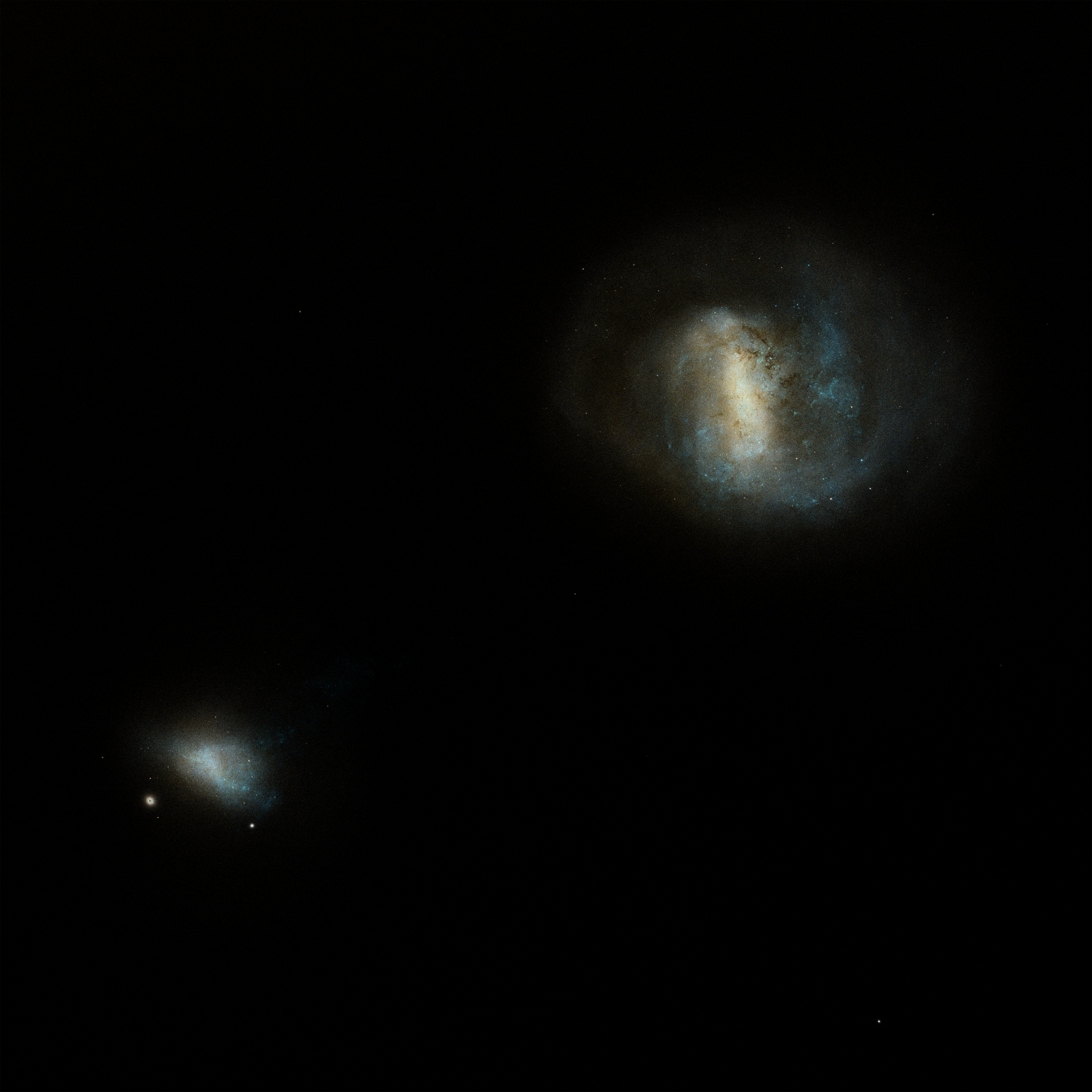
LMC and SMC rendered from Gaia EDR3 data with foreground stars removed

== Mini Magellanic Cloud (MMC) ==
Astrophysicists D. S. Mathewson, V. L. Ford and N. Visvanathan proposed that the SMC may in fact be split in two, with a smaller section of this galaxy behind the main part of the SMC (as seen from Earth's perspective), and separated by about 30,000 light years. They suggest the reason for this is due to a past interaction with the LMC splitting the SMC, and that the two sections are still moving apart. They have dubbed this smaller remnant the Mini Magellanic Cloud. This hypothesis was confirmed in 2023. The part of the SMC which is closer to Earth lies 196,000 light-years (60 kiloparsecs) away, whereas the farther part lies 215,000 light-years (66 kiloparsecs) away.

== See also ==
- Astronomical surveys of the Magellanic Clouds
- Irregular galaxy
- Magellanic Bridge
- Magellanic Stream

== Sources ==
- Eric Chaisson and Steve McMillan, Astronomy Today (Englewood Cliffs: Prentice-Hall, 1993), p. 550.
- Michael Zeilik, Conceptual Astronomy (New York: John Wiley & Sons, 1993), pp. 357–8.
