= The Naked Scientists =

Science podcast and BBC radio talk show

- Genre: Science talk radio / podcast
- Running time: 60 minutes
- Country of origin: United Kingdom
- Language: English
- Home station: BBC Radio in the East of England; Worldwide Online and as a podcast; BBC 5 Live; ABC Radio National; Radio New Zealand National; Talk Radio 702 / 567 Cape Talk, South Africa
- Hosted by: Chris Smith
- Website: www.thenakedscientists.com

The Naked Scientists is a one-hour audience-interactive science radio talk show broadcast live by the BBC nationally on BBC Radio 5 Live (until 12 January 2025), and internationally on Friday nights on ABC Radio National, Australia; it is also distributed globally as a podcast.

The programme was created and is edited by Cambridge University consultant virologist Dr Chris Smith. Former Naked Scientists line-up members include producers Phil Sansom, Adam Murphy, and Katie Haylor, with Peter Cowley adding ad-hoc technology perspectives.

== History ==
Dr Chris Smith launched The Naked Scientists in 2001, rebranding the programme from a previous incarnation created in 2000 called ScienceWorld. Initially on commercial local radio, the show moved to the BBC's eastern region local radio network in 2003 where it was aired on Sundays on all 8 stations across the region. In August 2012, BBC East in response to national changes to local radio provision announced an impending change to the Sunday schedule which would have seen the show discontinued. In response to public reaction, the head of BBC East, Mick Rawsthorne, was interviewed on national radio about the decision to end the programme. Rawsthorne explained that the Naked Scientists did not fit the station's core purpose of providing "local radio". However, Rawsthorne did acknowledge the quality of the Naked Scientists programming and recognised that, with Cambridge University at the heart of Cambridgeshire, special consideration should be made for science in Cambridgeshire. Consequently, the BBC reconsidered their decision to terminate the programme and developed a proposal for it to continue as well as a way for enhanced scientific coverage and content to be integrated with other mainstream mid-week outputs of BBC Cambridgeshire, significantly increasing the reach of the programme and the representation of science at BBC Radio Cambridgeshire. In August 2022 the show switched to a Thursday evening from its original Sunday slot, a move intended to capitalise on the news agenda and a more powerful slot. It ran in this segment until the end of August 2023 when, prompted by changes to the BBC local radio schedule nationwide, this outing of the show ended.

From January 2013, a new initiative involving the Naked Scientists also began on BBC Radio Norfolk. A dedicated hour of science Q and A was included in the station's Tea Time output (hosted by Matthew Gudgin) on alternate Wednesday evenings at 6pm. Listeners call, text, tweet or email with questions on any scientific subject and the team answer them. This continued until 2020 when changes were introduced to the schedule and presenter line up during the response to Covid-19.

From January 2013, the Naked Scientists programme also began to air across Australia on ABC Radio National, initially on a Sunday morning. From January 2014 the first airing of the programme was moved to a Friday evening 10pm slot, repeated on Sundays at 3pm. This show is also released as the Naked Scientists Podcast.

Launched in May 2014, 5 Live Science is a new weekly one-hour programme from the Naked Scientists aired by BBC 5 live. Under the banner 5 live Science, it's a newly formatted version of the show produced by the Naked Scientists team and fronted by Dr Chris Smith; it aired nationally every Sunday morning until 12 January 2025. The programme is also released as a podcast under the same name.

The Naked Scientists collaborated with Dr Tom Crawford shortly after he completed his PhD in 2017 to produce a series of videos called "Naked Mathematics", in order to engage young people and break stereotypes around maths. Through this, he became known as "The Naked Mathematician".

=== Awards ===
| Award | Year | Category | Result | Ref. |
|---|---|---|---|---|
| Academy of Podcasters | 2015 | Science & Medicine | Finalist | |
| Biosciences Federation | 2006 | Science Communication | Won | |
| Joshua Phillips Award | 2007 | Innovation in Science Engagement | Won | |
| Society for General Microbiology | 2008 | Peter Wildy Prize | Won | |
| Royal Society | 2008 | Kohn Award | Won | |
| Population Institute's 29th Global Media Awards | 2008 | Best Radio Show Award | Won | |
| European Podcast Award | 2008 / 2009 | UK Non-Profit podcast | Won | |
| Royal College of Pathologists | 2010 | Furness Prize for science communication | Won | |
| Society of Biology | 2012 | Science Communication Prize | Won | |
| World Podcast Awards | 2006 | finalist | Finalist | |
| World Podcast Awards | 2007 | best produced | Won | |
| World Podcast Awards | 2007 | best science and technology podcast | Won | |
| World Podcast Awards | 2008 | finalist | Finalist | |
| World Podcast Awards | 2009 | finalist | Finalist | |

== Content ==
Each episode of the main Naked Scientists programme is one hour long and includes a digest of topical science news stories, audience questions answered live on the air and interviews with guest scientists. These individuals join the hosts in the studio to talk about their work and to take questions live from listeners. Previous featured guests include the discoverer of the DNA fingerprint, Alec Jeffreys, the Astronomer Royal Sir Martin Rees, and the co-discoverer of DNA structure, James D. Watson.

The show also features on-location reports and interviews, and an ad-hoc interactive segment called Kitchen Science where listeners are encouraged to attempt a science experiment at home during the show. Kitchen Science experiments have included building a desktop trebuchet, a chocolate teapot and a liver powered bottle rocket. The Kitchen Science segment also hosts experiments that listeners may not be able to do at home, such as generating X-rays from Sticky Tape with Dr Carlos Camara of UCLA and testing how much fat would stop a bullet with researchers at Cambridge University's Cavendish Laboratory.

== Other media ==
The Naked Scientists appeared on TV Channel Five's panel game The What in the World? Quiz and have contributed to the 2007 Channel 4 programme "The Farm Revealed". In September 2008, with the Open University, the Naked Scientists launched a new UK national radio edition of their programme, The Naked Scientists - Up All Night (subsequently renamed "Breaking Science") which was broadcast on BBC Radio 5 Live for 12 months before finishing in 2009.

In November 2008, with the Royal Society of Chemistry, a series entitled The Naked Scientists In Africa began on Channel Africa, the international broadcasting service of the South African Broadcasting Corporation. The Naked Scientists in Africa was produced by Naked Scientist team-member Meera Senthilingam, incorporating international science news and a focus on science stories originating in, or pertinent to, African countries. This project ran until 2010.
