= Chris Smith (science communicator) =

Consultant virologist, broadcaster

- Born: 1975 (age 50–51); Essex, England
- Occupations: Medical doctor, and science broadcaster
- Notable work: Founder and presenter of The Naked Scientists podcast and the related BBC radio programme 5Live Science

Chris Smith (born 16 January 1975) – "the Naked Scientist" – is a British consultant virologist and a lecturer based at Cambridge University where he is a fellow of Queens' College. He is also a science radio broadcaster and writer, and presents The Naked Scientists, a programme which he founded in 2001, for BBC Radio and other networks internationally, as well as 5 Live Science on BBC Radio 5 Live.

== Qualifications ==
Chris Smith has a Cambridge University medical degree (MB BChir) and a PhD in virology. He also gained a First Class Honours degree in neuroscience from University College London (UCL). He is a Fellow of the Royal College of Pathologists (FRCPath) and is on the General Medical Council (GMC) specialist register for medical microbiology and virology, practising as he does as a consultant clinical virologist at Addenbrooke's Hospital, Cambridge.

== Naked Scientists podcast ==
The Naked Scientists podcast, launched by Smith in 2001, and distributed as one of the first iTunes podcasts from 2005, was also the first BBC local and regional programme to be published as a podcast. In its first twelve months it received 2 million programme downloads.

In January 2010, Smith's The Naked Scientists group announced on Twitter that, just ahead of the 10th anniversary of the project's launch, the number of downloaded programme episodes had hit 10 million internationally. At a presentation at the 2011 AAAS Meeting in Washington DC, Smith showed that, by February 2011, over 17 million episodes of the Naked Scientists podcast had been downloaded globally. During a 2014 visit to Perth, Western Australia, where Smith holds a Sir Walter Murdoch Distinguished Adjunct Professorship at Murdoch University, he announced that the number of downloads exceeds 40 million. Current estimates are that the programme has been downloaded more than 140 million times worldwide.

== Other work ==
In addition to his work with the Naked Scientists, Smith appears live every Friday morning on Australia's ABC Radio National Breakfast with Fran Kelly, supplying an update of the week's leading science news. He has also contributed to Robyn Williams' The Science Show on the same station, and also appears on Johannesburg-based South African station TalkRadio 702 for thirty minutes every Friday morning with a half-hour science news round-up and listener question phone-in. Between 2011 and 2017 when the programme was discontinued, Radio New Zealand National's This Way Up show, hosted by journalist Simon Morton on Saturdays, also included a Naked Science contribution from Smith; since 2013 BBC Radio Norfolk has been running a Naked Scientists Wednesday teatime science phone-in as part of their drive time offering.

Until May 2014, Smith provided a weekly 25-minute science round-up for BBC Radio 5 Live's Up All Night programme every Monday. This was replaced by the new weekly one-hour 5 live Science programme, which is also produced by Smith and his colleagues and airs on Sunday mornings and is sometimes repeated on a Sunday evening.

Smith also founded and presented the first 100 episodes of the Nature Podcast for the journal Nature in 2005. This show was the first example of an international science journal producing an audio programme to supplement its printed content. He has also contributed podcast content for the open access publishing group PLoS (Public Library of Science), he launched and hosted the Royal Society of Chemistry's "Chemistry World" Podcast for nearly 10 years and, in 2013, launched the monthly eLife Podcast for the open access online journal eLife, which he currently presents.

Smith is a consultant virologist at the University of Cambridge. He is also a Fellow of Queens' College, Cambridge, and Public Understanding of Science Fellow at the Institute of Continuing Education.

== Books ==
In September 2006 Chris Smith published Naked Science, his first book, which is an anthology of science stories based on the material presented on The Naked Scientists. This was followed, in September 2008, by Crisp Packet Fireworks, a collection of 50 science experiments to try at home using every-day ingredients found in the average kitchen. This title, which was co-authored with Naked Scientist colleague David Ansell and published by New Holland, was initially launched in the UK, Australia and New Zealand. In January 2010 it was also published in South Africa by Struik and Random House under the title Maverick Science, and launched in the US in April 2010 as Spectacular Science. In December 2008 Chris published a sequel to Naked Science, The Return of the Naked Scientist, with Random House in Australia and New Zealand. He released a fourth book, Stripping Down Science, also with Random House Australia, in December 2010.

== COVID-19 coronavirus pandemic ==
Smith has been called upon during the COVID-19 coronavirus pandemic to contribute to international media, including television news channels, BBC Radio 4's PM programme, Jeremy Vine's programme on BBC Radio 2, Radio New Zealand and he co-hosted the "Commonsense coronavirus call-in" on Saturday afternoons with Colin Murray on BBC Radio 5 Live, explaining the spread of the pandemic, answering listener questions and commenting on scientific and medical developments.

== Awards and honours ==
Smith's work on the Naked Scientists won him the Biosciences Federation Prize for Science Communication, 2006, the JOSH Award 2007, the Society for General Microbiology's Peter Wildy Prize 2008, the Royal Society Kohn Award for 2008, the Best Radio Show Award at the Population Institute's 29th Global Media Awards, 2008, the European Podcast Award for UK Non-Profit podcast, the inaugural Royal College of Pathologists Furness Prize for Science Communication, 2010 and the Society of Biology's Science Communication Prize, 2012. In 2016 Smith received an honorary doctorate (DSc) from Queen Mary University of London (QMUL) in recognition of his contributions to broadcasting and public understanding of science In 2020, the Royal College of Pathologists recognised Smith's contribution to science communication during the COVID-19 pandemic with an achievement award.
