= Maayane Soumagnac =

French-Israeli astrophysicist (born 1987)

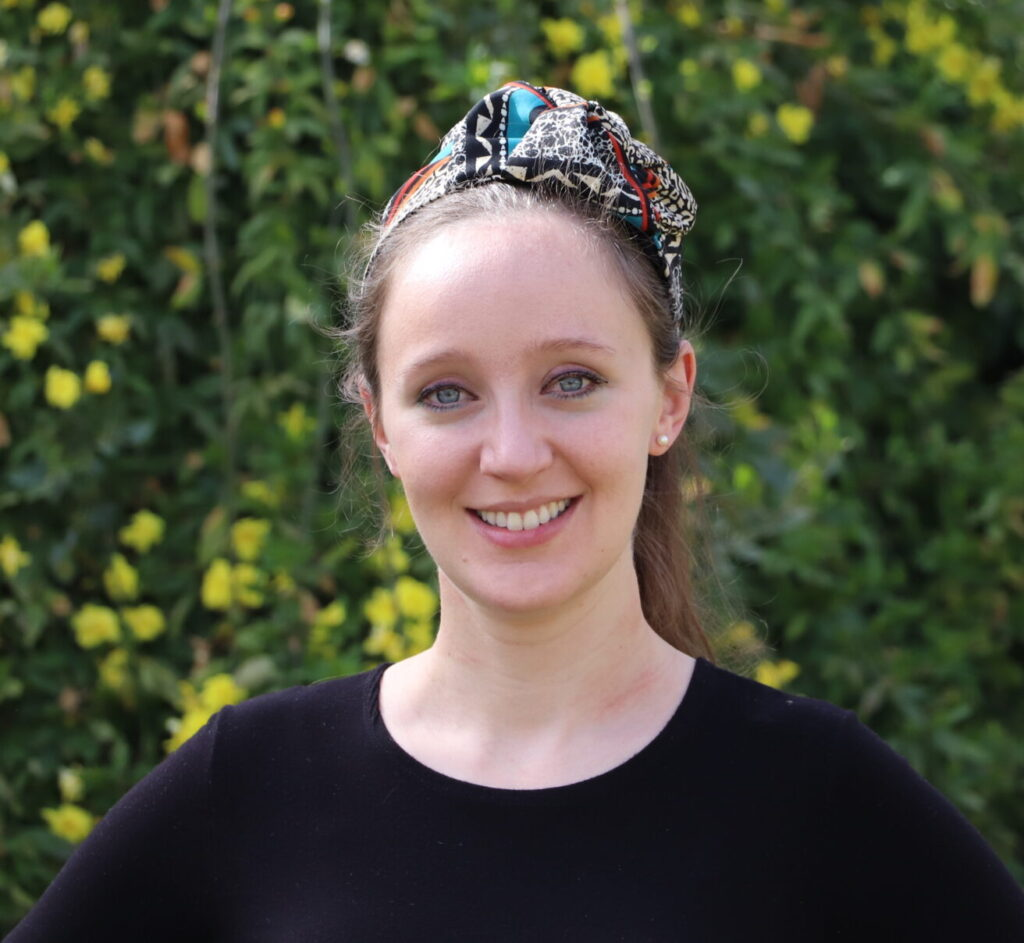
- Maayane Soumagnac in Jerusalem, March 2024
- Born: 13 March 1987 (age 39)
- Education: École normale supérieure Paris-Saclay École normale supérieure de Lyon University College London
- Scientific career
- Institutions: Bar-Ilan University Lawrence Berkeley National Laboratory Weizmann Institute of Science
- Thesis: Tipping scales in galaxy surveys: Star/Galaxy separation and scale-depende bias
- Doctoral advisor: Ofer Lahav
- Website: https://maayanesoumagnac.com

Maayane Tamar Soumagnac (born 13 March 1987) is a French-Israeli astrophysicist and social activist, senior lecturer (the Israeli equivalent of Assistant Professor) in the Physics department at the Bar-Ilan University.

== Early life and education ==
After obtaining her bacclaureat in the Lycée Henri IV, Soumagnac studied Physics at the Ecole Normale Superieure Cachan and the Ecole Normale Superieure Lyon, graduating in 2009. She completed her PhD at the University College London in 2015. under the supervision of Ofer Lahav.

== Research and career ==
Soumagnac's research explores the interface between big data and Astrophysics.

After completing her PhD, Soumagnac joined the Weizmann Institute of Science, where she was a postdoctoral fellow of the Ilan Ramon foundation, worked on time-domain astronomy using the Zwicky Transient Facility and served as the assistant project scientist of the ULTRASAT UV satellite.

In 2019, she joined the Computational research division at the Lawrence Berkeley National Laboratory, focusing on X-ray astronomy and the synergy between transient surveys and the Dark Energy Spectroscopic Instrument collaboration, where she served as the chair of the transients working group. In 2021, while remaining an Affiliate at the Berkeley National Lab, Soumagnac joined the physics department at Bar-Ilan University, becoming the third woman to hold a faculty position in Astrophysics in Israel.

Soumagnac is involved in projects aimed at bringing astronomy to the public, and has given outreach talks at various venues, including the Neve Tirtza Women's prison. She has been involved in several initiatives to inspire children and encourage women to pursue space-related careers.

Soumagnac is an alumna of the International Space University and has served as a lecturer for the ISU Executive Space Program.

== Social and political activism ==
Soumagnac became active in the "Hitorerut in Jerusalem" political movement in 2015. She led several projects to foster dialogue between communities in Jerusalem and promote pluralism in the public sphere, gaining local media coverage. She ran for the Jerusalem city council in the 2024 elections, securing the tenth position on the list.

Soumagnac is among the founders of the Independent minyan "Shabbat Baboker", located in the Rehavia neighbourhood of Jerusalem.

== Personal life ==
Soumagnac's maternal grandmother is the actress Henia Suchar. Her paternal grand-aunt is the musicologist and the chevalier de l'Ordre des Arts et des Lettres Myriam Soumagnac.

She is mentioned in the 2018 book "Israel, Island of success" by Noga Kainan and Adam Reuters. She is married and has four children.
