= BSPR =

BSPR may stand for:

- Boise State Public Radio
- Boston Society for Psychical Research
- British Society for Proteome Research, a member of the UK Biosciences Federation
- British Society for the Philosophy of Religion
