= Stargazing Live =

Live BBC television programme

- Genre: Popular science, astronomy
- Presented by: Brian Cox (2011–17, 2019); Dara Ó Briain (2011–17, 2019); Liz Bonnin (2011–17); Mark Thompson (2011–14); Lucie Green (2015–16); Greg Quicke (2017)
- Country of origin: United Kingdom
- Original language: English
- No. of series: 7
- No. of episodes: 21 (including 3 specials); 13 (Back to Earth)

Production
- Production locations: Jodrell Bank Observatory (2011–16); Science Museum, London (2015); Siding Spring Observatory (2017); Kennedy Space Center (2019)
- Running time: 60 mins (main show); 30 mins (Back to Earth)

Original release
- Network: BBC Two (2011–17, 2019); BBC HD (2011–13); BBC Two HD (2014–17, 2019); BBC One (2015)
- Release: 3 January 2011 – 28 March 2017
- Release: 15 July 2019

Related
- Volcano Live

Stargazing Live is a British live television programme on astronomy that was broadcast yearly on BBC Two over three nights every winter from 2011 to 2017. The series was primarily presented by scientist Brian Cox and comedian and amateur astronomer Dara Ó Briain with support from TV presenter and biochemist Liz Bonnin and astronomer Mark Thompson. For the first six series, the show was broadcast from Jodrell Bank Observatory in Cheshire, and featured live links from scientific facilities in locations such as Hawaii, South Africa, and Norway. The seventh series in 2017 was broadcast from Siding Spring Observatory in Australia, and a special episode filmed at Kennedy Space Center was broadcast in July 2019 to celebrate the 50th anniversary of the Apollo 11 mission.

== Overview ==
The first series was scheduled to coincide with the partial Solar eclipse of 4 January 2011, a conjunction of Jupiter and Uranus, and the Quadrantid meteor shower. It also featured Jonathan Ross learning how to spot planets, and a discussion with the International Space Station. Newly qualified British ESA astronaut Tim Peake appeared as a guest.

Scientific advisors for the first series included Dan Hillier, manager of the Royal Observatory, Edinburgh visitor centre.

To coincide with each series of the show, hundreds of Stargazing Live events were run across the UK, including star parties and 'sidewalk astronomy' sessions. Many of these events were organised by local astronomy societies and universities.

The show returned for a second series on 16–18 January 2012. The first episode had a theme about the Moon, including a live interview with 'the last man on the Moon', Apollo 17 astronaut Eugene Cernan. The second episode had a focus on black holes, and the third on the possible existence of extra-terrestrial life. Each episode included different guests, such as impressionist and amateur astronomer, Jon Culshaw on the second night. The final episode also included a feature titled the "Great Big Dulverton Switch Off" where every light in the town of Dulverton, Somerset was switched off live on TV to highlight the issue of light pollution. Each episode of the series was immediately followed by Back to Earth, an additional half-hour discussion of the main show.

The second series was a co-production with the Open University, with OU science consultants Dr Andrew Norton, Dr Dave Rothery and Dr Stephen Serjeant.

During the 2012 series, viewers were encouraged to help locate possible exoplanets, planets orbiting stars outside the Solar System, by volunteering some time on the Planet Hunters online citizen science project. This led to the discovery of a new Neptune-sized exoplanet by two amateur astronomers, one in Peterborough, England, to be named Threapleton Holmes B.

The third series returned with another three episodes. As with the last series, a "Back to Earth" chat was held after each episode. A citizen science project was again featured, this time asking viewers to help in identifying areas of interest in aerial photographs of the surface of Mars. Another feature which ran across the three nights involved the construction of a modern version of William Herschel's 20-foot telescope at the University of Derby.

The fourth series appeared in January 2014, with the citizen science project asking viewers to look for evidence of gravitational lensing in deep space photographs, which resulted in the discovery of dozens of previously unknown galaxies. The series also featured live broadcasts from Norway with the aim of capturing the aurora borealis on camera; although the show's publicity emphasised that the unpredictable nature of the aurora meant this attempt could easily fail, an unexpectedly large coronal mass ejection that week resulted in strong auroral activity, with live footage of the phenomenon being captured on all three nights.

Stargazing Live returned in 2015 but it was not held in the usual January slot which has been the usual month for all previous events; it was held on 18 to 20 March instead to coincide with next total solar eclipse which took place on 20 March 2015.

On 6 November 2015, the BBC confirmed two special episodes of Stargazing Live which aired on 15 December 2015, with Dara Ó Briain and Professor Brian Cox, covering the launch of Expedition 46 to the International Space Station with British astronaut Tim Peake aboard. The first special entitled Blast Off Live: A Stargazing Special covered the launch of Expedition 46 at 11:05 am. A latter programme Stargazing Live Special: Tim Peake Docking covered the missions' docking with the ISS that same evening.

Simultaneously the BBC confirmed a sixth series of Stargazing Live, which began in January 2016, featuring coverage of Tim Peake aboard the International Space Station.

The seventh series of Stargazing Live was broadcast from Australia on 18–20 March 2017, taking advantage of the Equinox to match the last three-quarters of an hour of darkness in Australia or an 8:00pm broadcast time in the UK.

After a two-year hiatus, Stargazing Live returned for a one-off live special on BBC Two to air on Monday 15 July 2019 from 9.00pm – 10.30pm. To celebrate the 50th anniversary of the Apollo 11 Moon landing, Dara O'Briain and Professor Brian Cox travelled to Cape Canaveral, Florida where the historic Apollo 11 mission began. They heard first-hand from Apollo 16 astronaut Charlie Duke on what it was like to guide Neil Armstrong and Buzz Aldrin to the surface of the Moon in the Lunar Lander, and how Duke followed in their footsteps three years later. They also looked at the most exciting new developments and, with privileged access, they broadcast from the top of launch tower that was being prepared for crewed missions and from the assembly line of a spacecraft factory. They were joined by astrophysicist and medic Dr Kevin Fong and mathematician Dr Hannah Fry, who explored the latest developments in human space flight – from cutting-edge spacewalk technology to a future Mars buggy.

== Stargazing Live in Australia ==
In 2017, following on from the seventh series of BBC Stargazing Live in Australia, ABC TV broadcast an Australia-focused series on 4–6 April 2017, co-anchored by Brian Cox and Australian television presenter Julia Zemiro and featuring journalist Kumi Taguchi. The BBC Australian program was similar to the UK format, as the hosts were joined by professional astrophysicists such as Lisa Harvey-Smith and Chris Lintott, amateur astronomer Greg Quicke, and Indigenous Australian Michael Anderson who shared the astronomical knowledge of Indigenous Australians and their connection with the cosmos. The citizen science project discovered four new "Super Earth" exoplanets.

A second Australian series aired on 22–24 May 2018. It featured a Guinness World Record for the most people simultaneously observing an object in the night sky, when approximately 40,000 registered citizens watched the moon for 10 minutes on 23 May. The citizen science project discovered two new type Ia supernovae. Comedian Tim Minchin performed the Monty Python Galaxy Song in a duet with Cox.

A third series ran 26–28 February 2019. A prerecorded special Stargazing: Moon And Beyond aired on July 16, 2019.

== Episodes ==
Series	Episodes	Originally released		Average UK viewers (in millions)	Location
Series	Episodes	First released	Last released	Average UK viewers (in millions)	Location
1	3	3 January 2011	5 January 2011	3.35	Jodrell Bank Observatory
2	3	16 January 2012	18 January 2012	3.40	Jodrell Bank Observatory
3	3	8 January 2013	10 January 2013	2.33	Jodrell Bank Observatory
4	3	7 January 2014	9 January 2014	2.78	Jodrell Bank Observatory
5	4	18 March 2015	20 March 2015	2.75	Jodrell Bank Observatory
Specials	2	15 December 2015		N/A	Science Museum, London
6	4	12 January 2016	15 January 2016	1.58	Jodrell Bank Observatory
7	3	28 March 2017	30 March 2017	1.64	Siding Spring Observatory
Special	1	15 July 2019		N/A	Kennedy Space Center

=== Series 1 (2011) ===
Episode	Aired	Topic	Episode summary
1x01	3 January 2011	Jupiter	Jonathan Ross is shown how to use a telescope, Brian Cox explains why planets are spheres, Hawaii becomes home to Liz Bonnin, who talks about Mars and Mark Thompson gives tips on how to take brilliant night photographs.
1x02	4 January 2011	The Sun	Liz Bonnin shows images of the Sun and talks about blackouts from CMEs, Brian Cox explains how to know where every planet will be at a certain time. The presenters talk about Andromeda Galaxy and interview Professor Donald Kurtz who records the sounds of Space.
1x03	5 January 2011	Meteors	Brian Cox talks to the astronauts on board the International Space Station, Mark Thompson gives amateur stargazers a chance to watch the Quadrantid Meteor Shower, Liz Bonnin looks at night skies from Hawaii, Dara Ó Briain goes on top of the Lovell Telescope at their HQ in Jodrell Bank Observatory and tries to experience what an astronaut does.

=== Series 2 (2012) ===
Each episode of this series was immediately followed by Stargazing Live: Back to Earth, in which Brian, Dara and their guests discuss the subjects raised in the main show.

Episode	Aired	Topic	Episode Summary
2x01	16 January 2012	The Moon	Brian Cox and Dara Ó Briain speak to commander of the Apollo 17 mission Eugene Cernan, Mark Thompson presents a guide to show which telescopes amateurs should use, Liz Bonnin is at SALT in South Africa, and viewers are given the chance to find their own exo-planets.
2x02	17 January 2012	Black holes	Brian Cox explains how black holes are formed, Liz Bonnin is at SALT in South Africa, Mark Thompson takes four budding astronomers from the light polluted skies of London to a dark spot, Dara Ó Briain explains the live switch off, UFOs are explained and the team from the university run an animation to show the beginning of the Universe.
2x03	18 January 2012	Aliens	The team hunt for aliens, viewers discover a new planet, Dara Ó Briain and Brian Cox hear the sound of a far off object, Mark Thompson convinces a whole town to switch off their lights live, Liz Bonnin shows off South African telescopes, information about mankind deep in space is explained and Dara Ó Briain hears music from the Universe.

=== Series 3 (2013) ===
As with Series 2, each episode was followed by Stargazing Live: Back to Earth.

Episode	Aired	Topic	Episode Summary
3x01	8 January 2013	Mars Exploration	Dara Ó Briain and Professor Brian Cox celebrate our amazing night sky. They kick things off with the search for evidence of life on Mars and ask viewers for help to explore an uncharted area of the red planet's surface. Liz Bonnin reports live from NASA mission control to find out the latest findings of the Curiosity Rover, whilst Mark Thompson offers tips on how to observe the moons of Jupiter.
3x02	9 January 2013	Deep Space	Dara and Brian's journey through the night sky continues with a look into the distant past, explaining how it is possible to chart the history of the universe by looking million of light years out into the depths of space. Meanwhile, Mark Thompson reveals what can be learned from the colours of the stars. At NASA, Liz Bonnin meets the team building the largest space telescope in the world, an instrument that's 100 times more powerful than the Hubble.
3x03	10 January 2013	Meteors, Asteroids & Comets	On the final night of their astronomical adventure, Brian and Dara discuss meteors, comets and asteroids and reveal how studying them reveals information about the origins of life on Earth. Meanwhile, Liz Bonnin meets the NASA team tasked with tracking any space objects on a collision course with Earth. The results of the experiment carried out by the Stargazing viewers – to explore an uncharted area on the surface of Mars – are also revealed.

=== Series 4 (2014) ===
As with Series 2 and 3, each episode was followed by Stargazing Live: Back to Earth.

Episode	Aired	Topic	Episode Summary
4x01	7 January 2014	Aurora Hunting	Dara Ó Briain and Professor Brian Cox explain how activity on the Sun distorts the Earth's magnetic field and creates the aurorae. The show coincided with a large coronal mass ejection which resulted in a spectacular display on the third night of the series. Liz Bonnin is in Tromso, Norway showing live pictures of the aurora. Mark Thompson is in Norfolk with the local astronomical societies. Carolyn Porco, head of the Cassini mission imaging team, is a guest at Jodrell Bank and they show Cassini movies of aurorae on Saturn. Viewers are invited to participate in examining 40,000 images of galaxies to identify galaxies which gravitationally lens light from far distant galaxies behind them – the aim was for 500,000 images to be examined in two days; in fact this target was met before the end of that evenings' "Stargazing Live: Back to Earth"!
4x02	8 January 2014	Space exploration	Dara and Brian are thrilled to have two of their heroes as guests tonight – Commander Walter Cunningham of Apollo 7, and Commander Chris Hadfield, former commander of the International Space Station. Liz Bonnin takes to the air to view the aurora from 30,000 feet, above the clouds in Norway. Mark Thompson explains how to view satellites in space from Earth. Dara experiences weightlessness on a "vomit comet" aircraft flight.
4x03	9 January 2014	Gravitational lenses & Galaxies	The search for hidden galaxies started on the first night has been extremely successful – more than 50 gravitational lenses were discovered in two days, and some of the world's largest telescopes have been tasked with verifying viewers' discoveries. Brian explains how we work out what the shape of our Galaxy looks like. Dara endures the G-forces experienced by astronauts during a launch in a training centrifuge. Mark Thompson demonstrates how to navigate a boat across the English Channel only using the stars. There is a discussion on exoplanets.

=== Series 5 (2015) ===
Stargazing Live 2015 was broadcast on 18, 19 and 20 March to coincide with the Solar eclipse of Friday 20 March 2015 which – cloud permitting – was visible across much of Britain. The eclipse is comparable with the 1999 Solar Eclipse in the northernmost parts of Britain and will be the last total solar eclipse visible in Europe until 12 August 2026.

Episode	Aired	Topic	Episode Summary
5x01	18 March 2015	The Moon	Dara Ó Briain and Professor Brian Cox discuss the Apollo missions with Buzz Aldrin, Dallas Campbell tests a telerobotic prototype at the European Space Research and Technology Centre (ESTEC), Joseph Gutheinz discusses stolen and missing Moon rocks and Lucie Green presents a guide to things viewers can observe on the surface of the Moon.
5x02	19 March 2015	Solar eclipse	Brian Cox and Dara Ó Briain are joined by Buzz Aldrin and Dr Matt Taylor, who discuss the European Space Agency's Rosetta mission after last year's groundbreaking touchdown on comet 67P. Dara also investigates whether asteroid mining may be possible in the future. Liz Bonnin reports from the Faroe Islands and explains how the solar eclipse will be filmed from above the clouds in an airplane.
5x03a	20 March 2015 (morning)	Solar eclipse	Live coverage of the solar eclipse from Brian Cox and Dara Ó Briain. Liz Bonnin beams live pictures of the eclipse from a specially equipped plane. Chris Hollins is in the Faroe Islands to witness a total solar eclipse. Dr Lucie Green, Leah Boleto and hundreds of children carry out a nationwide experiment to see how the weather changes during the eclipse.
5x03b	20 March 2015 (evening)	Solar eclipse	After the morning's solar eclipse, Brian Cox and Dara Ó Briain show images of the solar eclipse. Brian discusses the latest discoveries and solar secrets of the sun, whilst Liz Bonnin discovers how a new generation of missions to the Sun will fly closer than ever before. Dallas Campbell reports from European Space Agency's spacecraft test centre in the Netherlands to discover how Sun-like conditions can be recreated on Earth.

=== Series 6 (2016) ===
A 6th series of Stargazing Live aired on 12–14 January 2016. Only one Back to Earth episode aired; it was broadcast following the first episode.

Episode	Aired	Topic	Episode Summary
6x01	12 January 2016	Tim Peake, ISS, Pulsars	Tim Peake participates in an interview from the ISS. Brian and Dara test a gyroscope acting upon a garden shed. Liz Bonnin reports about John Bishop, who is participating in his first night of a recreation of Tim Peake's training programme, beginning in the ESA Neutral Buoyancy Facility. NASA scientist Carly Howett joins Dara and Brian to discuss some new images of Pluto, taken by New Horizons. Dara, Brian and Chris Lintott ask for audience help, searching for new pulsars. Lucie Green discusses astronomy and how to photograph the ISS.
6x02	13 January 2016	Tim Peake, ISS	Brian Cox and Dara Ó Briain report on the development of Tim Peake's six-month mission on the ISS and demonstrate the catastrophic impact that ordinary atmospheric pressure can have on a space ship. Liz Bonnin reports from the European Astronaut Centre in Cologne, where John Bishop takes part in tests that astronauts take before going into space.
6x03	14 January 2016	Tim Peake, ISS, Pulsars	Brian Cox and Dara Ó Briain return with further updates on Tim Peake's mission. They explore the technology on the ISS that is used to keep the astronauts safe. Liz Bonnin continues to report from the European Astronaut Centre in Cologne, where John Bishop takes part in tests that astronauts take before going into space. Brian and Dara are joined in the studio by Dame Jocelyn Bell-Burnell, to hear how she discovered the first pulsar star.

=== Series 7 (2017) ===
Series 7 of Stargazing Live aired on 28–30 March 2017. The series focused on stargazing and astronomy in Australia, broadcast live from the Siding Spring Observatory. For the first time, the series was followed by the first series of the Australian version of the show from 4–6 April 2017 on ABC.

Episode	Aired	Topic	Episode Summary
7x01	28 March 2017	Stargazing in the southern hemisphere	Brian Cox, Dara Ó Briain, and Liz Bonnin broadcast live from Australia. Australian amateur astronomer Greg Quicke also joins the presenting team. They report on stargazing in the southern hemisphere and discuss how the stars have influenced Australian culture. Some of the topics include sun lines and Crux (the 'Southern Cross'), which is part of the country's flag. Liz sets out to find a meteor which fell in the Australian bush. Viewers are also told about the effort to find Planet Nine and asked to help find the planet using Zooniverse.
7x02	29 March 2017	Saturn, Great Barrier Reef and the Moon	After the previous episode, stargazing and astronomy in Australia is reported on further. Greg Quicke explains how the moon is linked to the Great Barrier Reef. Despite the stormy weather, Greg and Liz are outside talking about Australian stargazing and show videos recorded earlier in the week. Dara and Brian discuss Saturn's rings and the science behind them. Dara also meets Sethu Vijayakumar to see robots which could be used to prepare Mars for people to travel to.
7x03	30 March 2017	Stargazing in the southern hemisphere, Aliens, black holes	In the final episode of the series, more is reported on stargazing in the southern hemisphere. Brian discusses the black hole that can be found in the centre of the milky way galaxy and explains what a black hole really is. Dara looks into extra-terrestrial life and finds out what is being done to find other intelligent life forms. Liz continues on from Dara to talk about early life on earth and finds evidence hidden in rocks in Australia.

=== Specials ===
Two special episodes of Stargazing Live aired on 15 December 2015 to cover the launch of Tim Peake into space as part of Expedition 46 to the International Space Station. A special aired on 15 January 2016 to celebrate Peake taking his first spacewalk.

Episode	Aired	Topic	Episode Summary
"Blast Off Live"	15 December 2015	Expedition 46 Part 1	The first part of the two-part special that covers the launch of Tim Peake into space as part of Expedition 46 to the International Space Station
"Brit in Space"	15 December 2015	Expedition 46 Part 2	The second part of the two-part special that covers the launch of Tim Peake into space as part of Expedition 46 to the International Space Station
"The Spacewalk"	15 January 2016		Highlights from that day's spacewalk featuring Tim Peake, the first spacewalk performed by a British astronaut, with studio guest Chris Hadfield.
