= The What in the World? Quiz =

- Also known as: What on Earth?
- Written by: Mark Cohen; Adam Bostock-Smith; Chris Heath
- Directed by: Derek Wheeler
- Presented by: Marcus Brigstocke
- Starring: Lee Hurst; Dominic Holland
- Country of origin: United Kingdom
- No. of series: 1
- No. of episodes: 10

Production
- Producer: Neil Gallery
- Running time: 30 minutes
- Production company: Shine TV

Original release
- Network: 5
- Release: 5 September 2008 – 11 December 2009

The What in the World? Quiz is a British comedy panel game first broadcast on 5 September 2008 on Five. The show is hosted by Marcus Brigstocke and guest stars Lee Hurst and Dominic Holland as the team captains. The show asks questions themed on science and technology. The guests on the show are scientists and academic experts. After the first three episodes, the rest of the series was indefinitely postponed.

== Rounds ==
The What in the World? Quiz is split into four different rounds.

1) World of Extremes: The panel are given three different things and have to guess which is the most extreme. For example, which of the three things is the fastest, the slowest or the most deadly. An award of 2 points is given for a right answer. If one side is wrong, the question goes to the other side for 1 point.

2) Time Bomb: The panel are presented with three different situations (The "Time Bombs"), each of which takes a different length of time. One side chooses which situation they think is the quickest. The other side then are asked rapid-fire questions (2 points each) for the length of the time of the situation chosen. For example, if the event takes 42 seconds to complete, they have 42 seconds to answer as many questions as possible.

3) Experimental: In this round, a team of scientists from Cambridge University called "The Naked Scientists" perform a scientific experiment. The panel then draw what they think will happen during the experiment. The panel are given up to 5 points depending on how accurate their drawing is, as judged by Brigstocke.

4) Factoid Frenzy: The panel are shown a video montage which contains a range of different facts. The panel have to try and remember as many facts as they can possibly can. After the video, the panel are all asked questions, the answers to which were all in the video. Right answers are awarded 3 points, while wrong answers result in a deduction of 3 points.

== Reception ==
The programme has received a mixed reception. The Daily Mirror wrote that, "While many of us moan about TV dumbing down, attempts like this to dumb-up, as it were, leave you confused about whether to start laughing or cramming."

However, the website UKGameShows.com were more critical, in particular of the "Factoid Frenzy" round. They said: "After being a quite tedious film of facts to remember, which takes the people off the screen and therefore is not the least bit entertaining, the teams buzz in to answer fairly straightforward questions on what they've just seen. It's not that clever and not that funny."

They also attacked the way the show was made saying, "its so dark that it looks like it's being lit by a bumper pack of IKEA tea lights. Most annoyingly, the added-after-the-event scoring box shown during the final round is in tiny writing, and, in a spectacularly bad bit of planning, clashes with the Five channel bug. Well done, lads!"
