= Institute of Biology =

UK professional body

The Institute of Biology (IoB) was a professional body for biologists, primarily those working in the United Kingdom. The Institute was founded in 1950 by the Biological Council: the then umbrella body for Britain's many learned biological societies. Its individual membership (as opposed to the individual membership of its affiliates) quickly grew; in the late 1990s it was as high as 16,000 but declined in the early 21st century to 11,000. It received a Royal Charter in 1979 and it held charitable status. The IoB was not a trade union, nor did it have the regulatory power over its membership (like the General Medical Council) although it did have the right to remove a member's Chartered status and was empowered by its Royal Charter to represent Britain's profession of biology. In October 2009, the IoB was merged with the Biosciences Federation (BSF) to form the Society of Biology, which has around 14,000 individual members and over 90 member organisations. In May 2015, the Society was granted permission to become the Royal Society of Biology.

== Role of the Institute ==
As the professional body representing biologists, the IoB was frequently consulted on biological issues by Government, Parliament, industry and other organisations. Due to its widespread members and affiliated societies, it prided itself on producing a balanced response that reflected the views of the biological profession as a whole. At its peak of policy activity in the late 1990s the Institute was each year responding to over 40 consultations and organising half a dozen policy events and workshops in addition to its usual committee meetings. Topics addressed were wide and varied, for example including relating to: agricultural research, AIDS, antibiotic resistance, alternative medicine regulation, bioethics, biodiversity, biotechnology, careers in biology (both for school leavers and at the research level), climate change, GMOs, public understanding of science, national park formation, renewable energy impact, research assessment, safety in biological fieldwork, safety in laboratories, xenotransplantation... among many others.

The Institute's house journal was Biologist, featuring news and book reviews, but mainly overview articles of biological topics. It also produced a specialist journal for biology teachers and university lecturers called the Journal of Biological Education. (The latter journal continues today with the Society of Biology but the former became a magazine—with a changed subtitle The Biologist—in 2011.) In addition to journals it produced symposium proceedings and a range of in-house publications. In the Institute's 50-year history its most popular in-house publication was "Careers with Biology" that ran to several editions and tens of thousands of copies. Other highly successful titles have included "Safety in Biological Fieldwork" (three editions) and "Biological Nomenclature" (four editions). From its second decade through to the end its fourth, the Institute was noted for its co-publishing ventures with commercial academic publishers. In particular its short book series 'Studies in Biology' with Edward Arnold beginning in 1960 ended up at the height of its popularity with 149 titles. This series was then with Cambridge University Press up to 2007. Over the years literally hundreds of thousands of copies from this series have been sold. Other successful publishing ventures in the 1980s and 1990s included those with Unwin Hyman, Chapman & Hall, and Westlake Publishing. In the late 1990s through to 2003 its joint publishing ventures with Hobsons saw bioscience university course guides go each year to every secondary school in the UK.

The Institute regularly organised scientific symposia. These were organised by either its regional branches or by its scientific committees ('divisions') that related to biomedicine, education, agriculture and environment (these last two were merged in 2007). Prior to 2000, these provided the raw material for the aforementioned 'proceedings'. The regional branches also regularly organised other scientific as well as social events and included topics of fundamental research as well as socio-political interest. One example of a then controversial topic was the proceedings arising out of the 1989 symposia 'AIDS: A Challenge in Education' the proceedings of which were jointly published by the Institute with the Royal Society of Medicine so reaching both clinicians, the biological community as well as school teachers.

From 1995 to 2003 the Institute increasingly became the 'Voice of British Biology' (its then strategic goal) following the creation of the Affiliated Societies out of the former Biological Council. Between 1995 and 2003 it responded to over 120 science policy consultations invariably with some informal input from Affiliated Societies and occasionally formally jointly with some of these Affiliated Societies on a wide range of topics. The Institute's Education Department also produced a similar number of responses, again some with Affiliated Societies.

During 2003, the IoB merged with the Biosciences Federation (BSF) re-inventing "a single authority within the life sciences that decision-makers are able to consult for opinion and information to assist the formulation of public policy". The IoB participated in the formation of policy responses and statements with the BSF. For example, the IoB "contributed specific (or specialist) advice" in the formation of the policy statement Climate Change: Looking forward, stating "that climate change is 'the world's greatest environmental challenge'." Additionally, the IoB also communicated policy advice independently of the BSF. For example, in regards to ecosystem services, they promoted, "putting an explicit value on the services that ecosystems contribute to human welfare, including such diverse items as flood protection, pollination, soil formation and aesthetic enjoyment."

== Membership of the Institute ==
Members agreed to uphold standards of professional behaviour contained in the Royal Charter:

"Every member of the Institute shall at all times so order their conduct as to uphold the dignity and reputation of biology and to safeguard the public interest in matters of safety and health and otherwise. They shall exercise professional skill and judgement to the best of their ability and discharge professional responsibilities with integrity."

The IoB offered members a number of benefits, including subscriptions to in-house journals, Journal of Biological Education and The Biologist, its publications, discounts on third party products and services and also discounted use of the meeting facilities at the IoB headquarters in London.

There were several grades of membership, depending upon biological qualifications and experience. Members and Fellows were awarded Chartered Biologist (CBiol) status, the professional qualification for bioscientists. It demonstrated a high level of attainment in biological experience, personal integrity, professional attributes and academic qualifications. In addition to the grades listed below, there were also student, graduate (with the designation GBiol, for degree graduates who did not qualify for CBiol) and associate (for non-academic biologists or academics outside of biology) membership grades.

The IoB awarded qualifications equivalent to honours degrees (Graduateship of the Institute of Biology). The syllabus was taught at technical colleges in the United Kingdom. This offered a route to honours degree level qualifications in biology for students unable to commit to full time higher education. Graduates of the IoB could apply for election to full membership after demonstrating the required level of experience and responsibility in the field of the biological sciences.

=== Membership ===
The Member grade was the main professional grade. Members were professional bioscientists with a standard of academic attainment equivalent to first or second class honours degree level in biological science and with post-graduate responsible experience in biological research or in the teaching or application of biological science. Members were entitled to use the letters C.Biol M.I.Biol

=== Fellowship ===
Fellowship of the Institute of Biologists was the senior professional grade. Bioscientists who had achieved distinction in biological research or the teaching or application of biological science were eligible. Fellows used the designation C.Biol F.I.Biol

== Affiliated societies ==
The Institute was born out of the Biological Council. The Biological Council dissolved in the early 1990s and became the Affiliated Societies: this affiliation enabled the Institute to facilitate what its then President called "the voice of British biology". At their most there were 70 societies in 2002. This biological affiliation enabled issues of common concern (such as research assessment, science funding, career structure, bioethics) to be addressed as well as more specialist issues that affected only a subset of the affiliation.

== Location ==
The headquarters of the Institute was originally located in Tavistock Square in BMA House before moving to larger rented accommodation in Queensgate in Kensington, London, near to the Natural History Museum and Imperial College London. It then bought its own property nearby in 20 Queensberry Place. During the early 1990s it bought the building next door (number 22), merging the two. In 2006, it moved to smaller accommodation in Red Lion Court (near the Royal Courts of Justice).
