= Vivienne Wild =

British astrophysicist

Vivienne Wild is a British astrophysicist, and a professor in the School of Physics and Astronomy at the University of St Andrews. Her research focuses on galaxy formation and evolution including galaxy mergers, starburst galaxies, elliptical galaxies, and galactic halos.

== Education and career ==
Wild received a master's degree in physics, with first-class honours, from the University of Edinburgh in 2002. She went on to graduate study at the University of Cambridge, where she received a Ph.D. in astrophysics in 2005. Her dissertation, Galaxies in redshift surveys – spatial distributions and interstellar dust, was jointly supervised by Paul C. Hewett and Ofer Lahav.

After postdoctoral research at the Max Planck Institute for Astrophysics in Germany, as a Marie Curie Intra-European Fellow at the Institut d'Astrophysique de Paris, and as a research fellow at the University of Edinburgh, she became a lecturer in physics and astronomy at the University of St Andrews in 2012. She was promoted to reader in 2015 and to professor in 2021. She served the school as director of equality and diversity from 2016 to 2019, and as deputy director of post-graduate studies beginning in 2022.

== Recognition ==
Wild was elected as a Fellow of the Royal Society of Edinburgh in 2025.
