= Mark Thompson (astronomer) =

British astronomer and television presenter

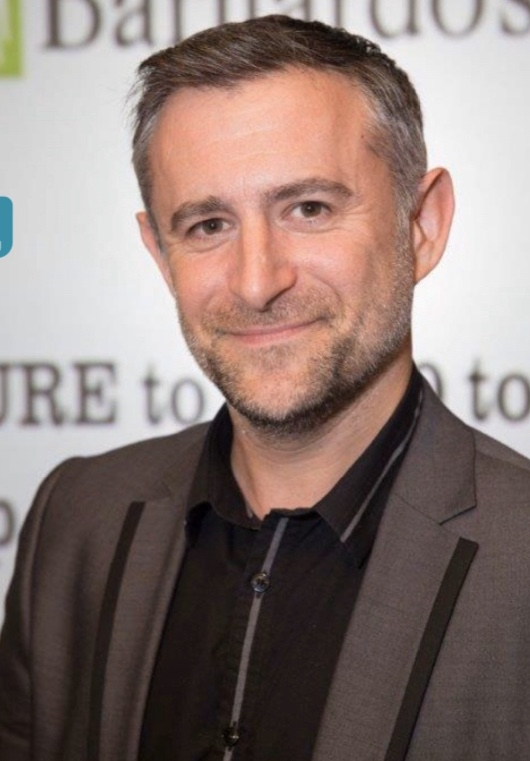
- Born: Mark Thompson; 1973 (age 52–53); Norfolk, England
- Occupations: Astronomer, television presenter, and writer

Mark Thompson (born 1973, Norfolk, England) is a British astronomer, television presenter and writer best known for being one of the presenting team on the BBC show Stargazing Live and is a regular face on Good Morning Britain.

== Biography ==
Thompson has lived in Norfolk all his life and was first enthused about astronomy aged 10 when he saw the rings of Saturn through a telescope. He has remained living in the county because the night skies are very dark and ideal for stargazing.

Thompson had given up his ambition to present on TV and left insurers Aviva to retrain as a pilot when (in 2009) he was picked to become a presenter on the BBC's The One Show. where he lived at Wortwell, near Harleston.

Thompson has been one of a number of amateur astronomers to become a council member of the Royal Astronomical Society. Since it was founded in 1820 as the Astronomical Society of London (receiving its Royal Charter in 1830 from King William IV) it has had many amateurs on its council, including many of its founding members (of the original 12 founding members in 1820, 11 were amateurs, including the Sir John Herschel, the son of William). Nigel Calder and Anthony Kinder, both amateurs, were members of the council from 2001–2004. He is President of the Norwich Astronomical Society.

He is most well known for his role as one of the presenting team of the hit BBC science show Stargazing Live.

In August 2016 Thompson first performed his Spectacular Science Show at the Edinburgh Festival Fringe at the National Museum of Scotland Gilded Balloon venue., he has been touring it around the country to sellout audiences since.

Thompson was awarded an Honorary Doctorate from the University of East Anglia on 16 July 2018.

== TV appearances and radio broadcasts ==
- Presenter of astronomy/science items for The One Show Jul 2009 to Oct 2011
- Presenter of Stargazing Live Jan 2011 to present
- Specialist Presenter on the Alan Titchmarsh Show Jan 2012 to 2014
- Guest on The Wright Stuff 12 Jan 2012
- Monthly Night Sky segment on BBC Radio 5 Live Jan 2012 to present
- Derren Brown's Apocalypse episode 1 in Oct 2012
- Celebrity Mastermind Contestant 5 Jan 2013
- Regular guest on This Morning March 2014 to 2018
- Guest appearances on Good Morning Britain 2018 to present day
- Contestant on Pointless Celebrities 7 September 2019

== Written work ==
- Columnist for Discovery Space Jul 2010 to present
- Writer for Space Exploration Network Jul 2011 to 2012
- 'A Down to Earth Guide to the Cosmos' ISBN 978-0593070369
- 'A Space Travellers Guide to the Solar System' ISBN 978-0593073339
- 'Philips Stargazing with Mark Thompson' ISBN 978-1849073134
- 'Philips Astrophotography with Mark Thompson' ISBN 978-1849073141
- 'Science for Rocketing into Space' ISBN 978-1526308108
- 'Science for Looking Into Space' ISBN 978-1526308474
- 'Science for Exploring Outer Space' ISBN 978-1526308467
- 'Science for Surviving in Space' ISBN 978-1526308436
- '101 Facts You Didn't Know About Space' ISBN 978-1526744579
