= Becky Smethurst =

British astrophysicist

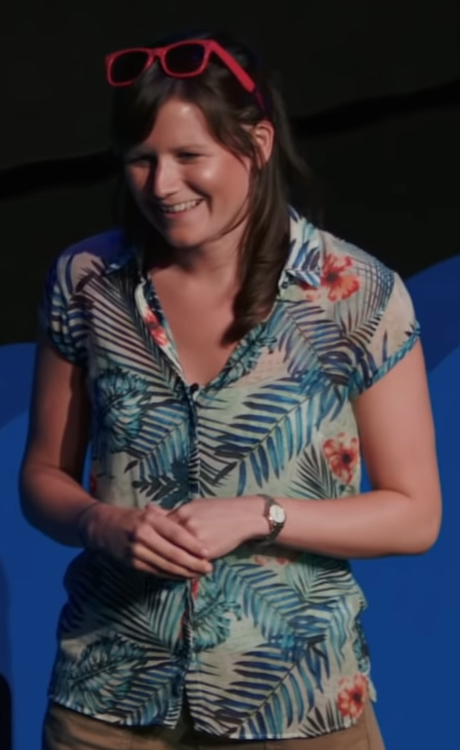
- Smethurst in 2014
- Born: Rebecca Jane Smethurst; 15 May 1990 (age 36)
- Citizenship: British
- Education: Bolton School Girls' Division; University of Durham (MPhys); University of Oxford (DPhil)
- Known for: A Brief History of Black Holes
- Awards: Caroline Herschel Prize (2020); Mary Somerville Medal (2020)
- Scientific career
- Fields: Supermassive black hole evolution
- Workplaces: Christ Church, University of Oxford; University of Nottingham
- Thesis: The influence of morphology, AGN and environment on the quenching histories of galaxies (2017)
- Doctoral advisor: Chris Lintott

YouTube information
- Channel: Dr. Becky
- Years active: 2015–present
- Genres: Science outreach (astronomy and astrophysics)
- Subscribers: 884 thousand
- Views: 120 million
- Last updated: 9 October 2026
- Website: rebeccasmethurst.co.uk

Rebecca Smethurst, also known as Dr. Becky, is a British astrophysicist, author, and YouTuber who is a Royal Astronomical Society Research Fellow at the University of Oxford. She was the recipient of the 2020 Caroline Herschel Prize Lectureship, awarded by the Royal Astronomical Society, as well as the 2020 Mary Somerville Medal and Prize, awarded by the Institute of Physics. In 2022, she won the Royal Astronomical Society's Winton Award "for research by a post-doctoral fellow in Astronomy whose career has shown the most promising development".

As a researcher, Smethurst studies the role that supermassive black holes play in inhibiting different types of galaxies from forming stars. She is a member of the Galaxy Zoo collaboration, run by her doctoral advisor, Chris Lintott. Smethurst hosts her own YouTube channel, called Dr. Becky, where she posts science communication videos related to astronomy research and amateur astronomy. She has also written two popular science books, titled Space: 10 Things You Should Know and A Brief History of Black Holes.

== Early life and education ==
While growing up, Smethurst attended the Bolton School Girls' Division for a decade, from 1998 through 2008. She received a first-class master's degree in physics and astronomy from the University of Durham in 2012. After taking a year off from academic studies, Smethurst began pursuing a doctoral degree at the University of Oxford, with Chris Lintott as her supervisor. She earned her doctorate in 2017 with a thesis titled "The influence of morphology, AGN and environment on the quenching histories of galaxies".

== Academic career ==
Smethurst was an Ogden Trust Research Fellow at the University of Nottingham before returning to the University of Oxford in late 2018 as a junior research fellow. She studies the interaction between galaxies and the supermassive black holes at their centres, specifically focusing on if and how these black holes can quench the process of star formation in their surrounding galaxies. Her research involves using statistical methods to analyse large datasets of galaxies obtained through Galaxy Zoo and the Sloan Digital Sky Survey, including the development of several open-source software programs for analytics of large astronomy data sets.

One of her research findings is showing that galaxies in the green valley that do not fit in with normal red elliptical or blue spiral galaxies can be used as a means to probe how and when star formation quenching occurs. Smethurst won the 2020 Caroline Herschel Prize Lectureship, an award given by the Herschel Society through the Royal Astronomical Society, with the goal of "supporting promising female astronomers early in their careers".

== Science communication ==
Smethurst began creating science communication videos when she was a postdoctoral fellow at the University of Nottingham for the Sixty Symbols YouTube channel, run by Brady Haran and the university's physics department. She also has appeared on Deep Sky Videos, another channel operated by Haran on the theme of astronomy. Smethurst launched her own YouTube channel, eponymously titled Dr. Becky, in late 2018, on which she posts weekly videos related primarily to astronomy research and occasionally on amateur astronomy. These include a monthly series called Night Sky News, in which she discusses events amateurs might observe in the night sky during the month, as well as recent research developments in astronomy. She has also published a book, titled Space: 10 Things You Should Know, which was named one of Sky at Night Magazine's 23 best space and astronomy books of 2019.

Smethurst received the 2020 Mary Somerville Medal and Prize, an award given "for exceptional early career contributions to public engagement in physics", winning specifically for "engaging a diverse, global audience with complex astrophysical ideas presented at an accessible level with a large dose of enthusiasm on the YouTube channel Dr. Becky". Smethurst hosts The Supermassive Podcast together with journalist Izzie Clarke. The show, produced by the Royal Astronomical Society focuses on astronomy and related research.

== Personal life ==
In July 2025, Smethurst revealed that she had been diagnosed with early-stage breast cancer.

In May 2026, Smethurst married her partner Sam.
