= Greg Quicke =

Australian amateur astronomer, astronomy tour operator and author (1961–2024)

Greg Quicke (1961 – 7 June 2024) was an Australian amateur astronomer, astronomy tour operator and author who became known from his appearances on the Australian Broadcasting Corporation (ABC) and British Broadcasting Corporation (BBC) Stargazing Live TV specials, beginning in April 2017. He was nicknamed 'Space Gandalf'.

Quicke also had his own television series on Australia's ABC, the ten part A Stargazer's Guide to the Cosmos.

After being diagnosed with cancer in 2023 Quicke died on 7 June 2024, at the age of 62.
