= Chris Lintott =

British astrophysicist, author and broadcaster (born 1980)

Chris Lintott FRAS
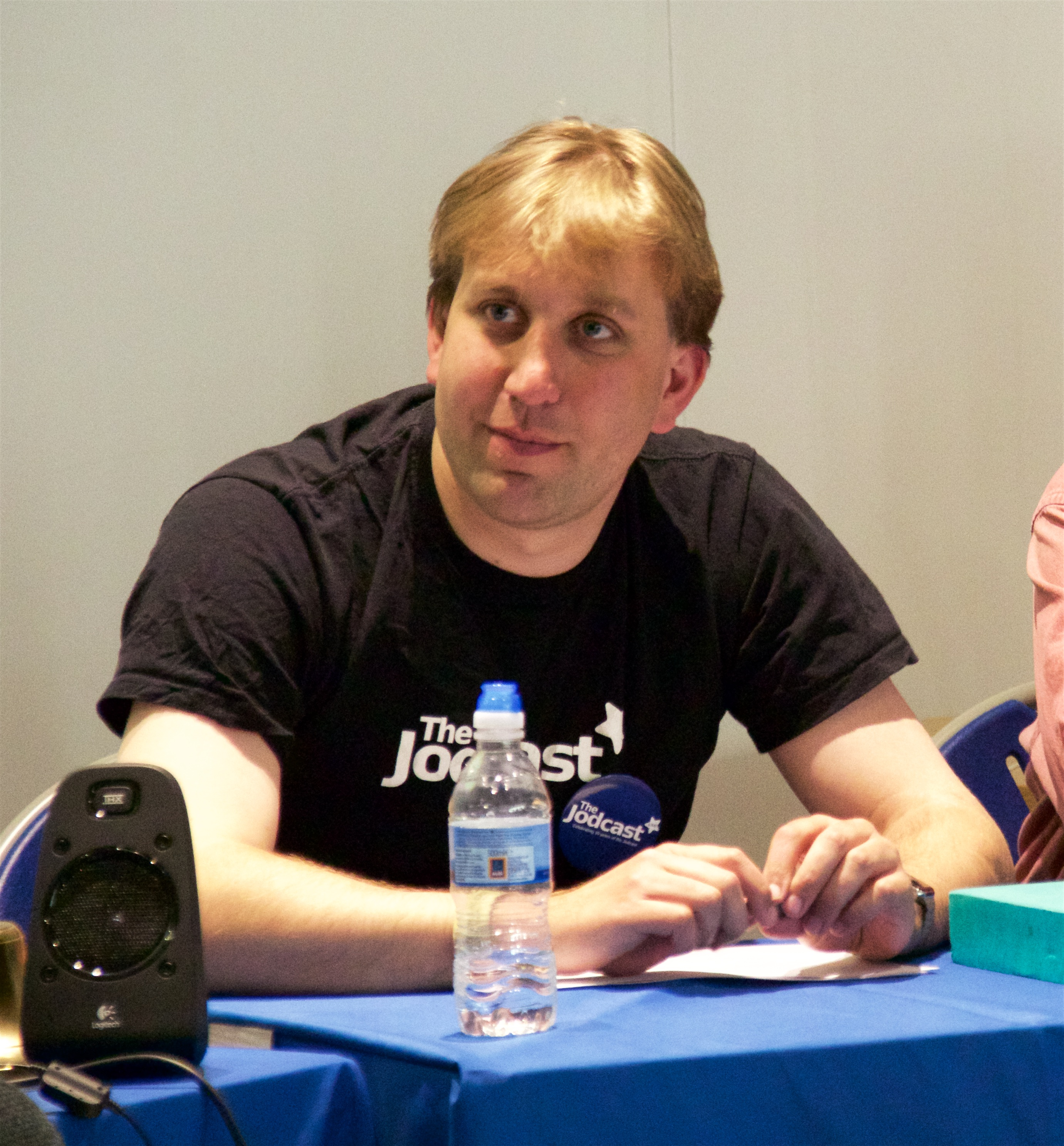
- Chris Lintott at Jodcast Live 2016, at Jodrell Bank Observatory, UK.
- Born: Christopher John Lintott; 26 November 1980 (age 45); Torbay, Devon, England
- Education: Torquay Boys' Grammar School
- Alma mater: Magdalene College, Cambridge (BA); University College London (PhD)
- Known for: The Sky at Night; Galaxy Zoo
- Awards: Beatrice Tinsley Prize (2014); Kohn Award (2011)
- Scientific career
- Workplaces: Gresham College; University of Oxford; Somerville College, Oxford; University College London; Adler Planetarium & Astronomy Museum; University of Cambridge
- Thesis: Analyses of the early stages of star formation (2006)
- Doctoral advisor: Ofer Lahav; Jonathan Rawlings
- Doctoral students: Becky Smethurst
- Website: Official website

Christopher John Lintott FRAS (born 26 November 1980) is a British astrophysicist, author and broadcaster. He is a Professor of Astrophysics in the Department of Physics at the University of Oxford, and, since 2023, Gresham Professor of Astronomy at Gresham College, London. Lintott is involved in a number of popular science projects aimed at bringing astronomy to a wider audience and is also the primary presenter of the BBC television series The Sky at Night, having previously been co-presenter with Patrick Moore until Moore's death in 2012. He co-authored Bang! – The Complete History of the Universe and The Cosmic Tourist with Moore and Queen guitarist and astrophysicist Brian May.

== Education ==
Lintott attended Torquay Boys' Grammar School in Devon. In 1999, while still at school, he won a $500 Earth and Space Sciences award and the Priscilla and Bart Bok Honorable Mention Award at the Intel International Science and Engineering Fair for an article on 'Cosmic dust around young stellar objects'. This came from a six-week project at the University of Hertfordshire funded by a Nuffield bursary. He read Natural Sciences at Magdalene College, Cambridge, and in 2006 received a PhD degree in astrophysics from University College London, for his thesis on the early stages of star formation, supervised by Ofer Lahav.

== Research and career ==
As of 2017 Lintott is co-director of the Programme on Computational Cosmology and Citizen Science Project Lead in the Department of Physics at the University of Oxford, and a Research Fellow at New College, Oxford. He was the Director of Citizen Science Initiatives at the Adler Planetarium in Chicago from 2010 until 2012.

His research focuses on galaxy evolution and the application of astrochemical models of star formation to galaxies beyond the Milky Way; particularly the use of sulphur compounds as a signature of stars that are in the process of formation. After a recommendation from Ed Vaizey, former Culture Minister, Prime Minister David Cameron appointed Lintott as Astronomy Trustee of the National Maritime Museum (NMM). His appointment ran from 24 June 2010 until 23 June 2014.

Lintott's research has been published in a wide variety of peer-reviewed scientific journals. He was a Fulford junior research fellow at Somerville College, Oxford between 2006 and 2010.

Lintott's research has been funded by the Engineering and Physical Sciences Research Council (EPSRC), the Arts and Humanities Research Council (AHRC) and the Science and Technology Facilities Council (STFC).

=== The Sky at Night ===
Lintott first appeared on the BBC astronomy programme The Sky at Night, presented by Patrick Moore, as a guest in 2000. As Moore's mobility deteriorated, Lintott acquired an increasingly prominent role, often providing on-location reporting from events covered by the programme. In an interview in 2007 with Mark Lawson, Moore described him as "eminently suitable" as a presenter. He jointly presented the programme with Moore until the latter's death in December 2012. Since the February 2013 episode, Chris Lintott has been a co-presenter with Lucie Green (until December 2013) and with Maggie Aderin-Pocock (since February 2014). In July 2004, Moore suffered a near-fatal bout of food poisoning and Lintott stood in as the sole presenter of that month's episode. It was the only episode which Moore did not present since the show was first broadcast on 24 April 1957 until his death.

=== Galaxy Zoo and The Zooniverse ===
Lintott is the co-founder, along with Kevin Schawinski, of Galaxy Zoo, an online crowdsourcing project where members of the public can volunteer their time to assist in classifying over a million galaxies.(e.g.) Lintott stated when commenting on GZ: "One advantage is that you get to see parts of space that have never been seen before. These images were taken by a robotic telescope and processed automatically, so the odds are that when you log on, that first galaxy you see will be one that no human has seen before." This was confirmed by Schawinski: "Most of these galaxies have been photographed by a robotic telescope, and then processed by computer. So this is the first time they will have been seen by human eyes."

Lintott was the principal investigator (P.I.) of the Zooniverse citizen science platform for over 15 years. Quoting from the Zooniverse Team page: "Astronomer and founder of both Galaxy Zoo and the Zooniverse that grew from it, Chris is interested in how galaxies form and evolve, how citizen science can change the world". Lintott is also the chair of the Citizen Science Alliance, the organisation that produces, maintains and develops The Zooniverse.

=== Books ===
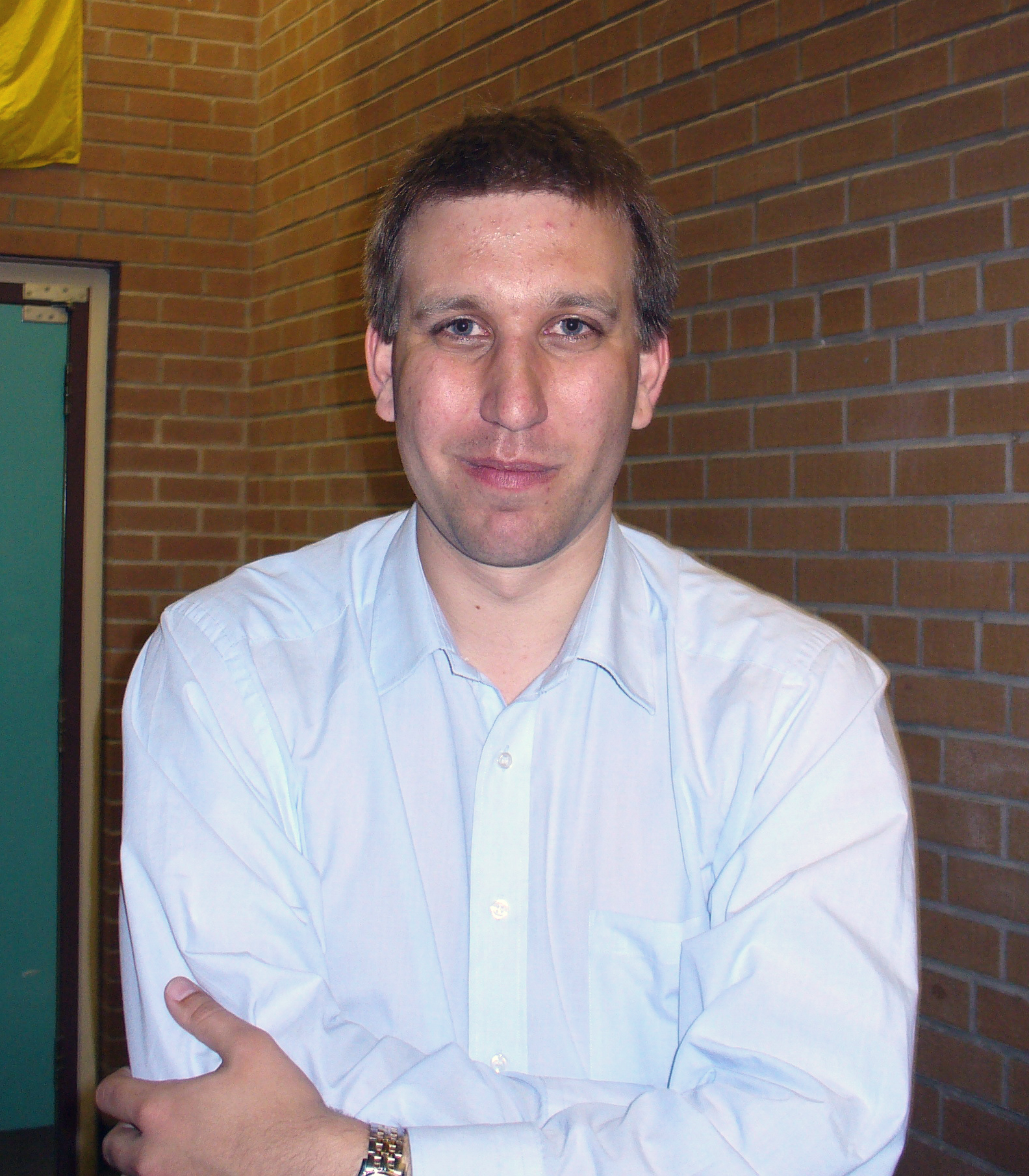
Lintott after a lecture for the Perimeter Institute for Theoretical Physics in Waterloo, Ontario in April 2010

In October 2006, Lintott, Patrick Moore and Brian May co-authored a book entitled Bang! – The Complete History of the Universe, which was produced by Canopus Books and published by Carlton Books on 23 October 2006. It has been translated into 13 languages and has appeared in paperback. As suggested by the title, the illustrated book is a history of the Universe from the Big Bang to its eventual predicted end. It is aimed at a popular science audience and claims to make its subject matter easily comprehensible to readers without any knowledge of astronomy.

In October 2012, Lintott, Moore and May co-authored a book entitled The Cosmic Tourist: The 100 Most Awe-inspiring Destinations in the Universe. On the book's PR page, it is stated: "Take your seats for the greatest tour ever – one that encompasses no less than the whole of the Universe."

Lintott's book, The Crowd and the Cosmos: Adventures in the Zooniverse was released in 2019.

=== Awards and honours ===
Lintott is a Fellow of the Royal Astronomical Society. In 2011, Lintott was awarded the Royal Society Kohn Award. He was awarded this (quoting from the Royal Society webpage): "For his excellent engagement with society in matters of science and its societal dimension."

In 2013, Lintott was awarded the Oxford Internet Institute Internet and Society Award. He was given this (quoting from the OII website): "in recognition of Galaxy Zoo's outstanding contributions to research by using crowd-sourced citizen science to capitalise on the availability of online big data-sets."

In 2014, he received the Beatrice M. Tinsley Prize from the American Astronomical Society. He was awarded this (quoting from the AAS website): "For his insight and creativity that created a transformative approach to science by engaging nonscientists in cutting edge research."

In 2015, he won the Institute of Physics Kelvin Medal and Prize. In 2020 he was elected a Legacy Fellow of the American Astronomical Society.

=== Real Tennis ===
Lintott is a fan and player of the game of real tennis, where he represents the Oxford University Tennis Club. In 2022, Lintott provided commentary for the broadcast of the 2022 Real Tennis World Championship at Prested Hall in Feering, Essex. In 2023, he also provided commentary for the finals of the 2023 Ladies World Championship.

== Bibliography ==
- Bang! – The Complete History of the Universe, 2006, ISBN 978-0-801-88985-1
- The Cosmic Tourist: The 100 Most Awe-inspiring Destinations in the Universe, 2012, ISBN 978-1-847-32619-5
- The Crowd and the Cosmos: Adventures in the Zooniverse, 2019, ISBN 978-0-198-84222-4
- Our Accidental Universe: Stories of Discovery from Asteroids to Aliens, 2024, ISBN 978-1-911-70918-3
