= Ofer Lahav =

Israeli-British astronomer

Ofer Lahav FRAS FInstP MAE
- עופר להב
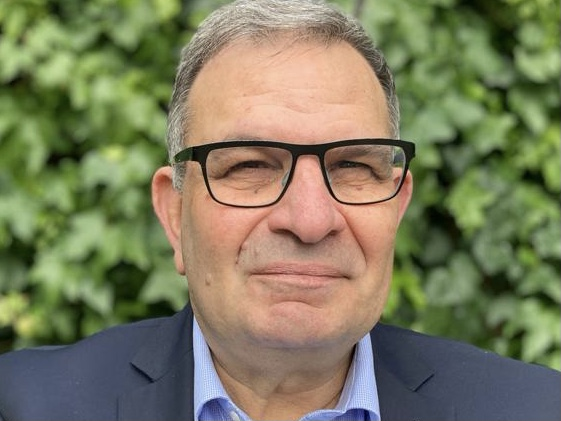
- Lahav in 2021
- Born: 5 April 1959 (age 67); Tiberias, Israel
- Citizenship: Dual Israeli-British
- Awards: Fred Hoyle Medel and Prize, Institute of Physics (2026); George Darwin Lecture, Royal Astronomical Society (2020); George Whitrow Lecture, Royal Astronomical Society (2014); Royal Society Wolfson Research Merit Award (2008–2013)
- Scientific career
- Fields: Observational Cosmology; Dark energy; Cosmological probes of Dark Matter and Dark Energy; Large spectroscopic and photometric redshift surveys; Neutrino Cosmology; Formation and evolution of galaxies; Statistical methods
- Workplaces: University College London; University of Cambridge; Ben-Gurion University; Tel Aviv University
- Thesis: Anisotropies in the Local Universe (1988)
- Doctoral advisor: George Efstathiou; Donald Lynden-Bell
- Other academic advisors: Jacob Bekenstein
- Doctoral students: Chris Lintott; Vivienne Wild
- Website: www.ucl.ac.uk/astrophysics/professor-ofer-lahav

Ofer Lahav (Hebrew: עופר להב) FRAS FInstP MAE is the Perren Chair of Astronomy at University College London (UCL), His research area is Observational Cosmology, in particular probing Dark Matter and Dark Energy. His work involves Machine Learning and Artificial Intelligence (AI).

He was a member of the academi staff at the Institute of Astronomy (1990–2003) and a Fellow of St Catharine's College, Cambridge (1988-2004). Lahav served as the UCL Head of Astrophysics (2004–2011), Vice-Dean (Research) (2011-2015) and Vice-Dean (International) (2020-2026) of the UCL Faculty of Mathematical and Physical Sciences (MAPS) and Co-Director of the STFC Centre for Doctoral Training in Data Intensive Science.

Lahav was Vice-President of the Royal Astronomical Society (2010–2012). He is one of the founders of the Dark Energy Survey (DES), and he co-chaired the international DES Science Committee from inception until 2016. He chaired both the DES:UK and DESI:UK consortia. He previously served as a member of the STFC Science Board (2016–2019). From 2012 to 2018, Lahav held a European Research Council (ERC) Advanced Grant on "Testing the Dark Energy Paradigm".

He is the lead editor of the book The Dark Energy Survey: The Story of a Cosmological Experiment (World Scientific, 2020).

Hie was a Visiting Fellow at All Souls College Oxford, and he is a Visiting Professor at the University of Oxford and a Fellow of Goodenough College.

He was awarded the 2026 Institute of Physics Fred Hoyle Medal and Prize: "Ofer Lahav pioneered AI for Astronomy from the early 1990s. His scientific leadership in developing and exploiting the now completed Dark Energy Survey has delivered major advances in precision Cosmology."

== Education ==
Lahav studied physics at Tel-Aviv University (BSc, 1980), physics at Ben-Gurion University (MSc, 1985) and earned his PhD (1988) in astronomy from the University of Cambridge,

== Research ==
Lahav's research is focused on cosmological probes of Dark Matter and Dark Energy, in particular large galaxy surveys. Lahav has co-authored over 650 research articles in peer reviewed scientific journals. His h-index is 164 (September 2026).

He supervised approximately 30 PhD students and 30 postdoctoral researchers.
