= Kohn Award =

The Royal Society Kohn Award was an award given by the Royal Society since 2005 to beginning scientists who had achieved significant cultural impact through broadcasting or public speech. It was funded by the Kohn Foundation (set up by Ralph Kohn) and consisted of a grant for £7,500 for science communication activities and a gift of £2,500.

== Past winners ==
- 2013 Peter Vukusic
- 2012 Suzannah Lishman
- 2011 Christopher Lintott
- 2010 No Award
- 2009 Lucie Green
- 2008 Chris Smith
- 2007 Carolyn Stephens
- 2006 Kathy Sykes
- 2005 Colin Pulham
