= Royal Society of Biology =

British learned society

- Official logo
- Abbreviation: RSB
- Predecessor: Institute of Biology, Society of Biology and the Biosciences Federation
- Formation: 2009
- Type: Learned society and Professional association
- Headquarters: London, UK
- Location: Postal address: PO Box 33, 95 Mortimer Street, London W1W 7GB
- Members: 20,000+ individual members and almost 100 Member Organisations
- Official language: English
- President: Prof Dame Melanie Welham
- Chief Executive: Dr Doug Brown FRSB
- Website: www.rsb.org.uk
- Remarks: Motto: Scientiam Vitae Propagare (To Expand the Science of Life)
- Formerly called: Society of Biology

Coat of arms of the Royal Society of Biology

The Royal Society of Biology (RSB), previously called the Society of Biology, is a learned society and professional association in the United Kingdom created to advance the interests of biology in academia, industry, education, and research. Formed in 2009 by the merger of the Biosciences Federation and the Institute of Biology, the society has more than 20,000 individual members, and almost 100 Member Organisations. In addition to engaging the public on matters related to the life sciences, the Society seeks to develop the profession and to guide the development of related policies.

Individual Membership is open to both professional biologists and non-professional individuals with an interest in the life sciences, reflecting the Society’s inclusive and diverse community.

== Organisation ==
In May 2015, the society, previously called the Society of Biology, was granted permission to become the "Royal Society of Biology". The society is also a registered charity.

The first president of the society was Professor Dame Nancy Rothwell (University of Manchester); the current president is Professor Sir Ian L. Boyd.

The Royal Society of Biology supports university students and early-career researchers with careers advice, travel grants and careers days. In 2012, it developed a Degree Accreditation Programme to promote high standards in the biosciences and highlight degrees which provide graduates with the skills required for academic and industry careers.

=== Fellows of the Royal Society of Biology ===
Notable Fellows and Honorary Fellows include Sir David Attenborough, Professor Sue Black, Dr Roger Highfield, Professor Alec Jeffreys, Sir Paul Nurse, Dr George McGavin, Professor Venki Ramakristhnan, and Professor Alice Roberts.

=== Professional qualifications ===
Members of the Society are entitled to employ postnominal letters: AMRSB for associates, MRSB for members, and FRSB for Fellows.

The Society is exclusively able to confer a status of Charted Biologist. The title "Chartered Biologist" is legally protected in the UK, and Chartered Biologists have the exclusive entitlement to use the designation CBiol after their names.

Unlike academic qualifications such as a BSc (which indicate a level of training), Chartered status confirms both an academic level of training combined with a period of professional work experience. Chartered status professionally recognises those in their field working at a high level, engenders public confidence in professionals and gives employers confidence in their employees. The status of Chartered Biologist is available to both Fellows (FRSB) and members (MRSB) of the Royal Society of Biology, upon successful application.

The title of Chartered Biologist was originally designated with permission of the Privy Council to appropriately qualified members of the Institute of Biology in July 1984. According to the Privy Council, CBiol "provides evidence that a biologist's professional qualifications and experience have been approved by his peers and is a definite measure of knowledge and ability." The right for the Institute of Biology to confer CBiol was incorporated into the Institute's Royal Charter.

In June 2016 the Society launched the Plant Health Professional Register. The Register provides an opportunity for those working in plant health to have their profession recognised, and to be able to continue their professional development.

In June 2024 the Society launched the Biorisk Professional Registration Scheme. Biorisk Professional Registration provides a mechanism for those involved in management, control, or containment of biorisk to develop and evidence their professional skills and to provide a benchmark of professional competence for duty-holders.

The society is a member of the Science Council, and is licensed to award the professional qualifications of Chartered Scientist (CSci), Registered Scientist (RSci), and Registered Science Technician (RSciTech) status to suitably qualified members. The society can also confer the status of Chartered Science Teacher (CSciTeach).

=== Competitions ===
The Society runs a number of competitions including a photography competition and a children’s drawing competition, BioArtAttack2D.

=== Biology Week ===
The society has organised an annual Biology Week since 2012. It takes place in October and aims to inspire people of all ages and backgrounds with biology. It involves a series of events for scientists, schools, and members of the public.

=== Surveys ===
The Society has run a number citizen science projects in the past, including a Flying Ant Survey with Adam Hart. and a House Spider Survey, also with Hart, to collect reports of sightings of Tegenaria spiders using an app.

In 2014, the Society launched the Starling Murmuration Survey to study why starlings murmurate and thus inform research into why this species is in decline.

The Society has also partnered with the Field Studies Council to run the Signs of Spring survey.

== The Biologist ==
The Biologist
- August 2013 cover
- Editor: Tom Ireland
- Categories: Professional magazine
- Frequency: Bimonthly
- Founded: 1953
- Company: Royal Society of Biology
- Country: United Kingdom
- Language: English
- Website: thebiologist.rsb.org.uk/biologist
- ISSN: 0006-3347
- OCLC: 2240345

The Biologist is a bimonthly British professional magazine published by the Society. The magazine was initially established by one of the two predecessor bodies, the Institute of Biology, in 1953. It is edited by the science journalist Tom Ireland. The magazine is abstracted and indexed in several EBSCO databases, including full-text access through Academic Search Complete.

== See also ==
- Glossary of biology
- List of biologists
- Outline of biology
