= Lucie Green =

British solar physicist (born 1975)

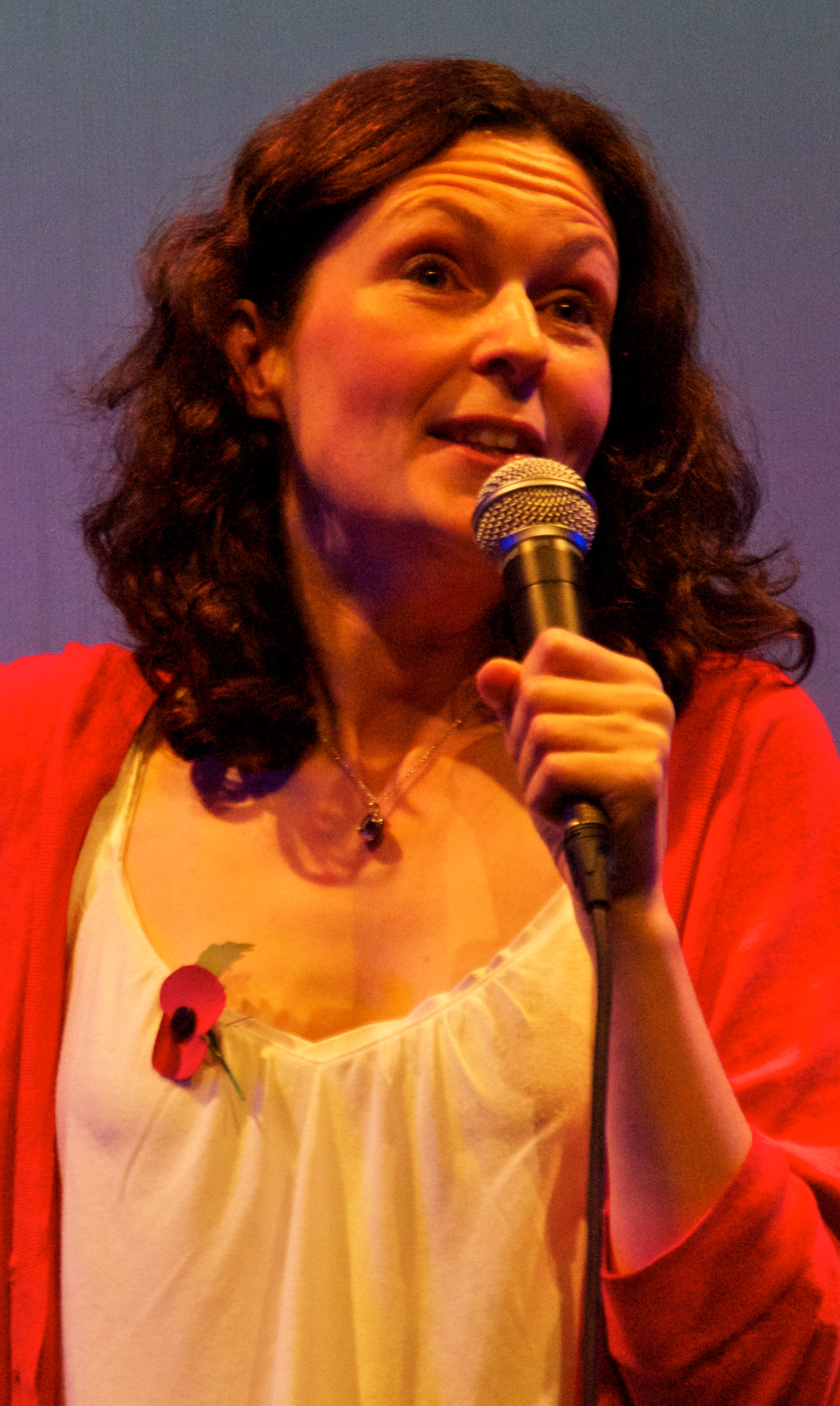
- Green talking at Bright Club in London in November 2011
- Born: Lucinda Green; 1975 (age 50–51); Bedfordshire, England, UK
- Education: Dame Alice Harpur School; University of Sussex; University College London
- Occupation: Science Communicator
- Employer: Mullard Space Science Laboratory
- Television: Presenter, The Sky at Night
- Board member of: European Solar Physics Division of the European Physical Society; Science Museum
- Spouse: Matthew Parker (m. 2014)
- Awards: Kohn Award (2009); Suffrage Science award (2015); Meitner Medal (2017)
- Website: ucl.ac.uk/mssl

Lucinda "Lucie" Green (born 1975) is a British science communicator and solar physicist.

Green is a Professor of Physics and a Royal Society University Research Fellow (previously the Royal Society Dorothy Hodgkin Fellow) at Mullard Space Science Laboratory (MSSL) of the University College London (UCL). Green runs MSSL's public engagement programme and sits on the board of the European Solar Physics Division of the European Physical Society and the advisory board of the Science Museum.

In 2013, Green became the first ever female presenter of The Sky at Night following the death of Sir Patrick Moore.

Green's research focuses primarily on the atmospheric activities of the Sun, particularly coronal mass ejections and the changes in the Sun's magnetic field which triggers them.

== Early life and education ==
Green was born in 1974 or 1975. She attended Dame Alice Harpur School in Bedfordshire, gaining 9 GCSEs and 4 A-levels. After school she initially studied art, before deciding later to study physics. She graduated with a 2:1 Master of Physics degree in physics with astrophysics from the University of Sussex. In 2002, Green completed her PhD in solar physics at the MSSL, University College London.

She returns to her school to discuss her research. Fiona Clements, Green's former physics teacher at the school, has said, “She is a great advocate for young women in science and we are proud that she continues to remember the school by returning to talk about her research to pupils."

"I always liked physics from an early age while I was at school. That was my passion: problem-solving or asking questions and then finding out ways of answering those questions. But I never had a burning ambition of being a space scientist, and I wasn’t even into amateur astronomy [at that time]."

== Career ==
Images captured by the Solar Dynamics Observatory showing a solar eclipse followed by a M6.6 solar flare.

After gaining her PhD, she moved to Cardiff University's School of Physics and Astronomy and became the Project Co-ordinator of the Faulkes Telescope Project. The project enables schools to have remote use of two two-metre class telescopes located in Hawaii (Faulkes Telescope North in Hawaii) and Australia (Faulkes Telescope South in Australia).

Green is a Professor of Physics and a Leverhulme Research Fellow (previously the Royal Society Dorothy Hodgkin Fellow), at MSSL. Her current work focuses on the pattern of magnetic fields in the Sun's atmosphere, which sporadically erupt to form a coronal mass ejection; how these relate to geomagnetic activity and what this means for those living on the Earth.

From 2006 to 2012, she was a member of the Royal Society's Education Committee and was part of their State of the Nation reports Working Group during 2007–2009. She is member of UCL's Steering Committee for the Beacon for Public Engagement. She also runs MSSL's public engagement programme.

=== Solar Orbiter ===
Green is involved in the development of the Solar Orbiter, a Sun-observing satellite under development by the ESA. The aim of the mission is to perform close-up, high-resolution studies of the Sun for a better understanding of its behaviour, heliosphere, solar wind and coronal magnetic field.

== Media appearances ==
Green regularly appears on television and radio, most notably The Sky at Night, Stargazing Live, Stardate, Horizon, Xchange and The One Show. Her radio programmes include The Infinite Monkey Cage, Saturday Live and PM (BBC Radio 4), Material World, Slooh Radio (US), Newshour (BBC World Service), Live Drive and Bacon's Theory (BBC 5 Live), and The Butcher's Apron and Nick Ferrari (LBC).

Between 2004 and 2005 Green co-presented several programmes in the BBC/Open University series Stardate. Episodes include "Stardate: Mission To Titan" which she co-presented with Adam Hart-Davis, covering the European Space Agency successfully landing the Huygens probe on Saturn's largest moon, Titan, and "Stardate: Deep Impact" which she co-presented with Brian Cox, covering NASA successfully colliding a probe into the side of comet Tempel 1 in an effort to learn more about the origins of the Solar System.

Since 2010, Green has appeared on and co-presented several episodes of Stargazing Live and has appeared on several episodes of the BBC Radio 4 show The Infinite Monkey Cage, discussing topics such as the end of the world and parallel universes.

In 2013, Green hosted her own radio programme, Solar Max on BBC Radio 4 on the topic of space weather. The programme explained how emissions from the sun can cause changes in the Earth's magnetic field and upper atmosphere, and what the implications of these are for the UK.

== Personal life ==
When asked where her love of space science came from, Green has said: "As a child, I remember hearing my parents say that they thought I was going to be an astrophysicist when I grew up. Not actually knowing what an astro-thinga-me-wotsit was, I agreed with them because I thought it sounded impressive. Really at that time I wanted to look after animals. People used to bring me injured birds and I would stay up all night feeding them worms!"

In 2014, Green married stand-up comedian and maths communicator Matt Parker. The couple used wedding rings made of meteoric iron.

== Awards and honours ==
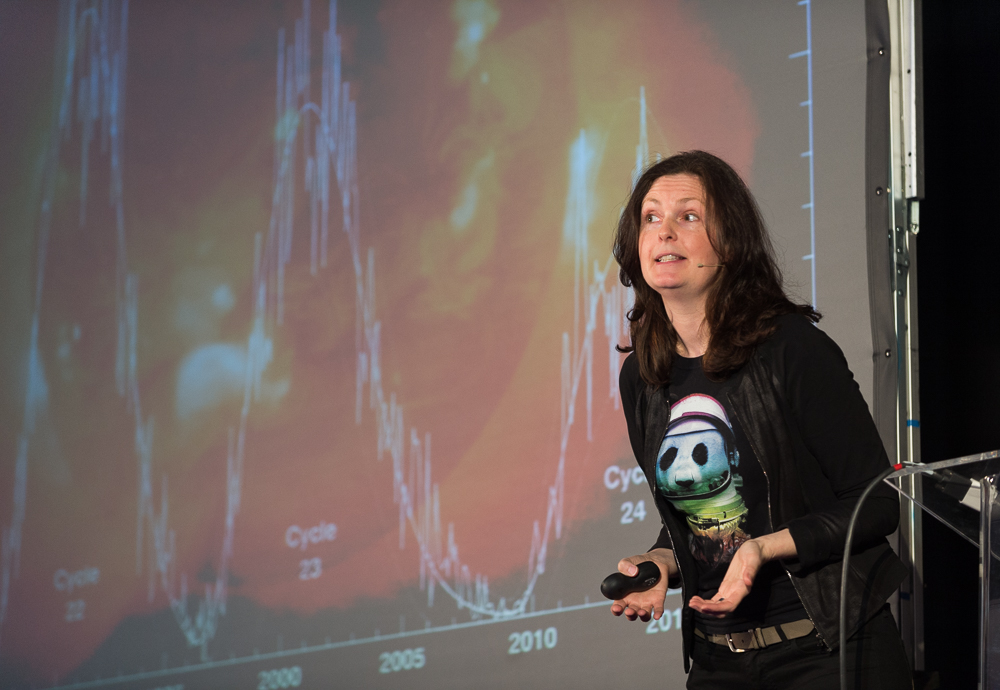
Lucie Green presenting at QEDcon 2015

In 2005, Green was a member of a team that won a Royal Television Society's Life Long Learning and Multimedia Award for a television show covering the transit of Venus, that enabled viewers to make their own Sun-Earth distance measurements using observations of the transit that year.

Green has won awards for her contribution to public engagement with science. In 2009, she was awarded the Royal Society's Kohn Award for Excellence in Engaging the Public with Science, for her work engaging a diverse audience with science, and more specifically, for creating a culture of public engagement within her department.

In 2010, she was named, in The Times October science supplement, Eureka, as one of the UK top ten best science educators under 40.

In 2015, Green had a bust unveiled at the Royal Society in London, whilst being honoured at an event exploring the history of women and science writing. The bust was created and gifted to the Royal Society by Marcus Cornish. That year, Green was also awarded an Engineering and Physical Sciences Suffrage Science Award.

In 2017, Green won the Lise Meitner Medal and Prize of the Institute of Physics.

In 2025, the main belt asteroid 2005 LG_{31} was named 180932 Luciegreen in her honour.

== Publications ==
- Green, Lucie (2016). 15 million degrees : a journey to the centre of the sun. London: Viking. ISBN 978-0-670-92219-2. OCLC 950951102.
- Green, Lucie M.; Torok, Tibor; Vrsnak, Bojan; Manchester, Ward IV; Veronig, Astrid (February 2018). "The Origin, Early Evolution and Predictability of Solar Eruptions". Space Science Reviews. 214 (1): 46. arXiv:1801.04608. Bibcode:2018SSRv..214...46G. doi:10.1007/s11214-017-0462-5.
- Green, L. M.; Kliem, B. (1 August 2009). "Flux Rope Formation Preceding Coronal Mass Ejection Onset". The Astrophysical Journal. 700 (2): L83–L87. arXiv:0906.4794. Bibcode:2009ApJ...700L..83G. doi:10.1088/0004-637X/700/2/L83.
