= Biosciences Federation =

Association based in Cambridge, England

- Abbreviation: BSF
- Formation: 2002
- Dissolved: October 2009
- Legal status: Non-profit organisation
- Purpose: Life science in the UK
- Location: Cambridge, CB1 0AL
- Region served: UK
- Members: Affiliated life science organisations
- Chief Executive: Richard Dyer (2006-9)
- Affiliations: Medical Research Council (UK)
- Website: BSF
- Remarks: Merged in October 2009 with the Institute of Biology to form the Society of Biology

The Biosciences Federation (BSF) was a United Kingdom body formed in 2002.

== Function ==
The Federation aimed to unite the bioscience community over issues of common interest that related to both research and teaching. These organisations are a key component of the UK's knowledge economy. It also aimed to influence the formulation of UK policy relating to biosciences, and to promote public debate on ethical issues. Its interests were in using knowledge gained in research to benefit society, and the impact of legislation on the life sciences industry.

=== Events ===
Each November, it would hold the Life Sciences Careers Conference.

== Structure ==
During October 2009, the Biosciences Federation was merged with the Institute of Biology (IoB) to form the Society of Biology (which boasts some 80,000 members).

The last president of the Federation was Dame Nancy Rothwell (2006–9); Richard Dyer, former director of the Babraham Institute, was the chief executive officer (2006–9). Sir Tom Blundell was a former president (2004–6).

=== Affiliated organisations in the federation ===
From 2007, the Biosciences Federation encompassed 51 member or associated organisations that covered the entire range of life sciences; these included

- Association of the British Pharmaceutical Industry
- Association for the Study of Animal Behaviour
- AstraZeneca
- Biochemical Society
- British Andrology Society
- British Association for Psychopharmacology
- British Ecological Society
- British Neuroscience Association
- British Pharmacological Society
- British Society of Animal Science
- British Society for Cell Biology
- British Society for Developmental Biology
- British Society for Immunology
- British Society for Neuroendocrinology
- British Society for Proteome Research
- British Society for Medical Mycology
- British Toxicological Society
- Experimental Psychology Society
- Genetics Society
- Institute of Animal Technology
- Institute of Biology
- Institute of Horticulture
- Laboratory Animal Science Association
- Linnean Society
- Nutrition Society
- Physiological Society
- Royal Microscopical Society
- Society for Endocrinology
- Society for Applied Microbiology
- Society for Experimental Biology
- Society for General Microbiology
- UK Environmental Mutagen Society
- Zoological Society of London

== Activities ==
The Federation responded to government consultations on biology-related issues; these responses were published on the Federation's website. It also distributed science policy news to a range of organisations that included universities, research councils, pharmaceutical companies and government bodies. The Federation hosted several life sciences careers conferences and symposia on issues such as open access publishing. It also supported the annual award for scientific communication.
