= Jack Horkheimer: Star Hustler (1988 season) =

- No. of episodes: 52

Release
- Original network: PBS
- Original release: January 4 – December 26, 1988

Season chronology
- ← Previous (1987 season) Next → (1989 season)

The 1988 season of the astronomy TV show Jack Horkheimer: Star Hustler starring Jack Horkheimer started on January 4, 1988. During this season, the show still had its original name, Jack Horkheimer: Star Hustler. The show's episode numbering scheme changed several times during its run to coincide with major events in the show's history. The official Star Gazer website hosts the complete scripts for each of the shows.

== 1988 season ==
No. overall	No. in season	Title	Directed by	Written by	Original release date
526	#	"--"	--	Jack Horkheimer	January 4, 1988
527	#	"--"	--	Jack Horkheimer	January 11, 1988
528	#	"--"	--	Jack Horkheimer	January 18, 1988
529	#	"--"	--	Jack Horkheimer	January 25, 1988
530	#	"--"	--	Jack Horkheimer	February 1, 1988
531	#	"--"	--	Jack Horkheimer	February 8, 1988
532	#	"--"	--	Jack Horkheimer	February 15, 1988
533	#	"--"	--	Jack Horkheimer	February 22, 1988
534	#	"--"	--	Jack Horkheimer	February 29, 1988
535	#	"--"	--	Jack Horkheimer	March 7, 1988
536	#	"--"	--	Jack Horkheimer	March 14, 1988
537	#	"--"	--	Jack Horkheimer	March 21, 1988
538	#	"--"	--	Jack Horkheimer	March 28, 1988
539	#	"--"	--	Jack Horkheimer	April 4, 1988
540	#	"--"	--	Jack Horkheimer	April 11, 1988
541	#	"--"	--	Jack Horkheimer	April 18, 1988
542	#	"--"	--	Jack Horkheimer	April 25, 1988
543	#	"The Riddle of Seven Ancient Astronauts ...Solved"	--	Jack Horkheimer	May 2, 1988
544	#	"--"	--	Jack Horkheimer	May 9, 1988
545	#	"--"	--	Jack Horkheimer	May 16, 1988
546	#	"--"	--	Jack Horkheimer	May 23, 1988
547	#	"--"	--	Jack Horkheimer	May 30, 1988
548	#	"--"	--	Jack Horkheimer	June 6, 1988
549	#	"--"	--	Jack Horkheimer	June 13, 1988
550	#	"--"	--	Jack Horkheimer	June 20, 1988
551	#	"--"	--	Jack Horkheimer	June 27, 1988
552	#	"--"	--	Jack Horkheimer	July 4, 1988
553	#	"--"	--	Jack Horkheimer	July 11, 1988
554	#	"--"	--	Jack Horkheimer	July 18, 1988
555	#	"--"	--	Jack Horkheimer	July 25, 1988
556	#	"--"	--	Jack Horkheimer	August 1, 1988
557	#	"--"	--	Jack Horkheimer	August 8, 1988
558	#	"--"	--	Jack Horkheimer	August 15, 1988
559	#	"--"	--	Jack Horkheimer	August 22, 1988
560	#	"--"	--	Jack Horkheimer	August 29, 1988
561	#	"--"	--	Jack Horkheimer	September 5, 1988
562	#	"--"	--	Jack Horkheimer	September 12, 1988
563	#	"--"	--	Jack Horkheimer	September 19, 1988
564	#	"--"	--	Jack Horkheimer	September 26, 1988
565	#	"--"	--	Jack Horkheimer	October 3, 1988
566	#	"--"	--	Jack Horkheimer	October 10, 1988
567	#	"--"	--	Jack Horkheimer	October 17, 1988
568	#	"--"	--	Jack Horkheimer	October 24, 1988
569	#	"--"	--	Jack Horkheimer	October 31, 1988
570	#	"--"	--	Jack Horkheimer	November 7, 1988
571	#	"--"	--	Jack Horkheimer	November 14, 1988
572	#	"--"	--	Jack Horkheimer	November 21, 1988
573	#	"--"	--	Jack Horkheimer	November 28, 1988
574	#	"--"	--	Jack Horkheimer	December 5, 1988
575	#	"--"	--	Jack Horkheimer	December 12, 1988
576	#	"--"	--	Jack Horkheimer	December 19, 1988
577	#	"--"	--	Jack Horkheimer	December 26, 1988
