= Jack Horkheimer: Star Hustler (1987 season) =

- No. of episodes: 52

Release
- Original network: PBS
- Original release: January 5 – December 28, 1987

Season chronology
- ← Previous (1986 season) Next → (1988 season)

The 1987 season of the astronomy TV show Jack Horkheimer: Star Hustler starring Jack Horkheimer started on January 5, 1987. During this season, the show still had its original name, Jack Horkheimer: Star Hustler, though it would later be changed to Star Gazers. The show's episode numbering scheme changed several times during its run to coincide with major historical events. The official Star Gazer website hosts the complete scripts for each show.

== 1987 season ==
No. overall	No. in season	Title	Directed by	Written by	Original release date
474	#	"--"	--	Jack Horkheimer	January 5, 1987
475	#	"--"	--	Jack Horkheimer	January 12, 1987
476	#	"--"	--	Jack Horkheimer	January 19, 1987
477	#	"--"	--	Jack Horkheimer	January 26, 1987
478	#	"--"	--	Jack Horkheimer	February 2, 1987
479	#	"--"	--	Jack Horkheimer	February 9, 1987
480	#	"--"	--	Jack Horkheimer	February 16, 1987
481	#	"--"	--	Jack Horkheimer	February 23, 1987
482	#	"--"	--	Jack Horkheimer	March 2, 1987
483	#	"--"	--	Jack Horkheimer	March 9, 1987
484	#	"--"	--	Jack Horkheimer	March 16, 1987
485	#	"--"	--	Jack Horkheimer	March 23, 1987
486	#	"--"	--	Jack Horkheimer	March 30, 1987
487	#	"--"	--	Jack Horkheimer	April 6, 1987
488	#	"--"	--	Jack Horkheimer	April 13, 1987
489	#	"--"	--	Jack Horkheimer	April 20, 1987
490	#	"A Spectacular Meeting of the King and Queen of the Cosmos"	--	Jack Horkheimer	April 27, 1987
491	#	"Midnight Moon Magic"	--	Jack Horkheimer	May 4, 1987
492	#	"The Month of the Glowing Horizon"	--	Jack Horkheimer	May 11, 1987
493	#	"--"	--	Jack Horkheimer	May 18, 1987
494	#	"--"	--	Jack Horkheimer	May 25, 1987
495	#	"The Great Mars/Mercury "Maybe""	Charlie White	Jack Horkheimer	June 1, 1987
496	#	"--"	--	Jack Horkheimer	June 8, 1987
497	#	"How to Participate in Our Third Annual "Day-Star-Day", An Experience You'll Never Forget!"	--	Jack Horkheimer	June 15, 1987
498	#	"--"	--	Jack Horkheimer	June 22, 1987
499	#	"When the Earth is Farthest From the Sun"	--	Jack Horkheimer	June 29, 1987
500	#	"--"	--	Jack Horkheimer	July 6, 1987
501	#	"--"	--	Jack Horkheimer	July 13, 1987
502	#	"--"	--	Jack Horkheimer	July 20, 1987
503	#	"--"	--	Jack Horkheimer	July 27, 1987
504	#	"--"	--	Jack Horkheimer	August 3, 1987
505	#	"The Tortoise and the M.D."	--	Jack Horkheimer	August 10, 1987
506	#	"--"	--	Jack Horkheimer	August 17, 1987
507	#	"--"	--	Jack Horkheimer	August 24, 1987
508	#	"--"	--	Jack Horkheimer	August 31, 1987
509	#	"--"	--	Jack Horkheimer	September 7, 1987
510	#	"--"	--	Jack Horkheimer	September 14, 1987
511	#	"--"	--	Jack Horkheimer	September 21, 1987
512	#	"--"	--	Jack Horkheimer	September 28, 1987
513	#	"The Scorpion and the Midnight Hunter and Shine On, Harvest Moon"	Charlie White	Jack Horkheimer	October 5, 1987
514	#	"--"	--	Jack Horkheimer	October 12, 1987
515	#	"--"	--	Jack Horkheimer	October 19, 1987
516	#	"--"	--	Jack Horkheimer	October 26, 1987
517	#	"--"	--	Jack Horkheimer	November 2, 1987
518	#	"--"	--	Jack Horkheimer	November 9, 1987
519	#	"--"	--	Jack Horkheimer	November 16, 1987
520	#	"--"	--	Jack Horkheimer	November 23, 1987
521	#	"--"	--	Jack Horkheimer	November 30, 1987
522	#	"--"	--	Jack Horkheimer	December 7, 1987
523	#	"--"	--	Jack Horkheimer	December 14, 1987
524	#	"--"	--	Jack Horkheimer	December 21, 1987
525	#	"--"	--	Jack Horkheimer	December 28, 1987
