= Jack Horkheimer: Star Gazer (2011 season) =

- No. of episodes: 52

Release
- Original network: PBS
- Original release: January 3 – December 26, 2011

Season chronology
- ← Previous (2010 season) Next → (2012 season)

The 2011 season of the astronomy TV show Jack Horkheimer: Star Gazer started on January 3, 2011, with guest host Dean Regas of the Cincinnati Observatory. This is the first full season after Jack Horkheimer's death. The series tried out new hosts and settled on Dean Regas and James Albury to be co-hosts on the show. On October 3, 2011, the title of the series was changed to Star Gazers. The show's name change was accompanied by the launch of a new Star Gazers website for the series; while, the older Jack Horkheimer: Star Gazer website continued to be maintained and updated as well.

== 2011 season ==
No. overall	No. in season	Title	Directed by	Written by	Original release date
1726	#11-01	"Venus And The Sun : Now Closest, Biggest And Brightest For 2011"	--	Dean Regas	January 3, 2011
1727	#11-02	"The Reasons For The Seasons"	--	Dean Regas	January 10, 2011
1728	#11-03	"The Moon Shows You The Way To Venus And Mercury. Plus Which Is The Shortest Season?"	--	Dean Regas	January 17, 2011
1729	#11-04	"See The Skinniest Moon Of The Year And Has Jupiter Made A Comeback?"	--	Dean Regas	January 24, 2011
1730	#11-05	"The Orion Family"	--	Dean Regas	January 31, 2011
1731	#11-06	"The King Of The Gods And The Valentine's Star"	--	Ed Romano	February 7, 2011
1732	#11-07	"Jupiter And The Brightest Star In The Night Sky"	--	Bill Dishong	February 14, 2011
1733	#11-08	"Venus, The Morning Star, Will Wow You Next Week"	--	Ed Romano	February 21, 2011
1734	#11-09	"The Three Wonderful Stars Of The Winter Triangle"	--	Ed Romano	February 28, 2011
1735	#11-10	"The Biggest Full Moon In 18 Years! Plus Jupiter and Mercury Have A Super Scoochy"	--	Dean Regas	March 7, 2011
1736	#11-11	"Finding Direction In The Night Sky"	--	Dean Regas	March 14, 2011
1737	#11-12	"Venus And The Moon At Dawn, PlusThe Zodiacal Light At Night"	--	Dean Regas	March 21, 2011
1738	#11-13	"Arcturus And Saturn Join The Moon And The Pleiades For A Spring Evening Star Show"	--	Dean Regas	March 28, 2011
1739	#11-14	"Awesome Arcturus, Star Of A Million Years"	--	James Albury	April 4, 2011
1740	#11-15	"There's A New Triangle In Your Sky Next Week"	--	James Albury	April 11, 2011
1741	#11-16	"An Ancient Drama In The Night Sky"	--	James Albury	April 18, 2011
1742	#11-17	"Stars, Planets And The Moon For Astronomy Day This Year"	--	James Albury	April 25, 2011
1743	#11-18	"A Lion At Night And Plenty Of Planets In The Dawn's Early Light"	--	Dean Regas	May 2, 2011
1744	#11-19	"Take The Seven Day Star Gazer Astronomy Challenge"	--	Dean Regas	May 9, 2011
1745	#11-20	"Half A Dozen Planets And A Load Of Moons"	--	Dean Regas	May 16, 2011
1746	#11-21	"The Horse On The Handle Of The Big Dipper"	--	Dean Regas	May 23, 2011
1747	#11-22	"Let The Moon Lead The Way"	--	Dean Regas	May 30, 2011
1748	#11-23	"Those Starry Summer Nights Are Coming"	--	James Albury	June 6, 2011
1749	#11-24	"Join Us In Our Annual Day Star Day Celebration On This Summer Solstice Weekend 2011"	--	James Albury	June 13, 2011
1750	#11-25	"A Bunch Of Celestial Triple Headers Next Week"	--	James Albury	June 20, 2011
1751	#11-26	"A Lunar Liaison With Leo The Lion"	--	James Albury	June 27, 2011
1752	#11-27	"A Special Sky For The 4th Of July"	--	Dean Regas	July 4, 2011
1753	#11-28	"Planets, Planets Everywhere: Jupiter and Mars in the Morning; Saturn and Mercury in the Evening"	--	Dean Regas	July 11, 2011
1754	#11-29	"The Summer Triangle Shines High In The Sky Plus Mars And The Moon Pass Through The Horns Of The Bull"	--	Dean Regas	July 18, 2011
1755	#11-30	"Rollin' Down The River Of Stars"	--	Dean Regas	July 25, 2011
1756	#11-31	"The Meteor Shower That Fizzled And Twinkle, Twinkle Little Star"	--	James Albury	August 1, 2011
1757	#11-32	"A Little Bit Of Winter In August"	--	Unknown	August 8, 2011
1758	#11-33	"Follow The Moon From Jupiter to Mars"	--	James Albury	August 15, 2011
1759	#11-34	"Saturn, Spica And Selene, Oh My! And Saturn Says "Bye-Bye" To A Pair Of Dancing Stars"	--	James Albury	August 22, 2011
1760	#11-35	"A Pair Of Triangles In The Sky For Labor Day And Mercury At Dawn"	--	James Albury	August 29, 2011
1761	#11-36	"Use The Harvest Moon To Find Jupiter And The Ram"	--	Dean Regas	September 5, 2011
1762	#11-37	"Welcome Autumn With Jupiter And Vega"	--	Dean Regas	September 12, 2011
1763	#11-38	"Call Triple A For Star Trouble!"	--	Dean Regas	September 19, 2011
1764	#11-39	"The False Dawn Of Omar Khayyam"	--	Dean Regas	September 26, 2011
1765	#11-40	"The Hunter's Moon For 2011"	--	Dean Regas, James Albury	October 3, 2011
1766	#11-41	"The Secret Lives Of Stars"	--	Dean Regas, James Albury	October 10, 2011
1767	#11-42	"Pegasus, The Pleiades, And The Farthest You Can See With The Naked Eye! Plus Two Bright Planets In The Sky!"	--	Dean Regas, James Albury	October 17, 2011
1768	#11-43	"The Monsters Of The Sky For Halloween"	--	Dean Regas, James Albury	October 24, 2011
1769	#11-44	"Plenty Of Planets For The Evening Sky"	--	Dean Regas, James Albury	October 31, 2011
1770	#11-45	"Pairs Of Planets At Dusk And Dawn"	--	Unknown	November 7, 2011
1771	#11-46	"Planets, Stars And The Moon At Dawn's Early Light"	--	Unknown	November 14, 2011
1772	#11-47	"Super Bright Jupiter And Venus Share The Sky With Three Cosmic Birds For Thanksgiving Week"	--	Unknown	November 21, 2011
1773	#11-48	"The Old Moon In The New Moon's Arms"	--	Unknown	November 28, 2011
1774	#11-49	"Red Moon In The Morning"	--	Unknown	December 5, 2011
1775	#11-50	"The Reasons For The Seasons"	--	Unknown	December 12, 2011
1776	#11-51	"Five Fabulous Planets For The Holidays"	--	Unknown	December 19, 2011
1777	#11-52	"Ring In 2012 With Star Gazers' Special New Year's Eve Star"	--	Unknown	December 26, 2011
