= Asian Scientist 100 =

Academic award of Asia

- Awarded for: "Asia’s most outstanding researchers"
- Date: April 30, 2016
- Presented by: Asian Scientist
- First award: 2016
- Website: Asian Scientist 100

The Asian Scientist 100 is an annually published list of 100 prize-winning Asian researchers, academicians, innovators and business leaders from across the Asia-Pacific region and a range of scientific disciplines, by the English language science and technology magazine Asian Scientist.

To be selected for this list, the recipient must have won a national or international research prize in the past year, or have demonstrated significant achievement through a major scientific discovery or leadership in academia or industry.

== Laureates ==
Year	Name	Country	Affiliation
2016	Yongyuth Yuthavong	Thailand	Government of Thailand
2016	Wang Yifang	China	Institute of High Energy Physics, CAS
2016	Tan Gee Paw	Singapore	Public Utilities Board
2016	Tan Chorh Chuan	Singapore	National University of Singapore
2016	Eisuke Tada	Japan	International Thermonuclear Experimental Reactor (ITER)
2016	M. R. Srinivasan	India	Nuclear Power Corporation of India
2016	C. N. R. Rao	India	Government of India
2016	Li Jinghai	China	Chinese Academy of Sciences
2016	Lee Jae Kyu	South Korea	KAIST
2016	Lee Hoesung	South Korea	Intergovernmental Panel on Climate Change (IPCC)
2016	Yang Ke	China	Peking University
2016	Bai Chunli	China	Chinese Academy of Sciences
2016	Tan Tieniu	China	Chinese Academy of Sciences
2016	Agachai Sumalee	Thailand	King Mongkut’s Institute of Technology Ladkrabang
2016	Song Kiseok	South Korea	KAIST
2016	Jayant Haritsa	India	Indian Institute of Science
2016	Vijay P. Bhatkar	India	India International Multiversity (IIMv)
2016	Manindra Agrawal	India	Indian Institute of Technology Kanpur
2016	Yu Kyoungsik	South Korea	KAIST
2016	Yu Chengzhong	China	University of Queensland
2016	Benjamin Tee	Singapore	Agency for Science, Technology and Research
2016	Yosiro Oono	Japan	Kyushu University
2016	Andrew Nee	Singapore	National University of Singapore
2016	Masayoshi Nakashima	Japan	Kyoto University
2016	Lu Chih-Yuan	Taiwan	Macronix International
2016	Lim Chwee Teck	Singapore	National University of Singapore
2016	Lee Sung-Hee	South Korea	KAIST
2016	Viswanathan Kumaran	India	Indian Institute of Science, Bangalore
2016	Neeti Kailas	US	Nestle Purina North America
2016	Gao Huijun	China	Harbin Institute of Technology
2016	Masayoshi Esashi	Japan	Tohoku University
2016	Ahn Byung Min	South Korea	Ajou University
2016	Zong Chuanming	China	Peking University
2016	Yuan Yaxiang	China	Academy of Mathematics and Systems Science, Chinese Academy of Sciences
2016	Shin Jinwoo	South Korea	KAIST
2016	Dang Thi Oanh	Vietnam	Thái Nguyên University of Information and Communications Technology
2016	Shinichi Mochizuki	Japan	Kyoto University
2016	Zhao Zhongxian	China	Institute of Physics, Chinese Academy of Sciences
2016	Yu Min	China	Chinese Academy of Sciences
2016	Yao Wang	Hong Kong	University of Hong Kong
2016	Yang Chen-Ning	China	Tsinghua University
2016	Tsumoru Shintake	Japan	Okinawa Institute of Science and Technology
2016	Hideo Ohno	Japan	Tohuku University
2016	Ken'ichi Nomoto	Japan	Kavli Institute for the Physics and Mathematics of the Universe
2016	Takaaki Kajita	Japan	University of Tokyo
2016	Han Yilong	Hong Kong	Hong Kong University of Science and Technology
2016	Chen Xianhui	China	University of Science and Technology of China
2016	Shuji Nakamura	Japan	University of California, Santa Barbara
2016	Hiroshi Amano	Japan	Nagoya University
2016	Isamu Akasaki	Japan	Nagoya University
2016	Vivian Yam	Hong Kong	University of Hong Kong
2016	Xie Yi	China	University of Science and Technology of China
2016	Wong Chi-Huey	Taiwan	Academia Sinica
2016	Jirō Tsuji	Japan	Tokyo Institute of Technology
2016	You Shuli	China	Shanghai Institute of Organic Chemistry
2016	Peng Shie-Ming	Taiwan	National Taiwan University
2016	Seo Myungeun	South Korea	KAIST
2016	Max Lu	China	University of Queensland, Australia
2016	Masako Yudasaka	Japan	National Institute of Advanced Industrial Science and Technology (AIST)
2016	Akira Koshio	Japan	Mie University
2016	Sumio Iijima	Japan	Meijo University and AIST
2016	Itaru Hamachi	Japan	Kyoto University
2016	Srivari Chandrasekhar	India	CSIR-Indian Institute of Chemical Technology
2016	Yang Yuanqing	China	Lenovo Group
2016	Kiran Mazumdar-Shaw	India	Biocon Ltd.
2016	Olivia Lum	Singapore	Hyflux Ltd.
2016	Zhang Feng	US	Massachusetts Institute of Technology
2016	Tu Youyou	China	China Academy of Traditional Chinese Medicine
2016	Shubha Tole	India	Tata Institute of Fundamental Research
2016	Masayo Takahashi	Japan	RIKEN Center for Developmental Biology
2016	Shimon Sakaguchi	Japan	Osaka University
2016	Tran Ha-Lien Phuong	Vietnam	Vietnam National University
2016	Satoshi Ōmura	Japan	Kitasato University
2016	Yoshinori Ohsumi	Japan	Tokyo Institute of Technology
2016	Irene Ng Oi Lin	Hong Kong	University of Hong Kong
2016	Shigekazu Nagata	Japan	Osaka University
2016	Kazutoshi Mori	Japan	Kyoto University
2016	Satyajit Mayor	India	National Centre for Biological Sciences
2016	Lee Jeong Ho	South Korea	KAIST
2016	Hiroshi Kimura	Japan	Tokyo Institute of Technology
2016	Nancy Ip	Hong Kong	Hong Kong University of Science and Technology
2016	Tasuku Honjo	Japan	Kyoto University
2016	Hiroshi Hamada	Japan	Osaka University
2016	Akira Endo	Japan	Tokyo University of Agriculture and Technology
2016	Chang Tse Wen	Taiwan	Academia Sinica
2016	Chan Yoke-Fun	Malaysia	University of Malaya
2016	Takuo Aoyagi	Japan	Nihon Kohden Corporation
2016	Khadg Singh Valdiya	India	Jawaharlal Nehru Centre for Advanced Scientific Research
2016	Gavino Cajulao Trono Jr.	Philippines	University of the Philippines Marine Science Institute
2016	Yutaka Takahasi	Japan	University of Tokyo
2016	Alfredo Mahar Lagmay	Philippines	University of the Philippines Diliman, National Institute of Geological Sciences
2016	Edgardo D. Gomez	Philippines	University of the Philippines Marine Science Institute
2016	Chung Sun-lin	Taiwan	Academia Sinica
2016	Angel C. Alcala	Philippines	Silliman University
2016	Zhang Fusuo	China	China Agricultural University
2016	Li Jiayang	China	Chinese Academy of Agricultural Sciences
2016	C. L. Laxmipathi Gowda	India	International Crops Research Institute for the Semi-Arid Tropics
2016	Ramon Cabanos Barba	Philippines	University of the Philippines Los Baños
2016	Koppillil Radhakrishnan	India	Indian Space Research Organisation
2016	P. C. Agrawal	India	Tata Institute of Fundamental Research
2017	Aristotle T. Ubando	Philippines	De La Salle University
2017	Reasmey Tan	Cambodia	Institute of Technology of Cambodia
2017	Thi Thi Soe	Myanmar	Ministry of Science and Technology
2017	Worajit Setthapun	Thailand	Chiang Mai Rajabhat University
2017	Fatehah Mohd Omar	Malaysia	University of Science Malaysia
2017	Supawadee Namuangruk	Thailand	National Nanotechnology Center, National Science and Technology Development Agency
2017	Latsamy Phounvisouk	Laos	National Agriculture and Forestry Research Institute
2017	Ho Ghim Wei	Singapore	National University of Singapore
2017	Chua Kian Jon	Singapore	National University of Singapore
2017	Rajasekhar Balasubramanian	Singapore	National University of Singapore
2017	Sharifah Rafidah Wan Alwi	Malaysia	University of Technology Malaysia
2017	Menandro N. Acda	Philippines	University of the Philippines Los Baños
2017	Xue Qikun	China	Tsinghua University
2017	Yeom Han-woong	South Korea	Institute for Basic Science
2017	Wen Liangjian	China	Institute of High Energy Physics, Chinese Academy of Sciences
2017	Umesh Waghmare	India	Jawaharlal Nehru Centre for Advanced Scientific Research
2017	S. Anantha Ramakrishna	India	Indian Institute of Technology Kanpur
2017	G. Ravindra Kumar	India	Tata Institute of Fundamental Research
2017	Kim Yang-Hann	South Korea	KAIST
2017	Kim Myungshik	South Korea	Korea Institute for Advanced Study
2017	Kim Kwanpyo	South Korea	Ulsan National Institute of Science and Technology
2017	Peng Shige	China	Shandong University
2017	Mahan Mj	India	Tata Institute of Fundamental Research
2017	Joseph M. Pasia	Philippines	University of the Philippines Diliman
2017	Amalendu Krishna	India	Tata Institute of Fundamental Research
2017	Naveen Garg	India	Indian Institute of Technology Delhi
2017	Choi Kyudong	South Korea	Ulsan National Institute of Science and Technology
2017	Kathleen Aviso	Philippines	De La Salle University
2017	Zhao Dongyuan	China	Fudan University
2017	Takuo Sugano	Japan	University of Tokyo
2017	Nadnudda Rodthongkum	Thailand	Chulalongkorn University
2017	Liu Xiaogang	Singapore	National University of Singapore
2017	Jiang Lei	China	Technical Institute of Physics and Chemistry
2017	Hiroshi Kawazoe	Japan	Tokyo Institute of Technology
2017	Toshio Kamiya	Japan	Tokyo Institute of Technology
2017	Hideo Hosono	Japan	Tokyo Institute of Technology
2017	Jackie Y. Ying	Singapore	Institute of Bioengineering and Nanotechnology
2017	Hiroshi Matsumoto	Japan	RIKEN
2017	Chiels Liu Chen-Kun	Hong Kong	Medecins Sans Frontieres Hong Kong
2017	Bertil Andersson	Singapore	Nanyang Technological University
2017	Venkata Narayana Padmanabhan	India	Microsoft Research India
2017	Takao Nishitani	Japan	Tokyo Metropolitan University
2017	Masaki Yamamoto	Japan	Keysight Technologies
2017	Tetsuo Endoh	Japan	Tohoku University
2017	Gishi Chung	Japan	Tokyo Electron
2017	Zhao Guochun	Hong Kong	University of Hong Kong
2017	Yang Xiaoping	China	Institute of Geology and Geophysics
2017	Sunil Kumar Singh	India	Physical Research Laboratory
2017	Augustus C. Resurreccion	Philippines	University of the Philippines Diliman
2017	Neo Mei Lin	Singapore	Tropical Marine Science Institute, National University of Singapore
2017	Chong Song	South Korea	KAIST
2017	Yi Yung	South Korea	KAIST
2017	Wang Rong	Singapore	Nanyang Technological University
2017	Betty Tsai	Singapore	Procter & Gamble
2017	Akira Toriumi	Japan	University of Tokyo
2017	Sul Seung Ki	South Korea	Seoul National University
2017	Show Pau Loke	Malaysia	University of Nottingham Malaysia Campus
2017	Oh Jun-Ho	South Korea	KAIST
2017	He Jinsong	Singapore	National University of Singapore
2017	Masayoshi Esashi	Japan	Tohoku University
2017	Avinash Kumar Agarwal	India	Indian Institute of Technology Kanpur
2017	Wu Yundong	China	Peking University
2017	Mitsuo Sawamoto	Japan	Kyoto University
2017	Hiroyuki Ohshima	Japan	Tokyo University of Science
2017	Partha Sarathi Mukherjee	India	Indian Institute of Science
2017	Kōsuke Morita	Japan	RIKEN
2017	Liu Bin	Singapore	National University of Singapore
2017	Ling Xing Yi	Singapore	Nanyang Technological University
2017	Kee Jung-Min	South Korea	Ulsan National Institute of Science and Technology
2017	Ding Kuiling	China	State Key Laboratory of Organometallic Chemistry, Chinese Academy of Sciences
2017	Takahiko Akiyama	Japan	Gakushuin University
2017	Hiroshi Iwasaki	Japan	Tokyo Institute of Technology
2017	Maria Corazon A. De Ungria	Philippines	University of the Philippines Diliman
2017	Sumitra Thongprasert	Thailand	Chiang Mai University
2017	Tsay Yi-Fang	Taiwan	Academia Sinica
2017	Masayo Takahashi	Japan	RIKEN
2017	Amit Sharma	India	International Centre for Genetic Engineering and Biotechnology
2017	Raymond L. Rosales	Philippines	Pontifical and Royal University of Santo Tomas
2017	Windell L. Rivera	Philippines	University of the Philippines Diliman
2017	Reena Rajasuriar	Malaysia	University of Malaya
2017	Yoshinori Ohsumi	Japan	Tokyo Institute of Technology
2017	Sudjit Luanpitpong	Thailand	Siriraj Center of Excellence for Stem Cell Research
2017	Dennis Lo	Hong Kong	Chinese University of Hong Kong
2017	Nethia Mohana Kumaran	Malaysia	University of Science Malaysia
2017	Nicholas Plachta	Singapore	Institute of Molecular and Cell Biology
2017	Tasuku Honjo	Japan	Kyoto University
2017	Emmanuel P. Estrella	Philippines	University of the Philippines Manila
2017	Chen Hualan	China	Herbin Veterinary Research Institute
2017	Suvendra Nath Bhattacharyya	India	CSIR Indian Institute of Chemical Biology
2017	Niyaz Ahmed	India	University of Hyderabad
2017	Maria Czarina Acelajado	Philippines	University of the Philippines Manila
2017	Yuan Longping	China	Chinese Academy of Engineering
2017	Witri Wahyu Lestari	Indonesia	Sebelas Maret University
2017	Phung Le	Vietnam	Ho Chi Minh City University of Technology
2017	G. Satheesh Reddy	India	Defense Research and Development Organization
2017	Udupi Ramachandra Rao	India	Physical Research Laboratory
2017	Ong Kien Soo	Singapore	ST Electronics
2017	Lim Wee Seng	Singapore	Nanyang Technological University
2017	Desmond Lim	Singapore	DSO National Laboratories
2017	Kwoh Leong Keong	Singapore	National University of Singapore
2018	Michael Ming-Chiao Lai	Taiwan	Academia Sinica
2018	Ajoy Kumar Ray	India	Indian Institute of Engineering Science and Technology
2018	Chandrakant Pithawa	India	Electronics Corporation of India Limited
2018	S. Suresh Babu	India	Vikram Sarabhai Space Centre
2018	Jitendra Nath Goswami	India	Physical Research Laboratory
2018	Rogel Mari Sese	Philippines	National Space Development Program
2018	Min Aung	Myanmar	University of Veterinary Science
2018	Rajan Man Bajracharya	Nepal	Db2Map
2018	Hari Krishna Dhonju	Nepal	Db2Map
2018	Chandra Siddaiah Nayaka	India	University of Mysore
2018	Kalvakuntla Chandrashekhar Rao	India	Government of Telangana
2018	Sheetal Sharma	India	International Rice Research Institute
2018	Hiroshi Uchino	Japan	Tohoku Agricultural Research Center
2018	Chen Wen	China	Tianjin Medical University
2018	Amit Dutt	India	Tata Memorial Centre
2018	Tamao Endo	Japan	Tokyo Metropolitan Geriatric Hospital and Institute of Gerontology
2018	Tatsushi Toda	Japan	Kobe University
2018	Deepak Gaur	India	Jawaharlal Nehru University
2018	Edward Holmes	Singapore	National University of Singapore
2018	Sir David Lane	Singapore	Agency for Science, Technology and Research
2018	Li Jingmei	Singapore	Genome Institute of Singapore
2018	Mario Antonio Jiz II	Philippines	Research Institute for Tropical Medicine
2018	V. Narry Kim	South Korea	Seoul National University and Institute for Basic Science
2018	Tadamitsu Kishimoto	Japan	Osaka University
2018	Seiji Ogawa	Japan	Tohoku Fukushi University
2018	Paik Soonmyung	South Korea	Yonsei University
2018	Shimon Sakaguchi	Japan	Osaka University
2018	Paul Kwong Hang Tam	Hong Kong	University of Hong Kong
2018	Tu Youyou	China	China Academy of Traditional Chinese Medicine
2018	Tehemton Erach Udwadia	India	Breach Candy Hospital and PD Hinduja Hospital
2018	Yu Nam-Kyung	South Korea	Seoul National University
2018	Lucille V. Abad	Philippines	Philippine Nuclear Research Institute
2018	Pimchai Chaiyen	Thailand	Mahidol University
2018	Pussana Hirunsit	Thailand	National Science and Technology Development Agency
2018	Kim Myung-hwan	South Korea	LG Chem
2018	Ganpathi Naresh Patwari	India	Indian Institute of Technology Bombay
2018	Long Ran	China	University of Science and Technology of China
2018	Phan Thanh Sơn Nam	Vietnam	Ho Chi Minh City University of Technology
2018	Mitsuo Sawamoto	Japan	Kyoto University
2018	Xie Xiaoliang Sunney	China	Peking University
2018	Sanghamitra Bandyopadhyay	India	Indian Statistical Institute
2018	Cha Hyung Joon	South Korea	Pohang University of Science and Technology
2018	James C. C. Chan	Hong Kong	University of Hong Kong
2018	He Jinliang	China	Tsinghua University
2018	Jang Jin	South Korea	Kyung Hee University
2018	Anchalee Manonukul	Thailand	National Science and Technology Development Agency
2018	Neelesh B. Mehta	India	Indian Institute of Science
2018	Takashi Mimura	Japan	Fujitsu Laboratories
2018	Lanndon A. Ocampo	Philippines	Cebu Technological University
2018	Pack Sangheon	South Korea	Korea University
2018	Tang Ching Wan	Hong Kong	Hong Kong University of Science and Technology
2018	Jackie Y. Ying	Singapore	Institute of Bioengineering and Nanotechnology
2018	Kenneth Mei-yee Leung	Hong Kong	University of Hong Kong
2018	Jeffrey S. Perez	Philippines	Philippine Institute of Volcanology and Seismology
2018	Yan Ning	Singapore	National University of Singapore
2018	Aletta Concepcion T. Yñiguez	Philippines	University of the Philippines Diliman
2018	Shigeki Goto	Japan	Waseda University
2018	Tanzima Hashem	Bangladesh	Bangladesh University of Engineering and Technology
2018	N. R. Narayana Murthy	India	Infosys
2018	Wu Jianping	China	Tsinghua University
2018	Chang Meemann	China	Institute of Vertebrate Paleontology and Paleoanthropology
2018	Lam Khin Yong	Singapore	Nanyang Technological University, Singapore
2018	Jenny Huey-Jen Su	Taiwan	National Cheng Kung University
2018	Subra Suresh	Singapore	Nanyang Technological University, Singapore
2018	Phillip A. Alviola	Philippines	University of the Philippines Los Baños
2018	Upinder Singh Bhalla	India	National Centre for Biological Sciences
2018	Varodom Charoensawan	Thailand	Mahidol University
2018	Sanjeev Das	India	National Institute of Immunology
2018	Tetsuya Higashiyama	Japan	Nagoya University
2018	Deepak Thankappan Nair	India	Regional Centre for Biotechnology
2018	Shigetou Namba	Japan	University of Tokyo
2018	Marisa Ponpuak	Thailand	Mahidol University
2018	Shi Yigong	China	Tsinghua University
2018	Son Young-Sook	South Korea	Kyung Hee University
2018	Yasuhiko Arakawa	Japan	University of Tokyo
2018	Napida Hinchiranan	Thailand	Chulalongkorn University
2018	Lee Jong-Heun	South Korea	Korea University
2018	Aloke Paul	India	Indian Institute of Science
2018	Justin C. W. Song	Singapore	Institute of High Performance Computing
2018	Toshimitsu Yokobori	Japan	Tohoku University
2018	Zhao Zhongxian	China	Chinese Academy of Sciences
2018	Zhu Yanwu	China	University of Science and Technology of China
2018	Gan Wee Teck	Singapore	National University of Singapore
2018	Ritabrata Munshi	India	Tata Institute of Fundamental Research
2018	Sum Nguyễn	Vietnam	Quy Nhon University
2018	Xu Chenyang	China	Beijing International Center of Mathematics Research
2018	Chen Shiyi	China	South University of Science and Technology
2018	Choi Sookyung	South Korea	Gyeongsang National University
2018	Gao Weibo	Singapore	Nanyang Technological University, Singapore
2018	Vinay Gupta	India	National Physical Laboratory
2018	Nathaniel P. Hermosa II	Philippines	University of the Philippines Diliman
2018	Nissim Kanekar	India	Tata Institute of Fundamental Research
2018	Pan Jianwei	China	University of Science and Technology of China
2018	David Ruffolo	Thailand	Mahidol University
2018	Fumihiko Takasaki	Japan	High Energy Accelerator Research Organization
2018	Adeeb Hayyan	Malaysia	University of Malaya
2018	Li Junfeng	China	Energy Research Institute of the National Development and Reform Commission
2018	Ng Wun Jern	Singapore	Nanyang Technological University, Singapore
2018	Felycia Edi Soetaredjo	Indonesia	Widya Mandala Catholic University Surabaya
2018	Xie Zhenhua	China	National Development and Reform Commission
2019	Son Young-Woo	South Korea	Korea Institute for Advanced Study
2019	Urbasi Sinha	India	Raman Research Institute
2019	Hirosi Ooguri	Japan	University of Tokyo
2019	Ng Kwan Hoong	Malaysia	University of Malaya
2019	Gao Hongjun	China	Institute of Physics, Chinese Academy of Sciences
2019	Xu Zongben	China	Xi’an Jiaotong University
2019	Wu Yirong	China	Institute of Electronics, Chinese Academy of Sciences
2019	Oh Hee	South Korea	Korea Institute for Advanced Study
2019	Hasibun Naher	Bangladesh	BRAC University
2019	Ritabrata Munshi	India	Tata Institute of Fundamental Research
2019	Shigeo Kusuoka	Japan	University of Tokyo
2019	Masaki Kashiwara	Japan	Kyoto University
2019	Akira Yoshino	Japan	Asahi Kasei
2019	Wang Jianfang	Hong Kong	Chinese University of Hong Kong
2019	Tian Yongjun	China	Yanshan University
2019	Anjan Soumyanarayanan	Singapore	A*STAR Institute of Materials Research and Engineering & National University of Singapore
2019	Thalappil Pradeep	India	Indian Institute of Technology Madras
2019	Marissa Paglicawan	Philippines	Department of Science and Technology
2019	Yukiko Ogawa	Japan	National Institute of Materials Science
2019	Nguyen Thi Hiep	Vietnam	Vietnam National University
2019	Luo Huixia	China	Sun Yat-sen University
2019	Liu Zheng	Singapore	Nanyang Technological University
2019	Hideo Hosono	Japan	Tokyo Institute of Technology
2019	Takuzo Aida	Japan	University of Tokyo
2019	Xue Shifeng	Singapore	Institute of Molecular and Cell Biology
2019	Chikashi Toyoshima	Japan	University of Tokyo
2019	Gen Suwa	Japan	University of Tokyo
2019	Susumu Seino	Japan	Kobe University
2019	Wirulda Pootakham	Thailand	National Center for Genetic Engineering and Biotechnology
2019	Nguyen Thanh Liem	Vietnam	Vinmec Research Institute of Stem Cell and Gene Technology
2019	Tetsuo Nagano	Japan	University of Tokyo
2019	Louis Tan	Singapore	National Neuroscience Institute
2019	Tan Eng King	Singapore	National Neuroscience Institute
2019	Ng Huck Hui	Singapore	Genome Institute of Singapore
2019	Lim Kah Leong	Singapore	National University of Singapore
2019	Li Jiayang	China	Institute of Genetics and Developmental Biology
2019	Lee Sang Yup	South Korea	KAIST
2019	Ho Weang Kee	Malaysia	University of Nottingham Malaysia
2019	Charissa Marcaida Ferrera	Philippines	University of the Philippines Diliman
2019	Kenji Doya	Japan	Okinawa Institute of Science and Technology
2019	Bang Yung-Jue	South Korea	Seoul National University
2019	Zakri Abdul Hamid	Malaysia	Islamic Development Bank
2019	Hiroshi Yamakawa	Japan	Japan Aerospace Exploration Agency
2019	Shih Choon Fong	Singapore	National University of Singapore
2019	Hiroki Nakatani	Japan	Keio University
2019	N. R. Narayana Murthy	India	Infosys
2019	Judith Swain	Singapore	National University of Singapore
2019	Lam Khin Yong	Singapore	Nanyang Technological University
2019	Ravi Kuchimanchi	India	Association for India's Development
2019	Chang Meemann	China	Institute of Vertebrate Paleontology and Paleoanthropology
2019	Zhao Guochun	Hong Kong	University of Hong Kong
2019	Khadg Singh Valdiya	India	Jawaharlal Nehru Centre for Advanced Scientific Research
2019	Vikram Chandra Thakur	India	Indian Academy of Sciences
2019	Toshiko Terakawa	Japan	Nagoya University
2019	Kusala Rajendran	India	Indian Institute of Science
2019	Gay Jane Perez	Philippines	University of the Philippines Diliman
2019	Sekhar Muddu	India	Indian Institute of Science
2019	Dai Jinxing	China	Chinese Academy of Sciences
2019	Wang Zeshan	China	Nanjing University of Science and Technology
2019	Rajagopalan Vasudevan	India	Thiagarajar College of Engineering
2019	Surapa Thiemjarus	Thailand	National Electronics and Computer Technology Center
2019	Amitava Roy	India	Department of Atomic Energy, India
2019	Park Nam-Gyu	South Korea	Sungkyunkwan University
2019	Hwang Cheol-Ju	South Korea	Juseong Engineering
2019	He Jinliang	China	Tsinghua University
2019	Elmer Dadios	Philippines	De La Salle University
2019	James C. C. Chan	Hong Kong	University of Hong Kong
2019	Tseng Yu-Chee	Taiwan	National Chiao Tung University
2019	Sanghamitra Bandyopadhyay	India	Indian Statistical Institute
2019	Ricardo Balog	Philippines	University of Santo Tomas
2019	Chularat Wattanakit	Thailand	Vidyasirimedhi Institute of Science and Technology
2019	Rosalinda Torres	Philippines	Department of Science and Technology
2019	Keiji Maruoka	Japan	Kyoto University
2019	Loh Teck Peng	Singapore	Nanyang Technological University
2019	Witri Wahyu Lestari	Indonesia	Sebelas Maret University
2019	Makoto Fujita	Japan	University of Tokyo
2019	Bao Xinhe	China	University of Science and Technology of China
2019	Chihaya Adachi	Japan	Kyushu University
2019	Wan Yue	Singapore	Genome Institute of Singapore
2019	Rody Sy	Philippines	University of the Philippines Manila
2019	Pankaj Manubhai Shah	India	Gujarat Cancer Society
2019	M. R. Rajagopal	India	Pallium India
2019	Varisa Pongrakhananon	Thailand	Chulalongkorn University
2019	Chanchao Lorthongpanich	Thailand	Siriraj Center of Excellence for Stem Cell Research
2019	Kazutoshi Mori	Japan	Kyoto University
2019	Koh Gou Young	South Korea	Institute for Basic Science
2019	Kim Ho Min	South Korea	KAIST
2019	Kim Beom Kyung	South Korea	Yonsei University
2019	Kim Eunjoon	South Korea	Institute for Basic Science
2019	Hou Yunde	China	Chinese Academy of Engineering
2019	Tasuku Honjo	Japan	Kyoto University
2019	Christiani Jeyakumar Henry	Singapore	National University of Singapore
2019	Stuart Cook	Singapore	Duke-NUS Medical School
2019	Zhang Dabing	China	Shanghai Jiao Tong University
2019	Xu Minggang	China	Chinese Academy of Agricultural Sciences
2019	Artemio Salazar	Philippines	University of the Philippines Los Baños
2019	Takeshi Horie	Japan	Kyoto University
2019	Soichi Arai	Japan	Tokyo University of Agriculture
2019	Amitha Bentota	Sri Lanka	Department of Agriculture, Sri Lanka
2019	Tamal Lata Aditya	Bangladesh	Bangladesh Rice Research Institute
2020	Akira Chiba	Japan	Tokyo Institute of Technology
2020	Dishant Mayurbhai Pancholi	India	Institute of Mathematical Sciences
2020	Yang Tong	Hong Kong	City University of Hong Kong
2020	Qian Qihu	China	Chinese Academy of Engineering
2020	Yasuhiko Arakawa	Japan	University of Tokyo
2020	Qi Faren	China	Beihang University
2020	Wang Xiaoyun	China	Tsinghua University
2020	Kiran Mazumdar-Shaw	India	Biocon Limited
2020	Neena Gupta	India	Indian Statistical Institute
2020	Akira Yoshino	Japan	Asahi Kasei
2020	Pham Nam Hai	Japan	Tokyo Institute of Technology
2020	Toh Kim Chuan	Singapore	National University of Singapore
2020	Phạm Hoàng Hiệp	Vietnam	Vietnam Academy of Science and Technology
2020	Shivaani Mariapun	Malaysia	University of Nottingham Malaysia
2020	Cheon Jung Hee	South Korea	Seoul National University
2020	Sankaralingam Nambi Narayanan	India	Formerly Indian Space Research Organisation
2020	Yang Chen-Ning	China	Tsinghua University
2020	Raghavan B. Sunoj	India	Indian Institute of Technology Bombay
2020	Rie Umetsu	Japan	Tohoku University
2020	Makoto Nagao	Japan	Kyoto University
2020	Govindasamy Mugesh	India	Indian Institute of Science Bangalore
2020	Yoshio Okamoto	Japan	Nagoya University
2020	Liu Yongtan	China	Chinese Academy of Sciences
2020	Tapas Kumar Maji	India	Jawaharlal Nehru Centre for Advanced Scientific Research
2020	Lim Tae-won	South Korea	Hyundai Motor Company
2020	Ho Thi Thanh Van	Vietnam	Ho Chi Minh City University of Natural Resources and Environment
2020	Frank Wang	China	SZ DJI Technology Co. Ltd.
2020	Wang Yifang	China	Institute of High Energy Physics, Chinese Academy of Sciences
2020	Maki Kawai	Japan	Institute for Molecular Science
2020	Hirotomo Nishihara	Japan	Tohoku University
2020	Saku Tsuneta	Japan	National Institutes of Natural Sciences
2020	Soumen Basak	India	National Institute of Immunology
2020	Li Zexiang	Hong Kong	Hong Kong University of Science and Technology
2020	Masahiro Hirama	Japan	Tohoku University
2020	Tran Thi Hong Hanh	Vietnam	Vietnam Academy of Science and Technology
2020	Sherry Aw	Singapore	Institute of Molecular and Cell Biology
2020	Yasuhiko Yasuda	Japan	University of Tokyo
2020	Masahide Yamaguchi	Japan	Tokyo Institute of Technology
2020	Alicia Aguinaldo	Philippines	University of Santo Tomas
2020	Emma Sales	Philippines	University of Southern Mindanao
2020	Lim Way Foong	Malaysia	Universiti Sains Malaysia
2020	Mitsutoshi Hatori	Japan	University of Tokyo
2020	Kayarat Saikrishnan	India	Indian Institute of Science Education and Research Pune
2020	Teruaki Suyama	Japan	Tokyo Institute of Technology
2020	Dhiraj Kumar	India	International Centre for Genetic Engineering and Biotechnology
2020	Lee Eun Ji	South Korea	Seoul National University
2020	Aninda Sinha	India	Indian Institute of Science Bangalore
2020	Han Buhm	South Korea	Seoul National University
2020	Manjula Reddy	India	Centre for Cellular and Molecular Biology
2020	Tadamitsu Kishimoto	Japan	Osaka University
2020	Goh Eng Lim	Singapore	Hewlett Packard Enterprise
2020	Suvrat Raju	India	Tata Institute of Fundamental Research
2020	John Wong	Singapore	National University of Singapore
2020	Yozo Fujino	Japan	Yokohama National University
2020	Mika Nomoto	Japan	Nagoya University
2020	Kim Jong Sung	South Korea	University of Ulsan
2020	Kanetada Nagamine	Japan	High Energy Accelerator Research Organization
2020	Hiroshi Takayanagi	Japan	University of Tokyo
2020	Tan Sze Tiong	Singapore	Housing and Development Board
2020	Takashi Nagasawa	Japan	Osaka University
2020	Emil Q. Javier	Philippines	Formerly the University of the Philippines System
2020	Gagandeep Kang	India	Translational Health Science and Technology Institute
2020	Lu Chao-Yang	China	University of Science and Technology of China
2020	Liao I-chiu	Taiwan	National Taiwan Ocean University
2020	Wan Iryani Wan Ismail	Malaysia	Universiti Malaysia Terengganu
2020	Shao Feng	China	National Institute of Biological Sciences
2020	Mohammad Javed Ali	India	L. V. Prasad Eye Institute
2020	Poh Hee Joo	Singapore	Institute of High Performance Computing
2020	Yoshihiro Iwasa	Japan	University of Tokyo
2020	V. Narry Kim	South Korea	Seoul National University and Institute for Basic Science
2020	Akira Isogai	Japan	University of Tokyo
2020	Cleotilde Hidalgo-How	Philippines	University of the Philippines Manila
2020	Shigeru Yoshida	Japan	Chiba University
2020	Sadao Ota	Japan	University of Tokyo
2020	Koh Wee Shing	Singapore	Institute of High Performance Computing
2020	Raul Destura	Philippines	National Institutes of Health, University of the Philippines Manila
2020	Carlo Arcilla	Philippines	Philippine Nuclear Research Institute
2020	Ryoichi Horisaki	Japan	Osaka University
2020	Aya Ishihara	Japan	Chiba University
2020	Saw Seang Mei	Singapore	Singapore Eye Research Institute
2020	Manik Varma	India	Microsoft Research India
2020	Joselito R. Chavez	Philippines	National Kidney and Transplant Institute
2020	Shankar Ghosh	India	Tata Institute of Fundamental Research
2020	Audrey Chia	Singapore	Singapore Eye Research Institute
2020	Fachmin Folianto	Singapore	Institute for Infocomm Research
2020	Zhou Yan	Singapore	Nanyang Technological University
2020	Oh Uhtaek	South Korea	Korea Institute of Science and Technology
2020	Muhammad Faryad	Pakistan	Lahore University of Management Sciences
2020	Roger Beuerman	Singapore	Singapore Eye Research Institute
2020	Donald Tan	Singapore	Singapore Eye Research Institute
2020	Tang Ching Wan	Hong Kong	Hong Kong University of Science and Technology
2020	Subimal Ghosh	India	Indian Institute of Technology Bombay
2020	Alonzo Gabriel	Philippines	University of the Philippines Diliman
2020	Robert Dizon	Philippines	Metals Industry Research and Development Center
2020	Basudeb Dasgupta	India	Tata Institute of Fundamental Research
2020	Raymond Tan	Philippines	De La Salle University
2020	Susan Gallardo	Philippines	De La Salle University
2020	Pham Thi Thu Ha	Vietnam	Tôn Đức Thắng University
2020	Sunita Sarawagi	India	Indian Institute of Technology Bombay
2020	Makoto Fujita	Japan	University of Tokyo
2021	Tomifumi Godai	Japan	Japan Aerospace Exploration Agency
2021	Meng Zhizhong	China	Chinese Academy of Engineering
2021	Yu Menglun	China	Chinese Academy of Sciences
2021	K. Sivan	India	Indian Space Research Organization
2021	Byrana Nagappa Suresh	India	Indian Space Research Organization
2021	Chew Bee Lynn	Malaysia	University of Science Malaysia
2021	Desiree M. Hautea	Philippines	University of the Philippines Los Baños
2021	Salma Sultana	Bangladesh	Model Livestock Advancement Foundation
2021	Tran Thi Thu Ha	Vietnam	Thái Nguyên University
2021	Rajeev Kumar Varshney	India	International Crops Research Institute for the Semi-Arid Tropics
2021	Ritesh Agarwal	India	Postgraduate Institute of Medical Education and Research
2021	Bushra Ateeq	India	Indian Institute of Technology Kanpur
2021	Dario Campana	Singapore	National University of Singapore
2021	Ananlada Chotimongkol	Thailand	National Science and Technology Development Agency
2021	Salvacion Gatchalian	Philippines	Research Institute for Tropical Medicine
2021	Ju Young Seok	South Korea	KAIST
2021	Tadamitsu Kishimoto	Japan	Osaka University
2021	K. Ranga Rama Krishnan	Singapore	National Medical Research Council
2021	Vuong Thi Ngoc Lan	Vietnam	Ho Chi Minh City Medicine and Pharmacy University
2021	Tsering Landol	India	Sonam Norboo Memorial Government Hospital
2021	Le Thi Quynh Mai	Vietnam	National Institute of Hygiene and Epidemiology
2021	Lee Jae Won	South Korea	University of Ulsan
2021	Lee Won Jae	South Korea	Seoul National University
2021	Lee Yong-ho	South Korea	Yonsei University
2021	Liu Jianjun	Singapore	Genome Institute of Singapore and A*STAR
2021	Dennis Lo	Hong Kong	Chinese University of Hong Kong
2021	Hiroyuki Mano	Japan	National Cancer Center Research Institute
2021	Sandra Teresa V. Navarra	Philippines	University of Santo Tomas Hospital
2021	Park Seung-jung	South Korea	University of Ulsan
2021	Andani Eka Putra	Indonesia	Andalas University
2021	Firdausi Qadri	Bangladesh	International Centre for Diarrhoeal Disease and Research
2021	Qiao Jie	China	Peking University
2021	Eiichi Saitoh	Japan	Fujita Health University
2021	Mitinori Saitou	Japan	Kyoto University
2021	Shimon Sakaguchi	Japan	Osaka University
2021	Arunee Thitithanyanont	Thailand	Mahidol University
2021	Wang Chen	China	Chinese Academy of Medical Sciences
2021	Wong Tien Yin	Singapore	Singapore National Eye Center
2021	Zhong Nanshan	China	First Affiliated Hospital of Guangzhou Medical University
2021	Biman Bagchi	India	Indian Institute of Science
2021	Chen Xiao-Ming	China	Sun Yat-Sen University
2021	Jyotirmayee Dash	India	Indian Association for the Cultivation of Science
2021	Subi Jacob George	India	Jawaharlal Nehru Centre for Advanced Scientific Research
2021	Kim Dong-ho	South Korea	Yonsei University
2021	Thalappil Pradeep	India	Indian Institute of Technology Madras
2021	Kathleen B. Aviso	Philippines	De La Salle University
2021	Annabelle V. Briones	Philippines	Department of Science and Technology
2021	Choi Haecheon	South Korea	Seoul National University
2021	Kinshuk Dasgupta	India	Bhabha Atomic Research Centre
2021	Huang Xuhua	China	Chinese Academy of Sciences
2021	Champika Ellawala Kankanamge	Sri Lanka	University of Ruhuna
2021	Amol Arvindrao Kulkarni	India	National Chemical Laboratory
2021	Jun Murai	Japan	Keio University
2021	Shin Mikyung	South Korea	Sungkyunkwan University
2021	Samia Subrina	Bangladesh	Bangladesh University of Engineering and Technology
2021	Subra Suresh	Singapore	Nanyang Technological University
2021	Francis Aldrine Uy	Philippines	Mapúa University
2021	Edgardo G. Vazquez	Philippines	Vazbuilt Technology
2021	Huh Youm	South Korea	Silicon Mitus
2021	Tsuneo Okada	Japan	University of Tokyo
2021	Suryendu Dutta	India	Indian Institute of Technology Bombay
2021	Hong Song-You	South Korea	Korea Institute of Atmospheric Prediction Systems
2021	Abhijit Mukherjee	India	Indian Institute of Technology Kharagpur
2021	Minoru Ozima	Japan	University of Tokyo
2021	Zeng Qingcun	China	Chinese Academy of Sciences
2021	Chan Yoke-Fun	Malaysia	University of Malaya
2021	Shubhadeep Chatterjee	India	Centre for DNA Fingerprinting and Diagnostics
2021	Kenya Honda	Japan	Keio University
2021	Kim Se-Kwon	South Korea	Pukyong National University
2021	Kiyoshi Kita	Japan	Nagasaki University
2021	Atsushi Miyawaki	Japan	RIKEN Center for Brain Science
2021	Rui Bai	China	Westlake University
2021	Jonel Saludes	Philippines	University of San Agustin
2021	Teruo Sano	Japan	Hirosaki University
2021	Kazuo Shinozaki	Japan	RIKEN Center for Sustainable Resource Science
2021	Masatoshi Takeichi	Japan	Kyoto University
2021	Vatsala Thirumalai	India	National Centre for Biological Sciences
2021	Wang Xiaodong	China	National Institute of Biological Sciences Beijing
2021	Wang Zhenyi	China	Shanghai Jiaotong University
2021	Zhang Tingdong	China	Harbin Medical University
2021	Naruporn Monmaturapoj	Thailand	National Science and Technology Development Agency
2021	Lu Ke	China	Chinese Academy of Sciences
2021	Shobhana Narasimhan	India	Jawaharlal Nehru Centre for Advanced Scientific Research
2021	Wang Weihua	China	Chinese Academy of Sciences
2021	U. K. Anandavardhanan	India	Indian Institute of Technology Bombay
2021	Rajat Subhra Hazra	India	Indian Statistical Institute Kolkata
2021	M. S. Narasimhan	India	Tata Institute of Fundamental Research
2021	Peng Shige	China	Shandong University
2021	Pham Tien Son	Vietnam	Dalat University
2021	Chong Yidong	Singapore	Nanyang Technological University
2021	Zhang Baile	Singapore	Nanyang Technological University
2021	Nikolay Zheludev	Singapore	Nanyang Technological University Singapore and University of Southampton, UK
2021	Surajit Dhara	India	University of Hyderabad
2021	Rajesh Ganapathy	India	International Centre for Material Science
2021	Atsuko Ichikawa	Japan	Kyoto University
2021	Loh Huanqian	Singapore	National University of Singapore
2021	Lu Chao-Yang	China	University of Science and Technology of China
2021	Nguyen Truong Thanh Hieu	Vietnam	Tôn Đức Thắng University
2021	Hyeon K. Park	South Korea	Ulsan National Institute of Science and Technology
2021	Jiang Ying	China	Peking University
2022	Nur Adlyka Binti Ainul Annuar	Malaysia	Universiti Kebangsaan Malaysia
2022	Gu Songfen	China	Aviation Industry Corporation of China
2022	Kanak Saha	India	Inter-University Centre for Astronomy and Astrophysics
2022	Shen Yanan	China	University of Science and Technology of China
2022	Lucille V. Abad	Philippines	Philippine Nuclear Research Institute
2022	Sahadev Sharma	Malaysia	Universiti Malaya
2022	Adrian Ybañez	Philippines	Cebu Technological University
2022	Suwussa Bamrungsap	Thailand	National Science and Technology Development Agency
2022	Cheong Sok Ching	Malaysia	Cancer Research Malaysia
2022	Nina G. Gloriani	Philippines	University of the Philippines Manila
2022	Sir Peter Gluckman	Singapore	Agency for Science, Technology and Research
2022	Ivy Ng	Singapore	SingHealth
2022	Toshiaki Hisada	Japan	University of Tokyo
2022	Seiryo Suguira	Japan	University of Tokyo
2022	Hailan Hu	China	Zhejiang University
2022	Truong Thanh Huong	Vietnam	Hanoi Medical University
2022	Hidenori Ichijo	Japan	University of Tokyo
2022	Kazuhiro Iwai	Japan	Kyoto University
2022	Kim Jin-Hong	South Korea	Seoul National University
2022	V. Narry Kim	South Korea	Seoul National University and Institute for Basic Science
2022	Koo Bon-Kwon	South Korea	Seoul National University
2022	Lydia R. Leonardo	Philippines	University of the Philippines Manila
2022	Jeemon Panniyammakal	India	Sree Chitra Tirunal Institute for Medical Sciences and Technology
2022	Firdausi Qadri	Bangladesh	International Centre for Diarrhoeal Disease Research
2022	Juthamas Ratanavaraporn	Thailand	Chulalongkorn University
2022	Too Heng-Phon	Singapore	National University of Singapore
2022	Yoo Changhoon	South Korea	Asan Medical Center
2022	Bai Chunli	China	Chinese Academy of Sciences
2022	Baik Mu-Hyun	South Korea	KAIST
2022	Kanishka Biswas	India	Jawaharlal Nehru Centre for Advanced Scientific Research
2022	Thimmaiah Govindaraju	India	Jawaharlal Nehru Centre for Advanced Scientific Research
2022	Zubair Hasan	Bangladesh	East West University
2022	Kyoko Nozaki	Japan	University of Tokyo
2022	Wong Chi-Huey	Taiwan	Institute of Biotechnology and Medicine Industry
2022	Boonyawan Yoosuk	Thailand	National Science and Technology Development Agency
2022	Anthony James Bautista	Philippines	University of Santo Tomas
2022	Chen Xiaodong	Singapore	Nanyang Technological University
2022	Chin Dae-je	South Korea	SkyLake Investment Co.
2022	Pawan Kumar Goenka	India	Mahindra & Mahindra Ltd.
2022	Jeong Han	South Korea	i3 Systems
2022	Philip T. Krein	China	Zhejiang University
2022	Lee Sang Yup	South Korea	KAIST
2022	Joey D. Ocon	Philippines	University of the Philippines Diliman
2022	Aditya Sadhanala	India	Indian Institute of Science
2022	Rohit Srivastava	India	Indian Institute of Technology Bombay
2022	Su Guaning	Singapore	Nanyang Technological University
2022	Simon Sze	Taiwan	National Yang Ming Chiao Tung University
2022	Guillermo Q. Tabios III	Philippines	University of the Philippines Diliman
2022	Dian Burhani	Indonesia	Indonesian Institute of Sciences
2022	Asuncion B. De Guzman	Philippines	Mindanao State University Naawan Foundation for Science and Technology Development
2022	Guo Huadong	China	Chinese Academy of Sciences
2022	Li Hongying	Singapore	Agency for Science, Technology and Research
2022	Lin Yi-Yi	Taiwan	National Taiwan University
2022	Narendra Ojha	India	Physical Research Laboratory
2022	Binoy Kumar Saikia	India	North East Institute of Science and Technology
2022	Neni Sintawardani	Indonesia	Indonesian Institute of Sciences
2022	Chen Yun-Nung	Taiwan	National Taiwan University
2022	Kunihiko Fukushima	Japan	Fuzzy Logic Systems Institute
2022	Debdeep Mukhopadhyay	India	Indian Institute of Technology Kharagpur
2022	Zhang Hanwang	Singapore	Nanyang Technological University, Singapore
2022	Andrew Chi-Chih Yao	China	Tsinghua University
2022	Raymond W. Yeung	Hong Kong	Chinese University of Hong Kong
2022	Sudkate Chaiyo	Thailand	Chulalongkorn University
2022	Guan Yi	Hong Kong	University of Hong Kong
2022	Joseph Sriyal Malik Peiris	Hong Kong	University of Hong Kong
2022	Kaang Bong-Kiun	South Korea	Seoul National University
2022	Yuji Kamiya	Japan	RIKEN
2022	Kang Le	China	Hebei University
2022	Sarah Luo	Singapore	Agency for Science, Technology and Research
2022	Atsushi Miyawaki	Japan	RIKEN
2022	Arun Kumar Shukla	India	Indian Institute of Technology Kanpur
2022	Amit Singh	India	Indian Institute of Science, Bengaluru
2022	Mikiko Tanaka	Japan	Tokyo Institute of Technology
2022	Tsay Yi-Fang	Taiwan	Academia Sinica
2022	Wang Linfa	Singapore	Duke-NUS Medical School
2022	Yuen Kwok-yung	Hong Kong	University of Hong Kong
2022	Liu Bin	Singapore	National University of Singapore
2022	Imalka Munaweera	Sri Lanka	University of Sri Jayewardenepura
2022	Vinich Promarak	Thailand	Vidyasirmedhi Institute
2022	Thirumalai Venkatesan	Singapore	National University of Singapore
2022	Wu Hsin-Jay	Taiwan	National Yang Ming Chiao Tung University
2022	Khongorzul Dorjgotov	Mongolia	National University of Mongolia
2022	Anish Ghosh	India	Tata Institute of Fundamental Research
2022	Neena Gupta	India	Indian Statistical Institute
2022	June Huh	South Korea	Korea Institute for Advanced Study
2022	Shihoko Ishii	Japan	University of Tokyo
2022	Takurō Mochizuki	Japan	Kyoto University
2022	Makiko Sasada	Japan	University of Tokyo
2022	Saket Saurabh	India	Tata Institute of Fundamental Research
2022	Teerapong Suksumran	Thailand	Chiang Mai University
2022	Yvonne Gao	Singapore	National University of Singapore
2022	Hahm Taik Soo	South Korea	Seoul National University
2022	Kenichi Iga	Japan	Tokyo Institute of Technology
2022	Hidetoshi Katori	Japan	RIKEN
2022	Shunsuke Kobayashi	Japan	Tokyo University of Science Yamaguchi
2022	Tatsuo Uchida	Japan	Tohoku University
2022	Wang Dazhong	China	Chinese Academy of Sciences
2022	Haruki Watanabe	Japan	University of Tokyo
2022	Yao Wang	Hong Kong	University of Hong Kong
2022	Zhang Jie	China	Chinese Academy of Sciences
2023	Byrana Nagappa Suresh	India	Indian Institute of Space Science and Technology
2023	Wing-Huen Ip	Taiwan	National Central University
2023	Zhusheng Liu	China	China Academy of Launch Vehicle Technology
2023	Nissim Kanekar	India	Tata Institute of Fundamental Research
2023	Riffat Shamshad	Pakistan	Space and Upper Atmosphere Research Commission
2023	Mahalingam Govindaraj	India	Consultative Group for International Agricultural Research
2023	Parveen Chhuneja	India	Punjab Agricultural University
2023	Phung Le Thi Kim	Vietnam	Ho Chi Minh City University of Technology
2023	Roel R. Suralta	Philippines	Philippine Rice Research Institute
2023	Umara Sahara Rana	Pakistan	University of Agriculture
2023	Daoxin Xie	China	Tsinghua University
2023	Adeeba Kamarulzaman	Malaysia	University of Malaya
2023	Beverly Lorraine Ho	Philippines	Department of Health
2023	Chathuranga Ranasinghe	Sri Lanka	University of Colombo
2023	Gagandeep Kang	India	Christian Medical College
2023	Tadashi Hattori	Japan	Asia-Pacific Prevention of Blindness Association
2023	Wanjin Hong	Singapore	Agency for Science, Technology and Research
2023	Hailan Hu	China	Zhejiang University
2023	Kaori Sugihara	Japan	University of Tokyo
2023	Haruo Kasai	Japan	International Research Center for Neurointelligence
2023	Jeong Min Lee	South Korea	Seoul National University
2023	Muhammad Iqbal Choudhury	Pakistan	University of Karachi
2023	Pia Bagamasbad	Philippines	University of the Philippines Diliman
2023	Ritu Trivedi	India	Central Drug Research Institute
2023	Shin Eui-Cheol	South Korea	KAIST
2023	Erwei Song	China	Sun Yat-sen University of Medical Sciences
2023	Uzma Batool	Pakistan	Shaafi International Hospital
2023	Yasuka Toda	Japan	Meiji University
2023	Chunying Chen	China	National Center for Nanoscience and Technology
2023	David P. Penaloza Jr.	Philippines	De La Salle University
2023	Ganapati Dadasaheb Yadav	India	Institute of Chemical Technology Mumbai
2023	Ho Thi Thanh Van	Vietnam	Ho Chi Minh City University of Natural Resources and Environment
2023	Joseph Auresenia	Philippines	De La Salle University
2023	Ming Joo Koh	Singapore	National University of Singapore
2023	Sukbok Chang	South Korea	Institute for Basic Science
2023	Ashani Savinda Ranathunga	Sri Lanka	University of Moratuwa
2023	Athanasia Amanda Septevani	Indonesia	National Research and Innovation Agency
2023	Renzhe Bi	Singapore	Agency for Science, Technology and Research
2023	Bui Xuan Thanh	Vietnam	Vietnam National University Ho Chi Minh City
2023	Erika Fille Legara	Philippines	Asian Institute of Management
2023	Daining Fang	China	Beijing Institute of Technology
2023	Gurumoorthy Bhuvaneswari	India	Indian Institute of Technology Delhi
2023	Keisha Alena Mayuga	Philippines	Life Cycles
2023	Wook Hyun Kwon	South Korea	Seoul National University
2023	Ravindra Kulkarni	India	Elkay Chemicals Private Limited
2023	Rinlee Butch M. Cervera	Philippines	University of the Philippines Diliman
2023	Sang Kyun Cha	South Korea	Seoul National University
2023	Sanghamitra Bandyopadhyay	India	Indian Statistical Institute
2023	Siriwan Suebnukarn	Thailand	Thammasat University
2023	Ching Cheong Sok	Malaysia	Digital Health Research Unit of Cancer Research
2023	Supiya Charoensiriwath	Thailand	National Electronics and Computer Technology Centre Thailand
2023	Tessy Thomas	India	Defense Research and Development Organization
2023	Keh-Chyuan Tsai	Taiwan	National Taiwan University
2023	Hsiao-Wen Zan	Taiwan	National University of Yang Ming Chiao
2023	Ayako Abe-Ouchi	Japan	University of Tokyo
2023	Aletta Yñiguez	Philippines	University of the Philippines
2023	Allan Gil S. Fernando	Philippines	University of the Philippines
2023	Anna Oposa	Philippines	Save Philippine Seas
2023	Kasturi Devi Kanniah	Malaysia	University of Technology Malaysia
2023	Mario Juan A. Aurelio	Philippines	University of the Philippines
2023	Naohiko Ohkouchi	Japan	Research Institute for Marine Resources Utilization
2023	P.S. Biju	India	Meteorological Centre, Thiruvananthapuram
2023	Suk-ju Kang	South Korea	Sogang University
2023	Suman Chakraborty	India	Indian Institute of Technology
2023	Hongjiang Zhang	China	Carlyle Group
2023	Asako Noguchi	Japan	University of Tokyo
2023	Asha de Vos	Sri Lanka	Oceanswell
2023	Lanfen Chen	China	Xiamen University
2023	Ruey-Hwa Chen	Taiwan	Academia Sinica
2023	Dennis Lo	Hong Kong	Chinese University of Hong Kong
2023	Edwin Atabay	Philippines	Philippine Carabao Centre
2023	Haruka Sasaki	Japan	Tohoku University
2023	Hsueh Yen-Ping	Taiwan	Academia Sinica
2023	Hsou-min Li	Taiwan	Academia Sinica
2023	Wenhui Li	China	National Institute of Biological Sciences
2023	Moti Lal Madan	India	Indian Council of Agricultural Research
2023	Rohan Pethiyagoda	Sri Lanka	-
2023	Senjuti Saha	Bangladesh	Child Health Research Foundation
2023	Subbanna Ayyappan	India	Karnataka Science and Technology Academy
2023	Vidita Vaidya	India	Tata Institute of Fundamental Research
2023	Ai Kohata	Japan	University of Tokyo
2023	Haruna Katayama	Japan	-
2023	Bin Liu	Singapore	National University of Singapore
2023	Yong-Young Noh	South Korea	Pohang University of Science and Technology
2023	Mahesh Kakde	India	Indian Institute of Science
2023	Ngaiming Mok	Hong Kong	University of Hong Kong
2023	Sohail Nadeem	Pakistan	Quaid-i-Azam University
2023	Mayuko Yamashita	Japan	Research Institute of Mathematical Science, Kyoto University
2023	Oh Yong-Geun	South Korea	Institute for Basic Science
2023	Chandana Jayaratne	Sri Lanka	University of Colombo
2023	Kimiko Sekiguchi	Japan	Tokyo Institute of Technology
2023	Xueming Yang	China	Chinese Academy of Sciences
2023	Chhim Sotheara	Cambodia	Transcultural Psychosocial Organization
2023	Gary Bencheghib	Indonesia	Sungei Watch
2023	Gawsia Wahidunnessa Chowdhury	Bangladesh	University of Dhaka
2023	Glenn Banaguas	Philippines	Environmental and Climate Change Research Institute
2023	Ka Yi Ling	Singapore	Shiok Meats
2023	Sandhya Sriram	Singapore	Shiok Meats
2023	Yong-Guan Zhu	China	Chinese Academy of Sciences
2023	Rong Wang	Singapore	Nanyang Technological University, Singapore
2024	Hiroko Miyahara	Japan	Musashino Art University
2024	Jinbin Cao	China	Beihang University
2024	Mayu Tominaga	Japan	University of Tokyo
2024	Reinabelle Reyes	Philippines	University of the Philippines Diliman
2024	Xu Xing	China	Institute of Vertebrate Paleontology and Paleoanthropology
2024	Eugenio Lemos	Timor-Leste	Permakultura Timor Lorosa’e (Permatil)
2024	Hoang Thi Giang	Vietnam	Vietnam Institute of Agricultural Genetics
2024	Khalisanni Khalid	Malaysia	Malaysian Agricultural Research and Development Institute
2024	Renuka Attanayake	Sri Lanka	University of Kelaniya
2024	Saqib Arif	Pakistan	Pakistan Agricultural Research Council
2024	Swati Nayak	India	International Rice Research Institute, South Asia headquarters
2024	Anurag Singh Rathore	India	Indian Institute of Technology in Delhi
2024	Aung Tin	Singapore	Singapore National Eye Centre
2024	Jang-Soo Chun	South Korea	Gwangju Institute of Science and Technology
2024	Hiroaki Suga	Japan	University of Tokyo
2024	Yoon-Koo Kang	South Korea	Asan Medical Center
2024	Lan Wang	Hong Kong	Hong Kong University of Science and Technology
2024	Lim Chwee Teck	Singapore	National University of Singapore
2024	Lourdes Capito	Philippines	-
2024	Maria Corazon De Ungria	Philippines	University of the Philippines Diliman
2024	Mariatulqabtiah Abdul Razak	Malaysia	Universiti Putra Malaysia
2024	Masashi Yanagisawa	Japan	University of Tsukuba
2024	Nadiah Abu	Malaysia	Universiti Kebangsaan Malaysia
2024	Neerja Bhatla	India	All India Institute of Medical Sciences, New Delhi
2024	Prasit Palittapongarnpim	Thailand	Mahidol University
2024	Samawansha Harsheni Tennakoon	Sri Lanka	Sri Jayewardenepura University
2024	Fu-Chan Wei	Taiwan	Chang Gung Memorial Hospital
2024	Yumi Tsutsumi	Japan	Osaka University
2024	Hongping He	China	Chinese Academy of Sciences
2024	Imalka Munaweera	Sri Lanka	University of Sri Jayewardenepura
2024	Jyotirmayee Mohanty	India	Bhabha Atomic Research Centre, Mumbai
2024	Naoya Kumagai	Japan	Keio University
2024	Sri Fatmawati	Indonesia	Institut Teknologi Sepuluh Nopember
2024	Subhangi Subedi	Nepal	Tribhuvan University
2024	Suojiang Zhang	China	Institute of Process Engineering
2024	Ahmad Fauzi Ismail	Malaysia	Universiti Teknologi Malaysia
2024	Can Li	Hong Kong	University of Hong Kong
2024	Charlle Sy	Philippines	De La Salle University
2024	Jagath Manatunge	Sri Lanka	University of Moratuwa
2024	Hiroyuki Matsunami	Japan	Kyoto University
2024	Mohd Sapuan Salit	Malaysia	Universiti Putra Malaysia
2024	Yuichi Ikuhara	Japan	University of Tokyo
2024	Naoya Shibata	Japan	University of Tokyo
2024	Pornnapa Kasemsiri	Thailand	Khon Kaen University
2024	Sohaib Manzoor	Pakistan	Mirpur University
2024	Imran Aziz	Pakistan	Mirpur University
2024	Xiao Lin Zhao	Hong Kong	Hong Kong Polytechnic University
2024	Yang-Kook Sun	South Korea	Hanyang University
2024	Fang-Jie Zhao	China	Nanjing Agricultural University
2024	Hongbing Yu	China	Nankai University
2024	Juan Liu	China	Peking University
2024	Purnananda Guptasarma	India	Indian Institute of Science Education and Research in Mohali
2024	Shilpi Sharma	India	Indian Institute of Technology in Delhi
2024	Shuichang Zhang	China	Research Institute of Petroleum Exploration and Development
2024	Theeranun Siritanon	Thailand	Suranaree University of Technology
2024	Tulshi Laxmi Suwal	Nepal	Small Mammals Conservation and Research Foundation
2024	Anwarul Islam	Bangladesh	University of Dhaka
2024	Christopher P. Monterola	Philippines	Asian Institute of Management
2024	Jianhua Zhang	China	Beijing University of Posts and Telecommunications
2024	Masataka Nakazawa	Japan	Tohoku University
2024	Kazuo Hagimoto	Japan	National Institute of Information and Communications Technology
2024	Nurdahalia Lairing	Indonesia	University of Muhammadiyah Enrekang
2024	Sachchida Nand Tripathi	India	Indian Institute of Technology Kanpur
2024	Sumei Sun	Singapore	Institute for Infocomm Research
2024	Alifa Bintha Haque	Bangladesh	University of Dhaka
2024	Arun Kumar Shukla	India	Indian Institute of Technology Kanpur
2024	Jiyoung Park	South Korea	Ulsan National Institute of Science and Technology
2024	Kazuo Shinozaki	Japan	RIKEN Center for Sustainable Resource Science
2024	Kazuko Yamaguchi-Shinozaki	Japan	Tokyo NODAI Research Institute
2024	Pantana Tor-Ngern	Thailand	Chulalongkorn University
2024	Supriya Sharma	Nepal	Tribhuvan University
2024	Suyanee Thongchot	Thailand	Siriraj Hospital, Mahidol University
2024	Tsay Yi-Fang	Taiwan	Institute of Molecular Biology
2024	Raghavan Varadarajan	India	Indian Institute of Science
2024	Tserendorj Munkhjargal	Mongolia	Mongolian University of Life Sciences
2024	Carmencita M. David-Padilla	Philippines	University of the Philippines
2024	Gim Pew Quek	Singapore	Ministry of Defense
2024	Kai Leng	Hong Kong	Hong Kong Polytechnic University
2024	Bin Liu	Singapore	National University of Singapore
2024	Zheng Liu	Singapore	Nanyang Technological University
2024	Madhavi Srinivasan	Singapore	Nanyang Technological University
2024	Xiaohong Qin	China	Donghua University
2024	Cheng-Wei Qiu	Singapore	National University of Singapore
2024	Apoorva Khare	India	Indian Institute of Science, Bangalore
2024	Mayuko Yamashita	Japan	Kyoto University
2024	Suntharalingam Thirukkanesh	Sri Lanka	Eastern University
2024	Tran Quang Hoa	Vietnam	Hue University of Education
2024	Jiangong You	China	Nanjing University
2024	Punniamoorthy Ravirajan	Sri Lanka	University of Jaffna
2024	Jisoon Ihm	South Korea	Pohang University of Science and Technology
2024	Jueinai Kwo	Taiwan	National Tsing Hua University
2024	Mukund Thattai	India	National Centre for Biological Sciences
2024	Thiti Bovornratanaraks	Thailand	Chulalongkorn University
2024	Vijay B. Shenoy	India	Indian Institute of Science, Bangalore
2024	Yasunobu Nakamura	Japan	RIKEN Center for Quantum Computing
2024	Jaw-Shen Tsai	Japan	RIKEN Center for Quantum Computing
2024	Zhong Lin Wang	China	Beijing Institute of Nanoenergy and Nanosystems
2024	Alison Kim Shan Wee	Malaysia	University of Nottingham Malaysia
2024	Delima Silalahi	Indonesia	Community Initiative Development and Study Group
2024	Yaohui Zhao	China	Peking University
2025	Annapurni Subramaniam	India	Indian Institute of Astrophysics
2025	Di Li	China	National Astronomical Observatories of the Chinese Academy of Sciences
2025	Kana Moriwaki	Japan	University of Tokyo
2025	Sarah Quraishi	Pakistan	Aero Engine Craft
2025	Satoshi Miyazaki	Japan	National Astronomical Observatory of Japan
2025	Masamune Oguri	Japan	Chiba University
2025	Acga Cheng	Malaysia	Universiti Malaya
2025	Boon Chin Tan	Malaysia	Universiti Malaya
2025	C. Anandharamakrishnan	India	National Institute for Interdisciplinary Science and Technology
2025	Dissanayake D.C.T.	Sri Lanka	University of Sri Jayewardenepura
2025	Ghulam Muhammad Ali	Pakistan	Pakistan Agricultural Research Council
2025	Rachma Wikandari	Indonesia	Gadjah Mada University
2025	Sithichoke Tangphatsornruang	Thailand	National Center for Genetic Engineering and Biotechnology
2025	Chang-Hsien Yu	Taiwan	Taitung Mackay Memorial Hospital
2025	Changjoon Justin Lee	South Korea	Institute for Basic Science
2025	Charles Pin-Kuang Lai	Taiwan	Institute of Atomic and Molecular Sciences, Academia Sinica
2025	Elena Azizan	Malaysia	Universiti Kebangsaan Malaysia
2025	Frienson Pradhan	Nepal	Kathmandu University
2025	Govindarajan Padmanabhan	India	Indian Institute of Science
2025	Harishankar Das	Bangladesh	Bangladesh Medical University
2025	Hei Ming Lai	Hong Kong	Chinese University of Hong Kong
2025	Inkyung Jung	South Korea	Korea Advanced Institute of Science and Technology
2025	Jia Wern Pan	Malaysia	Cancer Research Malaysia
2025	Malini Olivo	Singapore	A*STAR Skin Research Labs
2025	Gurpreet Singh	Singapore	A*STAR Skin Research Labs
2025	Renzhe Bi	Singapore	A*STAR Skin Research Labs
2025	Augustine Tee	Singapore	Changi General Hospital
2025	Yan Ning	China	Tsinghua University
2025	Rohit Srivastava	India	Indian Institute of Technology Bombay
2025	Tak Kyu Oh	South Korea	Seoul National University Bundang Hospital
2025	Ho Weang Kee	Malaysia	University of Nottingham Malaysia
2025	Won Young Kim	South Korea	University of Ulsan College of Medicine
2025	Hairong Lyu	Hong Kong	Chinese University of Hong Kong
2025	Jer-Lai Kuo	Taiwan	Institute of Atomic and Molecular Sciences, Academia Sinica
2025	Junichiro Yamaguchi	Japan	Waseda University
2025	Kei Ota	Japan	Kindai University
2025	Xiang David Li	Hong Kong	University of Hong Kong
2025	Angelo Earvin Sy Choi	Philippines	De La Salle University
2025	Deog-Kyoon Jeong	South Korea	Seoul National University
2025	Jiyun Lee	South Korea	Korea Advanced Institute of Science and Technology
2025	Kim Meow Liew	Hong Kong	City University of Hong Kong
2025	Prasanti Widyasih Sarli	Indonesia	Bandung Institute of Technology
2025	Samia Subrina	Bangladesh	Bangladesh University of Engineering and Technology
2025	Tsai Ming-Kai	Taiwan	MediaTek
2025	Tsutomu Miyasaka	Japan	Toin University of Yokohama
2025	Brinda Kashyap	India	Wildlife Researcher
2025	Farwiza Farhan	Indonesia	Yayasan Hutan Alam dan Lingkungan Aceh (HAkA)
2025	Hernando P. Bacosa	Philippines	Mindanao State University–Iligan Institute of Technology
2025	Joy Jacqueline Pereira	Malaysia	Malaysian Network for Research on Climate, Environment and Development
2025	Kazushige Obara	Japan	University of Tokyo
2025	Mubarak Ahmad Khan	Bangladesh	Bangladesh Academy of Sciences
2025	Purabi Saikia	India	Banaras Hindu University
2025	Raju Acharya	Nepal	Friends of Nature
2025	Rinzin Phunjok Lama	Nepal	Independent Conservation Biologist
2025	Shirani Manel Kumari Widana Gamage	Sri Lanka	University of Ruhuna
2025	Tasrina Rabia Choudhury	Bangladesh	Bangladesh Atomic Energy Commission
2025	Xin Ying Kong	Singapore	Nanyang Technological University
2025	Bolor-Ujin Badraa	Mongolia	Khan Bank Mongolia
2025	Fiona Fui-Hoon Nah	Hong Kong	City University of Hong Kong
2025	Shailendra Giri	Nepal	Rapti Engineering College
2025	Usman Qamar	Pakistan	National University of Sciences and Technology
2025	Chee-Onn Leong	Malaysia	AGTC Genomics
2025	Emi Ito	Japan	Osaka University
2025	Lilian P. Villamor	Philippines	Philippine Carabao Center
2025	Purnima Devi Barman	India	Avifauna Research and Conservation Division
2025	Siddhesh Kamat	India	Indian Institute of Science Education and Research
2025	Tomoko Sakai	Japan	Kyoto University
2025	Wanilada Rungrassamee	Thailand	National Center for Genetic Engineering and Biotechnology
2025	Abu Bakar Suleiman	Malaysia	IMU University
2025	Myung-Ju Ahn	South Korea	Sungkyunkwan University School of Medicine
2025	Nguyen Thi Ngoc Phuong	Vietnam	Tu Du Obstetrics and Gynecology Hospital
2025	Richard Parker	Singapore	Singapore Aerospace Programme, A*STAR
2025	Teck-Hua Ho	Singapore	Nanyang Technological University
2025	Vishna Devi Nadarajah	Malaysia	Newcastle University Medicine Malaysia
2025	Wynne Hsu	Singapore	National University of Singapore
2025	Ai Serizawa	Japan	Shibaura Institute of Technology
2025	Bin Liu	Singapore	National University of Singapore
2025	Cui Tiejun	China	Southeast University
2025	Zhisheng Zhao	China	Yanshan University
2025	Sun Binyong	China	Zhejiang University
2025	Neena Gupta	India	Indian Statistical Institute
2025	Renier G. Mendoza	Philippines	University of the Philippines Diliman
2025	Ruochuan Liu	China	Peking University
2025	Yoshiko Ogata	Japan	Kyoto University
2025	Atsuko Ichikawa	Japan	Tohoku University
2025	Avesh Kumar Tyagi	India	Bhabha Atomic Research Centre
2025	Deleg Sangaa	Mongolia	Mongolian Academy of Sciences
2025	Haruka Tanji	Japan	University of Electronic Communications
2025	Ping Xu	China	National University of Defense Technology
2025	Se-Young Jeong	South Korea	Pusan National University
2025	Xin-Nian Wang	China	Central China Normal University
2025	Yi Yang	Hong Kong	University of Hong Kong
2025	Alok Shukla	India	Chhattisgarh Bachao Aandolan
2025	Amartya Mukhopadhyay	India	Indian Institute of Technology Bombay
2025	Chin Wei Lai	Malaysia	Universiti Malaya
2025	Deliana Dahnum	Indonesia	National Research and Innovation Agency
2025	Pongkarn Chakthranont	Thailand	National Science and Technology Development Agency
2025	Taikan Oki	Japan	University of Tokyo
2025	Tista Prasai Joshi	Nepal	Nepal Academy of Science and Technology
2025	Waleeporn Donphai	Thailand	Kasetsart University
2026	Kanako Seki	Japan	The University of Tokyo
2026	Linyi Liu	China	Aerospace Information Research Institute of the Chinese Academy of Sciences
2026	S. Somanath	India	Indian Space Research Organisation
2026	Yuli Chen	China	Beihang University
2026	Della Rahmawati	Indonesia	Swiss German University
2026	Marcela M. Navasero	Philippines	University of the Philippines Los Baños
2026	Marjana Akter	Bangladesh	Bangladesh Agricultural University
2026	Minh Tan Nguyen	Vietnam	Hanoi University of Science and Technology
2026	Padubidri V. Shivaprasad	India	National Centre for Biological Sciences
2026	Prakash P. Kumar	Singapore	National University of Singapore
2026	Ravigadevi Sambanthamurthi	Malaysia	Malaysian Palm Oil Board
2026	Romulo G. Davide	Philippines	University of the Philippines Los Baños
2026	Ambarish Ghosh	India	Indian Institute of Science
2026	Chwee Teck Lim	Singapore	National University of Singapore
2026	Diah Anggraini Wulandari	Indonesia	National Research and Innovation Agency (BRIN)
2026	Huji Xu	China	Tsinghua University
2026	Jongkyeong Chung	South Korea	Seoul National University
2026	Ju-young Shin	South Korea	Sungkyunkwan University
2026	Lisa Ng	Singapore	A*STAR Infectious Diseases Labs and A*STAR Biomedical Research Council
2026	Mi-hee Lim	South Korea	Korea Advanced Institute of Science and Technology
2026	Munkhsoyol Erkhembaatar	Mongolia	Mongolian National University of Medical Sciences
2026	Myadagbadam Urtnasan	Mongolia	Institute of Traditional Medicine and Technology
2026	Om Murti Anil	Nepal	National Cardiac Centre
2026	Rohit Srivastava	India	Indian Institute of Technology Bombay
2026	Rungsun Rerknimitr	Thailand	Chulalongkorn University
2026	Seiji Ogawa	Japan	Tohoku Fukushi University and Center for Information and Neural Networks
2026	Shimon Sakaguchi	Japan	University of Osaka
2026	Siew Chien Ng	Hong Kong	The Chinese University of Hong Kong
2026	Tien Yin Wong	China	Tsinghua University
2026	Tran Xuan Bach	Vietnam	Vietnam National University
2026	Yongjun Wang	China	Beijing Tiantan Hospital
2026	Anu Gopinath	India	Kerala University of Fisheries and Ocean Studies
2026	Kumi Yoshida	Japan	Nagoya University
2026	Susumu Kitagawa	Japan	Kyoto University
2026	Tao Zhang	China	Chinese Academy of Sciences
2026	Yadong Li	China	Tsinghua University
2026	Hyunjoo Lee	South Korea	Korea Institute of Science and Technology
2026	Jinliang He	China	Tsinghua University
2026	Kyung-in Jang	South Korea	Daegu Gyeongbuk Institute of Science and Technology
2026	Mohammad Abbas Uddin Shiyak	Bangladesh	Bangladesh University of Textiles
2026	Seung-Woo Kim	South Korea	Korea Advanced Institute of Science & Technology
2026	Shun-ichi Amari	Japan	Teikyo University
2026	Suman Chakraborty	India	Indian Institute of Technology Kharagpur
2026	Yoshihiko Nakamura	Japan	Kinescopic Inc
2026	Batmagnai Erdenechimeg	Mongolia	Mongolian Academy of Sciences
2026	Bipeen Dahal	Nepal	Tribhuvan University
2026	Harkunti Pertiwi Rahayu	Indonesia	Sumatera Institute of Technology
2026	Kusumita Arora	India	Indo-German Science & Technology Centre
2026	Madhav Gadgil	India	Ecologist
2026	Mary Donnabelle L. Balela	Philippines	University of the Philippines Diliman
2026	Meththika Suharshini Vithanage	Sri Lanka	University of Sri Jayewardenepura
2026	Mrutyunjay Mohapatra	India	India Meteorological Department
2026	Prasanti Widyasih Sarli	Indonesia	Institut Teknologi Bandung
2026	Supriya Sahu	India	Indian Administrative Service
2026	Truong Hai Bang	Vietnam	Van Lang University
2026	Yen-Ting Hwang	Taiwan	National Taiwan University
2026	Zubair Khalid	Pakistan	Lahore University of Management Sciences
2026	Daphne Teck Ching Lai	Brunei	Universiti Brunei Darussalam
2026	Kae Nemoto	Japan	Okinawa Institute of Science and Technology
2026	Wan-Jiun Liao	Taiwan	National Taiwan University
2026	Aileen Shau Hwai Tan	Malaysia	Universiti Sains Malaysia
2026	Anchalee Tassanakajon	Thailand	Chulalongkorn University
2026	Garry A. Benico	Philippines	Central Luzon State University
2026	Hongkui Deng	China	Peking University
2026	Shigeru Kuratani	Japan	RIKEN Center for Biosystems Dynamics Research
2026	Siyan Yi	Singapore	Saw Swee Hock School of Public Health, National University of Singapore
2026	Tahmeed Ahmed	Bangladesh	ICDDR,B
2026	Yvonne Ai-Lian Lim	Malaysia	University of Malaya
2026	Aparna Hegde	India	ARMMAN
2026	Aparna Taneja	India	Google Research
2026	Batmunkh Luvsandash	Mongolia	Environmentalist
2026	Eng Chye Tan	Singapore	National University of Singapore
2026	Jomo Kwame Sundaram	Malaysia	Khazanah Research Institute
2026	Michelle Xia	China	Akeso Biopharma
2026	Sarmila Tandukar	Nepal	Organization of Public Health and Environment Management
2026	Shaahina Ali	Maldives	Parley Maldives
2026	Dang Thi My Dung	Vietnam	Vietnam National University
2026	Grandprix Thomryes Marth Kadja	Indonesia	Institut Teknologi Bandung
2026	Nguyen Dinh Duc	Vietnam	Vietnam National University
2026	Thusitha Etampawala	Sri Lanka	University of Sri Jayewardenepura
2026	Xiaodong Chen	Singapore	Nanyang Technological University
2026	Yeng Ming Lam	Singapore	Nanyang Technological University
2026	Aurelio A. de los Reyes V	Philippines	University of the Philippines Diliman
2026	Masaki Kashiwara	Japan	Kyoto University
2026	May Anne E. Mata	Philippines	University of the Philippines Mindanao
2026	Xiaoyun Wang	China	Tsinghua University
2026	Hsiang-Yi Yang	Taiwan	National Tsing Hua University
2026	Pisin Chen	Taiwan	National Taiwan University
2026	Titas Chanda	India	Indian Institute of Technology Madras
2026	Sthitadhi Roy	India	Tata Institute of Fundamental Research
2026	Xi Dai	Hong Kong	Hong Kong University of Science and Technology
2026	Yukako Fujishiro	Japan	RIKEN Center for Emergent Matter Science & Pioneering Research Institute
2026	Miho Katsuragawa	Japan	Kyoto University
2026	Anusha Fatima	Pakistan	TrashIt
2026	Balasubramanian Gopal	India	Indian Institute of Science
2026	Farina Othman	Malaysia	Seratu Aatai
2026	Himawan Tri Bayu Murti Petrus	Indonesia	Universitas Gadjah Mada
2026	Rahayu Oktaviani	Indonesia	KIARA (Konservasi Ekosistem Alam Nusantara)
2026	Reshu Bashyal	Nepal	Greenhood Nepal
2026	Tista Prasai Joshi	Nepal	Nepal Academy of Science and Technology
