= Sun Sumei =

Sun Sumei may refer to:

- Sun Sumei (engineer), Singaporean engineer
- Sun Sumei (athlete) (born 1968), Chinese Olympic sprinter
