= Toriumi =

Toriumi is a Japanese surname. Notable people with the surname include:

- Akira Toriumi, Japanese engineer
- Hisayuki Toriumi (1941–2009), Japanese filmmaker
- Jinzō Toriumi (1929–2008), Japanese screenwriter
- Katsumi Toriumi, Japanese voice actor
- Kohsuke Toriumi, Japanese voice actor

== Fictional characters ==
- Isako Toriumi, a supporting character and Social Link in Persona 3
