= Dhiraj Kumar =

Dhiraj Kumar may refer to:

- Dhiraj Kumar (scientist)
- Dhiraj Kumar Nath, Bangladeshi diplomat
