= Shankar Ghosh =

Shankar Ghosh may refer to:

- Shankar Ghosh (musician)
- Shankar Ghosh (physicist)
- Shankar Ghosh (politician)

== See also ==
- Sankar Ghosh, Indian-American immunologist, microbiologist, and biochemist
