= Huijun Gao =

Huijun Gao from the Harbin Institute of Technology, Harbin, China was named Fellow of the Institute of Electrical and Electronics Engineers (IEEE) in 2014 for contributions to the theory and industrial applications of networked control systems.

Huijun Gao received the Ph.D. degree in control science and engineering from Harbin Institute of Technology, China, in 2005. From 2005 to 2007, he carried out his postdoctoral research with the Department of Electrical and Computer Engineering, University of Alberta, Canada. Since November 2004, he has been with Harbin Institute of Technology, where he is currently a Professor and director of the Research Institute of Intelligent Control and Systems.

Dr. Gao's research interests include network-based control, robust control, intelligent control and mechatronics. In these areas, he has (co-)authored 3 monographs, and published more 200 papers in international journals. He is a Co-Editor-in-Chief for the IEEE Transactions on Industrial Electronics, and an Associate Editor for Automatica, IEEE Transactions on Cybernetics, IEEE Transactions on Industrial Informatics, IEEE/ASME Transactions on Mechatronics, IEEE Transactions on Control Systems Technology. He is serving on the Administrative Committee of IEEE Industrial Electronics Society (IES).

Dr. Gao is a Fellow of IEEE. He was the recipient of the IEEE J. David Irwin Early Career Award from IEEE IES in 2013. In 2014, he was selected as one of the 17 world's most influential scientific minds by Thomson Reuters. In 2016, Gao became a laureate of the Asian Scientist 100 by the Asian Scientist.
