= S. Anantha Ramakrishna =

Indian physicist (born 1972)

Subramanian Anantha Ramakrishna (born 30 November 1972) is a professor of physics at the Indian Institute of Technology Kanpur specializing in optics and condensed matter physics. He was awarded the Shanti Swarup Bhatnagar Prize for Science and Technology, India's highest prize for excellence in science, mathematics and technology, in the physical sciences category in 2016.

== Education ==
Ramakrishna obtained his M.Sc. degree from the Indian Institute of Technology Kanpur in 1995 after pursuing the integrated 5-year M.Sc. programme and secured his Ph.D. from Raman Research Institute, Bangalore, in 2001. His thesis was titled "Light transport and localization in Active and passive random media" written under the supervision of Prof. N. Kumar.

== Career ==
He spent two years at the Imperial College, London, as a postdoctoral researcher and joined the Indian Institute of Technology Kanpur as an assistant professor in May 2003, where he now holds the position of professor. In July 2020, Prof. Ramakrishna took charge as Director of the CSIR-Central Scientific Instruments Organisation in Chandigarh on lien from IIT Kanpur and served there until October 2023.

== Distinctions and honors ==
- FNASc: Elected Fellow of the National Academy of Sciences India, 2022
- FIETE: Elected Fellow of the Institution of Electronics and Telecommunication Engineers, 2021
- Asian Scientist 100, Asian Scientist, 2017
- Shanti Swarup Bhatnagar Prize for Science and Technology, 2016
- Swarna Jayanti Fellowship 2012 by the Department of Science and Technology, India
- P. K. Kelkar Research Fellow at IIT Kanpur (2009–2012)
- Young Affiliate, The World Academy of Sciences (2007–2012)
- Young Scientist Medal, Indian National Science Academy, Delhi (2007)
- Young Scientist, Indian Academy of Sciences, Bangalore (2004–2007)
