= Xie Daoxin =

Chinese plant physiologist

- 谢道昕
- Born: January 1963 (age 63); Xinshao County, Hunan, China
- Education: Hunan Agricultural University; Chinese Academy of Agriculture Sciences
- Scientific career
- Fields: Plant physiology
- Workplaces: Tsinghua University

Chinese name
- Traditional Chinese: 謝道昕
- Simplified Chinese: 谢道昕
Transcriptions
Standard Mandarin
- Hanyu Pinyin: Xiè Dàoxīn

Xie Daoxin (Chinese: 谢道昕; born January 1963) is a Chinese plant physiologist and the current director of MOE Key Laboratory of Bioinformatics, Tsinghua University.

== Early life and education ==
Xie was born in Xinshao County, Hunan in January 1963. After the resumption of college entrance examination, he entered the Chinese Academy of Agricultural Sciences, where he graduated in 1983. He was a research assistant at Hunan Cotton Research Institute for a year. In 1984 he was accepted to the Chinese Academy of Agricultural Sciences, where he earned his Ph.D. in 1990.

== Career in the United Kingdom ==
From 1990 to 1994 he was a research associate at the John Innes Centre & Leicester University. He was a senior research associate at the University of East Anglia from 1994 to 1999.

== Career in Singapore ==
From 1999 to 2002 he was an adjunct assistant professor at the National University of Singapore and senior scientist, principal investigator and head of Plant Signal Transduction Laboratory. From 2002 to 2005 he was a senior scientist, principal investigator and head of Ubiquitin Signal Transduction Laboratory.

== Career in China ==
Xie returned to China in 2006 and that same year became professor at the School of Life Sciences, Tsinghua University.

== Honours and awards ==
- November 22, 2019 Member of the Chinese Academy of Sciences (CAS)
- 2023 Asian Scientist 100, Asian Scientist
