= Vikram Chandra Thakur =

Indian geologist

Vikram Chandra Thakur (born 1940) is a geologist whose work focuses on the regional geology, tectonics and earthquake geology of the Himalaya. Dr. Thakur is the former director of the Wadia Institute of Himalayan Geology, Dehradun, India. He is a Fellow of the Indian Academy of Sciences.

== Education ==
Born in Dharamsala in the Himalayan state of Himachal Pradesh in India, Dr. Thakur received his M.Sc. from Panjab University, Chandigarh and the University of Aberdeen. He went on to receive a Ph.D. DIC from Imperial College, London.

== Career and Research ==
He worked as a teacher from 1962 to 1965. In 1972, Vikram Chandra Thakur joined the Wadia Institute of Himalayan Geology and retired as its director. From 1972 to 1986, he was a senior scientist, and later served as its director for 13 years till year 2000. His specialization lies in the study of Himalayan geology, structural geology, and tectonics. In the course of his career, he extensively worked on the terrains of Zanskar, Ladakh, Garhwal, Chamba, Kumaon, and Arunachal Pradesh to establish their tectonic framework. He is a fellow of the Indian Academy of Sciences, and has written over 130 research papers.

== Awards and honors ==
He is a recipient of the National Mineral Award of the Government of India (1983 – 1984), and of the Padma Shri award in 2018. The following year, he became a laureate of the Asian Scientist 100 by the Asian Scientist.
