= Zhao Guochun =

Chinese geologist

- 赵国春
- Born: August 7, 1961 (age 65); Xiuyan Manchu Autonomous County, Liaoning, China
- Education: Jilin University; Curtin University
- Scientific career
- Fields: Geology
- Workplaces: University of Hong Kong

Chinese name
- Traditional Chinese: 趙國春
- Simplified Chinese: 赵国春
Transcriptions
Standard Mandarin
- Hanyu Pinyin: Zhào Guóchūn

Zhao Guochun (Chinese: 赵国春; born 7 August 1961) is a Chinese geologist and professor at the University of Hong Kong and Northwest University (China).

== Education ==
Zhao was born in Xiuyan Manchu Autonomous County, Liaoning on August 7, 1961. He secondary studied at the High School of Xiuyan Manchu Autonomous County. In 1981 he studied, then taught, at what is now Jilin University. In 2000 he obtained his doctor's degree from Curtin University. From August 2000 to July 2002 he was a postdoctoral fellow at the University of Hong Kong.

== Career ==
He taught at the University of Hong Kong since 2002, what he was promoted to associate professor in July 2007 and to full professor in July 2013.

== Honours and awards ==
- 2014 Fellow of the American Gem Society
- 2014 State Natural Science Award (Second Class)
- 2017 and 2019 Asian Scientist 100, Asian Scientist
- November 22, 2019 Member of the Chinese Academy of Sciences (CAS)
