= Mohammad Javed Ali =

Indian dacryologist

Mohammad Javed Ali is a medical scientist at Govindram Seksaria Institute of Dacryology, L. V. Prasad Eye Institute, Hyderabad, specialising in dacryology, the science of tear ducts. He is also Hong-Leong Professor at University of Singapore and Professor at Friedrich-Alexander University, Nuremberg, Germany. He obtained MS degree in ophthalmology in 2007 from NTR University of Health Sciences and PhD degree from University of Hyderabad.

== Honours and awards ==
Mohammed Javed Ali was awarded the Shanti Swarup Bhatnagar Prize for Science and Technology in Medical Sciences in the year 2020 for his contributions in the field of dacryology. The other many honours and awards received by him include:

- Asian Scientist 100, Asian Scientist (2020)
- Lester T Jones Award, American Society of Ophthalmic Plastics and Reconstructive Society (2020)
- Experienced Alexander Von Humboldt Research Fellowship Award, Alexander von Humboldt Foundation (2016)
- Merrill-Reeh Award, American Society of Ophthalmic Plastics and Reconstructive Surgery (2015)
- Fellow, Royal College of General Practitioners (FRCGP) (2003)
- Fellow, Royal College of Physicians and Surgeons of Glasgow (2008)
