= Zubair Hasan =

Indian economist (1932–2025)

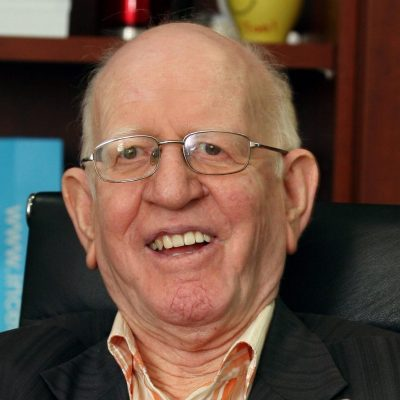
- Born: 1932
- Died: 2025 (aged 92–93)
- Education: Meerut College
- Scientific career
- Fields: Islamic finance
- Workplaces: INCEIF
- Website: www.zubairhasan.in

Zubair Hasan (1932 – 2025) was an Indian economist specialising in Islamic Economics.

Hasan did his undergraduate and PhD at Meerut College in Uttar Pradesh in (1973). He started his teaching career at Meerut College (1957) and retired as Professor Emeritus from INCEIF, The Global University of Islamic Finance Kuala Lumpur, Malaysia (2015).

Hasan was recipient of the IsDB Prize (Islamic Economics) 2009 the OIC COMCEC AWARD 2014 for contribution to Islamic economics and Finance. In addition he was associated with the Maulana Abul Kalam Urdu University, Hyderabad, India, a central government institution of the country as a visiting Professor of Islamic Finance. He served as Head of Department at Post-graduate Vardhaman College Bijnor (Agra University), Reader-Head at Zakir Hussain Delhi College. He also served as chairman of the Economics Department at the IIUM, Malaysia. Zubair was sent in 1981 on deputation by Government of India to BasraUniversity/Technical Institute, Amarah, Iraq.

On retirement, He donated his collection of materials to the INCEIF Library as a distinct collection, the Zubair Hasan Library. Until his passing he continued his association as Professor Emeritus of Economics and Finance with INCEIF.

Hasan was the son of the Maulvi Mohammad Majeed Hasan, who established the Madina newspaper (1912-1975).

Hasan died on 2025, at the age of 92–93.

== Selected works ==
=== Articles ===
- Hasan Zubair (2022): "Population growth dynamics: On fallacious comparisons", International Journal of Humanities and Social Science Research Volume 8, Issue 4, p. 129-130
- Hasan, Zubair (2021): Islamic Economics: Morality, Rationality, and Research, JKAU: Islamic Economics, Vol. 34, No. 2 (1 July): pp. 3–13. Jeddah
- Hasan, Zubair (2018): Academic sociology: Alarming rise in predatory publishing and its consequences for Islamic economics and finance, ISRA: International Journal of Islamic Finance Volume 10, Issue, 1, June pp. 8–21.
- Hasan, Zubair (2016) Risk-sharing: the sole basis of Islamic finance? Time for a serious rethink, JKAU Islamic Economics, Jeddah
- Hasan, Zubair (2008): ‘Ensuring Exchange Rate Stability: Is Return to Gold (Dinar) Possible? JKAU: Islamic Economics’ Vol. 21, No. 1 pp3–22

=== Book chapters ===
- Hasan, Zubair. "Sustainable development from an Islamic perspective: Meaning, implications, and policy concerns." Journal of King Abdulaziz University: Islamic Economics 19, no. 1 (2006).
- Hasan, Zubair. "Islamic banking at the crossroads: theory versus practice." (2005): 11-25.
- Hasan, Zubair. "Measuring efficiency of Islamic banks: criteria, methods, and social priorities." (2004): 1-30.
- Hasan, Zubair. "Islamization of knowledge in economics: Issues and agenda." (1998): 1-40.
- Hasan, Z. (2020): ‘Methodology of Islamic Economics – Is the subject worth discussing; in Methodology of Islamic Economics:Problems and solutions, edited by NecmettinKizlkaya: Rutledge UK
- Hasan, Z. (2020): Sustainable growth and finance from Islamic perspective in Islamic perspective for sustainable financial system, Mehmet SARAÇ (editor), Istanbul University Press, Turkey·
- Hasan, Z ..(2004): Determinants of FDI Flows to Developing Countries: Case of Malaysia” in‘ Foreign Direct Investment in Developing Countries’ edited by H.S. Kehal, Palgrave-Macmillan, UK.
- Hasan, Z. (1992): ‘Profit Maximization: Secular Versus Islamic’ in SayyidTahir et al (Ed) ‘Readings in Microeconomics: An Islamic Perspective’ Longman, Malaysia 1992 (Chapter 20, PP.239–255).

== Books ==
- Theory of profit(1975) Vikas, New Delhi (PhD Thesis).
- Foreign Direct Investment flows to Developing countries: Evidence from Malaysia, IIUM, Press 2003, KL
- Microeconomics from Islamic perspective (2006) Pearson, Kuala Lumpur
- Macroeconomics (2009) Oxford University Press, Kuala Lumpur
- Fundamentals of Microeconomics (2011), Oxford University Press, Kuala Lumpur
- Islamic Banking and Finance: An integrative approach (2014) Oxford University Press, Kuala Lumpur
- ECONOMICS with Islamic orientation (2016) Oxford University Press, KualaLumpur
- Theory of profit with Islamic directions (2018) Paragon, USA
- Economic Development from Islamic perspective (2019) LAP, Germany
- Leading issues in Islamic economics & finance: critical evaluations (2020) Palgrave-Macmillan UK.
- Controversial topics in Islamic economics and finance – A reconciliatory approach: Institute of Islamic Economics, 2021, KAU, Sau
- Essays in Islamic Economics and Finance, 2022 AniNik Books, New Delhi
- Islamic Banking and Finance (Second Edition), 2023 Rutledge, UK
- Edited the Urdu Bi-weekly Medina, Bijnor, UP under a pen name ز- ح for two years 1966-1968 when the editor went on leave.
- Translated into Urdu Gottfried von Haberler: Theory of International Trade (1939) under assignment from the Ministry of Education, Govt. of India

== Awards ==
- IIUM (International Islamic University Of Malaysia) AWARD - 2003 for excellent researcher in economics.
- IsDB(Islamic Development Bank) PRIZE - 2009 for great contribution to Islamic economics and research.
- OIC Comcec AWARD – 2014 for outstanding contribution to Islamic economics and Finance
- INCEIF( International Centre for Education in Islamic Finance) Professor Emeritus AWARD – 2015 for contribution to Islamic Economics & Finance at the University and worldwide.
- Asian Scientist 100, Asian Scientist - 2022
