= Suryendu Dutta =

Suryendu Dutta is a professor in the Department of Earth Sciences at IIT Bombay. His research interests include plant biomarkers in sediments and crude oils, plant metabolites, shale gas, molecular taphonomy, protein diagenesis, hydrocarbon source rock characterization and lignin metabolism. Dutta secured his M Sc degree in applied geology in 2001 from Jadavpur University, Kolkata, M Tech degree in geoexploration in 2003 from IIT Bombay and PhD degree in 2006 from RWTH Aachen University, Germany.

== Honours and awards ==
The honours and awards conferred on Dutta include:

- Shanti Swarup Bhatnagar Prize for Science and Technology in 2020 in Earth, Atmosphere, Ocean and Planetary Sciences for his contributions to the understanding of evolution of plantterpenoids
- SwarnaJayanti Fellowship Award, 2017
- National Geoscience Award, 2017
- Prof S P Sukhatme Excellence in Teaching Award, 2017
- NASI-SCOPUS Young Scientist Award, 2014
- INSA-DFG Exchange Fellowship, 2013
- Asian Scientist 100, Asian Scientist, 2021
