= Anish Ghosh =

Indian mathematician

Anish Ghosh is an Indian mathematician specializing in ergodic theory, Lie groups and number theory. He is a professor in the School of Mathematics of the Tata Institute of Fundamental Research (TIFR), Mumbai, and dean of the school. He was awarded the Shanti Swarup Bhatnagar Prize for Science and Technology in mathematical sciences in 2021. He is also a member of the INFOSYS-Chandrasekharan Virtual Centre for Random Geometry, a group of scientists at TIFR Mumbai and ICTS Bengaluru working on random geometry.

Ghosh was born on 25 December 1979. He earned a BSc from St. Xavier’s College, Mumbai, in 2001 and a PhD from Brandeis University in Waltham, Massachusetts, in 2006. His research supervisor was Dmitry Yanovich Kleinbock. After a period as a postdoctoral fellow at the University of Texas at Austin, he joined the University of East Anglia in the United Kingdom as a lecturer. A few years later, he joined the faculty at TIFR.

== Recognitions ==
In addition to the Shanti Swarup Bhatnagar Prize for Science and Technology, Ghosh has received the following honours:

- NASI-Scopus Young Scientist Award in 2017
- DST Swarnajayanti Fellowship in 2017
- Fellow of the Indian Academy of Sciences in 2018
- B M Birla Science Prize in 2017
- Asian Scientist 100, Asian Scientist, 2022
- Fellow of the Indian National Science Academy, 2025
- J. C. Bose grant of the ANRF
