= Ming Joo Koh =

- Born: Singapore
- Occupations: Academic, organic chemist
- Known for: Sustainable catalysis in organic and organometallic chemistry
- Title: Dean's Chair Professor and Deputy Head (Research), Department of Chemistry, NUS
- Awards: President's Science and Technology Awards (2022)

Academic background
- Education: Nanyang Technological University (BSc); Boston College (PhD)
- Doctoral advisor: Amir H. Hoveyda

Academic work
- Discipline: Chemistry
- Sub-discipline: Organic chemistry, organometallic chemistry
- Institutions: National University of Singapore
- Main interests: Sustainable catalysis, stereoselective synthesis
- Website: mjkohgroup.com

Ming Joo Koh is a Singaporean academic and organic chemist who is the Dean's Chair Professor and Deputy Head of Research in the Department of Chemistry at the National University of Singapore.

== Early life and education ==
Ming Joo Koh was born and raised in Singapore. He earned a Bachelor of Science with first-class honours in chemistry and biological chemistry from Nanyang Technological University (NTU) in 2012, where he conducted research under Philip Chan on gold‐catalyzed cycloisomerization reactions for heterocycle formation.

After completing his undergraduate degree, Koh pursued doctoral studies in organic chemistry at Boston College under Amir H. Hoveyda. During his Ph.D., he collaborated with Richard R. Schrock at MIT on developing stereoselective olefin metathesis catalysts, focusing on methods to control alkene stereochemistry in natural products and pharmaceutical synthesis. He continued as a post-doctoral fellow in the same laboratory, shifting his research to catalytic stereoselective transformations of organofluorine compounds.

== Career ==
Koh returned to Singapore in June 2018 to join the Department of Chemistry at the National University of Singapore (NUS) as a President's assistant professor. During his early tenure at NUS, he developed a research program in sustainable catalysis and organic synthesis. He was promoted to tenured associate professor in 2023, and in 2024 he assumed the role of Deputy Head (Research) of the Chemistry Department and was appointed as a Dean's Chair Professor for 2024–2027.

Koh also serves as an Adjunct Senior Principal Investigator at A*STAR's Institute of Sustainability for Chemicals, Energy and Environment (ISCE²) from 2024 and is a principal investigator with the Cambridge Centre for Advanced Research and Education in Singapore (CARES) in a sustainable chemistry programme.

== Research ==
Koh's research centers on sustainable catalysis in organic and organometallic chemistry. He develops catalytic methods using abundant base metals such as iron, nickel, and copper in place of precious metals to reduce environmental impact and lower costs. His work includes creating catalyst systems that perform multi-step reactions in one operation, for example, nickel-catalyzed tandem Heck coupling with alkene isomerization to produce stereochemically defined olefins. He has also developed a metal-free photochemical method for glycosylation using visible light and an iron-catalyzed remote protoboration technique for selective boron installation on alkenes.

== Selected publications ==
- Koh, Ming Joo; Nguyen, Thach T.; Zhang, Hanmo; Schrock, Richard R.; Hoveyda, Amir H. (March 2, 2016). "Direct synthesis of Z-alkenyl halides through catalytic cross-metathesis". Nature. 531 (7595): 459–465. doi:10.1038/nature17396. hdl:1721.1/108033. PMC 4858352 – via www.nature.com.
- Yu, X.; Zhao, H.; Xi, S.; Chen, Z.; Wang, X.; Wang, L.; Lin, L. Q. H.; Loh, K. P.; Koh, M. J. (2020). "Site-selective alkene borylation enabled by synergistic hydrometallation and borometallation". Nature Catalysis. 3: 585–592.
- Liu, Chen-Fei; Wang, Hongyu; Martin, Robert T.; Zhao, Haonan; Gutierrez, Osvaldo; Koh, Ming Joo (August 2, 2021). "Olefin functionalization/isomerization enables stereoselective alkene synthesis". Nature Catalysis. 4 (8): 674–683. doi:10.1038/s41929-021-00658-2. PMC 9431960 – via www.nature.com.
- Liu, Chen-Fei; Wang, Zi-Chao; Luo, Xiaohua; Lu, Jiawei; Ko, Charyl Hui Min; Shi, Shi-Liang; Koh, Ming Joo (October 2, 2022). "Synthesis of tri- and tetrasubstituted stereocentres by nickel-catalysed enantioselective olefin cross-couplings". Nature Catalysis. 5 (10): 934–942. doi:10.1038/s41929-022-00854-8 – via www.nature.com.
- Wang, Quanquan; Lee, Boon Chong; Tan, Ting Jun; Jiang, Yi; Ser, Wei Han; Koh, Ming Joo (December 2, 2022). "Visible light activation enables desulfonylative cross-coupling of glycosyl sulfones". Nature Synthesis. 1 (12): 967–974. doi:10.1038/s44160-022-00162-w – via www.nature.com.
- Jiang, Yi; Wei, Yi; Zhou, Qian-Yi; Sun, Guo-Quan; Fu, Xia-Ping; Levin, Nikita; Zhang, Yijun; Liu, Wen-Qiang; Song, NingXi; Mohammed, Shabaz; Davis, Benjamin G.; Koh, Ming Joo (July 2, 2024). "Direct radical functionalization of native sugars". Nature. 631 (8020): 319–327. doi:10.1038/s41586-024-07548-0. PMC 11236704 – via www.nature.com.

== Awards and recognition ==
- 2021: MIT Technology Review Innovators Under 35 Asia Pacific Award
- 2021: TCI-SNIC Industry Award in Synthetic Chemistry
- 2022: Thieme Chemistry Journals Award
- 2022: C&EN Talented 12
- 2022: President's Science and Technology Awards
- 2023: Asian Scientist 100
- 2023: Novartis Early Career Award in Chemistry
- 2023: NUS Researcher Award
- 2024: Mitsui Chemicals Catalysis Science Award
