= Kanishka Biswas =

Indian researcher

Kanishka Biswas is a professor in the New Chemistry Unit at Jawaharlal Nehru Centre for Advanced Scientific Research, Bangalore with research interests focused on renewable energy and clean environment. The areas in which he has worked include solid state inorganic chemistry of metal chalcogenides, thermoelectric materials, 2D layered materials, topological insulators.

== Early life and education ==
Kanishk Biswas was born on 25 October 1982. Biswas obtained his MS degree in chemical science from Indian Institute of Science, Bangalore in 2006 and PhD degree from the same institute in 2009 both under the supervision of C. N. R. Rao. He had spent three years (June 2006 - May 2009) as Postdoctoral Fellow under the supervision of Mercouri Kanatzidis at Northwestern University, Evanston, IL, USA

== Honours and awards ==
The honours and awards conferred on Kanishka Biswas include:

- Shanti Swarup Bhatnagar Prize for Science and Technology for Chemical Sciences, 2021
- National Prize for Research in Inorganic and Physical Chemistry – CNR Rao Education Foundation, (2021)
- ICSC Materials Science Annual Prize, Materials Research Society, India (MRSI) (2020)
- Swarnajayanti Fellowship, Department of Science & Technology (DST) (2019)
- Chemical Research Society of India (CRSI) Bronze Medal (2019).
- Young Scientists Medal, Indian National Science Academy (INSA), New Delhi (2016).
- Associate of Indian Academy of Sciences (IASc), Bangalore (2014-2017).
- Ramanujan Fellowship, Department of Science & Technology (DST) (2012-2017).
- Asian Scientist 100, Asian Scientist, 2022
