= Li Jingmei =

Li Jingmei is a research scientist with a primary focal point on breast cancer research at the Genome Institute of Singapore (GIS) in the Laboratory of Women's Health and Genetics. Li’s research focuses on understanding the causes of cancer and preventing or early detection of cancer. Her personal mission is to improve the lives of women. Li is passionate about science communication, education, and promoting breast cancer awareness.

== Education ==
Li received her bachelor's degree in Life Sciences with a minor in Technopreneurship at the National University of Singapore and was part of the University Scholars Programme (USP). She graduated in 2006 and was named valedictorian of the Faculty of Science. Li extended her undergraduate studies for one year to participate in the NUS Overseas College (NOC) programme in Silicon Valley, USA. She completed her Ph.D. studies at the Karolinska Institute in Sweden.

== Works and research ==
Li was inspired by her Ph.D. Supervisor, Professor Per Hall to research into breast cancer. She was convinced that as a clinician she could only help her patients only but as a researcher, she could help many more people.

Li works as a group leader and Senior Research Scientist in the Laboratory of Women’s Health & Genetics at the GIS. She focuses on examining the DNA to look for genetic differences that define who is most likely to develop or die from cancer and the non-genetic factors.

Li mentioned in an interview with Augustin Chiam, a political science and USP student at NUS, that cancer research within Sweden is easier than within Singapore. This is due to the fact that Sweden has a nation-wide centralized database of patient’s records that span back a few generations while on the other hand, the patient data within Singapore is owned by private hospitals thus not easily accessible.

Li wants to also focus on how ethnicity plays a factor due to the fact that most research on breast cancer has been done on mainly European participants and where only 14% of genetic breast cancer studies have involved Asians.

Li engaged and spoke about cancer in three TED talks (TEDxSIT, TEDxNTU, and TEDxISKL).

== Awards and honors ==
- In 2014, Li was awarded the UNESCO-L’Oréal International for Women in Science Fellowship that gave her a US$40,000 grant to encourage greater gender parity in the sciences.
- In 2017, Li received the Young Scientist Award administered by the Singapore National Academy of Science.
- In 2018, she was inducted as a class of 2018 National Research Foundation Fellow.
- In 2018, she became a laureate of the Asian Scientist 100 by the Asian Scientist.
