= Benjamin Tee =

Singaporean electrical engineer

- Born: Tee Chee Keong Benjamin; 1981 or 1982 (age 44–45); Singapore
- Education: Stanford University; University of Michigan-Ann Arbor
- Known for: Electronic skins
- Awards: MIT TR35
- Scientific career
- Fields: Electronic sensor skins research
- Workplaces: National University of Singapore (NUS); Institute of Materials Research and Engineering (IMRE), Agency for Science, Technology and Research (A*Star)

Tee Chee Keong Benjamin is a Singaporean scientist. He helped to co-develop the electronic skin technology when he was a PhD student in Stanford University. In 2015, he was chosen as one of TR35 list (MIT Technology Review's global 35 Innovators Under 35) for his work on e-skin. The only Singaporean on the 2015 TR35 list, e-skins could potentially make prosthetic limbs as sensitive as human ones and enable intuitive human machine interactions. In 2019, he co-developed an underwater self-healing transparent material that could be useful in marine environments.

== Career ==
Tee is currently Full Professor (tenured) at the National University of Singapore's Department of Material Science and Engineering.

He is currently Vice-President ( Ecosystem Building) developing the Innovation and Enterprise ecosystem.

He served as Vice-Dean of Research and Technology at the College of Design and Engineering and Associate Vice-President at NUS Enterprise.

He was the President's assistant professor between 2017 and 2021 and promotoed to Associate Professor (2022-2025).

Prior to joining NUS, he was a Scientist at the Institute for Materials Research and Engineering (IMRE) (2015-2017).

== Education ==
- BS (Summa cum laude) Electrical Engineering, University of Michigan-Ann Arbor, 2006
- MS Electrical Engineering, Stanford University, 2007
- PhD Electrical Engineering, Stanford University, 2014

== Awards ==
- 2005 Undergraduate Outstanding Research Award
- 2010 TSMC Outstanding Student Research Gold Award
- 2010 TSMC Outstanding Student Research Academy
- 2013 MRS Graduate Student Gold Award
- 2014 Singapore-Stanford Biodesign Global Innovation Fellow
- 2015 One of 10 finalists TR35 APAC list
- 2015 One of 35 Innovators Under 35 TR35 list by MIT Technology Review
- 2016 Asian Scientist 100, Asian Scientist
- 2016 Singapore Young Scientist Award
- 2019 World Economic Forum Young Scientist

== Selected publications ==
1. A transparent, self-healing and high-κ dielectric for low-field-emission stretchable optoelectronics, YJ Tan, H. Godaba, G. Chen, STM Tan, GX Wan, G. Li, PM Lee, Y. Cai, S. Li, R. F. Shepherd, J. S Ho, B. C-K. Tee*, Nature Materials, (2020).
2. A neuro-inspired artificial peripheral nervous system for scalable electronic skins, WW Lee, YJ Tan, H Yao, S Li, HH See, M Hon, B Xiong, K Ng, J Ho, B. C-K. Tee*, Science Robotics, (2019). Featured as Cover.
3. Self-healing electronic skins for aquatic environments, Y Cao, YJ Tan, S Li, WW Lee, H Guo, Y Cai, C Wang, B. C-K. Tee*, Nature Electronics, 2, (2019). Featured as Cover.
4. A Skin-Inspired Organic Digital Mechanoreceptor, B. C-K. Tee*, A. Chortos*, A. Berndt*, et al., Science, 350, 313–316 (2015). Featured on Science Magazine
5. Continuous Wireless Pressure Monitoring and Mapping with Ultra-Small Passive Sensors for Health Monitoring and Critical Care, L. Chen*, B. C-K. Tee*, et al., Nature Communications, 5, 5028, (2014)
6. An electrically and mechanically self-healing composite with pressure- and flexion-sensitive properties for electronic skin applications, B. C-K. Tee*, C. Wang*, R. Allen, Z. Bao, Nature Nanotechnology, 7, 825–832 (2012) | Featured on Science Magazine, BBC, ABC, National Geography
7. Tunable Flexible Pressure Sensors using Microstructured Elastomer Geometries for Intuitive Electronics, B. C-K. Tee et al., Advanced Functional Materials 24, 5427–5434, (2014)
8. Highly sensitive flexible pressure sensors with micro-structured rubber dielectric layers, SCB Mannsfeld, B. C-K Tee, et al., Nature Materials 9, 859–864, (2010). Featured on Nature News and Views
