= Yukiko Ogawa =

Materials science researcher

- 小川 由希子 (Ogawa Yukiko)
- Born: Aichi Prefecture, Japan
- Education: Tohoku University
- Awards: The 28th Young Researcher Award, Japan Institute of Metals and Materials (JIM 2018); 2018 L'Oréal-UNESCO For Women in Science International Rising Talent.
- Scientific career
- Workplaces: The National Institute for Materials Science
- Thesis: Phase transformation and mechanical properties of Mg-Sc alloy (2017)
- Doctoral advisor: Jun'ichi Koike

Yukiko Ogawa (小川 由希子 (Ogawa Yukiko)) is a materials science researcher at the National Institute for Materials Science in Tsukuba, Ibaraki Prefecture, Japan. Ogawa's research focuses on next-generation structural materials — particularly lightweight ones such as magnesium alloys — that show promising potential to improve fuel efficiency in vehicles, make electronic devices more portable and open up new possibilities in medical devices. The use of magnesium alloys has been limited as they are difficult to shape into new forms. But Ogawa succeeded in controlling the microstructure and mechanical properties of magnesium by heat treatment, which had previously been considered impossible. Ogawa grew up in Komaki, Aichi Prefecture and studied engineering at Tohoku University in Sendai.

In her spare time, Ogawa enjoys reading novels, sewing, embroidery and painting. She also travels with her husband and family and visits hot springs.

== Awards ==
For her efforts in creating the next generation of smart materials, Ogawa was recognized in 2018 with both the L'Oréal-UNESCO For Women in Science International Rising Talent and the 28th Young Researcher Award, Japan Institute of Metals and Materials. The following year, she became a laureate of the Asian Scientist 100 by the Asian Scientist.

== Bibliography ==
- Ogawa, Yukiko (2019). "Development of High Performance Magnesium Alloy Through Phase Transformation". Materia Japan. 58 (7): 395–400. doi:10.2320/materia.58.395 ISSN 1340-2625.
- Ogawa, Yukiko; Sutou, Yuji; Ando, Daisuke; Koike, Junichi (2018-05-30). "Aging precipitation kinetics of Mg-Sc alloy with bcc+hcp two-phase". Journal of Alloys and Compounds. 747: 854–860. doi:10.1016/j.jallcom.2018.03.064 ISSN 0925-8388
- Ando, D.; Ogawa, Y.; Suzuki, T.; Sutou, Y.; Koike, J. (2015-12-15). "Age-hardening effect by phase transformation of high Sc containing Mg alloy". Materials Letters. 161: 5–8. doi:10.1016/j.matlet.2015.06.057 ISSN 0167-577X
