= Jianhua Zhang =

Chinese electrical engineer

Jianhua Zhang is a Chinese electrical engineer whose research focuses on signal propagation, communication channel modeling, and quality of service of 5G and 6G cellular networks and other forms of wireless communication. She is a professor at the Beijing University of Posts and Telecommunications.

== Education and career ==
Zhang was a student at the North China University of Technology, where she received her bachelor's degree in 1998. She continued her studies at the Beijing University of Posts and Telecommunications, and as a visiting student at the Hamburg University of Technology; she received a master's degree in 2000 from the Beijing University of Posts and Telecommunications and completed her Ph.D. in 2003.

== Recognition ==
In 2023, Zhang was a recipient of the 18th Chinese Young Women in Science Award, "for advancing research on signal processing, wireless Communication, radio channel Measurement and Modelling and channel simulation". She was listed in the 2024 Asian Scientist 100. She was named to the 2026 class of IEEE Fellows, "for contributions to channel measurement, modeling theory, and standards of mobile communications".
