= Makiko Sasada =

Japanese mathematician

Makiko Sasada (Japanese: 佐々田槙子) is a Japanese mathematician and mathematical physicist. Her research applies probability theory and statistical physics in understanding differential equations such as the Navier–Stokes equations for fluid flow as the scaling limits of particle systems. She is also known for her web site encouraging Japanese girls in mathematics. She is a professor in the Graduate School of Mathematical Sciences at the University of Tokyo.

== Education and career ==
Sasada was born in the United States, circa 1985, but returned with her family to Japan as an infant. Her mother worked as a translator and her father as a research physicist. She completed her Ph.D. in 2011 at the University of Tokyo, with support as a research fellow of the Japan Society for the Promotion of Science. Her doctoral work was jointly supervised by Stefano Olla and Tadahisa Funaki.

She became an assistant professor at Keio University from 2011 to 2014, continuing there in 2014–2015 as a lecturer (senior assistant professor). In 2015 she obtained an associate professor position at the University of Tokyo, where she was promoted to full professor in 2023. She added a second affiliation with the Riken Laboratory of Mathematics in 2017.

== Recognition ==
Sasada received the Takebe Katahiro Prize for Encouragement of Young Researchers of the Mathematical Society of Japan in 2010, the University of Tokyo President's prize in 2011, and the JSPS Ikushi Prize of the Japan Society for the Promotion of Science in 2011. She was the 2021 recipient of the Jun Ashida Brilliant Female Researchers Award of the Japan Science and Technology Agency. The National Institute of Science and Technology Policy (NISTEP) named her as an NISTEP Selection researcher in 2025.

Sasada was listed in the 2022 Asian Scientist 100. She is an invited speaker at the 2026 International Congress of Mathematicians.

== Personal life ==
Sasada married a banker in 2013. They have two children, the second one born in New York City during the COVID-19 lockdowns.
