= Vatsala Thirumalai =

Scientist

- Born: India
- Education: Anna University (B.Tech); Brandeis University (Ph.D.)
- Known for: Research on neural circuits and motor control in zebrafish
- Awards: Shanti Swarup Bhatnagar Prize (2020); Asian Scientist 100 (2021)
- Scientific career
- Fields: Neuroscience, Developmental Biology
- Workplaces: National Centre for Biological Sciences, TIFR

Vatsala Thirumalai is a scientist at Neural Circuits and Development Laboratory, National Centre for Biological Sciences, Tata Institute of Fundamental Research, Bengaluru. She secured B Tech degree in biotechnology from Anna University, Chennai and PhD degree in neuroscience from Brandeis University, Waltham, MA. She was a Post-Doctoral Fellow at Cold Spring Harbor Laboratory, Cold Spring Harbor, NY and the National Institutes of Health, Bethesda, MD.

== Research ==
The research at Neural Circuits and Development Laboratory which Vatsala Thirumali heads is focused on studying the working of the neural circuits that cause physical movements in animals. The lab has chosen the zebrafish, a fish endemic to the Ganges, for intensive study because of the transparent nature of their body during the embryonic and larval stages. This helps direct visual observation of the interiors.

== Awards ==
Vatsala Thirumalai was awarded the Shanti Swarup Bhatnagar Prize for Science and Technology in Biological Sciences in 2020 for her contributions towards understanding communication and modulation of neuronal function. The following year, Thirumalai became a laureate of the Asian Scientist 100 by the Asian Scientist.
