= Ritesh Agarwal (scientist) =

Ritesh Agarwal is an Indian medical doctor and professor in the Department of Pulmonary Medicine at PGIMER Chandigarh having research interests in allergic bronchopulmonary aspergillosis (ABPA). He was awarded the Shanti Swarup Bhatnagar Prize for Science and Technology in Medical Sciences in the year 2020 for his contributions in the field of ABPA.

Agarwal has published many research papers exploring the ABPA and novel criteria for the diagnosis and classification of ABPA.

== Education ==
Ritesh Agarwal secured his M.B.B.S. degree in 1998 from Stanley Medical College, Chennai, and completed his Fellowship in pulmonary and critical care medicine from PGIMER in 2004.

== Honours and recognitions ==
Besides the Shanti Swarup Bhatnagar Prize for Science and Technology, Rohit Srivastava has been conferred several awards including the following:

- ICMR Kamal Satbir Award, 2009
- NASI-Scopus Young Scientist Award (Medicine category), 2011
- ICMR Shakuntala Amir Chand Award, 2012
- ICMR Chaturvedi Ghanshyam Das Jaigopal Memorial Award, 2019
- Shanti Swarup Bhatnagar Prize for Science and Technology, 2020
- Asian Scientist 100, Asian Scientist, 2021
- Fellow of the American College of Chest Physicians
- Fellow of Asian Pacific Society of Respirology
- Fellow of Indian Chest Society
- Fellow of Royal College of Physicians of Glasgow.
