= Debdeep Mukhopadhyay =

Indian cryptographer

- Born: Howrah, India
- Education: Indian Institute of Technology Kharagpur
- Occupation: Professor
- Known for: Hardware Security
- Awards: 2015 – Swarnajayanti Fellowship; 2021 – Shanti Swarup Bhatnagar Award; 2021 – Khosla National Award; 2022 – Qualcomm India Faculty Award

Debdeep Mukhopadhyay is an Indian cryptographer and professor at the Department of Computer Science and Engineering of the Indian Institute of Technology Kharagpur. He is currently serving as the Associate Dean of Research & Development at IIT Kharagpur since August 2025. He was awarded the Shanti Swarup Bhatnagar Award for Science and Technology, the highest science award in India, in 2021 for his contributions to micro-architectural security and cryptographic engineering. Debdeep Mukhopadhyay’s research interests include Hardware security, Cryptographic Engineering, Design Automation of Cryptosystems, VLSI of Cryptosystems, and Cryptography. He has authored several textbooks, including Cryptography and Network Security, which has been cited 1,572 times, according to Google Scholar. He was elected Fellow of the Indian National Academy of Engineering (INAE) in 2021. In 2025, he was elected Fellow of the Indian National Science Academy (FNA), Fellow of the Indian Academy of Sciences (FASc), and was elevated to IEEE Fellow “for contributions to design and analysis of hardware security primitives.” He is also an invited Fellow of the Asia-Pacific Artificial Intelligence Association (AAIA) (2022). In 2025, he was named a Pingala Interactions in Computing (PIC) Laureate by ACM India.

== Early life, education and academic career ==
Debdeep Mukhopadhyay was born on 31 October 1977 in Howrah, West Bengal a twin town of Kolkata. He completed his B.Tech from the Indian Institute of Technology Kharagpur in 2001. He completed his M.S. and Ph.D. from the same institute in 2004 and 2007, respectively. His PhD thesis was awarded the Techno-Inventor Award (Best PhD Award) by the Indian Semiconductors Association in 2008. He served as an assistant professor at the Department of Computer Science and Engineering, Indian Institute of Technology Madras between 2007 and 2008. He joined the Department of Computer Science and Engineering, Indian Institute of Technology Kharagpur as an assistant professor in 2008 and is currently the Institute Chair Professor.

At IIT Kharagpur, he initiated the Secured Embedded Architecture Laboratory (SEAL), focusing on hardware security. Prior to that, he held visiting appointments as a visiting professor in the School of Computer Engineering at New York University Abu Dhabi (NYUAD); a visiting scientist at the Cyber Security Research Centre (CYSREN), School of Computer Science and Engineering, Nanyang Technological University, Singapore; a visiting associate professor in the Department of Computer Science at New York University Shanghai, China; and visiting faculty at the Polytechnic Institute of New York University, Brooklyn, United States.

== Awards and Recognitions ==
- 2025 Pingala Interactions in Computing (PIC) Laureate (ACM India)
- 2025 Fellow of IEEE for contributions to design and analysis of hardware security primitives
- 2025 Fellow of Indian National Academy of Sciences (FNA)
- 2025 Fellow of Indian Academy of Sciences (FASc)
- 2022 Institute Chair Professor, IIT Kharagpur
- 2022 Fellow C3iHub, IIT Kanpur
- 2022 Qualcomm India Faculty Award
- 2022 Invited Fellow of Asia-Pacific Artificial Intelligence Association (AAIA) for outstanding contributions to Information Security
- 2022 Asian Scientist 100, Asian Scientist
- 2021 Khosla National Award on Engineering from IIT Roorkee
- 2021 Shanti Swarup Bhatnagar Award for Science & Technology (Highest science award in India)
- 2021 Fellow of the Indian National Academy of Engineering (INAE)
- 2018 Data Security Council of India (DSCI) Excellence Award for Cyber Security Education
- 2015–16 Department of Science and Technology (India) Swarnajayanti Fellowship
- 2012 Recipient of Indo–U.S. Science and Technology Forum (IUSSTF) Fellowship
- 2012 Associate of the Indian Academy of Sciences
- 2011 Outstanding Young Faculty Fellowship (OYFF), IIT Kharagpur
- 2010 Indian National Academy of Engineering Young Engineer Award
- 2010 Indian National Science Academy Young Scientist Award
- 2008 Indian Semiconductor Association (ISA) Techno-Inventor Award (Best PhD Award)

== Books ==
- Cryptography and Network Security, McGraw Hill Education
- Hardware Security: Design, Threats, and Safeguards, Chapman and Hall/CRC
- Timing Channels in Cryptography - A Micro-Architectural Perspective, Springer
- Fault Tolerant Architectures for Cryptography and Hardware Security, Springer
