= Rajat Subhra Hazra =

Indian mathematician

Dr. Rajat Subhra Hazra
- Born: Kolkata, India
- Education: St. Xavier's College, Kolkata; University of Calcutta; Indian Statistical Institute
- Awards: Shanti Swarup Bhatnagar Prize (2020); Asian Scientist 100 (2021)
- Scientific career
- Fields: Mathematics
- Workplaces: Indian Statistical Institute

Dr. Rajat Subhra Hazra is an Indian mathematician specialising in probability theory. He was awarded the Shanti Swarup Bhatnagar Prize for Science and Technology, the highest science award in India, for the year 2020 in mathematical science category. He is affiliated to the Mathematical Institute of Leiden University, the Netherlands from 2021. Prior to that he was affiliated to Indian Statistical Institute, Kolkata. Dr. Hazra has a very broad range of research interests including extreme value theory, regular variation, random matrices, free probability, Gaussian free fields, branching random walks, membrane models, random graphs, etc.

He is well known for his out of the box analysis of day to day events. A recent example came into limelight when he asked an exam question with Covfefe, a word that featured in US President Donald Trump’s tweet for random sequence of letters.

He is an elected Fellow of Indian Academy of Sciences.

== Selected bibliography ==
=== Articles ===
- Chakrabarty, Arijit; Chakraborty, Sukrit; Hazra, Rajat Subhra (26 September 2020). "Eigenvalues Outside the Bulk of Inhomogeneous Erdős–Rényi Random Graphs". Journal of Statistical Physics. 181 (5): 1746–1780. Bibcode:2020JSP...181.1746C. doi:10.1007/s10955-020-02644-7. S2CID 224925701.
- Cipriani, Alessandra; Hazra, Rajat Subhra (February 2017). "Thick points for Gaussian free fields with different cut-offs". Annales de l'Institut Henri Poincaré, Probabilités et Statistiques. 53 (1): 79–97. arXiv:1407.5840. Bibcode:2017AnIHP..53...79C. doi:10.1214/15-AIHP709. S2CID 38426529.
- Bose, Arup; Hazra, Rajat Subhra; Saha, Koushik (June 2011). "Patterned Random Matrices and Method of Moments". Proceedings of the International Congress of Mathematicians 2010 (ICM 2010): 2203–2231. doi:10.1142/9789814324359_0142. ISBN 978-981-4324-30-4.
