= Sotheara Chhim =

Sotheara Chhim Doctor
- Born: 1968 (age 57–58); Phnom Penh
- Education: University of Health Sciences, Phnom Penh, University of New South Wales, Monash University
- Occupations: Psychiatrist, executive director
- Medical career
- Sub-specialties: Genocide survivor psychiatry
- Awards: Asian Scientist 100 (2023); Ramon Magsaysay Award (2022)

Sotheara Chhim is a Cambodian psychiatrist, known for working with victims and their families of the Cambodian genocide. He was awarded the 2022 Ramon Magsaysay Award for his work in helping the survivors of the genocide.

== Early life ==
Sotheara grew up during the Khmer Rouge era in the 1970s. His mother worked as a government official in the Ministry of Public Works and Transport, his father died when he was young. His family was evacuated from the capital by the Khmer Rouge and brought to work in the provinces in what was hoped to be a temporary measure (they would not return to the city until after the fall of the Khmer Rouge regime). He was separated from his family and then ordered to live in a cottage with other children, all of whom were conscripted to work digging a canal. He would not see his mother again until 1978. The family moved back to Phnom Penh after the city was liberated in 1979. Growing up, he wanted to be an architect, but was encouraged by his mother to go into the medical field. He was one of the first Cambodian psychiatrists to graduate (in 1992) from Phnom Penh's University of Health Sciences after the city was liberated. He completed his Masters degree in Psychological Medicine at the University of New South Wales in 2000. He earned his PhD at Monash University in Melbourne between 2008 and 2012.

== Career ==
Sotheara has worked with the Transcultural Psychosocial Organisation Cambodia NGO since around 2000; serving as the executive director since 2002. The organisation works with survivors of the genocide and their families, helping them overcome lingering trauma (treating around 10,000 individuals a year). Sotheara works on treating "baksbat" -- or "broken courage" -- "a syndrome seen in Cambodia that is similar to post-traumatic stress disorder". Sotheara has explained unique needs of these individuals requiring treatment. As psychiatric care was only introduced in Cambodia in the 1990s, many individuals do not understand psychiatry, seeing it as a sort of "black magic" and mental health issues are thought to be due to being possessed by evil spirits. Sotheara's organisation works within these beliefs to deliver treatment to individuals, helping them overcome the lingering trauma after years of war, genocide and social change.

He has also testified as an expert witness before a United Nations-backed tribunal trying senior Khmer Rouge leaders.

He was awarded the Ramon Magsaysay Award in 2022 The Magsaysay Award organisers cited "his calm courage in surmounting deep trauma to become his people's healer" as a reason for awarding him the prize. He has also received the 2012 International Law and Justice's Human Rights Award from the Leitner Center at Fordham University School of Law in the USA. In 2017 he was awarded the 2017 Dr Guislain 'Breaking the Chains of Stigma' Award in Ghent, Belgium on World Health Day for Mental Health.
