= Kim-Chuan Toh =

Singaporean mathematician

Kim-Chuan Toh is a Singaporean mathematician, and Leo Tan Professor in Science at the National University of Singapore (NUS). He is known for his contributions to the theory, practice, and application of convex optimization, especially semidefinite programming and conic programming.

== Education ==
Toh received BSc (Hon.) in 1990 and MSc in 1992, from NUS, and PhD in 1996 from Cornell University.

== Awards and honours ==
Toh received the 2017 INFORMS Optimization Society Farkas Prize, and 2019 President's Science Award (Singapore). He is a fellow of the Society of Industrial and Applied Mathematics (Class of 2018). In 2020, Toh became a laureate of the Asian Scientist 100 by the Asian Scientist.

== Selected works ==
- Toh, K. C.; Todd, M. J.; Tütüncü, R. H., "SDPT3—a MATLAB software package for semidefinite programming, version 1.3. Interior point methods". Optim. Methods Softw. 11/12 (1999), no. 1–4, 545–581.
- Tütüncü, R. H.; Toh, K. C.; Todd, M. J., "Solving semidefinite-quadratic-linear programs using SDPT3. Computational semidefinite and second order cone programming: the state of the art". Math. Program. 95 (2003), no. 2, Ser. B, 189–217.
- Toh, K. C.; Yun, S., "An accelerated proximal gradient algorithm for nuclear norm regularized linear least squares problems". Pac. J. Optim. 6 (2010), no. 3, 615–640.
- Todd, M. J.; Toh, K. C.; Tütüncü, R. H., "On the Nesterov-Todd direction in semidefinite programming". SIAM J. Optim. 8 (1998), no. 3, 769–796.
- Zhao, X.-Y.; Sun, D.; Toh, K. C., "A Newton-CG augmented Lagrangian method for semidefinite programming". SIAM J. Optim. 20 (2010), no. 4, 1737–1765.
- Driscoll, T. A.; Toh, K. C.; Trefethen, L. N., "From potential theory to matrix iterations in six steps". SIAM Rev. 40 (1998), no. 3, 547–578.
