= Kayarat Saikrishnan =

Indian structural biologist

Kayarat Saikrishnan is an Indian structural biologist, a Professor in the Department of Biology and the dean of student and campus activities in Indian Institute of Science Education and Research, Pune (IISER, Pune). He was awarded the Shanti Swarup Bhatnagar Prize for Science and Technology for the year 2019 in Biological Sciences "for his outstanding contributions in the area of structural biology by providing remarkable insights into the functioning of restriction-modification enzymes, which play a crucial role in bacterial defense".

Kayarat Saikrishnan secured Ph D in Molecular Biophysics from Indian Institute of Science, Bangalore in 2005 under the supervision of M. Vijayan. He then worked as a Post-doctoral fellow in cancer research in the Clare Hall Laboratories, South Mimms, UK until 2009 and then served as visiting scientist, MRC Laboratory of Molecular Biology, Cambridge, UK. He joined IISER, Pune as an assistant professor in 2010 and promoted as associate professor in 2016.

== Research ==
Biological processes involving nucleic acid employ enzymes driven by motors energized by the hydrolysis of nucleoside triphosphate (NTP). Many of these enzymes which are sometimes referred to as protein machines have modular functional domains that act in concert to carry out a specific task. Disturbances in the coordination of these machines can be disastrous to the cell. Saikrishnan's research is focused on understanding how the mechanism of these complex enzymes coordinate their action and function. The tools of structural biology, biochemistry and biophysics are used the research. One of the model systems that is being studied is the NTP-dependent restriction-modification (RM) enzyme, a bacterial defense system against invading foreign DNA, such as bacteriophage DNA. These enzymes coordinate the activities of four functional domains – nuclease, helicase-like NTPase motor, methyltransferase and target recognition domain (TRD). Saikrishnan's team recently determined the first crystal structure of such an enzyme, the Type ISP RM enzyme. Biochemical and single-molecule biophysical studies carried out based on the structure revealed a new mechanism of double-strand DNA-break formation resulting from multiple nicks of the DNA strands.

== Awards ==
In 2020, Saikrishnan became a laureate of the Asian Scientist 100 by the Asian Scientist.
