= Dishant Mayurbhai Pancholi =

Indian mathematician and scholar

Dishant Mayurbhai Pancholi is a professor in the Institute of Mathematical Sciences, Chennai with research interests in contact and symplectic topology. Before taking up the position in The Institute Of Mathematical Sciences in 2016, Pancholi was an assistant professor at Chennai Mathematical Institute. He is also a von Newmann Fellow at the Institute for Advanced Study in Princeton, New Jersey. The Singapore based magazine Asian Scientist selected Pancholi in 2020 for their Asian Scientist 100 list as a top researcher in Asia. Pancholi was awarded the Shanti Swarup Bhatnagar Prize for Science and Technology in Mathematical Sciences in the year 2019.

Pancholi obtained his PhD degree from School of Mathematics, Tata Institute of Fundamental Research, Mumbai in 2006 for a thesis titled "Knots, mapping class groups and Kirby calculus", and MSc degree from Maharaja Sayajirao University of Baroda, Vadodara in 1998.

== Honours and recognitions ==
- B M Birla Science prize in 2017
- Shanti Swarup Bhatnagar Prize for Science and Technology in Mathematical Sciences in 2019
