= Lim Kah Leong =

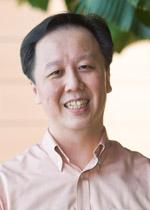
- Prof Lim Kah Leong at Duke-NUS
- Born: Lim Kah Leong; Singapore
- Education: Johns Hopkins University, Harvard University, IMCB
- Occupations: Academic, Scientist
- Website: www.lkcmedicine.ntu.edu.sg/aboutus/Faculty-and-Staff/Pages/Lim-Kah-Leong.aspx

Lim Kah Leong, is a Singaporean neuroscientist and Professor at the Nanyang Technological University (Singapore), where he is also a President's Chair Professor in Translational Neuroscience. He was previously the Vice Dean for Research at the Lee Kong Chian School of Medicine at NTU, Chair of the Department of Physiology at the National University of Singapore, Singapore and the deputy director for research at the National Neuroscience Institute, Singapore. Dr. Lim is known for his research in Parkinson's Disease. His research focuses on unraveling the molecular mechanisms underlying neurodegenerative diseases, with the view to develop novel therapies aimed at effectively treating the disease.

== Academic background ==
Dr Lim obtained his PhD from the Institute of Molecular and Cellular Biology, Singapore under Dr. Catherine Pallen and performed his postdoctoral studies at the department of Neurology, Johns Hopkins School of Medicine with Ted M. Dawson and the department of pathology, Harvard Medical School. He returned in to Singapore in 2002 to lead a laboratory at the National Neuroscience Institute, Singapore.

== Research ==
His research has focused on identifying the molecular events underlying Parkinson's disease (PD). He co-led the creation of the first two-photon, small molecule fluorogenic probe that can serve as a useful tool for the rapid assessment of an individual's potential risk for Parkinson's disease. He has also pioneered the use of umbilical cord lining stem cells to create new dopamine producing neurons in mice. He has also studied the relationship between Parkinson's Disease and cancer and has uncovered the role of a tumor suppressor known as parkin in brain cancer.

== Awards and recognition ==
Prof. Lim Kah Leong has been awarded the Outstanding Mentor Award from the Science Mentorship Program, Ministry of Education, Singapore in 2008. He was also awarded the Khoo Discovery Award by the Khoo Teck Puat Foundation, Duke-NUS, Singapore the same year. His team was awarded the NMRC Translational and Clinical Research Flagship Programme Grant of S$25 million for their work on the degenerative neurological disease Parkinson's in 2014. He also leads a S$10 million 5-year program in regenerative medicine for Parkinson's disease and Age-related Macular Degeneration funded by the National Research Foundation in 2020. In 2018, he was awarded Singapore's highest accolade in science, the President's Science Award. In 2019, he became a laureate of the Asian Scientist 100 by the Asian Scientist.
