= Zhang Fusuo =

Chinese plant nutritionist

- 张福锁
- Born: 4 October 1960 (age 65); Fengxiang County, Shaanxi, China
- Education: Northwest A&F University; China Agricultural University; University of Hohenheim
- Scientific career
- Fields: Plant nutrition
- Workplaces: China Agricultural University

Chinese name
- Simplified Chinese: 张福锁
- Traditional Chinese: 張福鎖
Transcriptions
Standard Mandarin
- Hanyu Pinyin: Zhāng Fúsuǒ

Zhang Fusuo (born 4 October 1960) is a Chinese plant nutritionist who is a professor at China Agricultural University and director of Resource Environment and Food Security Research Center, and an academician of the Chinese Academy of Engineering.

== Biography ==
Zhang was born in Fengxiang County (now Fengxiang District), Shaanxi, on 4 October 1960. In September 1978, he attended Northwest Agricultural College (now Northwest A&F University), graduating in 1982 with a bachelor's degree. He went on to receive his master's degree from Beijing Agricultural University (now China Agricultural University) in 1985. He arrived in Germany in February 1986 to begin his education at the University of Hohenheim, earning a doctor's degree under the supervision of Professor Hurst Maschner in October 1989. He carried out postdoctoral research at China Agricultural University in January 1990.

He was appointed associate professor of China Agricultural University in December 1991, becoming full professor in December 1993 and dean of School of Resources and Environment in January 1997. He was honored as a Distinguished Young Scholar by the National Science Fund for Distinguished Young Scholars in 1994. He was appointed as a "Chang Jiang Scholar" (or " Yangtze River Scholar") by the Ministry of Education of the People's Republic of China in 2001. In December 2012, he became director of Resource Environment and Food Security Research Center.

== Honours and awards ==
- 1998 State Science and Technology Progress Award (Third Class)
- 2005 State Natural Science Award (Second Class)
- 2008 State Science and Technology Progress Award (Second Class)
- 2014 Member of the International Eurasian Academy of Sciences
- 2016 Asian Scientist 100, Asian Scientist
- 2017 Science and Technology Progress Award of the Ho Leung Ho Lee Foundation
- 27 November 2017 Member of the Chinese Academy of Engineering (CAE)
- 28 November 2018 Fellow of The World Academy of Sciences
