= Subimal Ghosh =

Indian academic

Subimal Ghosh is Institute Chair Professor in the Department of Civil Engineering and Convener of the Interdisciplinary Program in Climate Studies at Indian Institute of Technology Bombay with research interests in hydrology and hydro-climatology. He obtained PhD degree in 2007 from Indian Institute of Science, Bangalore on a thesis titled "Hydrologic Impacts of Climate Change: Uncertainty Modelling", and ME degree in 2004 from the same institute.

The Council of Scientific and Industrial Research, the apex agency of the Government of India for scientific research, awarded him the Shanti Swarup Bhatnagar Prize for Science and Technology, one of the highest Indian science awards, for his contributions to Earth, Atmosphere, Ocean and Planetary Sciences in 2019.

== Awards and recognitions ==
The awards and honours conferred on Subimal Ghosh include:

- Institute Chair Professor from March 2021.
- Asian Scientist 100, Asian Scientist, 2020
- American Geophysical Union Devendra Lal Memorial Award in 2020 for “outstanding Earth and/or space sciences research by a scientist belonging to and working in a developing country”
- Conferred Fellow of American Geophysical Union
- Shanti Swarup Bhatnagar Prize in 2019 in Earth, Atmospheric and Planetary Sciences
- Swarnajayanti Fellowship 2018-19 in Earth, Atmospheric and Planetary Sciences
- Lead Author of Intergovernmental Panel on Climate Change (IPCC) Working Group – I for Assessment Report 6 (2018-22)
- National Academy of Science India (NASI) Platinum Jubilee Young Scientist Award 2013 in Electronics, Computer and Engineering Sciences
- Young Scientist Award 2012 from Indian National Science Academy (INSA) in Engineering and Technology,
- Indian National Academy of Engineers (INAE) Young Engineer Award 2011.
