= Cui Tiejun =

Chinese scientist (born 1965)

- Born: September 1965 (age 60); Luanping County, Hebei, China
- Education: Xidian University
- Scientific career
- Fields: Electromagnetic field Microwave technology
- Workplaces: School of Information Science & Engineering, Southeast University

Chinese name
- Traditional Chinese: 崔鐵軍
- Simplified Chinese: 崔铁军
Transcriptions
Standard Mandarin
- Hanyu Pinyin: Cuī Tiějūn

Cui Tiejun (Chinese: 崔铁军; born September 1965) is a Chinese electrical engineer specializing in electromagnetic field and microwave technology. He is the deputy director of Southeast University's State Key Laboratory of Millimeter Waves and the Synergetic Innovation Center of Wireless Communication Technology and deputy dean of School of Information Science & Engineering.

== Education ==
Cui was born in Luanping County, Hebei in September 1965. He earned his bachelor's degree in 1987, an master's degree in 1989, and doctor's degree in 1993, all in electrical engineering and all from Xidian University. From 1995 to 1997 he received grants from Alexander von Humboldt Foundation as a Humboldt Research Fellow at Karlsruhe University. He was a postdoctoral fellow at the University of Illinois at Urbana-Champaign from 1997 to 1999, and was a research scientist since 2000.

== Career ==
In October 2001 he was hired as a professor and doctoral supervisor at the School of Information Science & Engineering, Southeast University.

He was a delegate to the 12th National People's Congress. In December 2017, he was elected a member of the 14th Central Committee of Jiu San Society.

== Honours and awards ==
- 2002 National Science Fund for Distinguished Young Scholars
- 2014 State Natural Science Award (Second Class)
- 2015 Fellow of the Institute of Electrical and Electronics Engineers (IEEE) for contributions to microwave metamaterials and computational electromagnetics.
- 2018 State Natural Science Award (Second Class)
- November 22, 2019 Member of the Chinese Academy of Sciences (CAS)
- 2025 Asian Scientist 100
