= Akira Toriumi =

Japanese engineer

Akira Toriumi is an engineer at the University of Tokyo, Japan. He was named a Fellow of the Institute of Electrical and Electronics Engineers (IEEE) in 2016 for his contributions to device physics and materials engineering for advanced CMOS technology. He was recognized on the Asian Scientist 100 in 2017 by Asian Scientist.
