= Tadashi Hattori =

Japanese ophthalmologist

Tadashi Hattori (born 1964) is a Japanese ophthalmologist who has provided free cataract and other surgery to approximately 20,000 needy people in Vietnam, Philippines, Myanmar and other Asian countries.

== Personal ==
He was born in Osaka Prefecture, Japan in 1964.

When he was in his second year of high school, his father died from stomach cancer, and Hattori was deeply shocked by the cold attitude of the doctors at the hospital. This experience strongly motivated him to become a doctor who truly empathizes with patients.

== Career ==
After graduating from Osaka Prefectural Shijonawate High School, he spent four years studying for entrance exams before being admitted to Kyoto Prefectural University of Medicine, where he graduated in 1993. Subsequently, he worked at various hospitals in Japan.

In October 2001, he met a Vietnamese doctor at the Society of Clinical Ophthalmology held at his alma mater, Kyoto Prefectural University of Medicine, who asked him to treat patients and train other ophthalmologists in Vietnam. In April 2002, he traveled to Vietnam as a volunteer for what he intended to be three months.

He did not receive any compensation for working in Vietnam, and paid out of his own pocket for travel, accommodation and equipment that he donated to hospitals, even using the savings he had accumulated to buy an apartment.

After exhausting his savings, Hattori returned to Japan, where he worked as a freelance doctor at various hospitals in Japan for a few months to cover his expenses, then worked in Vietnam as a volunteer, which he continues to do. Hattori spends about two weeks every month in Vietnam, going back and forth from Japan, and performs about 800 operations per year in Vietnam. He has world-class skills in eye operations using an endoscope. Since an endoscope includes a video monitor, other doctors are able to watch the operation as it takes place, thus improving their own skills.

After encountering resistance from potential donors who would only make donations to a charitable organization, in 2003 he, together with other doctors, founded the Asia Prevention of Blindness Association.

In 2014, he established the Japan International Eye Hospital in Hanoi, equipping it with state-of-the-art medical supplies to significantly elevate local health care standards.

In 2015, he became a specially appointed professor at Kyoto Prefectural University of Medicine and, in the same year, was an invited professor at the Graduate School of Medicine, Osaka University.

Since 2002, he and his team of volunteer doctors and nurses have restored eyesight by providing surgery at no cost to an estimated 20,000 poor patients who could not afford it, most of them with severe cataracts, primarily in Vietnam but also in other Asian countries including Philippines, Indonesia, Laos, Myanmar and Mongolia. Dr. Hattori has also helped numerous doctors to improve their surgical skills.

Through the Asia Prevention of Blindness Association, he has also provided ophthalmological equipment to various hospitals.

Dr. Hattori has also given lectures at many medical conferences and to professional groups, universities and high schools.

== Awards and honors ==
2005: Commendation from Japanese Foreign Minister Machimura for contributions to international medical activities.

2006: The 16th Miyazawa Kenji Ihatov Prize.

2007: People’s Health Medal from the Vietnamese Ministry of Health.

2008: Academia Prize from the National Association of Japanese Academics

2008: Outstanding Service of Prevention of Blindness Award at Asia-Pacific Ophthalmology Conference.

2008: Nakasone Yasuhiro Encouragement Prize from the Institute for International Peace Studies.

2012: Selected by the Japanese Cabinet Office as one of the Japanese People Active in the World Promoting Japan for “his outstanding activities in the international community and his contributions to promoting Japan around the world.”

2013: The 20th Yomiuri International Cooperation Prize.

2014: Friendship Medal from the Vietnamese government, the highest honor a foreigner can receive.

2014: Japan Ophthalmological Society President’s Award.

2014: When President Truong Tan Sang of Viet Nam visited Japan as a state guest, Dr. Hattori attended a palace dinner hosted by both Emperors of Japan.

2015: Social Contribution Award in the International Medical Category at the 11th Healthy Society Awards.

2016: Featured in the 17th volume of the Japanese government’s public relations magazine, “We Are Tomodachi.”

2018: During the state visit of Vietnam’s Chairman Quang to Japan, Dr. Hattori attended the palace dinner hosted by both Emperors of Japan.

2022: Received the Ramon Magsaysay Award from the Philippines. This award is informally known as “Asia’s Nobel Prize.” This award includes a cash award of US$50,000 which Doctor Hattori donated to the Asian Prevention of Blindness Association.

2024: Conferred the title of Honorary Citizen of Thua Thien Hue Province (Vietnam).

Various years: Numerous certificates of commendation and letters of appreciation from Quang Ninh Province, Tinh Quang Province, Hai Phong City, Hue City, Ninh Thuan Province, Ca Mau Province, Vinh Phuc Province, Binh Phuoc Province, Bac Can Province, and Thai Nguyen Province.
