= Sun Sumei (engineer) =

Electrical engineer

Sun Sumei is an electrical engineer from the Institute for Infocomm Research in Singapore. She was named a Fellow of the Institute of Electrical and Electronics Engineers (IEEE) in 2016 for her work in the design and standardization of wireless communication systems. In 2024, she became a laureate of the Asian Scientist 100 by the Asian Scientist.
