= Xiaodong Chen (materials scientist) =

Singaporean materials scientist

Xiaodong Chen is a Singaporean materials scientist and Distinguished University Professor at Nanyang Technological University. He holds a primary appointment as Professor of Materials Science and Engineering, Professor of Chemistry and Medicine (by courtesy) at the university. He is a fellow of the Royal Society, the UK’s national academy of sciences, member of the German National Academy of Sciences Leopoldina, fellow of Singapore National Academy of Science, fellow of Academy of Engineering Singapore, fellow of the American Institute for Medical and Biological Engineering (AIMBE).

Chen is known for his development of soft conformal materials for bioelectronic interfaces in elevating the sensing capability of sensor systems beyond human senses, and contributions to material science, chemistry, nanotechnology, energy storage and flexible electronics.

== Career ==
Chen received his B.S. degree in Chemistry from Fuzhou University, China, his M.S. in Physical Chemistry from the Institute of Chemistry, the Chinese Academy of Sciences, China, and his PhD in Biochemistry (Summa Cum Laude) from the University of Münster, Germany. In 2006, he was a postdoctoral research fellow at the Department of Chemistry, Northwestern University, USA, where he worked with Professor Chad Mirkin on molecular electronics based on nanomaterials. In 2009, He started his professorship career at Nanyang Technological University, Singapore

His current roles include the director of the Innovative Centre for Flexible Devices (iFLEX) at NTU, the director of Max Planck – NTU Joint Lab for Artificial Senses and the deputy director of the Singapore Hybrid-Integrated Next-Generation μ-Electronics (SHINE) Center at NTU. He is also the Editor-in-chief of ACS Nano. He was the Scientific Director at the Institute of Materials Research and Engineering, Agency for Science, Technology and Research (A*STAR) between 2021 and 2023.

== Research ==
Chen's research uses artificial intelligence-based multi-modal sensing fusion, which involves using highly efficient sensing techniques merged with machine learning and vast high-quality data sets, a cornerstone to mimic the sensitivity of human perception. He integrated nanomaterial design and algorithm development to create the plant-based robot, and enabled the synthesis of artificial neurons that receive/release the neurotransmitter dopamine. He uses material development to derive a biphasic nano-dispersed interface (BIND interface) that performs as a 'plug-and-play' universal connector for assembling stretchable devices efficiently in a snap fit manner. He has also worked on"Water-Responsive Supercontractile Polymer Films for Bioelectronic Interfaces".

== Awards and honours ==
- Advanced Materials Hall of Fame, Wiley-VCH, 2018
- Friedrich Wilhelm Bessel Research Award, the Alexander von Humboldt Foundation, 2019
- Fellow of Academy of Engineering Singapore, 2020
- Singapore President's Science Award, 2021
- IUMRS Frontier Materials Scientists Award, 2022
- Award for Solid State Chemistry & Materials, Singapore National Institute of Chemistry (SNIC), 2022
- Fellow of Singapore National Academy of Science (SNAS), 2022
- Nano Energy Award, 2023
- Dan Maydan Prize for Nanoscience Research, 2023
- Nanyang Research Award, 2023
- NRF Investigatorship, National Research Foundation of Singapore, 2024
- Elected member of the German National Academy of Sciences Leopoldina, 2024
- Fellow of the American Institute for Medical and Biological Engineering (AIMBE), 2024
- Fellow of the Royal Society, 2025
