= Karnataka Science and Technology Academy =

- Abbreviation: KSTA
- Formation: 30 July 2005; 21 years ago
- Type: Governmental, Autonomous, Nonprofit Organization
- Headquarters: Prof. U.R. Rao Vijnana Bhavana, GKVK Campus, Maj. Sandeep Unnikrishnan Road, Vidyaranyapura PO, Doddabettahalli Layout, Bengaluru - 560097
- Location: Bangalore, India
- Region served: Karnataka
- Chairman: Prof. Udupi Ramachandra Rao (2005-2016); Dr S.K. Shivakumar (2016-2019); Prof. S. Ayyappan (2020-2023); Prof. Rajasab A. H. (2024-Present)
- Parent organisation: Department of Science and Technology, Government of Karnataka
- Website: kstacademy.in

The Karnataka Science and Technology Academy (KSTA) is an organization established in 2005 to promote science and technology-related activities in the Indian State of Karnataka. It functions under the Department of Science and Technology of the government of Karnataka. The KSTA organizes programmes and conferences across Karnataka with an aim to "bring scientific awareness" and "popularize... science among general public." The body is headed by a chairman and includes 20 other members, that includes 14 nominated members and 5 ex officio members: secretaries, principal secretaries, and directors of other departments of the government of Karnataka.
