= Shankar Ghosh (physicist) =

Indian physicist

- Born: 28 June 1975 (age 50)
- Awards: S.S. Bhatnagar Prize (2019)
- Scientific career
- Fields: Condensed Matter Physics
- Institutions: Tata Institute of Fundamental Research

Shankar Ghosh (born 28 June 1975) is an Indian physicist, currently associated at the Department of Condensed Matter Physics and Material Science, Tata Institute of Fundamental Research. He is known for his research on experimental condensed matter physics. The Council of Scientific and Industrial Research, the apex agency of the Government of India for scientific research, awarded him the Shanti Swarup Bhatnagar Prize for Science and Technology for his contributions to physical sciences in 2019.

== Awards ==
In 2019, Ghosh was awarded the Shanti Swarup Bhatnagar Prize for Science and Technology for his innovative and unconventional experiments on soft matter. The following year, Ghosh became a laureate of the Asian Scientist 100 by the Asian Scientist.
