= Dhiraj Kumar (scientist) =

Indian medical researcher

Dhiraj Kumar is a Senior Fellow at the International Centre for Genetic Engineering and Biotechnology (ICGEB) and the leader of its Cellular Immunology Team. He is involved in the study and research on mycobacterium tuberculosis infection.

== Education ==
Dhiraj Kumar obtained his MSc degree from Indian Council of Agricultural Research in 2002 and his PhD degree from ICGEG in 2007.

== Awards and honors ==
He was awarded the Shanti Swarup Bhatnagar Prize for Science and Technology in Medical Sciences in 2019 for his contributions towards better understanding of tuberculosis. The following year, Kumar became a laureate of the Asian Scientist 100 by the Asian Scientist.
