= Nanyang Technological University =

Autonomous university in Singapore

- 南洋理工大学 (Chinese); Universiti Teknologi Nanyang (Malay) நன்யாங் தொழில்நுட்ப பல்கலைக்கழகம் (Tamil)
- Coat of arms
- Former name: Nanyang Technological Institute (1981–1991)
- Type: Public research university
- Established: 8 August 1981; 45 years ago (as Nanyang Technological Institute); 1 July 1991; 35 years ago (as Nanyang Technological University)
- Affiliations: ACU, APRU, ASAIHL, ASPIRE, AUN, DAAD, SATU, STINT, UAiTED, UCMSR, WA, Global Alliance of Technological Universities
- Endowment: S$3.1 billion
- Chancellor: President of Singapore
- President: Ho Teck Hua
- Provost: Christian Wolfrum
- Academic staff: 1,590
- Administrative staff: 6,407
- Students: 43,426 (2026–27)
- Undergraduates: 25,463 (2026–27)
- Postgraduates: 17,963 (2026–27)
- Location: 50 Nanyang Ave, Singapore 639798; 1°20′45″N 103°40′48″E
- Campus: 50 Nanyang Ave, Singapore 639798 (Main campus) 11 Mandalay Road, Singapore 308232 (Novena campus) 11 Slim Barracks Rise, Singapore 138664 (one-north campus)
- Colours: Red; Blue
- Website: ntu.edu.sg

Nanyang Technological University (NTU) is a national public research university in Singapore. Founded in 1981, it is also the second oldest autonomous university in the country.

In response to Singapore’s economic restructuring in the 1970s amid a shortage of engineers, the government established the Nanyang Technological Institute (NTI) in 1981 on the former campus of Nanyang University, with engineering and applied science-focused programmes that emphasised laboratory training and industrial attachments. NTI was elevated to full university status and officially inaugurated as NTU on 1 July 1991 through parliamentary legislation, incorporating the National Institute of Education to support national goals of industrial upgrading and research-intensive higher education in science and technology.

NTU's main campus, located in the west of the country in the Western Water Catchment planning area, covers 200 hectares (2.0 km^{2}; 490 acres) of land, making it the largest university campus in the country. The university also operates a medical campus in Novena, Singapore's healthcare district, and a campus at one-north, NTU@one-north. In the 2026–27 academic year, NTU enrolled 43,426 students in degree programmes, and as at 1 July 2026 it employed 8,659 faculty and staff.

The university is organised into a number of colleges and schools, including the College of Engineering, College of Science, Nanyang Business School, Lee Kong Chian School of Medicine, College of Humanities, Arts and Social Sciences, College of Computing and Data Science, Graduate College, National Institute of Education, S. Rajaratnam School of International Studies, and the NTU Honours College.

NTU reported about S$730 million in competitive research funding for its 2024 financial year. In the Nature Index 2026 Research Leaders tables, it had the second-largest Share among academic institutions in Singapore.

== History ==
=== Nanyang University (1955–1980) ===
The Nanyang University Memorial in Yunnan Garden

Nanyang University (abbreviated Nan-tah, 南大) was founded in 1955 on land donated by the Hokkien Huay Kuan, prior to Singapore's independence from British rule. Conceived as a Chinese-medium university, it was largely supported by the local Chinese community and became the first Chinese-language university in Southeast Asia.

Nanyang University was located south of the present Nanyang Technological University grounds, centered on what is now Yunan Garden. The former administration building of Nanyang University now houses the Chinese Heritage Centre, which has been designated as a national monument.

=== Nanyang Technological Institute (1981–1991) ===
In 1980, Nanyang University merged with the University of Singapore to form the current National University of Singapore. Nanyang Technological Institute (NTI), a tertiary institution affiliated to the National University of Singapore, was formed to take over Nanyang University's campus in 1981.

NTI operated as an engineering institute for a decade and formed the academic and infrastructural foundation for the establishment of Nanyang Technological University.

=== Legacy of Nanyang University (1991) ===
As NTU subsequently grew into a full university, various efforts were made to have it claim the Nanyang University mantle. In 1996, the alumni rolls of Nanyang University were transferred from NUS to NTU. In 1998, the prominent local calligrapher and poet Pan Shou (Chinese: 潘受), who had been the first vice-chancellor of Nanyang University, called for NTU to be renamed Nanyang University, as a way to "quieten the hearts of many" NU alumni.

=== Present form ===
==== Establishment of Nanyang Technological University (1991) ====
In March 1991, the Singapore Parliament approved the formation of Nanyang Technological University. It was officially established on 1 July 1991, with the National Institute of Education (NIE) incorporated into it. The alumni rolls of the former Nanyang University were transferred to NTU in 1996. Historically, Nanyang Technological University admitted students jointly with the affiliated National University of Singapore and charged the same fees. Students made only one application, and they would be accepted by either university. This arrangement ended in 2004 as both universities began to distinguish themselves with an end of its official affiliation. Currently, students apply separately to both universities. NTU became autonomous in 2006 and stands as one of the two largest public universities in Singapore today.

==== Developments in the 21st century ====
Since the early 2000s, NTU has expanded its international engagement, graduate education, and academic profile. In January 2026, China's Ministry of Education approved a joint institute set up by Shanghai Jiao Tong University and NTU in Shanghai's Zhangjiang area, which began admitting students in 2026 under a "2+2" undergraduate model.

Approximately 65% of NTU's faculty and staff are foreign nationals, placing it among the world’s top 100 universities with the highest proportion of international faculty, according to QS. (NTU was ranked joint 3rd in the world on this metric, alongside NUS.)

The university is also highly international in its student body: 31% (8,089) of students are foreign nationals, with 58% of them pursuing postgraduate degrees. It remains one of the few top 100 universities with more than 60% of foreign faculty.

==== Presidents ====
No.	President	Term
1	Cham Tao Soon	1991–2002
2	Su Guaning	2003–2011
3	Bertil Andersson	2011–2017
4	Subra Suresh	2018–2022
5	Ho Teck Hua	2023–present

==== Controversies in the 21st century ====
In 2013, a public debate over academic freedom in Singapore arose after Cherian George, an outspoken academic at the Wee Kim Wee School of Communication and Information known for his criticism of the government, was denied tenure. Although George had been recommended for tenure by the Wee Kim Wee School, his application was rejected by a university-level committee that included representatives from the Government of Singapore. The decision prompted a petition by students at the Wee Kim Wee School, but George's subsequent appeal was rejected by the university.

In 2021, some applications for on-campus hostel accommodations in NTU were rejected due to COVID-19 isolation protocols. The university claimed that the rejections were due to a shortage of housing facilities, which at full capacity was still unable to house every applicant, as rooms were oversubscribed. These rejections raised concerns, especially among international students, as returning students from Academic Year 2020–2021 were not granted on-campus accommodation despite the university's much-publicised policy of guaranteeing all incoming students a minimum of two years of campus housing. NTU eventually reversed their decision on 2 July 2021, prioritising on-campus accommodations for international students that resided on campus at the time, students under scholarship programmes with guaranteed housing, and all Year 1 and 2 students under the guaranteed hall stay policy.

In June 2025, three students taking a course at the School of Social Sciences were given zero marks and found to have committed academic fraud after their essays were judged to have made unauthorised use of generative artificial intelligence. One of the students disputed the finding in a post on Reddit, prompting public discussion about the rules governing AI use at universities. NTU said the assignments contained non-existent references and data, and that it would convene a panel including AI experts to hear the students' appeals. In July 2025, the appeal panel upheld the zero grade given to one of the students.

== Coat of arms ==
On its foundation in July 1991, NTU adopted the Coat of Arms granted to NTI (by the College of Arms of the United Kingdom in November 1982) as its coat of arms.

The Coat of Arms consists of a heraldic shield divided into two sections: the lower portion shows a stalking lion facing the spectator on a white background and the upper portion two atomic symbols, one on either side of a cog-wheel above a battlement on a red background.

It is blazoned:

Argent a lion passant guardant proper on a chief embattled gules a cog-wheel between two conventional representations of an atom argent.

The lion represents close links between NTI and NUS, the battlement represents School of Civil and Structural Engineering, the atoms represents School of Electrical and Electronic Engineering and the cogwheel represents School of Mechanical and Production Engineering.

== Campuses ==
=== Landscape and Architecture ===
Map of key landmarks on NTU's main campus Academic instruction Featured places and health Administration, services and dining Arts venues Housing Libraries and study spaces Sports and recreation

NTU has been listed among the World's Most Beautiful Universities, with the Art, Design and Media (ADM) building featured in a 2012 report by Travel + Leisure.

Much of NTU’s campus layout dates back to the Nanyang Technological Institute (NTI) period between 1981 and 1982, when the master plan—centred on the central academic spine known as the North Spine—was designed by Japanese architect Kenzō Tange the recipient of the 1987 Pritzker Architecture Prize. The North Spine was officially opened in 1986.

Several landmark buildings on campus have since gained international recognition. The ADM building, featured in the Travel + Leisure report, was designed by Singaporean architect Lee Cheng Wee.

The Hive, now the UOB Innovation Hub, is another prominent campus landmark, featured by Times Higher Education, and designed by British designer Thomas Heatherwick. On 25 March 2026 the building was renamed the UOB Innovation Hub; it continues to serve as a learning space with smart classrooms and also houses incubation facilities for start-ups.

UOB Innovation Hub (The Hive)

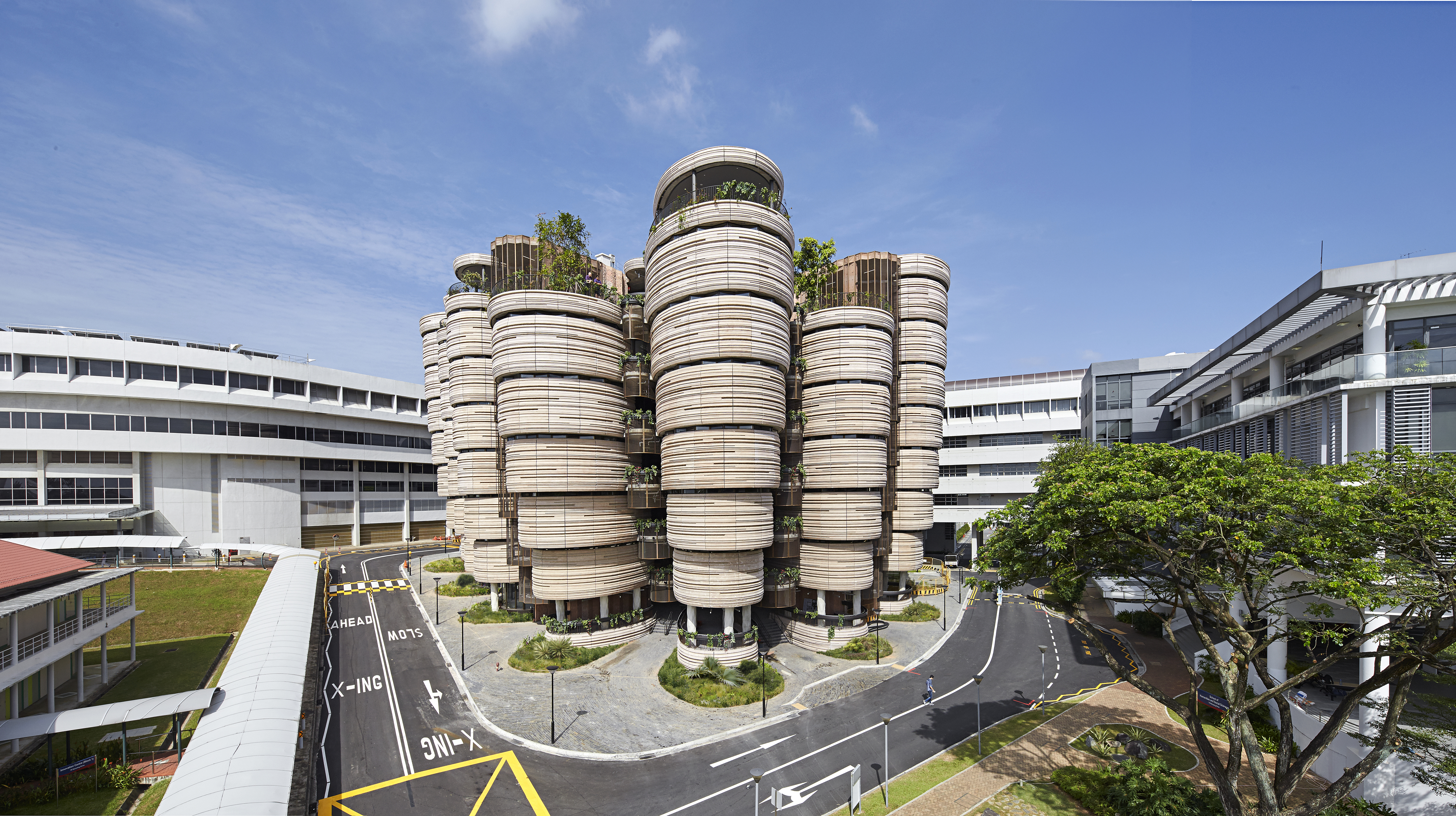
UOB Innovation Hub

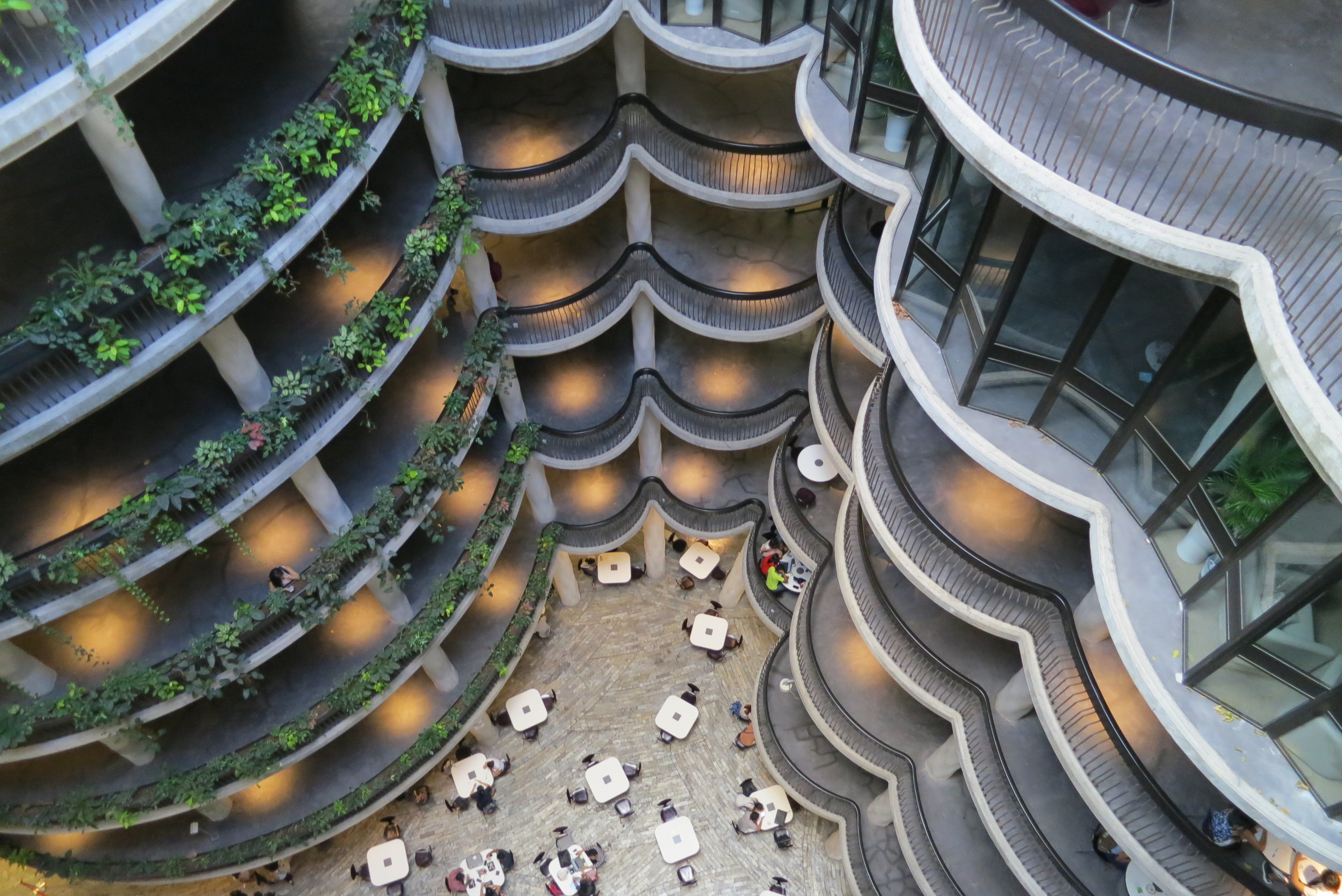
Interior of the UOB Innovation Hub

=== Yunnan Garden Campus ===
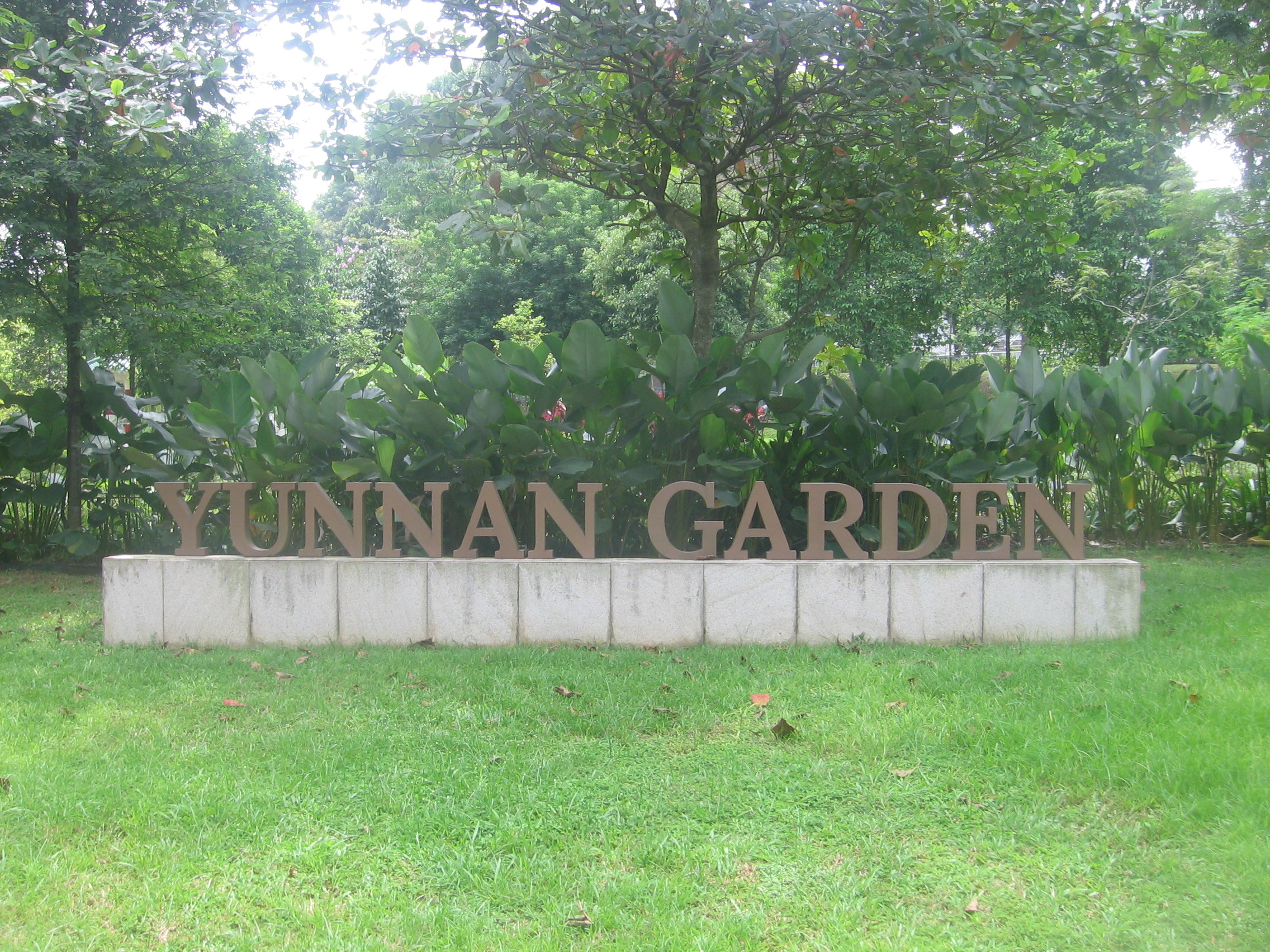
Yunnan Garden Main Entrance

The name "Yunnan Garden" (Chinese: 云南园) predates Nanyang University. According to the Promote Mandarin Council's Singaporean Mandarin Database, the rubber magnate Lim Nee Soon acquired hilly land in Jurong in 1916 and named it Yunnan Garden to commemorate the success of the National Protection War, the campaign launched from Yunnan against Yuan Shikai's attempt to restore the monarchy in China, for which Lim had served as a fundraiser in Southeast Asia. The National Library Board likewise lists a Yunnan Plantation in Jurong among Lim's rubber estates. The Singapore Hokkien Huay Kuan bought the land in the 1950s and, under its chairman Tan Lark Sye, donated it as the site of Nanyang University. The name now refers both to the garden of about 9 hectares in front of the Chinese Heritage Centre and to NTU's main campus.

The former Nanyang University administration building was restored into the Chinese Heritage Centre and was gazetted as a national monument in 1998 – now overlooking the Yunnan Garden. The Yunnan Garden precinct has undergone restoration and redevelopment works that were completed in 2020. This encompassed heritage conservation, landscaped public spaces, and upgraded facilities surrounding the Chinese Heritage Centre. The Nanyang University Memorial and original Nanyang University Arch were also declared national monuments of Singapore in 1998.

The NTU Art & Heritage Museum is an approved public museum under the National Heritage Board's Approved Museum Scheme; benefactors who donate artworks and artefacts to NTU enjoy double tax deductions. There is a small lake between the Chinese Heritage Centre and Hall of Residence 4 called Nanyang Lake. Only members of NTU Anglers' Club permit holder, the fishing club at NTU, are allowed to fish in this lake.

The campus also served as the Youth Olympic Village for the inaugural Youth Olympic Games in 2010.

Architecture/Facilities of NTU

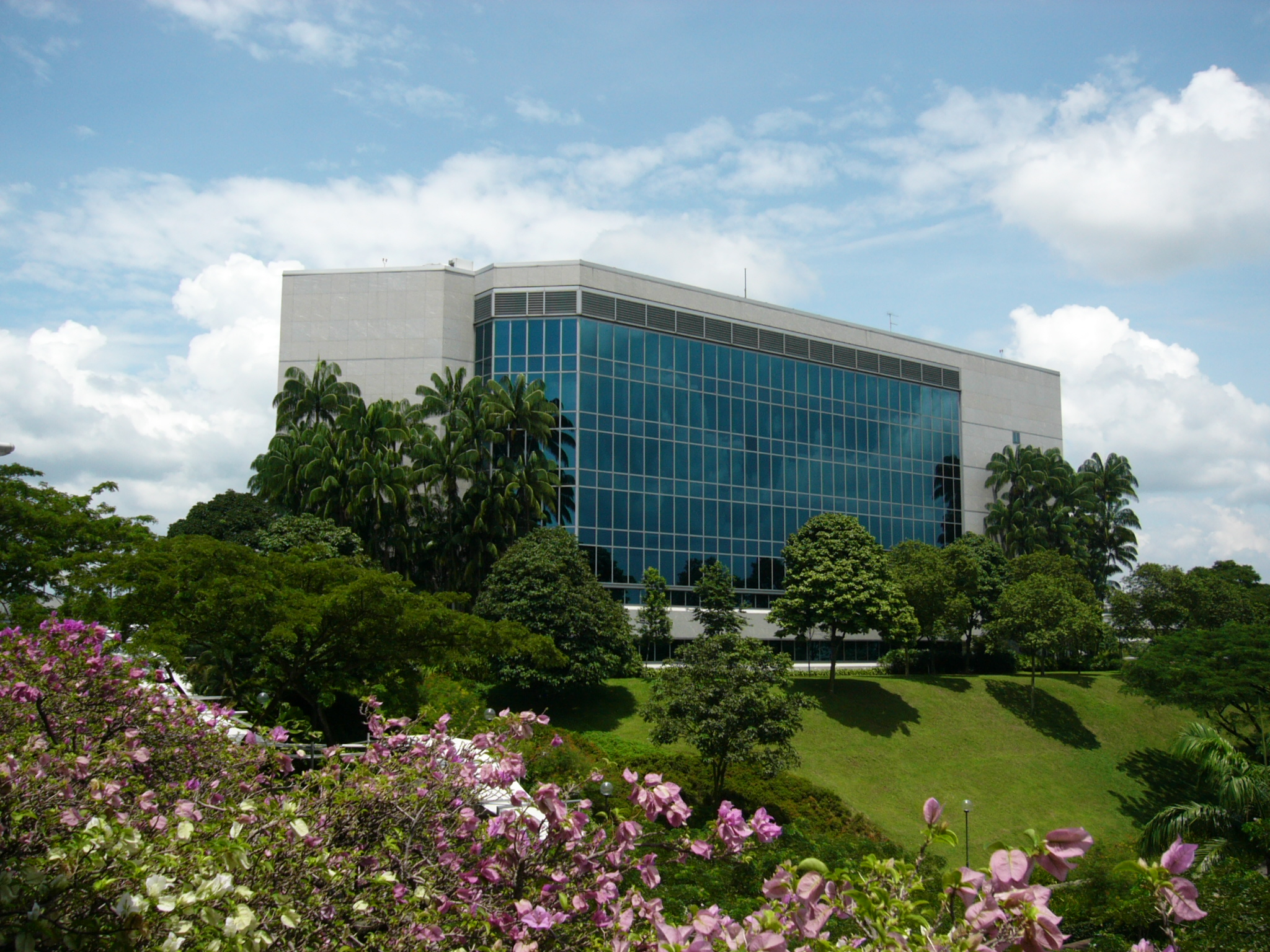
Administration Building of Nanyang Technological University

Chinese Heritage Centre, formerly the Administration Building of Nanyang University

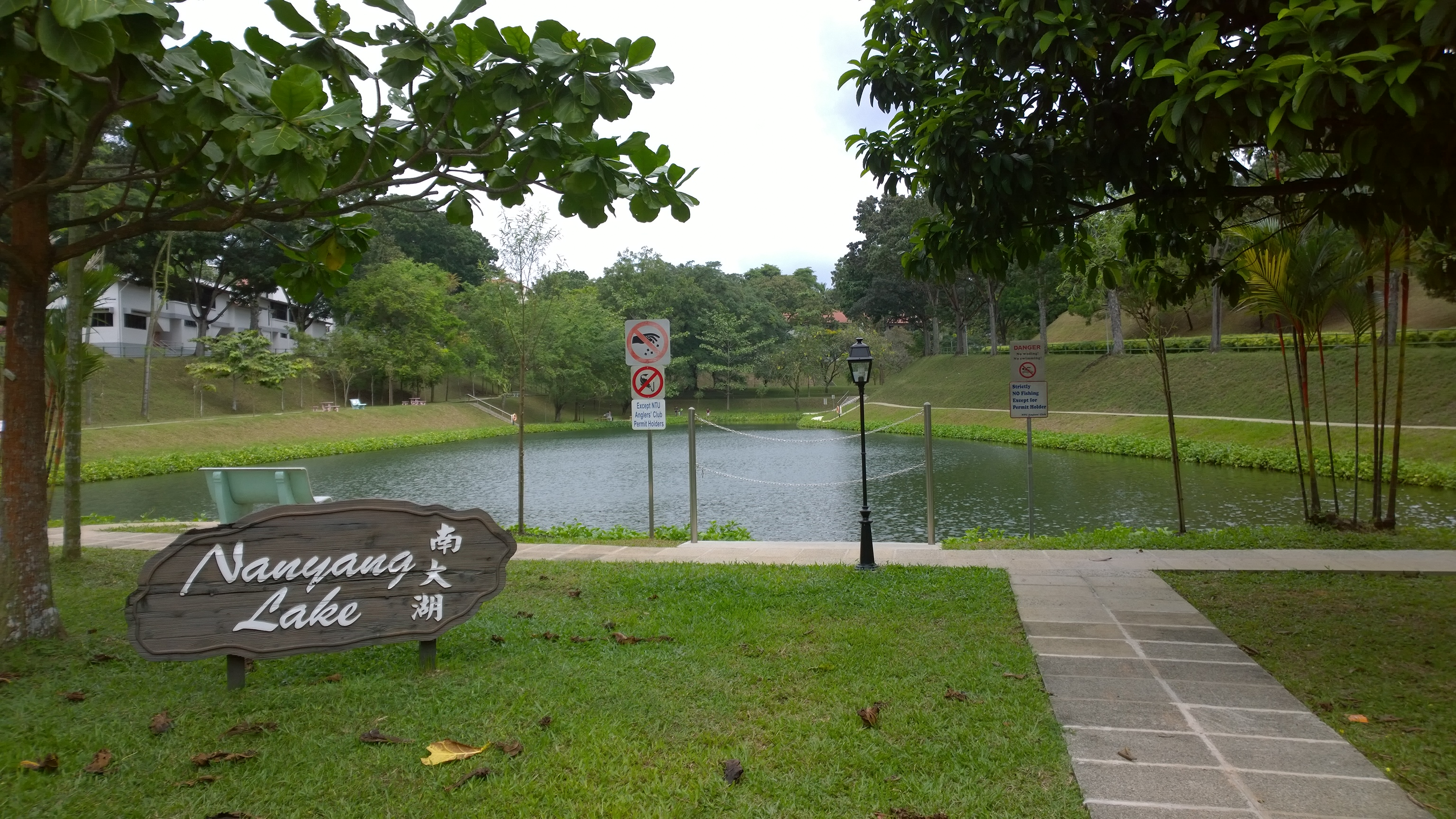
Nanyang Lake

Block N1 of the North Spine

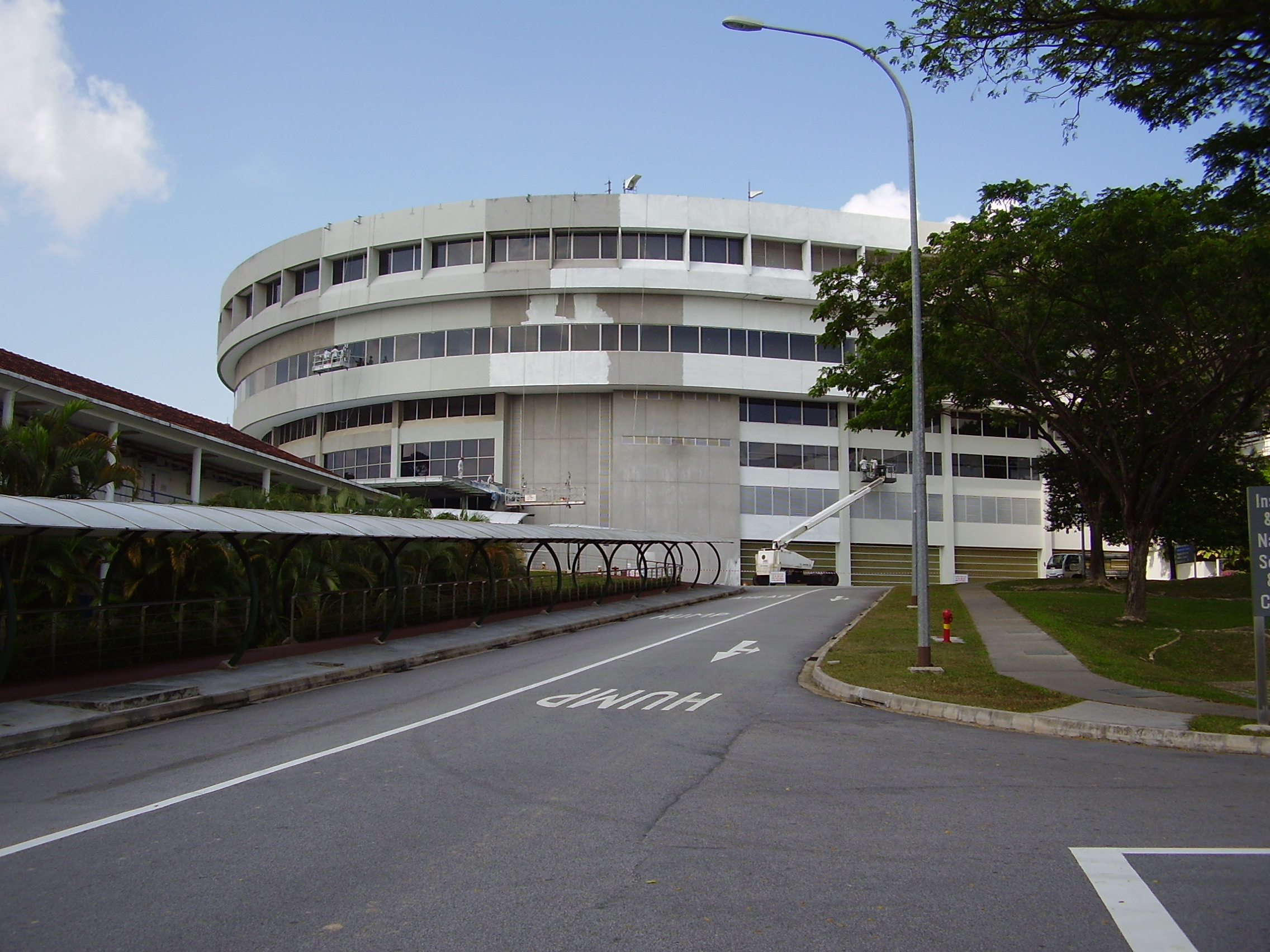
South Spine

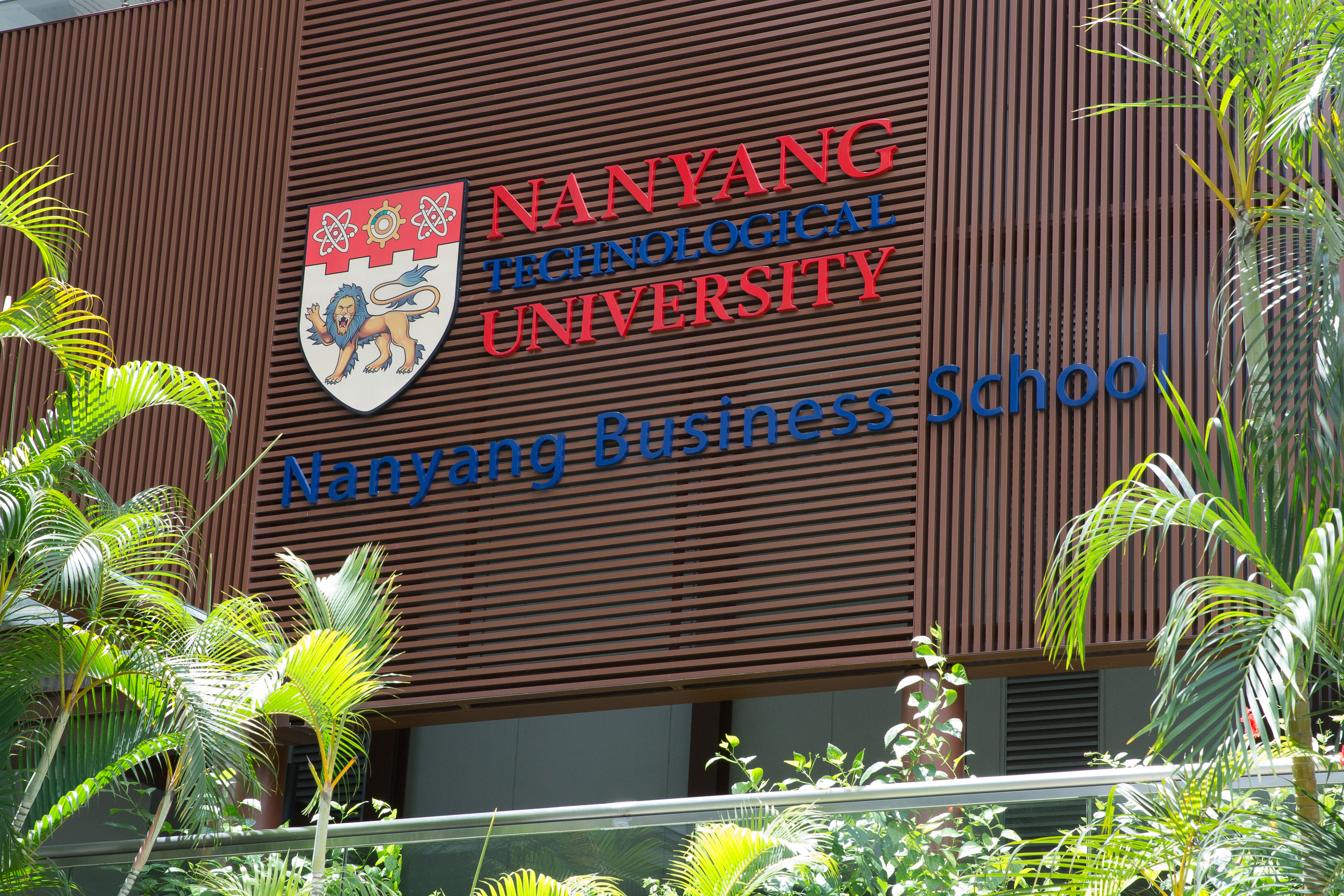
Nanyang Business School

School of Social Sciences

=== One-north campus ===
NTU@one-north in 2007

NTU@one-north, at 11 Slim Barracks Rise in the one-north district, is within walking distance of Buona Vista and one-north MRT stations. It was officially opened as the university's second campus by President S. R. Nathan in May 2007, and housed NTU's Centre for Continuing Education, its Confucius Institute and the NTU Alumni Clubhouse. After a refurbishment that added technology-enhanced rooms for training and meetings and upgraded its recreational facilities, the alumni house reopened in July 2017.

The campus has two wings, the Executive Centre and the Alumni House. The Executive Centre provides venues for seminars, workshops and functions, including a 215-seat auditorium, lecture theatres and seminar rooms, and its eighth floor houses the Confucius Institute. The Alumni House has a 25-metre swimming pool, a gym, tennis courts, a restaurant and sports bar, and a childcare centre.

=== Sustainability ===
On 11 October 2021, NTU published a 15-year Sustainability Manifesto, committing to achieve carbon neutrality by 2035 and to at least halve its gross carbon emissions intensity from its 2019 baseline by the same year. The manifesto also aimed for all eligible buildings on the main campus to attain Green Mark Platinum certification, and for sustainability to be included in the interdisciplinary core curriculum taken by all undergraduates. To fund these goals, the university set up a S$1 billion medium-term note programme. Its first issuance, S$650 million of 15-year notes priced in October 2021, was described by the joint lead managers as the world's first publicly offered sustainability-linked bond issued by a university. A second series of S$350 million 15-year bonds was issued on 30 June 2026. NTU holds an Aaa credit rating from Moody's Investors Service.

== Governance ==
NTU was corporatised in April 2006 under the Nanyang Technological University (Corporatisation) Act 2005, becoming a not-for-profit company limited by guarantee. Its highest governing body is the Board of Trustees. Koh Boon Hwee joined the council of the then statutory university in 1991 and became its chairman in 1993. He was appointed the founding chairman of the Board of Trustees when NTU became autonomous in 2006, and stepped down on 31 March 2021 after 28 years. He was succeeded by Goh Swee Chen, former chairman of Shell Companies in Singapore. The university is headed by the President, who is supported by the Provost, senior vice presidents and vice presidents.

== Colleges and schools ==
College / School	Established
College of Engineering	1991
Nanyang Business School	1991
National Institute of Education	1991
Wee Kim Wee School of Communication and Information	1992
School of Biological Sciences	2001
College of Humanities, Arts, and Social Sciences	2004
School of Physical and Mathematical Sciences	2005
S. Rajaratnam School of International Studies	2007
School of Art, Design and Media	2009
Lee Kong Chian School of Medicine	2013
Asian School of the Environment	2015
Graduate College	2018
College of Computing and Data Science	2024

NTU is organised into several colleges and schools covering engineering, business, science, computing, humanities, education, and medicine.

=== Lee Kong Chian School of Medicine ===
In 2010, NTU announced the formation of a pro-tem governing board to guide the establishment of the Lee Kong Chian School of Medicine, a collaboration with Imperial College London. The medical college was established in 2013. Prior to its opening in 2013, the school received record donations of S$400 million, including S$150 million from the Lee Foundation. The School's primary clinical partner is the National Healthcare Group. In April 2022, NTU announced that its partnership with Imperial College London would end as scheduled in 2028, and that students entering the school from 2024 onwards would receive a medical degree awarded solely by NTU.

=== S. Rajaratnam School of International Studies ===
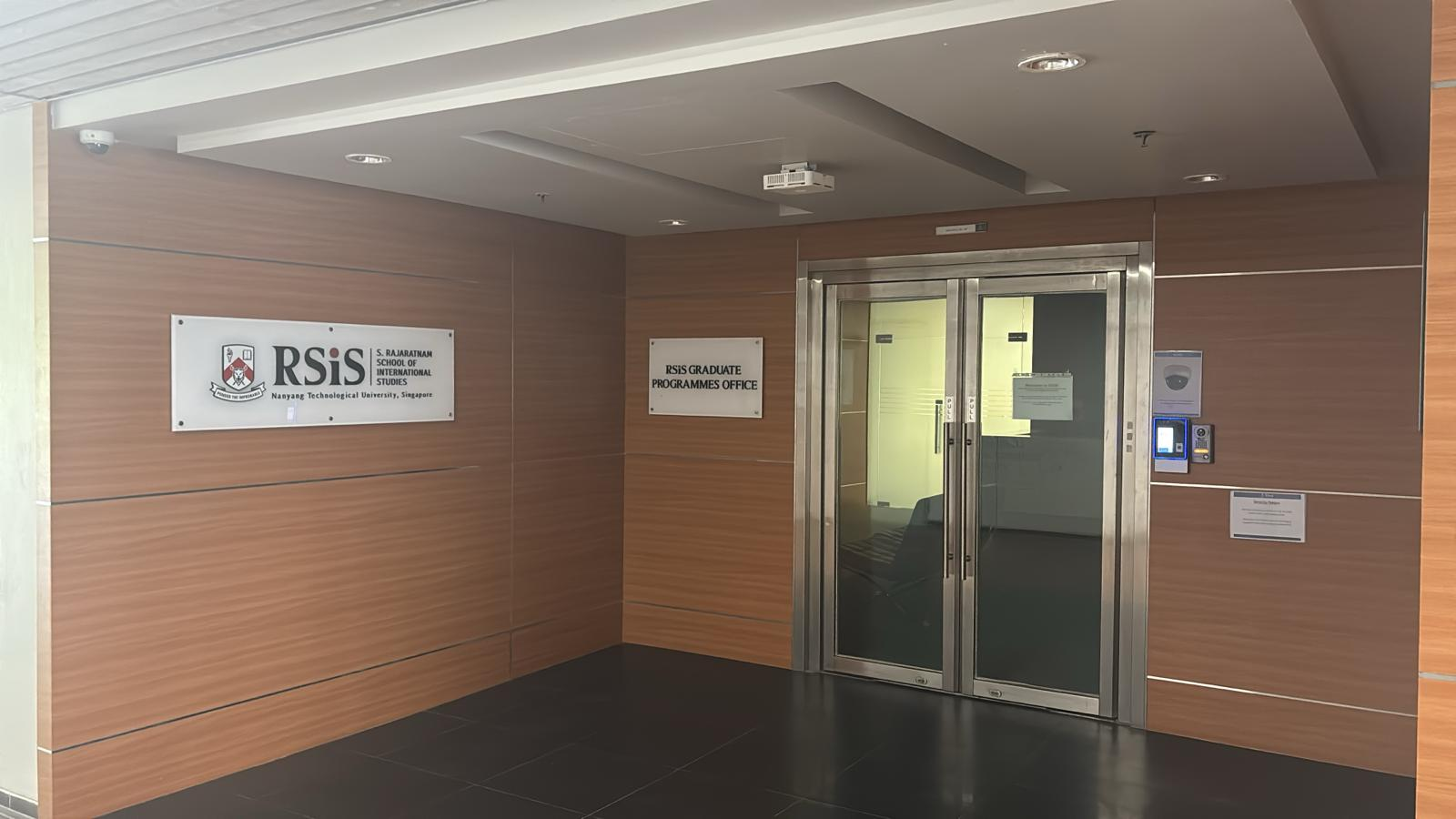
S. Rajaratnam School of International Studies

The S. Rajaratnam School of International Studies (RSIS), named after Singapore's former Deputy Prime Minister and Minister for Foreign Affairs, offers graduate programmes in international relations and is an autonomous graduate institution of NTU. The school has the Institute of Defence and Strategic Studies.

=== Nanyang Business School ===
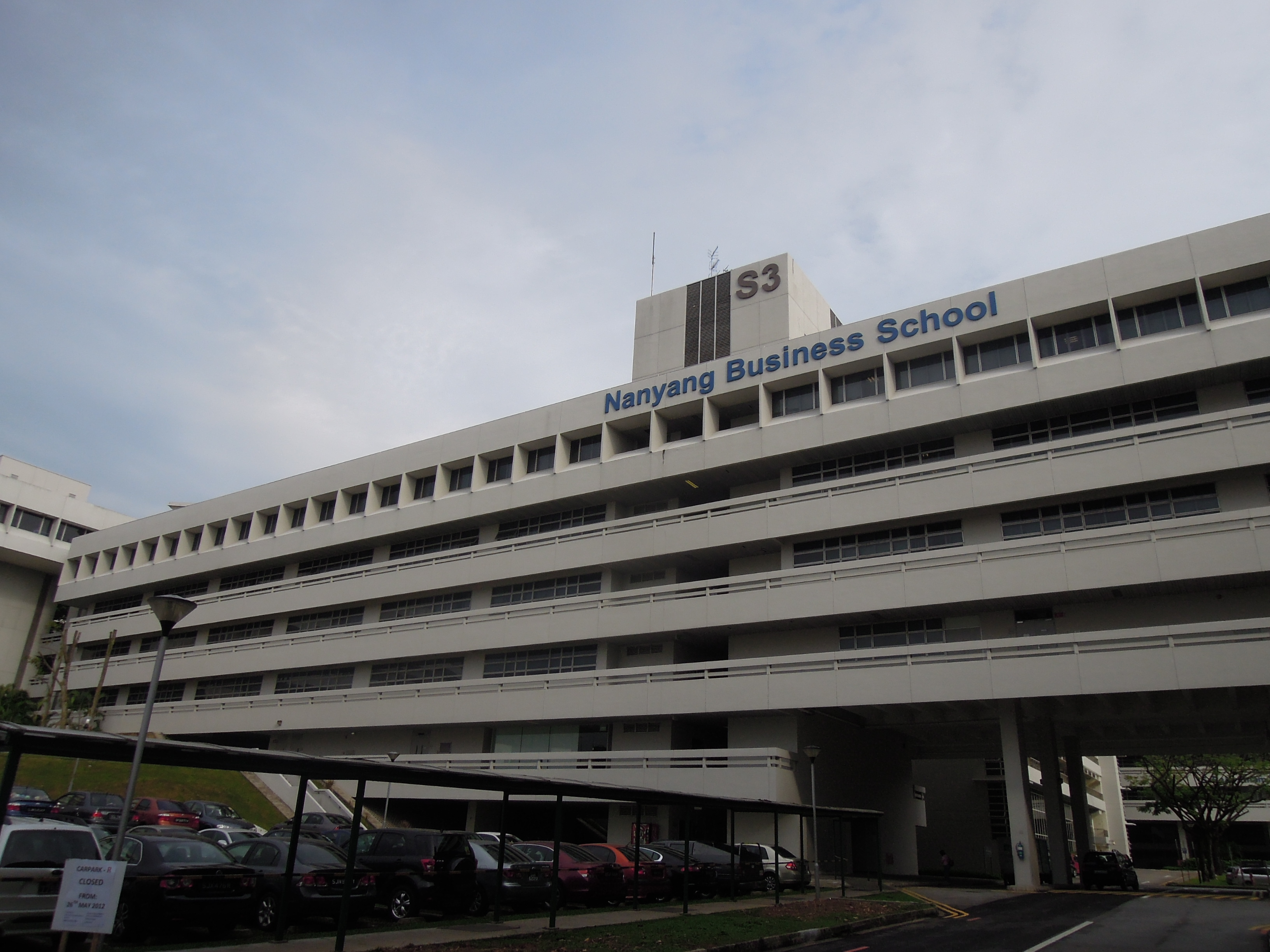
NBS's S3 building

Nanyang Business School (NBS) is the largest business school in Singapore.

NBS houses the 165-square meter Centre for Applied Financial Education, the largest finance lab in Singapore. The lab is equipped with 60 dedicated Thomson Reuters Eikon terminals with Datastream, along with 24 Bloomberg terminals that will allow business students with access to real-time financial, economic and business information.

In May 2023, NTU opened Gaia, a six-storey mass timber building. It is NTU’s eighth zero-energy building and at its opening, the largest wooden building in Asia. In August 2025, to mark 30 years of Nanyang Business School, the building housing the school was named Wee Cho Yaw Plaza in recognition of the late Wee Cho Yaw's contributions to the university.

=== College of Humanities, Arts, and Social Sciences ===
Building of the Wee Kim Wee School of Communication and Information

HASS consists of four schools:

- The Wee Kim Wee School of Communication and Information is a school of communication studies and offers courses in Journalism, Broadcast, Advertising, Communication Policy and Information Studies. It originally established in 1992, and it was named after Singapore's former president Wee Kim Wee in 2006.

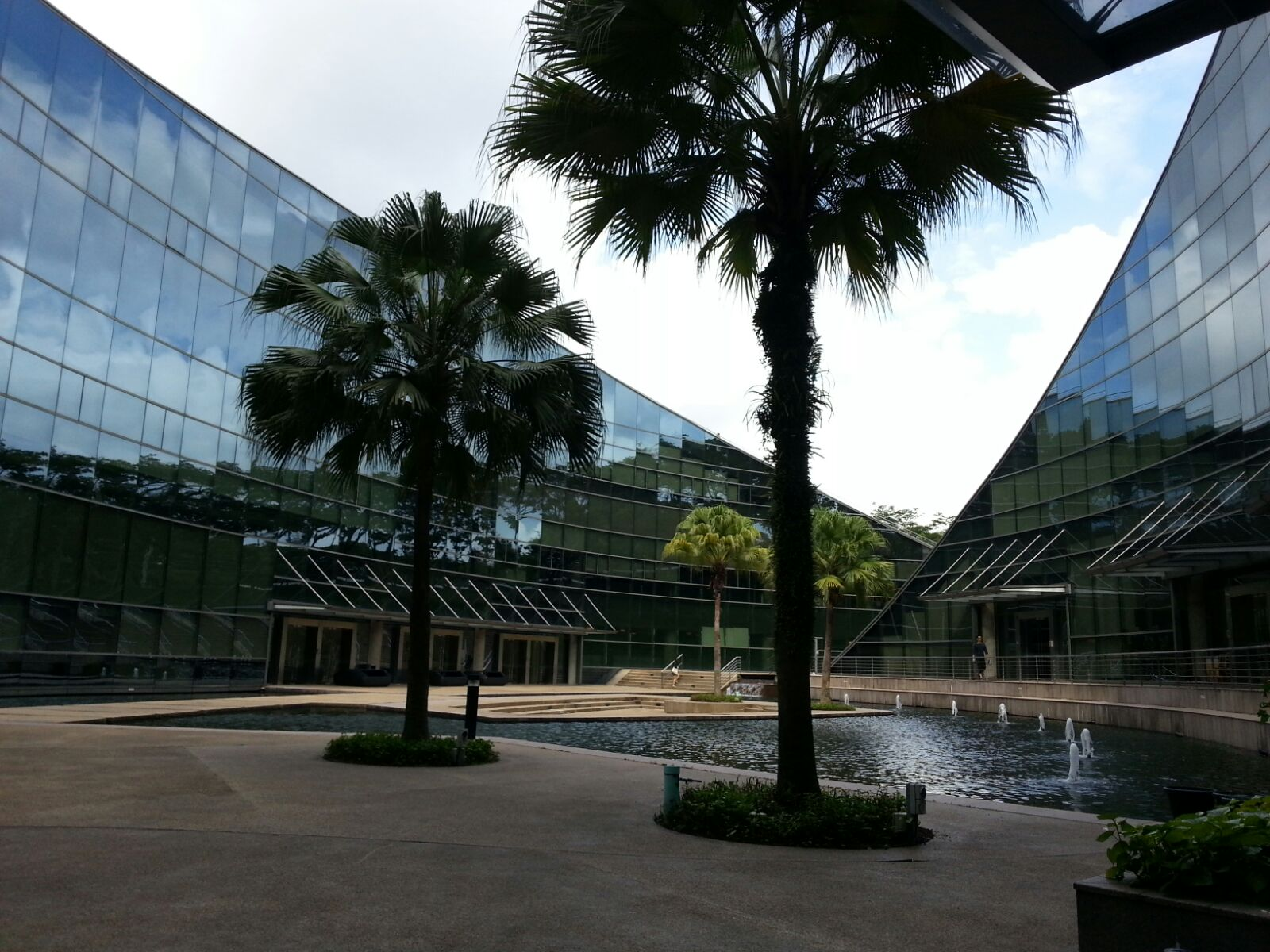
School of Art, Design and Media

- The School of Art, Design and Media is Singapore's first professional art school and offers an undergraduate programmes in Art, Design, and Media, as well as graduate degrees in arts research. Its building, which features a sloping grassy roof surrounding a central courtyard, is frequently featured in NTU's promotional materials.
- In 2016, the School of Humanities and Social Sciences split into 2 separate schools: the School of Humanities (SOH) and School of Social Sciences (SSS) – to accommodate with the rising intake of students.
  - The School of Humanities which offers programmes in a wide variety of fields including Chinese, English Literature, History, Linguistics & Multilingual Studies and Philosophy.
  - The School of Social Sciences which offers Economics, Psychology, Public Policy and Sociology. The School of Social Sciences also houses the Nanyang Centre for Public Administration (NCPA), which focuses on executive education and public-sector leadership.

=== College of Engineering ===
The College of Engineering is NTU's largest subdivision. It has been ranked among the world's top 15 schools of engineering and technology by QS World University Rankings, and claimed to be the world's largest engineering college, with a student population of more than 10,500 undergraduates and 3,500 graduates.

It consists of five schools:

- School of Chemistry, Chemical Engineering and Biotechnology (CCEB),
- School of Civil and Environmental Engineering (CEE),
- School of Electrical and Electronic Engineering (EEE),
- School of Mechanical and Aerospace Engineering (MAE), and
- School of Materials Science and Engineering (MSE).

In addition to the 12 single degree programmes, the college also offers double degrees, double majors and integrated programmes as well as the only aerospace engineering programme in Singapore.

Schools within the College of Engineering

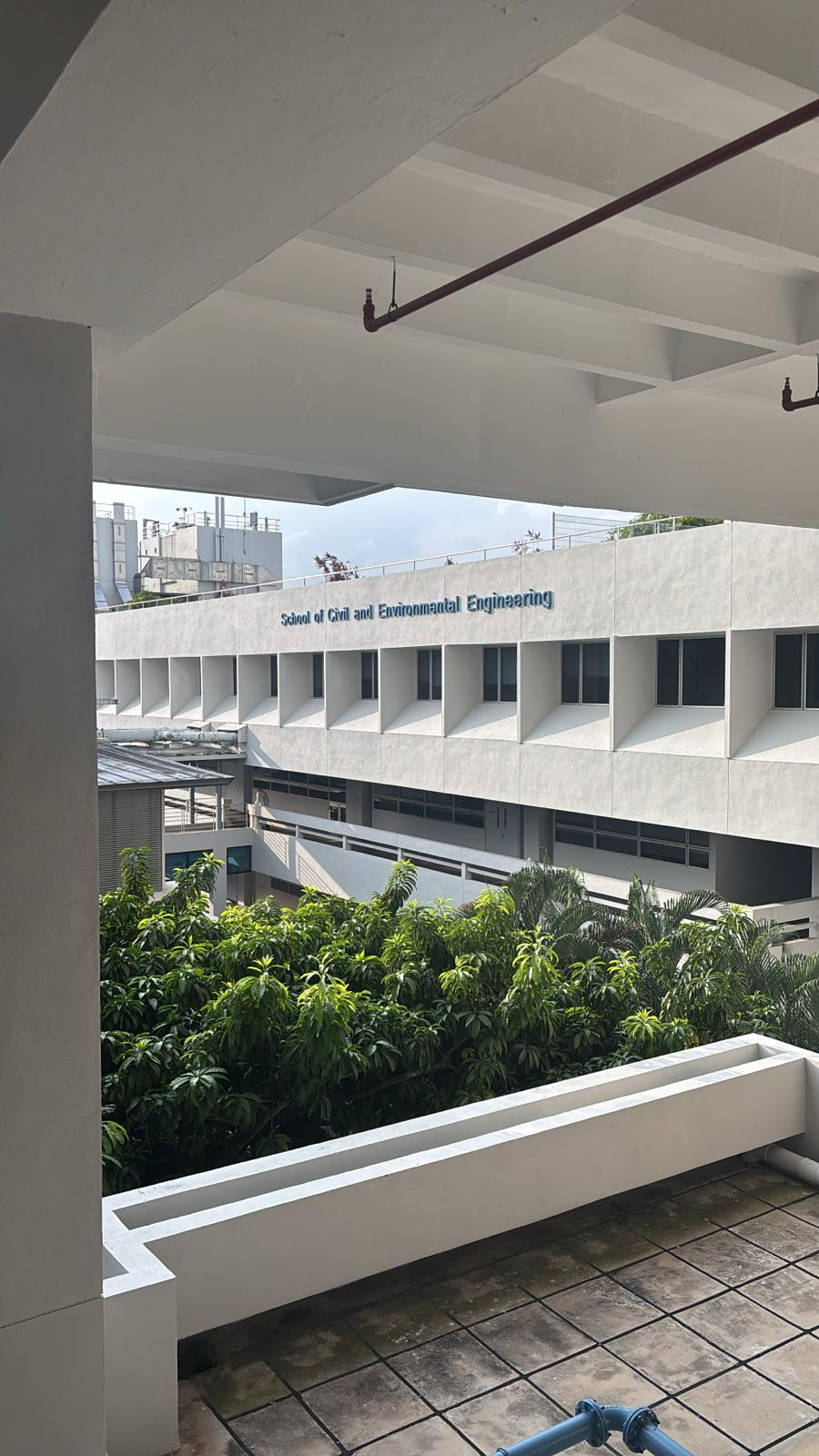
School of Civil and Environmental Engineering (CEE)

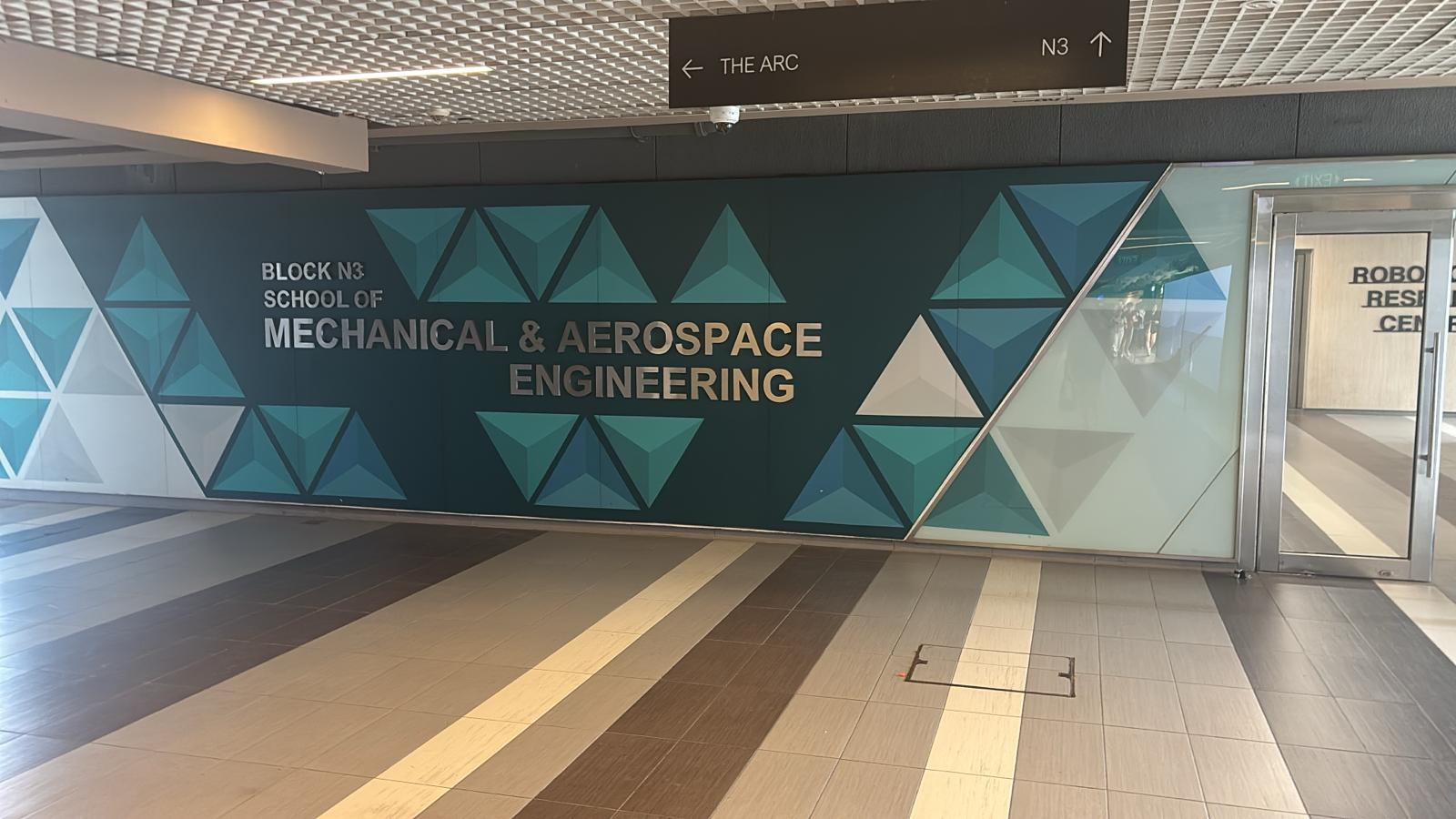
School of Mechanical and Aerospace Engineering (MAE)

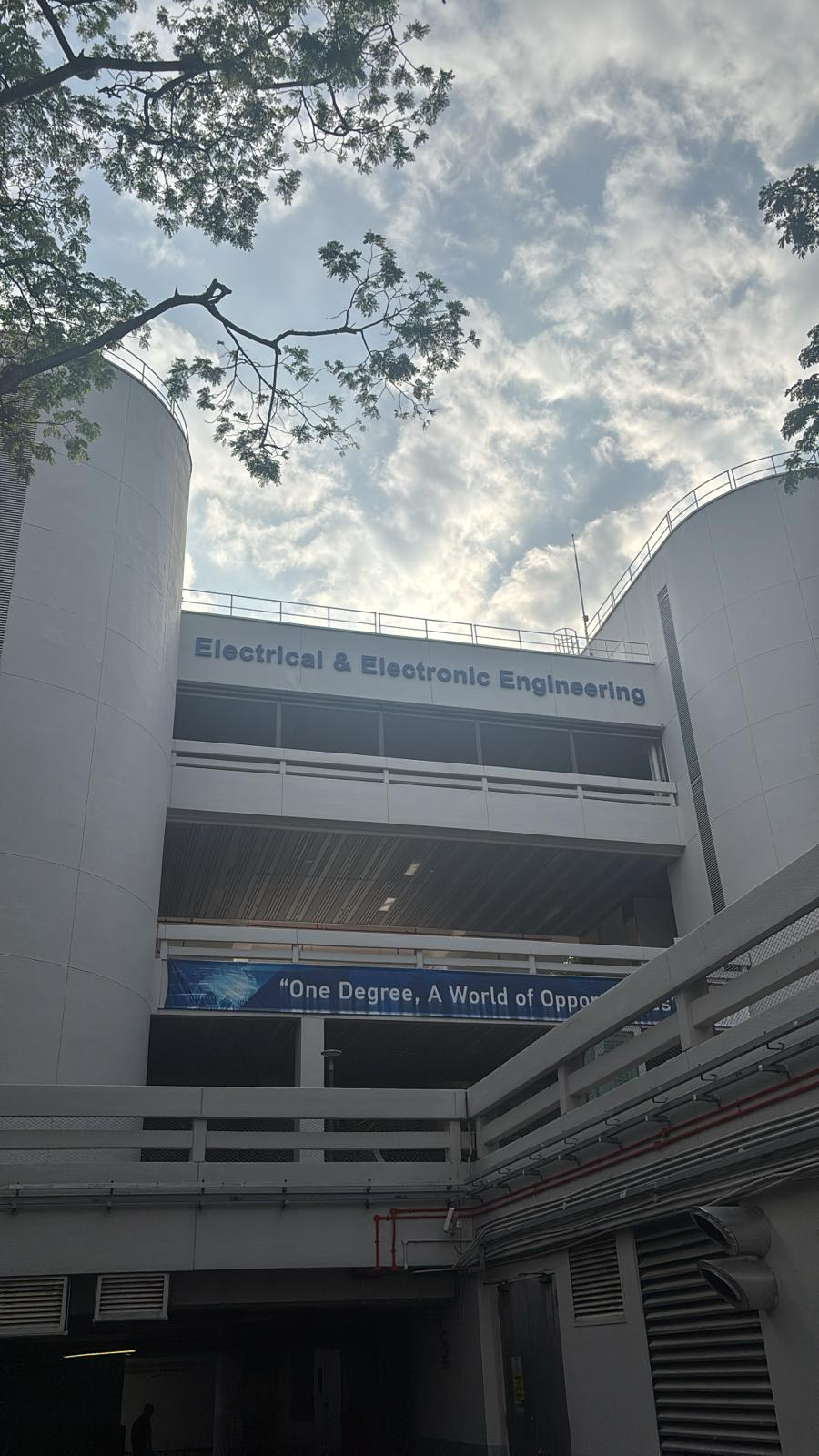
School of Electrical and Electronic Engineering (EEE)

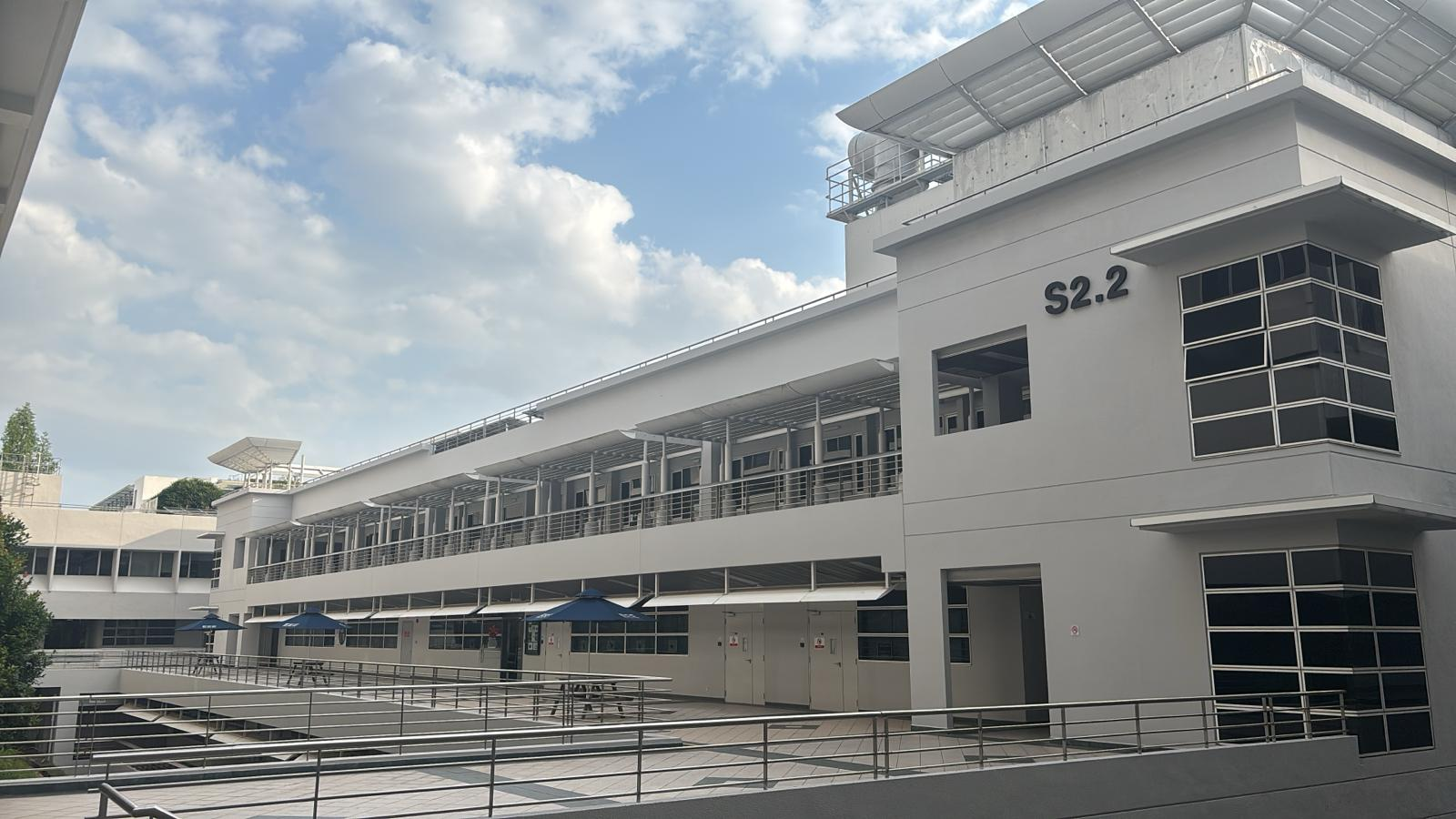
School of Electrical and Electronic Engineering complex

=== College of Computing and Data Science ===
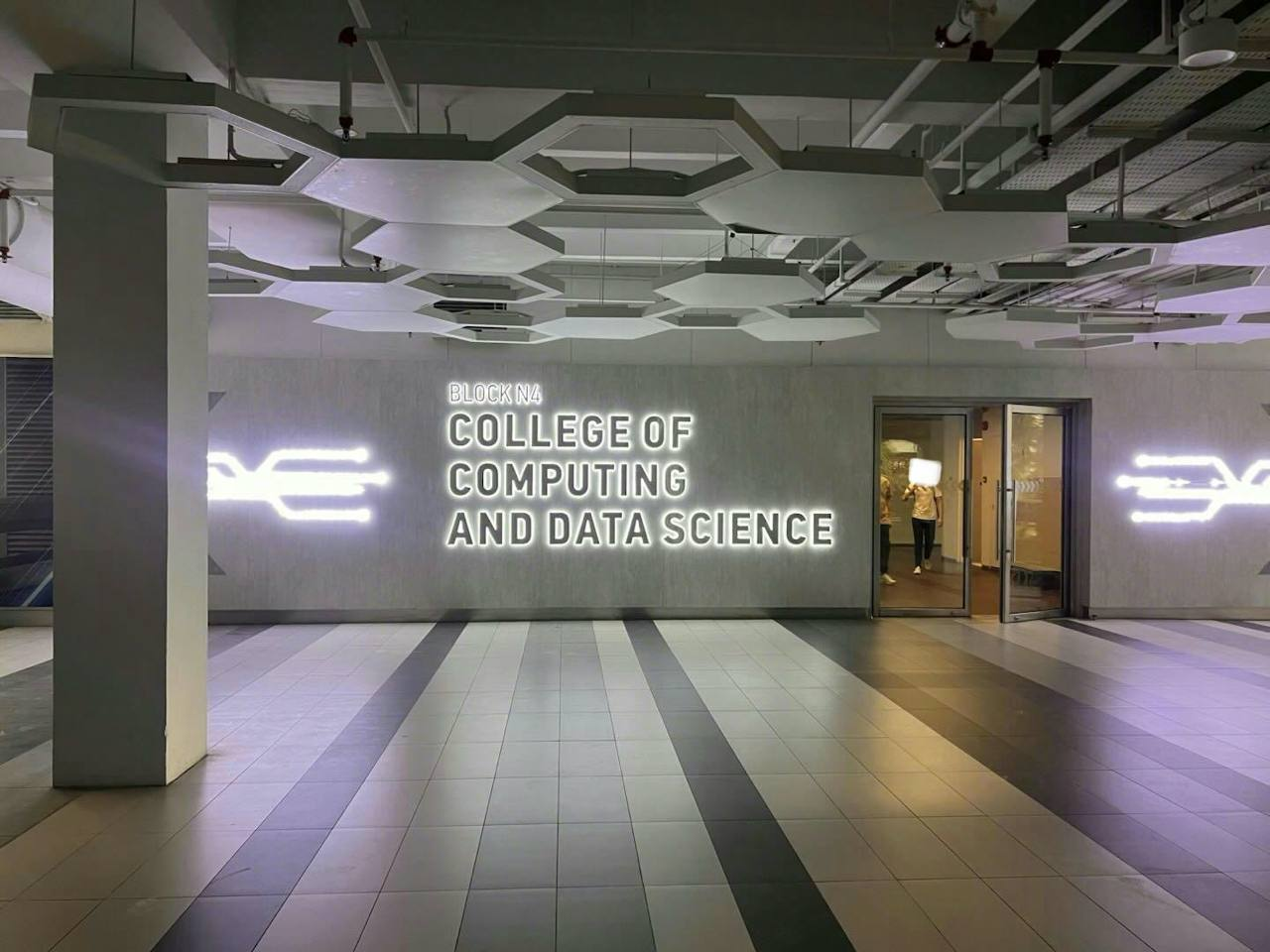
College of Computing and Data Science

The College of Computing and Data Science (CCDS) was established in February 2024 following a restructuring of the university’s academic framework. It was formed through the reorganisation of the School of Computer Science and Engineering and the consolidation of computing-related disciplines previously housed under the College of Engineering.

CCDS supports active research activities across a broad spectrum of computing and data science domains. It hosts research laboratories and centres such as the Generative AI Lab, Health Informatics Lab, Cyber Security Lab, Data Management and Analytics Lab, and the Centre for Brain-Computing Research, among others.

=== College of Science ===
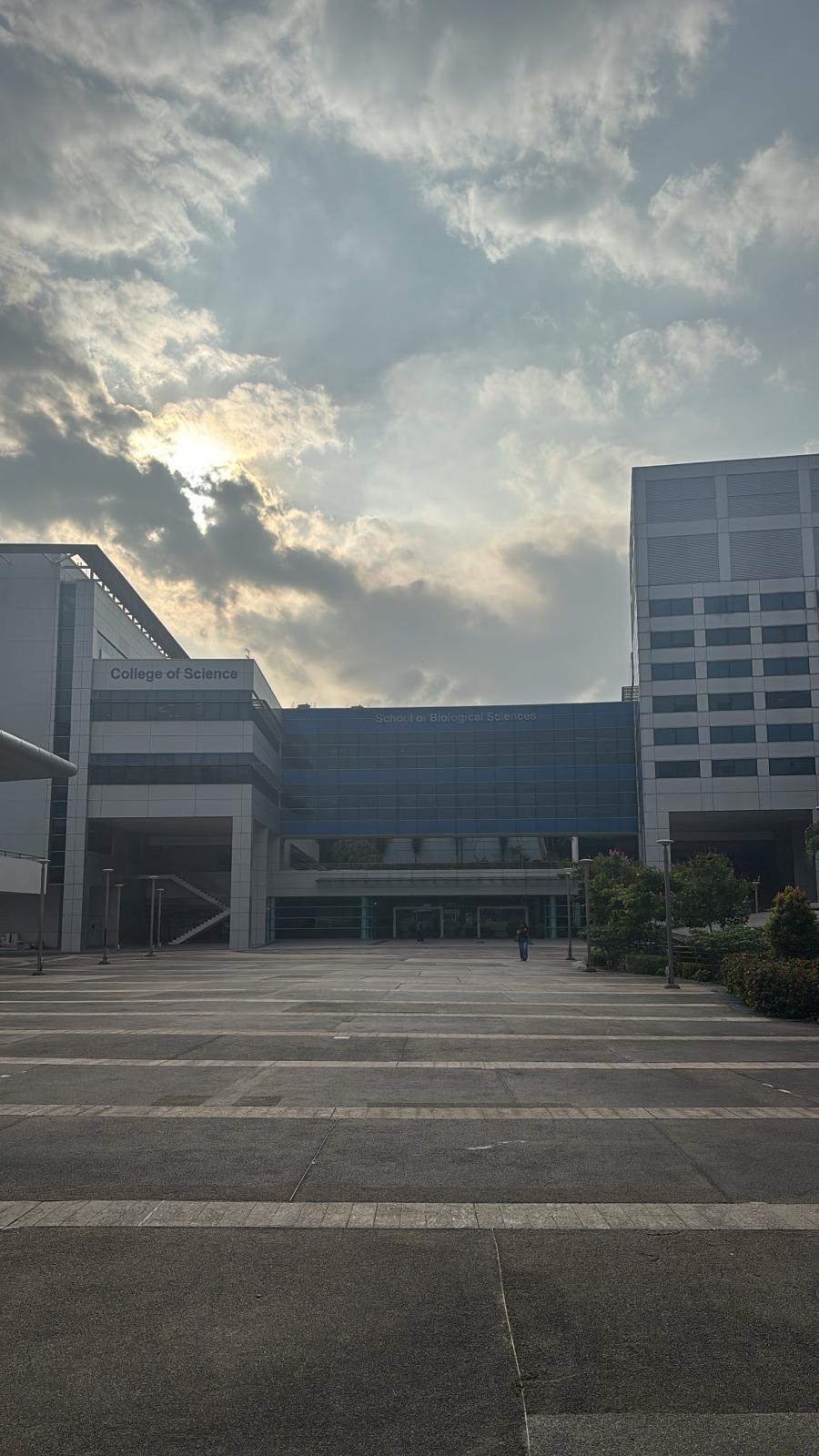
School of Biological Sciences

As of 2024, the college consists of four schools and is home to 257 faculty members, 578 research staff, 134 administrative and technical staff, 4,227 undergraduate and 1,078 graduate students.

- The School of Biological Sciences was established in 2002 and offers a variety of programmes in the Biological Sciences and double degree programme in Biomedical Sciences and Traditional Chinese Medicine with the Beijing University of Chinese Medicine in China.
- The School of Physical and Mathematical Sciences was established in 2005 and offers various disciplines in physics, applied physics and mathematical sciences. The school offers data science programmes together with the College of Computing and Data Science.
- The Asian School of the Environment is a new interdisciplinary School established in 2015 to focus on Asian environmental challenges, integrating Earth systems, environmental life sciences, ecology, and the social sciences to address key issues of the environment and sustainability.
- The School of Chemistry, Chemical Engineering and Biotechnology is a school run in conjunction with the College of Engineering established in 2022 with programmes in organic and inorganic chemistry, physical chemistry, chemical engineering, and bioengineering.

=== Graduate College ===
NTU's Graduate College was formed on 1 August 2018 and is in charge of graduate programmes in NTU. One such graduate programme is the Interdisciplinary Graduate Programme (IGP), which leverages on professors from multiple schools or colleges in NTU to undertake interdisciplinary research and to act as advisors for IGP PhD students. Another graduate programme is the Industrial Postgraduate Programme (IPP), which leverages on partnering industry companies to undertake industrial research and to act as advisors for IPP PhD students.

=== National Institute of Education ===
NIE Administration Building

Walkway beside NIE Block 3

The National Institute of Education (NIE), occupying 16 hectares (0.16 km^{2}; 40 acres) in the western part of NTU's Yunnan Garden campus, is Singapore's main teaching college and is run in close collaboration with Singapore's Ministry of Education. Full-time teachers in Singapore's public schools are required to complete a post-graduate diploma course at NIE, sponsored by Singapore's Ministry of Education.

NIE traces its origins to the Teachers' Training College (TTC), which began classes on 1 March 1950 in the former Anglo-Chinese School premises at Cairnhill. It was Singapore's first permanent full-time training college for English-medium teachers, and later added courses for teachers in the Chinese, Malay and Tamil streams. The TTC was replaced by the Institute of Education (IE) in 1973, and the IE moved to a campus in Bukit Timah in 1981. The College of Physical Education was set up at the Bukit Timah campus in July 1984 to train specialist physical education teachers. On 1 July 1991, the IE and the College of Physical Education merged to form NIE as part of the newly inaugurated NTU. NIE moved to a purpose-built S$400 million campus at Yunnan Garden in December 2000, and marked its 75th anniversary in 2025.

In the 2026–27 academic year, NIE had 632 undergraduates, 1,163 coursework postgraduates and 155 research postgraduates, as well as 821 students in graduate diploma programmes. The NIE Library, founded in 1950, is the largest education library in Singapore. NTU was ranked 8th in the world for education in the 2026 QS World University Rankings by Subject.

== Academics ==
NTU is a comprehensive national public research university with most students enrolled in full-time undergraduate and graduate degree programmes.

It operates on a two-semester academic calendar, with the academic year typically running from August to May and an optional special term in between semesters.

=== Undergraduate program ===
Enrolment at NTU (2023–2026)
Academic Year	Undergraduates	Graduate	Total Enrollment
2023–2024	24,757	10,608	35,365
2024–2025	24,800	12,658	37,458
2025–2026	25,010	15,729	40,739
2026–2027	25,463	17,963	43,426
Source: NTU Institutional Statistics Unit

As of 2026, NTU enrolls over 25,000 undergraduate students across its colleges and schools. The College of Engineering constitutes the largest academic division, followed by the College of Humanities, Arts and Social Sciences, College of Computing & Data Science, Nanyang Business School, College of Science, Lee Kong Chian School of Medicine and the National institute of Education.

From the cohort entering in August 2021, undergraduates (with limited exceptions such as medical students) take a university-wide Interdisciplinary Collaborative Core (ICC) curriculum covering topics such as digital literacy, communication and inquiry, ethics and global challenges. The core courses make up about one-fifth of the academic workload and replaced the earlier general education requirements. Internships also became a graduation requirement for all undergraduates from the 2021 cohort.

Most undergraduate courses combine lectures, tutorials, laboratory sessions and project-based assessments. Final-year students typically complete a capstone project or final-year project particularly in engineering and science programs, involving independent research or applied design under faculty supervision, industry partners or research institutes.

=== Undergraduate Research ===
NTU places emphasis on undergraduate research, with students participating in faculty led projects through programmes such as the Undergraduate Research Experience on Campus (URECA) and overseas research attachments. Many undergraduates also engage in internships, industry-linked projects and/or overseas exchange programmes as part of their degree requirements.

=== Graduate program ===
NTU offers a broad range of graduate programmes, including coursework-based and research-based master's degrees, as well as Doctor of Philosophy (PhD) programmes across science, engineering, computing, medicine, education, business and the humanities.

Doctoral education at NTU is research-intensive, with PhD candidates typically supported through scholarships, research assistantships or teaching assistantships. Graduate students are closely integrated into NTU's research ecosystem, which allows them to contribute to national and international research initiatives.

NTU also offers professional graduate degrees, including the Master of Business Administration (MBA), specialized master's programmes in engineering and computing and joint or dual-degree programmes with international partner universities. The university also maintains over 50 joint, dual, and double-degree programmes with international partner institutions, particularly in Europe, North America, and Asia.

=== Honours education ===
The NTU Honours College was established to provide an interdisciplinary, cohort-based honours education for high-performing undergraduates across the university. The programme admits students from multiple colleges and schools, with its first intake of approximately 500 students in August 2025.

=== Scholarships ===
NTU is a participating institution in the Singapore International Graduate Award (SINGA), a national doctoral scholarship programme administered by the Agency for Science, Technology & Research (A*STAR). This programme supports PhD candidates worldwide and is jointly offered by A*STAR, Nanyang Technological University, the National University of Singapore, and the Singapore University of Technology and Design.

=== Awards ===
NTU confers the Nanyang Research Award annually to recognise research achievements by its faculty. The award is presented as part of the Nanyang Awards, which also include awards for education and innovation.

=== Collaborations ===
NTU maintains extensive global academic and industry partnerships to advance research, education, and innovation. Key collaborations include the CREATE campus with research centres alongside MIT, ETH Zurich, Technical University of Munich, Cambridge University, and others in areas like electromobility, sustainability, and AI.

Notable joint initiatives feature the Centre for Lifelong Learning and Individualised Cognition (CLIC) with University of Cambridge, seed funds with Imperial College London for blue-sky research in health, AI, and urban resilience, and the Fraunhofer-NTU Research Centre.

Industry ties span over 700 companies via corporate labs and NTUitive spin-offs (e.g., Nanofilm, Eureka Robotics), plus partnerships with P&G, Schaeffler, and the Millennium Technology Prize as Asia's first academic partner.

=== Research profile ===
Postgraduates made up 41.4% of NTU's 43,426 degree students in the 2026–27 academic year. Of these, 3,777 were research students (8.7% of all degree students), most of them in the College of Engineering (1,412), the College of Computing and Data Science (655) and the College of Science (648).

NTU's competitive research funding comes from sources including the Ministry of Education's Academic Research Fund and the National Research Foundation's Competitive Research Programme. According to the university, it received about S$7.9 billion in competitive funding between 2005 and 2021 and S$644.1 million in the 2021–22 financial year, and about S$730 million in the 2024 financial year, when it also filed 670 patents. It hosts more than 45 corporate and joint laboratories.

In the Nature Index 2026 Research Leaders tables, which cover articles published in 2025, NTU had 1,002 articles and a Share of 307.05, up 13.8% from 269.93 in 2024. Among academic institutions in Singapore it ranked second, behind the National University of Singapore (412.22). Thirty-three NTU researchers were named in Clarivate's 2025 Highly Cited Researchers list, and NTU was ranked fifth in the Times Higher Education Interdisciplinary Science Rankings published in November 2025, up from ninth a year earlier.

=== Research institutes and centres ===
NTU hosts several national-level research entities, including Research Centres of Excellence (RCEs) and University-level Research Institutes. The university also hosts the Singapore AI Safety Institute, formerly known as the Digital Trust Centre until its rebrand on 22 May 2024.

==== Research Centres of Excellence ====
As of 2026, NTU hosts 2 Research Centres of Excellence.

- The Institute for Digital Molecular Analytics and Science (IDMxS) is an interdisciplinary RCE supported by the Ministry of Education, Nanyang Technological University, and the National University of Singapore, with research spanning molecular analytics, data science, and engineering.
- The Singapore Centre on Environmental Life Sciences Engineering (SCELSE) is an interdisciplinary RCE, funded by National Research Foundation, Singapore Ministry of Education, Nanyang Technological University and National University of Singapore. Hosted by the NTU in partnership with NUS, SCELSE is linking new insights from the Life Sciences with expertise from the emerging technologies in Engineering and Natural Sciences to understand, harness and control microbial biofilm communities. The union of these fields has established a new discipline of Environmental Life Sciences Engineering.

==== University-level Research Institutes ====
NTU hosts several University-level Research Institutes that support interdisciplinary and applied research aligned with national priorities:

- The Nanyang Environment & Water Research Institute (NEWRI) focuses on sustainability-related research, including water technologies, environmental engineering, and urban solutions.
- The Energy Research Institute @ NTU (ERI@N) conducts research on sustainable energy systems, clean energy technologies, and energy policy, serving as a platform for collaboration between academia, industry, and government.

The Earth Observatory of Singapore (EOS), which was previously established as a Research Centre of Excellence, transitioned to a University-level Research Institute in July 2023. EOS specializes in Earth Sciences and conducts fundamental research on earthquakes, volcanoes, tsunamis & climate change in and around Southeast Asia, towards safer and more sustainable societies.

=== Libraries ===
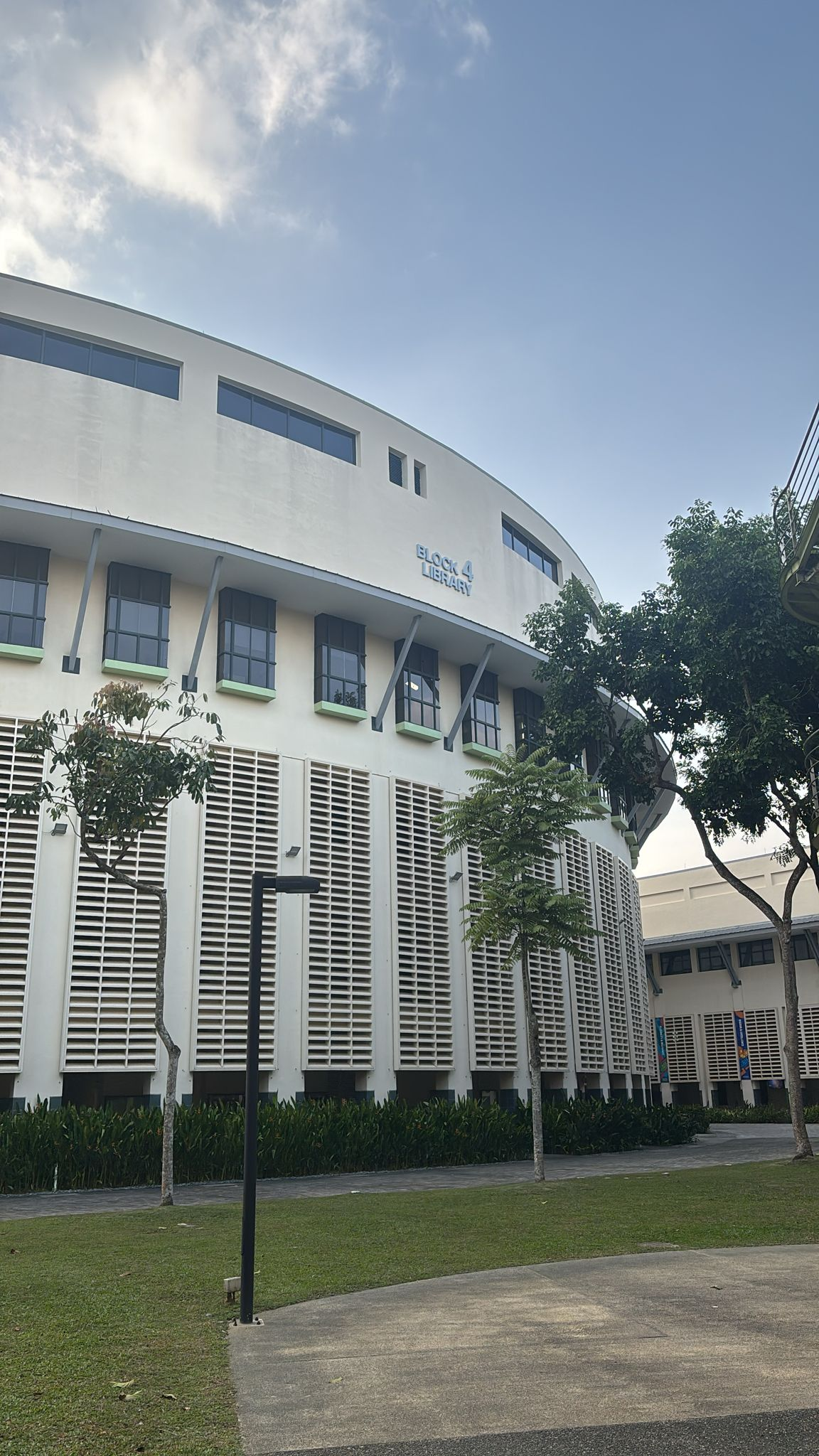
NIE library

NTU operates a network of 8 libraries:

- Business Library
- Chinese Library
- Humanities & Social Sciences Library
- Lee Wee Nam Library
- Library Outpost
- Art, Design & Media Library
- Communication & Information Library
- Library and Information Services Centre (NIE)

They collectively house over two million print, digital, and audiovisual resources accessible 24/7 online for staff and students.

The Lee Wee Nam Library supports engineering and science collections with study spaces including wellness areas like the 'Hygge'. Other key branches include the Business Library (finance and marketing), Chinese Library (Chinese literature and history), Humanities & Social Sciences Library (Singapore studies and research), Communication & Information Library (media and communication studies), and Art, Design & Media Library (visual and audiovisual materials).

Additional facilities include the Wang Gungwu Library at the Chinese Heritage Centre, which focuses on the history of overseas Chinese, and the Medical Library at Novena.

=== Research network and computing ===
NTU is a founding member of the Singapore Advanced Research and Education Network (SingAREN). In 2014, SingAREN, the Agency for Science, Technology and Research (A*STAR), NTU and the National University of Singapore launched the SingAREN-Lightwave Internet Exchange (SLIX), funded by the National Research Foundation and described by SingAREN as the first 100 Gbit/s research and education network in Southeast Asia. International links at 100 Gbit/s to Japan and Europe were added later.

The campus network connects to the Internet as autonomous system AS9419. As of November 2026, Hurricane Electric's routing data showed it announcing four IPv4 prefixes covering 65,536 addresses and one IPv6 prefix, with SingAREN and the commercial carriers SingNet and StarHub among its adjacent networks.

In 2015, NTU, A*STAR, the National University of Singapore and the Singapore University of Technology and Design pooled resources to establish the National Supercomputing Centre (NSCC), a shared national facility for high-performance computing.

== Student Life ==
=== Student governance and organizations ===
Student life at NTU is largely self-directed. The Nanyang Technological University Students’ Union (NTUSU) is the main representative body for undergraduates. Membership in NTUSU is compulsory for all full-time undergrads (and certain postgraduates in NIE).

The Union consists of 16 academic constituent clubs (one for each school or college) and 3 non-academic constituent clubs – namely the Cultural Activities Club, Sports Club, and Welfare Services Club.

Through its elected Council and Executive Committee, NTUSU organizes student activities and serves as the liaison between the student body and the university administration. In addition, a Graduate Students’ Association represents postgraduate students.

=== Clubs and societies ===
Beyond the Union’s constituent clubs, NTU has numerous special interest groups and societies. Students can join over 100 clubs spanning arts, culture, sports, entrepreneurship and community service and more. Competitive teams (like cheer, sports and recreational games) also represent NTU in inter-varsity competitions.

=== Residential Life ===
NTU has 23 Halls of Residence for undergraduates, each accommodating between 500 and 659 residents. All halls are co-educational by floor or wing and offer both single and double occupancy rooms, with double rooms shared by residents of the same gender. Communal facilities are available in every hall and typically include lounges, air-conditioned reading rooms, pantries, and laundry rooms equipped with washing machines and dryers.

Each hall is managed by a student-run Hall Council. About 12,000 students live on campus, and every incoming freshman is guaranteed two years of hall accommodation. Hall councils organise inter-hall competitions, orientation activities and student welfare initiatives.

Senior students typically accrue “hall points” by participating in hall activities and committees to qualify for continued residency. Hall Councils also organize social events, welfare initiatives, and orientation activities for residents.

On-campus housing

Hall of Residence 4

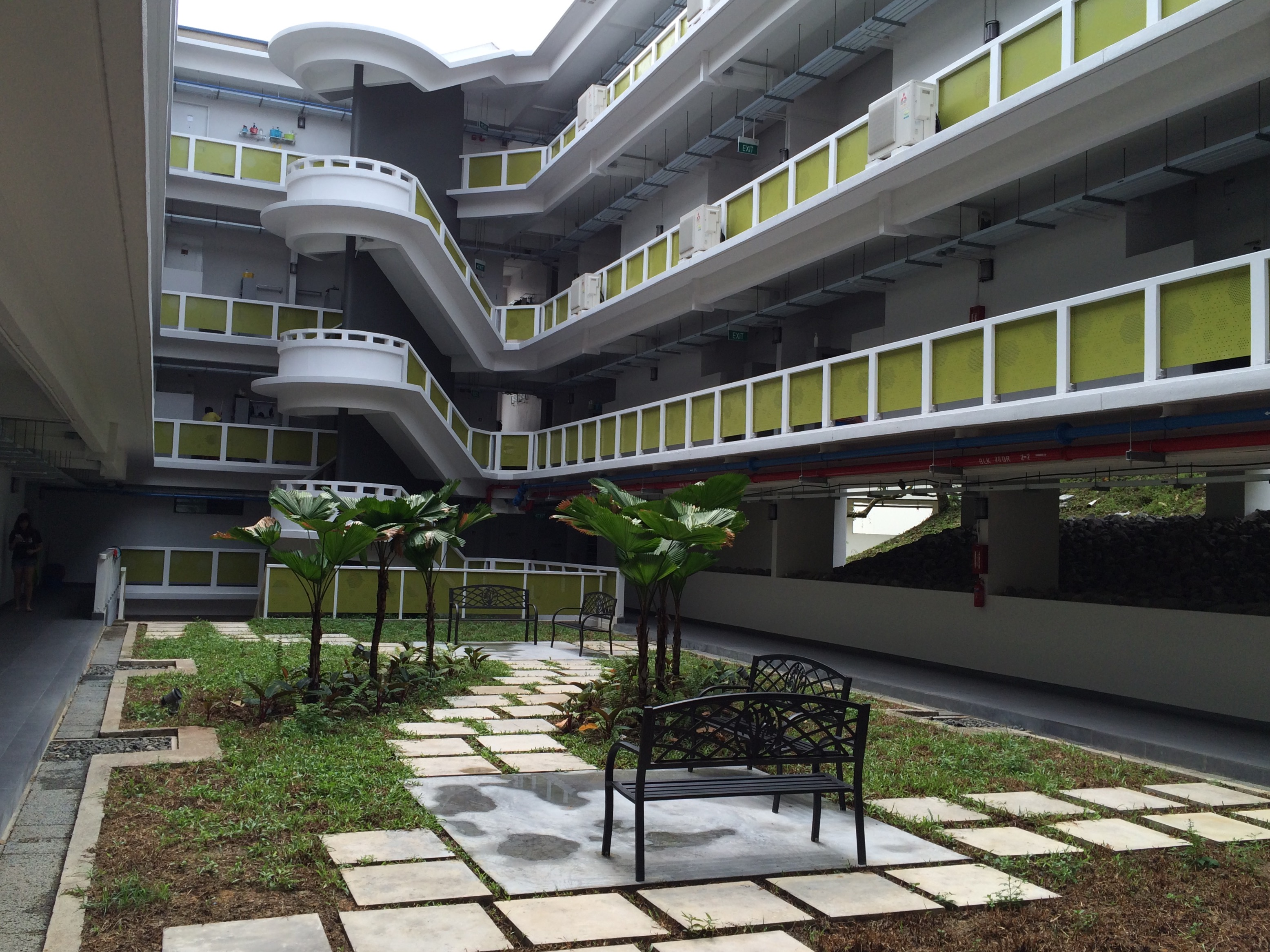
Hall of Residence 5

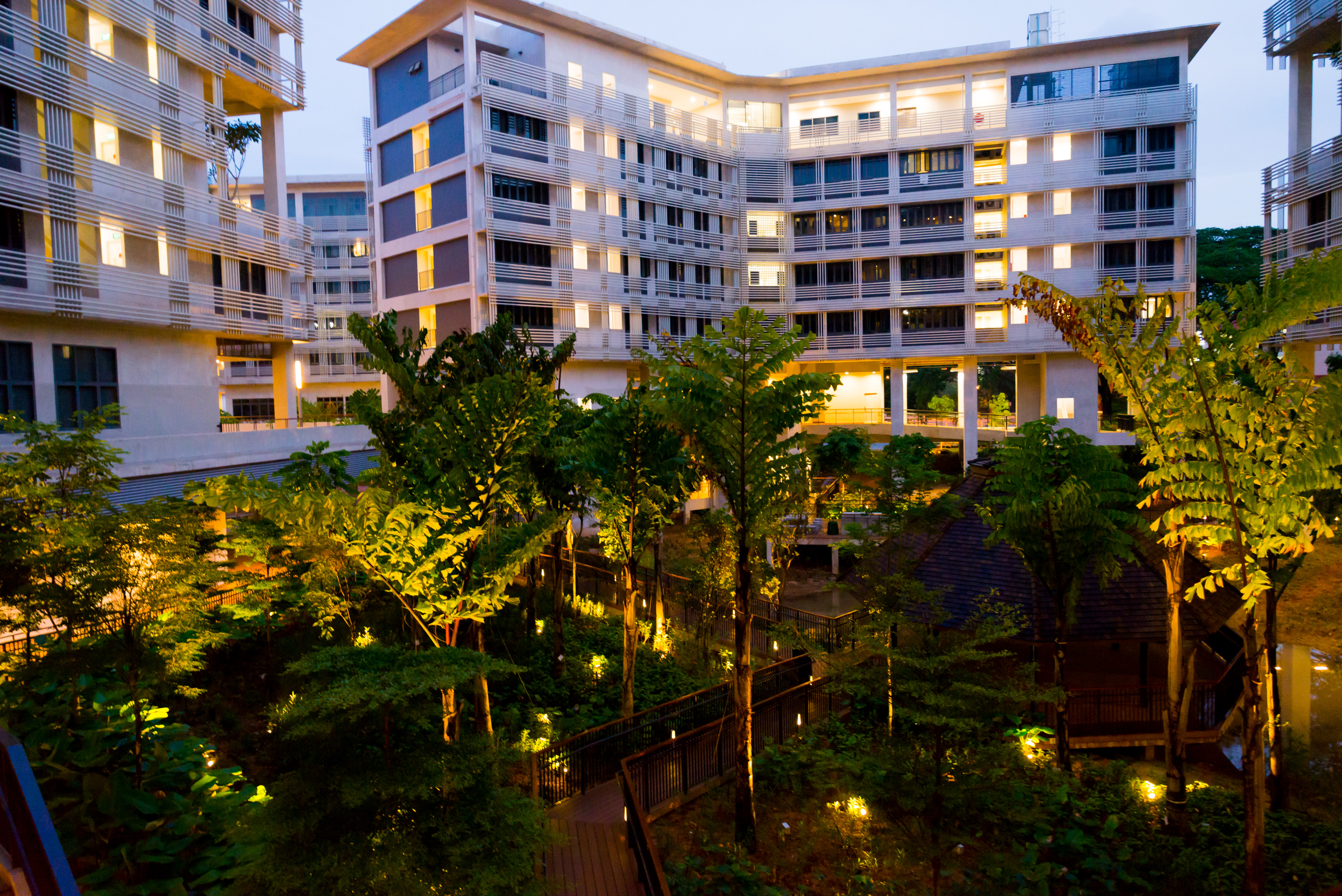
Student accommodation

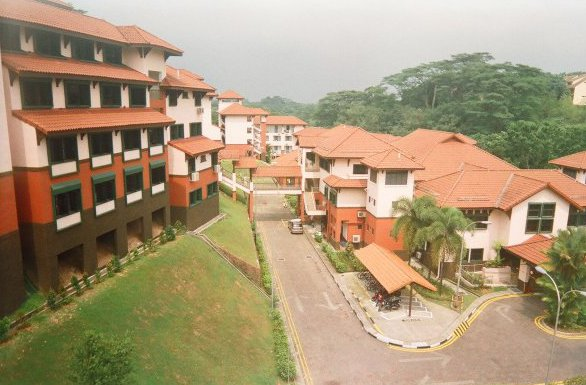
Hall of Residence 9

=== Transportation ===
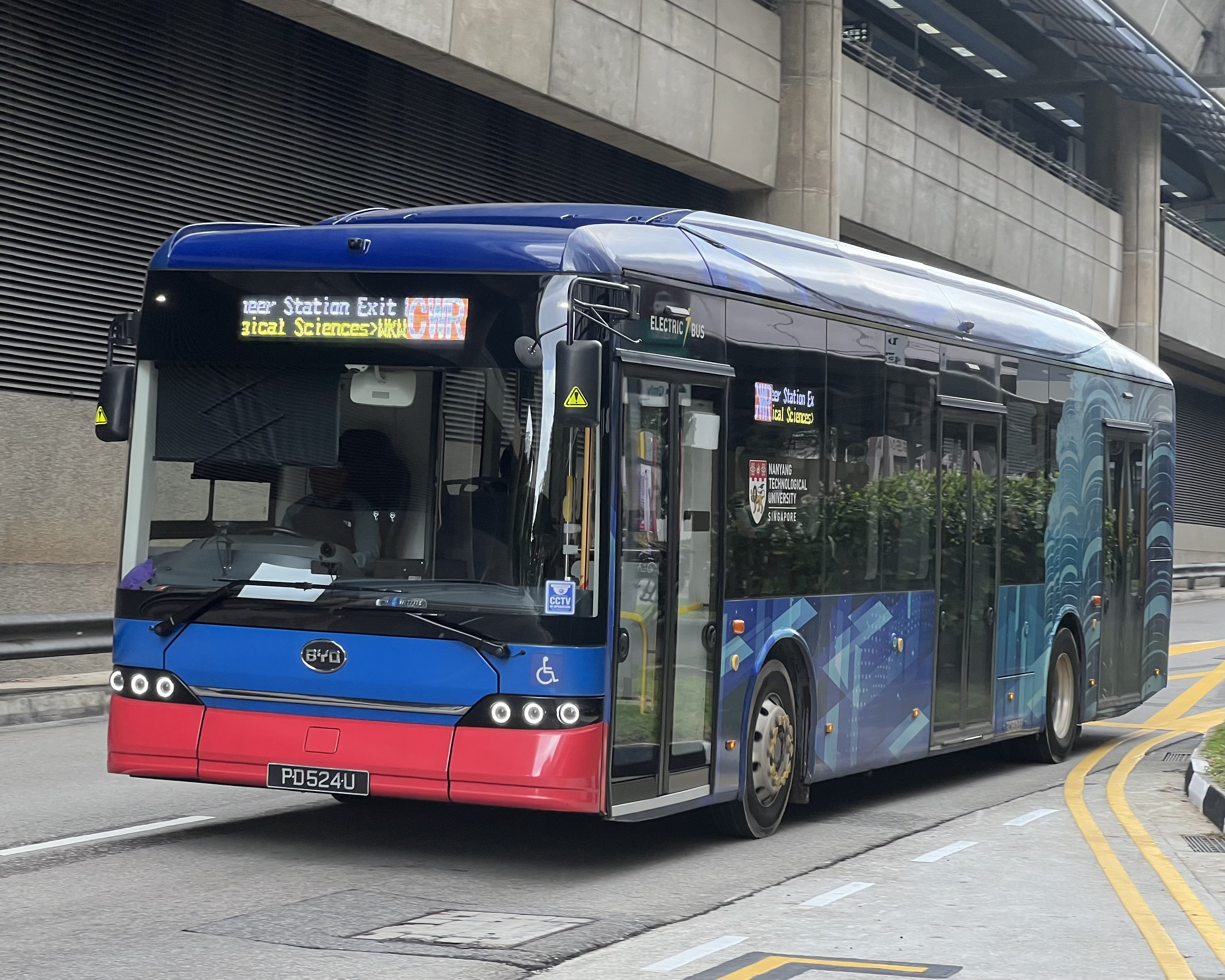
NTU shuttle bus operating the Campus Weekend Rider

Transportation to and around NTU is provided by means of campus shuttle buses. The Campus Loop Red and Blue services circle the campus, while the Campus Rider service connects the campus to the Pioneer MRT station.

NTU is planned to be served directly by 3 new MRT stations on the Jurong Region Line, which is expected to open around 2029: JW3 (Nanyang Gateway), JW4 (Nanyang Crescent) and JW5 (Peng Kang Hill). Construction is ongoing on campus, with worksites along Nanyang Avenue and Nanyang Drive.

== Entrepreneurship ==
NTU's entrepreneurship ecosystem is anchored by NTUitive, the university's innovation and enterprise company and wholly-owned subsidiary, which manages intellectual property, promotes innovation, supports entrepreneurship, and facilitates the commercialization of research through technology licensing, start-up incubation, and industry partnerships.

The Overseas Entrepreneurship Programme (OEP) offers selected undergraduates with funded overseas internships of 6–12 months at technology start-ups in established innovation hubs such as Silicon Valley, Shenzhen, and Tel Aviv. The programme includes entrepreneurship-related coursework and requires participants to complete prescribed modules prior to departure. OEP operates under Singapore’s Global Innovation Alliance framework.

Entrepreneurship initiatives at NTU are further coordinated through the NTU Entrepreneurship Academy (NTUpreneur), which supports student-led ventures via incubator spaces, seed funding schemes, innovation challenges, and mentorship programmes. As of the mid-2020s, NTU spin-off companies have collectively licensed over 1,000 technologies, with reported combined valuations exceeding S$800 million.

== Reputation and rankings ==
University rankings

Global – Overall
- ARWU World: 84 (2026)
- QS World: 12 (2027)
- THE World: 28 (2027)
- USNWR Global: 27 (2026–2027)

Regional – Overall
- QS Asia: 3 (2025)
- THE Asia: 4 (2026)
- USNWR Asia: 4 (2026)

=== Overall rankings ===
NTU was #40 worldwide in 2024 in terms of aggregate performance across THE, QS, and ARWU. In 2026, NTU retained its 12th spot in the 2027 QS World University Ranking, published on June 18, 2026.

=== Young university rankings ===
NTU is #1 in both the Times Higher Education Young University Rankings 2023 and the QS "Top 50 Under 50" 2021. NTU has been ranked as the world's #1 young university by QS since 2015.

=== Subject/area rankings ===
In the QS World University Rankings by Subject published in March 2026, 44 of NTU's subjects were ranked, 38 of them in the global top 50. Eleven subjects were placed in the global top 10: Communication and Media Studies (2nd), Materials Science (3rd), Data Science and Artificial Intelligence (4th), Electrical and Electronic Engineering (4th), Library and Information Management (5th), Mechanical, Aeronautical and Manufacturing Engineering (5th), Chemical Engineering (6th), Civil and Structural Engineering (6th), Chemistry (8th), Education (8th), and Computer Science and Information Systems (9th). By broad subject area, NTU was ranked 10th for Engineering and Technology, 18th for Natural Sciences, 21st for Social Sciences and Management, and 40th for Arts and Humanities. In ShanghaiRanking's 2026 Global Ranking of Academic Subjects, NTU was ranked first in the world for artificial intelligence and second for automation and control. Nanyang Business School's MBA programme was ranked 12th in the Financial Times Global MBA Ranking 2026.

== Notable alumni ==
Nanyang Technological University (NTU) has produced alumni who have held high office in government across Southeast Asia, led multinational corporations, and achieved distinction in academia, arts, sports and media.

=== Politics, government and public service ===
==== International ====
- HE Pehin Dato Abu Bakar Apong – Former Minister of Home Affairs of Brunei
- Major Agus Harimurti Yudhoyono – Coordinating Minister for Infrastructure and Regional Development, Indonesia
- Edhie Baskoro Yudhoyono – Member of House of Representatives, Indonesia
- Lan Tianli – Former chairman and deputy party chief of the Guangxi Zhuang Autonomous Region, China and chairman of the Guangxi Zhuang Autonomous Region Committee of the Chinese People's Political Consultative Conference
- Dato' Seri Mohd Zuki Bin Ali – Board Chairman, Employees Provident Fund, Malaysia
- Gen. Tito Karnavian – Minister of Home Affairs, Indonesia; former chief of the Indonesian National Police
- Nie Chenxi – Standing Committee Member, Deputy Director, 14th National Committee of the Chinese People's Political Consultative Conference, People's Republic of China
- Y.B. Datuk Seri Ir Wee Ka Siong – President of Malaysian Chinese Association; Member, House of Representative of Malaysia

==== Current Ministers and Members of Parliament (MP) ====
- Ang Wei Neng – Member of Parliament for West Coast GRC
- Baey Yam Keng – Senior Parliamentary Secretary, Ministry of Sustainability and the Environment & Ministry of Transport
- Cheryl Chan – Member of Parliament for East Coast GRC
- Chong Kee Hiong – Member of Parliament for Bishan-Toa Payoh GRC
- Eric Chua – Senior Parliamentary Secretary, Ministry of Culture, Community and Youth & Ministry of Social and Family Development
- Darryl David – Member of Parliament for Ang Mo Kio GRC
- Gerald Giam Yean Song – Member of Parliament for Aljunied GRC
- Derrick Goh – Member of Parliament for Nee Soon GRC
- Low Yen Ling – Senior Minister of State, Ministry of Culture, Community and Youth & Ministry of Trade and Industry; Chairperson of Mayors' Committee & Mayor, South West District; Member of Parliament for Chua Chu Kang GRC
- Masagos Zulkifli – Minister for Social and Family Development & Second Minister for Health; Minister-in-charge of Muslim Affairs; Member of Parliament for Tampines GRC
- Ng Ling Ling – Member of Parliament for Ang Mo Kio GRC, 2018 Her World Woman of the Year
- Sim Ann – Senior Minister of State, Ministry of Foreign Affairs & Ministry of National Development; Member of Parliament for Holland-Bukit Timah GRC
- Desmond Tan Kok Ming – Senior Minister of State, Singapore Prime Minister's Office; Member of Parliament for Pasir Ris-Punggol GRC
- Wan Rizal Wan Zakariah – Member of Parliament for Jalan Besar GRC
- Don Wee – Member of Parliament for Chua Chu Kang GRC
- Yip Hon Weng – Member of Parliament for Yio Chu Kang SMC
- Melvin Yong – Member of Parliament for Radin Mas SMC, and Assistant Secretary General National Trades Union Congress
- Zaqy Mohamad – Senior Minister of State, Ministry of Defence & Ministry of Manpower; Member of Parliament for Marsiling-Yew Tee GRC
- Patrick Tay – Member of Parliament for Pioneer SMC and Assistant Secretary General of National Trades Union Congress

==== Retired politicians ====
- Ang Mong Seng – former Member of Parliament for Bukit Gombak SMC
- Cheo Chai Chen – former Member of Parliament for Nee Soon Central SMC
- Inderjit Singh – former Member of Parliament for Ang Mo Kio GRC
- Intan Azura Mokhtar – former Member of Parliament for Ang Mo Kio GRC
- Lee Bee Wah – former Member of Parliament for Nee Soon GRC
- Sinnakaruppan s/o C Ramasamy – former Member of Parliament, and first Students' Union President
- Low Thia Khiang – Former Secretary-General of Workers' Party; Former Member of Parliament (Singapore)
- Sebastian Teo Kway Huang – former President of the National Solidarity Party
- Teo Ser Luck – former Member of Parliament for Pasir Ris-Punggol GRC, Mayor, and Minister of State; President, Institute of Singapore Chartered Accountants
- Yee Jenn Jong – former Non-Constituency Member of Parliament
- Yu-Foo Yee Shoon – former Member of Parliament for Yuhua SMC, and former Minister of State for Community Development, Youth & Sports

=== Business ===
- Ajit Mohan – Chief Business Officer, Snap Inc.
- Dato’ Sri Tahir – Founder, Mayapada Group; billionaire
- Danny Yong – Chief Investment Officer & Founding Partner, Dymon Asia Capital
- Tan Chin Hwee – Chairman, SGTraDex Services; Asia-Pacific CEO, Trafigura
- Tan Lip-Bu – CEO of Intel; Chairman, Walden International; former CEO, Cadence Design Systems
- Merry Riana – Founder, Merry Riana Group

=== Science ===
- Shirley Meng – Professor, Pritzker School of Molecular Engineering, University of Chicago
- Ming Joo Koh – Associate Professor, NUS Singapore; Young Scientist Award 2022

=== Educators, artists and literary figures ===
- Choo Jing Sarah – Gold Award in the 2016 PX3 Prix de la Photographie, Fine Art Category; First Place in the 2015 Moscow International Foto Awards
- Liang Wern Fook – writer and musician; Cultural Medallion for Music 2010
- Ng Yew Kwang – economist
- Nuraliah Bte Norasid – Epigram Books Fiction Prize 2016 for her first novel, The Gatekeeper
- Tan Swie Hian – local artist & sculptor; Cultural Medallion for Art 1987
- Wong Meng Voon – writer and co-founder, Singapore Association of Writers; Cultural Medallion for Literature 1981
- You Jin – author; Cultural Medallion for Literary Arts 2009

=== Media professionals and celebrities ===
- Vincy Chan – Singer
- Priyadarshini - Playback singer
- Annette Lee – Filmmaker, actress, musician
- Lee Teng – Television presenter
- Lin Youyi – Newscaster and corporate trainer
- Michelle Alicia Saram – Actress
- Joanne Peh – Actress, filmmaker and compere
- Rui En – Actress, singer and compere
- Diana Ser – Presenter and TV journalist
- Stefanie Sun – Singer and Songwriter
- Zhang Haijie – Television presenter and producer

=== Sports Medallists ===
- Dipna Lim Prasad – Silver and bronze medallist in sprinting at the SEA Games (2013 to 2017)
- Leslie Kwok – Bronze medallist in swimming at the SEA Games (1997 - 2005)
- Lee Wung Yew – Multiple medallist in trap shooting at SEA Games (1985 - 2009)
- Tan Cheng Yin Esther – First female naval diver and endurance sports specialist; Singapore Women's Hall of Fame
- Wong Wei Long – Bronze medallist in basketball at the SEA Games (2013-2015); Gold medallist at SEABA Cup, 2014
- Yu Mengyu – Gold medallist in table-tennis at the World Championship, Commonwealth Games, SEA Games (2007 - 2022)

=== Community builders ===
- John Chew – Former 8th Bishop of Singapore

== Notable faculty ==
=== Medicine, science and engineering ===
- Chen Xiaodong – Materials Science and Engineering
- Ernst Kuipers – Gastroenterology
- Joseph Sung – Gastroenterology and Hepatology
- Simon Redfern – Mineralogy and Geosciences
- Warren Chan – Nanotechnology and Biomedical Engineering
- Louis Phee – medical robotics

=== Business and technology ===
- Teck-Hua Ho – Behavioral Science, Marketing and Operations Management
- Vijay Sethi – First Economist Intelligence Unit Business Professor of the Year

=== Humanities and social sciences ===
- Duncan McCargo – Political Science
