= Phee =

The name Phee is of Scottish or Chinese origin. Notable people with the surname include:

== Given name ==
- Phee Bay (born 15 December 2005) Myanmar footballer
- Phee Boon Poh (born 1 December 1951) Malaysian politician In Panang State Executive Council
- Phee Jinq En (Born 29 November 1997) Malaysian professional swimmer
- Phee Syn Tze (Born 7 February 1985) Malaysian politician

== Surname ==
- Chan Mah Phee (Born 1800's) Chinese businessman
- Louis Phee Singaporean engineer, academic and entrepreneur
- Mary Catherine Phee (Born 1963) American diplomat
