= Shuming Nie =

Chinese-American chemist

- Education: Nankai University; Northwestern University
- Known for: Quantum dots Surface-enhanced Raman spectroscopy
- Awards: Merck Award (2007); Elected Fellow of the American Institute of Biological and Medical Engineering (2006); Cheung Kong Professorship (The Ministry of Education of China, 2006) the Rank Prize in Opto-electronics (London, UK, 2005) the Georgia Distinguished Cancer Scholar Award (Georgia Cancer Coalition, 2002-2007) the Beckman Young Investigator Award the National Collegiate Inventors Award the NSFC Overseas Young Scholar Award
- Scientific career
- Fields: Biomedical Engineering, Nanotechnology
- Workplaces: Emory University
- Doctoral advisor: Richard P. van Duyne
- Other academic advisors: Richard Zare
- Doctoral students: Warren Chan

Shuming Nie (Chinese: 聂书明) is a Chinese-American chemist. He is the Grainger Distinguished Chair in Bioengineering at the University of Illinois at Urbana-Champaign. He was the Wallace H. Coulter Distinguished Faculty Chair in Biomedical Engineering at Emory University. In 2007, Nie was elected as a fellow of the American Institute for Medical and Biological Engineering (AIMBE). In 2012, Nie was elected as a fellow of the American Association for the Advancement of Science (AAAS).

He is a pioneer of single-molecular SERS. He is one of the pioneers of quantum dots for biomedical imaging.

== Recent publications ==
- Shuming Nie. "Remembering Dr. Richard P. Van Duyne (1945–2019): Gentleman, Scholar, and Surface-Enhanced Raman Scattering Pioneer". ACS Nano 2020, 14(1), 26-27. https://pubs.acs.org/doi/10.1021/acsnano.9b09759
- Wang, Jianquan; Lee, Gee Young; Lu, Qian; Peng, Xianghong; Wu, Jiangxiao; Wu, Siyuan; Kairdolf, Brad A.; Nie, Shuming; Wang, Yiqing; Lane, Lucas A. (3 May 2017). "Quantitative Examination of the Active Targeting Effect: The Key Factor for Maximal Tumor Accumulation and Retention of Short-Circulated Biopolymeric Nanocarriers". Bioconjugate Chemistry. 28 (5): 1351–1355. doi:10.1021/acs.bioconjchem.7b00138. PMID 28448116.
- Keating, Jane J.; Runge, Jeffrey J.; Singhal, Sunil; Nims, Sarah; Venegas, Ollin; Durham, Amy C.; Swain, Gary; Nie, Shuming; Low, Philip S.; Holt, David E. (15 May 2017). "Intraoperative near-infrared fluorescence imaging targeting folate receptors identifies lung cancer in a large-animal model". Cancer. 123 (6): 1051–1060. doi:10.1002/cncr.30419. PMC 5341137. PMID 28263385.
- Lee, John Y. K.; Pierce, John T.; Thawani, Jayesh P.; Zeh, Ryan; Nie, Shuming; Martinez-Lage, Maria; Singhal, Sunil (7 April 2017). "Near-infrared fluorescent image-guided surgery for intracranial meningioma". Journal of Neurosurgery. 128 (2): 380–390. doi:10.3171/2016.10.JNS161636. PMC 10985532. PMID 28387632.
- Warren C. W. Chan, Shuming Nie. Quantum Dot Bioconjugates for Ultrasensitive Nonisotopic Detection. Science 1998. 281(5385): 2016-2018.https://www.science.org/doi/10.1126/science.275.5303.1102
- Shuming Nie, Steven R. Emory. Probing Single Molecules and Single Nanoparticles by Surface-Enhanced Raman Scattering. Science 1997. 275(5303): 1102-1106. https://www.science.org/doi/10.1126/science.275.5303.1102

== See also ==
- Surface-enhanced Raman spectroscopy
- Quantum dot
- Paul Alivisatos
- Warren Chan
