= NTU School of Chemistry, Chemical Engineering and Biotechnology =

Academic unit of Nanyang Technological University in Singapore

School of Chemistry, Chemical Engineering and Biotechnology
- Established: August 2022
- Parent institution: Nanyang Technological University
- Dean: Prof Shunsuke Chiba
- Location: Singapore
- Website: Official website

The School of Chemistry, Chemical Engineering and Biotechnology (CCEB) is an academic unit of Nanyang Technological University (NTU) in Singapore. The school was announced in December 2021 and launched in August 2022 to consolidate chemistry with chemical and biomedical engineering as part of NTU’s interdisciplinary education push. It is jointly administered by NTU’s College of Science and College of Engineering. As of 2025, the school is chaired by Professor Shunsuke Chiba.

== History ==
NTU announced plans for the school on 16 December 2021 as a joint unit between the College of Science and College of Engineering. The school formally launched with the start of the academic year in August 2022; mainstream coverage noted its role in spearheading interdisciplinary education and research at NTU. Lianhe Zaobao reported that the inaugural intake comprised about 420 students.

== Organisation and administration ==
CCEB operates under NTU’s College of Science and College of Engineering and is led by a chair with associate chairs for academic programmes, research and graduate education, student affairs and safety.

== Academic programmes ==
Undergraduate offerings include B.Sc. in Chemistry and Biological Chemistry, B.Eng. in Chemical & Biomolecular Engineering, and B.Eng. in Bioengineering. In 2025, CCEB is introducing a Bachelor of Engineering Science (Double Major in Process Engineering and Synthetic Chemistry), a four-year programme integrating molecular synthesis with scale-up and process design, reported in the trade press. Graduate offerings include research degrees (e.g. PhD, MEng) and coursework-based master’s programmes across the school’s disciplines.

== Research ==
The school’s research spans organic and inorganic chemistry, physical chemistry, catalysis and materials, chemical & biomolecular engineering, bioengineering and biomedical technology.

== See also ==
- Nanyang Technological University
