= Vijay Sethi =

Indian scientist

- Born: Vijay Sethi
- Employer: Nanyang Business School

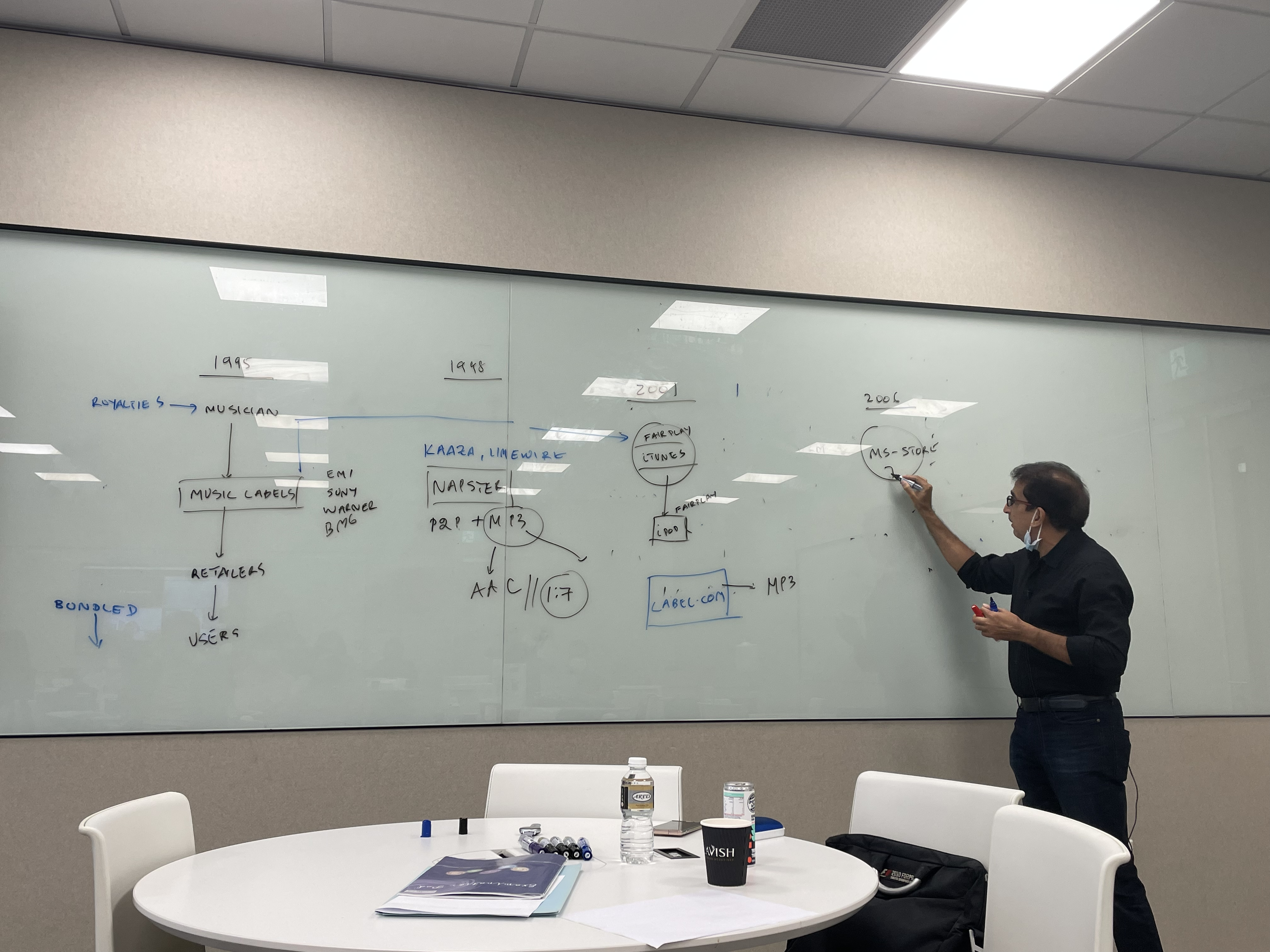
Professor Vijay teaching at NTU PMBA class.

Professor Vijay Sethi is an Indian scientist teaching Information Technology & Operations Management (ITOM) at Singapore’s Nanyang Technological University (NTU). He has been named Business Professor of the Year by the Economist Intelligence Unit (EIU) for being the world's best business educator. He has held a number of leadership positions at the school, including director of international business competitions, coordinator of India strategy, and dean of business program.

== Early life and education ==
Sethi attended the Indian Institute of Technology, Delhi, India, where he earned an undergraduate degree in chemical engineering. In 1984, he went on to attend the Ohio University to attain an MBA. He also obtained a Ph.D. in business administration from the University of Pittsburgh, US.

== Career ==
Prior to being a professor at the Nanyang Business School, NTU, Singapore, Sethi was an assistant professor at the State University of New York (SUNY), University at Buffalo and a designated associate professor at the University of Oklahoma. Dr. Sethi is currently professor in the department of information technology (IT) and operations management at Nanyang Business School, NTU, Singapore. He is also a visiting faculty to the S P Jain School of Global Management (Singapore-Sydney-Dubai).

Sethi specialises in electronic commerce, IT entrepreneurship, strategic information systems planning, IT productivity, and knowledge management. He is published in the top IT journals. He is ranked among the Top 25 MIS Professionals worldwide in terms of research (1991–1996); also his paper was ranked among the Top 25 Most Requested Paper (April 2002 – April 2004) in Information and Management.

Majority of his work deals with digital disruptions, the economics of technology, social media and networks, data analytics, legal and IPR issues, and patterns of new technology evolution. Sethi has also established several new internet business ideas. A lot of these have gone on to win accolades in regional competitions such as the Asia Moot Corp, Bangkok Business Challenge, and global competitions such as the Global Moot Corp (Austin, Texas) and Venture Capital Investment Competition (VCIC, North Carolina, Chapel Hill).

Having worked with a number of Singapore companies as a consultant and for executive education programs, including Abacus International, International Data Corporation, Heller Asia Pacific, Maritime and Port Authority, Trade and Development Board, Singapore Refining Company, Refco, Deutsche Telekom, NTUC, IDA, and MOM, Sethi is an established name in the field.

His research interests include the following:

- Electronic commerce
- Digital strategies
- Technology entrepreneurship
- Strategic information technology planning
- Alignment of business with technology infrastructure
- Measuring business value of information technology

== Awards and recognition ==
Sethi teaches Nanyang MBA, professional MBA and executive MBA participants. He has been voted EMBA Teacher of the Year (2010), MBA Teacher of the Year (2011 & 2013), Teacher of the Division (2012), and has also been awarded the Nanyang Award for Excellence in Teaching (2012, 2013). Sethi was also voted as the Business Professor of the Year, 2013 by the London-based EIU (Economist Intelligence Unit).
