= Nanyang University Memorial =

Memorial tablet

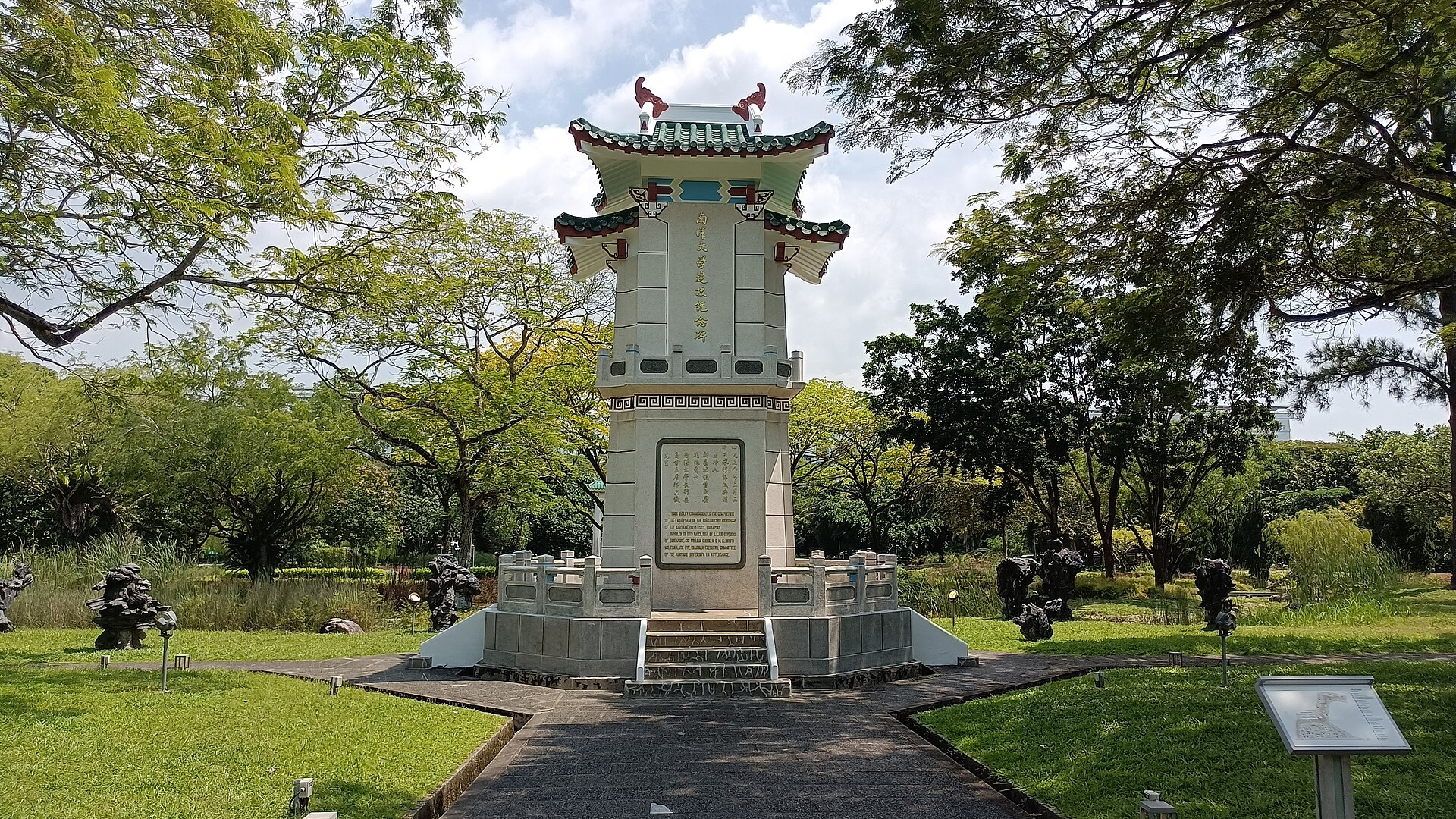
- Location: Nanyang University
- Designer: Koh Tiang Thai
- Builder: Ng Keng Siang
- Type: Tower
- Inauguration date: 30 March 1958; 67 years ago
- Dedicated to: Donors to Nanyang University

The Nanyang University Memorial is a memorial donated by Koh Tiang Thai and revealed by Sir William Goode and Tan Lark Sye, on 30 March 1958. It is located at the center of Yunnan Garden in Nanyang University.

== Background ==
Nanyang University was Southeast Asia’s first ever Chinese language university and Singapore’s second ever university, a turning point for the region.

Ng Keng Siang was a prolific architect who built most of the structures relating to the University, including the Monument.

== Design ==
The memorial is designed in Chinese National style. It is capped with a double-tiered Chinese roof, siting on an octagonal base with steps from the four directions.

== History ==
It was donated by Koh Tiang Thai, was built in 1956 by Ng Keng Siang and revealed on 30 March 1958 to signal the end of the first construction period of former Nanyang University in 1955. It also serves to honor the donors that funded the university building, who primarily were common people.

Unveiled by then governor of Singapore, William Goode and Singaporean businessman Tan Lark Sye in a ceremony with more than 100 guests and 50.000 onlookers. It was gazetted as a single national monument along with the University Library and Administration Building and the nearby Gateway Arch in 1998.

It was restored as part of the Yunnan Garden Rejuvenation Project by STX Landscape, a restoring company, in 2021.

== In popular culture ==
The National Heritage Board of Singapore tasked the Finbarr Fallon Creative Office, a photographic studio, with documenting the Monument and Yunnan Garden as a whole.

The National Library Board of Singapore's archives contain various photographs from diverse timeframes and architectural blueprints of the monument.
