= Dymon Asia =

Singapore investment firm

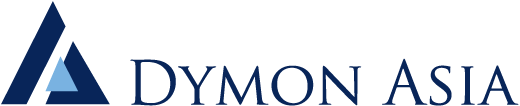
- Type: Private
- Industry: Investment management
- Founded: 2008; 18 years ago
- Founders: Danny Yong; Keith Tan
- Headquarters: Millenia Tower, 1 Temasek Avenue, Singapore
- Products: Hedge fund Private Equity; Venture Capital
- AUM: US$4.8 billion (2025)
- Number of employees: 170+
- Website: www.dymonasia.com

Dymon Asia is an Asia-focused investment management firm based in Singapore. It is considered one of the largest hedge funds in Singapore and Asia.

== History ==
=== 2008 ===
In 2008, Dymon Asia was founded by Danny Yong and Keith Tan. In August 2008, the Tudor Investment Corporation provided US$123 million of seed funding to Dymon Asia. Yong was founding partner and CIO of Abax Global Capital, a hedge fund in Hong Kong that was part-owned by Morgan Stanley. He previously was Head of Asia Macro and Relative Value Trading at Citadel LLC and Head of Trading for South East Asian FX and Derivatives at Goldman Sachs.

=== 2009–2019 ===
In August 2009, the firm separated from Abax Global Capital and was renamed to Dymon Asia. It started accepting capital from outside investors and launched the Dymon Asia Macro Fund (DAMF). Initially, it relied on European investors for half of its money but later raised capital from US investors and pension funds.

In October 2012, Dymon Asia founded its private equity business with the Dymon Asia Private Equity (S.E. ASIA) Fund. Heliconia Capital Management, a subsidiary of Temasek Holdings, committed S$100 million to the fund.

In May 2014, Temasek Holdings invested US$500 million in Dymon Asia and took a minority stake in the company. The firm started the Dymon Asia Equity (DAE) Fund, focused on equity long-short strategies in the Asia-Pacific region.

=== 2020–Present ===
In February 2020, Dymon Asia received seed capital from Leucadia Asset Management, a division of Jefferies Financial Group, and launched the Multi-Strategy Investment Fund (MSIF).

As of June 2025, the Dymon Asia MSIF manages US$3.5 billion in assets.

== Business overview ==
Dymon Asia is an investment firm that invests in both the public equity as well as the private equity markets. It is headquartered in Singapore with additional offices in Hong Kong, Tokyo and London.

Its flagship fund is the Dymon Asia Macro Fund which held US$2 billion assets under management and had a return of 37% in the first quarter of 2020.

In 2020, the US$1 billion Dymon Asia Multi-Strategy Investment Fund was launched.

Aside from the two funds above, Dymon Asia also runs a China Absolute return Bond fund and the Jadea Segregated Portfolio, a Greater China-focused long-short equity fund.

=== Dymon Asia Private Equity ===
In 2012, Dymon Asia Private Equity was founded as the Private Equity arm of Dymon Asia. It is focused on making investments in SME companies in Southeast Asia.

=== Dymon Asia Ventures ===
In 2015, Dymon Asia Ventures was launched as the venture capital arm of Dymon Asia and raised US$50 million in 2017 to invest in fintech companies. In 2020, Dymon Asia Ventures was spun-off as a separate company to form Integra Partners.

Notable investments include Capital Match and QxBranch.
