= Warren Chan =

Warren C. W. Chan
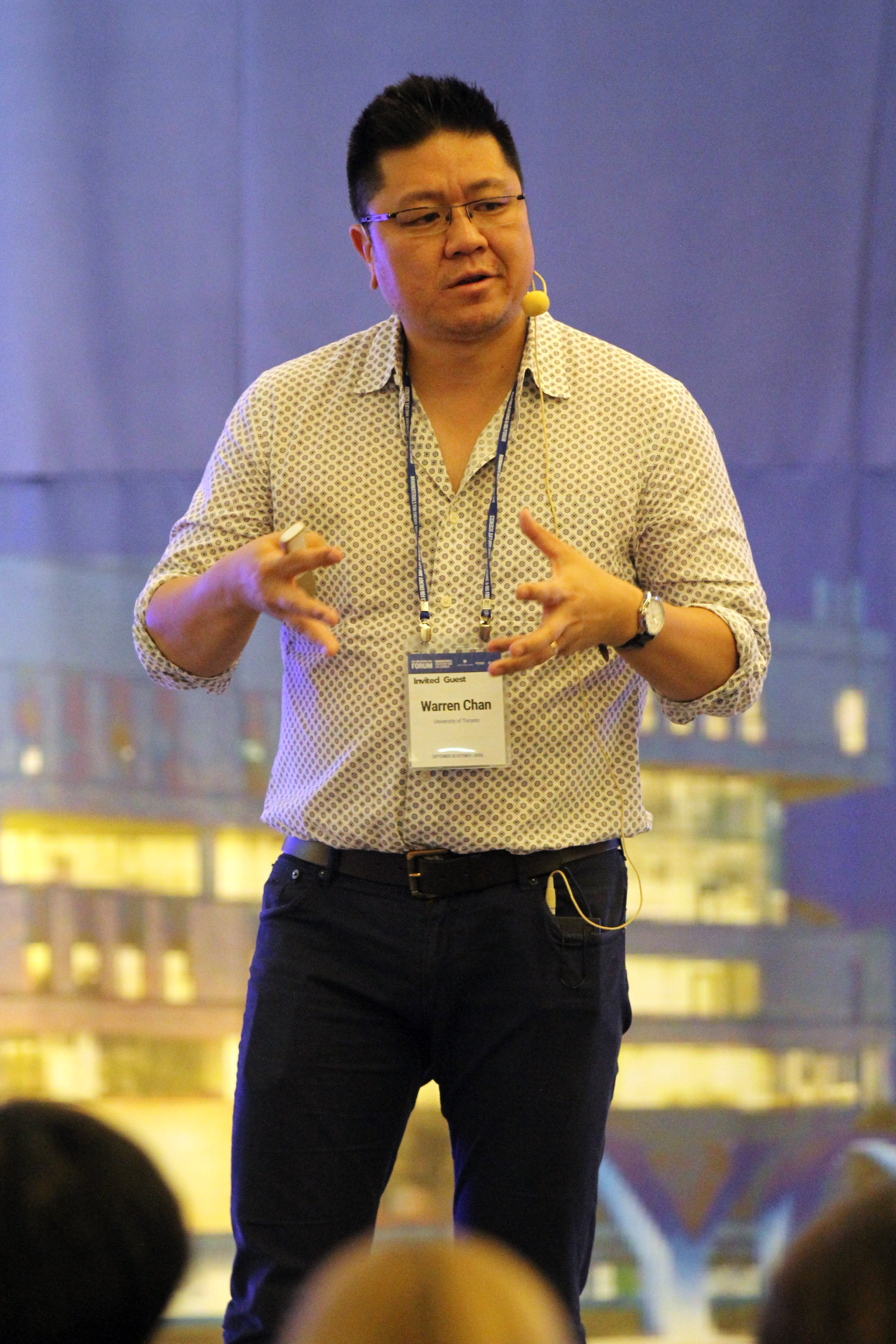
- Born: China
- Education: University of Illinois; Indiana University
- Known for: Quantum dots for biology Nano-bio interactions
- Awards: Kabiller Young Investigator Award (2015); NSERC E.W.R. Steacie Memorial Fellowship (2013); International Dennis Gabor Award (2009); Lord Rank Prize Fund (2006); BF Goodrich Young Inventors Award (1999)
- Scientific career
- Fields: Biomedical Engineering, Nanotechnology
- Workplaces: University of Toronto
- Doctoral advisor: Shuming Nie

Professor Warren Chan is the Dean of the College of Engineering at Nanyang Technological University (NTU) in Singapore. Prior to that, he was a full professor at the Institute of Biomedical Engineering and Terrence Donnelly Centre for Cellular and Biomolecular Research at the University of Toronto. He received his B.S. and PhD degree, and post-doctoral training from the University of Illinois, Indiana University, and University of California, San Diego.

His research lab is focused on the development of nanoparticles for diagnosing and treating cancer and infectious diseases. Some of the contributions he has made to science and engineering has been (a) the development of quantum dots for biomedical applications, (b) the size and shape dependent cellular interactions of nanoparticles in vitro and in vivo, (c) the identification of the protein corona on nanoparticle and its effect on cancer targeting, and (d) the development of a smartphone-based point of care device for diagnosing infected patients. For his research, he has won many Canadian and International Awards (e.g., NSERC E.W.R. Steacie Memorial Fellowship (Canada), International Dennis Gabor Award (Hungary), Rank Prize Fund (UK), and BF Goodrich Young Inventors Award (USA)).

He is currently an Associate Editor of ACS Nano.
