= Louis Phee =

- Occupations: Engineer; academic; entrepreneur
- Known for: Medical robotics; the MASTER endoscopic surgical robot

Louis Phee is a Singaporean engineer, academic and entrepreneur known for his research in medical robotics. He is Vice President (Innovation and Entrepreneurship) and the Tan Chin Tuan Centennial Professor of Mechanical Engineering at Nanyang Technological University (NTU), Singapore.

== Education and early career ==
Phee graduated from NTU with a bachelor's degree in engineering in 1996 and worked for a year as a process engineer at Hewlett-Packard before returning to NTU for a master's degree in medical robotics. He earned his PhD from Scuola Superiore Sant'Anna in Pisa, Italy, in 2002 on a European Union scholarship; his doctoral research included a miniature inchworm-like robot capable of crawling through the colon for cancer screening.

== Research and entrepreneurship ==
Phee's research focuses on medical robotics and mechatronics in medicine, particularly flexible robotic systems for natural-orifice transluminal endoscopic surgery. His Master and Slave Transluminal Endoscopic Robot (MASTER) was conceived over a 2004 dinner with gastroenterologist Lawrence Ho Khek Yu; on the suggestion of Hong Kong surgeon Sydney Chung, the pair modelled the robot's arms on the pincers of a crab. The system uses flexible robotic arms inserted through a patient's mouth to remove tumours in the digestive tract without external incisions. In July 2011, MASTER completed its first clinical trials on patients at the Asian Institute of Gastroenterology in India, with subsequent trials in Hong Kong bringing the total to five patients; doctors reported that procedures conventionally requiring around eight hours were completed in about 17 minutes.

To commercialise the technology, Phee co-founded the medical device company EndoMaster in 2011 and served as its founding chief executive officer. He later co-founded EndoPil in 2019 and has licensed more than ten NTU intellectual properties. He was also the programme manager of A*STAR's inaugural MedTech programme.

== Academic leadership and honours ==
Phee served as Dean of NTU's College of Engineering from 2018 to 2024 and chairs NTUitive, the university's innovation and enterprise company. He is a Fellow of the Academy of Engineering, Singapore. His awards include the Young Scientist Award (2006), the Outstanding Young Persons of Singapore Award (2007), the President's Technology Award (2012) and a National Research Foundation Investigatorship.
