= Microtransplantation =

Microtransplantation (MST) is an advanced technology to treat malignant hematological diseases and tumors by infusing patients with granulocyte colony-stimulating factor (G-CSF) mobilized human leukocyte antigen (HLA)-mismatched allogeneic peripheral blood stem cells following a reduced-intensity chemotherapy or targeted therapy. The term "microtransplantation" comes from its mechanism of reaching donor cell microchimerism.

Chemotherapy is used by lower doses only to destroy cancer and partially suppress patient’s immune system, which will be reinitiated by donor’s stem cells soon after transplantation, and will play a role as recipient-versus-tumor (RVT) effect combining donor cells’ graft-versus-tumor (GVT) effect. Donor’s stem cells, which have been processed, will also accelerate functional recovery of recipient’s hematopoietic stem cells, greatly reducing infections and transplant-related mortality. Practices of microtransplantation has shown none graft-versus-host disease (GVHD) till present, thus immunosuppressive drugs for relieving GVHD wouldn't be necessary. Possible mechanisms of the successful avoidance of GVHD include donor cell microchimerism, less-toxic cells processed prior to transplantation, and the preservation of host immune system that is capable of resisting the GVH alloresponse. Moreover, as HLA-mismatched stem cells are employed, donor availability is extremely extended.

== Medical uses ==
=== Indications ===
Indications for microtransplantation are as follows:

Hematologic Malignancies Tumors

- Acute myeloid leukemia (AML)
- chronic-phase chronic myeloid leukemia (CP-CML)
- Myelodysplastic syndromes (MDS)
- Intermediate- or high-risk Non-Hodgkin lymphoma
- High-risk Hodgkin lymphoma
- Multiplemyeloma (MM)
- Severe aplastic anemia (SAA)

=== Stem cell sources ===
The cells employed are allogeneic peripheral blood stem cells. Matched HLA between donor and recipient is not necessary. The stem cells are collected from donor’s blood through a process known as apheresis after a certain period of daily subcutaneous injections of Granulocyte-colony stimulating factor, serving to mobilize stem cells from the donor's bone marrow into the peripheral circulation. Fresh cells are infused to recipient for the first time, and then stored in a controlled-rate freezer.

Donor’s Requirements:

- Mismatched HLA with recipient
- Age between 18 and 60 years old
- Good overall state of health
- No major heart or lung surgical history
- No infectious diseases such as HIV, hepatitis or syphilis, etc.
- No bone marrow disorder, high blood pressure, coronary heart disease, cardiopulmonary insufficiency, hematological disorder or tumor
- Not allergic to G-CSF
- Not pregnant or lactating

== Clinical studies ==
In a randomized controlled trial from 2004 to 2009, 58 AML patients aged 60–88 years were randomly assigned to receive chemotherapy (control group; n=28) or it plus HLA-mismatched G-CSF–mobilized donor peripheral blood stem cell (G-PBSC) (G-PBSC group/ Microtransplantation; n = 30). The complete remission rate was significantly higher in the G-PBSC group than in the control group (80.0% vs 42.8%); The median recovery times of neutrophils and platelets were 11 days and 14.5 days, respectively, in the G-PBSC group and 16 days and 20 days, respectively, in the control group after chemotherapy; The 2-year probability of disease-free survival (DFS) was significantly higher in the G-PBSC group than in the control group (38.9% vs 10.0%). No graft-versus-host disease was observed in any patient. Persistent donor microchimerism was successfully detected in all of the 4 female patients.

In another long-term research from 2004–2011, 101 patients with AML-CR1 (9 to 65 years old) received Microtransplantation regimen. The 6-year leukemia-free survival (LFS) and overall survival (OS) rates were 84.4% and 89.5%, respectively, in the low-risk group, which were similar to the rates in the intermediate-risk group (59.2% and 65.2%, respectively); The 6-year LFS and OS were 76.4% and 82.1%, respectively, in patients who received a high dose of donor CD3+ T cells, which were significantly higher than the LFS and OS in patients who received a lower dose of donor CD3+ T cells (49.5% and 55.3%, respectively). No GVHD was observed in any of the patients.

The positive results have also been verified by healthcare centers in Italy, America, Spain, etc.

Led by Dr. Huisheng Ai, Guo Mei and their medical team at MST International Clinic for Leukemia in the 307th Hospital of Chinese People’s Liberation Army located in Beijing, multicenter collaborative study on Microtransplantation has started since 2013 in nine authoritative blood institutes from China, Duke University and Keck School of Medicine-University of Southern California in United States, University of Sydney in Australia and University of Montreal in Canada.

== History ==
To overcome the intolerable severe reactions of high-dose chemotherapy and GVHD, as well as the challenge to find HLA-matched donors for conventional hematopoietic stem cell transplantation, Dr Huisheng Ai, Guo Mei, etc. developed a new regimen of reduced-intensity chemotherapy plus G-CSF mobilized HLA-mismatched allogeneic peripheral blood stem cell infusion, which was firstly employed for a 75-year-old patient in 2002 and later named as microtransplantation.

== See also ==
- 307th Hospital of Chinese People’s Liberation Army
