= Saruhashi (disambiguation) =

Saruhashi is a bridge in Ōtsuki, Yamanashi, Japan.

Saruhashi may also refer to:

== People with the surname ==
- Katsuko Saruhashi (猿橋 勝子, 1920–2007), Japanese geochemist
- Nozomu Saruhashi, Japanese businessman

== Other uses ==
- Saruhashi Prize, an award for Japanese women scientists founded by Katsuko Saruhashi
- Saruhashi Station, a railway station in Yamanashi Prefecture, Japan
