= Deng Hongkui =

Chinese immunologist and stem cell researcher

Deng Hongkui (Chinese: 邓宏魁) is a Chinese immunologist and stem cell researcher. He is a Changjiang Professor, the Boya Chair Professor, and Director of the Institute of Stem Cell Research at Peking University. He was awarded US$1.9 million by the Bill & Melinda Gates Foundation for his research on vaccines for HIV and hepatitis C. In 2017, he and Chen Hu engineered resistance to HIV in mice using CRISPR gene editing, and for the first time used the technique on an AIDS patient.

== Biography ==
Deng Hongkui entered Wuhan University in 1980, where he earned his B.Sc. in 1984. He then studied at Shanghai Second Medical College and earned his master's degree in 1987. In 1990, he moved to the United States to study at the University of California, Los Angeles, where he earned his Ph.D. in 1995, under the supervision of Eli Sercarz. From 1995 to 1998 he was an Aaron Diamond Postdoctoral Fellow at the New York University School of Medicine, where he conducted research under Dan Littman. From 1998 to 2001, he worked as research director of ViaCell, a stem cell biotech company based in Boston.

In 2001, Deng was awarded the prestigious Changjiang Professorship by the Chinese government, and returned to China to work at Peking University. He initially worked on treating diabetes using human embryonic stem cells. During the SARS outbreak, he conducted research on SARS treatment and vaccine. In 2006, he was awarded US$1.9 million by the Grand Challenges In Global Health initiative of the Bill & Melinda Gates Foundation, for his research on vaccines for HIV and hepatitis C. He became Director of Peking University's Institute of Stem Cell Research in 2013 and was appointed the Boya Chair Professor in 2016.

In 2017, Deng and his collaborator, Chen Hu of the 307 Hospital, used CRISPR gene editing to transplant human hematopoietic stem cells with the edited CCR5 gene to mice, and conferred HIV resistance to the animals. They subsequently used the technique to treat an AIDS patient who suffered from acute lymphoblastic leukemia (ALL). It was the first time CRISPR was used on a human HIV patient. 19 months later, the patient's ALL was in complete remission. Their research demonstrated the safety of CRISPR for humans, although the therapy was not effective for curing AIDS as only 5% to 8% of the patient's bone marrow cells carried the edited CCR5 gene, much lower than the ideal 100%. Their findings were published in The New England Journal of Medicine in September 2019.
