= Huisheng Ai =

Chinese politician

Huisheng Ai (Chinese: 艾辉胜, born in 1958) is the current director of both the Hematology and Radiation Therapy Departments of the 307th Hospital of Chinese People’s Liberation Army. He joined the hospital in 1983. After a short time working in various departments, he settled in the radiation and homeopathy departments, the most revered in the hospital. Huisheng Ai, Guo Mei, and the medical team developed microtransplantation treatment for leukemia.

== Education ==
Huisheng Ai got his master's degree from Second Military Medical University.

== Honors ==
Huisheng Ai was honored with he Second National Youth Star of Medical Science in 1996. Ai earned second-class Merit in 2004 and 2005. Huisheng Ai was awarded with the title of Silver Star of Science and Technology in 2006.

Huisheng Ai is a member of EGIL (European group for the Immunological classification of Leukemia). He serves as a member of Chinese Society of Clinical Oncology. Ai became a member the editorial board of the journal Blood in 2012.

== Academic papers ==
"HLA-Mismatched Stem-Cell Microtransplantation As Postremission Therapy for Acute Myeloid Leukemia: Long-Term Follow-Up". Journal of Clinical Oncology. 2012-11-20.

"Infusion of HLA-mismatched peripheral blood stem cells improves the outcome of chemotherapy for acute myeloid leukemia in elderly patients". Blood. 2011-01-20.

Guo, M.; Dong, Z.; Qiao, J.; Yu, C.; Sun, Q.; Hu, K.; Liu, G.; Wei, L.; Yao, B.; Man, Q.; Sun, X.; Liu, Z.; Song, Z.; Yu, C.; Chen, Y.; Luo, Q.; Liu, S.; Ai, H. -S. (2014). "Severe acute radiation syndrome: treatment of a lethally 60Co-source irradiated accident victim in China with HLA-mismatched peripheral blood stem cell transplantation and mesenchymal stem cells". Journal of Radiation Research. 55 (2): 205–209. Bibcode:2014JRadR..55..205G. doi:10.1093/jrr/rrt102. PMC 3951066. PMID 23979075.

"The radiation protection and therapy effects of mesenchymal stem cells in mice with acute radiation injury". The British Journal of Radiology.

"Genetic analysis of the KIT and MC1R genes in Chinese indigenous pigs with belt-like coat color phenotypes". Animal Genetics.

"A whole genome scan for quantitative trait loci for leg weakness and its related traits in a large F2 intercross population between White Duroc and Erhualian". Journal of Animal Science.
