= Nonmetallic material =

How the term nonmetal is used in many disciplines

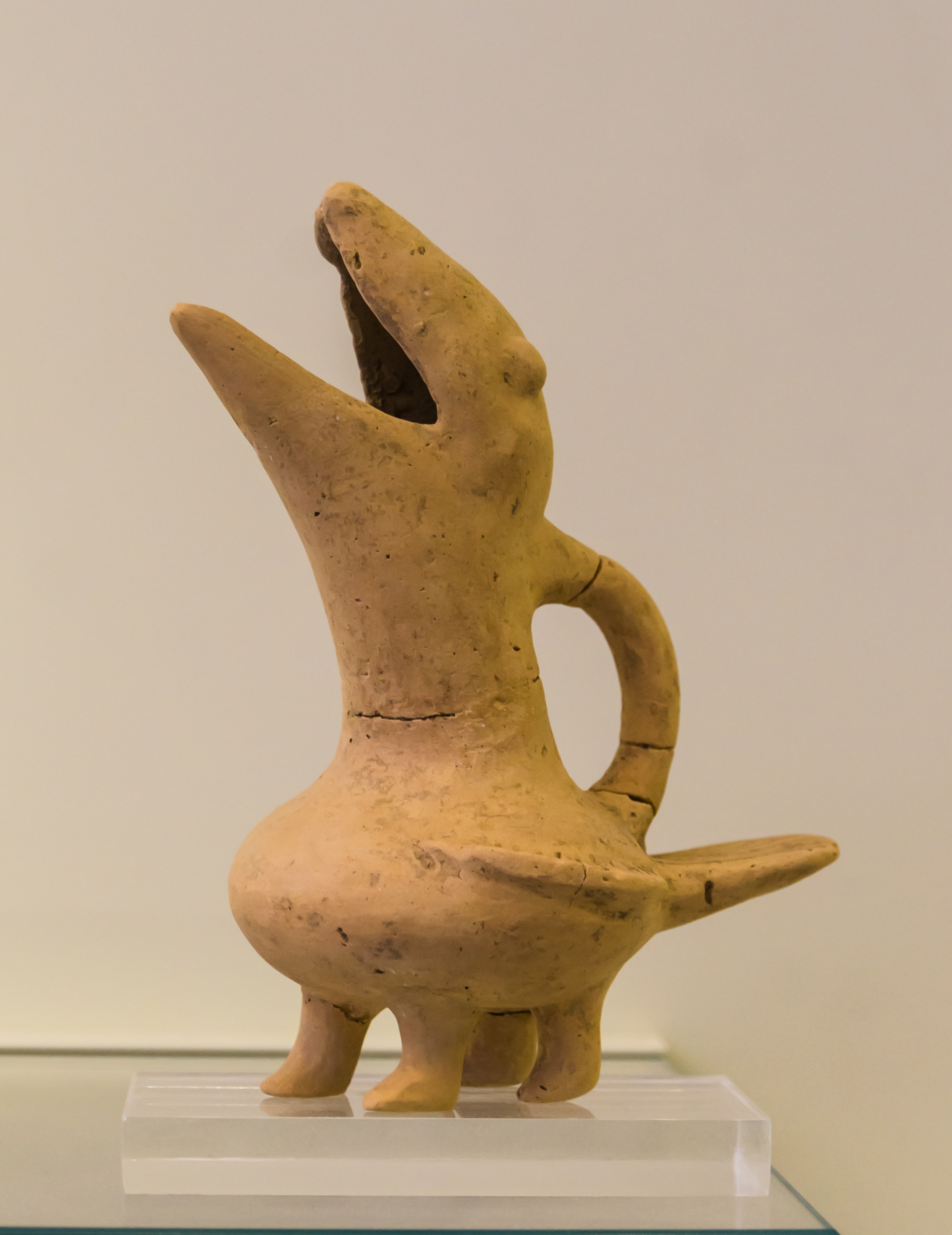
Clay bird shaped ritual vessel archmus Heraklion, 2300-1900 BCE, one of the earlier uses of nonmetallic materials.

Nonmetallic material, or in nontechnical terms a nonmetal, refers to materials which are not metals. Depending upon context it is used in slightly different ways. In everyday life it would be a generic term for those materials such as plastics, wood or ceramics which are not typical metals such as the iron alloys used in bridges. In some areas of chemistry, particularly the periodic table, it is used for just those chemical elements which are not metallic at standard temperature and pressure conditions. It is also sometimes used to describe broad classes of dopant atoms in materials. In general usage in science, it refers to materials which do not have electrons that can readily move around, more technically there are no available states at the Fermi energy, the equilibrium energy of electrons. For historical reasons there is a very different definition of metals in astronomy, with just hydrogen and helium as nonmetals. The term may also be used as a negative of the materials of interest such as in metallurgy or metalworking.

Variations in the environment, particularly temperature and pressure can change a nonmetal into a metal, and vica versa; this is always associated with some major change in the structure, a phase transition. Other external stimuli such as electric fields can also lead to a local nonmetal, for instance in certain semiconductor devices. There are also many physical phenomena which are only found in nonmetals such as piezoelectricity or flexoelectricity.

== General definition ==
Filling of the electronic states in various types of materials at equilibrium. Here, height is energy while width is the density of available states for a certain energy in the material listed. The shade follows the Fermi–Dirac distribution (black: all states filled, white: no state filled). In metals and semimetals the Fermi level E_{F} lies inside at least one band. In insulators and semiconductors the Fermi level is inside a band gap; however, in semiconductors the bands are near enough to the Fermi level to be thermally populated with electrons or holes. "intrin." indicates intrinsic semiconductors.

The original approach to conduction and nonmetals was a band-structure with delocalized electrons (i.e. spread out in space). In this approach a nonmetal has a gap in the energy levels of the electrons at the Fermi level. In contrast, a metal would have at least one partially occupied band at the Fermi level; in a semiconductor or insulator there are no delocalized states at the Fermi level, see for instance Ashcroft and Mermin. These definitions are equivalent to stating that metals conduct electricity at absolute zero, as suggested by Nevill Francis Mott, and the equivalent definition at other temperatures is also commonly used as in textbooks such as Chemistry of the Non-Metals by Ralf Steudel and work on metal–insulator transitions.

In early work this band structure interpretation was based upon a single-electron approach with the Fermi level in the band gap as illustrated in the Figure, not including a complete picture of the many-body problem where both exchange and correlation terms can matter, as well as relativistic effects such as spin-orbit coupling. A key addition by Mott and Rudolf Peierls was that these could not be ignored. For instance, nickel oxide would be a metal if a single-electron approach was used, but in fact has quite a large band gap. As of 2024 it is more common to use an approach based upon density functional theory where the many-body terms are included. Rather than single electrons, the filling involves quasiparticles called orbitals, which are the single-particle like solutions for a system with hundreds to thousands of electrons. Although accurate calculations remain a challenge, reasonable results are now available in many cases.

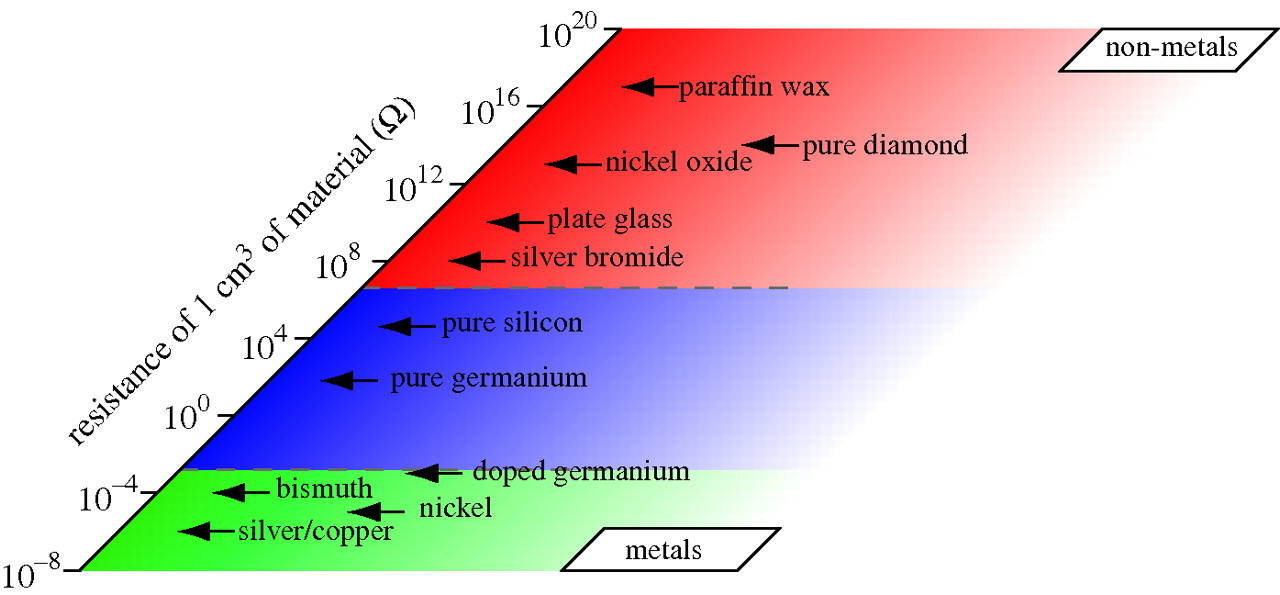
Room temperature electrical resistivity of various materials.

It is also common to nuance somewhat the early definitions of Alan Herries Wilson and Mott. As discussed by both the chemist Peter Edwards and colleagues, as well as Fumiko Yonezawa,it is also important in practice to consider the temperatures at which both metals and nonmetals are used. Yonezawa provides a general definition:

When a material 'conducts' and at the same time 'the temperature coefficient of the electric conductivity of that material is not positive under a certain environmental condition,' the material is metallic under that environmental condition. A material which does not satisfy these requirements is not metallic under that environmental condition.

Band structure definitions of metallicity are the most widely used, and apply both to single elements such as insulating boron as well as compounds such as strontium titanate. (There are many compounds which have states at the Fermi level and are metallic, for instance titanium nitride.) There are many experimental methods of checking for nonmetals by measuring the band gap, or by ab-initio quantum mechanical calculations.

== Functional definition ==
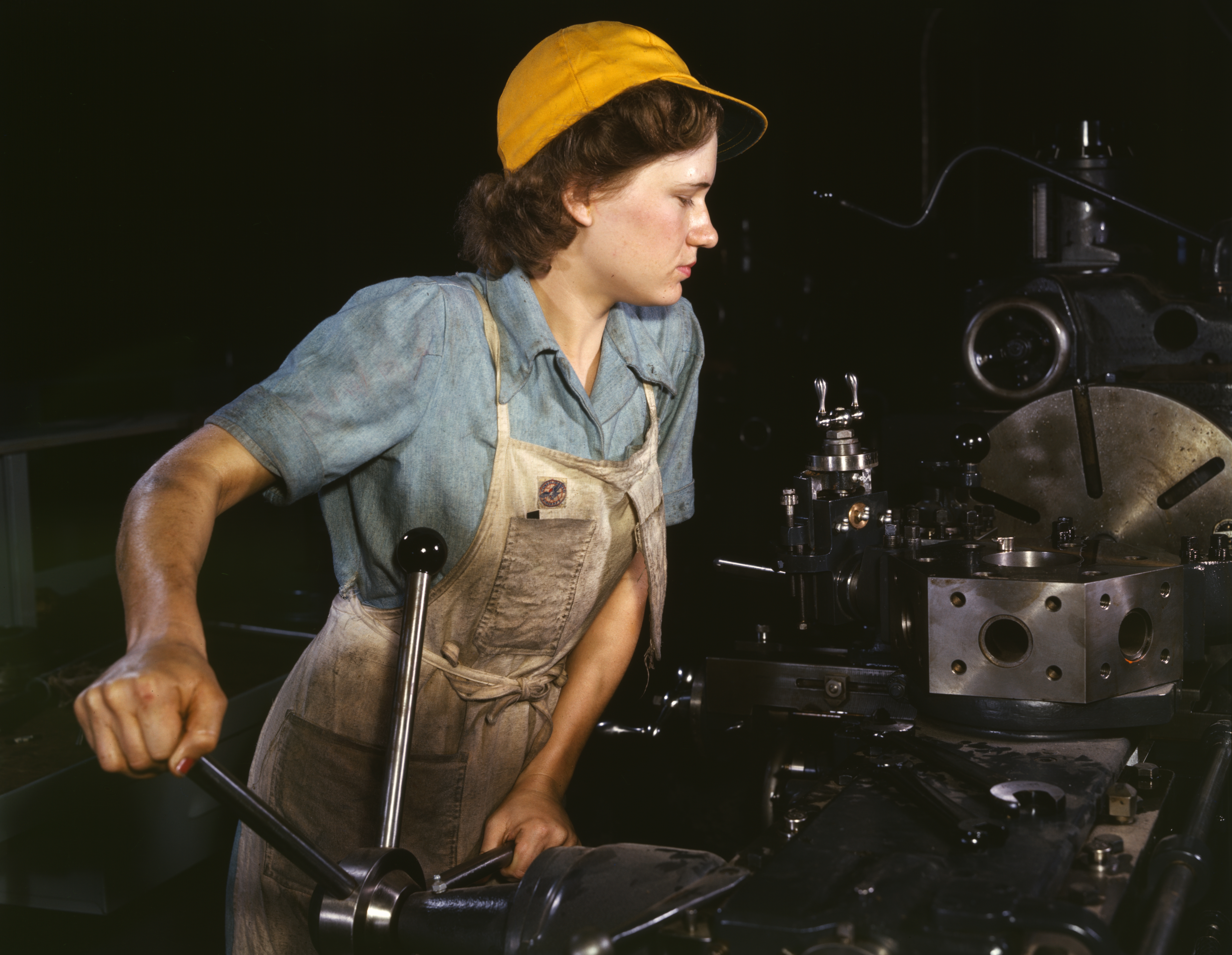
A turret lathe operator machining metallic parts for transport planes in the 1940s.

An alternative in metallurgy is to consider various malleable alloys such as steel, aluminium alloys and similar as metals, and other materials as nonmetals; fabricating metals is termed metalworking, but there is no corresponding term for nonmetals. A loose definition such as this is often the common usage, but can also be inaccurate. For instance, in this usage plastics are nonmetals, but in fact there are (electrically) conducting polymers which should formally be described as metals. Similar, but slightly more complex, many materials which are (nonmetal) semiconductors behave like metals when they contain a high concentration of dopants, being called degenerate semiconductors. A general introduction to much of this can be found in the 2017 book by Fumiko Yonezawa

== Periodic table elements ==
The periodic table

The term nonmetal (chemistry) is also used for those elements which are not metallic in their normal ground state; compounds are sometimes excluded from consideration. Some textbooks use the term nonmetallic elements such as the Chemistry of the Non-Metals by Ralf Steudel, which also uses the general definition in terms of conduction and the Fermi level. The approach based upon the elements is often used in teaching to help students understand the periodic table of elements, although it is a teaching oversimplification. Those elements towards the top right of the periodic table are nonmetals, those towards the center (transition metal and lanthanide) and the left are metallic. An intermediate designation metalloid is used for some elements.

The term is sometimes also used when describing dopants of specific elements types in compounds, alloys or combinations of materials, using the periodic table classification. For instance metalloids are often used in high-temperature alloys, and nonmetals in precipitation hardening in steels and other alloys. Here the description implicitly includes information on whether the dopants tend to be electron acceptors that lead to covalently bonded compounds rather than metallic bonding or electron acceptors.

Solar spectrum with Fraunhofer lines as it appears visually.

== Nonmetals in astronomy ==
A quite different approach is used in astronomy where the term metallicity is used for all elements heavier than helium, so the only nonmetals are hydrogen and helium. This is a historical anomaly. In 1802, William Hyde Wollaston noted the appearance of a number of dark features in the solar spectrum. In 1814, Joseph von Fraunhofer independently rediscovered the lines and began to systematically study and measure their wavelengths, and they are now called Fraunhofer lines. He mapped over 570 lines, designating the most prominent with the letters A through K and weaker lines with other letters.

About 45 years later, Gustav Kirchhoff and Robert Bunsen noticed that several Fraunhofer lines coincide with characteristic emission lines identified in the spectra of heated chemical elements. They inferred that dark lines in the solar spectrum are caused by absorption by chemical elements in the solar atmosphere. Their observations were in the visible range where the strongest lines come from metals such as Na, K, Fe. In the early work on the chemical composition of the sun the only elements that were detected in spectra were hydrogen and various metals, with the term metallic frequently used when describing them. In contemporary usage all the extra elements beyond just hydrogen and helium are termed metallic.

The astrophysicst Carlos Jaschek, and the stellar astronomer and spectroscopist Mercedes Jaschek, in their book The Classification of Stars, observed that:

Stellar interior specialists use 'metals' to designate any element other than hydrogen and helium, and in consequence 'metal abundance' implies all elements other than the first two. For spectroscopists this is very misleading, because they use the word in the chemical sense. On the other hand photometrists, who observe combined effects of all lines (i.e. without distinguishing the different elements) often use this word 'metal abundance', in which case it may also include the effect of the hydrogen lines.

== Metal-insulator transition ==
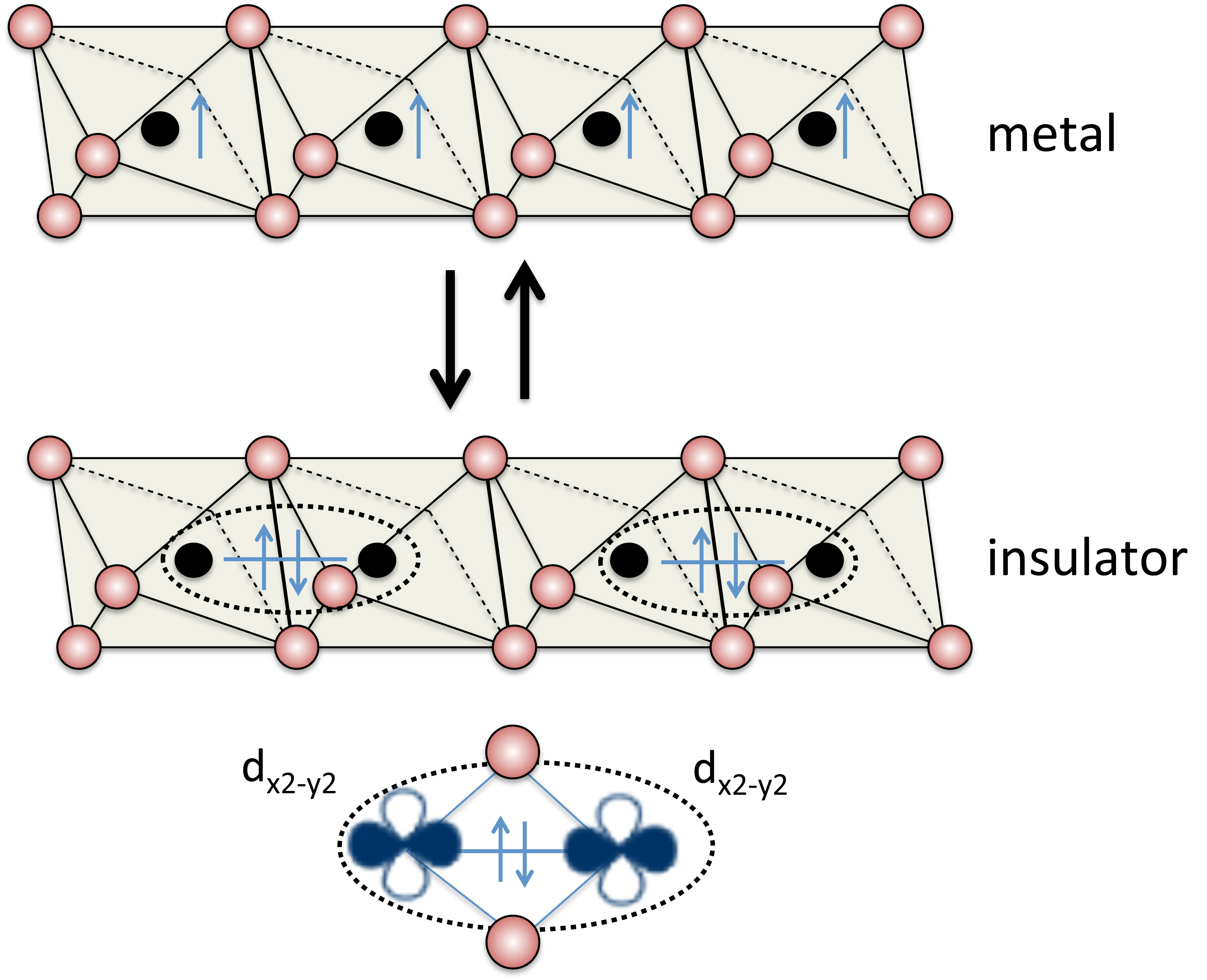
Small changes in positions and d-levels lead to a metal-insulator transition in vanadium dioxide.

There are many cases where an element or compound is metallic under certain circumstances, but a nonmetal in others. One example is metallic hydrogen which forms under very high pressures. There are many other cases as discussed by Mott, Inada et al. and more recently by Yonezawa.

There can also be local transitions to a nonmetal, particularly in semiconductor devices. One example is a field-effect transistor where an electric field can lead to a region where there are no electrons at the Fermi energy (depletion zone).

== Properties specific to nonmetals ==
A polarised dielectric material

Nonmetals have a wide range of properties, for instance the nonmetal diamond is the hardest known material, while the nonmetal molybdenum disulfide is a solid lubricants used in space. There are some properties specific to them not having electrons at the Fermi energy. The main ones, for which more details are available in the links are:

- Dielectric polarization, approximately equivalent to alignment of local dipoles with an electric field, as in capacitors.
- Electrostriction, a change in volume due to an electric field, or more accurately polarization density.
- Flexoelectricity, where there is a coupling between strain gradients and polarization. This plays a role in the generation of static electricity due to the triboelectric effect.
- Piezoelectricity, a coupling between polarization and linear strains.
- A decreased resistance with temperature, due to having more carriers (via Fermi–Dirac statistics) available in partially occupied higher energy bands
- Increased conductivity when illuminated with light or ultraviolet radiation, called photoconductivity. This is similar to the effect of temperature, but with the photons exciting electrons into partially occupied states.
- Transmit electric fields as in the capacitor figure above; in a metal there is electric-field screening that prevents this beyond very small distances, see Classical Electrodynamics.

== See also ==
- Abundance of the chemical elements
- Charge-transfer insulators – Nonmetal due to charge transfer between atoms
- Charge transport mechanisms – Models for electric current flow
- Dielectric strength – Degree of insulation
- Electrical conduction – Measure of a substance's ability to resist or conduct electric current
- Kondo insulator – Strongly correlated system with a narrow band gap at low temperatures
- List of data references for chemical elements
- List of manufacturing processes – Manufacturing processes
- List of materials properties
- List of states of matter
- Metallicity distribution function – Distribution within a group of stars of the ratio of iron to hydrogen in a star
- Mott insulator – Electrical insulators that are conventionally expected to be conductors
- Superconductor-insulator transition – Type of quantum phase transition
- Topological insulator – State of matter with insulating bulk but conductive boundary
