= Katsuko Saruhashi =

Japanese geochemist (1920–2007)

- Born: March 22, 1920; Tokyo, Japan
- Died: September 29, 2007 (aged 87); Tokyo, Japan
- Education: Imperial Women's College of Science (predecessor of Toho University); University of Tokyo
- Known for: Discovery of the dangers of radioactive fallout in seawater and the atmosphere
- Awards: Avon Special Prize for Women (1981) Miyake Prize for Geochemistry (1985) Tanaka Prize of the Society of Sea Water Sciences (1993)
- Scientific career
- Fields: Geochemistry
- Workplaces: Meteorological Research Institute; Japan Meteorological Agency

Katsuko Saruhashi (猿橋 勝子, Saruhashi Katsuko; March 22, 1920 – September 29, 2007) was a Japanese geochemist who created tools that let her take some of the first measurements of carbon dioxide (CO_{2}) levels in seawater. She later showed evidence of the dangers of radioactive fallout and how far it can travel. Along with this focus on safety, she also researched peaceful uses of nuclear power.

Her other major area of significance involved raising the number and status of women scientists, especially in Japan. She established both the Society of Japanese Women Scientists and the Saruhashi Prize, which is awarded annually to a female scientist who serves as a role model for younger women scientists.

Among her other honors, she was the first woman elected to the Science Council of Japan, to earn a doctorate in chemistry from the prestigious University of Tokyo, and to win the Miyake Prize for Geochemistry.

== Education ==
Saruhashi was born in Tokyo in 1920. At a very young age, Saruhashi wanted to know what made it rain. This fascination was derived from watching raindrops slide down windows one day during primary school. Kuniharu and Kuno Saruhashi both saw the importance of education and supported their daughter after their shared experience during World War 2, where many women struggled to support themselves without husbands or fathers. Saruhashi and her mother understood that there was a lack of women with technical knowledge and figured that it could be useful to gain financial independence. At the age of 21, Saruhsashi quit her secure job at an insurance firm to attend the Imperial Women's College of Science, now known as Toho University, where she earned a degree in chemistry.

After graduating in 1943 with an undergraduate degree in chemistry, Saruhashi took a position at the Meteorological Research Institute where she worked with her mentor Miyake Yasuo, and her scientific career took off. Saruhashi went back to school to get her PhD in chemistry at the University of Tokyo in 1957, where she was the first woman to graduate with a PhD in science. Her dissertation was on "The Behavior of Carbonic Matter in Natural Water".

== Career ==
Saruhashi conducted research with Teruko Kanzawa from 1973 to 1978. They began their research by measuring the pH of every rainfall event over the five-year period at the Meteorological Research Institute in Tokyo. On average, they found the pH to be around 4.52 which was an increase from 4.1 in the previous years of research done by Miyake in 1939. According to Miyake, the pH varied during different seasons (summer and winter); however, Saruhashi noted no variation between seasons in their findings, showing how conditions changed during the 1970s.

=== Nuclear tests ===
Katsuko Saruhashi made several discoveries in both geochemistry and, most notably, oceanography. The most salient of these are: Saruhashi's Table; her novel method for measuring the amounts of caesium-137 and strontium-90 in seawater, and her research concerning the environmental impact of the US bomb test site, Bikini Atoll, which ultimately provided justification for the prohibition of above-ground nuclear testing. She also made important contributions to the study of the carbon dioxide system in the oceans, finding that the Pacific Ocean emits more CO_{2} than it absorbs.

=== Saruhashi's table ===
Presented in her 1955 paper ‘On the Equilibrium Concentration Ratio of Carbonic Acid Substances Dissolved in Natural Waters: A study on the Metabolism in Natural Waterways’, Saruhashi's table provided oceanographers with a method for determining the composition of three carbonic acid substances based on water temperature, pH, and salinity.

=== Artificial radioisotopes in seawater ===
In response to the influx of nuclear testing occurring in the Pacific, the Japanese Government requested that Saruhashi – along with Yasuo Miyake - lead a research project into the long-term and global effects of such activities. To do so, Saruhashi worked at the Central Meteorological Observatory in Tokyo to find a new method for measuring radioactive fallout. The findings of Saruhashi and Miyake investigation were explicated in their paper 'Cesium 137 and Strontium 90 in Sea Water'.

Their studies concluded that in the Western North Pacific, there were substantially higher amounts of ^{137}Cs and ^{90}Sr than were found in samples obtained from the Atlantic and Northeast Pacific. Given these results, Saruhashi and Miyake concluded that the differing quantities of artificial radioisotopes found in the Pacific was a direct consequence of the nuclear testing occurring in the Pacific Tropics.

Despite the corroborating evidence in favor of Saruhashi's claim concerning the discrepancy in the quantity of ^{137}Cs and ^{90}Sr present in different regions of the Atlantic and North Pacific, conclusion was challenged by {American scientists}, who called into doubt the methodology and technique applied by Saruhashi's team; contending that their novel investigatory method was fallible and erroneous.

=== Bikini Atoll fallout ===
The contention surrounding the methodology that Saruhashi's team used was settled two years after the publication of her research concerning the artificial radioisotopes in seawater. The US Atomic Energy Commission funded a six-month long lab swap in which Saruhashi met with fellow oceanographer Ted Folsom at the Scripps Institution of Oceanography at the University of San Diego. Saruhashi's team used absolute standards for ^{137}Cs, different from those accepted by the scientific community in the United States. This largely attributed to the skepticism of American scientists regarding Saruhashi's work, as well as the political climate at the time. The United States was likely against the ban on above-ground nuclear testing, as this would make it more difficult for them to develop nuclear weapons. In order to compare the two scientists' respective methods for the analysis of ^{137}Cs in seawater, Saruhashi and Folsom were both tasked with analyzing the values of ^{137}Cs present in identical samples of seawater. Despite the independent absolute standards of ^{137}Cs, and use of different reagents and gamma analytical techniques, there was less than 10% discrepancy between the results of the two laboratories. Some discrepancy can be attributed to inconsistent settling of the sediment during the specimen's travel by boat. Although efforts were made to ensure that the samples being compared were as similar as possible, this experiment relied on the assumption that the samples compared were identical, which is unlikely since the precise location and time of collection varied. However, the results of the two laboratories were extremely similar. After the six-month lab-exchange ended, it was clear that Saruhashi's method provided incredibly accurate and consistent results; and therefore, the two distinct analytical techniques were both appropriate scientific approaches for measuring the quantity of artificial radioisotopes in seawater. As a result, given they were no longer subject to dispute, Saruhashi's findings could serve as justification for the prohibition of above-ground nuclear testing.

=== Seawater carbon dioxide absorption ===
In 1956, Saruhashi and Miyake discussed in great detail how oxidation of organic material served to augment the values of carbon dioxide present in seawater. Previous to their study, it was believed that the high values of carbon dioxide and alkalinity present in the oceans resulted from the dissolution of calcium carbonate. Saruhashi demonstrated that this hypothesis was untenable; as a consequence, scientists were no longer able to purport that global warming could be mitigated naturally by seawater's supposed capacity for the absorption of carbon dioxide gas. Instead, Saruhashi and Miyake provided empirical evidence that seawater in the Pacific releases twice as much CO_{2} as it absorbs.

== Awards and honors ==
- 1958 - established the Society of Japanese Women Scientists to promote women in the sciences and contribute to world peace.
- 1979 - named executive director of the Geochemical Laboratory.
- 1980 - first woman elected to the Science Council of Japan.
- 1981 - won the Avon Special Prize for Women, for researching peaceful uses of nuclear power and raising the status of women scientists.
- 1981 - established the Saruhashi Prize, given yearly to a female scientist who serves as a role model for younger women scientists.
- 1985 - first woman to win the Miyake Prize for geochemistry.
- 1993 - won the Tanaka Prize from the Society of Sea Water Sciences.

Saruhashi was an honorary member of the Geochemical Society of Japan and the Oceanographical Society of Japan.

On 22 March 2018, Google displayed a Google Doodle honoring Saruhashi on what would have been her 98th birthday.

In December 2021, a dramatization of Saruhashi's life as a scientist was broadcast in Japan, starring Kiko Mizuhara.

== Influence over women in science ==
Saruhashi spent much of her career actively fighting for equal opportunity in science and advocating for women. She acknowledged the reasons why women are under-represented in science, saying, “the lack of equal opportunity is one. There is also the attitude of society, of parents and teachers. And there is little recognition of the contributions of women scientists.” She worked to establish both funding opportunities and community for women scientists.

In 1958, Saruhashi established the Society of Japanese Women Scientists to promote Japanese women in science. In 1967, she attended the second International Conference of Women Engineers and Scientists with a group of Japanese women scientists and engineers, speaking on the Importance of Fishery in Food Problems.

In 1981, she established the Saruhashi Prize, a $2400 cash award given to a Japanese woman fifty years old or younger who has made considerable contributions in the physical sciences. The award is also intended to help those wanting to pursue projects overseas. Saruhashi wanted to gift the award recipients larger amounts, contributing personally and with help from friends, but the funds are small compared to other prizes.

== Selected publications ==
Her publications include:

- Saruhashi, K. (November 30, 1953). "The Chlorinity Determination of Sea Water by a Micro-analytical Method". Papers in Meteorology and Geophysics. 4 (2): 90–92. doi:10.2467/mripapers1950.4.2_90. ISSN 0031-126X.
- Saruhashi, K (1955). "A study on the metabolism in natural waters. II. On the equilibrium concentration ratio of carbonic acid substances dissolved in natural waters". J. Chem. Soc. Jpn. 76: 1294–1308.
- "Distribution of Man-Made Radioactivity in the North Pacific Through Summer 1955". J. Marine Res. (Sears Found. Marine Res.). 17. November 28, 1958. OSTI 4625568.
- MIYAKE, Yasuo; SARUHASHI, Katsuko; KATSURAGI, Yukio; KANAZAWA, Teruko (June 1, 1962). "The Peak in radioactive Fallout in the Temperate Zone of the Northern Hemisphere". Journal of Radiation Research. 3 (3): 148–152. Bibcode:1962JRadR...3..148M. doi:10.1269/jrr.3.148. ISSN 0449-3060.

== See also ==
- Timeline of women in science
