= Shihoko Ishii =

Japanese mathematician

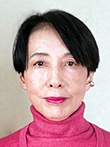
- Born: 1950
- Education: Tokyo Metropolitan University
- Known for: Singularity theory
- Scientific career
- Fields: Mathematics
- Workplaces: University of Tokyo

Shihoko Ishii (Japanese: 石井志保子, born 1950) is a Japanese mathematician and professor at the University of Tokyo. Her research area is algebraic geometry.

== Education ==
Ishii received her bachelor's degree from Tokyo Women's Christian University in 1973 and her master's degree from Waseda University in 1975. She later earned her PhD from Tokyo Metropolitan University in 1983.

== Research ==
Ishii's research focuses on singularity theory. She studies arc spaces, a mathematical concept related to jets: arc spaces are varieties encapsulating information about curves on another variety.

== Awards and honours ==
Ishii received the Saruhashi Prize for accomplishments by a Japanese woman researcher in the natural sciences in 1995. As a postdoc, Ishii was inspired by reading a profile of Fumiko Yonezawa, a physicist and former winner of the Saruhashi prize.

Ishii received the Algebra Prize from the Mathematical Society of Japan in 2011.

In 2022, she became a laureate of the Asian Scientist 100 by the Asian Scientist.
