= Nonmetal (disambiguation) =

Nonmetal may refer to:

- Nonmetals in the periodic table or non-metallic elements, are elements that have high electronegativity and mostly lack distinctive metallic properties.
- Nonmetal, in astronomy, the two elements hydrogen and helium without metallicity.
- Nonmetallic material, all materials, both elements and compounds, which are not metals; the term is used in different ways depending on context.
