= Motoko Kotani =

Japanese applied mathematician and academic administrator

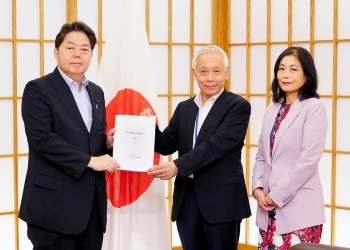

Motoko Kotani (Japanese: 小谷 元子, born 1960) is a Japanese applied mathematician, specializing in discrete geometric analysis and crystallography, and an academic administrator. She is the executive vice president for research for Tohoku University, the former executive director of Riken, the former president of the Mathematical Society of Japan, and the president-elect of the International Science Council.

== Education ==
Kotani graduated from the University of Tokyo in 1983. She went to Tokyo Metropolitan University for graduate study, earning a master's degree in 1985 and completing her doctorate in 1990.

== Academic career ==
She was a lecturer at Toho University from 1990 to 1997, and an associate professor there from 1997 to 1999, with a term as a postdoctoral researcher in Germany at the Max Planck Institute for Mathematics from 1993 to 1994. In 1999, she moved to the Mathematics Institute of Tohoku University. She was named as a distinguished professor there in 2008 and as director of the WPI Research Center, Advanced Institute for Materials Research in 2012. She became executive director of Riken from 2017 to 2020, while continuing to hold a position as a researcher at Tohoku. In 2020 she was named executive vice president for research.

== Service ==
Kotani was president of the Mathematical Society of Japan from 2015 to 2016. She became president-elect of the International Science Council in 2021, for a three-year term beginning in 2024. In 2022 the Japanese Ministry of Foreign Affairs named her as Science and Technology Co-Advisor to the Minister for Foreign Affairs.

== Recognition ==
Kotani was the 2005 winner of the Saruhashi Prize.
