= Chen Hu (physician) =

Chinese military physician and stem cell researcher (1962–2019)

Chen Hu (Chinese: 陈虎; 17 February 1962 – 24 July 2019) was a Chinese military physician and stem cell researcher. He served as Director of the PLA Institute of Hematopoietic Stem Cell Research and the Beijing Hematopoietic Stem Cell Therapy Laboratory. Known for his research on hematopoietic stem cell therapy for leukemia, he was awarded the State Science and Technology Progress Award (First Class) in 2015 and the Ho Leung Ho Lee Prize in 2016. In 2017, he and Deng Hongkui engineered resistance to HIV in mice using CRISPR gene editing, and for the first time used the technique on an AIDS patient. He died of a sudden heart attack before their findings were published.

== Biography ==
Chen Hu was born 17 February 1962 in Chongqing, China, with his ancestral home in Luoyang, Henan. He enlisted in the People's Liberation Army (PLA) in September 1979 and enrolled at the Third Military Medical University (now Army Medical University). He earned both a Ph.D. and an M.D.

After graduation, Chen became a physician at the Affiliated Hospital of the Academy of Military Medical Sciences. He later served as Director of the Beijing Hematopoietic Stem Cell Therapy Laboratory and Director of the PLA Institute of Hematopoietic Stem Cell Research at the Fifth Medical Center (formerly the 307 Hospital) of the People's Liberation Army General Hospital in Beijing.

Chen spent more than 30 years researching treatment for leukemia, with a focus on hematopoietic stem cell (HSC) therapy. He treated more than 40,000 patients and performed over 3,200 HSC transplants, improving the survival rate from nearly 0% at the beginning to 65%. In 2015, his research on the treatment of radiation damage using adult stem cells won the State Science and Technology Progress Award (First Class). A year later, he won the Ho Leung Ho Lee Prize for Science and Technology Progress.

In 2017, Chen and his collaborator, Deng Hongkui of Peking University, used CRISPR gene editing to transplant human HSCs with the edited CCR5 gene to mice, and conferred HIV resistance to the animals. They subsequently used the technique to treat an AIDS patient who suffered from acute lymphoblastic leukemia (ALL). It was the first time CRISPR was used on a human HIV patient. 19 months later, the patient's ALL was in complete remission. Their research demonstrated the safety of CRISPR for humans, although the therapy was not effective for curing AIDS as only 5% to 8% of the patient's bone marrow cells carried the edited CCR5 gene, much lower than the ideal 100%. Their research was published in The New England Journal of Medicine in September 2019, after Chen had died.

On 24 July 2019, Chen Hu died from a sudden heart attack in Beijing, aged 57. At the time of his death he was a candidate for election to the Chinese Academy of Sciences.
