= Reiko Kuroda =

Japanese chemist

- 黒田 玲子
- Born: October 7 1947; Akita, Japan
- Education: University of Tokyo
- Awards: Sarahushi Prize
- Scientific career
- Fields: Chemistry
- Workplaces: King's College London Institute of Cancer Research University of Tokyo

Reiko Kuroda (黒田 玲子, Kuroda Reiko; born October 7, 1947) is a Japanese chemist who is a professor at the Department of Life Sciences at the University of Tokyo.

== Early life and education ==
Kuroda was born in Akita but grew up in Miyagi, on the island of Honshu, Japan. She obtained her MSc (1972) and PhD (1975) in Chemistry from the University of Tokyo. Her doctorate focused on determining the stereochemistry of metal complexes.

== Career ==
After her PhD, Kuroda worked at King's College London and the Institute of Cancer Research in the UK before returning to Japan in 1986. In 1992 she became the first woman to be made full professor of natural sciences at the University of Tokyo.

Kuroda's field of research is primarily chirality within both inorganic chemistry and organic chemistry. Part of her research has involved studying chirality in snail shells. Her work identified that the direction of the shell spiral is determined at very early stages of snail development. Her team later used CRISPR genetic editing to show that this process is dependent on a single gene, Lsdia1.

Kuroda has established the Science Interpreter Training Program at the University of Tokyo and was appointed to serve as a governor for the Cambridge Crystallographic Data Centre in 2006. She has also served as Vice-President for External Relations in the International Science Council.

== Honours and awards ==
in 1993, Kuroda received the Saruhashi Prize for esteemed female scientists.

On June 10, 2009, Kuroda was elected a foreign member of the Royal Swedish Academy of Sciences in its class for chemistry.

In 2013, Kuroda was awarded the L'Oréal-UNESCO Awards for Women in Science. She has been nominated for awards by the Human Frontier Science Programme (HFSP) and by AcademiaNet.
