= Hiroko Nagahara =

Japanese cosmochemist and astromineralogist

Hiroko Nagahara (Japanese: 永原 裕子, born 1952) is a Japanese cosmochemist and astromineralogist whose research studies the chemical composition and formation of chondrules, the molten mineral droplets that accrete to form asteroids and meteoroids. She is a fellow of the Earth–Life Science Institute of the Tokyo Institute of Technology, a professor emerita of Tokyo University, and a former president of the Meteoritical Society.

== Education and career ==
Nagahara was born in 1952 in Tokyo, and studied in the faculty of science and engineering at Waseda University, graduating in 1970, earning a master's degree in 1976. She completing a doctorate in 1983 through the University of Tokyo, supervised by Ikuo Kushiro.

She joined the University of Tokyo as an assistant professor in 1984, and became a full professor there in 2001.

== Recognition ==
Nagahara was the 2001 winner of the Saruhashi Prize. She was the 2015 winner of the J. Lawrence Smith Medal of the National Academy of Sciences "for her work on the kinetics of evaporation and condensation processes in the early Solar System and her fundamental contributions to one of the most enduring mysteries in meteoritics, the formation of the chondrules that constitute the characteristic component of the most abundant group of meteorites." In 2016 the Meteoritical Society gave Nagahara the Leonard Medal, its highest award.

In 2018, Nagahara was named as a Fellow of the Japan Geoscience Union (JpGU), "for pioneering and innovative contributions to cosmochemistry, meteoritics, and planetary science, and also for outstanding contributions to the Earth and planetary science community".

Asteroid 6225 Hiroko, discovered in 1981, was named for her.
