= Dan Littman =

American immunologist

Dan R. Littman
- Education: Washington University in St. Louis; Princeton University
- Known for: Work on CD4 T lymphocytes
- Awards: William B. Coley Award (2016); New York City Mayor's Prize for Excellence in Science and Technology; Invitrogen Meritorious Career Award of the American Association of Immunologists; Searle Scholar Award; Alexander Berg Prize in Microbiology and Immunology
- Scientific career
- Workplaces: New York University; University of California, San Francisco; Columbia University
- Academic advisors: Richard Axel
- Notable students: Deng Hongkui

Dan R. Littman is an American immunologist best known for his work on T lymphocytes. He is Professor of Molecular Immunology at New York University, an investigator of the Howard Hughes Medical Institute, and a member of the National Academy of Sciences. On October 15, 2012, he was elected as a member of the Institute of Medicine. He became a co-editor of the Annual Review of Immunology in 2013.
