= Emiko Hiyama =

Japanese physicist

Emiko Hiyama (Japanese: 肥山 詠美子) is a Japanese computational nuclear physicist whose research concerns computational methods for few-body systems of nucleons. She is the director of the Strangeness Nuclear Physics Laboratory at the Riken Nishina Center for Accelerator-Based Science, and a professor of physics at Tohoku University.

== Education and career ==
Hiyama is originally from Fukuoka Prefecture, and studied physics at Kyushu University.

She was a researcher for KEK, the Japanese High Energy Accelerator Research Organization, from 2000 to 2004. In 2004, she became an associate professor at Nara Women's University. She moved to Riken in 2008, and became laboratory director there in 2018. From 2017 to 2020 she was also affiliated with the Department of Physics at Kyushu University, and in 2021 she took her present position as a professor at Tohoku University.

== Recognition ==
Hiyama was the 2013 winner of the Saruhashi Prize, for "developing computational methods for precise solutions of quantum $n$-body problems".
