= Keiko Nishikawa =

Japanese physical chemist

Keiko Nishikawa (Japanese: 西川惠子, born 27 November 1948) is a Japanese physical chemist known for her studies of supercritical fluids. She is an emeritus professor at Chiba University and research fellow at the Toyota Physical and Chemical Research Institute.

== Education and career ==
Nishikawa studied chemistry at the University of Tokyo, earning a bachelor's degree in 1972, a master's degree in 1974, and a doctorate in 1981.

She became an assistant professor in the faculty of science at Gakushuin University, and remained there until 1991, when she moved to Yokohama National University as an associate professor in the faculty of education. From 1996 to 2014 she was a professor in the graduate school of national science at Chiba University.

She retired as an emeritus professor in 2014, also retaining a position at Chiba University as research professor from 2014 to 2018. She was inspector general for the Japan Society for the Promotion of Science from 2014 to 2018, and took her present position as fellow at the Toyota Research Institute in 2018.

== Recognition ==
In 1988, Nishikawa won the award of the Crystallographic Society of Japan, and in 1998 she won the Saruhashi Prize. She won the award of the Chemical Society of Japan in 2012, and in the same year was given a commendation by the Ministry of Education, Culture, Sports, Science and Technology. She won the Japanese Medal with Purple Ribbon in 2013. In 2014 she won the award of the Japan Society for Molecular Science.
