= Tomoko M. Nakanishi =

Japanese chemical scientist

- 中西 友子
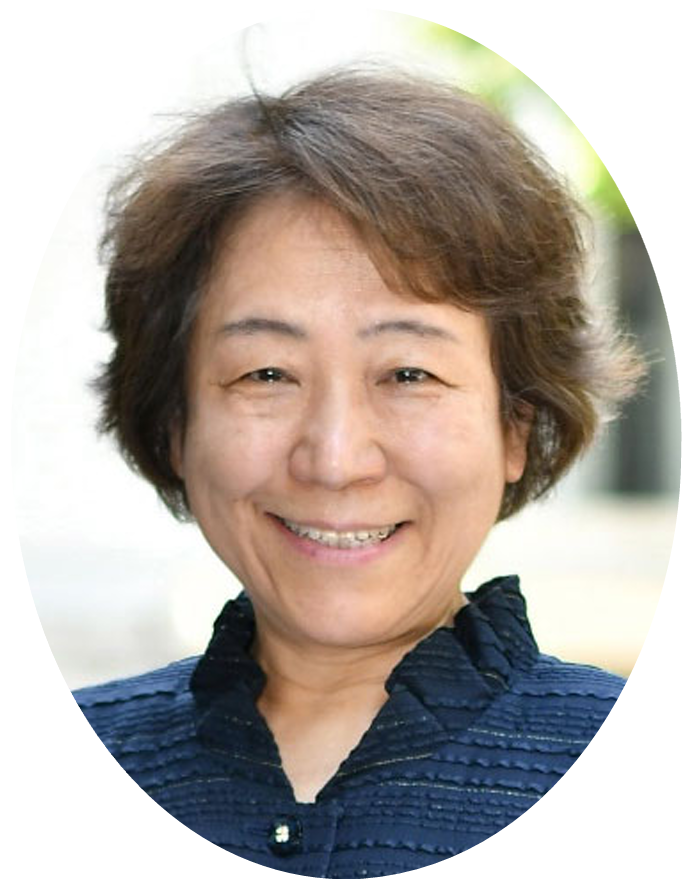
- Tomoko M. Nakanishi
- Born: 27 April 1950 (age 76); Kanazawa, Ishikawa, Japan
- Education: The University of Tokyo
- Awards: Saruhashi Prize (2000); Contribution Award, Japan Atomic Energy Soc. (2001); Soc. Award of Japan Nuclear and Radiochemical Sciences (2010); Ordre national du Mérite (2013); Hevesy Medal Award (2016); Ordre des Palmes académiques (2022); Göteborg Lise Meitner Award (2025)
- Scientific career
- Fields: Plant radio-physiology

Tomoko M. Nakanishi (中西友子) is a Japanese chemical scientist leading in the development and application of imaging techniques using radiation and radionuclides for research on water and element physiology in plants. Her research strategy excels by optimizing a variety of complementary radiochemical/nuclear analytical techniques together with innovative experimental set-ups to get insight in a part of the plant physiology.

== Early life and education ==
Nakanishi was born in 1950 in Kanazawa, Ishikawa, Japan as third child. Her father was a medical doctor in practice. She grew up in Tokyo and graduated high school in 1969 from highschool attached to the Tokyo University of Education when the student movement was at the highest in Japan.

After graduated from St. Paul's university, very close to her house in 1973, she started her research carrier at the University of Tokyo in radiochemistry, supervised by Masatake Honda in 1973. She earned her Ph.D. by determining the half-lives of long lived radioactive nuclides, ^{92}Nb and ^{91}Nb for the first time in 1978.

Then she found her job at Zeon Co., 8 years before the Equal Employment Opportunity Law came into force in Japan. There she had to change her research field to plant physiology to initiate biology group. She could start her plant physiology work in chemical biodynamics lab. at Laurence Berkeley Laboratory, in Univ. of California for about 2 years. She also learned about plant tissue culture work directly from Prof. Toshio Murashige, who was a world premiere plant scientist in Davis, Univ. of California. Back to the company she established plant research laboratory, aiming to collect the fragrance produced from the automatic tissue culture system.

Then she was offered an assistant position in the Agricultural Dept. of the University of Tokyo in 1987. Moving to the university, she had to set up her own environment for the research by herself and utilized the reactor or an accelerator in JAEA (Japan Atomic Energy Agency) and NIRS (National Institute of Radiological Sciences) for plant research.

== Carrier and Research ==
She began to apply radiochemical method for plant physiology, due to lack of any report regarding introduction of various radiochemical methods to plant physiology and to find out how many new activities the living plant showed. Her research is the first to truly combine radiochemistry and plant physiology.

In the case of water, she measured the small amount of water actually moving inside the plant. Using both ^{15}O (half-life: 2 min) and ^{3}H to follow the movement of water, she found the circulation of water in the stem for the first time. She also introduced neutron imaging method for analyzing water in the living plant, where she found there was not direct contact of water on the surface of the root growing in soil, suggesting the root was not absorbing water solution but water vapor. She was also questioned about metal absorption in soil, whether metal solution or metal vapor. To solve these unanswered problem, she stressed the importance of plant research growing in soil, not only in water culture

She has developed the macroscopic and microscopic real-time radioisotope imaging system. She imaged physiological processes in situ using radioisotopes of seventeen elements so far, including the gas movement, how plants fix ^{14}CO_{2} gas and where metabolites go to create new plant tissue.

As tools for studying the essential elements magnesium and potassium, she developed an effective production and separation techniques: alpha bombardment of aluminum followed by radiochemical purification of ^{28}Mg, and milking of ^{42}K from radioactive ^{42}Ar gas, and used these tracers for plant study for the first time.

After the 2011 Tōhoku earthquake, her group has led studies of the agricultural consequences of radioactive contamination from the Fukushima Daiichi Nuclear Power Plant. In addition to numerous publications in the periodical literature and conference proceedings, she has edited four books on this topic, published in 2013, 2016, 2019 and 2023 by Springer. The online version has been accessed more than 213,000, 151, 000, 103,000 and 30,000 times for the first, second, third and fourth book, respectively.

She was appointed as a professor in Graduate School of Agricultural and Life Sciences in the University of Tokyo in 2001. Retired from the University of Tokyo she was appointed as a professor emeritus in 2016. Then she got an offer as a president of Hoshi University in 2019. Retired from Hoshi University she was appointed as a professor emeritus of Hoshi University in 2022. She was offered an Auditor of Fukushima Institute for Research, Education and Innovation in 2022.

Nakanishi was a council member of Science Council of Japan, a commissioner of Japan Atomic Energy Commission, a vice president of Engineering Academy of Japan, a president of The Japan Soc. of Nuclear and Radiochemical Sciences and a commissioner of Japanese National Commission for UNESCO. She is now a vice president of Agricultural Academy of Japan, an Administrative Council of Kyoto University, Board of Trustees Member of Chubu University, etc.

== Awards and honors ==
Nakanishi is a conspicuous and influential role model for Japanese women, having been awarded the Saruhashi Prize in 2000 as the nation's outstanding woman in science. She received Contribution Award from Atomic Energy Society of Japan in 2001, and Society Award of Nuclear and Radiochemical Sciences in Japan in 2010.

Her contributions to science and to society have been recognized internationally, notably by Hevesy Medal Award, selecting one premiere radiochemist every year, named after a Nobel Prize Laurie, Dr. G. Hevesy, in 2016. She was awarded the Ordre national du Mérite in 2013 as well as Ordre des Palmes académiques in 2022 from French government. She was also awarded the Göteborg Lise Meitner Award in 2025 as the first Japanese scientist.

She was elected as a Foreign Member of the Royal Swedish Academy of Engineering in 2015 and the Royal Society of Arts and Sciences in Göteborg in 2017, and an Honorary Doctor of Chalmers University of Technology in 2019.
