= Keiko Torii =

Japanese plant biologist

- Born: 1965 (age 60–61); Tokyo, Japan
- Education: University of Tsukuba (Master of Science); University of Tsukuba (PhD)
- Awards: Saruhashi Prize(2015); Asahi Prize (2021)
- Scientific career
- Fields: Research of Plant development, Stem cell
- Workplaces: University of Texas at Austin; Institute of Transformative Bio-Molecules, Nagoya University
- Website: www.plant-stomata.org ( Keiko Torii Laboratory, University of Texas at Austin )

Keiko Torii (鳥居 啓子, Torii Keiko) is a Japanese plant scientist and academic teaching at the University of Texas at Austin as of September 2019. She was elected to the US National Academy of Sciences in 2024.

== Research ==
Torii researches stem cell maintenance and the cell-to-cell communication required to correctly pattern tissue during development, focusing on stomatal development as a model. Her work on cell-to-cell communication has also focused on the mechanisms that determine organ size and shape in plants. Her achievements include discoveries of key signaling ligands, receptor kinase signaling pathways, and master regulatory transcription factors that specify stomatal patterning and differentiation. Her research and collaborations range from cell-cell signaling in plant development to maintenance of lineage-specific stem cells, influence of extrinsic peptide and chemical signals in cell-fate decisions and patterning, and creation of an artificial ligand–receptor system to manipulate plant developmental signaling. Through her work, she aims to elucidate how functional tissue patterns are generated using cross-disciplinary approaches. Together with organic chemists and molecular structural theoreticians, she is developing artificial and orthogonal ligand-receptor systems with novel activities to understand and manipulate signaling pathways controlling plant development.

== Early life ==
Torii was born in Tokyo, Japan in 1965. She completed her B.S. (1987) and M.S. (1989) degrees in Biochemistry and Biophysics at the Institute of Biological Sciences at University of Tsukuba, Japan. She also obtained a PhD (1993) from the University of Tsukuba, researching seed development in carrots.

== Career ==
She became a tenure-track Assistant Professor at the Department of Biology (formerly Botany), University of Washington in 1999 and Associate Professor in 2005. Then, in 2009, she was promoted to Full Professor at Department of Biology with an affiliate faculty position at the Institute of Stem Cell and Regenerative Medicine, University of Washington. She was also a PRESTO researcher, Japan Science and Technology Agency, Japan (2009–2012). In 2011, she received the title of College of Arts and Sciences Endowed Distinguished Professor of Biology, University of Washington (2011-2019), and has also been an Investigator at the Howard Hughes Medical Institute (2011–present). In September 2019, she has relocated to the University of Texas at Austin, where she is a Professor of Molecular Biosciences and holds the Johnson & Johnson Centennial Chair in Plant Cell Biology. She keeps her position in University of Washington as Affiliate Professor, and, since 2013, she has been an Oversea Principal Investigator and Visiting Professor at the World Premier Research Initiative, Institute of Transformative Biomolecules (WPI-ITbM), Nagoya University, Japan.

She has provided extensive service on editorial and advisory boards and in editorial roles for journals, including Plant Physiology and as Editor-in-chief of The Arabidopsis Book.

== Awards and honors ==
- 2008 – JSPS prize for 'Mechanisms of Stomatal Patterning and Differentiation in Plants'
- 2012 – Fellow of the American Association for the Advancement of Science (AAAS)
- 2015 – Saruhashi Prize
- 2021 – Asahi Prize
- 2023 - Stephen Hales Prize from the American Society of Plant Biologists (ASPB)
- 2024 - Elected International Member of the US National Academy of Sciences

== Publications ==
- Putarjunan, Aarthi; Ruble, Jim; Srivastava, Ashutosh; Zhao, Chunzhao; Rychel, Amanda L.; Hofstetter, Alex K.; Tang, Xiaobo; Zhu, Jian-Kang; Tama, Florence; Zheng, Ning; Torii, Keiko U. (July 2019). "Bipartite anchoring of SCREAM enforces stomatal initiation by coupling MAP kinases to SPEECHLESS". Nature Plants. 5 (7): 742–754. doi:10.1038/s41477-019-0440-x. PMC 6668613. PMID 31235876.
- Perraki, Artemis; DeFalco, Thomas A.; Derbyshire, Paul; Avila, Julian; Séré, David; Sklenar, Jan; Qi, Xingyun; Stransfeld, Lena; Schwessinger, Benjamin; Kadota, Yasuhiro; Macho, Alberto P.; Jiang, Shushu; Couto, Daniel; Torii, Keiko U.; Menke, Frank L. H.; Zipfel, Cyril (September 2018). "Phosphocode-dependent functional dichotomy of a common co-receptor in plant signalling". Nature. 561 (7722): 248–252. Bibcode:2018Natur.561..248P. doi:10.1038/s41586-018-0471-x. PMC 6250601. PMID 30177827.
- Torii, Keiko U.; Hagihara, Shinya; Uchida, Naoyuki; Takahashi, Koji (October 2018). "Harnessing synthetic chemistry to probe and hijack auxin signaling". New Phytologist. 220 (2): 417–424. doi:10.1111/nph.15337. PMID 30088268. S2CID 51935633.
- Fendrych, Matyáš; Akhmanova, Maria; Merrin, Jack; Glanc, Matouš; Hagihara, Shinya; Takahashi, Koji; Uchida, Naoyuki; Torii, Keiko U.; Friml, Jiří (July 2018). "Rapid and reversible root growth inhibition by TIR1 auxin signalling". Nature Plants. 4 (7): 453–459. doi:10.1038/s41477-018-0190-1. PMC 6104345. PMID 29942048.
- Han, Soon-Ki; Qi, Xingyun; Sugihara, Kei; Dang, Jonathan H.; Endo, Takaho A.; Miller, Kristen L.; Kim, Eun-Deok; Miura, Takashi; Torii, Keiko U. (May 2018). "MUTE Directly Orchestrates Cell-State Switch and the Single Symmetric Division to Create Stomata" (PDF). Developmental Cell. 45 (3): 303–315.e5. doi:10.1016/j.devcel.2018.04.010. PMID 29738710.
- Uchida, Naoyuki; Takahashi, Koji; Iwasaki, Rie; Yamada, Ryotaro; Yoshimura, Masahiko; Endo, Takaho A.; Kimura, Seisuke; Zhang, Hua; Nomoto, Mika; Tada, Yasuomi; Kinoshita, Toshinori; Itami, Kenichiro; Hagihara, Shinya; Torii, Keiko U. (March 2018). "Chemical hijacking of auxin signaling with an engineered auxin–TIR1 pair". Nature Chemical Biology. 14 (3): 299–305. doi:10.1038/nchembio.2555. PMC 5812785. PMID 29355850.
- Qi, Xingyun; Torii, Keiko U. (December 2018). "Hormonal and environmental signals guiding stomatal development". BMC Biology. 16 (1): 21. doi:10.1186/s12915-018-0488-5. PMC 5819259. PMID 29463247. S2CID 3389232.
- Qi, Xingyun; Han, Soon-Ki; Dang, Jonathan H; Garrick, Jacqueline M; Ito, Masaki; Hofstetter, Alex K; Torii, Keiko U (7 March 2017). "Autocrine regulation of stomatal differentiation potential by EPF1 and ERECTA-LIKE1 ligand-receptor signaling". eLife. 6 e24102. doi:10.7554/eLife.24102. PMC 5358980. PMID 28266915.
- Ziadi, Asraa; Uchida, Naoyuki; Kato, Hiroe; Hisamatsu, Rina; Sato, Ayato; Hagihara, Shinya; Itami, Kenichiro; Torii, Keiko U. (24 August 2017). "Discovery of synthetic small molecules that enhance the number of stomata: C–H functionalization chemistry for plant biology". Chemical Communications. 53 (69): 9632–9635. doi:10.1039/C7CC04526C. PMID 28809975.
- Hirakawa, Yuki; Shinohara, Hidefumi; Welke, Kai; Irle, Stephan; Matsubayashi, Yoshikatsu; Torii, Keiko U.; Uchida, Naoyuki (6 February 2017). "Cryptic bioactivity capacitated by synthetic hybrid plant peptides". Nature Communications. 8 (1) 14318. Bibcode:2017NatCo...814318H. doi:10.1038/ncomms14318. PMC 5303819. PMID 28165456.
- Tameshige, Toshiaki; Okamoto, Satoshi; Lee, Jin Suk; Aida, Mitsuhiro; Tasaka, Masao; Torii, Keiko U.; Uchida, Naoyuki (September 2016). "A Secreted Peptide and Its Receptors Shape the Auxin Response Pattern and Leaf Margin Morphogenesis". Current Biology. 26 (18): 2478–2485. doi:10.1016/j.cub.2016.07.014. hdl:2237/25199. PMID 27593376. S2CID 3982527.
- Lee, Jin Suk; Hnilova, Marketa; Maes, Michal; Lin, Ya-Chen Lisa; Putarjunan, Aarthi; Han, Soon-Ki; Avila, Julian; Torii, Keiko U. (June 2015). "Competitive binding of antagonistic peptides fine-tunes stomatal patterning". Nature. 522 (7557): 439–443. Bibcode:2015Natur.522..439L. doi:10.1038/nature14561. PMC 4532310. PMID 26083750.
