= Ikue Mori (scientist) =

Japanese scientist

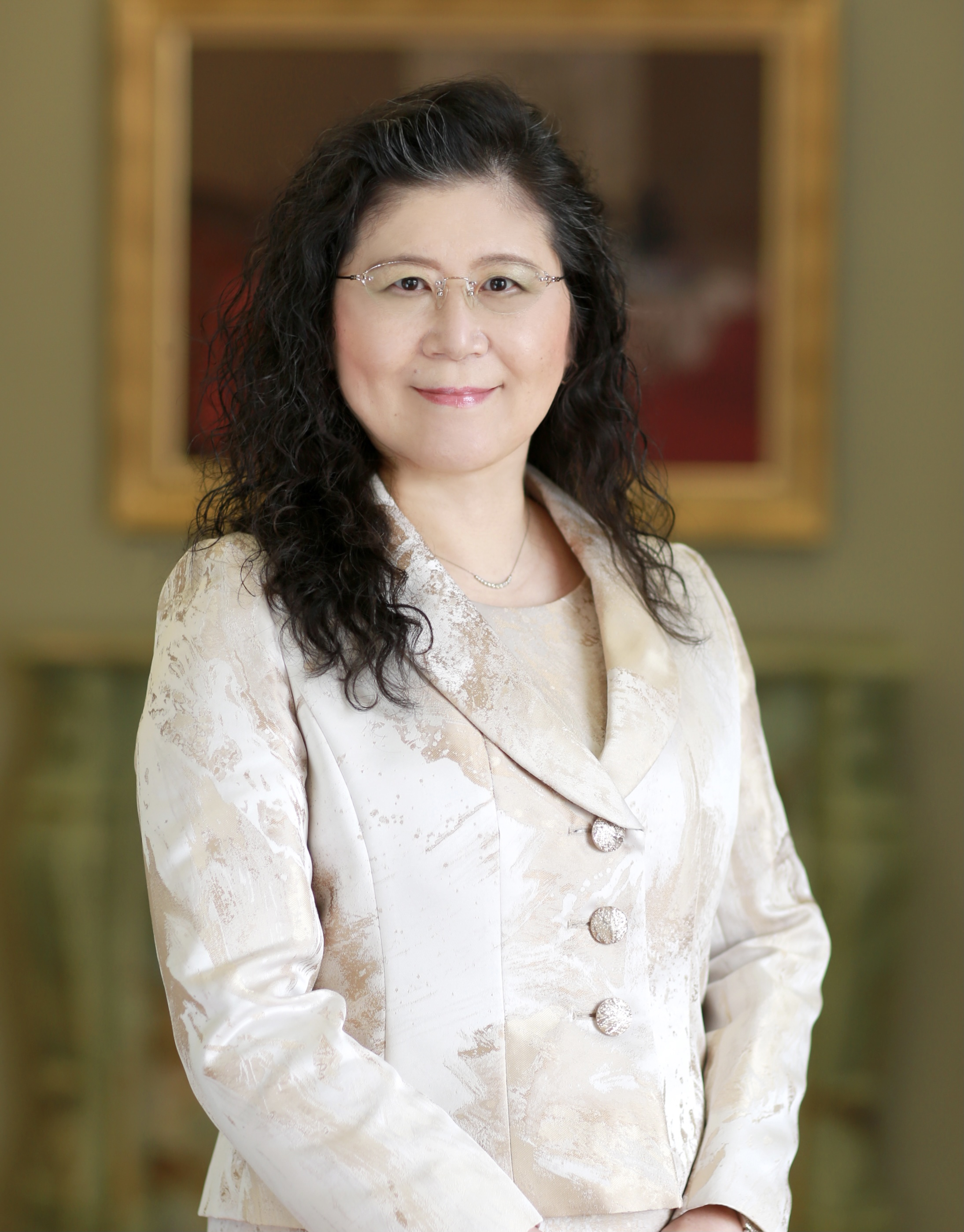
Ikue Mori

Ikue Mori is a Japanese scientist. She is known for her work on molecular, cellular and neural circuit analyses of thermotaxis behavior in C. elegans. She is Director of Neuroscience Institute and Professor of Molecular Neurobiology of the Graduate School of Science in Nagoya University, Japan. In 2013, she became the first woman to receive Tokizane Award, the most prestigious neuroscience award in Japan, and in 2017, was awarded Medal of Honor with Purple Ribbon.

== Early life and education ==
Born in Tokyo (July 8, 1957), she lived in Shizuoka prefecture during her early childhood and spent her life from elementary school to high school in Kanagawa prefecture.

She graduated from Ochanomizu University, Japan, in 1980 with a B.S. in Biology. While she was a M.S. student majoring in population genetics using Drosophila melanogaster in Ochanomizu University, she studied theoretical biology and evolution in University of Sussex, UK, under the supervision of Brian Charlesworth as a visiting student, supported by Ministry of Education, Culture, Sports, Science and Technology of Japan. From April to August in 1983, she was supervised by Kunitada Shimotohno to learn molecular Biology at National Cancer Research Center, Japan.

In September 1983, she joined Biology and Biomedical Science Program in Washington University in St. Louis, where she studied genetics in the nematode Caenorhabditis elegans under the supervision of Robert Waterston.

== Career and research ==
After receiving her PhD, she was appointed as assistant professor in Kyushu University, Japan, where she started to work on thermotaxis in C. elegans, aiming to clarify molecular, neural and circuit mechanisms underlying learning, memory and decision-making.

Since 1998, she established her lab in Nagoya University, Japan, where she was first appointed as associate professor, and Full Professor in 2004. She established Neuroscience Institute, Graduate School of Science in Nagoya University in 2017, and has been acting as the first Director. She is attempting to understand how a behavior is generated and executed using C. elegans as a model by the application of system-level and interdisciplinary approaches.

Ikue Mori is Program Officer of the Interstellar Initiative, which is an international mentorship program for early career investigators organized by Japan Agency for Medical Research and Development (AMED).

== Notable papers ==
- Ikeda M, Nakano S, Giles AC, Xu L, Costa WS, Gottschalk A & Mori I (2020) “Context-dependent operation of neural circuits underlies a navigation behavior in Caenorhabditis elegans” Proc. Natl. Acad. Sci. U.S.A. 117, 6178-6188.
- Kobayashi K, Nakano S, Amano M, Tsuboi D, Nishioka T, Ikeda S, Yokoyama G, Kaibuchi K & Mori I (2016) “Single-Cell Memory Regulates a Neural Circuit for Sensory Behavior” Cell Rep. 14, 11–21. doi: 10.1016/j.celrep.2015.11.064. Open Access
- Sasakura, H., Mori, I. (2013) "Thermosensory Learning in Caenorhabditis elegans" Invertebrate Learning and Memory, Volume 22:124-139 Academic Press
- Sugi T, Nishida Y & Mori I (2011) “Regulation of behavioral plasticity by systemic temperature signaling in Caenorhabditis elegans” Nat. Neurosci. 14, 984–992. doi:10.1038/nn.2854 [PubMed]
- Kuhara A, Okumura M, Kimata T, Tanizawa Y, Takano R, Kimura KD, Inada H, Matsumoto K & Mori I (2008) “Temperature sensing by an olfactory neuron in a circuit controlling behavior of C. elegans” Science 320, 803–807. [PubMed]
- Mori I & Ohshima Y (1995) “Neural regulation of thermotaxis in Caenorhabditis elegans” Nature 376, 344–348.

== Awards and honors ==
1982–1983, Scholarship for studying abroad, Ministry of Education, Culture and Sports, Science and Technology of Japan

1990–1991, Nissan Science Foundation Research fellowship, Brain Science Foundation

1996, The Genetics Society of Japan Scientific Promotion Prize

1996–1999, Researcher of PRESTO, Japan Science and Technology Agency

2006, Saruhashi Prize

2006, Inoue Prize for Science

2013, Tokizane Award

2013, The Kihara Prize

2016, Chunichi Cultural Award

2017, Medal of Honor with Purple Ribbon

2023, Toray Science and Technology Prize
