= Aya Ishihara =

Japanese physicist

Aya Ishihara (Japanese: 石原安野, born 1974) is a Japanese physicist who works as a professor of physics at Chiba University. Her research involves the search for high-energy cosmic neutrinos, including collaboration on the IceCube Neutrino Observatory.

== Education and career ==
Ishihara was born in 1974 in Shizuoka Prefecture. She graduated from the Tokyo University of Science in 1998, and completed her Ph.D. in 2004 at the University of Texas at Austin. She moved to Chiba University after postdoctoral research at the University of Wisconsin involving the IceCube Observatory, and became an associate professor at Chiba University in 2016.

== Recognition ==
Ishihara won the Young Scientist Award of the International Union of Pure and Applied Physics in 2013, the first neutrino astrophysicist to win this award. She was the 2017 winner of the Saruhashi Prize. With Shigeru Yoshida, she won the 2019 Nishina Memorial Prize for their work on high-energy cosmic neutrinos, becoming only the second woman to win this prize. In 2020, Aya Ishihara was a laureate of the Asian Scientist 100 by the Asian Scientist.
