= Kyoko Nozaki =

Japanese chemist

- Born: 9 February 1964 (age 62); Japan
- Education: Kyoto University
- Known for: Macromolecular Chemistry
- Scientific career
- Workplaces: Kyoto University, University of Tokyo
- Doctoral advisor: Kiichiro Utimoto

Kyoko Nozaki (野崎 京子, Nozaki Kyōko; born 9 February 1964) is a Japanese chemist and Professor of Chemistry at University of Tokyo in Japan.

== Education ==
- B.S. 1986 Department of Industrial Chemistry, Faculty of Engineering Kyoto University (Prof.K. Utimoto)
- Ph. D. 1991 from Kyoto University (Directed by Prof.K. Utimoto) Thesis title "Studies on Triethylborane Induced Radical Reactions with Hydrides of Group14 Elements"
- During the PhD study, 1988-1989 exchange student at UC Berkeley (Directed by Prof. C. H.Heathcock) "Studies on the Stereo-control in the Synthesis of Acyclic Compounds"

== Career ==
- 1991–1999 Instructor of Kyoto University
- 1999–2002 Associate Professor of Kyoto University
- 2002–2003 Associate Professor of The University of Tokyo
- 2003– Professor of The University of Tokyo (current position)

== Academic Activity ==
- 1997– International Symposium on Homogeneous Catalysis (ISHC) International Advisory Board
- 2003– Journal of Polymer Science Part A: Polymer Chemistry (Wiley) Editorial Board
- 2003–2006 Dalton Transactions (RSC) International Advisory Board
- 2003– Green Chemistry (RSC) Advisory Board
- 2008–2013 Journal of the American Chemical Society (ACS) Editorial Advisory Board
- 2009–2014 Organometallics (ACS) Editorial Advisory Board
- 2009–2016 ChemCatChem (Wiley) Editorial Board
- 2010– Chemical Science (RSC) Advisory Board
- 2011–2013 Inorganic Chemistry (ACS) Editorial Advisory Board
- 2011–2015 Catalysis Science & Technology (RSC) Advisory Board
- 2014–2021 Angewandte Chemie International Edition (Wiley) International Advisory Board
- 2015– Chemistry Letters (CSJ) Senior Editor
- 2018– Chemical Reviews (ACS) Editorial Advisory Board
- 2018– Macromolecules (ACS) Editorial Advisory Board
- 2018– Chemistry – An Asian Journal (Wiley) International Advisory Board
- 2019– Materials Chemistry Frontiers (RSC) Advisory Board
- 2019– Polymer Chemistry (RSC) Advisory Board

== Research ==
- Organometallics
- Polymerization Catalyst
- Organoboron chemistry
- Synthetic chemistry
- Asymmetric Synthesis Using Chiral Transitionmetal Complexes as Catalysts
- Development of New Organic Transformations Mediated by Organometallic Compounds

== Awards ==
- 2003 OMCOS Prize in organometallic chemistry
- 2004 Wiley Award (the Society of Polymer Science, Japan)
- 2006 Science Award (IBM Japan)
- 2008 Saruhashi Prize
- 2008 Mukaiyama Award (Society of Synthetic Organic Chemistry, Japan)
- 2009 Catalysis Science Award (Mitsui Chemicals)
- 2009 Nagoya Silver Medal
- 2013 Schlenk Lecture Award
- 2021 L'Oréal-UNESCO For Women in Science Award
- 2021 Toray Science and Technology Prize
- 2021 IUPAC Distinguished Women in Chemistry or Chemical Engineering Award
- 2022 Asian Scientist 100, Asian Scientist
