= Saruhashi Prize =

Award for Japanese women scientists

The Saruhashi Prize (猿橋賞) is an annual prize awarded to a Japanese woman researcher in the natural sciences. The prize recognises accomplishments in research as well as the mentoring of other women scientists.

Japanese geochemist Katsuko Saruhashi retired from her position as the director of the Geochemical Research Laboratory in 1980. Her co-workers gifted her ¥5 million and she used the money to establish the Association for the Bright Future of Women Scientists in 1980. The association distributes an annual ¥300,000 prize. It is only available to scientists who are under the age of 50.

The book My Life: Twenty Japanese Women Scientists, edited by Yoshihide Kozai, includes essays by twenty of the Saruhashi Prize winners.

== Recipients ==
	Name	Institution	Year	Research area
1	Tomoko Ohta	National Institute of Genetics	1981	Theoretical study of population genetics at the molecular level
2	Haruka Yamada (ja)	Kwansei Gakuin University	1982	Laser Raman spectroscopy to study surface phenomena
3	Masako Osumi (ja)	Japan Women's University	1983	Microstructure and function of yeast cells
4	Fumiko Yonezawa	Keio University	1984	Theoretical study of physical properties of non-crystalline materials
5	Mariko Yasugi	University of Tsukuba	1985	Methodology for elucidating the logical structure of analysis
6	Yoshie Souma (ja)	National Institute of Advanced Industrial Science and Technology	1986	New organic synthesis catalysts.
7	Izumi Oono	Tokyo Institute of Technology	1987	Fundamental research on electrochemical formation of thin films
8	Chikako Sato (ja)	Aichi Cancer Center Research Institute	1988	The study of mitotic cell death caused by radiation
9	Mizuho Ishida (ja)	Japan Agency for Marine-Earth Science and Technology	1989	Microearthquakes as earthquake precursors and a probe of tectonic plate structure
10	Mihoko Takahashi	University of Tsukuba	1990	Genetic studies of protozoan behaviour
11	Miwako Mori (ja)	Hokkaido University	1991	Development of new reactions for the synthesis of pharmaceuticals
12	Takako Kato (ja)	National Institute for Fusion Science	1992	Atomic processes in high-temperature plasma
13	Reiko Kuroda	University of Tokyo	1993	Mechanism to discriminate the handedness of chiral molecules and DNA base pairs
14	Hiroko Shirai	Okayama University	1994	Research of the mechanism of starfish ovulation and egg maturation
15	Shihoko Ishii	Tokyo Institute of Technology	1995	Research of singularities in algebraic geometry
16	Maki Kawai	RIKEN	1996	Basic research of chemical reactions taking place on solid-state surfaces
17	Tetsuko Takabe (ja)	Nagoya University	1997	The molecular mechanism of salt-tolerance in plants
18	Keiko Nishikawa	Chiba University	1998	Study of supercritical fluid
19	Sumiko Mochida (ja)	Tokyo Medical University	1999	Research of the release mechanism of the neurotransmitter
20	Tomoko M. Nakanishi	University of Tokyo	2000	Behavior of water and trace elements in plants
21	Hiroko Nagahara	University of Tokyo	2001	The formation and evolution of meteorites and planetary materials
22	Chikako Shingyoji (ja)	University of Tokyo	2002	A study on flagellar movement
23	Kiyoko Fukami (ja)	Tokyo University of Pharmacy and Life Sciences	2003	The role of phospholipid metabolism in life phenomena
24	Haruyo Koiso	KEK	2004	Contribution to the world's highest brightness achieved in the collider KEKB
25	Motoko Kotani	Tohoku University	2005	Research of discrete geometric analysis due to the crystal lattice
26	Ikue Mori	Nagoya University	2006	Genetic studies of sensory and learning behaviour
27	Yukari Takayabu	University of Tokyo	2007	Observational study on the dynamics of cloud distribution in the tropics
28	Kyoko Nozaki	University of Tokyo	2008	Study of the precision polymerization of a polar monomer using a metal complex catalyst
29	Mikiko C. Siomi (ja)	Keio University	2009	Mechanism of action of RNA silencing
30	Yoshiko Takahashi (ja)	Nara Institute of Science and Technology	2010	The morphogenesis of animals during embryonic development
31	Noriko Mizoguchi	Tokyo Gakugei University	2011	Asymptotic analysis of blow-up phenomena
32	Ayako Abe	University of Tokyo Atmosphere and Ocean Research Institute	2012	The mechanism of ice sheet fluctuation and the past-to-future climate
33	Emiko Hiyama	RIKEN Nishina Center for Accelerator-Based Science	2013	The establishment of precise calculation algorithms for quantum few-body physics and development thereof
34	Emi Hifumi (ja)		2014	Functional proteins, coined "super catalytic antibodies" (antigenase)
35	Keiko Torii	Institute of Transformative Bio-Molecules, Nagoya University	2015	Research of mechanism of cell-cell communication and stomatal development in plants
36	Tamaki Sato (ja)	Astronomy and Earth Sciences, Tokyo Gakugei University	2016	Description and Systematics of the Mesozoic Reptiles
37	Aya Ishihara	Hadron Space Science, Chiba University	2017	Research of ultra-high-energy cosmic neutrinos
38	Toshiko Terakawa (ja)	Earthquake and Volcano Research Center, Graduate School of Environmental Studies, Nagoya University	2018	Study on crustal stress and pore fluid pressure governing seismicity
39	Rie Umetsu (ja)	Institute for Materials Research, Tohoku University	2019	The physical properties of the Heusler-type functional magnetic materials including the half-metal-type magnets
40	Atsuko Ichikawa (ja)	Department of Physics, Kyoto University	2020	Unraveling the nature of neutrino by accelerator-based long baseline neutrino experiment
41	Mikiko Tanaka (ja)	Department of Life Science and Technology, Tokyo Institute of Technology	2021	Research on the development and evolution of vertebrate limbs
42	Kimiko Sekiguchi (ja)	Department of Physics, Tokyo Institute of Technology	2022	Experimental study of three-body nuclear force in nuclear physics
43	Hiroko Miyahara (ja)	Musashino Art University	2023	Mechanisms of solar activity variations and their impacts on climate
44	Yoshiko Ogata	Research Institute for Mathematical Sciences, Kyoto University	2024	Mathematical Studies of Quantum Many-Body Systems
45	Azusa Kamikouchi (ja)	Graduate School of Science, Nagoya University	2025	Auditory processing mechanisms in the insect brain
46	Yukiko Imada (ja)	Atmosphere and Ocean Research Institute, The University of Tokyo	2026	Attribution Studies of Extreme Events from a Climate Perspective

== See also ==
- List of general science and technology awards
