= Guo Mei =

Hematologist

Guo Mei (Chinese: 郭梅; pinyin: Guō Méi, born January, 1968) is a Chinese physician and hematologist as well as one of the founders of microtransplantation. Guo is associate director of 307th Hospital of Chinese People’s Liberation Army and deputy director of Radiation Research Institute.

== Career ==
Guo graduated from Academy of Military Medical Sciences and earned a master degree in 1997. She is an expert in the use of hematopoietic stem cell transplantation for treating radiation injuries and blood disease, especially leukemia, aplastic anemia and myelodysplastic syndrome. She worked with Huisheng Ai on microtransplantation.

== Research ==
1998 Dr. Guo and her medical team developed "Study of HLA-matched nonmyeloablative transplantation in the treatment of hematological malignancies" successfully.

2004 The study of HLA haploidentical blood related and unrelated matched donors nonmyeloablative transplantation for the treatment of blood diseases.

2005 Treatment of Jining serious radiation accidents and extremely severe bone marrow and intestinal radiation

2006 Developed an original creativity of microtransplantation for the treatment of leukemia, which opens up new opportunities for treating leukemia in world.

From 2010 to 2015, she took part in 12 projects of national 863 and provincial projects. As the first applicants, she took five scientific research projects, including the National Ministry of science and Technology Department project, National 11th Five-Year Plan key project of scientific and technological and National 12th Five-Year Plan key project of scientific and technological.

== Honours ==
- First prize of military medical achievement award in June 2005
- Military medical achievement award in March 2006
- Second prize of military medical achievement award in September 2007
- Honourable title of the 3rd merit in 2008

Her accomplishments include over 100 published research articles, including four articles that have been recorded by SCI (JCO: 18.4, Blood: 10.55, BBMT 3.86) aplastic anemia and myelodysplastic syndrome. She has co-authored five monographs, including "Hematopoietic stem cell transplantation clinical and basic," "Modern leukemia study," "Clinical and basic research of radiation sickness," and two more books.

== Recent academic papers ==
- 2015 "Efficacy of Switching to 2nd Generation of Tyrosine Kinase Inhibitor on CML Patients at Poor Responses to Imatinib"
- 2014 "Comparison of conditioning regimens containing or no fludarabine in nonmyeloablative allogeneic peripheral blood stem cell transplantation"
- 2014 The Existence and Role of Microchimerism after Microtransplantion
- 2014 Malposition of peripherally inserted central catheter: experience from 3012 cancer patients
- 2014 Establishment and identification of a h-2 completely mismatched microtransplantation model of leukemia mouse
- 2014 Risk factors analysis of cytomegalovirus infection after nonmyeloablative allogeneic peripheral blood stem cell transplantation
- 2014 Severe acute radiation syndrome: treatment of a lethally 60Co-source irradiated accident victim in China with HLA-mismatched peripheral blood stem cell transplantation and mesenchymal stem cells
