= Ralf Steudel =

German chemist (1937–2021)

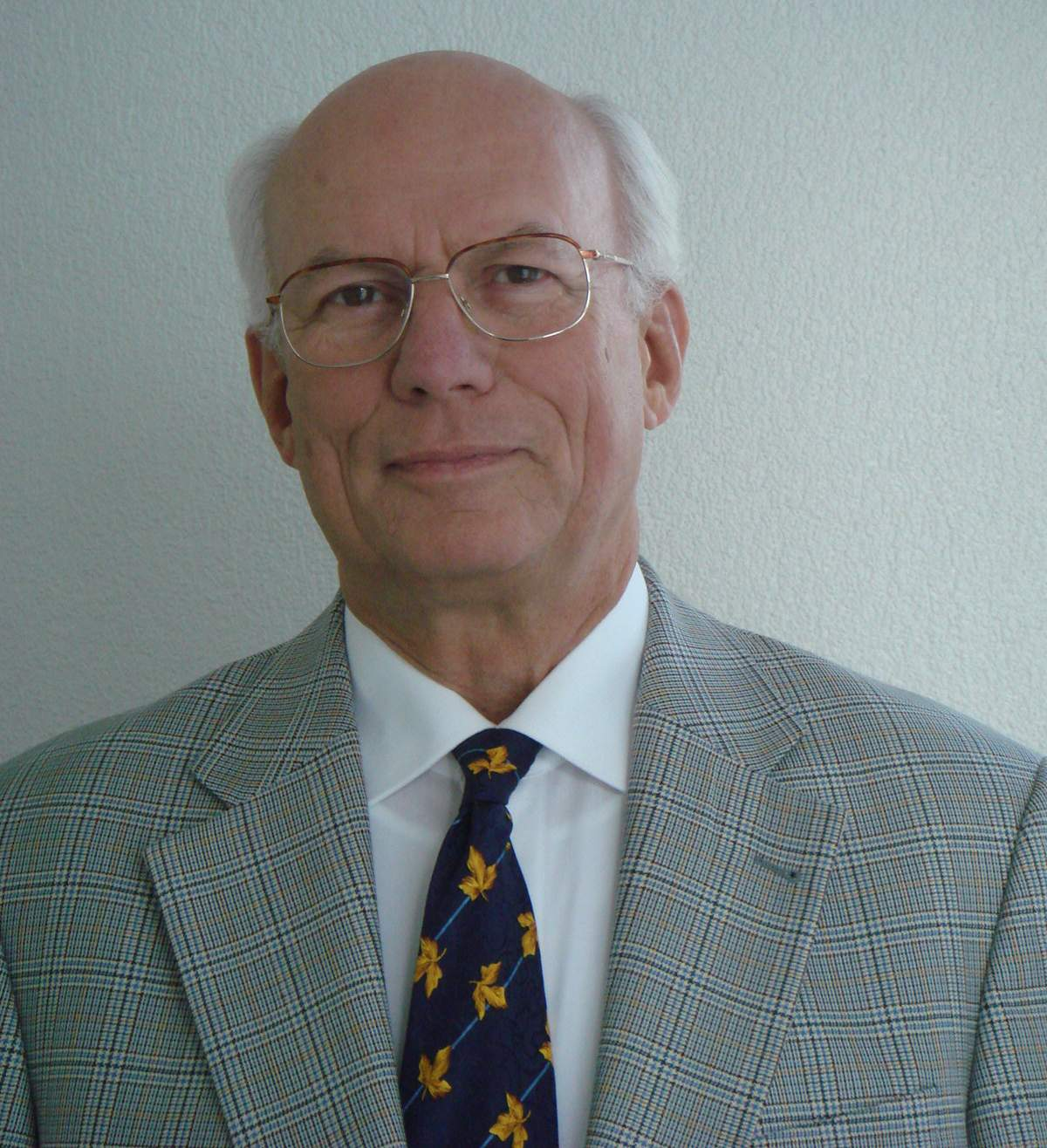
- Ralf Steudel
- Born: 25 March 1937; Dresden, Germany
- Died: 12 February 2021 (aged 83); Berlin, Germany
- Education: Free University of Berlin; Technische Universität Berlin
- Known for: Sulfur chemistry
- Awards: Karl Winnacker Grant (1974–1978); Prize of the Japan Society for the Promotion of Science (2002)
- Scientific career
- Workplaces: Technische Universität Berlin
- Doctoral advisor: Peter W. Schenk

Ralf Steudel (25 March 1937 – 12 February 2021) was a German chemist and university professor who was known for his research in the area of sulfur chemistry as well as for his textbook Chemistry of the Non-Metals, which appeared in several languages and many editions. Complementing his pioneering contributions to polysulfides, he authored many reviews on the subject.

Steudel was born to a family of entrepreneurs in the Saxonian town of Kamenz. In 1954 he escaped to West Berlin, and started his university studies in chemistry in 1957 at the Free University Berlin under the supervision of Peter Wolfgang Schenk, whose research focused on sulfur monoxide and related chalcogen compounds. Steudel graduated in 1963. In 1965, he received his PhD in chemistry at Technische Universität Berlin (TU Berlin) where he subsequently made his habilitation work resulting in the venia legendi for inorganic chemistry in 1969. In the same year he was appointed professor of inorganic chemistry at TU Berlin, a position he held until his retirement in 2003. In 1973/74 he spent 1 year as a visiting professor at the Spectroscopy Laboratory of the Massachusetts Institute of Technology (MIT) in Cambridge, Massachusetts.

Steudel died on 12 February 2021, at the age of 83.

== Research ==
Steudel made many contributions to the chemistry of sulfur. His group prepared several new allotropes, often using titanocene pentasulfide. Two examples are S_{11} and S_{13}, which resulted from the titanocene reagent and S_{6}Cl_{2} and S_{8}Cl_{2}, respectively. He also discovered routes to the lower sulfur oxides. One example is S_{8}O. Much of his work benefited from the use of high performance liquid chromatography (HPLC) to analyze reaction and to assess purity. Using HPLC, he established the existence of rings up to S_{18} and beyond.

== Publications (textbooks) ==
- (with D. Scheschkewitz): Chemistry of the Non-Metals, 2nd ed., Berlin; Boston, Mass.: de Gruyter, 2019, 760 pages, ISBN 978-3-11-057805-8.
- (ed.): Anorganische Chemie: Prinzipien von Struktur und Reaktivität, Authors: James E. Huheey, Ellen A. Keiter, Richard L. Keiter, 5th Edition, Berlin; Boston, Mass.: de Gruyter, 2014, ISBN 978-3-11-030433-6.
