= Toho University =

Private university in Tokyo, Japan

Coordinates: 35°34′15.7″N 139°43′30.1″E

- 東邦大学
- Motto: Nature, life, mankind
- Type: Private
- Established: 1925
- Chancellor: Tsugunori Aoki
- Academic staff: 705 (2005)
- Administrative staff: 3,365 (2005)
- Students: 4,533 (2005)
- Undergraduates: 4,079 (2005)
- Postgraduates: 454 (2005)
- Doctoral students: 154 (2005)
- Address: 5-21-16 Ōmorinishi, Ota-ku, Tokyo 143-8540, Japan, Ōta, Tokyo, Japan
- Campus: Urban
- Website: www.toho-u.ac.jp/english/index.html

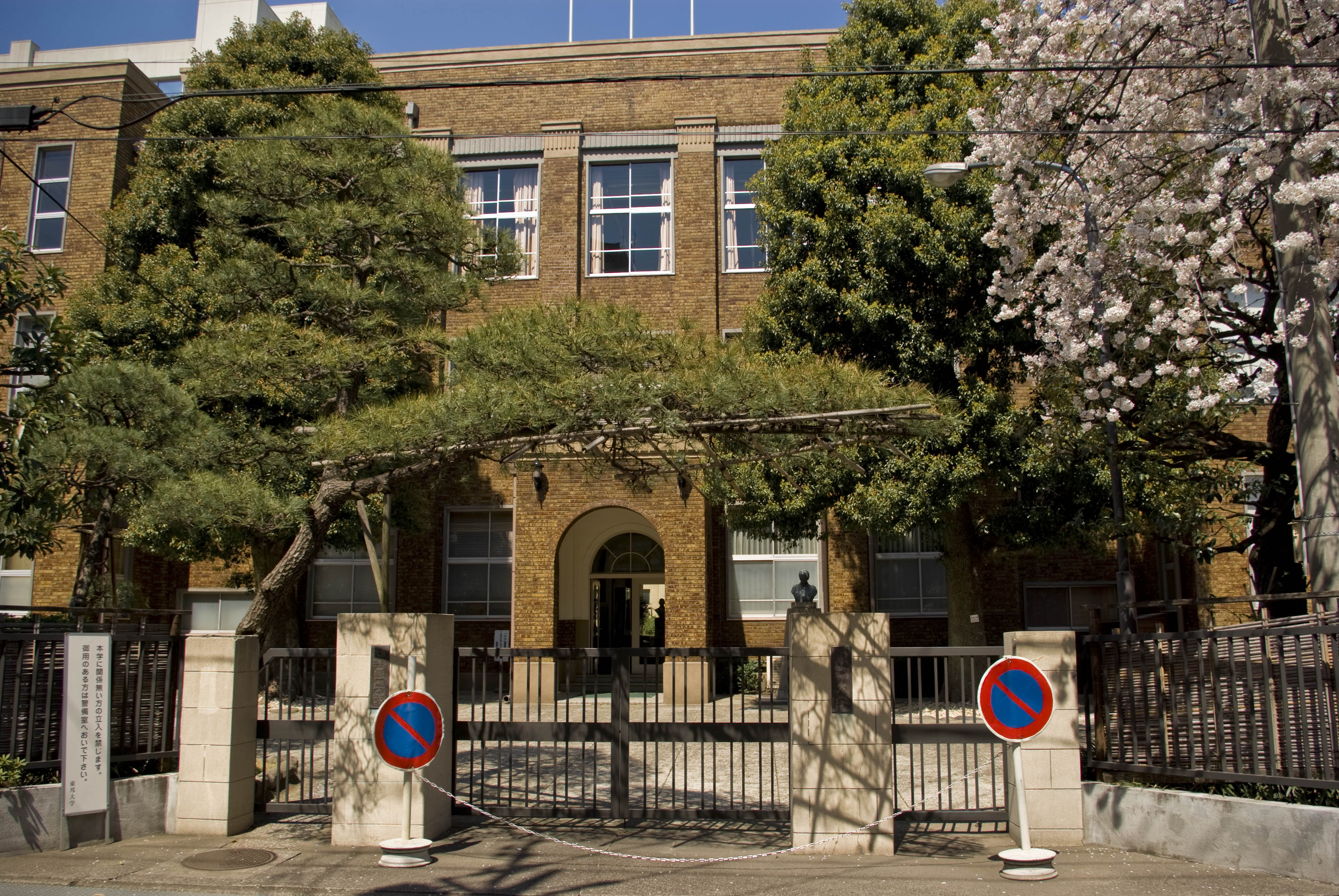
Toho University

Toho University (東邦大学, Tōhō Daigaku) is a university in Ōta, Tokyo, Japan.

== History ==
The two brothers Yutaka Nukada and Susumu Nukada founded the Imperial Women's Medical College in Ōmori, Tokyo, the location of the present-day Faculty of Medicine, with their own money in 1925 and then established the Imperial Women's Medical and Pharmaceutical College and the Imperial Women's College of Science. They aimed at improving scientific education for women in such fields as medicine, pharmaceutical sciences, and science. After World War II the Faculty of Pharmaceutical Sciences and the Faculty of Science moved to Funabashi, Chiba. With the reform of the Japanese school system in 1950, Toho University became a coeducational institution, focusing on natural sciences, with Faculties of Medicine, Pharmaceutical Sciences and Science.

== Notable people ==
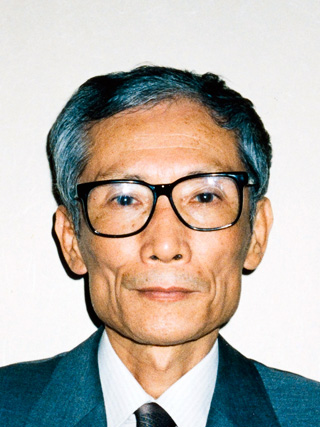
Jun Kondō, former professor, theoretical physicist, Nobel Prize nominee.
