= Journal of Radiation Research =

- Discipline: Radiobiology
- Language: English
- Edited by: Kenshi Komatsu

Publication details
- Former name(s): Journal of JASTRO (absorbed 1998)
- History: 1960–present
- Publisher: Oxford University Press
- Frequency: Bimonthly
- Open access: Yes
- License: Creative Commons Attribution License 4.0 International
- Impact factor: 1.95 (2019)

Standard abbreviations
- ISO 4: J. Radiat. Res.

Indexing
- CODEN: JRARAX
- ISSN: 0449-3060 (print); 1349-9157 (web)
- OCLC no.: 01783177

Links
- Journal homepage; Online access; Online archive

The Journal of Radiation Research is a bimonthly peer-reviewed scientific journal covering research on radiation and oncology. It was established in 1960 and is published by Oxford University Press. Its editor-in-chief is Kenshi Komatsu (University of Kyoto).

It is an affiliated journal of the Japan Radiation Research Society and the Japanese Society for Radiation Oncology. In 1998 the journal absorbed the Japanese Society for Radiation Oncology's former title, the Journal of JASTRO. This extended the scope of the journal to include medical and oncology research.

== Abstracting and indexing ==
The journal is abstracted and indexed in:

- Chemical Abstracts Service
- Index Medicus/MEDLINE/PubMed
- Science Citation Index Expanded
- Current Contents/Life Sciences
- BIOSIS Previews
- Scopus

According to the Journal Citation Reports, the journal has a 2019 impact factor of 2.014. 5 year Impact Factor 2.063
