= Fumiko Yonezawa =

Japanese theoretical physicist (1938–2019)

Fumiko Yonezawa 米沢 富美子
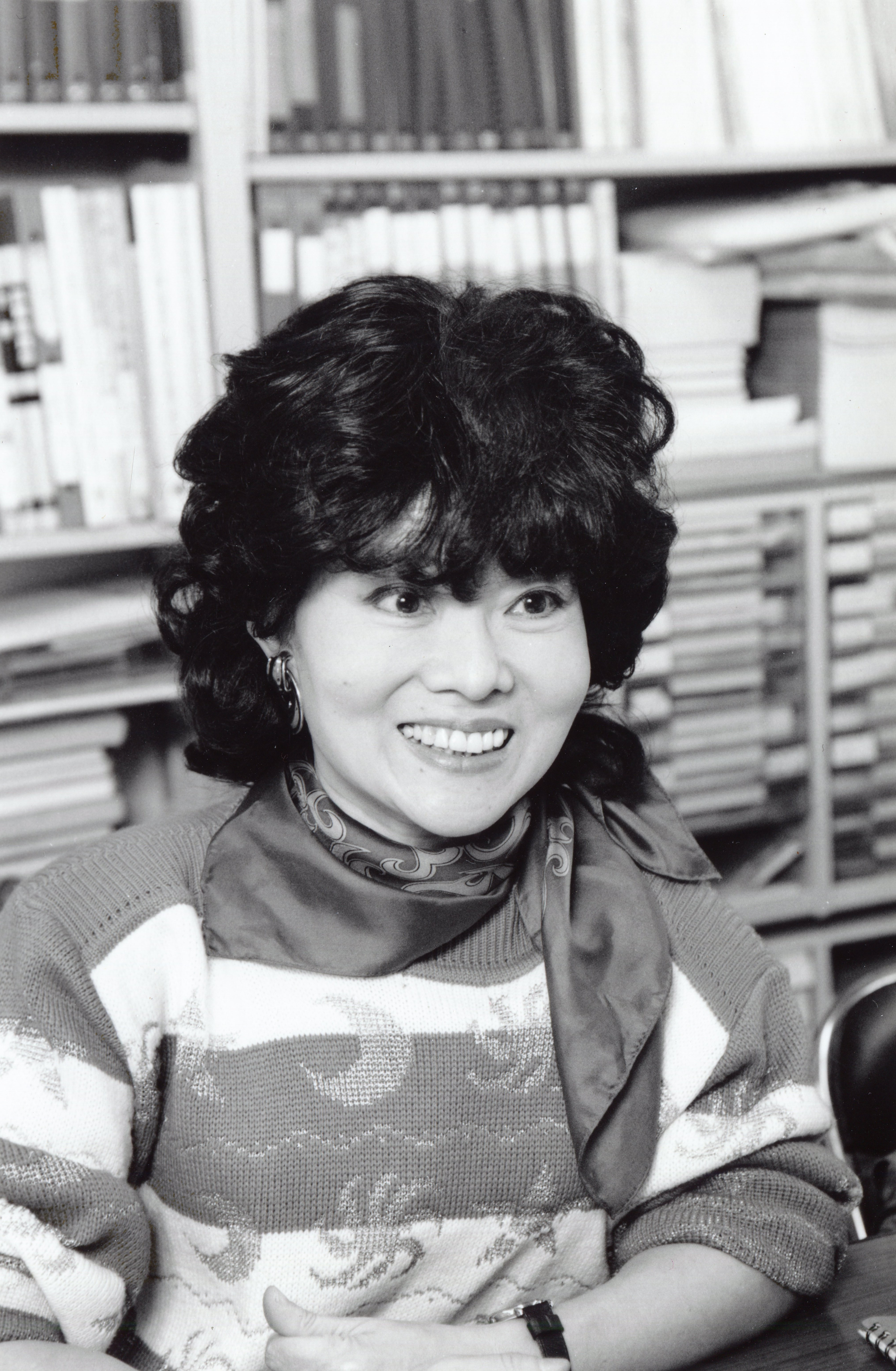
- Yonezawa in November 1995
- Born: 19 October 1938; Suita, Osaka, Empire of Japan (Now Japan)
- Died: 17 January 2019 (aged 80); Shinagawa, Tokyo, Japan
- Education: Kyoto University, BSc, MSc and PhD
- Spouse: Masaharu Yonezawa (m. 1962; died 1996)
- Children: 3 daughters
- Awards: Saruhashi Prize; L'Oréal-UNESCO For Women in Science Awards
- Scientific career
- Workplaces: Kyoto University; Tokyo Institute of Technology; Keele University; Keio University
- Academic advisors: Roy McWeeny; Joel Lebowitz; Hideki Yukawa; Takeo Matsubara

Fumiko Yonezawa (Japanese: 米沢 富美子; 19 October 1938 – 17 January 2019) was a Japanese theoretical physicist. She was the first woman to be appointed as the President of the Physical Society of Japan and the first Japanese student to have studied at Keele University in Staffordshire, United Kingdom. She was one of the founding members of the Department of Physics at the Faculty of Science and Technology, Keio University, Japan. Her research covered semi-conductors and liquid metals. She led a group of scientists and pioneered in visualising computer simulation.

== Early life and education ==
Fumiko Yonezawa was born on 19 October 1938 in Suita-city, Osaka, Japan. Her father died in New Guinea battle during Second World War when she was 5; and her mother, Toshiko, who became the main breadwinner of her family, supporting two young children, Fumiko and her baby sister, and her grandmother.

Yonezawa graduated from Ibaraki High School in Osaka, and went on to obtain BSc, MSc and Ph.D from Kyoto University, and spent a year researching under Professor Roy McWeeny at Keele University in the Staffordshire, United Kingdom during her doctoral studies.

== Academic career ==
Yonezawa spent her early career in Kyoto and Tokyo where she published her work on Coherent Potential Approximation (CPA).

In 1972, her family moved to Northeast region in the United States when her husband was assigned to a New York office. Yonezawa took research jobs at Yeshiva University and Center of the City University of New York.

After her family moved back to Japan in 1976, Yonezawa was appointed Associate Professor at the Yukawa Institute of Theoretical Physics at Kyoto University. In 1981, she was invited to join the founding faculty of the newly established Department of Physics at the Faculty of Science and Technology, Keio University and was made Professor of Physics in 1983.

She led a group of scientists at Keio University, simulating amorphous structures using computers and then creating visualizations of them.

She was made the President of the Physics Society of Japan in 1996, the first woman to hold the position.

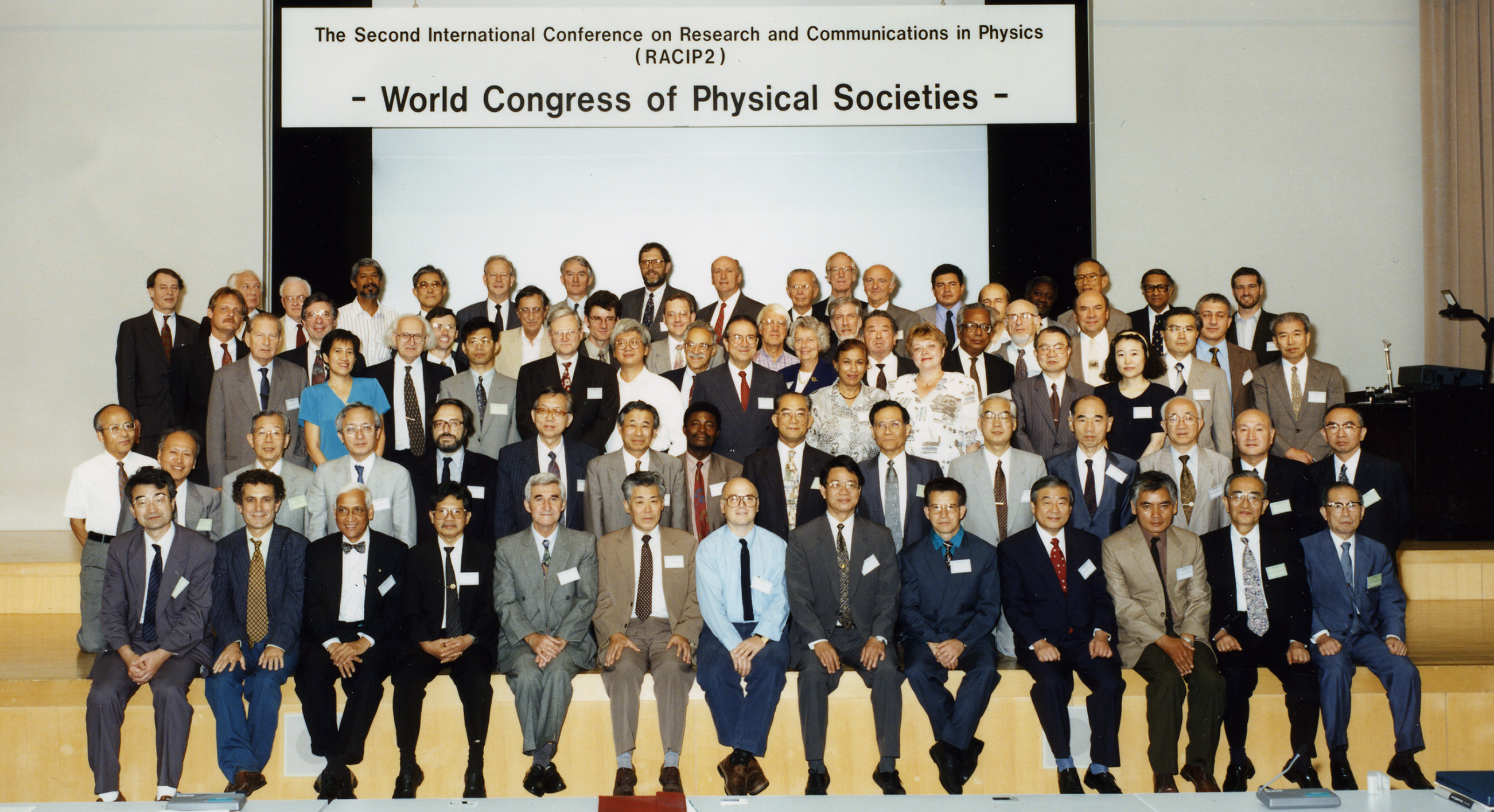
Yonezawa at the Second International Conference on Research and Communications in Physics

In 2004, Yonezawa retired from Keio University, where she was professor emerita.

== Recognitions ==
Yonezawa has received many recognition and awards for her contribution to Physics, including in 1984 awarded the Saruhashi Prize and in 2005 awarded L'Oréal-UNESCO Award for Women in Science for "pioneering theory and computer simulations on amorphous semiconductors and liquid metals."

== Personal life ==
Yonezawa married Masaharu Yonezawa (1936–1996), an economics graduate whom she met at Kyoto University. They had three daughters. In 1963, a year after they married, Masaharu was assigned by his employer to study at London School of Economics and Political Science. The company policy didn't allow spouses to accompany them, so Fumiko visited the British Council in Kyoto and wrote a letter to 30 vice-chancellors of universities in the UK asking for a scholarship to study in graduate school. Two universities responded to her letter. Fumiko chose to study at Keele University in Staffordshire. This allowed the couple to meet every weekend during their British studies.

Her husband, Masaharu died of a brief illness in 1996, at the age of 60.

== Health problems and death ==
In 1984, Yonezawa survived breast cancer. In April 2018, she also survived cerebral infarction, although she had briefly recovered from her serious illness.

Yonezawa died of congestive heart failure at her home in Tokyo on 17 January 2019, at the age of 80.

== Legacy ==
- The Physical Society of Japan created Fumiko Yonezawa Memorial Prize to award female society members each year for their contribution to Physics.
- In 1995, Suita-City created Fumiko Yonezawa Children's Science Award. Yonezawa served as one of the selection committee until her death. The award still continues each year to inspire many young minds into science.
- Following her death, Keio University set up a Fumiko Yonezawa Award for female scientists.
- In 2023, Keele University unveiled a plaque in memory of their first Japanese student.

== Selected publications ==
- Yonezawa, Fumiko; Morigaki, Kazuo (1973). "Coherent Potential Approximation". Progress of Theoretical Physics Supplement. 53: 1–76. Bibcode:1973PThPS..53....1Y. doi:10.1143/PTPS.53.1.
- Nosé, Shuichi; Yonezawa, Fumiko (1986). "Isothermal–isobaric computer simulations of melting and crystallization of a Lennard-Jones system". The Journal of Chemical Physics. 84 (3): 1803. Bibcode:1986JChPh..84.1803N. doi:10.1063/1.450427.
- Yonezawa, F. (1 October 1968). "A Systematic Approach to the Problems of Random Lattices. I: A Self-Contained First-Order Approximation Taking into Account the Exclusion Effect". Progress of Theoretical Physics. 40 (4): 734–757. Bibcode:1968PThPh..40..734Y. doi:10.1143/PTP.40.734.
- Yonezawa, Fumiko; Matsubara, Takeo (March 1966). "Note on Electronic State of Random Lattice. II". Progress of Theoretical Physics. 35 (3): 357–379. Bibcode:1966PThPh..35..357Y. doi:10.1143/PTP.35.357.
