= 307 Hospital =

- People's Liberation Army

Geography
- Location: China
- Coordinates: 23.455630°N 120.443810°E

The 307th Hospital of the Chinese People's Liberation Army, commonly called the 307 Hospital (Chinese: 307医院), is a hospital in China. It is in Fengtai District, Beijing. The hospital combines medical treatment, research, and educational studies into a comprehensive hospital, which is one of the first designated medical institutions with medical insurance coverage in Beijing. 307 Hospital of PLA is appointed as the National Clinical Hospital of Disease Control.

== History ==
The hospital was formerly the Isotope Hospital of Ministry of Health, founded in Haidian District Beijing in 1957. In 1958, the hospital had transferred to the People's Liberation Army and renamed 307 Hospital of PLA.

In September 1981, 307 Hospital of PLA started to use the name of the Affiliated Hospital of Military Medical Sciences. At the same time, it also uses the name of 307 Hospital of PLA.

In June 1983, 307 Hospital of PLA became a division-level hospital.

In September 2005, the whole hospital was moved to Fengtai District from Haidian District.

In 2012, 307 Hospital of PLA was awarded as a class 1, Grade 3 general hospital.

== Medical facilities ==
The hospital has over 1500 beds and 48 medical departments, such as hematology, ophthalmology, traditional Chinese medicine, etc. The radiology department provides medical service to over 20,000 patients annually.

== Notable doctors ==
Hematology department: Huisheng Ai, Guo Mei, Changlin Yu, Jianhui Qiao, etc.

HSCT (Hematopoietic Stem Cell Transplantation) department: Chen Hu, Liangding Hu, etc.

Neurosurgery: Duan Lian, Weijian Sun, Shubin Liu, Huang Yan, etc.

== See also ==
- 301 Hospital
