= Mark Dodgson =

Australian academic and author

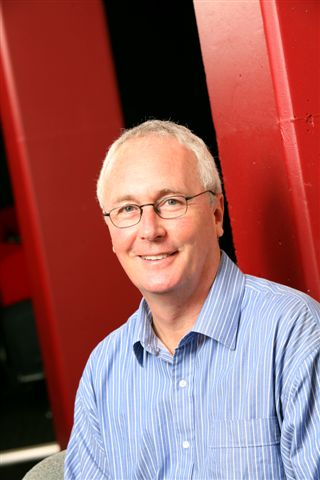
Mark Dodgson

Mark Jonathan Dodgson AO (born 1 May 1957) is an Australian academic and author. His research on the innovation process has influenced innovation management and policy worldwide.

== Biography ==
Born in Norwich, UK, he grew up in Wales and Uganda, where his father was pilot to Presidents Milton Obote and Idi Amin. He is the brother of author, Philip Pullman. After a number of years working as a lorry driver and drayman in London, Dodgson completed his PhD in two years at Imperial College London and worked at the Science Policy Research Unit at University of Sussex for eight years. During this period he developed expertise in technology and innovation management and policy in Europe. In 1993 he moved with his family to Australia where he became professor and executive director of the national graduate school of management at the Australian National University. For the next ten years he developed expertise in technology and innovation management and policy throughout Asia. In 2003 he moved to become director of the Technology and Innovation Management Centre at the University of Queensland, and he is currently emeritus professor at the University of Queensland, visiting Professor at U-GOT KIES - University of Gothenburg, and executive-in-residence at the Säid Business School, University of Oxford. He continues to advise governments and major corporations around the world on innovation, and has worked in over 60 countries. Dodgson is the author of several key texts in the Management of Technological Innovation. He was awarded the Eureka Prize for Leadership in Business Innovation in 2007. He has been director of the Think, Play, Do Group; non-executive director of Nestle Australia Ltd; and a member of the advisory board of Thiess Pty Ltd and Evidn Pty Ltd. From 2017 to 2019 he was director of the Oxford Centre for the Study of Philanthropy. In 2019 he was appointed an Officer of the Order of Australia (AO).

== Views on innovation ==
Dodgson argues innovation management and policy depends on a comprehensive understanding of the innovation process and the ways it is changing. His early contributions on technology strategy identified the importance of focus and flexibility in technology investments and use. He conducted one of the first comprehensive studies of the emerging phenomenon of biotechnology firms by writing the history of the UK's pioneering company, Celltech. As a result, he identified the importance of organizational and technological learning, and published a book in 1991 – The Management of Technological Learning – on Celltech, and several highly cited articles in the journals Organization Studies and Human Relations.

== Early research ==
His research in the early 1990s led him to write one of the first books on how technology was developed collaboratively, between firms and between firms and research organizations. He identified the consequences of increased collaboration for managers and policy-makers in his 1993 book, Technological Collaboration in Industry. With Roy Rothwell, Dodgson edited one of the first comprehensive collections of writing on innovation in his Handbook of Industrial Innovation in 1994.

== The influence of technology ==
Dodgson became increasing convinced about the way technology was itself changing the innovation process. With colleagues David Gann and Ammon Salter at Imperial College London, he identified the emerging role of ‘innovation technology’ – a basket of technologies used to increase the speed and efficiency of innovation. Innovation technologies include eScience; modelling, simulation and visualization tools, artificial intelligence, and rapid and virtual prototyping. The technologies were used in an innovation process typified as one involving ‘thinking’, ‘playing’ and ‘doing’. The book that resulted from this work – Think, Play, Do: Technology, Innovation and Organization – was the first to identify the role of play around emerging technologies to encourage innovation. Play includes experimenting, tinkering, and prototyping with new ideas. Studies of the impact of technology on innovation include virtual reality in IBM, the use of simulation technology in fire engineering, complex systems in cities, and in major infrastructure, including Heathrow Terminal 5 and Crossrail.

== Innovation policy ==
His research on the innovation process has informed government policies in Europe, Asia and Latin America. His 1996 book with John Bessant – Effective Innovation Policy – identified the importance of intermediary organizations building bridges between business and the research base in nations. He has written on innovation policy in China and Taiwan, and in East Asia generally. Dodgson has advised the Australian Government on its innovation policy since 1987, and was research director of the 2008 Review of Australia's National Innovation System. With John Foster, Alan Hughes and Stan Metcalfe, he wrote an influential article on Australia's National Innovation System.

== Recent work ==
Dodgson is author, with David Gann, of Innovation: A Very Short Introduction for Oxford University Press, now in its second edition, and translated into numerous languages. He continues his research on play, writing about playful work. In 2018, with David Gann, he published The Playful Entrepreneur: How to Adapt and Thrive in an Uncertain Times for Yale University Press. He argues that as well as play being an important stimulus to creativity and innovation in organisations, it is a core behaviour of entrepreneurs. He has also published on innovation and philanthropy, the new challenges confronting universities, the consumption of innovation, digital money, innovation in professional services firms, and the life of Josiah Wedgwood (1730–1795). His recent book on innovation in China, with Marina Zhang and David Gann, analyses the remarkable strengths of China's innovation system, in supply chains, super platform firms, and digital awareness and skills in the population, but also refers to the challenges the country needs to confront if it is to continue its innovation trajectory. In 2023 he completed a year-long study of the development of the Oxford University/AstraZeneca COVID-19 vaccine. In 2026 he published a book with David Gann on the search for viable fusion energy, arguing that it could provide an important source of reliable and sustainable energy, and that the speed of its development will depend on the level of resources invested in it and the effectiveness of its surrounding innovation ecosystem.
