= Villars Institute =

International charitable organization located in the Swiss Alps

- Founders: Julia Marton-Lefèvre; David Gann
- Type: NGO, NPO
- Purpose: Sustainability, International Development, Net Zero
- Headquarters: Swiss Alps
- Origins: Villars-Sur-Ollon
- Method: Community Development, Research, Data Analysis
- Board Chair: Julia Marton-Lefèvre
- Key people: David Gann, Lee Howell, Keith Tuffley, Suzan Craig, Richard McDonald, Robert Swan, Jade Hameister
- Website: https://villarsinstitute.org/

Villars Institute is an international non-profit foundation and non-governmental organization (NGO) located in the Swiss Alps in Villars-sur-Ollon, Switzerland.

The nonprofit acts primarily as a community development organization with a focus on sustainability, systemic change, and the prevention of biodiversity loss. It actively promotes systems thinking as a key approach in achieving its goals. The foundation organizes events and sponsors experts, scientists and young adults globally to attend its conferences in Villars-sur-Ollon.

The organization also sponsors musicians and filmmakers and collaborates with other nonprofits and universities. They state that interdisciplinary problems require inter-generational solutions.

== History ==
=== Founding ===
The NGO is an independent charitable foundation supervised by the Swiss Federal Supervisory Authority for Foundations (ESA). Villars Institute was founded by all of the board members and the executive director, Lee Howell, on January 15, 2022. Julia Marton Lefevre and David Gann were elected as the chair and vice-chair at that installation meeting.

In June 2022, they held the first Villars Symposium. In March, 2022, the group held the first Villars Institute Summit in conjunction with the World Economic Forum.

==== Board members ====
- Julia Marton-Lefèvre Co-founder and Chair of Villars Institute. She is the former Director General of the International Union for the Conservation of Nature in Switzerland and former Rector of the United Nations affiliated University for Peace in Costa Rica. Julia Marton-Lefevre is an active participant in the climatology and ecology communities, and worked with young adults at the symposium in 2022 and 2023.
- David Gann, co-founder and Trustee - Chairman of the UK Atomic Energy Authority, Pro-Vice-Chancellor for Development and External Affairs at Oxford University, Professor of Innovation and Entrepreneurship at Saïd Business School, and a Fellow of Magdalen College.
- Keith Tuffley, Director - Global Co-Head of the Sustainability & Corporate Transition Group at Citi, founder of the Climate Leaders Coalition.
- Suzan Craig, Board Member - Founder and CEO of Tahi Ecological Reserve in New Zealand, winner of New Zealand's Restoring Nature Award in 2020 and 2021.
- Subra Suresh, Board Member - Chairman of the Scientific Advisory Council of Société Générale, Professor at Large at Brown University, member of the Board of Trustees of California Institute of Technology, and Vannevar Bush Professor Emeritus at Massachusetts Institute of Technology. He was previously President of Carnegie Mellon University, President of Nanyang Technological University Singapore, Dean of Engineering at MIT, and Director of US National Science Foundation (NSF).
- Lee Howell, Executive Director - He is the former managing director of the World Economic Forum, and a member of the board of trustees at EAT.

== Purpose ==
Villars Institute states that its intent is “to accelerate the transition to a net zero economy and restore the health of the planet for all of its inhabitants.” They primarily do community development and sponsor relevant organizations, events, and research for sustainable systems and climate change.

== Events ==
The organization hosts and co-hosts different events. The two main annual events are The Villars Symposium and the Villars Summit. Various NGOs, Non-profit organizations, and charitable foundations attend. Academic scholars and prominent figures in the fields of emerging technology, sustainable development, education, and data analysis, as well as sponsored young students are invited to attend.

In March, 2022, the group held the first Villars Institute Summit in conjunction with the World Economic Forum. Professor Tim Flannery spoke at this event.

In June 2022, the organization held the first Villars Symposium. They hosted 228 participants, inviting prominent figures in the sustainability community and young adults, among them recipients of the Earth Prize, as part of their mission to develop intergenerationality to learn from established members of the current global sustainability and climate change community. Johan Rockstrom was the first distinguished lecture.

In September 2023, the nonprofit held the Nature Restoration Roundtable. Members of the "Remaking the Global Trading System for a Sustainable Future Project", a project founded by several Yale faculty members in collaboration with other universities, released a whitepaper analyzing global sustainable systems called the Villars Framework for a Sustainable Global Trade System.

== Partners ==
The NGO collaborates with many organizations with similar missions. In 2022, the Earth Foundation coordinated with Villars Institute to invite winners of the Earth Prize to the Villars Symposium. The Geneva Science and Diplomacy Anticipation (GESDA), the Earth Foundation, the World Economic Forum, and other organizations partnered with Villars Institute in 2023.

- 2041 Foundation
- Anant School for Climate Action in India
- ArtTech Foundation
- Collège du Léman
- EAT
- FIFAD
- Mercuria
- Minerva Project
- MJF Spotlight
- Office du Tourisme de Villars
- Phillips Academy Andover
- The Earth Foundation
- The Frontiers Research Foundation
- The Knowledge Society
- University of Oxford
- Villars Alpine Resort
- Villars Palace Academy
- World Economic Forum

== Cultural pursuits ==
The Villars Institute funds artistic and cultural organizations that are in line with their mission. Among these are the Festival International du Film Alpin des Diablerets, ArtTech Foundation, Villars Music Academy, the Montreux Jazz Festival, and the film Undaunted South Pole 2023.

=== Montreux Jazz Festival ===
On February 11 to April 1, 2023, The Villars Institute sponsored the Montreux Jazz Festival’s Spotlight Concerts at the Villars Alpine Resort in the Vaud Alps. English singer Cherise, UK singer Debbie Ehirim, Belgian Singer Mentissa, indie pop artist Flowerovlove, French alt-pop artist Aime Simone, and Scottish soul-pop singer Joesef.

=== The Villars Music Academy ===
The institute supported the Villars Music Academy, an activity program founded by Villars Institute and founded by Aline Champion from the Berlin Philharmoniker. They select talented musicians annually for masterclasses, interdisciplinary courses, a conference, workshops, and a concert at the Villars Palace Hotel.

=== Undaunted - South Pole 2023 ===
In 2023, the Villars Institute supported the film Undaunted - South Pole 2023, which chronicled the expedition of British adventurer Robert Swan.

== Notable speakers ==
Polar explorer Robert Swan was a guest speaker at the 2022 Villars Symposium.

Professor Tim Flannery was the head speaker at the Villars Summit in 2023.

At the World Economic Forum’s 2023 meeting in Davos, climate activist Jade Hameister reviewed the initial findings of the Villars Institute's Global Issues Survey on behalf of Villars Institute.

Didier Queloz, Nobel Laureate, spoke at the Villars Summit in 2023.
