= CSRD =

CSRD may refer to:

- Columbia-Shuswap Regional District, a regional district of British Columbia, Canada
- Supreme Council for the Restoration of Democracy, a military junta which staged a coup d'état in Niger in 2010
- University of Illinois Center for Supercomputing Research and Development (CSRD), a Computer Science research center active from 1984 to 1993
- Corporate Sustainability Reporting Directive, a sustainability reporting regulation in the European Union
