= Subra Suresh =

Indian-born American academic (born 1956)

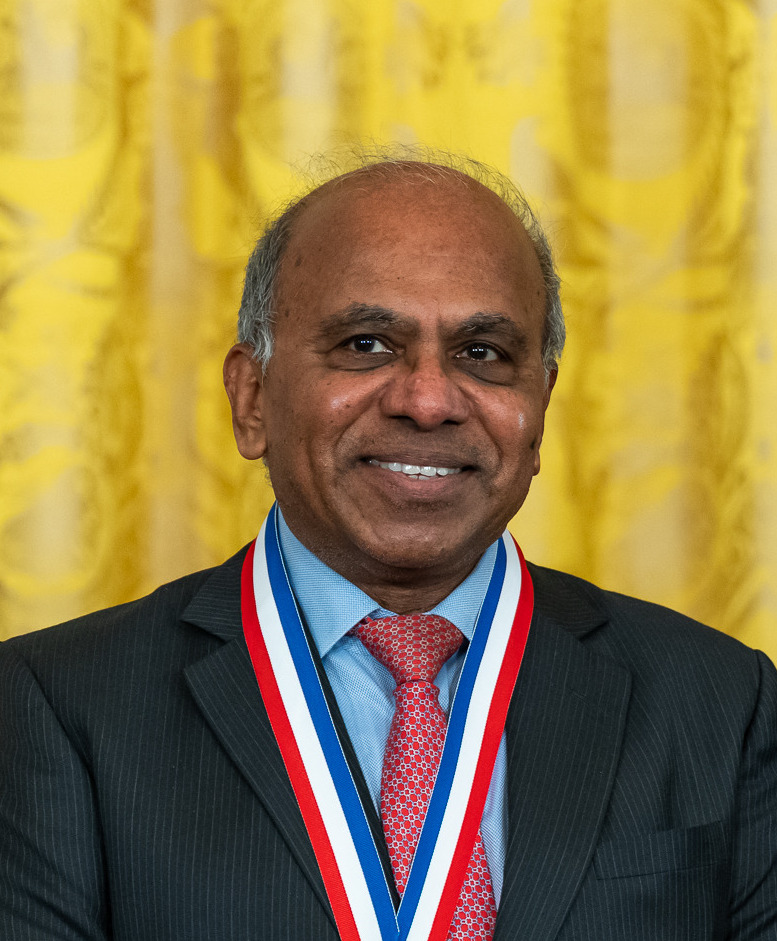
- Suresh in 2023

4th President of Nanyang Technological University
- In office 1 January 2018 – December 2022
- Preceded by: Bertil Andersson
- Succeeded by: Teck-Hua Ho

9th President of Carnegie Mellon University
- In office 1 July 2013 – 30 June 2017
- Preceded by: Jared Cohon
- Succeeded by: Farnam Jahanian

13th Director of the National Science Foundation
- In office October 18, 2010 – March 31, 2013
- President: Barack Obama
- Preceded by: Arden L. Bement Jr.
- Succeeded by: France A. Córdova

Personal details
- Born: Subramanian Suresh Bombay, India
- Education: Indian Institute of Technology Madras (BTech); Iowa State University (MS); Massachusetts Institute of Technology (ScD)
- Scientific career
- Fields: Materials science
- Workplaces: Brown University; Massachusetts Institute of Technology; National Science Foundation; Carnegie Mellon University; Nanyang Technological University
- Thesis: Mechanisms of environmentally - influenced fatigue crack growth in lower strength steels (1981)
- Doctoral advisor: Robert O. Ritchie
- Doctoral students: Upadrasta Ramamurty

Subra Suresh is an Indian-born American engineer, materials scientist, and academic leader. He is currently Professor at Large at Brown University and Vannevar Bush Professor of Engineering Emeritus at the Massachusetts Institute of Technology (MIT) and board member at the Villars Institute. He was Dean of the School of Engineering at MIT from 2007 to 2010 before being appointed as Director of the National Science Foundation (NSF) by Barack Obama, where he served from 2010 to 2013. He was the president of Carnegie Mellon University (CMU) from 2013 to 2017. Between 2018 and 2022, he was the fourth President of Singapore's Nanyang Technological University (NTU), where he was also the inaugural Distinguished University Professor.

Société Générale, one of Europe’s leading financial services groups, announced in February 2024 that Subra Suresh has been appointed Chairman of the Group’s Scientific Advisory Council.

Suresh was elected to the US National Academy of Engineering in 2002, to the National Academy of Sciences in 2012 and to the Institute of Medicine (now the National Academy of Medicine) in 2013. He is one of a very small number of Americans to be elected to three branches of the U.S. National Academies, and the first and only university president to hold this distinction. He was the first Asian-born professor to lead any of the five schools at MIT and the first Asian-born scientist to lead the NSF.

Suresh was awarded the National Medal of Science, the highest honor accorded to a US scientist, by President Biden in a ceremony at the White House on 24 October 2023.

== Early life and education ==
Suresh was born in Mumbai, India, and graduated from high school in Tamil Nadu at the age of 15. In May 1977, he received his BTech degree from the Indian Institute of Technology Madras in Chennai, graduating with a First Class with Distinction. Suresh received a Master's degree in Mechanical Engineering from Iowa State University in 1979, which awarded him an honorary doctor of science degree in 2022, and a ScD in Mechanical Engineering from Massachusetts Institute of Technology in 1981.

He was a postdoctoral researcher at the University of California, Berkeley, and the Lawrence Berkeley National Laboratory, during 1981-83.

== Career ==
=== Brown University ===
Suresh joined Brown University in December 1983 as assistant professor of engineering and was promoted to associate professor with tenure in July 1986 and to professor in July 1989. In 1985, he was selected by the White House to receive the NSF Presidential Young Investigator Award. He also received the 1982 Hardy Medal "for exceptional promise for a successful career in the broad field of metallurgy by a metallurgist under the age of 30", and the 1992 Ross Coffin Purdy Award from the American Ceramic Society for the best paper published in the Journal of the American Ceramic Society in 1990. In 1991, his book Fatigue of Materials was published by Cambridge University Press. According to Google Scholar it has been cited more than 7,800 times in scholarly publications, and has been translated into Chinese and Japanese and adopted as both a textbook and a reference work.

Suresh returned to Brown University in September 2023 as Professor at Large to deliver periodic public lectures and to continue his research collaborations.

=== Massachusetts Institute of Technology ===
Suresh moved to MIT in 1993 as the R.P. Simmons Professor of Materials Science and Engineering. He led MIT's Department of Materials Science and Engineering from 2000 to 2006. He served as Massachusetts Institute of Technology's Dean of Engineering from 2007 to 2010, the first Asian-born to be appointed dean of any of MIT's schools, and held MIT faculty appointments in Materials Science and Engineering, Mechanical Engineering, Biological Engineering, and Health Sciences and Technology.

In his leadership roles at MIT, he helped to create new state-of-the-art laboratories, a new undergraduate curriculum in materials science and engineering, the MIT Transportation Initiative, and the Center for Computational Engineering; led MIT's efforts in establishing the Singapore-MIT Alliance for Research and Technology (SMART) Center; and oversaw the recruitment of a record number of women faculty in engineering. As Dean of Engineering, he launched or oversaw a number of MIT's major international programs in Asia, the Middle East, Europe and the Americas.

=== National Science Foundation ===
In June 2010, Suresh was nominated by U.S. President Barack Obama to be the Director of the National Science Foundation (NSF) and was unanimously confirmed by the US Senate in September 2010. The NSF is an independent federal agency with an annual (US)$7-billion budget in 2013. Its 2013 Fact Sheet stated that "[NSF's] programs and initiatives keep the United States at the forefront of science and engineering, empower future generations of scientists and engineers, and foster economic growth and innovation. NSF funds discovery, learning, innovation, and research infrastructure to boost U.S. leadership in all aspects of science, technology, engineering, and mathematics research and education. In Fiscal Year 2012, NSF supported more than 300,000 individuals in 1,895 institutions in every state in the United States".

Suresh led NSF from 2010 to 2013. He established a number of new initiatives including Integrated NSF Support Promoting Interdisciplinary Research and Education (INSPIRE); Partnerships for Enhanced Engagement in Research (PEER), in collaboration with the United States Agency for International Development (USAID); Science Across Virtual Institutes (SAVI); the NSF Career-Life Balance Initiative; Graduate Research Opportunities Worldwide (GROW); and the NSF Innovation Corps (I-Corps).

During this time Suresh served as a member of the National Science and Technology Council (NSTC), a cabinet-level council comprising federal agency heads and cabinet secretaries. He co-chaired the NSTC Committee on Science and the Committee on Science, Technology, Engineering and Mathematics (STEM) Education, and served as a member of the cabinet-level National Ocean Council. Suresh also chaired the Interagency Arctic Research Policy Committee (IARPC), which helped set priorities for coordinating future arctic research across the federal government. Under Suresh's leadership, IARPC released a multiagency five-year strategic plan.

The Innovation Corps (I-Corps) program which Suresh designed and created in 2012 while serving as NSF Director is now regarded as one of the most impactful initiatives for translating scientific discoveries into commercial practice. It has been replicated by the National Institutes of Health and Dept of Energy, and by institutions abroad. According to the NSF biennial report released in June 2023, I-Corps has led to the creation of about 1,700 start-ups raising more than $4 billion in external funding in the US since 2012.

In response to an invitation from the White House Office of Science and Technology Policy, Suresh established and chaired a Global Summit on Scientific Merit Review at NSF in May 2012. This Summit included the participation, for the first time, of the heads of leading science funding agencies from nearly 50 countries. Summit participants endorsed a Statement of Principles of Scientific Merit Review to serve as a basis for potential multilateral collaborations in the future, and launched a virtual entity, the Global Research Council (GRC), to co-ordinate practices and enhance international scientific collaboration between developed and developing countries. The Global Research Council (GRC) which he founded and chaired in 2012 has now become a key annual forum for interactions among major research funding agency heads from about 50 countries.

In an editorial in Science magazine, Suresh stated, "Good science anywhere is good for science everywhere".

Commenting on Suresh's departure from NSF in 2013, President Obama stated, "We have been very fortunate to have Subra Suresh guiding the National Science Foundation for the last two years. He has shown himself to be a consummate scientist and engineer – beholden to evidence and committed to upholding the highest scientific standards. He has also done his part to make sure the American people benefit from advances in technology, and opened up more opportunities for women, minorities, and other underrepresented groups. I am grateful for his service."

=== Carnegie Mellon University ===
Suresh was appointed as the 9th president of Carnegie Mellon University in 2013 and served as president until 2017. During this time he also held faculty appointments in CMU's Departments of Materials Science and Engineering, Biomedical Engineering, Engineering and Public Policy, School of Computer Science, and in the Heinz College.

As President, Suresh worked to increase the numbers of women recruited to science, technology and mathematics disciplines. He was quoted as saying “If the United States is to remain a leader in discovery and innovation, we must engage the enormous talent pool represented by our young women.”

During Suresh's tenure, CMU settled a major patent infringement lawsuit against Marvell Technology Group. Suresh announced that the majority of the funds received by the university, expected to be about $250 million, would be dedicated to programs that "enhance the student experience". Suresh also negotiated several major donations from philanthropists and corporations, including $67M from CMU alum David Tepper to enhance collaboration among CMU's schools and colleges, $35M from Tata Consultancy Services and $5.5M from Uber.

In early 2017 Suresh pledged support to CMU's students following President Trump's immigration ban. In a letter circulated to students, Subra Suresh commented that he was "deeply troubled by some of the news out of Washington in recent days, and potential threats – explicit and implicit – posed to the work of so many students and scholars across the nation who were not born in the United States." Suresh recounted his own journey as an immigrant to the United States writing, "I first came to the US at age 21 with a partially filled suitcase, less than $100 in cash, and a one-way airplane ticket purchased with a loan. Once in the US, I was able to pursue a series of extraordinary opportunities for scholarship and service without regard for my national origin — an experience that forged in me an unshakeable faith in the ability of this nation to help everyone to succeed, wherever they came from."

Suresh has consistently advocated for diversity in higher education. In 2014 he commented to the Pittsburgh Gazette that "Diversity in the broadest sense — intellectual, cultural, ethnic, racial or national origin — intrinsically enhances artistic and technical innovation".

=== Nanyang Technological University Singapore ===
Suresh was inaugurated as President of NTU Singapore in January 2018. He quickly launched an initiative to turn the NTU campus into a "smart" campus, with eco-friendly buildings, greater use of robotics, and driverless electric buses. As president of Singapore's NTU, he oversaw the establishment of major new Corporate and Joint Laboratories with leading industry partners. During his tenure as president, NTU achieved successive years of record research funding, up to a four-fold increase in the number of NTU subjects independently assessed to be the best or within the top ten in the world, and the doubling of NTU research publications in the most impactful journals. He established the NTU Presidential Postdoctoral Fellows program, which has now become the most competitive talent recruitment effort. As part of its NTU 2025 Strategic Plan, he led efforts in creating a sustainability manifesto with NTU becoming the first academic entity in the world to issue sustainability-linked public bonds along with the commitment to achieve 100% Green Mark Platinum certification for all eligible buildings on its 500-acre (200-hectare) main campus, and carbon neutrality by 2035.

On 6 June 2022, Suresh announced he would step down as NTU President by end-December to return to the US.

== Honors ==
In 2007 he became a member of the German Academy of Sciences Leopoldina.

In 2013, Suresh was elected to the Institute of Medicine. He is also a member of the National Academy of Sciences and the National Academy of Engineering

In 2011, Suresh received the Padma Shri award, India's fourth-highest civilian honour, bestowed by the President of India. Other honors include the 2006 Acta Materialia Gold Medal; the 2007 European Materials Medal, the highest honour conferred by the Federation of European Materials Societies; the 2008 A. Cemal Eringen Medal from the Society of Engineering Science; the 2011 General President's Gold Medal from the Indian National Science Congress; the 2012 R.F. Mehl Award from the Minerals, Metals & Materials Society; the 2011 Nadai Medal from the American Society of Mechanical Engineers (ASME); and the 2011 National Materials Advancement Award from the Federation of Materials Societies. In 2011, Science Watch/Thomson Reuters selected Suresh as one of the top 100 materials scientists worldwide for the decade 2000–2010. He also received ASME's 2012 Timoshenko Medal, the highest recognition in the field of theoretical and applied mechanics, and the 2013 Alan Cottrell Gold Medal for his pioneering work on fracture and fatigue of materials. He received the Franklin Institute's 2013 Benjamin Franklin Medal in Mechanical Engineering and Materials Science for "outstanding contributions to our understanding of the mechanical behaviour of materials in applications ranging from large structures down to the atomic level." and for showing "how deformation of biological cells can be linked to human disease". In 2015, Suresh was awarded the IRI Medal by the Industrial Research Institute. Suresh received the ASME Medal in 2020.

Suresh is a member of the Royal Academy of Engineering of Spain; the Spanish Royal Academy of Sciences; the German Academy of Sciences; the Royal Swedish Academy of Engineering Sciences; the Academy of Sciences for the Developing World; the Indian National Academy of Engineering; the Indian Academy of Sciences; the Chinese Academy of Sciences; and the French Academy of Sciences. He is a recipient of 20 honorary doctorate degrees from universities in the United States, Sweden, Spain, Switzerland, India, China, and the United Kingdom.

Suresh has been honored with named initiatives in several academic institutions. In 2020, Iowa State University established the Subra Suresh Faculty Fellows program. In 2022, the California Institute of Technology as well as the Indian Institute of Technology Madras established the Subra Suresh Distinguished Lecture Series. In 2023, Brown University launched the Subra Suresh Colloquium Series at the Frontiers of Technology and Society.

He served as an independent director of Battelle Memorial Institute from 2014 to 2017, and of the Lord Corporation in 2010. He has served as a member of the Board of Directors of Hewlett-Packard and as an independent Director of the Board of Singapore Exchange (SGX).

In both 2018 and 2021, Suresh was named a laureate of the Asian Scientist 100 by the Asian Scientist.

Government offices
Preceded by Arden L. Bement Jr.	13th Director of the National Science Foundation; 2010–2013	Succeeded by France Cordova
Academic offices
Preceded by Jared Cohon	9th President of Carnegie Mellon University; 2013–2017	Succeeded by Farnam Jahanian
Preceded by Bertil Andersson	4th President of Nanyang Technological University; 2018–2022	Succeeded by Teck-Hua Ho
