= Su Guaning =

Singaporean academic

- 徐冠林

2nd President of Nanyang Technological University
- In office 1 January 2003 – 30 June 2011
- Preceded by: Cham Tao Soon
- Succeeded by: Bertil Andersson

Personal details
- Born: 1951 (age 74–75) Singapore
- Education: University of Alberta (BS); California Institute of Technology (MS); Stanford University (MS, PhD); University of Singapore; Harvard University
- Profession: College administrator; academic

Su Guaning (Chinese: 徐冠林; pinyin: Xú Guànlín) is a Singaporean college administrator and academic who served as the president of Nanyang Technological University (NTU) between 2003 and 2011. He is currently President Emeritus of Nanyang Technological University (NTU).

== Education ==
A President's Scholar from Raffles Institution in 1966 and Colombo Plan Scholar, Su graduated with a Bachelor of Science, Master of Science and Doctor of Philosophy in electrical engineering from the University of Alberta, California Institute of Technology, and Stanford University respectively. He also holds a Master of Science in statistics from Stanford University, and attended post-graduate programmes in business administration and management development at the University of Singapore (now the National University of Singapore) and Harvard Business School respectively.

== Career ==
Su began his career in 1972 as one of the first research engineers in Singapore's Ministry of Defence (MINDEF). He became Director of the Defence Science Organisation (DSO) in 1986, building it into Singapore's largest research and development institute. In 1997, he transformed DSO into a not-for-profit company, DSO National Laboratories, and became its first chief executive officer. After serving as the deputy secretary (technology) in MINDEF for two years, he set up the Defence Science and Technology Agency (DSTA) and became its founding chief executive in 2000 until 2002. He was appointed as the president of Nanyang Technological University (NTU) on 1 January 2003.

Su became an adjunct associate professor at the National University of Singapore (NUS)'s Department of Electrical Engineering in 1991 and taught radar systems and signal processing there. He was promoted to adjunct professor in 1995. He also taught management of technology at the NUS Business School from 1998–2000.

Su served on a number of boards, including the Board of Trustees of Institute Para Limes in the Netherlands, the boards of the Singapore National Research Foundation and Business China, Singapore, and the International Advisory Boards of King Abdulaziz University and Hong Kong Polytechnic University. He also serves on the board of the School of Science and Technology, Singapore. He is also an international reviewer for the Higher Education Evaluation and Accreditation Council of Taiwan, a member of Singapore's Climate Change Network, and a director of Nanyang International Education (Holdings) Limited. Su is an Honorary Fellow and past President of the Institution of Engineers, Singapore, and founding Fellow of the ASEAN Academy of Engineering and Technology.

NTU is a founding member of the Global Alliance of Technological Universities and Su is the founding Chairman. In 2010, he was re-elected Chairman of the Alliance for another two-year term. Prof. Su is a founding member and Board Member of the International IP Commercialization Council (IIPCC.org), a global NPO NGO.

== Awards ==
Su was awarded the Public Administration Medal (Silver) in 1989, the Public Service Medal in 1997, and the Public Administration Medal (Gold) and Long Service Medal in 1998 by the President of Singapore. In 2005, he was conferred the title of Chevalier of the Legion of Honour by the French government. In 2022, Su became a laureate of the Asian Scientist 100 by the Asian Scientist.

Academic offices
Preceded by Cham Tao Soon	President of Nanyang Technological University; 1 January 2003 - 30 June 2011	Succeeded by Bertil Andersson
