= David Gann =

David Gann CBE FREng
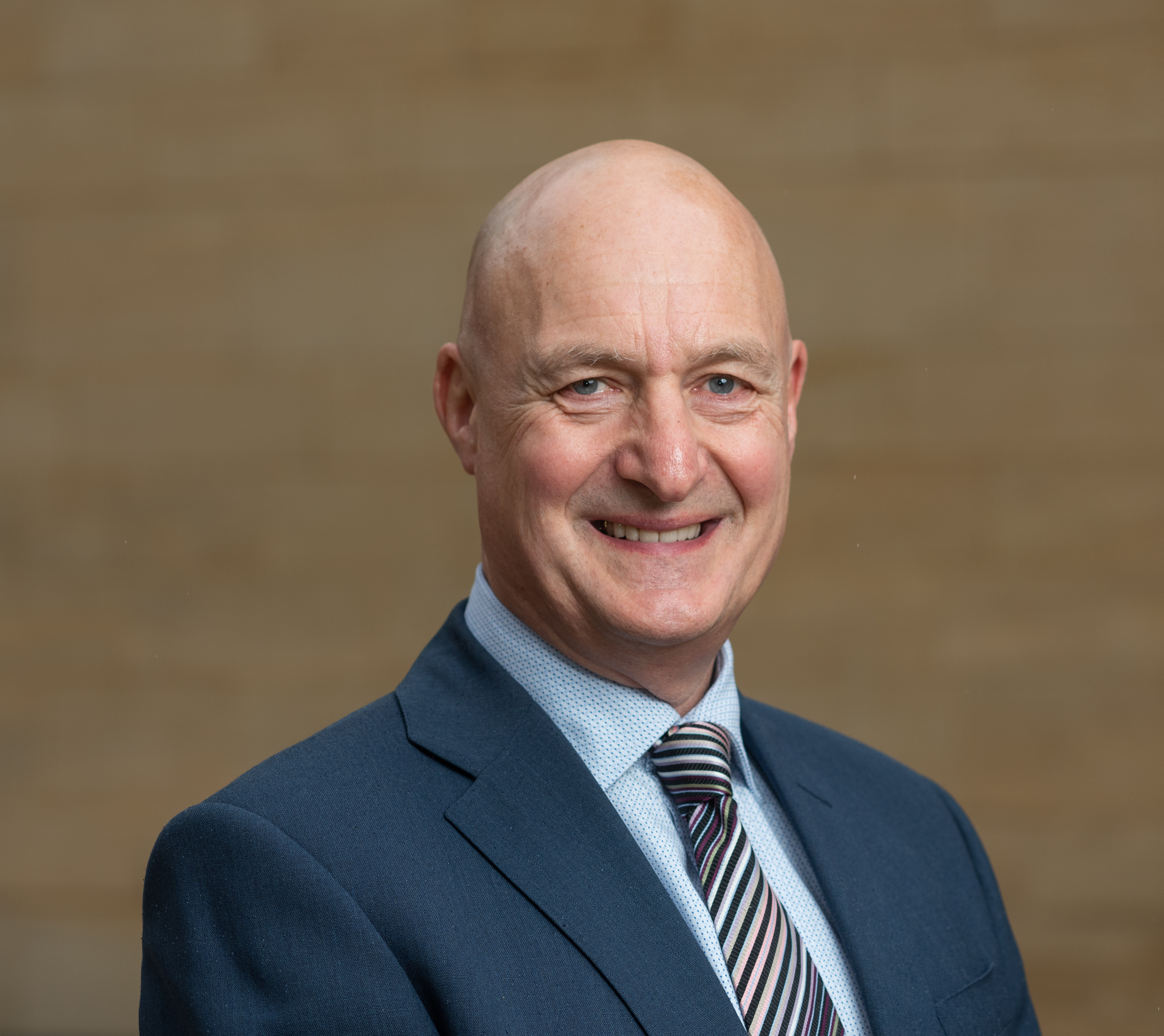

Academic work
- Discipline: Innovation, Technology Management, Entrepreneurship, Major infrastructure projects and systems, Fusion energy
- Institutions: University of Oxford, Imperial College London, University of Sussex

David Michael Gann CBE FREng (born 1960) is a British business leader, systems engineer, government advisor, and academic. He frequently advises governments, large companies, and start-ups, on innovation, entrepreneurship, and growth, and has published widely in these fields.

In 2010, Gann was appointed Commander of the Order of the British Empire (CBE) in the Queen's Birthday Honours for services to engineering. In September 2025 he was elected as a Fellow of the Royal Academy of Engineering.

Gann has a PhD in industrial economics, is a Chartered Civil Engineer, Fellow of the Institution of Civil Engineers and is an Honorary Fellow of the Royal College of Art.

His career has encompassed the study of innovation as an academic and its application in practice as an advisor to governments and as a board member and chairman of businesses and government organisations.

== Early life and education ==
Gann attended St Bartholomew’s school in Newbury, Berkshire.

He holds a PhD from the University of Sussex, an MSc in science, technology and industrialisation from the University of Sussex, a BSc in building construction and management from the University of Reading, and a certificate in corporate governance from the International Director’s Programme at INSEAD.

== Professional biography ==
Gann’s academic career started at University of Sussex, where he worked on science policy and industrial innovation. In 2002 he moved to Imperial College London where he was Professor of Innovation and Technology Management for 18 years. From 2003 to 2013, Gann directed the Innovation Studies Centre (ISC) – a ten-year EPSRC-funded programme conducting multi-disciplinary research on the innovation process in the science and engineering industries, from knowledge creation to commercialisation. The ISC final report showcases the major impact the programme has had on policy and practice.

Gann then moved into university leadership roles, including as vice-president (Innovation) at Imperial College London, where he was a strategic leader in the development of the White City Innovation District - a major, thriving innovation hub for new ventures, businesses and researchers, and then as pro-vice-chancellor development and external affairs and professor of innovation and entrepreneurship at the University of Oxford.

Gann has influenced policy and advised governmental bodies, including through his roles as founder and chair of the Smart London Board - where he helped deliver London’s digital strategy - and as a member of the UK Government’s Innovation Expert Group and the Ministry of Defence’s Technology and Innovation Board. He was chair of the UK Atomic Energy Authority from 2018 – 2023 and currently chairs UK Industrial Fusion Solutions Ltd.

In these academic, industry and government roles, Gann contributed towards major infrastructure projects and systems, delivering innovation in projects such as Heathrow terminal 5, the London Olympics, Crossrail, and the UK’s £2.5 billion major technology and infrastructure programme to build a prototype fusion powerplant - STEP.

Gann’s work with industry includes as a development and growth advisor for entrepreneurial ventures – focusing on deep science and technology, digital and AI, and medtech sectors. He is a venture capitalist, currently a director of VenCap plc.

== Research ==
Gann's main research interest is innovation: exploring why and how innovation happens, the ways it continually transforms the world we live in, and how it can be managed. Much of his early work at the University of Sussex was directed at the challenge of improving innovation skills, especially in construction, showing the connections between investment in skills and training and the innovation performance that improved project outcomes. He later developed a particular focus is on innovation in major projects, the use of AI and digital tools to support innovation, and the growth of entrepreneurial technology ventures.

His research demonstrates the importance of innovation strategies in major projects, helping them overcome their poor record of delivery on time and budget. Along with colleagues, Mark Dodgson and Ammon Salter, he was one of the first to identify and advocate the use of ‘innovation technologies’, such as AI and digital simulation and modelling, in intensifying innovation; that is in getting better outcomes, more quickly. These technologies contributed to what they described as ‘play’ in an innovation process typified by ‘Think’, having ideas, ‘Play’, prototyping and testing them, and ‘Do’, turning them into products and services. The development of the idea of the importance of ‘play’, and the study of numerous successful entrepreneurs, led to the concept of the ‘playful entrepreneur’. Such entrepreneurs manage to succeed through displaying a number of virtuous behaviours, and having fun whilst doing so.

== Fellowships and visiting professorships ==
- Fellow of the Royal Academy of Engineering, 2025–present.
- Emeritus professor - Innovation & Technology Management, Imperial College, 2020 –present.
- Fellow, Magdalen College, University of Oxford, 2020 - 2024.
- Fellow, City and Guilds of London Institute, 2015 – present.
- Tjalling C Koopmans Asset Award for extraordinary contribution to economic sciences, 2014.
- Honorary Fellow, Royal College of Art, 2011–present.
- Honorary professor in Innovation Management, UQ Business School, 2001–present.
- Fellow of the Institution of Civil Engineers, Institution of Civil Engineers, 2004–present.
- Visiting professor, University of Southampton, 2001 – 2006.
- Royal Academy of Engineering Chair in Innovative Manufacturing, Science and Technology Policy Research (SPRU), University of Sussex, 1996 – 2001.

== Selected publications ==
=== Articles ===
- LDW Thomas, E Autio, David M Gann, 2022, Processes of Ecosystem Emergence, Technovation.
- L Dahlander, David M Gann, MW Wallin, 2021, How open is Innovation? A retrospective and ideas forward, Research Policy.
- S Maier, JW Polak, David M Gann, 2020, Valuing Portfolios of Interdependent Real Options. Computers & Operations Research.
- A Davies, M Dodgson, David M Gann, SC MacAulay, 2017, Five Rules for Managing Large, Complex Projects, MIT Sloan Management Review.
- Rashik Parmar, Ian Mackenzie, David Cohn, David Gann, 2014, The New Patterns of Innovation, Harvard Business Review.
- Mark Dodgson, David Gann, Nelson Phillips, 2013, Organizational Learning and the Technology of Foolishness: The Case of Virtual Worlds at IBM, Organization Science.
- David Gann, Ammon Salter, Mark Dodgson and Nelson Phillips, Inside the World of the Project Baron, 2012, MIT Sloan Management Review.
- David Gann, Mark Dodgson and Dheeraj Bhardwaj, 2011, Physical-digital integration in city infrastructure, IBM Journal of Research and Development.
- Linus Dahlander and David Gann, 2010, How open is innovation?, Research Policy.

=== Reports ===
- Smart London Plan: Using the creative power of new technologies to serve London and improve Londoners' lives, Smart London Board, 2013
- M Dodgson, D Gann, I Wladawsky-Berger, N Sultan, Managing digital money, Academy of management journal, 2015

=== Books ===
- MY Zhang, M Dodgson, David M Gann, 2022, D emystifying China’s Innovation Machine, Oxford University Press
- Mark Dodgson and David M Gann, 2020, Philanthropy and Innovation, Springer International Publishing.
- Mark Dodgson and David M Gann, 2018, The Playful Entrepreneur – how to adapt and thrive in uncertain times, Yale University Press.
- Mark Dodgson, David Gann and Nelson Phillips, 2014, The Oxford Handbook of Innovation Management, Oxford University Press.
- Mark Dodgson and David Gann, 2010, Innovation: A Very Short Introduction, Oxford University Press
- Mark Dodgson, David Gann and Ammon Salter, 2008, The Management of Technological Innovation: Strategy and Practice, Oxford University Press.
- Mark Dodgson, David Gann and Ammon Salter, 2005, Think Play Do: technology, innovation and organisation, Oxford University Press.
- David M Gann, 2000, Building Innovation - complex constructs in a changing world, Thomas Telford Press

== Charitable work ==
Gann’s charitable and pro bono work focuses on the arts, music and environment. He is a director of the London Symphony Orchestra and chair of LSO Live, and was influential in the refurbishment of Brighton Corn Exchange when he was a trustee and director of Brighton Dome and Festival. He is a patron of Glyndebourne Opera.

Gann is vice-chair and co-founder at Villars Institute - a Swiss foundation focusing on systems leadership to halt climate change and bio-diversity loss.
