= Upadrasta Ramamurty =

Indian mechanical engineer

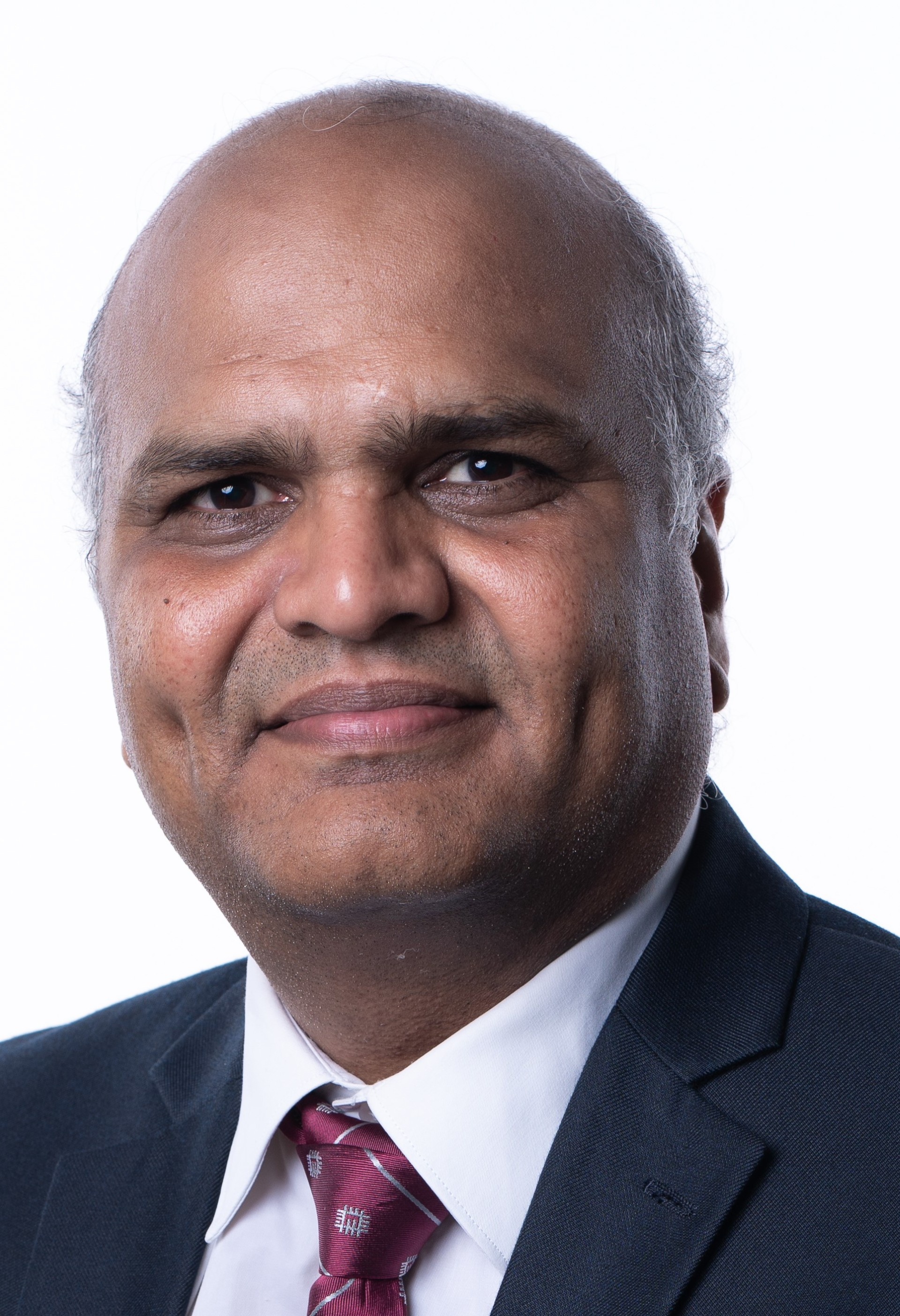
- Born: 1967 (age 58–59); Andhra Pradesh, India
- Other name: Ram (nickname)
- Education: Brown University, 1994, Ph.D; Indian Institute of Science, 1991, Master of Engineering; Andhra University, 1989, Bachelor of Engineering
- Scientific career
- Fields: Materials science, Mechanical Engineering
- Institutions: Nanyang Technological University; Massachusetts Institute of Technology; University of California, Santa Barbara
- Doctoral advisor: Subra Suresh

Upadrasta Ramamurty (born 1967) is the President's Chair Professor of Mechanical and Aerospace Engineering & Materials Science and Engineering at the Nanyang Technological University (NTU), Singapore. Prior to joining NTU, he was a professor in the Department of Materials Engineering at the Indian Institute of Science (IISc), Bangalore, India, from 2000 to 2018.

== Research Contributions ==
Ramamurty works in the field of materials engineering and has contributed to studies regarding deformation, fracture, and fatigue in advanced materials. Common themes in his work include the research of microstructural development, effects of thermo-mechanical processing, mechanisms of mechanical deformation, fracture mechanics and physical metallurgy.

He is a Fellow of INSA.

== Awards and honors ==
=== Awards ===
Ramamurty has received the following awards and honors:

- Lee Hsun Lecture Award, Institute of Metal Research, Chinese Academy of Sciences, 2017
- TWAS Prize (Engineering Sciences), The World Academy of Sciences, 2015
- CNR Rao Prize Lecture in Advanced Materials, Materials Research Society of India, 2014
- Shanti Swarup Bhatnagar Prize (Engineering Sciences), 2011
- Metallurgist of the Year, Metal Sciences category, Indian Institute of Metals and Ministry of Steels, Government of India, 2008

=== Honors ===
- Speaker in the Distinguished Seminar Series of Center for Materials Processing and Tribology, Purdue University.
- Co-chair, Fourth as well as Fifth Indo-American Frontiers of Engineering (IAFOE) Symposia, held respectively in Washington DC, USA (March 2012) and in Mysore, India (May 2014).
- Listed in Essential Science Indicators (ESI), which tracks top 1% of scientists, in the Materials Science category since July 2007.

== Fellowships ==
Ramamurty has been elected to a fellowship in the following academies:

- Fellow of The World Academy of Sciences (TWAS) (Elected 2016).
- Fellow of the Indian National Science Academy (Elected 2012).
- Fellow of the Indian Academy of Sciences (Elected 2010).
- Fellow of the Indian National Academy of Engineering (Elected 2010).

== Membership of Committees ==
Ramamurty has been involved in the following scientific committees:

- Member, Research Council, CSIR – National Institute for Interdisciplinary Science and Technology (NIIST), Trivandrum, India (2017 – 2020).
- Member, Sectional Committee for Engineering, Indian Academy of Sciences (IASc) (2016 – 2018).
- Member, Sectional Committee - VI (Materials Science & Engineering), Indian National Science Academy (INSA) (2016 – 2018).
- Member, Sectional Committee - VIII (Mining, Metallurgical and Materials Engineering), Indian National Academy of Engineering (INAE) (2014 – 2018).
- Member, Academic Advisory Council, Jawaharlal Nehru Centre for Advanced Scientific Research (2012 onwards).
- International Review Panel, Swiss Programme for Research on Global Issues for Development (r4d), Switzerland (2013 – 2018).
- International Review Panel, Deutsche Forschungsgemeinschaft (DFG), Germany's Priority Programmes:
  - SPP 1594: Topological Engineering of Ultrastrong Glasses (2012 – 2016).
  - SPP 2006: Compositionally Complex Alloys – High Entropy Alloys (2017 – 2021).
