= School of Science and Technology, Singapore =

Independent school in Singapore

- 新科技中学 (Chinese); Sekolah Sains dan Teknologi Singapura (Malay) அறிவியல் மற்றும் தொழில்நுட்ப பள்ளி, சிங்கப்பூர் (Tamil)
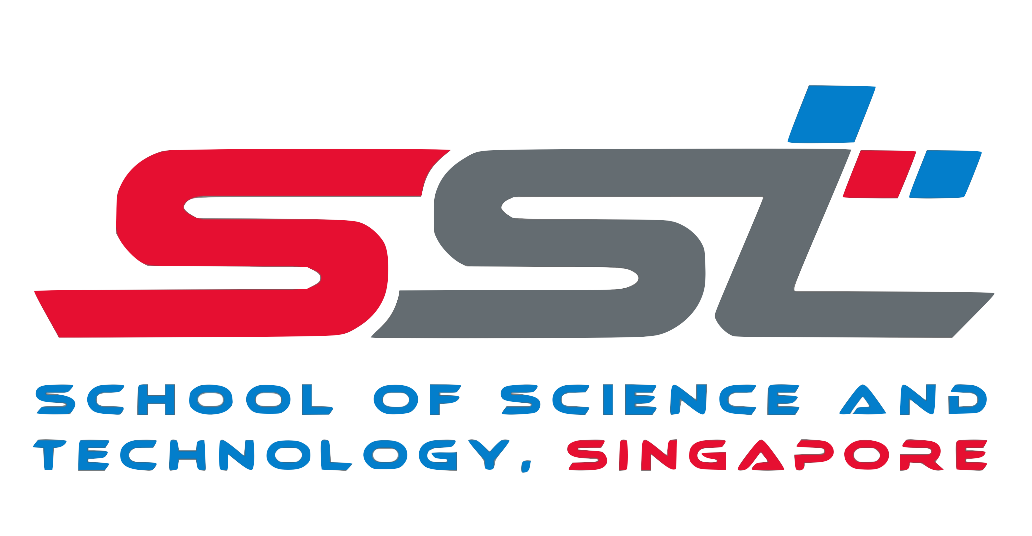

Location
- 1 Technology Drive; 138572; Singapore
- 1.313653°N 103.774264°E

Information
- Type: Specialised independent
- Motto: Shaping Future Innovators; The SST Way
- Established: 4 January 2010; 16 years ago
- School code: 7805
- Principal: Nick Chan
- Gender: Mixed
- Age range: 13–16
- Enrolment: 250(Per cohort)
- Average class size: 25
- Education system: Singapore-Cambridge GCE Ordinary Level; Integrated Diploma Programme
- Campus size: 6.7 acres (2.7 ha)
- Houses: Black; Red; Green; Blue; Yellow
- Colours: Red, grey and blue
- Website: www.sst.edu.sg

School of Science and Technology, Singapore (SST) is a specialised independent school in Singapore, offering a four-year curriculum leading to a Singapore-Cambridge GCE Ordinary Level (O-Levels) or first year entry to a STEM-related diploma course at Ngee Ann Polytechnic (NP).

== History ==
On 4 March 2008, the establishment of SST was announced in the 11th Parliament of Singapore, by Minister for Education Tharman Shanmugaratnam.

As part of setting up the school, SST partnered with Nanyang Technological University, IBM, and Creative Technology to provide learning opportunities and internship programmes for students. Five new applied subjects were also designed in collaboration with NP to be taken at O-Levels, namely Computing+, Engineering+, Biotechnology, Design Studies and Electronics. Students could take a maximum of one applied subject, with the exception of Engineering+ which is a combination of Computing and Electronics, on top of the regular O-Level subjects.

Shortly after the announcement of its establishment, recruitment for teachers began on 17 March 2008. In June 2008, Chua Chor Huat, former principal of Ngee Ann Secondary School, was appointed as the first principal, and Su Guaning was appointed as the first chairman.

On 13 May 2009, SST began its inaugural intake via the Direct School Admissions scheme, receiving applications from more than 1,100 students. An entrepreneurship advisory council, chaired by Inderjit Singh, was also set up to promote entrepreneurship and innovation in the school.

On 4 January 2010, the school welcomed the inaugural batch of 200 students at its interim campus at 5 Clementi Avenue 6.

On 29 March 2010, Senior Minister of State of National Development and Education Grace Fu officiated the groundbreaking ceremony for the permanent campus at 1 Technology Drive. Ngee Ann Kongsi also donated S$8.1 million to SST for annual scholarships and bursaries.

On 13 April 2013, SST was officially declared open by Deputy Prime Minister and Minister for Finance Tharman Shanmugaratnam.

== Curriculum ==
SST offers a four-year science and technology curriculum, leading to O-Levels or first year entry to a STEM-related diploma course at NP. Apart from the regular O-Level subjects, students usually take one applied subject. The first batch of O-Level students graduated in 2013.

On 17 November 2020, Minister for Education Lawrence Wong announced the launch of the Integrated Diploma Programme (IDP) scheme, allowing students to bypass O-Levels and gain first year entry to any of the 21 STEM-related diploma courses offered at NP. Under this scheme, students will still need to take the mother tongue language subject for O-Levels, as required by the Ministry of Education. In April 2025, NP accepted the first batch of IDP students.

== Campus ==
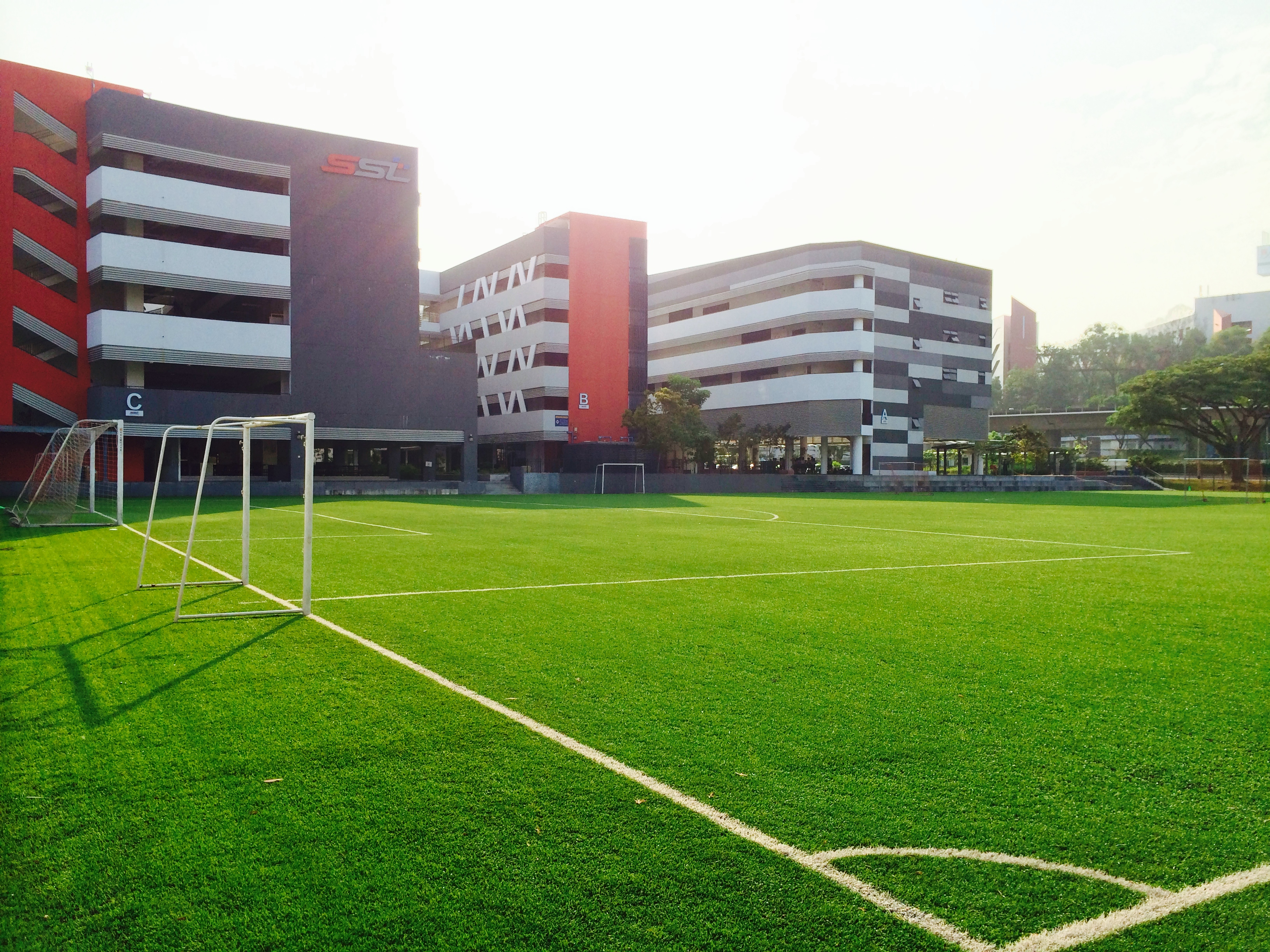
SST in 2014

The 6.7 acres (2.7 ha) campus is located at 1 Technology Drive in Clementi, opposite Singapore Polytechnic.

Costing S$49 million, construction of the permanent campus was completed in 2011, and SST moved in on 3 January 2012.

== Principals ==
Name of Principal	Years served	Notes
Chua Chor Huat	2008–2014	
Hoe Wee Meng	2014–2015	
Linda Chan Mui Mui	2015–2021	
Nick Chan	2021–present	
