= Linus Dahlander =

Innovation researcher

Linus Dahlander (born June 20, 1979, in Sweden) is an innovation researcher specializing in crowdsourcing, open innovation, and online communities. He is a professor at the European School of Management and Technology and holds the Lufthansa Group Chair in Innovation. He also served as associate editor of the Academy of Management Journal.

== Career ==
Linus Dahlander got a PhD at Chalmers University of Technology. Following his PhD he did a postdoc at Stanford University in the Scancor program. Afterwards he became a professor at the European School of Management and Technology, where he holds the Lufthansa Group Chair in Innovation.

Dahlander is a leading researcher on the topics of Crowdsourcing, Open Innovation, and Online Communities. His paper with David Gann on "How open is open innovation" has become one of the highest cited pieces in the field of open innovation. He has published in a wide range of top academic journals such as the Administrative Science Quarterly, Organization Science, Research Policy, and the Academy of Management Journal.

Dahlander served as an associate editor of the Academy of Management Journal from 2013 to 2016.

== Books ==
- Dahlander, L., Lars Frederiksen and Francesco Rullani. "Online communities and open innovation: Governance and symbolic value creation" Routledge; 1 edition (March 21, 2011).

== Awards and recognition ==
- 2017 Best 40 Under 40 Professors. Poets & Quants, March 2017.
- Recipient of Jürgen-Hauschildt-Award of the Technology, Innovation and Entrepreneurship section of the VHB - German Academic Association for Business Research for the best research publication in innovation management, 2016.
- Recipient of TUM Research Excellence Award of the Peter Pribilla Foundation for outstanding research in Innovation and Leadership, 2016.
