= Bertil Andersson =

Swedish academic

3rd President of Nanyang Technological University
- In office 25 July 2011 – 31 December 2017
- Preceded by: Su Guaning
- Succeeded by: Subra Suresh

Personal details
- Born: 1948 (age 77–78) Finspång, Östergötland, Sweden
- Education: Umeå University (BS, MS); Lund University (PhD, DSc)
- Profession: College administrator; academic

Bertil Andersson is a Swedish college administrator and academic who served as the third president of Nanyang Technological University (NTU).

Andersson received his Bachelor of Science and Master of Science at Umeå University and his PhD and DSc at Lund University. He started his research career at Lund University, after which he became a professor of biochemistry at Stockholm University, Sweden, in 1986. From 1996 to 1999, he served as the Dean of the Faculty of Chemical Sciences at Stockholm University. In 1999, Andersson became the Rector (President) of Linköping University, Sweden, where he served until the end of 2003.

From 2004 to 2007, he led the European Science Foundation in Strasbourg, France, as its chief executive.

From April 2007 to June 2011, Andersson served as Provost of NTU in Singapore. Having strengthened NTU's reputation as one of the fastest-growing research-intensive universities in the world, he was appointed President of NTU on 1 July 2011.

== Research and teaching ==
Andersson is a plant biochemist and the author of over 300 papers in photosynthesis research, biological membranes, protein and membrane purification and light stress in plants. He has pioneered research on the artificial leaf, a promising area of sustainable energy research that uses sunlight to produce clean, low-cost sources of energy. Sustainability is one of NTU's five strategic areas under its NTU 2015 plan, supported by more than S$830 million in research funding.

Andersson holds honorary doctorates from several universities, the most recent of which are Hebrew University of Jerusalem, the University of New South Wales and Symbiosis International University. He also holds honorary doctorate from SRM University, Chennai, India.

He continues to hold academic appointments as professor of biochemistry at Linköping University and adjunct professor at Umeå University.

== Awards and appointments ==
In 2017, Bertil Andersson was a laureate of the Asian Scientist 100 by the Asian Scientist.

In October 2013, Professor Andersson received the Medal for Educational Merit during the 30th Award Ceremony of the World Cultural Council. The medal was conferred by the WCC in recognition of his remarkable achievements, including his "contribution to the ascendancy of NTU, the fastest rising University in the global top 50, second amongst the world's young elite research intensive Universities under 50 years old."

In November 2010, Andersson received the Wilhelm Exner Medal in Vienna, Austria. The award was given in recognition of his research in biochemistry as well as his contributions to European and Austrian research. He is the first Singapore-based researcher to receive the award since it was introduced in 1921. Other winners of the award include 16 Nobel laureates.

A visiting professor and Fellow of Imperial College London, Andersson has been the key driver of the Lee Kong Chian School of Medicine, jointly established by NTU and Imperial College London.

Andersson has a long association with the Nobel Foundation and served as chairman of the Nobel Committee for Chemistry in 1997. As the chair of the Global Alliance of Technological Universities, of which NTU is a founding member, he leads a network of seven top global universities focused on harnessing science and technology to solve urgent societal challenges.

He has been a member of the boards of several Swedish and international foundations and learned societies, including the Royal Swedish Academy of Sciences, the Australian Academy of Science, Academia Europaea and the Royal Swedish Academy of Engineering Sciences.

Andersson is a research advisor to the Swedish government and was, between 2004 and 2009, the Vice-President of the European Research Advisory Board of the European Commission in Brussels. He is a board member of Singapore's Building and Construction Authority and A*STAR. He serves on the governing board of the Singapore Centre on Environmental Life Sciences Engineering, a Research Centre of Excellence at NTU. He was previously a member of the Singapore National Research Foundation's Scientific Advisory Board, set up by former Deputy Prime Minister Dr Tony Tan in 2006 to advise the Singapore government on its R&D strategy.

Andersson was elected to the Australian Academy of Science in 1999 as a Corresponding Fellow.

Andersson is the honorary Pro-Chancellor of SRM University, Andhra Pradesh.

Academic offices
Preceded by Su Guaning	President of Nanyang Technological University; 25 July 2011 – 31 December 2017	Succeeded by Subra Suresh
