= Review of the National Innovation System =

The Review of the National Innovation System was a process established in January 2008 by the Government of Australia and coordinated by an expert panel. Its purpose was to develop and deliver a green paper examining the Australian national innovation system.

== Aims ==
The review was announced on 22 January 2008 by the Minister for Innovation Kim Carr for the newly created Department of Innovation, Industry, Science and Research.The review is linked to simultaneous reviews of the Automotive and the Textiles, Clothing and Footwear industries. Its terms of reference included close consideration of the Cooperative Research Centres (CRC) program (paralleling the more specific O'Kane Review) and the Research and Development Tax Concession scheme, and it aimed to review "the coherence and effectiveness of existing Government support for innovation", to "identify gaps and weaknesses in the innovation system" and to "develop proposals to address them".

== Process ==
The process began in February 2008 with a panel meeting and the panel chair's speech to the Australian Industrial Research Group, continuing in March with a series of Stakeholder Consultation meetings for research & academia, government, and business & industry, held in each of the State capitals in association with a "Call for Submissions".

The Review considered over 730 submissions, conducted a series of focused workshops, and ultimately delivered its findings in the form of a green paper entitled "Venturous Australia" on 9 September 2008. The government invited comment on the paper until 30 September, and intends issue a response white paper later in the year.

=== Expert panel ===
The review was conducted by an expert panel chaired by Dr Terry Cutler, and included representatives from business and academia.

== See also ==
- Department of Innovation, Industry, Science and Research (Australia)
