= Julia Marton-Lefèvre =

French–American environmentalist and academic

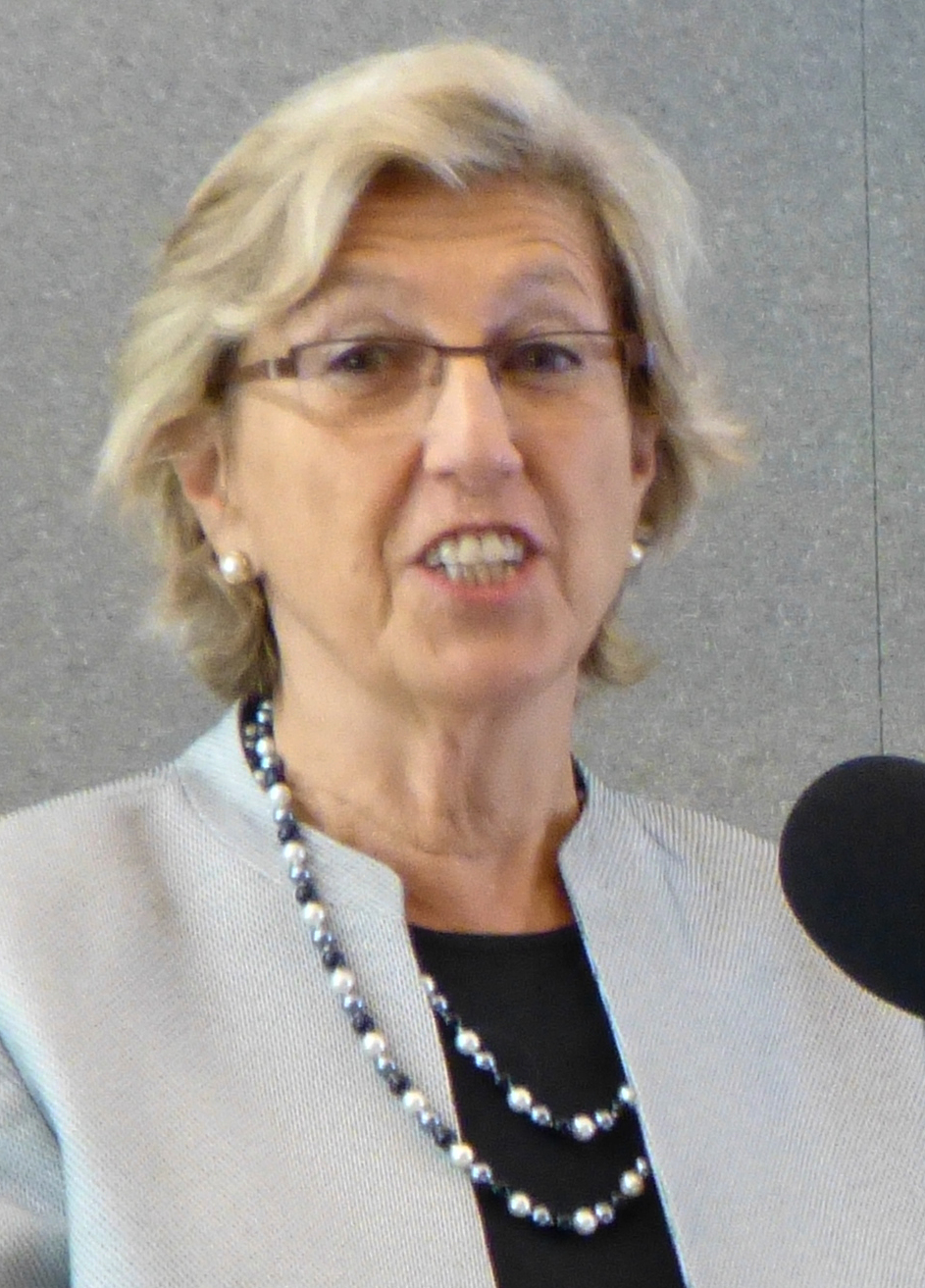
- Julia Marton-Lefèvre

Director General of the IUCN
- In office January 2007 – January 2015
- Preceded by: Achim Steiner
- Succeeded by: Inger Andersen

Rector of the University for Peace
- In office 2003–2007

Executive Director of LEAD International
- In office 1994–2003

Executive Director of the ICSU
- In office 1989–1992

Personal details
- Born: January 1, 1946 (age 80) Budapest, Hungary
- Education: University of Paris (History, Ecology, Environmental Planning)
- Occupation: Environmentalist; Academic; Adviser on sustainability
- Awards: AAAS Award for International Cooperation in Science; Chevalier de la Légion d’Honneur (France); Officier de l’Ordre National du Mérite (France); Chevalier de l'Ordre de Saint-Charles (Monaco); ProNatura Award (Hungary); Presidential Citation (Republic of Korea); Lifetime Achievement Award, NCSE (2019)

Julia Marton-Lefèvre (1946, Budapest) is a French - US environmentalist and academic. She studied history, ecology and environmental planning in the US and in France, and was born in Hungary.

== Career ==
Marton-Lefèvre was Director General of IUCN, the International Union for Conservation of Nature, from January 2007 to January 2015. Prior to this, Marton-Lefèvre was Rector of the University for Peace (UPEACE), a graduate-level international university, mandated by the United Nations, providing education, training and research on issues related to peace and conflict. Earlier offices held by Marton-Lefèvre include Executive Director of LEAD (Leadership for Environment and Development) International, a programme established by The Rockefeller Foundation to bring together and train mid-career leaders from all parts of the world in improving their leadership skills around the issues of sustainable development, and Executive Director of the International Council for Science (then known as ICSU). She began her international career in a programme on environmental education at UNESCO.

== Institutional affiliations ==
At present, Marton-Lefèvre is focusing on using her broad experience to advise organizations to help them achieve their goals. She chairs several international groups: the Villars Institute Foundation, the Executive Committee of the Tyler Prize for Environmental Achievement, the Donor Council of the Critical Ecosystems Partnership Fund, the Board of Trustees of the CGIAR Centers: the Alliance of Bioversity International and CIAT (the International Center for Tropical Agriculture) and the Strategy Advisory Council to the Institute for Sustainable Development and International Relations (IDDRI). From 2019 to 2023, she served as an elected member of the Bureau of the Intergovernmental Science-Policy Platform on Biodiversity and Ecosystem Services (IPBES) .

Her links with academic institutions are with Yale University, where she spent 2016 as the Edward P. Bass Distinguished Visiting Environmental Scholar. She continues her links with Yale at the School of the Environment by teaching and mentoring students as a board member of the Yale Environmental Leadership and Training Initiative. She also serves on the Advisory Boards of Oxford University's James Martin School, and the Julie Ann Wrigley Global Institute of Sustainability (Arizona State University). After completing a 10-year term as a founding member of the board of the Geneva-based Graduate Institute of International and Development Studies, she remains a member of the advisory board of the institute's Center for Environmental Studies.

Marton-Lefèvre's other board memberships include the Wildlife Conservation Society (WCS), the Turkana Basin Institute, and the Oceanographic Institute- Prince Albert 1st of Monaco Foundation. In the corporate world, she was elected in 2024 to join the Board of Directors of Veolia Environment S.A.

Previous Board memberships include the, China Council for International Cooperation on Environment and Development (CCICED), an advisory body to the Chinese Government, the Bibliotheca Alexandria, the International Institute for Environment and Development (IEED), Earth Charter International, the World Resources Institute (WRI), the International Research Institute for Climate and Society (IRI), the Lemelson Foundation, ICSU's Committee on Science and Technology in Developing Countries (COSTED) and the InterAcademy Council's Panel on Promoting Worldwide Science and Technology Capacities for the 21st Century. She was also a member of the juries of the Saint Andrew's, Volvo and Alcan Prizes and member of the global jury of the Holcim Awards. She has also participated in corporate environmental advisory boards to the Dow Chemical Company, to the Coca-Cola Company, as the Chair of the Independent Advisory Board to the Sustainable Biomass Program, advising seven large energy companies, and as a member of the Critical Friends group of Veolia Environment S.A.

== Awards ==
Marton-Lefèvre is the recipient of the AAAS Award for International Cooperation in Science; and has been honoured as a Chevalier de la Légion d’Honneur and as an Officier de l'Ordre National de Mérite by the government of France, and as a Chevalier dans l'Ordre de Saint-Charles by Prince Albert of Monaco. She also received the ProNatura Award from the government of Hungary and the Presidential citation from the Republic of Korea. In 2019, Marton-Lefèvre was recognized with a Lifetime Achievement Award of the National Council for Science and the Environment.

Marton-Lefèvre is an elected Member of the World Academy of Art and Science, the World Future Council and the Royal Geographical Society.
